= 1976 United States presidential election in New York =

- November 2, 1976

| Nominee | Jimmy Carter | Gerald Ford |
| Party | Democratic | Republican |
| Alliance | Liberal | Conservative |
| Home state | Georgia | Michigan |
| Running mate | Walter Mondale | Bob Dole |
| Electoral vote | 41 | 0 |
| Popular vote | 3,389,558 | 3,100,791 |
| Percentage | 51.95% | 47.52% |
County results
Carter
50–60%
60–70%
70–80%
Ford
50–60%
60–70%
President before election
Gerald Ford
Republican
Elected President
Jimmy Carter
Democratic

The 1976 United States presidential election in New York took place on November 2, 1976. All 50 states and the District of Columbia, were part of the 1976 United States presidential election. Voters chose 41 electors to the Electoral College, which voted for President and Vice President. New York was won by Democratic Georgia Governor Jimmy Carter, in a narrow victory against incumbent Republican President Gerald Ford, who failed to gain the presidency through formal election that year. Carter was running with Minnesota Senator Walter Mondale, and President Ford had selected Kansas Senator Bob Dole. The presidential election of 1976 was a very partisan election in New York, with more than 99% of the electorate voting for either Carter or Ford.

Carter took 51.95% of the popular vote to Ford's 47.52%, a victory margin of 4.43%. New York weighed in as being slightly more Democratic than the national average, by about 2%. The vast majority of counties in New York state were won by the Republican Ford, but the highly populated regions of New York City, Buffalo and Albany were able to tip the scales for the Democratic Carter.

Despite Ford being a Northern moderate, the Southerner Carter won commanding victories over Ford in four of the five boroughs of New York City. Carter broke 70% of the vote in Manhattan and the Bronx, and received over 60% of the vote in Brooklyn and Queens. Overall Carter took a citywide vote total of 66.37%, up to that point the third highest vote share ever received by a Democratic presidential candidate in New York City, surpassed only by the nationwide landslide victories of Lyndon B. Johnson in 1964 and Franklin D. Roosevelt in 1936, despite the fact that Carter was only winning a narrow 2-point victory nationwide. The massive raw vote margin in New York City was the vital key to Carter's narrow margin of victory in New York state. One reason for Ford's unusually weak performance in the city was likely his decision to drop Nelson Rockefeller the former Governor of New York from the ticket. Another likely reason was his initial refusal to grant the nearly bankrupt city a federal bailout during the city's 1975 fiscal crisis, sparking the infamous New York Daily News headline "Ford to City: Drop Dead." While Ford ultimately would extend federal loans to the city to prevent it from falling into bankruptcy, the damage to Ford's reputation in New York City likely contributed to his poor performance among voters there, and to his narrow loss in both New York state and in the nation overall, as Ford would have won the 1976 election and retained the presidency had he carried New York state.

== Results ==
President Ford’s initial refusal to grant a federal bailout to a nearly bankrupt New York City during the city's 1975 fiscal crisis sparked infamous headlines damaging Ford's reputation in the city, likely contributing to his poor performance in New York City in the 1976 election.

1976 United States presidential election in New York
| Party | Candidate | Votes | Percentage | Electoral votes |
|---|---|---|---|---|
| Democratic | Jimmy Carter | 3,244,165 | 49.65% | |
| Liberal | Jimmy Carter | 145,393 | 2.23% | |
| Total | Jimmy Carter | 3,389,558 | 51.87% | 41 |
| Republican | Gerald Ford | 2,825,913 | 43.24% | |
| Conservative | Gerald Ford | 274,878 | 4.21% | |
| Total | Gerald Ford (incumbent) | 3,100,791 | 47.45% | 0 |
| Free Libertarian | Roger MacBride | 12,197 | 0.19% | 0 |
| Communist | Gus Hall | 10,270 | 0.16% | 0 |
| Socialist Workers | Peter Camejo | 6,996 | 0.11% | 0 |
| U.S. Labor | Lyndon LaRouche | 5,413 | 0.08% | 0 |
| Write-ins | Various candidates | 4,342 (Note: Although McCarthy, Anderson and Maddox were separated from other write-in candidates, none of the write-in votes were separated by county; they were given only as a state-wide total.) | 0.07% | 0 |
| Write-ins | Eugene McCarthy | 4,303 | 0.07% | 0 |
| Write-ins | Thomas J. Anderson | 451 | 0.01% | 0 |
| Write-ins | Lester Maddox | 99 | 0.00% | 0 |
| Totals | | 6,534,170 | 100.0% | 41 |

=== New York City results ===
Results by borough for the 1976 US presidential election in New York City.

| 1976 presidential election in New York City | | Manhattan | The Bronx | Brooklyn | Queens | Staten Island | Total | |
| Democratic- Liberal | Jimmy Carter | 337,438 | 238,786 | 419,382 | 379,907 | 47,867 | 1,423,380 | 66.37% |
| Democratic- Liberal | Jimmy Carter | 73.22% | 70.77% | 68.34% | 60.54% | 45.45% | 1,423,380 | 66.37% |
| Republican- Conservative | Gerald Ford | 117,702 | 96,842 | 190,728 | 244,396 | 56,995 | 706,663 | 32.95% |
| Republican- Conservative | Gerald Ford | 25.54% | 28.70% | 31.08% | 38.95% | 54.11% | 706,663 | 32.95% |
| Communist | Gus Hall | 2,075 | 701 | 1,432 | 1,034 | 90 | 5,332 | 0.25% |
| Communist | Gus Hall | 0.45% | 0.21% | 0.23% | 0.16% | 0.09% | 5,332 | 0.25% |
| Socialist Workers | Peter Camejo | 1,468 | 453 | 870 | 767 | 102 | 3,660 | 0.17% |
| Socialist Workers | Peter Camejo | 0.32% | 0.13% | 0.14% | 0.12% | 0.10% | 3,660 | 0.17% |
| Free Libertarian | Roger MacBride | 683 | 276 | 551 | 577 | 115 | 2,202 | 0.10% |
| Free Libertarian | Roger MacBride | 0.15% | 0.08% | 0.09% | 0.09% | 0.11% | 2,202 | 0.10% |
| U.S. Labor | Lyndon LaRouche | 592 | 261 | 548 | 615 | 101 | 2,117 | 0.10% |
| U.S. Labor | Lyndon LaRouche | 0.13% | 0.08% | 0.09% | 0.10% | 0.10% | 2,117 | 0.10% |
| Write-ins | Write-ins | | | | | | | |
| Write-ins | Write-ins | 880 | 72 | 132 | 207 | 56 | 1,347 | 0.06% |
| TOTAL | | 460,838 | 337,391 | 613,643 | 627,503 | 105,326 | 2,144,701 | 100.00% |

=== Results by county ===
| County | Jimmy Carter Democratic/Liberal | | Gerald Ford Republican/Conservative | | Roger MacBride Free Libertarian | | Gus Hall Communist | | Peter Camejo Socialist Workers | | Lyndon LaRouche U.S. Labor | | Margin | | Total votes cast |
| County | # | % | # | % | # | % | # | % | # | % | # | % | # | % | Total votes cast |
|---|---|---|---|---|---|---|---|---|---|---|---|---|---|---|---|
| Albany | 71,616 | 50.29% | 69,592 | 48.87% | 519 | 0.36% | 148 | 0.10% | 195 | 0.14% | 138 | 0.10% | 2,024 | 1.42% | 142,409 |
| Allegany | 6,134 | 34.06% | 11,769 | 65.35% | 36 | 0.20% | 14 | 0.08% | 16 | 0.09% | 9 | 0.05% | −5,635 | −31.29% | 18,010 |
| Bronx | 238,786 | 70.77% | 96,842 | 28.70% | 276 | 0.08% | 701 | 0.21% | 453 | 0.13% | 261 | 0.08% | 141,944 | 42.07% | 337,391 |
| Broome | 39,827 | 43.93% | 50,340 | 55.53% | 174 | 0.19% | 79 | 0.09% | 85 | 0.09% | 44 | 0.05% | −10,513 | −11.60% | 90,658 |
| Cattaraugus | 13,768 | 41.19% | 19,469 | 58.25% | 71 | 0.21% | 23 | 0.07% | 21 | 0.06% | 41 | 0.12% | −5,701 | −17.06% | 33,422 |
| Cayuga | 13,348 | 40.03% | 19,775 | 59.31% | 44 | 0.13% | 30 | 0.09% | 16 | 0.05% | 42 | 0.13% | −6,427 | −19.28% | 33,343 |
| Chautauqua | 27,447 | 44.68% | 33,730 | 54.90% | 137 | 0.22% | 40 | 0.07% | 42 | 0.07% | 40 | 0.07% | −6,283 | −10.22% | 61,436 |
| Chemung | 17,207 | 45.25% | 20,640 | 54.28% | 55 | 0.14% | 28 | 0.07% | 22 | 0.06% | 45 | 0.12% | −3,433 | −9.03% | 38,026 |
| Chenango | 7,356 | 37.08% | 12,384 | 62.43% | 47 | 0.24% | 16 | 0.08% | 8 | 0.04% | 19 | 0.10% | −5,028 | −25.35% | 19,837 |
| Clinton | 11,555 | 42.63% | 15,433 | 56.94% | 44 | 0.16% | 20 | 0.07% | 25 | 0.09% | 22 | 0.08% | −3,878 | −14.31% | 27,103 |
| Columbia | 10,514 | 39.56% | 15,871 | 59.72% | 82 | 0.31% | 38 | 0.14% | 27 | 0.10% | 42 | 0.16% | −5,357 | −20.16% | 26,574 |
| Cortland | 6,947 | 37.96% | 11,222 | 61.32% | 67 | 0.37% | 12 | 0.07% | 16 | 0.09% | 13 | 0.07% | −4,275 | −23.36% | 18,300 |
| Delaware | 7,254 | 36.59% | 12,443 | 62.76% | 40 | 0.20% | 17 | 0.09% | 11 | 0.06% | 14 | 0.07% | −5,189 | −26.17% | 19,827 |
| Dutchess | 37,531 | 41.65% | 51,312 | 56.94% | 264 | 0.30% | 76 | 0.09% | 88 | 0.10% | 62 | 0.07% | −13,781 | −15.29% | 90,111 |
| Erie | 229,397 | 50.66% | 220,310 | 48.65% | 1,346 | 0.30% | 540 | 0.12% | 252 | 0.06% | 508 | 0.11% | 9,087 | 2.01% | 452,843 |
| Essex | 6,556 | 38.97% | 10,194 | 60.59% | 34 | 0.20% | 23 | 0.14% | 8 | 0.05% | 9 | 0.05% | −3,638 | −21.62% | 16,824 |
| Franklin | 7,248 | 44.87% | 8,846 | 54.77% | 23 | 0.14% | 9 | 0.06% | 6 | 0.04% | 9 | 0.06% | −1,598 | −9.90% | 16,152 |
| Fulton | 9,323 | 43.10% | 12,161 | 56.23% | 71 | 0.33% | 15 | 0.07% | 5 | 0.02% | 17 | 0.08% | −2,838 | −13.13% | 21,629 |
| Genesee | 10,803 | 42.30% | 14,567 | 57.04% | 61 | 0.24% | 26 | 0.10% | 8 | 0.03% | 22 | 0.09% | −3,764 | −14.74% | 25,536 |
| Greene | 7,740 | 40.18% | 11,370 | 59.02% | 56 | 0.29% | 16 | 0.08% | 26 | 0.14% | 26 | 0.14% | −3,630 | −18.84% | 19,264 |
| Hamilton | 1,052 | 31.22% | 2,306 | 68.43% | 8 | 0.24% | 3 | 0.09% | 1 | 0.03% | 0 | 0.00% | −1,254 | −37.21% | 3,370 |
| Herkimer | 12,875 | 45.37% | 15,362 | 54.14% | 58 | 0.20% | 24 | 0.08% | 19 | 0.07% | 23 | 0.08% | −2,487 | −8.77% | 28,377 |
| Jefferson | 13,503 | 39.68% | 20,401 | 59.95% | 32 | 0.09% | 29 | 0.09% | 14 | 0.04% | 27 | 0.08% | −6,898 | −20.27% | 34,028 |
| Kings | 419,382 | 68.34% | 190,728 | 31.08% | 551 | 0.09% | 1,432 | 0.23% | 870 | 0.14% | 548 | 0.09% | 228,654 | 37.26% | 613,643 |
| Lewis | 3,764 | 39.07% | 5,840 | 60.62% | 15 | 0.16% | 6 | 0.06% | 4 | 0.04% | 4 | 0.04% | −2,076 | −21.55% | 9,633 |
| Livingston | 9,629 | 40.43% | 14,044 | 58.96% | 78 | 0.33% | 28 | 0.12% | 10 | 0.04% | 21 | 0.09% | −4,415 | −18.53% | 23,819 |
| Madison | 8,822 | 35.87% | 15,674 | 63.74% | 39 | 0.16% | 15 | 0.06% | 16 | 0.07% | 25 | 0.10% | −6,852 | −27.87% | 24,591 |
| Monroe | 134,739 | 44.40% | 167,303 | 55.14% | 781 | 0.26% | 243 | 0.08% | 177 | 0.06% | 191 | 0.06% | −32,564 | −10.74% | 303,434 |
| Montgomery | 11,271 | 45.57% | 13,281 | 53.70% | 59 | 0.24% | 27 | 0.11% | 17 | 0.07% | 30 | 0.12% | −2,010 | −8.13% | 24,734 |
| Nassau | 302,869 | 47.64% | 329,176 | 51.78% | 955 | 0.15% | 734 | 0.12% | 515 | 0.08% | 334 | 0.05% | −26,307 | −4.14% | 635,756 |
| New York | 337,438 | 73.22% | 117,702 | 25.54% | 683 | 0.15% | 2,075 | 0.45% | 1,468 | 0.32% | 592 | 0.13% | 219,736 | 47.68% | 460,838 |
| Niagara | 43,667 | 48.39% | 46,101 | 51.09% | 232 | 0.26% | 52 | 0.06% | 46 | 0.05% | 79 | 0.09% | −2,434 | −2.70% | 90,239 |
| Oneida | 47,779 | 45.08% | 57,655 | 54.40% | 251 | 0.24% | 85 | 0.08% | 47 | 0.04% | 89 | 0.08% | −9,876 | −9.32% | 105,988 |
| Onondaga | 76,097 | 39.51% | 115,474 | 59.96% | 312 | 0.16% | 214 | 0.11% | 103 | 0.05% | 126 | 0.07% | −39,377 | −20.45% | 192,578 |
| Ontario | 14,044 | 39.63% | 21,118 | 59.59% | 100 | 0.28% | 35 | 0.10% | 13 | 0.04% | 31 | 0.09% | −7,074 | −19.96% | 35,441 |
| Orange | 40,362 | 44.51% | 49,685 | 54.80% | 183 | 0.20% | 113 | 0.12% | 61 | 0.07% | 60 | 0.07% | −9,323 | −10.29% | 90,673 |
| Orleans | 5,927 | 39.45% | 8,994 | 59.87% | 48 | 0.32% | 11 | 0.07% | 10 | 0.07% | 7 | 0.05% | −3,067 | −20.42% | 15,023 |
| Oswego | 16,332 | 40.36% | 23,949 | 59.19% | 83 | 0.21% | 42 | 0.10% | 18 | 0.04% | 27 | 0.07% | −7,617 | −18.83% | 40,463 |
| Otsego | 9,787 | 39.54% | 14,796 | 59.77% | 51 | 0.21% | 25 | 0.10% | 10 | 0.04% | 29 | 0.12% | −5,009 | −20.23% | 24,754 |
| Putnam | 11,963 | 38.95% | 18,523 | 60.31% | 65 | 0.21% | 38 | 0.12% | 34 | 0.11% | 25 | 0.08% | −6,560 | −21.36% | 30,711 |
| Queens | 379,907 | 60.54% | 244,396 | 38.95% | 577 | 0.09% | 1,034 | 0.16% | 767 | 0.12% | 615 | 0.10% | 135,511 | 21.59% | 627,503 |
| Rensselaer | 28,979 | 41.60% | 40,229 | 57.76% | 213 | 0.31% | 64 | 0.09% | 42 | 0.06% | 59 | 0.08% | −11,250 | −16.16% | 69,653 |
| Richmond | 47,867 | 45.45% | 56,995 | 54.11% | 115 | 0.11% | 90 | 0.09% | 102 | 0.10% | 101 | 0.10% | −9,128 | −8.66% | 105,326 |
| Rockland | 48,673 | 47.93% | 52,087 | 51.30% | 208 | 0.21% | 166 | 0.16% | 110 | 0.11% | 46 | 0.05% | −3,414 | −3.37% | 101,540 |
| Saratoga | 23,768 | 38.04% | 38,296 | 61.29% | 220 | 0.35% | 76 | 0.12% | 26 | 0.04% | 51 | 0.08% | −14,528 | −23.25% | 62,486 |
| Schenectady | 31,838 | 42.60% | 40,789 | 54.58% | 242 | 0.33% | 117 | 0.16% | 69 | 0.09% | 88 | 0.12% | −8,951 | −11.98% | 74,732 |
| Schoharie | 5,250 | 41.95% | 7,154 | 57.16% | 39 | 0.31% | 20 | 0.16% | 16 | 0.13% | 18 | 0.14% | −1,904 | −15.21% | 12,515 |
| Schuyler | 2,885 | 40.13% | 4,267 | 59.35% | 17 | 0.24% | 6 | 0.08% | 6 | 0.08% | 5 | 0.07% | −1,382 | −19.22% | 7,189 |
| Seneca | 5,745 | 42.53% | 7,659 | 56.70% | 44 | 0.33% | 10 | 0.07% | 5 | 0.04% | 9 | 0.07% | −1,914 | −14.17% | 13,508 |
| St. Lawrence | 17,503 | 43.83% | 22,249 | 55.71% | 55 | 0.14% | 43 | 0.11% | 22 | 0.06% | 15 | 0.04% | −4,746 | −11.88% | 39,934 |
| Steuben | 14,685 | 38.63% | 23,164 | 60.93% | 80 | 0.21% | 40 | 0.11% | 28 | 0.07% | 18 | 0.05% | −8,479 | −22.30% | 38,015 |
| Suffolk | 208,263 | 45.27% | 248,908 | 54.10% | 1,035 | 0.23% | 486 | 0.11% | 391 | 0.09% | 328 | 0.07% | −40,645 | −8.83% | 460,048 |
| Sullivan | 14,189 | 50.50% | 13,709 | 48.79% | 70 | 0.25% | 46 | 0.16% | 30 | 0.11% | 34 | 0.12% | 480 | 1.71% | 28,096 |
| Tioga | 6,969 | 36.89% | 11,824 | 62.58% | 32 | 0.17% | 17 | 0.09% | 15 | 0.08% | 11 | 0.06% | −4,855 | −25.69% | 18,893 |
| Tompkins | 12,808 | 44.67% | 15,463 | 53.93% | 58 | 0.20% | 38 | 0.13% | 73 | 0.26% | 19 | 0.07% | −2,655 | −9.26% | 28,671 |
| Ulster | 30,190 | 45.64% | 35,353 | 53.44% | 207 | 0.31% | 130 | 0.20% | 89 | 0.13% | 57 | 0.09% | −5,163 | −7.80% | 66,153 |
| Warren | 7,264 | 33.15% | 14,548 | 66.39% | 41 | 0.19% | 17 | 0.08% | 12 | 0.05% | 13 | 0.06% | −7,284 | −33.24% | 21,912 |
| Washington | 7,262 | 34.06% | 13,946 | 65.40% | 56 | 0.26% | 25 | 0.12% | 13 | 0.06% | 12 | 0.06% | −6,684 | −31.34% | 21,324 |
| Wayne | 12,061 | 38.22% | 19,324 | 61.24% | 81 | 0.26% | 16 | 0.05% | 7 | 0.02% | 14 | 0.04% | −7,263 | −23.02% | 31,557 |
| Westchester | 173,153 | 45.06% | 208,527 | 54.26% | 706 | 0.18% | 705 | 0.18% | 383 | 0.10% | 229 | 0.06% | −35,374 | −9.20% | 384,296 |
| Wyoming | 5,737 | 36.92% | 9,726 | 62.59% | 45 | 0.29% | 15 | 0.10% | 4 | 0.03% | 12 | 0.08% | −3,989 | −25.67% | 15,539 |
| Yates | 2,903 | 33.21% | 5,796 | 66.30% | 25 | 0.29% | 7 | 0.08% | 4 | 0.05% | 7 | 0.08% | −2,893 | −33.09% | 8,742 |
| Totals | 3,389,558 | 51.87% | 3,100,791 | 47.45% | 12,197 | 0.19% | 10,270 | 0.16% | 6,996 | 0.11% | 5,413 | 0.08% | 288,767 | 4.42% | 6,534,420 |

==== Counties that flipped from Republican to Democratic ====
- Albany
- Erie
- Queens
- Sullivan

=== By congressional district ===
Despite losing the state, Ford won 23 of the state's 39 congressional districts, including 13 which elected Democrats, while the remaining 11 districts were won by Carter, including one which elected a Republican.

| District | Carter | Ford | Representative |
|---|---|---|---|
| 1st | 45.6% | 54.4% | Otis G. Pike |
| 2nd | 45.4% | 54.6% | Thomas Downey |
| 3rd | 45.8% | 54.2% | Jerome Ambro |
| 4th | 48.8% | 51.2% | Norman F. Lent |
| 5th | 48.3% | 51.7% | John W. Wydler |
| 6th | 49.5% | 50.5% | Lester Wolff |
| 7th | 71.6% | 28.4% | Joseph P. Addabbo |
| 8th | 66.7% | 33.3% | Ben Rosenthal |
| 9th | 45.7% | 54.3% | James J. Delaney |
| 10th | 57.2% | 42.8% | Mario Biaggi |
| 11th | 70% | 30% | James H. Scheuer |
| 12th | 82.5% | 17.5% | Shirley Chisholm |
| 13th | 71.7% | 28.3% | Stephen Solarz |
| 14th | 78.1% | 21.9% | Fred Richmond |
| 15th | 49.8% | 50.2% | Leo C. Zeferetti |
| 16th | 71.3% | 28.7% | Elizabeth Holtzman |
| 17th | 54.8% | 45.2% | John Murphy |
| 18th | 63.1% | 36.9% | Ed Koch |
| 19th | 87.1% | 12.9% | Charlie Rangel |
| 20th | 76.7% | 23.3% | Bella Abzug |
| 20th | 76.7% | 23.3% | Ted Weiss |
| 21st | 90.7% | 9.3% | Herman Badillo |
| 22nd | 76.5% | 23.5% | Jonathan B. Bingham |
| 23rd | 52.5% | 47.5% | Peter A. Peyser |
| 23rd | 52.5% | 47.5% | Bruce Caputo |
| 24th | 47% | 53% | Richard Ottinger |
| 25th | 42.1% | 57.9% | Hamilton Fish IV |
| 26th | 46.4% | 53.6% | Benjamin Gilman |
| 27th | 44.9% | 55.1% | Matt McHugh |
| 28th | 48.6% | 51.4% | Samuel Stratton |
| 29th | 39% | 61% | Edward W. Pattison |
| 30th | 41.8% | 58.2% | Robert C. McEwen |
| 31st | 44.1% | 55.9% | Don Mitchell |
| 32nd | 39.1% | 60.9% | James M. Hanley |
| 33rd | 39.5% | 60.5% | William F. Walsh |
| 34th | 43.4% | 56.6% | Frank Horton |
| 35th | 43.4% | 56.6% | Barber Conable |
| 36th | 46.3% | 53.7% | John LaFalce |
| 37th | 63.4% | 36.6% | Henry J. Nowak |
| 38th | 44.6% | 55.4% | Jack Kemp |
| 39th | 42.1% | 57.9% | Stan Lundine |

== Analysis ==
Even though Ford won in 55 of New York state's 62 counties, Carter's landslide in heavily populated New York City provided Carter with a citywide vote advantage over Ford of 716,717 votes, which was more than twice Carter's statewide victory margin of 288,767 votes. Without Carter winning the New York City boroughs of Manhattan, Queens, Brooklyn and the Bronx, Ford would have won the state by 437,078 votes, (with 9.7% margin) and the presidency with an Electoral College victory of 281 to 256. There was a significant difference between the results of Upstate New York and Downstate New York in this election. Ford won Upstate by 11% and Carter won Downstate by 16%,.

Ford won 50 of the 53 counties in Upstate New York. Carter only won the following three upstate counties: Albany (Albany), Erie (Buffalo), and Sullivan (Monticello). Although Carter won only four of the nine counties in densely populated Downstate New York, he won all four of them by between 21 and 47 percentage points, whereas the five counties in Downstate New York that Ford won all went to him by much smaller margins of between 3 and 9 percentage points.

The 1976 Democratic National Convention was held at Madison Square Garden in New York City, in July 1976. At the convention, electors and delegates met for 3 days in New York City before formally nominating Carter to run for the presidency.

== See also ==
- United States presidential elections in New York
- Presidency of Jimmy Carter
- Watergate scandal
