= 1984 United States presidential election in New York =

- November 6, 1984

Nominee	Ronald Reagan	Walter Mondale
Party	Republican	Democratic
Alliance	Conservative	Liberal
Home state	California	Minnesota
Running mate	George H. W. Bush	Geraldine Ferraro
Electoral vote	36	0
Popular vote	3,664,763	3,119,609
Percentage	53.84%	45.83%
County results
Reagan
50–60%
60–70%
70–80%
Mondale
50–60%
60–70%
70–80%
President before election
Ronald Reagan
Republican
Elected President
Ronald Reagan
Republican

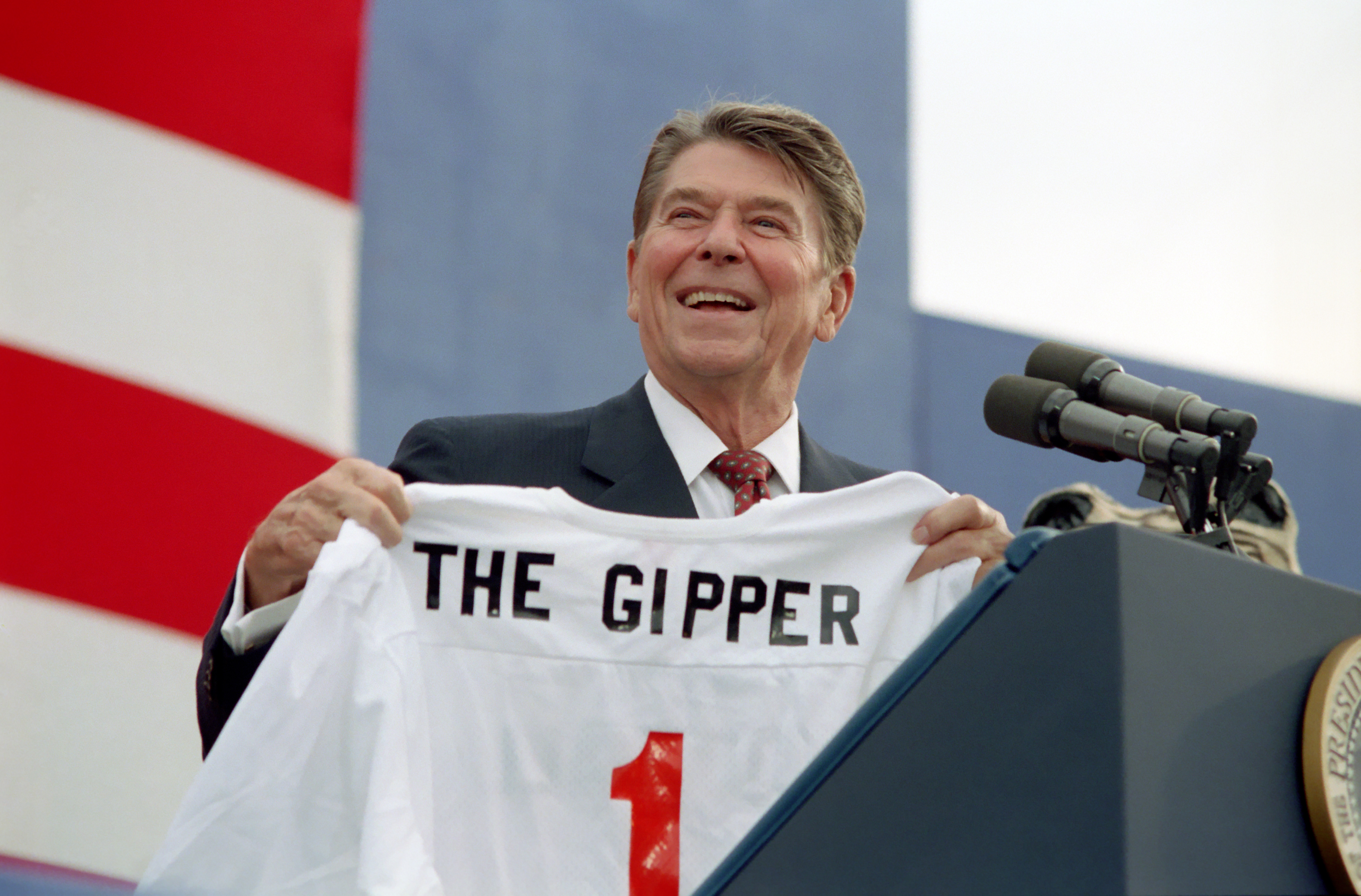
President Reagan holding a "The Gipper" jersey at a campaign rally in Endicott, New York, 1984.

The 1984 United States presidential election in New York took place on November 6, 1984, as part of the 1984 United States presidential election. All 50 States and the District of Columbia participated in this election. Voters in New York chose 36 representatives, or electors to the Electoral College, who selected president and vice president.

New York was won by Ronald Reagan with 53.84% of the popular vote over Walter Mondale with 45.83%, a victory margin of 8.01%. This made New York about 10% more Democratic than the nation overall. This was the third election since the Civil War (the first two being 1952 and 1956), in which New York voted less Democratic than neighboring Pennsylvania.

The county results indicate a then-typical split between New York's rural upstate and the large suburban counties around New York City, on the one hand, and the urban centers of New York City, Buffalo, and Albany, on the other. While Mondale carried the four most heavily populated boroughs of New York City with nearly 63% of the vote, the strong Republican performance across most of the upstate as well as in the heavily populated suburban counties of Nassau, Suffolk, and Westchester was able to secure the state's electoral votes for Reagan.

== Campaign ==
Jesse Jackson's voters were 78% black, 14% white, 6% Hispanic, and 2% were members of other groups. 38% of Jackson voters listed Mondale as their second candidate in exit polls conducted by CBS News and The New York Times' while 24% listed Hart and 29% selected none.

== Results ==
1984 United States presidential election in New York
Party	Candidate	Votes	Percentage	Electoral votes
Republican	Ronald Reagan	3,376,519	49.61%	
Conservative	Ronald Reagan	288,244	4.23%	
Total	Ronald Reagan (incumbent)	3,664,763	53.84%	36
Democratic	Walter Mondale	3,001,285	44.09%	
Liberal	Walter Mondale	118,324	1.74%	
Total	Walter Mondale	3,119,609	45.83%	0
Free Libertarian	David Bergland	11,949	0.18%	0
Communist Party	Gus Hall	4,226	0.06%	0
New Alliance	Dennis Serrette	3,200	0.05%	0
Workers World	Larry Holmes	2,226	0.03%	0
Write-in		837	0.01%	0
Totals		6,806,810	100.0%	36

=== New York City results ===
Results in New York City by borough

1984 Presidential Election in New York City		Manhattan	The Bronx	Brooklyn	Queens	Staten Island	Total	
Democratic- Liberal	Walter Mondale	379,521	223,112	368,518	328,379	44,345	1,343,875	60.96%
Democratic- Liberal	Walter Mondale	72.06%	66.86%	61.34%	53.34%	34.69%	1,343,875	60.96%
Republican- Conservative	Ronald Reagan	144,281	109,308	230,064	285,477	83,187	852,317	38.66%
Republican- Conservative	Ronald Reagan	27.39%	32.76%	38.29%	46.38%	65.08%	852,317	38.66%
Free Libertarian	David Bergland	988	347	744	676	161	2,916	0.13%
Free Libertarian	David Bergland	0.19%	0.10%	0.12%	0.11%	0.13%	2,916	0.13%
Communist	Gus Hall	940	335	663	497	44	2,479	0.11%
Communist	Gus Hall	0.18%	0.10%	0.11%	0.08%	0.03%	2,479	0.11%
New Alliance	Dennis L. Serrette	619	379	505	331	36	1,870	0.08%
New Alliance	Dennis L. Serrette	0.12%	0.11%	0.08%	0.05%	0.03%	1,870	0.08%
Workers’ World	Larry Holmes	295	186	266	218	31	996	0.05%
Workers’ World	Larry Holmes	0.06%	0.06%	0.04%	0.04%	0.02%	996	0.05%
TOTAL		526,671	333,683	600,771	615,578	127,826	2,204,529	100.00%

=== By congressional district ===
Reagan won 22 of 34 congressional districts, including eight held by Democrats and one by a Conservative. Mondale won 12 districts, including one held by a Republican.

District	Reagan	Mondale	Representative
1st	66%	34%	William Carney
2nd	66%	34%	Thomas Downey
3rd	64%	36%	Robert J. Mrazek
4th	64%	36%	Norman F. Lent
5th	60%	40%	Ray McGrath
6th	33%	67%	Joseph P. Addabbo
7th	47%	53%	Gary Ackerman
8th	47%	53%	James H. Scheuer
9th	57%	43%	Geraldine Ferraro
9th	57%	43%	Thomas Manton
10th	49%	51%	Chuck Schumer
11th	21%	79%	Edolphus Towns
12th	14%	86%	Major Owens
13th	47%	53%	Stephen Solarz
14th	66%	34%	Guy Molinari
15th	40%	60%	Bill Green
16th	16%	84%	Charles Rangel
17th	25%	75%	Ted Weiss
18th	19%	81%	Bob Garcia
19th	52%	48%	Mario Biaggi
20th	56%	44%	Richard Ottinger
20th	56%	44%	Joe DioGuardi
21st	68%	32%	Hamilton Fish IV
22nd	62%	38%	Benjamin Gilman
23rd	53%	47%	Samuel S. Stratton
24th	69%	31%	Gerry Solomon
25th	63%	37%	Sherwood Boehlert
26th	66%	34%	David O'Brien Martin
27th	61%	39%	George C. Wortley
28th	61%	39%	Matt McHugh
29th	61%	39%	Frank Horton
30th	63%	37%	Barber Conable
30th	63%	37%	Fred J. Eckert
31st	62%	38%	Jack Kemp
32nd	55%	45%	John LaFalce
33rd	37%	63%	Henry J. Nowak
34th	68%	32%	Stan Lundine

=== Results by county ===
County	Ronald Reagan Republican/Conservative		Walter Mondale Democratic/Liberal		Various candidates Other parties		Margin		Total votes cast
County	#	%	#	%	#	%	#	%	Total votes cast
Albany	74,542	49.50%	75,447	50.10%	603	0.40%	-905	-0.60%	150,592
Allegany	14,527	75.25%	4,720	24.45%	57	0.30%	9,807	50.80%	19,304
Bronx	109,308	32.76%	223,112	66.86%	1,263	0.38%	-113,804	-34.10%	333,683
Broome	58,109	60.47%	37,658	39.19%	322	0.34%	20,451	21.28%	96,089
Cattaraugus	24,162	70.10%	10,194	29.58%	112	0.32%	13,968	40.52%	34,468
Cayuga	21,451	63.50%	12,207	36.14%	121	0.36%	9,244	27.36%	33,779
Chautauqua	39,597	63.13%	22,986	36.65%	141	0.22%	16,611	26.48%	62,724
Chemung	24,909	62.83%	14,638	36.92%	100	0.25%	10,271	25.91%	39,647
Chenango	14,254	69.03%	6,343	30.72%	51	0.25%	7,911	38.31%	20,648
Clinton	19,549	64.22%	10,804	35.49%	90	0.30%	8,745	28.73%	30,443
Columbia	18,814	67.46%	8,960	32.13%	117	0.42%	9,854	35.33%	27,891
Cortland	13,691	67.70%	6,438	31.83%	95	0.47%	7,253	35.87%	20,224
Delaware	14,002	70.61%	5,745	28.97%	83	0.42%	8,257	41.64%	19,830
Dutchess	70,324	67.89%	32,867	31.73%	389	0.38%	37,457	36.16%	103,580
Erie	222,882	48.28%	237,631	51.47%	1,158	0.25%	-14,749	-3.19%	461,671
Essex	12,114	69.94%	5,119	29.56%	87	0.50%	6,995	40.38%	17,320
Franklin	10,617	62.22%	6,400	37.51%	47	0.28%	4,217	24.71%	17,064
Fulton	14,887	65.82%	7,644	33.80%	87	0.38%	7,243	32.02%	22,618
Genesee	16,582	65.78%	8,549	33.91%	79	0.31%	8,033	31.87%	25,210
Greene	14,150	70.50%	5,858	29.19%	62	0.31%	8,292	41.31%	20,070
Hamilton	2,637	77.97%	737	21.79%	8	0.24%	1,900	56.18%	3,382
Herkimer	18,827	64.35%	10,346	35.36%	85	0.29%	8,481	28.99%	29,258
Jefferson	23,445	67.96%	10,960	31.77%	91	0.26%	12,485	36.19%	34,496
Kings	230,064	38.29%	368,518	61.34%	2,189	0.36%	-138,454	-23.05%	600,771
Lewis	7,069	71.69%	2,757	27.96%	34	0.34%	4,312	43.73%	9,860
Livingston	16,389	68.60%	7,399	30.97%	104	0.44%	8,990	37.63%	23,892
Madison	17,568	67.67%	8,291	31.93%	104	0.40%	9,277	35.74%	25,963
Monroe	182,696	57.76%	132,109	41.77%	1,472	0.47%	50,587	15.99%	316,277
Montgomery	14,398	61.22%	9,044	38.45%	78	0.33%	5,354	22.77%	23,520
Nassau	392,017	61.83%	240,697	37.96%	1,349	0.21%	151,320	23.87%	634,063
New York	144,281	27.39%	379,521	72.06%	2,869	0.54%	-235,240	-44.67%	526,671
Niagara	51,289	55.23%	41,368	44.55%	201	0.22%	9,921	10.68%	92,858
Oneida	65,377	60.38%	42,603	39.35%	289	0.27%	22,774	21.03%	108,269
Onondaga	121,857	59.64%	81,777	40.03%	680	0.33%	40,080	19.61%	204,314
Ontario	24,507	65.36%	12,844	34.26%	143	0.38%	11,663	31.10%	37,494
Orange	69,413	67.78%	32,663	31.89%	337	0.33%	36,750	35.89%	102,413
Orleans	10,543	70.17%	4,429	29.48%	52	0.35%	6,114	40.69%	15,024
Oswego	31,481	68.39%	14,347	31.17%	206	0.45%	17,134	37.22%	46,034
Otsego	16,777	63.28%	9,582	36.14%	152	0.57%	7,195	27.14%	26,511
Putnam	25,707	72.87%	9,473	26.85%	97	0.27%	16,234	46.02%	35,277
Queens	285,477	46.38%	328,379	53.34%	1,722	0.28%	-42,902	-6.96%	615,578
Rensselaer	43,892	61.94%	26,755	37.76%	217	0.31%	17,137	24.18%	70,864
Richmond	83,187	65.08%	44,345	34.69%	294	0.23%	38,842	30.39%	127,826
Rockland	70,020	60.88%	44,687	38.85%	311	0.27%	25,333	22.03%	115,018
St. Lawrence	26,062	61.83%	15,963	37.87%	124	0.29%	10,099	23.96%	42,149
Saratoga	47,394	67.91%	22,166	31.76%	228	0.33%	25,228	36.15%	69,788
Schenectady	42,808	58.09%	30,612	41.54%	277	0.38%	12,196	16.55%	73,697
Schoharie	8,692	67.97%	3,996	31.25%	100	0.78%	4,696	36.72%	12,788
Schuyler	5,207	67.98%	2,422	31.62%	31	0.40%	2,785	36.36%	7,660
Seneca	9,420	65.84%	4,825	33.72%	62	0.43%	4,595	32.12%	14,307
Steuben	28,848	73.19%	10,471	26.56%	98	0.25%	18,377	46.63%	39,417
Suffolk	335,485	66.03%	171,295	33.72%	1,276	0.25%	164,190	32.31%	508,056
Sullivan	18,037	63.09%	10,475	36.64%	78	0.27%	7,562	26.45%	28,590
Tioga	14,856	71.36%	5,860	28.15%	101	0.49%	8,996	43.21%	20,817
Tompkins	18,255	48.32%	19,357	51.24%	165	0.44%	-1,102	-2.92%	37,777
Ulster	47,372	63.93%	26,445	35.69%	285	0.38%	20,927	28.24%	74,102
Warren	17,616	74.75%	5,886	24.97%	66	0.28%	11,730	49.78%	23,568
Washington	16,580	73.48%	5,909	26.19%	74	0.33%	10,671	47.29%	22,563
Wayne	24,171	70.98%	9,700	28.49%	180	0.53%	14,471	42.49%	34,051
Westchester	229,005	58.67%	160,225	41.05%	1,078	0.28%	68,780	17.62%	390,308
Wyoming	11,199	71.69%	4,381	28.04%	42	0.27%	6,818	43.65%	15,622
Yates	6,367	70.26%	2,670	29.46%	25	0.28%	3,697	40.80%	9,062
Totals	3,664,763	53.84%	3,119,609	45.83%	22,438	0.33%	545,154	8.01%	6,806,810

==== Counties that flipped from Democratic to Republican ====
- Monroe
- Niagara

==== Counties that flipped from Republican to Democratic ====
- Tompkins

== Analysis ==
Mondale carried Tompkins County, home of the college town of Ithaca. He was only the third Democrat to do so since the Civil War, after Woodrow Wilson in 1912 and Lyndon B. Johnson in 1964. Reagan thus became the first-ever Republican to win the White House without carrying this county since the Republican Party's founding in 1854. Mondale managing to win Tompkins County even whilst losing the national popular vote by over 18% indicated the county's strong Democratic trend; it has given every subsequent Democratic nominee a double-digit margin, every Democrat from 2004 on over 60%, and every Democrat from 2008 on over 66% of its vote. This was among a handful of counties nationwide that flipped against Reagan. (Note: Along with Keweenaw County, Michigan, Marin County, California, Santa Cruz County, California, Tompkins County, New York, Arlington County, Virginia, Alexandria, Virginia, and Lane County, Oregon.)

As of 2024, this remains the last time that New York has been carried by a Republican presidential nominee, as well as the last time that Schenectady County has done so. Broome and Niagara counties would not vote Republican again until 2016.

== See also ==
- United States presidential elections in New York
- Presidency of Ronald Reagan

== Works cited ==
- Ranney, Austin, ed. (1985). The American Elections of 1984. Duke University Press. ISBN 0822302306.
