= James Hanley =

James Hanley or Jim Hanley may refer to:

- James Hanley (painter) (born 1965), Irish painter
- Jim Hanley (medical statistician) (born 1947), Irish-born Canadian epidemiologist
- James M. Hanley (1920–2003), American politician
- Jimmy Hanley (1918 – 1970), English actor
- James Hanley (novelist) (1897–1985), British novelist and playwright
- James F. Hanley (1892–1942), American songwriter
- Jim Hanley (baseball) (1885–1961), Major League Baseball pitcher
- James Hanley (hurler) (1877–1915), Irish hurler
- James Hanley (California politician) (1847–1916), Los Angeles, California, railroad man and politician
