= Bernard W. Kearney =

American politician

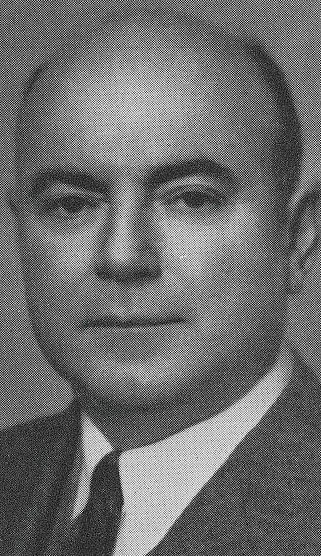
- Kearney as a Member of Congress in 1944

Member of the U.S. House of Representatives from New York
- In office January 3, 1943 – January 3, 1959
- Preceded by: Frank Crowther
- Succeeded by: Samuel S. Stratton
- Constituency: 30th district (1943–45); 31st district (1945–53); 32nd district (1953–59)

District Attorney of Fulton County, New York
- In office January 1, 1931 – December 31, 1942
- Preceded by: Edward K. Cassedy
- Succeeded by: Willard L. Best

Personal details
- Born: May 23, 1889 Ithaca, New York, U.S.
- Died: June 3, 1976 (aged 87) Venice, Florida, U.S.
- Resting place: Arlington National Cemetery
- Party: Republican
- Education: Albany Law School
- Profession: Attorney
- Civilian awards: Philippine Legion of Honor

Military service
- Allegiance: United States
- Branch/service: United States Army; New York National Guard
- Rank: Major general
- Unit: New York National Guard
- Commands: 105th Infantry Regiment (NYNG); 53rd Brigade (NYNG); 27th Division (NYNG)
- Battles/wars: Pancho Villa Expedition; World War I World War II
- Military awards: Legion of Honor (Officer) (France); Croix de Guerre (France)

Bernard William "Pat" Kearney (May 23, 1889 – June 3, 1976) was a Republican member of the United States House of Representatives from New York. Kearney served on the U.S. House of Representatives' Un-American Activities Committee (HUAC) during the Cold War.

A native of Ithaca, New York, and a graduate of Albany Law School, in 1914, Kearney began a practice in Gloversville. He enlisted in the New York National Guard in 1909, and took part in the 1916 border patrol mission that was part of the Pancho Villa Expedition. During World War I he completed officer training, received a commission, and served in France as a member of the 27th Division. Kearney was prominent in veterans affairs, and served as National Commander of the Veterans of Foreign Wars from 1936 to 1937. He remained in the National Guard after the war, attained the rank of brigadier general, and retired in 1940. During World War II, Kearney served in the New York Guard, and commanded a brigade. During the National Guard's post-World War II reorganization, he was recalled to service, promoted to major general, and assigned as commander of the 27th Infantry Division. He retired from the military again in 1948.

Active in local politics and government, beginning in 1920, Kearney served in legal offices including Gloversville city judge, assistant district attorney of Hamilton and Fulton Counties, and district attorney of Fulton County. In 1942, he was elected to the U.S. House. He was reelected seven times, and served from 1943 to 1959. In the House, Kearney was a prominent anti-communist and advocate for veterans. He co-authored and helped shepherd the GI Bill to passage, and was credited as the originator of the law's title.

Kearney did not run for reelection in 1958. In retirement he was a resident of Canandaigua, New York, and Venice, Florida. He died in Venice in 1976, and was buried at Arlington National Cemetery.

== Early life and education ==
Kearney was born in Ithaca, New York, on May 23, 1889, the son of Patrick B. Kearney, a clothier, and Josephine M. (Oster) Kearney. He graduated from Albany Law School in 1914, where he was a member of the Delta Chi fraternity, and became an attorney in Gloversville.

He served in the New York National Guard from 1909 until 1917, first as a member of Company G, 2nd New York Infantry, and then with Troop B, 1st New York Cavalry. He served on the border with Mexico during the Pancho Villa Expedition, attended Officer Training School at Fort Niagara and received his commission in 1917.

== Legal career ==
Kearney practiced law in Hamilton and Fulton Counties. He was the City Judge of Gloversville from 1920 to 1924. He served as Assistant District Attorney of Hamilton County from 1924 to 1929, and Fulton County from 1929 to 1931. He was Fulton County District Attorney from 1931 to 1942.

== World War I ==
Kearney served in France as a member of units in the 27th Division during World War I, and saw combat at St. Mihiel and Meuse-Argonne. He received the French Legion of Honor (Officer) and Croix de Guerre.

== Post World War I ==
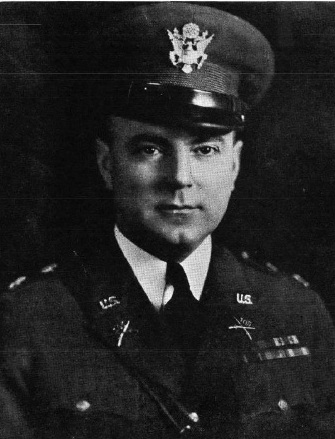
Kearney at time of appointment to command New York's 53rd Brigade.

He continued his National Guard service after the war, commanding the 105th Infantry Regiment as a colonel, and the 53rd Brigade as a brigadier general. He retired from the National Guard in 1940.

Active in veterans organizations, Kearney served as National Commander of the Veterans of Foreign Wars from 1936 to 1937.

== World War II ==
During World War II Kearney commanded a brigade in the New York Guard, the volunteer organization that performed the New York National Guard's stateside functions while National Guard soldiers were serving overseas.

== Post World War II ==
When the 27th and 42nd Infantry Divisions were fielded in New York as part of the National Guard's post-war reorganization, Kearney was recalled from retirement, promoted to major general, and assigned as commander of the 27th Division. He retired again in 1948 and was succeeded as division commander by Ronald C. Brock.

== Congressional career ==
Kearney was elected to the United States House of Representatives in 1942, and served eight terms, January 3, 1943, to January 3, 1959. He rose to become the ranking Republican member of the House Un-American Activities Committee, and developed a reputation as a staunch anti-communist. His major legislative accomplishment was co-authorship and passage of the GI Bill to benefit veterans returning from World War II. Kearney was also given credit for having suggested the law's title. Kearney voted in favor of the Civil Rights Act of 1957.

== Retirement and death ==
Kearney did not run for reelection in 1958. In retirement he resided in Canandaigua, New York and Venice, Florida.

In 1959 Congress passed special legislation authorizing Kearney to accept and wear the Philippine Legion of Honor (Commander). He received this award in 1953 to acknowledge his support for and efforts to boost the morale of the Philippine resistance during the Japanese occupation of World War II.

He died in Venice on June 3, 1976. He is buried in Arlington National Cemetery, Section 30, Grave 352.

== See also ==
- List of members of the House Un-American Activities Committee

U.S. House of Representatives
Preceded by Frank Crowther	Member of the U.S. House of Representatives from New York's 30th congressional district 1943–1945	Succeeded by Jay LeFevre
Preceded by Clarence E. Kilburn	Member of the U.S. House of Representatives from New York's 31st congressional district 1945–1953	Succeeded by Dean P. Taylor
Preceded by Leo W. O'Brien	Member of the U.S. House of Representatives from New York's 32nd congressional district 1953–1959	Succeeded by Samuel S. Stratton
