= Jim Hanley (medical statistician) =

Jim Hanley (born James Anthony Hanley on June 5, 1947) is an Irish-born Canadian medical statistician, who is professor emeritus in the Department of Epidemiology, Biostatistics and Occupational Health at McGill University in Montreal, Canada. He is known for his contributions to applied biostatistics and statistical methods in epidemiology, particularly in diagnostic testing, and disease screening.

== Early life and education ==
Hanley was born in Castletownbere, County Cork, Ireland and grew up on nearby Bere Island.

He earned a B.Sc. in Mathematics and Statistics in 1968 and an M.Sc. in Mathematics and Statistics in 1969, both from University College Cork. He then moved to Canada to pursue his Ph.D. in Statistics and Biometry, which he received in 1973 from the University of Waterloo.

== Career ==
Following his doctoral studies, Hanley worked at State University of New York at Buffalo as a Research Assistant Professor (1973–1977) and then at Harvard School of Public Health as an assistant professor in the Department of Epidemiology and Biostatistics (1977–1980). In 1980, he returned to Canada and accepted a position at McGill University, where he became a professor in the Department of Epidemiology, Biostatistics and Occupational Health. He was also an associate member of the Department of Mathematics and Statistics.

He also served as a senior scientist in the Division of Clinical Epidemiology at the Royal Victoria Hospital, Montreal.

His research interests include receiver operating characteristic (ROC) analysis. His paper on this topic with Barbara McNeil was hugely influential and has been cited more than twelve thousand times.

== Research and contributions ==
Hanley's research has influenced public health policy and clinical practice, especially in relation to screening recommendations.

He has served as an Associate Editor for journals such as Biometrics, Statistics in Medicine, the Canadian Medical Association Journal, and Medical Decision Making.

Beyond his applied work, Hanley has written and lectured on the history of statistics, including studies on the development of regression, the Poisson distribution, and early statistical thinking.

=== Selected works ===
Hanley has authored over 90 peer-reviewed research papers and numerous editorials and invited publications in statistics and epidemiology.

- 2010 "Problem of immortal time bias in cohort studies: example using statins for preventing progression of diabetes." British Medical Journal.
- 2007 "Human papillomavirus DNA versus Papanicolaou screening tests for cervical cancer." New England Journal of Medicine.
- 2003 "Statistical analysis of correlated data using generalized estimating equations: an orientation." American Journal of Epidemiology.
- 1983 "A method of comparing the areas under receiver operating characteristic curves derived from the same cases." Radiology.
- 1982 "The meaning and use of the area under a receiver operating characteristic (ROC) curve." Radiology.

== Awards and honors ==
- 2011 Principal's Prize for Excellence in Teaching, McGill University
- 2016 Award for Impact of Applied and Collaborative Work from the Statistical Society of Canada
- 2017 Lifetime Achievement Award from the Canadian Society for Epidemiology and Biostatistics
- 2024 Honorary Member of the Statistical Society of Canada
- 2026 SSC Distinguished Educator Award from the Statistical Society of Canada

== Personal life ==
Hanley was born and raised in Ireland before relocating to Canada. He is married and has four sons.
