= Alden W. Clausen =

American businessman

Tom Clausen

President of the World Bank Group
- In office July 1, 1981 – June 30, 1986
- Preceded by: Robert McNamara
- Succeeded by: Barber Conable

Personal details
- Born: Alden Winship Clausen; February 17, 1923 Hamilton, Illinois, U.S.
- Died: January 21, 2013 (aged 89) Burlingame, California, U.S.
- Party: Republican
- Education: Carthage College (BA); University of Minnesota, Twin Cities (LLB)

Alden Winship "Tom" Clausen (February 17, 1923 – January 21, 2013) was President of the World Bank from 1981 to 1986. He was also president and CEO of Bank of America in 1970 and again in 1986.

== Education ==
Clausen was born in Hamilton, Illinois to a family of Norwegian and German ancestry. He was the son of Morton Clausen, owner, editor and publisher of the Hamilton Press, the town's weekly newspaper. His mother was Elsie Emma Kroll. He graduated from Carthage College in 1944 with a BA (and was awarded an honorary LLD in 1970), from the University of Minnesota Law School in 1949 with a LLB, and attended the Harvard University's six-week Advanced Management Program in 1966.

== Bank of America ==
Clausen was certified to practice law after graduating from the University of Minnesota Law School, but instead he got a job at the Bank of America in Los Angeles, California. He became vice president in 1961, senior vice president in 1965, executive vice president in 1968, vice chairman of the board in 1969, and president and CEO in 1970.

== World Bank ==
In 1981 Clausen was appointed president of the World Bank. He was replaced five years later by Barber Conable. His term as World Bank president saw the massive scaling up of structural adjustment lending that had been introduced under his predecessor Robert McNamara.

== Return to Bank of America ==
Clausen returned to Bank of America as chairman and CEO in 1986 but stepped back from an active executive role in 1990 to be chairman of the executive committee. During his time at the bank he helped it grow to be the biggest commercial bank in the United States. Clausen was also a member of the Advisor Council of SRI International and was on the board of governors of United Way.

== Legacy ==
- In 1980, Clausen received the Golden Plate Award of the American Academy of Achievement presented by Awards Council member Stephen Bechtel Sr.
- A.W. Clausen Center for World Business at Carthage College in Kenosha, Wisconsin, is named in his honor.
- Clausen Center for International Business and Policy at the Haas School of Business, University of California, Berkeley was endowed by a gift from Peggy and Tom Clausen in 1995.

Diplomatic posts
Preceded by Robert McNamara	President of the World Bank Group; 1981–1986	Succeeded by Barber Conable
