= Alexander Pirnie Federal Building =

- U.S. Post Office, Court House and Custom House
- U.S. National Register of Historic Places
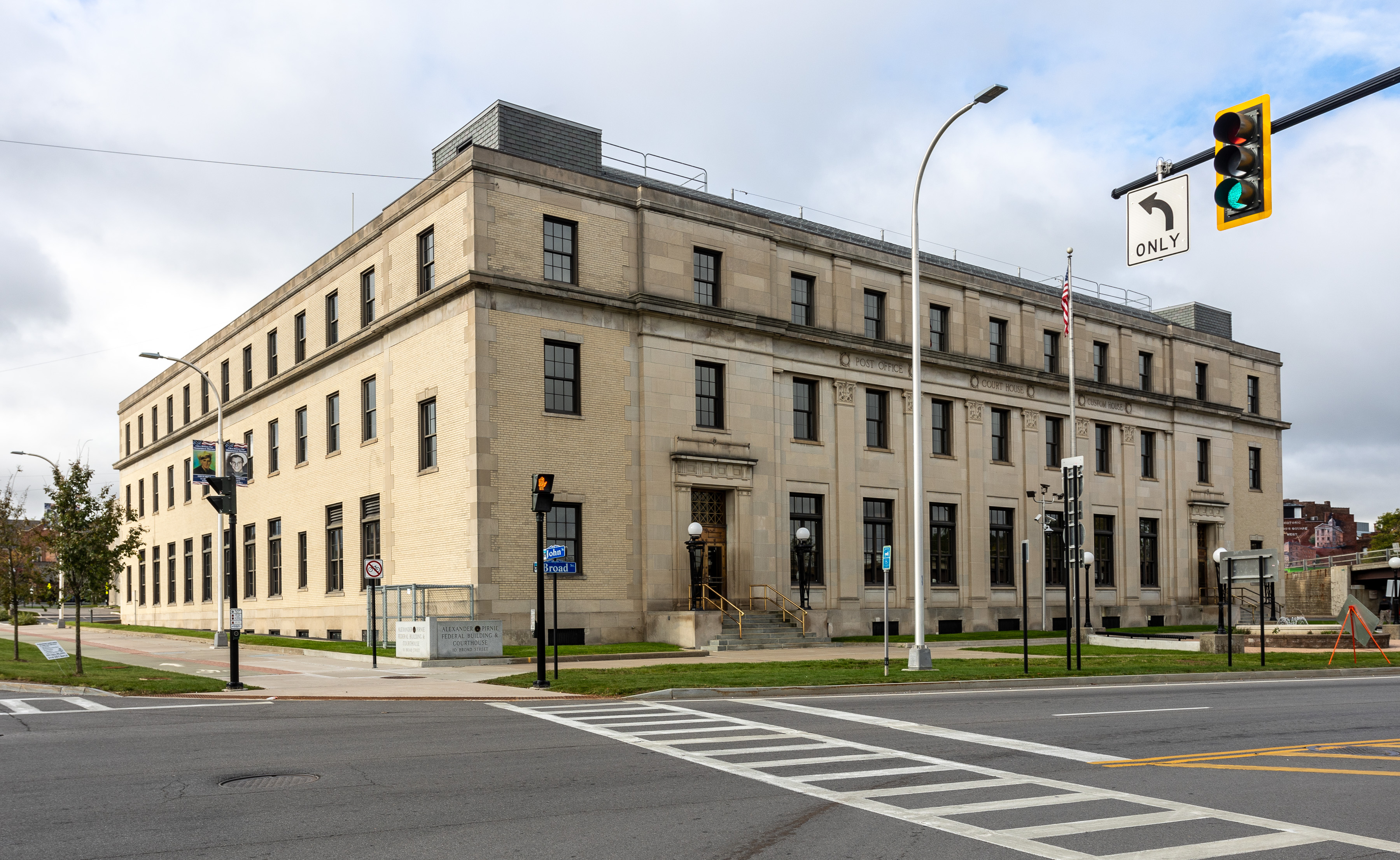

- Location within New York Location within the United States
- Location: 10 Broad St., Utica, New York
- Coordinates: 43°06′14″N 75°13′42″W
- Built: 1928-1929
- Architect: Office of the Supervising Architect under James A. Wetmore
- Architectural style: Stripped Classicism
- NRHP reference No.: 15000609
- Added to NRHP: September 17, 2015

Alexander Pirnie Federal Building is a historic post office, courthouse, and custom house located at Utica, Oneida County, New York. It was named for Congressman Alexander Pirnie in 1984. It was listed on the National Register of Historic Places in 2015. It remains in use as a courthouse for the United States District Court for the Northern District of New York.

== Architectural description ==
The U.S. Post Office, Courthouse, and Custom House in Utica occupies a full block bounded by Broad Street on the north, John Street on the east, Catherine Street on the south, and Franklin Street on the west. Located on the edge of downtown, the limestone-and-brick building is separated by an elevated viaduct which dominates the site. Its simple classicized detailing sets it apart from the many Victorian buildings in downtown Utica. Constructed in 1928 and 1929, the three-story building rises above a slightly raised basement and is an excellent example of Starved Classicism. The height of the building from first floor level to courtroom parapet is about 58 feet. The basement, first floor, and second floor are approximately square in plan and the third floor is U-shaped. The walls of the building are clad with buff-colored brick, except for the base and center front which are clad in limestone. All of the windows are double hung. The original wood sashes have been replaced with bronze anodized aluminum units.

The Broad Street facade is 166 feet long and is divided into eleven bays. The base course serves as a plinth for two-story Corinthian pilasters which mark the bays and support an entablature which extends the full length of the facade. Inscribed in the center of the frieze are the words "Post Office," "Court House," and "Custom House." The two front entrances, at opposite ends of the north elevation, have granite steps bounded by limestone-clad cheek walls. Around the doorway are fluted Tuscan-order pilasters and an entablature. The facade is topped by a simple cornice and a pitched slate roof. Limestone and brick elevator penthouses rise from the pitched roof at each corner.

The John Street (side) facade faces east and is 161 feet long divided into thirteen bays. The base is limestone and the first through third floors are brick. An entablature, continuing around from the front, separates the second and third floors. The facade is topped by a slate-covered pitched roof. The northernmost bay reflects the front corner, as both edges of the bay have limestone quoins, and above this bay is the elevator penthouse.

The Franklin Street (side) facade on the west is nearly identical to the east facade except that the rear six bays of the third floor extend up above the pitched roof to allow for the additional height of the courtroom. The cornice at the eave line extends across this facade, and at the top of this section is a parapet.

The Catherine Street (rear) facade reflects the complexities of the building's plan in that the ends of the U-shaped third floor face the rear. Across the rear at the base of the building is a loading platform which served the postal workroom, and which is also covered by two flat overhanging canopies. The facade is 166 feet long divided into fifteen bays and is entirely clad with brick. Limestone quoins decorate each corner.

The U-shaped third floor has a light court which opens to the rear. The courtroom is at the end of the west wing. At the center rear of the light court is the freight elevator penthouse. The roof along the north side is gabled and the roofs along the east wing and half of the west wing are truncated gables. The end of the east wing is hipped. The courtroom, located at the end of the west wing, has a flat roof. The second floor center light court extends down to the first-floor skylights, and this roof is also flat.

The public lobby which extends across the front of the building is one of the most elaborate spaces in the building. The lobby floor is terrazzo with oriental red and white marble borders covers the lobby floor. Round arched openings on either side of the elevator lead to the stairways. Wide corridors opposite the vestibules extend toward the rear from the lobby. The remainder of the first floor is the postal workroom which has been partitioned off. Some remaining areas of the workroom have their original finishes. The floor, bases, wainscots, and trim are all wood, and the walls and ceilings are plaster.

Courtroom

The other architecturally significant interior space is the courtroom. It is particularly noteworthy because the original cork-tile floor and all of the original furniture remain intact. Located on the third floor the seventeen-foot-high space is entered through a pair of leather covered and obscure glass doors along the side of the room. All of the walls are paneled with walnut which is set in panels between pilasters. At the top of the wall is an architrave with triglyphs. The ceiling is plaster and has a fret work plaster cornice. The judge's and clerk's desks are walnut with applied classical detailing.

== Construction history and space inventory ==
=== Building details ===
Square Footage	Building Dimensions	
Floor Area Total:	93646	Stories/Levels: 3
First Floor Area:	28917	Perimeter: 654(Linear Ft.)
Occupiable Area:	53125	Depth: 0(Linear Ft.)
	Height:	58(Linear Ft.)
	Length:	0(Linear Ft.)

=== Construction history ===
Start Year	End Year	Description	Architect
1928	1929	Original Construction	Office of the Supervising Architect under James A. Wetmore
1963	0	new bronze entry doors	unknown
1966	0	Replacement of slate on roof	
1983	0	2nd floor rehabilitation	unknown
1986	0	major site work	Beardsley, Cowden and Glass
1987	0	repairs, alterations	Quinlevan, Pierik, Krause

== Significance ==
Since 1882 this has been the site of Utica's Post Office. The first building was two stories tall with a stone basement. The building itself was constructed of red brick with stone detailing. The 1927 plans for the current building refer to this project as the "Enlargement, Extension, Remodeling, etc." of the U.S. Post Office, Custom House, and Courthouse in Utica, New York; a curious title since there are few remnants of the original building. The only remaining portions are massive stone walls and vaults which were the basement of the earlier building.

Construction of the Utica Post Office and Custom Building was authorized by the Public Buildings Act of 1926, which also specified that the Supervising Architect of the Department of the Treasury was to be responsible for the design of all public buildings. The building was designed in 1927 by the Office of the Supervising Architect under James A. Wetmore. It has historical significance as Utica's Main Post Office, Custom House, and Courthouse for almost 50 years. Because of its size and location on the edge of downtown, it stands out as a local landmark. As a good example of Starved Classicism, a style common to public buildings of the 1920s and 1930s, its simple classicized detailing sets it apart from the many Victorian buildings in downtown Utica. Starved Classicism is a restrained, undetailed version of the Neo-Classical Revival, and the Utica building is an excellent example of this architectural style.
