= Frank Crowther =

American politician (1870–1955)

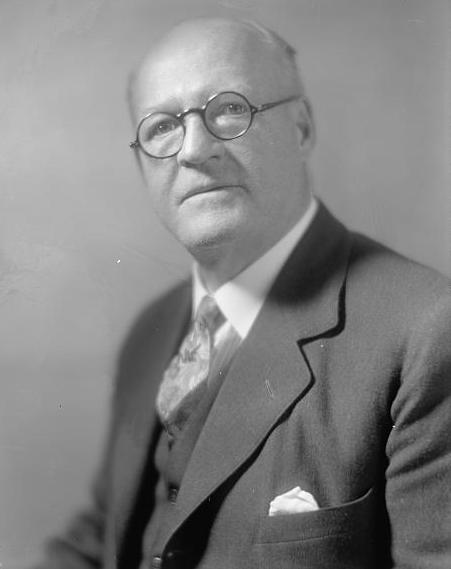

Chairman of the Committee on Memorials
- In office 1929–1931

Member of the U.S. House of Representatives from New York's 30th district
- In office March 4, 1919 – January 3, 1943
- Preceded by: George R. Lunn
- Succeeded by: Bernard W. Kearney

Schenectady President of the common council
- In office 1917–1918

New Jersey General Assembly
- In office 1904–1905

Personal details
- Born: July 10, 1870 Liverpool, Lancashire, England
- Died: July 20, 1955 (aged 85) Pueblo, Colorado, U.S.
- Party: Republican
- Education: Lowell School of Design; Harvard Dental School

Frank Crowther (July 10, 1870 – July 20, 1955) was a United States representative from New York. Born in Liverpool, England, he emigrated to the United States in 1872 with his parents, who settled in Canton, Massachusetts. He attended the public schools, graduated from the Lowell School of Design (a branch of the Massachusetts Institute of Technology) in 1888 and was a designer of fabrics, carpets, and rugs for seven years. He graduated from the Harvard Dental School in 1898 and commenced practice in Boston; in 1901 he moved to Perth Amboy, New Jersey, and continued the practice of dentistry. He was a member of the New Jersey General Assembly in 1904 and 1905 and a member of the Middlesex County Board of Taxation from 1906 to 1909.

In 1912, Crowther moved to Schenectady, New York, and continued the practice of his profession until elected to Congress; he was president of the common council of Schenectady in 1917 and 1918, and elected as a Republican to the Sixty-sixth and to the eleven succeeding Congresses, holding office from March 4, 1919 to January 3, 1943. During the Seventy-first Congress he was chairman of the Committee on Memorials. He was not a candidate for renomination in 1942 and in 1943 moved to Pueblo, Colorado, and engaged in violin study, landscape painting, and public speaking. He died in Pueblo in 1955; interment was in Roselawn Cemetery.

U.S. House of Representatives
| Preceded by George R. Lunn | Member of the U.S. House of Representatives from New York's 30th congressional district 1919–1943 | Succeeded by Bernard W. Kearney |
