= Alexander Pirnie =

American politician (1903–1982)

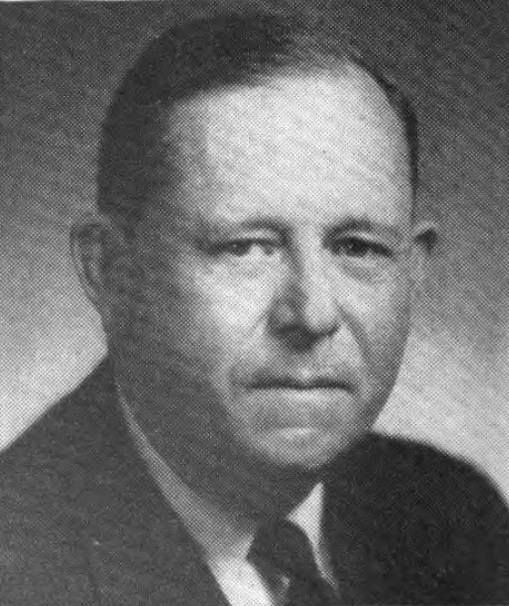

Member of the U.S. House of Representatives from New York's 34th (1959–63) 32nd (1963–73) district
- In office January 3, 1959 – January 3, 1973
- Preceded by: William R. Williams
- Succeeded by: Donald J. Mitchell (redistricted)

Personal details
- Born: April 16, 1903 Pulaski, New York, U.S.
- Died: June 12, 1982 (aged 79) Canastota, New York, U.S.
- Party: Republican
- Education: Cornell University; Cornell Law School

Military service
- Branch/service: United States Army (Officers Reserve Corps)
- Rank: Colonel
- Battles/wars: World War II
- Awards: Legion of Merit; Bronze Star Medal

Alexander Pirnie (April 16, 1903 – June 12, 1982) was an American politician.

== Early life and education ==
Pirnie was born in Pulaski, New York, on April 16, 1903. In his youth he was educated at Pulaski Academy. He received his undergraduate degree from Cornell University in 1924 and his law degree from Cornell Law School in 1926. While at Cornell, Pirnie was also a member of the Quill and Dagger Society. After attaining admission to the bar, Pirnie practiced law in Utica, New York.

== Military service ==
In 1924, he was commissioned a second lieutenant of Infantry in the Officers Reserve Corps. He later transferred to the Judge Advocate General's Corps, and volunteered to serve in Europe during World War II. Pirnie served as a major on the staff of Theater Service Forces. He received the Bronze Star Medal for his wartime service, and he continued to serve until retiring as a colonel. In 1951, he was elected president of the Judge Advocate's Association. He was a longtime member of the board of visitors at the Judge Advocate General's School. Pirnie received the Legion of Merit at his 1963 retirement ceremony.

== Political career ==
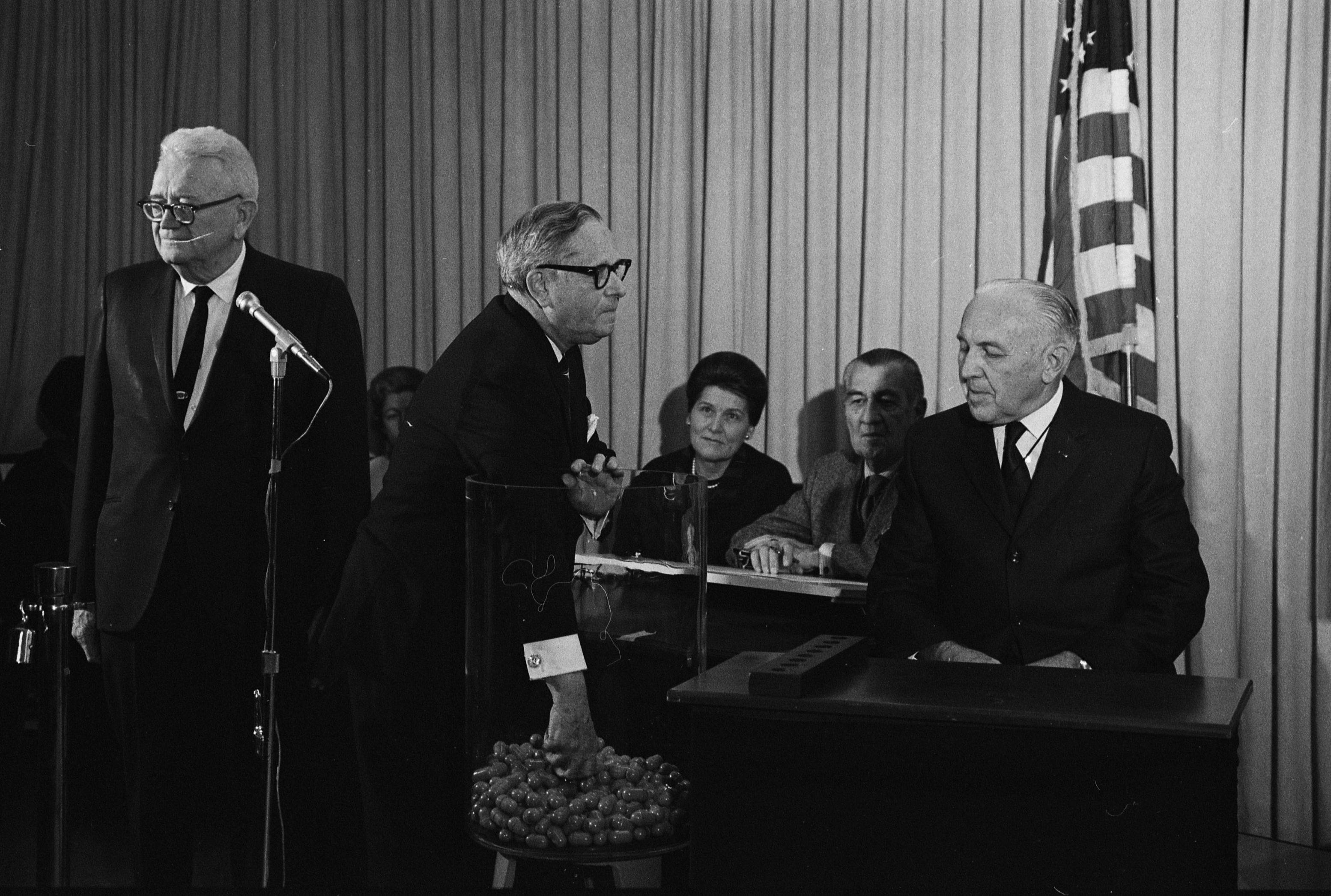
Pirnie drawing the first number.

In 1958, Pirnie was a successful Republican candidate for the United States House of Representatives. He served six terms, 1959 to 1973. While in Congress, Pirnie was the ranking Republican member of the subcommittee that oversaw the 1969 draft for the Vietnam War. In this capacity he drew the first of the 366 capsules used to determine draft eligibility.

(The capsules contained birth dates from January 1 to December 31, including February 29, and individuals born on those days were subject to the draft based on the order in which their birth dates were drawn. The first capsule contained the date September 14, so those born on September 14 were assigned draft number 1. The last capsule drawn was June 8, and those born on that date were assigned draft number 366.)

Pirnie was a member of the Inter-Parliamentary Union from 1965 to 1982.

From 1964 until Pirnie's retirement, Sherwood Boehlert served on his Congressional staff. Boehlert later served as Oneida County Executive, and was a Member of Congress from 1983 to 2007.

== Post political career ==
After leaving Congress he practiced law in Utica and was president of a Mohawk, New York, clothing company from 1977 to 1980.

The federal office building at Utica was named for Pirnie in 1984.

== Personal life and death ==
In retirement Pirnie resided in Utica. He died in Canastota, New York, on June 12, 1982, aged 79. Pirnie was found behind the wheel of his car on the side of the road, and authorities presumed he had a heart attack and died while driving. He was buried in Pulaski Village Cemetery.

U.S. House of Representatives
Preceded by William R. Williams	Member of the U.S. House of Representatives from New York's 34th congressional district 1959–1963	Succeeded by R. Walter Riehlman
Preceded by Samuel S. Stratton	Member of the U.S. House of Representatives from New York's 32nd congressional district 1963–1973	Succeeded by James M. Hanley
