= R. Walter Riehlman =

American politician (1899–1978)

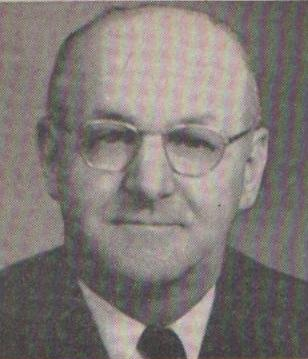

Member of the U.S. House of Representatives from New York
- In office January 3, 1947 – January 3, 1965
- Preceded by: Clarence E. Hancock
- Succeeded by: James M. Hanley
- Constituency: 36th district (1947–1953); 35th district (1953–1963); 34th district (1963–1965)

Personal details
- Born: Roy Walter Riehlman; August 26, 1899 Otisco, New York, U.S.
- Died: July 16, 1978 (aged 78) Ormond Beach, Florida, U.S.
- Party: Republican

Roy Walter Riehlman (August 26, 1899 – July 16, 1978) was an American businessman and member of the United States House of Representatives from New York.

== Early life ==
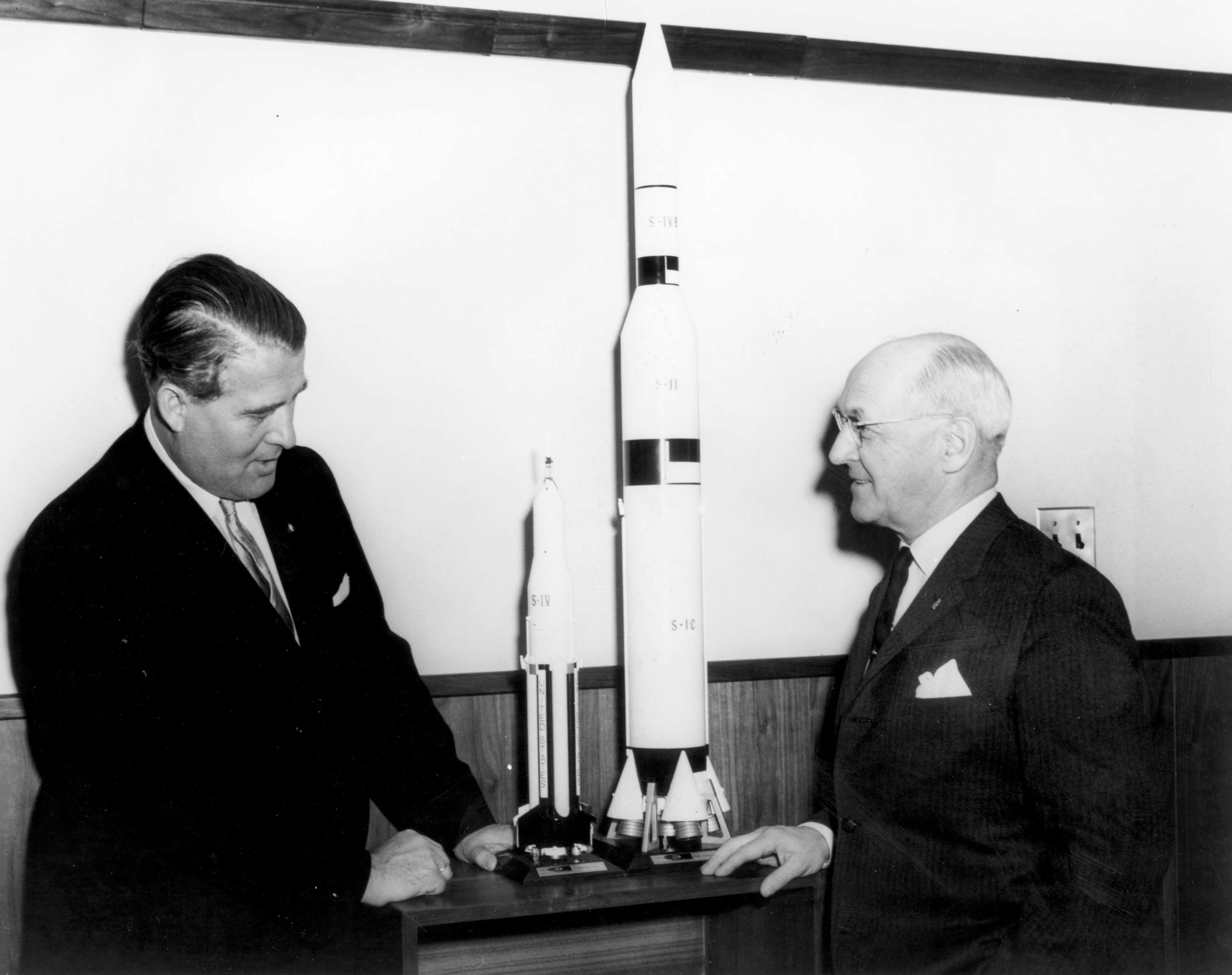
Marshall Space Flight Center Director Wernher von Braun (left) and Riehlman discuss Apollo models.

R. Walter Riehlman was born in Otisco, New York on August 26, 1899. He was raised in Tully, graduated from Manlius Military Academy in 1919 and Central City Business School of Syracuse in 1921.

== Start of career ==
Riehlman operated a general store and served as Postmaster of Nedrow from 1921 to 1923. In 1923 he returned to Tully and became owner a commercial baking company, Tully Bakery.

From 1933 to 1938, Riehlman was a member of the Tully Board of Education. In 1934 he was elected Chairman of Tully's Republican Committee. He was elected to the Onondaga County Board of Supervisors in 1937 and served from 1938 to 1943. From 1943 to 1946 he was Onondaga County Clerk.

Riehlman was also active in civic affairs and several local businesses, including serving on the advisory board of the Marine Midland Trust Company and the area board of directors of Virginia's Lynchburg College.

== Congressional career ==
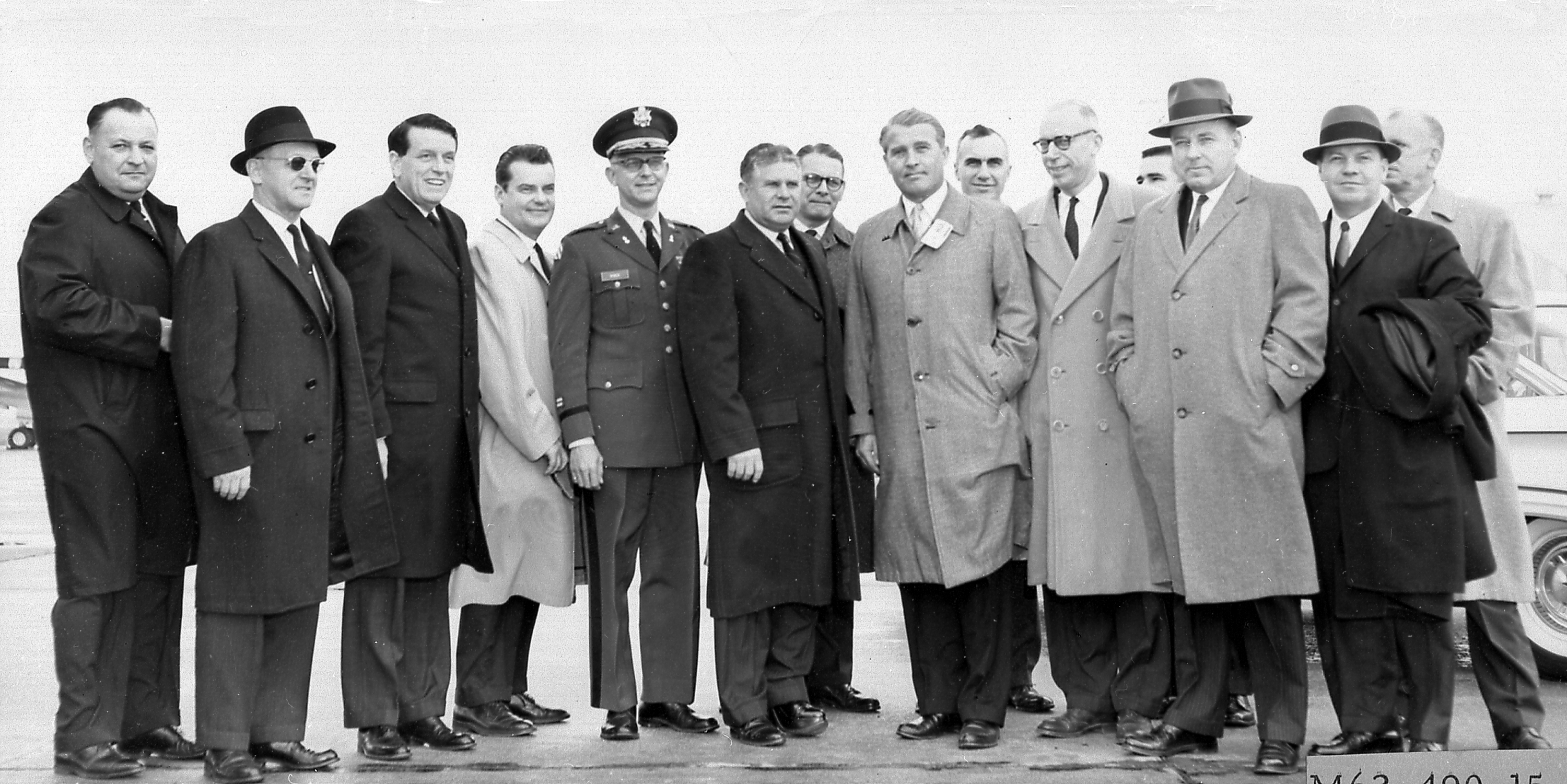
Riehlman and other House Committee on Science members visit Marshall Space Flight Center on March 9, 1962, to gather information on nation's space program.

In 1946 he was elected to Congress as a Republican, the ten-term Republican incumbent, in ill health, retiring. Unchallenged in the primary, he won 63% in November. He was reelected eight times and served from January 3, 1947, to January 3, 1965, the 80th through 88th Congresses. In 1952 Riehlman was one of the Republicans who visited Dwight D. Eisenhower, then commander of the North Atlantic Treaty Organization, to ask him to consider running for President. In his last term, Riehlman's seniority boosted him to the ranking Republican seat on the Government Operations Committee. As a member of the Committee on Science and Technology, he was an advocate of the U.S. space program. In nine terms he sponsored one successful public bill, addressing sales of surplus government property. Riehlman voted in favor of the Civil Rights Acts of 1957, 1960, and 1964, as well as the 24th Amendment to the U.S. Constitution.

== Post-Congressional career ==
Riehlman survived the 1958 election, which cost many Republican representatives their seats, but Barry Goldwater was too much for him. Unlike many New York Republicans, including Governor Nelson Rockefeller and both U.S. senators, Riehlman backed presidential candidate Goldwater and, as well, accepted the nomination of the new Conservative Party of New York State, which had been founded on opposition to Rockefeller. The result was a loss in the 1964 election, though by only two points. He then relocated to Ormond Beach, Florida and returned to the business world, serving as vice president of Lu-Mar Enterprises, a company which owned restaurants and owned and developed commercial real estate.

== Death and burial ==
He died in Ormond Beach, Florida on July 16, 1978. Riehlman was buried at Tully Cemetery in Tully.

U.S. House of Representatives
Preceded by Clarence E. Hancock	Member of the U.S. House of Representatives from New York's 36th congressional district 1947–1953	Succeeded by John Taber
Preceded by William R. Williams	Member of the U.S. House of Representatives from New York's 35th congressional district 1953–1963	Succeeded by Samuel S. Stratton
Preceded by Alexander Pirnie	Member of the U.S. House of Representatives from New York's 34th congressional district 1963–1965	Succeeded by James M. Hanley
