= Colin Soskolne =

Canadian epidemiologist and author

Colin L. Soskolne is a Canadian epidemiologist and author who was born, raised and educated in South Africa. He relocated to North America in 1977 to pursue his PhD studies in epidemiology at the University of Pennsylvania, Philadelphia. He was president of the Canadian Society for Epidemiology and Biostatistics.
