= Canadian Society for Epidemiology and Biostatistics =

Canadian scholarly society

The Canadian Society for Epidemiology and Biostatistics (CSEB), or Société Canadienne d'épidémiologie et de biostatistique (SCEB), was founded in 1990 to promote epidemiology and biostatistics research in Canada; encourage the use of epidemiologic data in formulating public health policy; increase the level of epidemiology and biostatistics funding available through federal, provincial, and private sources; facilitate communications among epidemiologists and biostatisticians; and assist faculty or schools of medicine and public health to improve training in epidemiology and biostatistics.

== Presidents ==
- 1991-1993 Nancy Kreiger
- 1993-1995 Jean Joly
- 1995-1997 Roy West
- 1997-1999 Nancy Mayo
- 1999-2001 Jack Siemiatycki
- 2001-2003 Rick Gallagher
- 2003-2007 Yang Mao
- 2007–2011 Colin Soskolne
- 2011–2013 Susan Jaglal
- 2013–2016 Thy Dinh
- 2016–2018 Mark Oremus
- 2018–2020 Laura Rosella
- 2020–2022 Mark Ferro
- 2022–2024 Eduardo Franco
- 2024–2026 Hilary Brown

== Collaborators and affiliates ==
CSEB bridges both the research and practice aspects of epidemiology and biostatistics through close collaboration with other groups such as the Public Health Agency of Canada (PHAC), Health Canada, the Association of Public Health Epidemiologists in Ontario (APHEO), the Saskatchewan Epidemiology Association (SEA), the Statistical Society of Canada (SSC), and the International Joint Policy Committee of the Societies of Epidemiology (IJPC-SE).
