= George C. Wortley =

American politician

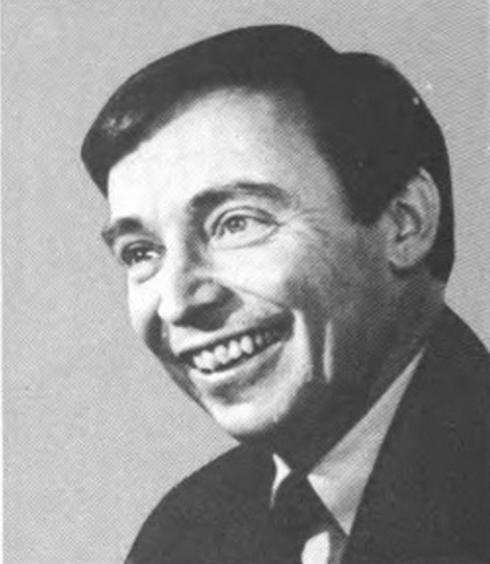

Member of the U.S. House of Representatives from New York
- In office January 3, 1981 – January 3, 1989
- Preceded by: James M. Hanley
- Succeeded by: James T. Walsh
- Constituency: 32nd district (1981–1983); 27th district (1983–1989)

Personal details
- Born: George Cornelius Wortley; December 8, 1926 Syracuse, New York, U.S.
- Died: January 21, 2014 (aged 87) Fort Lauderdale, Florida, U.S.
- Resting place: Congressional Cemetery
- Party: Republican
- Spouse: Barbara Wortley (died 2007) Anita Hansen Wortley (died 2014)
- Education: Syracuse University

George Cornelius Wortley (December 8, 1926 – January 21, 2014) was an American banker, publisher, and Republican member of the United States House of Representatives from New York, serving four terms from 1981 to 1989.

== Biography ==
Wortley was born in Syracuse, New York, and graduated from Syracuse University in 1948. Wortley was a brother of the Gamma-Iota chapter of Kappa Sigma fraternity.

Prior to his government service, he was president of the Manlius Publishing Corporation, a publisher of seven weekly newspapers in Upstate New York. He continued in that capacity until their sale in 1992. He was a member of the advisory board of the Bank of New York for five years and its successor, Norstar Bank. He has served on numerous civic, state and national boards and foundations. He also served on the board of Project ACTA, as well as the Kings Point's Government Affairs Council. His business and Congressional responsibilities took him to 35 nations.

He served in the Merchant Marine Reserve and the United States Naval Reserve during World War II, with sea duty in the North Atlantic, Pacific and Philippine theaters of operation.

=== Congress ===
He was elected to Congress in 1980 and served from January 3, 1981, until January 3, 1989, having been reelected to three terms including in 1986 running against Rosemary S. Pooler. He was the leading minority member of the House Banking, Finance and Urban Affairs Committee and was actively involved in working with European, Latin American and Pacific Rim leaders on financial and development bank matters. He also served on the House Ethics and Select Aging Committees.

He was instrumental in the development and passage of legislation enacting the first program to provide reverse mortgages to seniors.

=== Later career and death ===
He was a director of Dierman, Wortley & Zola, Inc. (DWZ), Morgan Casner Associates, political and public affairs consultants, and Washington Solutions, consultants on public policy and financial strategies. He also served on the advisory board of National Security Studies, a U.S. Department of Defense Executive Development program. He served as a senior policy advisor with The Carmen Group and the Financial Institutions Services Corp. (FISC).

Wortley died at a hospice in Fort Lauderdale, Florida, in 2014. He was 87. He was later buried at the Congressional Cemetery in Washington.

U.S. House of Representatives
Preceded by James M. Hanley	Member of the U.S. House of Representatives from New York's 32nd congressional district 1981–1983	Succeeded by John LaFalce
Preceded by Matthew F. McHugh	Member of the U.S. House of Representatives from New York's 27th congressional district 1983–1989	Succeeded by James T. Walsh
