= New York's 35th congressional district =

Former congressional district

Coordinates: 42°50′N 77°53′W

- Obsolete district
- Created: 1900
- Eliminated: 1980
- Years active: 1903–1983

New York's 35th congressional district was a congressional district for the United States House of Representatives in New York. It was created in 1903 as a result of the 1900 census. It was eliminated as a result of the redistricting cycle after the 1980 census. It was last represented by Barber B. Conable, Jr. who was redistricted into the 30th district.

== Past components ==
1973–1983:

All of Genesee, Livingston, Wyoming
Parts of Monroe, Ontario

1971–1973:

All of Chenango, Cortland, Madison
Parts of Onondaga

1963–1971:

All of Cayuga, Chenango, Cortland, Montgomery, Ontario, Otsego, Seneca, Yates

1953–1963:

All of Onondaga

1945–1953:

All of Oneida, Oswego

1913–1945:

All of Cortland, Onondaga

1903–1913:

Parts of Buffalo

== List of members representing the district ==
Representative	Party	Term	Cong ress	Note
District established March 4, 1903
William H. Ryan (Buffalo)	Democratic	March 4, 1903 – March 3, 1909	58th 59th 60th	Redistricted from 32nd district and re-elected in 1902. Re-elected in 1904. Re-elected in 1906. [data missing]
Daniel A. Driscoll (Buffalo)	Democratic	March 4, 1909 – March 3, 1913	61st 62nd	Elected in 1908. Re-elected in 1910. Redistricted to 42nd district
John R. Clancy (Syracuse)	Democratic	March 4, 1913 – March 3, 1915	63rd	Elected in 1912. [data missing]
Walter W. Magee (Syracuse)	Republican	March 4, 1915 – May 25, 1927	64th 65th 66th 67th 68th 69th 70th	Elected in 1914. Re-elected in 1916. Re-elected in 1918. Re-elected in 1920. Re-elected in 1922. Re-elected in 1924. Re-elected in 1926. Died.
Vacant		May 26, 1927 – November 7, 1927	70th	
Clarence E. Hancock (Syracuse)	Republican	November 8, 1927 – January 3, 1945	70th 71st 72nd 73rd 74th 75th 76th 77th 78th	Elected to finish Magee's term. Re-elected in 1928. Re-elected in 1930. Re-elected in 1932. Re-elected in 1934. Re-elected in 1936. Re-elected in 1938. Re-elected in 1940. Re-elected in 1942. Redistricted to 36th district
Hadwen C. Fuller (Parish)	Republican	January 3, 1945 – January 3, 1949	79th 80th	Redistricted from 32nd district and re-elected in 1944. Re-elected in 1946. [data missing]
John C. Davies (Utica)	Democratic	January 3, 1949 – January 3, 1951	81st	Elected in 1948. [data missing]
William R. Williams (Cassville)	Republican	January 3, 1951 – January 3, 1953	82nd	Re-elected in 1950. Redistricted to 34th district.
R. Walter Riehlman (Tully)	Republican	January 3, 1953 – January 3, 1963	83rd 84th 85th 86th 87th	Redistricted from 36th district and re-elected in 1952. Re-elected in 1954. Re-elected in 1956. Re-elected in 1958. Re-elected in 1960. Redistricted to 34th district.
Samuel S. Stratton (Amsterdam)	Democratic	January 3, 1963 – January 3, 1971	88th 89th 90th 91st	Redistricted from 32nd district and re-elected in 1962. Re-elected in 1964. Re-elected in 1966. Re-elected in 1968. Redistricted to 29th district.
James M. Hanley (Syracuse)	Democratic	January 3, 1971 – January 3, 1973	92nd	Redistricted from 34th district and re-elected in 1970. Redistricted to 32nd district.
Barber B. Conable Jr. (Alexander)	Republican	January 3, 1973 – January 3, 1983	93rd 94th 95th 96th 97th	Redistricted from 37th district and re-elected in 1972. Re-elected in 1974. Re-elected in 1976. Re-elected in 1978. Re-elected in 1980. Redistricted to 30th district.
District dissolved January 3, 1983

== Election results ==
The following chart shows historic election results. Bold type indicates victor. Italic type indicates incumbent.

Year	Democratic	Republican	Other
1980	John M. Owens: 44,754	**Barber B. Conable, Jr.**: 127,623	Bernard M. O'Connor (Right to Life): 3,772; Lydia Bayoneta (Workers World): 625
1978	Francis C. Repicci: 36,428	**Barber B. Conable, Jr.**: 96,119	Karen A. Hammel (Conservative): 6,046
1976	Michael Macaluso, Jr.: 67,177	**Barber B. Conable, Jr.**: 120,738	
1974	Margaret Costanza: 63,012	**Barber B. Conable, Jr.**: 90,269	Clarence E. Carman, Jr. (Conservative): 4,667; David L. MacAdam (Liberal): 1,110
1972	Terence J. Spencer: 53,321	**Barber B. Conable, Jr.**: 127,298	Terence C. Brennan (Conservative): 4,879; Alicia Burgos (Liberal): 2,082
1970	**James M. Hanley**: 82,425	John F. O'Connor: 76,381	
1968	**Samuel S. Stratton**: 112,640	George R. Metcalf: 47,849	William L. Griffen (Liberal): 1,870
1966	**Samuel S. Stratton**: 93,746	Frederick D. Dugan: 48,668	
1964	**Samuel S. Stratton**: 110,948	Robert M. Quigley: 62,463	
1962	**Samuel S. Stratton**: 78,560	Janet Hill Gordon: 65,697	
1960	Jerome M. Wilson: 87,347	**R. Walter Riehlman**: 105,241	Gerard J. Felter (Liberal): 3,144
1958	Caryl M. Kline: 77,449	**R. Walter Riehlman**: 90,285	
1956	Thomas J. Lowery: 59,534	**R. Walter Riehlman**: 124,108	Benjamin Copley (Liberal): 1,465
1954	James H. O'Connor: 51,358	**R. Walter Riehlman**: 90,002	Lillian Reiner (American Labor): 290
1952	Arthur B. McGuire: 65,763	**R. Walter Riehlman**: 113,778	Lillian Reiner (American Labor): 415
1950	John C. Davies: 54,284	William R. Williams: 60,657	Ross Maracchion (American Labor): 2,538
1948	John C. Davies: 62,855	Hadwen C. Fuller: 62,717	Max Meyers (American Labor): 2,964
1946	Frank A. Emma: 48,854	**Hadwen C. Fuller**: 58,040	
1944	Samuel H. Miller, Jr.: 60,025	Hadwen C. Fuller: 65,857	
1942	Arthur B. McGuire: 42,270	**Clarence E. Hancock**: 82,021	Fred Sander (American Labor): 2,934
1940	Flora D. Johnson: 69,730	**Clarence E. Hancock**: 97,688	Walter Soule (American Labor): 4,508
1938	Caleb C. Brown, Jr.: 50,083	**Clarence E. Hancock**: 90,078	Thomas P. Shallcross (Socialist): 409
1936	Arthur R. Perrin: 59,540	**Clarence E. Hancock**: 85,702	Robert H. Anderson (Your): 9,798; Samuel M. Wolfson (Socialist): 2,431; Lempi Makela (Communist): 229
1934	Richard P. Byrne: 50,599	**Clarence E. Hancock**: 65,732	Gustave A. Strebel (Socialist): 2,864; Lloyd Roberts (Law Preservation): 649; Sam Belkowitz (Communist): 237
1932	Edmund L. Weston: 60,376	**Clarence E. Hancock**: 79,345	Walter B. McNinch (Socialist): 2,950
1930	Frederick B. Northrup: 44,336	**Clarence E. Hancock**: 63,955	Henry Hotze (Socialist): 2,695
1928	Augustus C. Stevens: 52,926	**Clarence E. Hancock**: 90,370	Charles E. Wheelock (Socialist): 2,910
1926	Wilber M. Jones: 36,851	**Walter W. Magee**: 62,889	T. Deck Comerford (Socialist): 1,790
1924	John J. Kesel: 35,008	**Walter W. Magee**: 70,268	Frank Heck (Socialist): 3,394
1922	Frederick W. Thomson: 37,785	**Walter W. Magee**: 47,119	Fred Sander (Socialist): 2,124
1920	John F. Nash: 25,699	**Walter W. Magee**: 60,018	Fred Sander (Socialist): 4,508; Fannie F. Cochran (Prohibition): 2,087
