= Matthew F. McHugh =

American politician

Matt McHugh
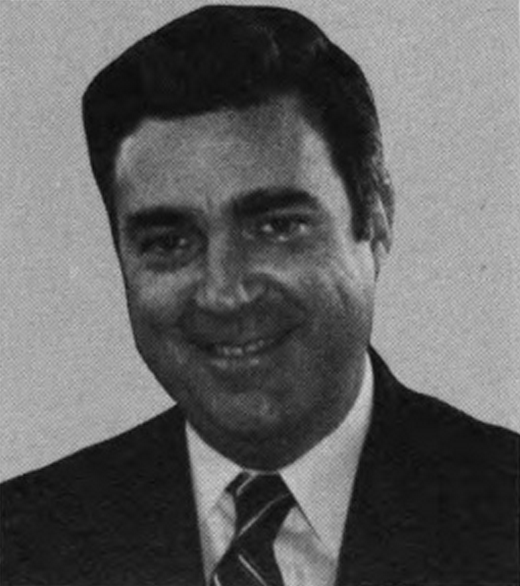

Member of the U.S. House of Representatives from New York
- In office January 3, 1975 – January 3, 1993
- Preceded by: Howard W. Robison
- Succeeded by: Maurice Hinchey (redistricted)
- Constituency: 27th district (1975–1983); 28th district (1983–1993)

District Attorney of Tompkins County
- In office 1969–1973
- Preceded by: Richard Thaler
- Succeeded by: Joseph Joch

Personal details
- Born: Matthew Francis McHugh; December 6, 1938 (age 87) Philadelphia, Pennsylvania, U.S.
- Party: Democratic
- Spouse: Eileen McHugh
- Children: 3
- Education: Mount St. Mary's University (BS); Villanova University (JD)

Matthew Francis "Matt" McHugh (born December 6, 1938) is an American lawyer and former Democratic member of the United States House of Representatives from New York, serving from 1975 to 1993.

== Biography ==
=== Early life and education ===
McHugh was born in Philadelphia, but spent most of his adult life in New York City. He attended Brooklyn Technical High School and Mount St. Mary's University, from which he earned a Bachelor of Science degree in 1960. He then attended the Villanova University School of Law, earning his Juris Doctor in 1963.

=== Political career ===
After several years of private practice in Ithaca, New York, he became the district attorney of Tompkins County from 1969 until 1973. For the next two years, he was a member of the state Democratic Committee.

McHugh was elected to the U.S. House in 1974, defeating his opponent, then-Binghamton Mayor Al Libous, a Republican, in the general election. McHugh won the 1974 election with 83,562 votes, while Libous placed second with 68,273 votes. He became the first Democrat to represent this district since 1915.

McHugh served in the House from January 3, 1975, until January 3, 1993. Although he was an avid civil rights supporter and member of the liberal wing of the Democratic Party, McHugh was known for his bipartisanship. McHugh was a member of the House Select Committee on Children, Youth, and Families during his final ten years in Congress. He had previously served on the Veterans' Affairs, Agricultural, and Interior Committees.

In 1992, McHugh chose not to run for reelection.

McHugh is currently a resident of Ashburn, Virginia. After retiring from the House, he originally worked as the vice president of Cornell University. He is employed by the World Bank. He also served on the board of directors of free-enterprise advisory services firm, FTI Consulting.

U.S. House of Representatives
Preceded by Howard W. Robison	Member of the U.S. House of Representatives from New York's 27th congressional district 1975–1983	Succeeded by George C. Wortley
Preceded by Samuel S. Stratton	Member of the U.S. House of Representatives from New York's 28th congressional district 1983–1993	Succeeded by Louise Slaughter
U.S. order of precedence (ceremonial)
Preceded by Thomas Downey as Former U.S. Representative	Order of precedence of the United States as Former U.S. Representative	Succeeded by Brian Higgins as Former U.S. Representative
