= James M. Hanley =

American politician

James Michael Hanley
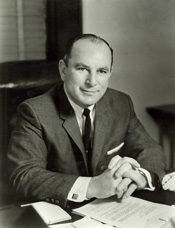

Member of the U.S. House of Representatives from New York
- In office January 3, 1965 – January 3, 1981
- Preceded by: R. Walter Riehlman
- Succeeded by: George C. Wortley
- Constituency: 34th district (1965–71); 35th district (1971–73); 32nd district (1973–81)

Personal details
- Born: July 19, 1920 Syracuse, New York, U.S.
- Died: October 16, 2003 (aged 83) Geddes, New York, U.S.
- Party: Democratic
- Spouse: Rita Ann Harrington (married 1950)
- Children: Peter; Christine
- Education: St. Lucy's Academy (Syracuse, New York)
- Occupation: Funeral Director

James Michael Hanley (July 19, 1920 – October 16, 2003) was an American businessman, World War II veteran, and politician who represented New York in the House of Representatives for eight terms from 1965 to 1981.

== Biography ==
James M. Hanley was born in Syracuse, New York, on July 19, 1920. He attended local schools and graduated from St. Lucy's Academy in 1938. He was a funeral director, and the owner and operator of the Callahan-Hanley-Mooney Funeral Home.

Hanley was a civic, religious, and fraternal activist, and among his activities and memberships were: the Syracuse-area chamber of commerce; American Legion; Knights of Columbus (grand knight); Elks; Syracuse-area Liederkranz; Hibernians; Boys Town; Army and Navy Union; Onondaga County Arc; Antique Automobile Club of America; Society of the Holy Name; Order of Alhambra; West End Social Club; St. Mary's Men's Club; honorary member of the Syracuse Police Benevolence Association; and the advisory board of Maria Regina College. In 1967, he received the honorary degree of LL.D. from Le Moyne College.

=== World War II ===
Hanley enlisted for World War II and served in the United States Army from 1942 to 1946.

=== Tenure in Congress ===
In 1964 he was a successful Democratic candidate for a Syracuse-based congressional district, the first Democrat to hold this seat since 1915. He served eight terms, 1965 to 1981, and was Chairman of the Committee on Post Office and Civil Service in his final term. During his Congressional career, Hanley was known as a liberal, and supported the Great Society program of Lyndon B. Johnson, expansion of Medicare and Head Start, and the Equal Rights Amendment.

=== Later career and death ===
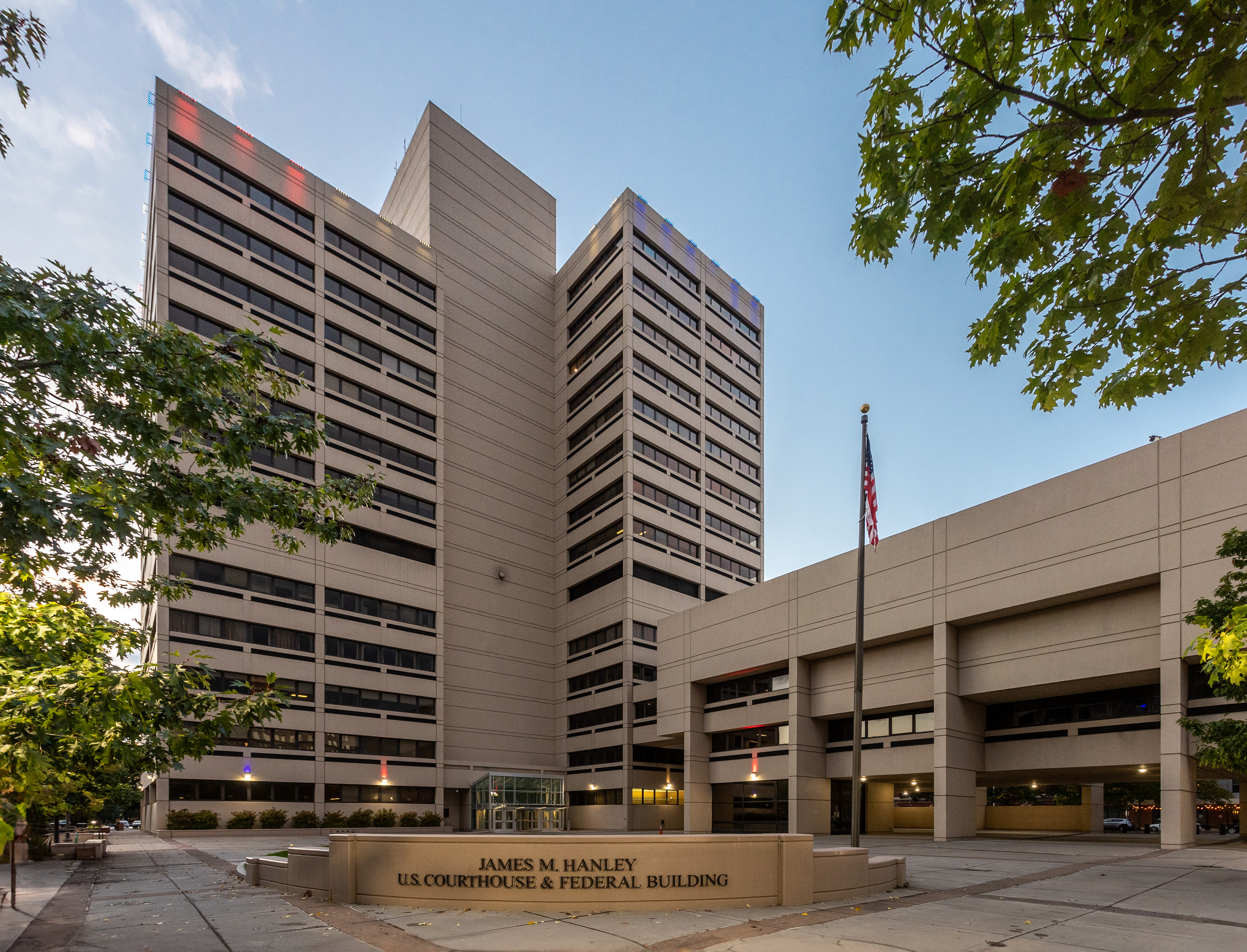
Hanley Federal Building in Syracuse

Hanley did not run for reelection in 1980; since then, no other Democrat has represented Syracuse in Congress for two consecutive terms. He worked as a government relations consultant in the Washington, D.C. area until 1990, afterwards retiring to upstate New York.

He died in Geddes, New York, on October 16, 2003, and was buried at the Onondaga County Veterans Memorial Cemetery.

=== Legacy ===
The federal building in Syracuse is named for him.

U.S. House of Representatives
Preceded by R. Walter Riehlman	Member of the U.S. House of Representatives from New York's 34th congressional district 1965–1971	Succeeded by John H. Terry
Preceded by Samuel S. Stratton	Member of the U.S. House of Representatives from New York's 35th congressional district 1971–1973	Succeeded by Barber B. Conable, Jr.
Preceded by Alexander Pirnie	Member of the U.S. House of Representatives from New York's 32nd congressional district 1973–1981	Succeeded by George C. Wortley
