= Samuel S. Stratton =

American politician (1916–1990)

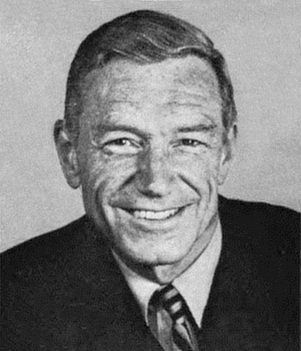
- Stratton in 1975

Member of the U.S. House of Representatives from New York
- In office January 3, 1959 – January 3, 1989
- Preceded by: Bernard W. Kearney
- Succeeded by: Michael McNulty
- Constituency: 32nd district (1959–63); 35th district (1963–71); 29th district (1971–73); 28th district (1973–83); 23rd district (1983–89)

Mayor of Schenectady, New York
- In office 1956–1959
- Preceded by: Archibald Wemple
- Succeeded by: Kenneth S. Sheldon

Personal details
- Born: September 27, 1916 Yonkers, New York, U.S.
- Died: September 13, 1990 (aged 73) Gaithersburg, Maryland, U.S.
- Resting place: Arlington National Cemetery
- Party: Democratic
- Spouse: Joan Harris (m. 1947–1990)
- Children: 5; including Brian
- Education: University of Rochester; Haverford College; Harvard University

Military service
- Allegiance: United States of America
- Branch/service: United States Navy
- Years of service: 1942–1946, 1951–1953 (Navy); 1946–1951, 1953–1976 (Navy Reserve)
- Rank: Captain
- Unit: Office of Naval Intelligence
- Battles/wars: World War II; Korean War
- Awards: Bronze Star Medal (2)

Samuel Studdiford Stratton (September 27, 1916 – September 13, 1990) was an American politician who was a member of the Democratic Party. He is notable for his service as mayor of Schenectady, and his 30-year career as a member of the United States House of Representatives from New York. He also served in the United States Navy during both World War II and the Korean War.

== Early life ==
Stratton was born in Yonkers, New York, the son of the Reverend Paul Stratton (1876–1942) and Ethel Irene Russell (1883–1970). His family moved to Schenectady, New York while he was an infant. He attended school in Schenectady, Rochester, and at Blair Academy in New Jersey. He received a Bachelor of Arts degree from the University of Rochester in 1937, was a captain of the swim team, and joined Phi Beta Kappa and Psi Upsilon. He received a Master of Arts degree in Philosophy from Haverford College in 1938, and a Master of Arts in Philosophy from Harvard University in 1940. Stratton was executive secretary to Massachusetts Congressman Thomas H. Eliot from 1940 to 1942.

== Military ==
In mid-1942, Stratton joined the United States Naval Reserve. Commissioned an ensign, he studied the Japanese language at the University of Colorado Boulder, where many of the instructors were Americans of Japanese descent who had relocated from California during the World War II Internment of Japanese Americans. (Note: Stratton was also fluent in German.) As one of the "Boulder Boys" naval intelligence officers who had studied in Colorado, he served in the South West Pacific Area during the war as a member of General Douglas MacArthur's staff. Twice awarded the Bronze Star Medal with Valor device, Stratton's service was notable for his interrogation of Tomoyuki Yamashita, who was later executed for his part in the Manila massacre. According to a story Stratton detailed in a 1954 journal article, when interrogating Yamashita, he did not use the formal Japanese phrasing normally employed for addressing someone of high stature. When Yamashita's chief of staff, Akira Mutō, objected to the breach of decorum, Yamashita told Mutō it did not matter because Stratton's Japanese was fluent, and that as prisoners of war they had no expectation of formal treatment.

During the Korean War, Stratton was recalled to active duty, serving as an instructor at the Naval Intelligence School in Washington, D.C. from 1951 to 1953. He attained the rank of commander in 1955, and retired as a captain in 1976.

== Schenectady politics ==
After World War II, Stratton returned to Schenectady and was elected to the city council in 1949. He began serving as a member of Schenectady's Municipal Housing Authority in 1950, and remained with the Authority until 1955, including holding the position of chairman in 1951.

Following his Korean War service, Stratton returned to Schenectady and was re-elected to the city council, where he served from 1953 to 1956. In 1955, he was elected mayor of Schenectady Democrat. For a period of time while he was mayor, he supplemented his salary by working as an on-air announcer, newscaster, and commentator on politics and current events for WRGB, the NBC television affiliate in Schenectady, as well as other local television and radio stations. His television career included appearances as the children's character Sagebrush Sam, which required dressing as a cowboy and playing a harmonica. From 1957 to 1958, Stratton was also a financial services representative with the First Albany Corporation.

== Congressional career ==
In 1958, Stratton was elected to the U.S. Congress. He rose through seniority to become the third-ranking Democrat on the Armed Services Committee; though he lost a race for chairman of the committee to Les Aspin in 1985, he chaired subcommittees including the one on Procurement and Military Nuclear Systems, and was recognized as an expert on defense issues. Stratton consistently succeeded at winning reelection by appealing to hawkish Cold War era voters and supporting defense spending in his district, which included General Electric manufacturing plants and the Watervliet Arsenal.

For his first two terms, Stratton represented a relatively compact district centered around Schenectady. In the early 1960s, the Republican-controlled legislature tried to defeat him through unfavorable redistricting. Stratton moved to Amsterdam, which was part of a district that snaked from the Capital District suburbs all the way west across Upstate as far as Auburn, including some of the most rural and conservative territory in central New York. On paper, this district seemed unwinnable for a Democrat, even a hawkish Democrat like Stratton, but he was reelected in 1962 with 54 percent of the vote. He quickly became popular with the voters in this mostly rural district, and went on to win another four terms by well over 60 percent of the vote. The state legislature gave up in the 1970s round of redistricting, and placed Stratton's home into a heavily Democratic seat including the heart of the Capital District. He easily defeated Republican incumbent Daniel Button, and was reelected seven more times without serious difficulty until retiring in 1989 at the age of 72.

In 1962, Stratton was a candidate for Governor of New York; Robert M. Morgenthau won the Democratic nomination, but lost the general election to incumbent Nelson A. Rockefeller. Stratton was a candidate for the Democratic nomination for the United States Senate in 1964, hoping to challenge incumbent Kenneth Keating, but he was defeated by Robert F. Kennedy, who went on to win the election.

Despite his Cold War hawkishness, Stratton was liberal on other issues. He was a proponent of the Equal Rights Amendment, and also introduced successful legislation, the Stratton Amendment, as a rider to the 1975 defense appropriations bill, which mandated the admission of women to the service academies.

On foreign policy, Stratton's Cold War anti-communism was reflected in his pursuit of improved training and equipping of the National Guard and Reserve and tank and aircraft modernization. In addition, he advocated maintaining a US troop presence in South Korea, a strengthening of the ANZUS alliance, and improvements to the NATO alliance. On defense policy, Stratton led efforts to improve military pay and benefits, resolve the issue of the navy's title for the O-7 rank (rear admiral (lower half)), and investigate the Vietnam War's My Lai massacre. He also advocated expansion of the Naval Petroleum Reserve and creation of the Uniformed Services University of the Health Sciences.

In 1976, Stratton led an unsuccessful effort to cite journalist Daniel Schorr for Contempt of Congress after Schorr refused to identify his source for a copy of the Pike Committee report on the clandestine activities of the Central Intelligence Agency. Schorr had provided the report to The Village Voice, which made its contents public.

== Retirement ==
In 1988, Stratton announced his bid for reelection, and circulated nominating petitions to appear as a candidate for renomination in the Democratic primary. On the last day that he was eligible to withdraw, Stratton announced his retirement. This move gave his committee on vacancies—three party leaders named on his nominating petition—the ability to name a replacement. The committee selected Michael R. McNulty, then serving in the New York State Assembly. Stratton said he was retiring because of health concerns (he was being treated for both asthma and gout), but the obvious implication raised by his political opponents was that he had intended to retire all along, and wanted to make it easier for McNulty to succeed him. Despite this minor controversy, McNulty obtained the Democratic nomination unopposed and went on to easily win the general election; Stratton retired at the end of his final term in January 1989.

== Death and burial ==
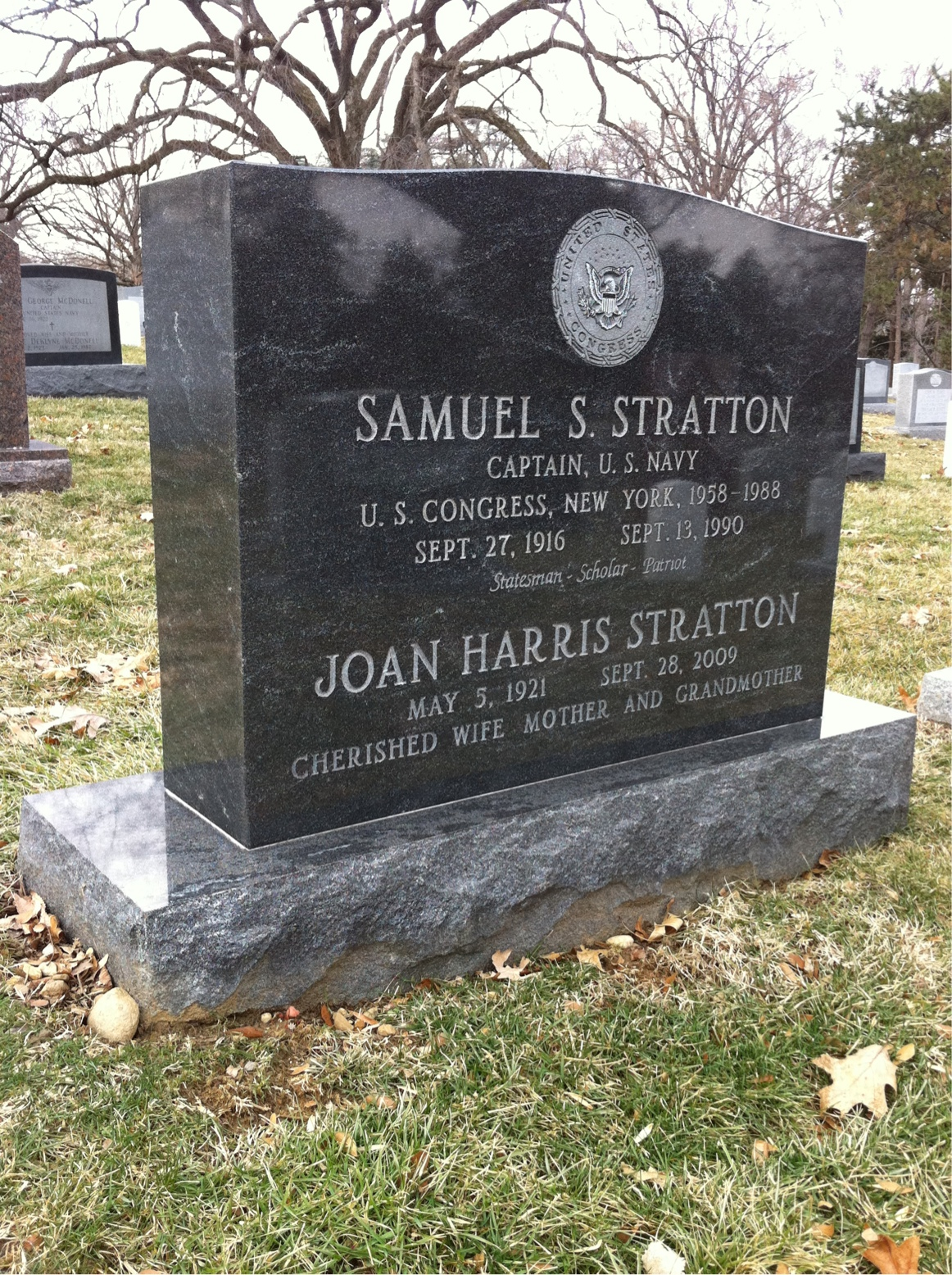
Grave at Arlington National Cemetery

After retiring, Stratton lived in Bethesda, Maryland. He had a stroke in October 1989, after which he resided in a Potomac, Maryland nursing home. Stratton died in Gaithersburg, Maryland on September 13, 1990, and was buried at Arlington National Cemetery, Section 7A, Grave 58.

== Legacy ==
After Stratton's death, both the Air National Guard base in Scotia, New York and the Veterans Affairs hospital in Albany, New York were named in his honor.

== In popular culture ==
The 1998 film The Pentagon Wars includes a scene in which Secretary of Defense Caspar Weinberger fields a phone call from an unseen and unheard Stratton about the procurement of the Bradley Fighting Vehicle. After deflecting Stratton's concerns, Weinberger directs his subordinates to complete their investigation of the Bradley's field testing quickly and brief him on the results so he will not be surprised by more calls from members of Congress.

== Family ==
In 1947, Stratton was married to Joan Harris (1921–2009). They were the parents of five children: daughters Lisa, Debra, and Kim; and sons Kevin and Brian.

Brian Stratton was elected mayor of Schenectady in 2003. With the expected retirement of the elder Stratton's successor in Congress, Michael McNulty, there was speculation that Brian would run for his father's old House seat in the 2008 election, but he chose to remain mayor, and later accepted an appointment as director of the New York State Canal Corporation.

== See also ==
- New York's congressional delegations

== Sources ==
=== Newspapers ===
- "Stratton Gets Navy Promotion". The Times Record. Troy, NY. July 23, 1955 – via Newspapers.com.
- "Schorr Might Face Charges On CIA Report". The San Francisco Examiner. San Francisco, CA. Examiner News Service. February 15, 1976 – via Newspapers.com.
- "Stratton Foes Ask Schorr Write-In". Binghamton Press. Binghamton, NY. Associated Press. October 29, 1976 – via Newspapers.com.
- "Rep. Stratton Won't Seek 16th Term; Health Cited". Ithaca Journal. Ithaca, NY. Associated Press. July 19, 1988 – via Newspapers.com.
- Coy, Peter (September 5, 1982). "Dow, Stratton a Race of Opposites". The Journal-News. White Plains, NY. Associated Press.
- Lamendola, Michael (February 12, 2008). "Mayor Would Rather Stay in Schenectady". Schenectady Gazette. Schenectady, NY.
- McQuiston, John T. (September 14, 1990). "Samuel S. Stratton, 73, Former Congressman, Dies". New York Times. New York, NY.
- "DioGuardi Trails In Tight Westchester Race". The Journal News. White Plains, NY. Associated Press. November 9, 1988 – via Newspapers.com.
- Pearson, Richard (September 15, 1990). "Obituaries: Samuel S. Stratton". Washington Post. Washington, DC.
- Van Fleet, Robert (September 2, 1964). "Kennedy Wins, Jabs at Keating: Stratton Asks Demo Unity". The Oneonta Star. Oneonta, NY. Ottaway News Service – via Newspapers.com.

=== Internet ===
- "Obituary, Joan Harris Stratton". Schenectady, NY: Schenectady Gazette. September 30, 2009.
- "109th Airlift Wing: History". 109aw.ang.af.mil/. Scotia, NY: New York Air National Guard.
- "Locations: Albany VA Medical Center: Samuel S. Stratton". www.va.gov/. Washington, DC: US Department of Veterans Affairs.
- "Samuel S. Stratton at Arlington Cemetery.mil". Arlington Cemetery.mil. Washington, DC: US Department of the Army.
- "Greater Voter Perception Stimulates New Election Patterns". library.cqpress.com/. Washington, DC: CQ Almanac 1962. 1962.
- Estelle, William. "History: Admission of Female Cadets". History: Class of '75. US Air Force Academy Class of 1975.
- Karlin, Rick (October 26, 2007). "McNulty won't run again: 10-term congressman plans announcement; move creates wide-open race for seat". Albanyweblog.com. Albany, NY: Lynne Jackson, Jackson's Computer Services. Albany Times Union.

=== Books ===
- Cross, Wilbur (1964). Samuel S. Stratton: A Story of Political Gumption. J.H. Heineman: New York, NY. pp. 26, 42.
- New York Red Book. Menands, NY: Williams Press. 1963. p. 1047.
- Monmonier, Mark (2001). Bushmanders and Bullwinkles: How Politicians Manipulate Electronic Maps and Census Data to Win Elections. Chicago, IL: University of Chicago Press. pp. 90–95. ISBN 978-0-226-53424-4.
- US House of Representatives Committee on Armed Services (October 5, 1988). "Resolution for the Honorable Samuel S. Stratton". Full Committee Consideration of Resolutions Honoring Hon. Samuel S. Stratton of New York and Robert E. Badham of California. Washington, DC: US Government Printing Office. p. 14 – via Google Books.
- US House of Representatives Committee on the Judiciary (1986). Hearings On the Civil Liberties Act of 1985 and the Aleutian and Pribilof Islands Restitution Act. Washington, DC: US Government Printing Office – via Google Books.

=== Magazines ===
- Osborne, Frederick S. (November 20, 1942). "Obituary: Paul Stratton, '03". Princeton Alumni Weekly. Princeton, NJ: Princeton University Press. p. 19.
- Stratton, Samuel S. (February 1954). "Tiger Of Malaya". Proceedings. Annapolis, Maryland: United States Naval Institute.

Political offices
Preceded by Archibald Wemple	Mayor of Schenectady, New York; 1956–1959	Succeeded by Kenneth S. Sheldon
U.S. House of Representatives
Preceded by Bernard W. Kearney	Member of the U.S. House of Representatives from New York's 32nd congressional district 1959–1963	Succeeded by Alexander Pirnie
Preceded by R. Walter Riehlman	Member of the U.S. House of Representatives from New York's 35th congressional district 1963–1971	Succeeded by James M. Hanley
Preceded by Daniel E. Button	Member of the U.S. House of Representatives from New York's 29th congressional district 1971–1973	Succeeded by Carleton J. King
Preceded by Hamilton Fish IV	Member of the U.S. House of Representatives from New York's 28th congressional district 1973–1983	Succeeded by Matthew F. McHugh
Preceded by Peter A. Peyser	Member of the U.S. House of Representatives from New York's 23rd congressional district 1983–1989	Succeeded by Michael R. McNulty
