= New York's 32nd congressional district =

Historic congressional district in the United States

Coordinates: 43°11′N 78°28′W

- Obsolete district
- Created: 1830; 1870
- Eliminated: 1860; 1990
- Years active: 1833–1863; 1873–1993

New York's 32nd congressional district was a congressional district for the United States House of Representatives in New York. It was eliminated as a result of the 1990 census. It was last represented by John LaFalce who was redistricted into the 29th district.

== Past components ==
New York's 32nd Congressional District was first formed in 1832. The district was abolished in 1862.

It was reestablished in 1872 and then consisted of Chautauqua County, New York and Cattaraugus County, New York. In 1874, the congressional districts of New York were redrawn and the 32nd district was moved to Erie County, the location of Buffalo, New York. With 178,699 residents it was the most populous district in New York, with its closest competitor being the 153,000 population of the 1st district on Long Island.

When district boundaries were again redrawn in 1885, the 32nd district was reduced to just covering Buffalo.

By 1892 even just Buffalo was too populous for a single district, and the city was split, with the southern portion being put in the 32nd district.

In the 1902 redistricting the 32nd district was moved to Monroe County, which is dominated by the city of Rochester.

1913–1945:

All of Jefferson, Lewis, Madison, Oswego

1945–1953:

All of Albany
Parts of Rensselaer

1953–1963:

All of Fulton, Hamilton, Montgomery, Otsego, Schenectady

1963–1971:

All of Herkimer, Madison, Oneida

1971–1973:

All of Fulton, Hamilton, Herkimer, Lewis, Oneida

1973–1983:

All of Chenango, Cortland, Madison
Parts of Delaware, Onondaga, Otsego

1983–1993:

All of Niagara, Orleans
Parts of Erie, Monroe

== List of members representing the district ==
Member	Party	Years	Cong ress	Electoral history
District established March 4, 1833
Millard Fillmore (Buffalo)	Whig	March 4, 1833 – March 3, 1835	23rd	Elected in 1832. [data missing]
Thomas C. Love (Buffalo)	Anti-Jacksonian	March 4, 1835 – March 3, 1837	24th	Elected in 1834. [data missing]
Millard Fillmore (Buffalo)	Whig	March 4, 1837 – March 3, 1843	25th 26th 27th	Elected in 1836. Re-elected in 1838. Re-elected in 1840. [data missing]
William A. Moseley (Buffalo)	Whig	March 4, 1843 – March 3, 1847	28th 29th	Elected in 1842. Re-elected in 1844. [data missing]
Nathan K. Hall (Buffalo)	Whig	March 4, 1847 – March 3, 1849	30th	Elected in 1846. [data missing]
Elbridge G. Spaulding (Buffalo)	Whig	March 4, 1849 – March 3, 1851	31st	Elected in 1848. [data missing]
Solomon G. Haven (Buffalo)	Whig	March 4, 1851 – March 3, 1855	32nd 33rd 34th	Elected in 1850. Re-elected in 1852. Re-elected in 1854. [data missing]
Solomon G. Haven (Buffalo)	Opposition	March 4, 1855 – March 3, 1857	32nd 33rd 34th	Elected in 1850. Re-elected in 1852. Re-elected in 1854. [data missing]
Israel T. Hatch (Buffalo)	Democratic	March 4, 1857 – March 3, 1859	35th	Elected in 1856. [data missing]
Elbridge G. Spaulding (Buffalo)	Republican	March 4, 1859 – March 3, 1863	36th 37th	Elected in 1858. Re-elected in 1860. [data missing]
District dissolved March 4, 1863
District re-established March 4, 1873
Walter L. Sessions (Panama)	Republican	March 4, 1873 – March 3, 1875	43rd	Redistricted from the 31st district and re-elected in 1872. [data missing]
Lyman K. Bass (Buffalo)	Republican	March 4, 1875 – March 3, 1877	44th	Redistricted from the 31st district and re-elected in 1874.. [data missing]
Daniel N. Lockwood (Buffalo)	Democratic	March 4, 1877 – March 3, 1879	45th	Elected in 1876. [data missing]
Ray V. Pierce (Buffalo)	Republican	March 4, 1879 – September 18, 1880	46th	Elected in 1878. Resigned.
Vacant		September 19, 1880 – November 11, 1880	46th	
Jonathan Scoville (Buffalo)	Democratic	November 12, 1880 – March 3, 1883	46th 47th	Elected to finish Pierce's term and seated December 6, 1880. Re-elected in 1880.[data missing]
William F. Rogers (Buffalo)	Democratic	March 4, 1883 – March 3, 1885	48th	Elected in 1882. [data missing]
John M. Farquhar (Buffalo)	Republican	March 4, 1885 – March 3, 1891	49th 50th 51st	Elected in 1884. Re-elected in 1886. Re-elected in 1888. [data missing]
Daniel N. Lockwood (Buffalo)	Democratic	March 4, 1891 – March 3, 1895	52nd 53rd	Elected in 1890. Re-elected in 1892. [data missing]
Rowland B. Mahany (Buffalo)	Republican	March 4, 1895 – March 3, 1899	54th 55th	Elected in 1894. Re-elected in 1896. [data missing]
William H. Ryan (Buffalo)	Democratic	March 4, 1899 – March 3, 1903	56th 57th	Elected in 1898. Re-elected in 1900. Redistricted to the 35th district.
James B. Perkins (Rochester)	Republican	March 4, 1903 – March 11, 1910	58th 59th 60th 61st	Redistricted from the 31st district and re-elected in 1902. Re-elected in 1904. Re-elected in 1906. Re-elected in 1908. Died.
Vacant		March 12, 1910 – April 18, 1910	61st	
James S. Havens (Rochester)	Democratic	April 19, 1910 – March 3, 1911	61st	Elected to finish Perkins's term [data missing]
Henry G. Danforth (Rochester)	Republican	March 4, 1911 – March 3, 1913	62nd	Elected in 1910. Redistricted to the 39th district.
Luther W. Mott (Oswego)	Republican	March 4, 1913 – July 10, 1923	63rd 64th 65th 66th 67th 68th	Redistricted from the 28th district and re-elected in 1912. Re-elected in 1914. Re-elected in 1916. Re-elected in 1918. Re-elected in 1920. Re-elected in 1922. Died.
Vacant		July 11, 1923 – November 5, 1923	68th	
Thaddeus C. Sweet (Phoenix)	Republican	November 6, 1923 – May 1, 1928	68th 69th 70th	Elected to finish Mott's term. Re-elected in 1924. Re-elected in 1926. Died.
Vacant		May 2, 1928 – November 5, 1928	70th	
Francis D. Culkin (Oswego)	Republican	November 6, 1928 – August 4, 1943	70th 71st 72nd 73rd 74th 75th 76th 77th 78th	Elected to finish Sweet's term. Re-elected in 1928. Re-elected in 1930. Re-elected in 1932. Re-elected in 1934. Re-elected in 1936. Re-elected in 1938. Re-elected in 1940. Re-elected in 1942. Died.
Vacant		August 5, 1943 – November 1, 1943	78th	
Hadwen C. Fuller (Parish)	Republican	November 2, 1943 – January 3, 1945	78th	Elected to finish Culkin's term. Redistricted to the 35th district.
William T. Byrne (Loudonville)	Democratic	January 3, 1945 – January 27, 1952	79th 80th 81st 82nd	Redistricted from the 28th district and re-elected in 1944. Re-elected in 1946. Re-elected in 1948. Re-elected in 1950. Died.
Vacant		January 28, 1952 – March 31, 1952	82nd	
Leo W. O'Brien (Albany)	Democratic	April 1, 1952 – January 3, 1953	82nd	Elected to finish Byrne's term. Redistricted to the 30th district.
Bernard W. Kearney (Lake Pleasant)	Republican	January 3, 1953 – January 3, 1959	83rd 84th 85th	Redistricted from the 31st district and re-elected in 1952. Re-elected in 1954. Re-elected in 1956. [data missing]
Samuel S. Stratton (Schenectady)	Democratic	January 3, 1959 – January 3, 1963	86th 87th	Elected in 1958. Re-elected in 1960. Redistricted to the 35th district.
Alexander Pirnie (Utica)	Republican	January 3, 1963 – January 3, 1973	88th 89th 90th 91st 92nd	Redistricted from the 34th district and re-elected in 1962. Re-elected in 1964. Re-elected in 1966. Re-elected in 1968. Re-elected in 1970. Redistricted to the 31st district and retired.
James M. Hanley (Syracuse)	Democratic	January 3, 1973 – January 3, 1981	93rd 94th 95th 96th	Redistricted from the 35th district and re-elected in 1972. Re-elected in 1974. Re-elected in 1976. Re-elected in 1978. Retired
George C. Wortley (Fayetteville)	Republican	January 3, 1981 – January 3, 1983	97th	Elected in 1980. Redistricted to the 27th district.
John LaFalce (Tonawanda)	Democratic	January 3, 1983 – January 3, 1993	98th 99th 100th 101st 102nd	Redistricted from the 36th district and re-elected in 1982. Re-elected in 1984. Re-elected in 1986. Re-elected in 1988. Re-elected in 1990. Redistricted to the 29th district.
District dissolved January 3, 1993

== Election results ==
The following chart shows historic election results. Bold type indicates victor. Italic type indicates incumbent.

Year	Democratic	Republican	Other
1920	Newton S. Beebe: 20,085	**Luther W. Mott** (Incumbent): 53,249	
1922	M. J. Daley: 22,279	**Luther W. Mott** (Incumbent): 44,091	John Seitz (Socialist): 1,039; James Corbett (Farmer-Labor): 308
1924	Charles R. Lee: 23,715	**Thaddeus C. Sweet**: 52,506	
1926	John M. Reynolds: 21,007	**Thaddeus C. Sweet** (Incumbent): 46,232	Thomas H. Lynch (Socialist): 900
1928	Frank Browman: 30,201	Francis D. Culkin: 65,009	James A. Manson (Socialist): 1,159
1930	Walter W. Wilcox: 20,905	**Francis D. Culkin** (Incumbent): 43,625	James A. Manson (Socialist): 1,000
1932	John C. Purcell: 34,199	**Francis D. Culkin** (Incumbent): 56,654	James A. Manson (Socialist): 751
1934	Annie D. Mills: 22,959	**Francis D. Culkin** (Incumbent): 49,055	George Arnold (Socialist): 1,237
1936	Paul J. Woodard: 32,318	**Francis D. Culkin** (Incumbent): 65,761	Orley N. Tooley (Socialist): 1,389
1938	Virginia A. Spencer: 19,631	**Francis D. Culkin** (Incumbent): 60,947	Orley N. Tooley (Socialist): 191
1940	Frank M. McCormack: 30,105	**Francis D. Culkin** (Incumbent): 71,782	Clarence Stuber (American Labor): 2,483
1942	Vanche F. Milligan: 17,631	**Francis D. Culkin** (Incumbent): 50,970	Raymond K. Bull (American Labor): 1,064
1944	**William T. Byrne**: 85,147	Miles A. McGrane, Jr.: 63,603	
1946	**William T. Byrne** (Incumbent): 79,042	William K. Sanford: 64,325	
1948	**William T. Byrne** (Incumbent): 88,476	Lawrence J. Collins: 65,341	Margaret L. Wheeler (American Labor): 5,354
1950	**William T. Byrne** (Incumbent): 90,420	John T. Casey: 60,087	Janet Scott (American Labor): 3,261
1952	David C. Prince: 50,307	**Bernard W. Kearney**: 111,025	Herbert M. Merrill (Liberal): 3,504
1954	David C. Prince: 48,808	**Bernard W. Kearney** (Incumbent): 77,891	
1956	R. Joseph Giblin: 52,064	**Bernard W. Kearney** (Incumbent): 107,959	
1958	Samuel S. Stratton: 73,384	Walter C. Shaw: 62,443	
1960	**Samuel S. Stratton** (Incumbent): 98,990	W. Clyde Wright: 59,890	
1962	Virgil C. Crisafulli: 57,414	**Alexander Pirnie**: 77,875	
1964	Robert Castle: 75,660	**Alexander Pirnie** (Incumbent): 86,717	
1966	Robert Castle: 36,195	**Alexander Pirnie** (Incumbent): 94,331	
1968	Anthony J. Montoya: 43,254	**Alexander Pirnie** (Incumbent): 95,793	Albert J. Bushong (Conservative): 10,393
1970	Joseph Simmons: 47,306	**Alexander Pirnie** (Incumbent): 90,884	
1972	**James M. Hanley**: 111,481	Leonard C. Koldin: 83,451	
1974	**James M. Hanley** (Incumbent): 88,660	William E. Bush: 61,379	
1976	**James M. Hanley** (Incumbent): 101,419	George C. Wortley: 81,597	Earl W. Colvin (Liberal): 2,124
1978	**James M. Hanley** (Incumbent): 76,251	Peter Del Giorno: 67,071	Lillian E. Reiner (Liberal): 2,149
1980	Jeffrey S. Brooks: 56,535	**George C. Wortley** (Incumbent): 108,128	Peter Del Giorno (Right to Life): 11,978; James Northrup (Libertarian): 2,316
1982	**John J. LaFalce**: 116,386		Raymond R. Walker (Conservative): 8,638; Timothy J. Hubbard (Right to Life): 2,359
1984	**John J. LaFalce** (Incumbent): 139,979	Anthony J. Murty: 61,797	
1986	**John J. LaFalce** (Incumbent): 99,745		Dean L. Walker (Conservative): 6,234; Anthony J. Murty (Right to Life): 3,678
1988	**John J. LaFalce** (Incumbent): 133,917	Emil K. Everett: 50,299	
1990	**John J. LaFalce** (Incumbent): 68,367	Michael T. Waring: 39,053	Kenneth J. Kowalski (Conservative): 16,853
