= Barber Conable =

American politician (1922–2003)

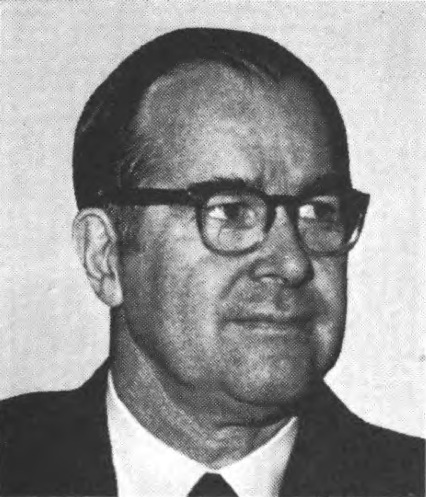

President of the World Bank Group
- In office July 1, 1986 – August 31, 1991
- Preceded by: Tom Clausen
- Succeeded by: Lewis Preston

Chair of the House Republican Policy Committee
- In office December 14, 1973 – January 3, 1977
- Leader: John Jacob Rhodes
- Preceded by: John Jacob Rhodes
- Succeeded by: Del M. Clawson

Chair of the House Republican Research Committee
- In office January 3, 1971 – December 14, 1973
- Leader: Gerald Ford
- Preceded by: Robert Taft Jr.
- Succeeded by: Lou Frey

Member of the U.S. House of Representatives from New York
- In office January 3, 1965 – January 3, 1985
- Preceded by: Harold Ostertag
- Succeeded by: Fred Eckert
- Constituency: 37th district (1965–1973); 35th district (1973–1983); 30th district (1983–1985)

Member of the New York Senate from the 53rd district
- In office January 1, 1963 – December 31, 1964
- Preceded by: Austin Erwin
- Succeeded by: Kenneth Willard

Personal details
- Born: Barber Benjamin Conable Jr. November 2, 1922 Warsaw, New York, U.S.
- Died: November 30, 2003 (aged 81) Sarasota, Florida, U.S.
- Party: Republican
- Spouse: Charlotte Williams
- Education: Cornell University (BA, LLB)

Barber Benjamin Conable Jr. (November 2, 1922 – November 30, 2003) was a U.S. congressman from New York and former president of the World Bank Group.

== Biography ==
Conable was born in Warsaw, New York on November 2, 1922. Conable was an Eagle Scout and received the Distinguished Eagle Scout Award from the Boy Scouts of America. He graduated from Cornell University in 1942, where he was president of the Quill and Dagger society and a member of the Phi Delta Theta fraternity. He then enlisted in the Marines and was sent to the Pacific front in World War II, where he learned to speak Japanese and fought in the Battle of Iwo Jima. After the war, he received his law degree from Cornell University Law School in 1948, where he lived at the Cornell Branch of the Telluride Association, having been admitted to the House as a law student, after an unsuccessful attempt as an undergraduate. He later re-enlisted and fought in the Korean War.

In 1952, Conable married Charlotte Williams, his wife until his death. He died from a staphylococcus infection in 2003, at his winter home in Sarasota, Florida.

== Legislative career ==
In 1962, Conable was elected as a Republican to the New York State Senate. After serving one term in the New York State Senate, he was elected to the U.S. House of Representatives in 1964 from a Rochester-based district. He was reelected nine more times. He was known on both sides of the aisle for his honesty and integrity, at one point being voted by his colleagues the "most respected" member of Congress; he refused to accept personal contributions larger than $50. As a longtime ranking member of the House Ways and Means Committee, one of his signal legislative achievements was a provision in the U.S. tax code that made so-called 401(k) and 403(b) defined-contribution retirement plans possible, and contributions to those plans by both employers and employees tax-deferred, under federal tax law.

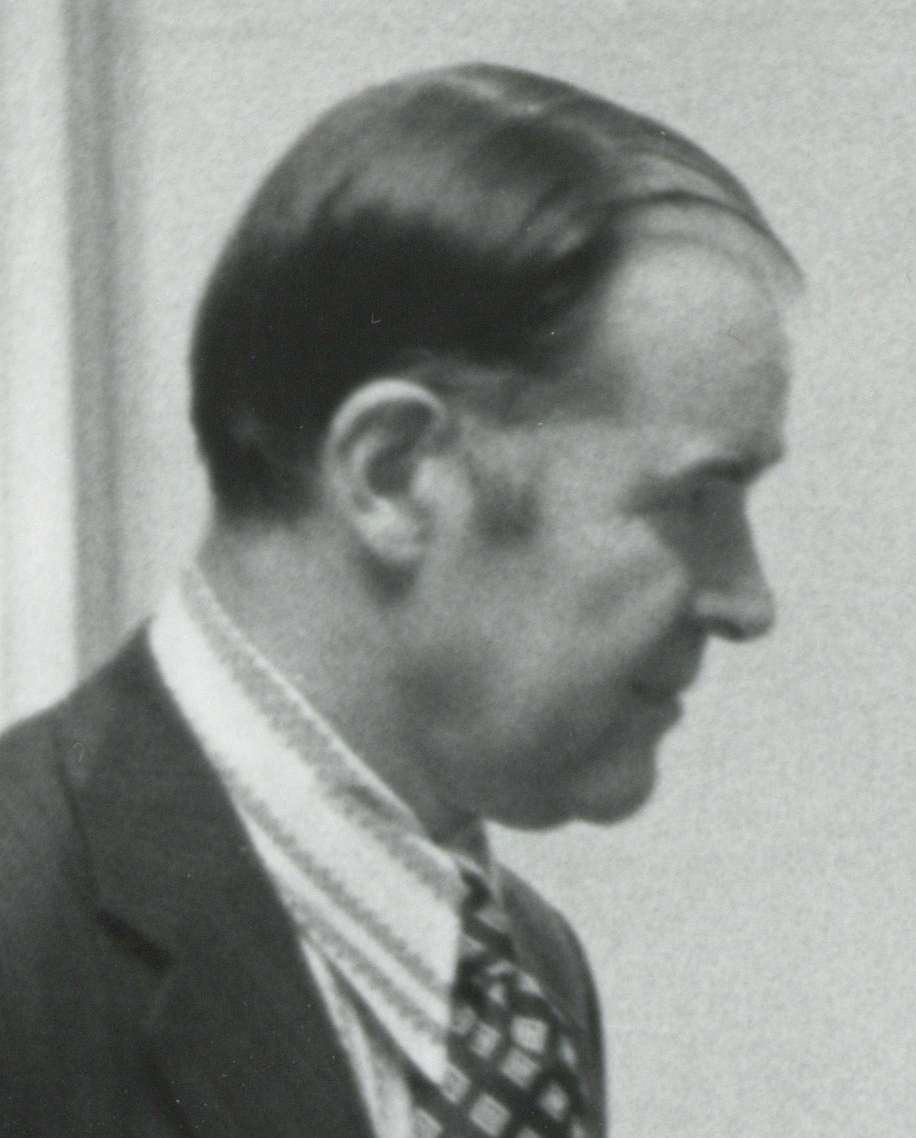
Barber Conable on April 5, 1973

A long-time ally of Richard Nixon, Conable broke with him in disgust after the revelations of the Watergate scandal. When the White House released a tape of Nixon instructing his chief of staff H. R. Haldeman to obstruct the FBI investigation, Conable said it was a "smoking gun", a phrase which quickly entered the political folklore.

In 1980, Conable appeared in Milton Friedman's PBS series Free to Choose.

Conable retired from the House in 1984.

== President of the World Bank ==
From 1986 until August 31, 1991, Conable was president of the World Bank. His experience as a legislator proved crucial as he persuaded his former colleagues to almost double Congress's appropriations for the bank.

After the Tiananmen Square protests and massacre, Conable opposed elements of the George H.W. Bush administration and Congress which sought to take a more punitive stance toward China. In Conable's view, those elements were motivated by the desire to improve their position in the 1992 election by being overly harsh on China. Conable's view was that imposing excessive punishment was ill-advised at a time when Deng Xiaoping was struggling with domestic opponents over whether to continue the reform and opening up. Conable successfully encouraged the World Bank Board of Governors to take an expansive view of humanitarian loans to China, including with regard to environmental loans because of the intrinsic merit of those investments. When asked by academic David M. Lampton what Conable was most proud of in his World Bank interaction with China, Conable answered, "We planted a billion trees in China."

== Literature by and about Conable ==
- Window on Congress: A Congressional Biography of Barber B. Conable Jr., James S. Fleming, Rochester, New York: University of Rochester Press, 2004, ISBN 1-58046-128-X.
- The Conable Years at the World Bank: Major Policy Addresses of Barber B. Conable, 1986–91, Barber B. Conable Jr., Washington, D.C.: World Bank, 1991, ISBN 0-8213-1901-9.
- Congress and The Income Tax, Barber B. Conable Jr. and Arthur L. Singleton, Norman, Oklahoma: University of Oklahoma Press, 1989, ISBN 0-8061-2195-5.
- Controlling the Cost of Social Security: Held on June 25, 1981, and Sponsored by the American Enterprise Institute for Public Policy Research, Barber B. Conable Jr., John Charles, et al., Washington, D.C.: The institute, 1981, ISBN 0-8447-2225-1.
- Foreign Assistance in a Time of Constraints, Barber B. Conable Jr., Richard S. Belous, S. Dahlia Stern, and Nita Christine Kent, eds., Washington, D.C.: National Planning Association, 1995, ISBN 0-89068-132-5.
- Papers at Cornell University.

U.S. House of Representatives
| Preceded by Harold Ostertag | Member of the U.S. House of Representatives from New York's 37th congressional district 1965–1973 | Succeeded by Thaddeus Dulski |
| Preceded by James Hanley | Member of the U.S. House of Representatives from New York's 35th congressional district 1973–1983 | Constituency abolished |
| Preceded by Herman T. Schneebeli | Ranking Member of the House Ways and Means Committee; 1977–1985 | Succeeded by John Duncan Sr. |
| Preceded by David Martin | Member of the U.S. House of Representatives from New York's 30th congressional district 1983–1985 | Succeeded by Fred Eckert |
Party political offices
| Preceded by Robert Taft Jr. | Chair of the House Republican Research Committee; 1971–1973 | Succeeded by Lou Frey |
| Preceded by John Jacob Rhodes | Chair of the House Republican Policy Committee; 1973–1977 | Succeeded by Del M. Clawson |
Diplomatic posts
| Preceded by Tom Clausen | President of the World Bank Group; 1986–1991 | Succeeded by Lewis Preston |
