= Abraham M. Schermerhorn =

American politician (1791–1855)

3rd Mayor of Rochester, New York
- In office December 1836 – March 1837
- Preceded by: Jacob Gould
- Succeeded by: Thomas Kempshall

Member of the U.S. House of Representatives from New York's 28th district
- In office March 4, 1849 – March 3, 1853
- Preceded by: Elias B. Holmes
- Succeeded by: George Hastings

Member of the New York State Assembly from the Monroe County, 2nd district
- In office January 1, 1848 – December 31, 1848
- Preceded by: new district
- Succeeded by: L. Ward Smith

Personal details
- Born: December 11, 1791 Schenectady, New York, US
- Died: August 22, 1855 (aged 63) Savin Rock, Connecticut, US
- Party: Whig
- Spouse: Mary Kent Adams
- Education: Union College
- Profession: Banker; Politician

Abraham Mans Schermerhorn (December 11, 1791 – August 22, 1855) was an American Politician. A member of the Whig Party, he was the third mayor of Rochester, New York from 1836 to 1837 then as a United States Representative from New York in the early 1850s. Prior to entering politics, he was cashier at Rochester's first bank, earning a nickname as "money king" of the Genesee region.

== Early life ==
He was born in 1791 in Schenectady. He completed preparatory studies and graduated from Union College in 1810. He studied law, was admitted to the bar in 1812, and in 1813, he moved to Rochester,

== Political career ==
He became the "money king" of the Genesee region as the cashier of Rochester's first bank, before becoming a supervisor of the city in 1834.

In 1837, he became the third mayor of Rochester but resigned after two months to become secretary to the New York State Senate. He became a member of the New York State Assembly (Monroe Co., 2nd D.) in 1848, and was elected as a Whig to the Thirty-first and Thirty-second Congresses, representing New York's 28th congressional district holding office from March 4, 1849, to March 3, 1853.

== Personal life ==
Schermerhorn was married to Mary Kent Adams (1798–1865). Together, they were the parents of:

- Susan M. Schermerhorn (d. 1846)
- James Adams Schermerhorn (1816–1879), who married Sarah Maria Parker (1819–1874) in 1849.

In 1855, he died in Savin Rock, near West Haven, Connecticut. He was interred in Mount Hope Cemetery, Rochester.

Political offices
Preceded by Jacob Gould	Mayor of Rochester, NY; December 1836-1837	Succeeded by Thomas Kempshall
New York State Assembly
Preceded by new district	New York State Assembly; Monroe County, 2nd District; 1848	Succeeded by L. Ward Smith
U.S. House of Representatives
Preceded by Elias B. Holmes	Member of the U.S. House of Representatives from New York's 28th congressional district 1849–1853	Succeeded by George Hastings
