= Levi Ward Smith =

American politician

- Born: 25 May 1819; Rochester, New York, US
- Died: 22 December 1863 (aged 44); Germantown, Pennsylvania, US
- Resting place: Mount Hope Cemetery, Rochester, New York, US
- Education: Yale College
- Occupations: Attorney; Clergyman
- Political party: Whig party

Levi Ward Smith (25 May 1819 – 22 December 1863) was an American politician and minister.

He was the eldest son of Silas O. Smith of Rochester, New York, one of the earliest residents of Monroe County, New York.

He began his college life at Hamilton College, but transferred to Yale College at the beginning of his Junior year. He graduated from Yale in 1839. After leaving college he studied law, including a year at Harvard Law School, was admitted to the bar in Rochester, and engaged in his chosen profession, also devoting much time to politics as a leader of the Whig party in his neighborhood. He was a member of the New York State Assembly in 1849 and 1850, and was subsequently, Adjutant General of New York of the state under Gov. Washington Hunt; Smith succeeded his brother-in-law Samuel Stevens and was succeeded by Robert E. Temple.

After some time he abandoned his legal and political career to study for the ministry of the Protestant Episcopal Church. Having been admitted to orders, he was made the minister of a church in Albion, New York, where he remained two years. He then resigned his post and visited Europe. On his return he became Rector of St Michael's Church, in Germantown, Pennsylvania. In 1863 he was appointed a chaplain in the regular army and assigned to the charge of the Military Hospital in Germantown. As his health was impaired by these two-fold engagements, he resigned his rectorship and devoted himself to the hospital until disease completely prostrated him.

He died at Germantown, Pennsylvania in December 1863. His remains were removed to Rochester for interment.

New York State Assembly
Preceded by Abraham M. Schermerhorn	New York State Assembly; Monroe County, 2nd District; 1849–1850	Succeeded by William A. Fitzhugh
