= Sweet Memorial Building =

- U.S. National Register of Historic Places
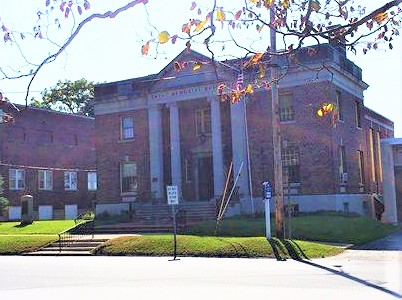

- Location within New York Location within the United States
- Location: 455 Main St., Phoenix, New York
- Coordinates: 43°13′45″N 76°17′58″W
- Area: less than one acre
- Built: 1929
- Architect: Brockway, Albert L.
- Architectural style: Classical Revival
- NRHP reference No.: 90000695
- Added to NRHP: April 26, 1990

Sweet Memorial Building is a historic village hall and auditorium located at Phoenix in Oswego County, New York. It is T-shaped structure built in 1929 in the Neoclassical style. It features a two-story cast stone portico surmounted by a cast stone pediment. It stands as a memorial to Congressman Thaddeus Campbell Sweet (1872–1928), who helped to rebuild the village after a fire in 1916.

It was listed on the National Register of Historic Places in 1990.
