= Elias B. Holmes =

American politician (1807–1866)

Member of the U.S. House of Representatives from New York's 28th district
- In office March 4, 1845 – March 3, 1849
- Preceded by: Thomas J. Paterson
- Succeeded by: Abraham M. Schermerhorn

Personal details
- Born: Elias Bellows Holmes; May 22, 1807 Fletcher, Vermont, U.S.
- Died: July 31, 1866 (aged 59) Brockport, New York, U.S.
- Resting place: City Cemetery
- Party: Whig
- Profession: Politician, lawyer

Elias Bellows Holmes (May 22, 1807 – July 31, 1866) was a U.S. representative from New York.

Born in Fletcher, Vermont, Holmes attended the district schools and the academy in St. Albans, Vermont. He taught school. He studied law at Pittsford, New York. He was admitted to the bar in 1830. He moved to Brockport, New York, in 1831 and commenced the practice of law. He engaged in agricultural pursuits and transportation. He engaged in running canal packets between Rochester and Buffalo in 1840–1855. He was one of the promoters and constructors of the Rochester and Niagara Falls Railroad and a director until it merged with the New York Central Railroad.

Holmes was elected as a Whig to the Twenty-ninth and Thirtieth Congresses (March 4, 1845 – March 3, 1849). He was not a candidate for renomination. He resumed agricultural pursuits. He died in Brockport, New York, July 31, 1866. He was interred in City Cemetery.

== Sources ==
- United States Congress. "Elias B. Holmes (id: H000736)". Biographical Directory of the United States Congress.

U.S. House of Representatives
Preceded by Thomas J. Paterson	Member of the U.S. House of Representatives from New York's 28th congressional district 1845–1849	Succeeded by Abraham M. Schermerhorn
