= Phoenix, New York =

- Village
- Location in Oswego County and the state of New York.
- Coordinates: 43°13′53″N 76°17′53″W
- Country: United States
- State: New York
- County: Oswego

Government
  - Type: Mayor-council government
  - Mayor: Brian Borchik
  - Deputy Mayor: Jennifer Maxam

Area
  - Total: 1.29 sq mi (3.34 km^{2})
  - Land: 1.17 sq mi (3.03 km^{2})
  - Water: 0.12 sq mi (0.31 km^{2})
- Elevation: 371 ft (113 m)

Population (2020)
  - Total: 2,226
  - Density: 1,901.7/sq mi (734.24/km^{2})
- Time zone: UTC-5 (EST)
  - Summer (DST): UTC-4 (EDT)
- ZIP code: 13135
- Area code: 315
- FIPS code: 36-57661
- GNIS feature ID: 0960322
- Website: Village Website

Phoenix is a village in Oswego County, New York, United States. As of the 2020 census, Phoenix had a population of 2,226. The name is derived from Alexander Phoenix. The village of Phoenix lies in the Lake Ontario lake-effect snow belt, with seasonal snow totals regularly exceeding 200 in (510 cm). Phoenix lies in the southwest part of the town of Schroeppel.

== History ==
The village was incorporated in 1848.

At around 11:00 pm on September 23, 1916, Phoenix was nearly completely devastated by a fire that destroyed most of the business district, killing 1 person. The fire knocked out use of the fire fighting pumps that the village relied on. The fire lasted until early morning of the 24th.

Oswego Canal Lock 1 is located beside Culvert Street, off Main Street (County Road 57). It was built around 1911, and has a lift of 10.2 ft (3.11 m) to the south. Just north of the canal lock is a heel trunnion single-leaf bascule bridge carrying Culvert Street which raises up when the downstream gates of the lock are opened in order to provide adequate clearance for passing marine vessels. Built in 1986, it has a span of 67 ft (20 m). Another heel trunnion single-leaf bascule bridge is located along the canal lock, constructed in 1912, which was used to access the lockhouse and factories on Mill Island (now called Lock Island) from nearby Bridge Street. It was taken out of service when a driveway was routed to the site from Culvert Street. The bridge is currently locked in the raised position.

On April 20, 2002, around 6:50 am, many residents of Phoenix were shaken awake by a magnitude 5.2 earthquake centered near Plattsburgh, New York. No damage or injuries were reported in the area.

The Northrup-Gilbert House, St. John's Episcopal Church, and Sweet Memorial Building are listed on the National Register of Historic Places.

== Geography ==
The village is on the east side of the Oswego River and the Oswego Canal. According to the United States Census Bureau, the village has a total area of 1.2 mi^{2} (3.1 km^{2}), of which 1.1 mi^{2} (2.8 km^{2}) is land and 0.1 mi^{2} (0.26 km^{2}) (8.80%) is water.

== Demographics ==
Historical population
Census	Pop.	Note	%±
1850	872		—
1870	1,418		—
1880	1,312		−7.5%
1890	1,466		11.7%
1900	1,532		4.5%
1910	1,642		7.2%
1920	1,747		6.4%
1930	1,758		0.6%
1940	1,757		−0.1%
1950	1,917		9.1%
1960	2,408		25.6%
1970	2,617		8.7%
1980	2,357		−9.9%
1990	2,435		3.3%
2000	2,251		−7.6%
2010	2,382		5.8%
2020	2,226		−6.5%
U.S. Decennial Census

As of the census of 2000, there were 2,251 people, 959 households, and 578 families residing in the village. The population density was 1,966.2 inhabitants per square mile (759.2/km^{2}). There were 1,041 housing units at an average density of 909.3 per square mile (351.1/km^{2}). The racial makeup of the village was 98.22% White, 0.36% African American, 0.53% Native American, 0.22% Asian, 0.13% from other races, and 0.53% from two or more races. Hispanic or Latino of any race were 0.98% of the population.

There were 959 households, out of which 33.4% had children under the age of 18 living with them, 39.7% were married couples living together, 17.0% had a female householder with no husband present, and 39.7% were non-families. 33.6% of all households were made up of individuals, and 17.1% had someone living alone who was 65 years of age or older. The average household size was 2.34 and the average family size was 2.98.

In the village, the population was spread out, with 27.2% under the age of 18, 8.4% from 18 to 24, 29.2% from 25 to 44, 21.3% from 45 to 64, and 13.9% who were 65 years of age or older. The median age was 36 years. For every 100 females, there were 87.1 males. For every 100 females age 18 and over, there were 80.5 males.

The median income for a household in the village was $30,199, and the median income for a family was $36,442. Males had a median income of $29,542 versus $22,412 for females. The per capita income for the village was $16,434. About 9.6% of families and 13.2% of the population were below the poverty line, including 19.0% of those under age 18 and 11.2% of those age 65 or over.

== Notable person ==
Thaddeus C. Sweet, New York State Representative

Phoenix is the town where the main character in the fictional book "Letters from Carrie" writes about living in a small town on the Oswego River and Canal in upstate NY in the mid1850s (author Janet D. Harder)
