= Thaddeus C. Sweet =

American politician

Thaddeus Campbell Sweet
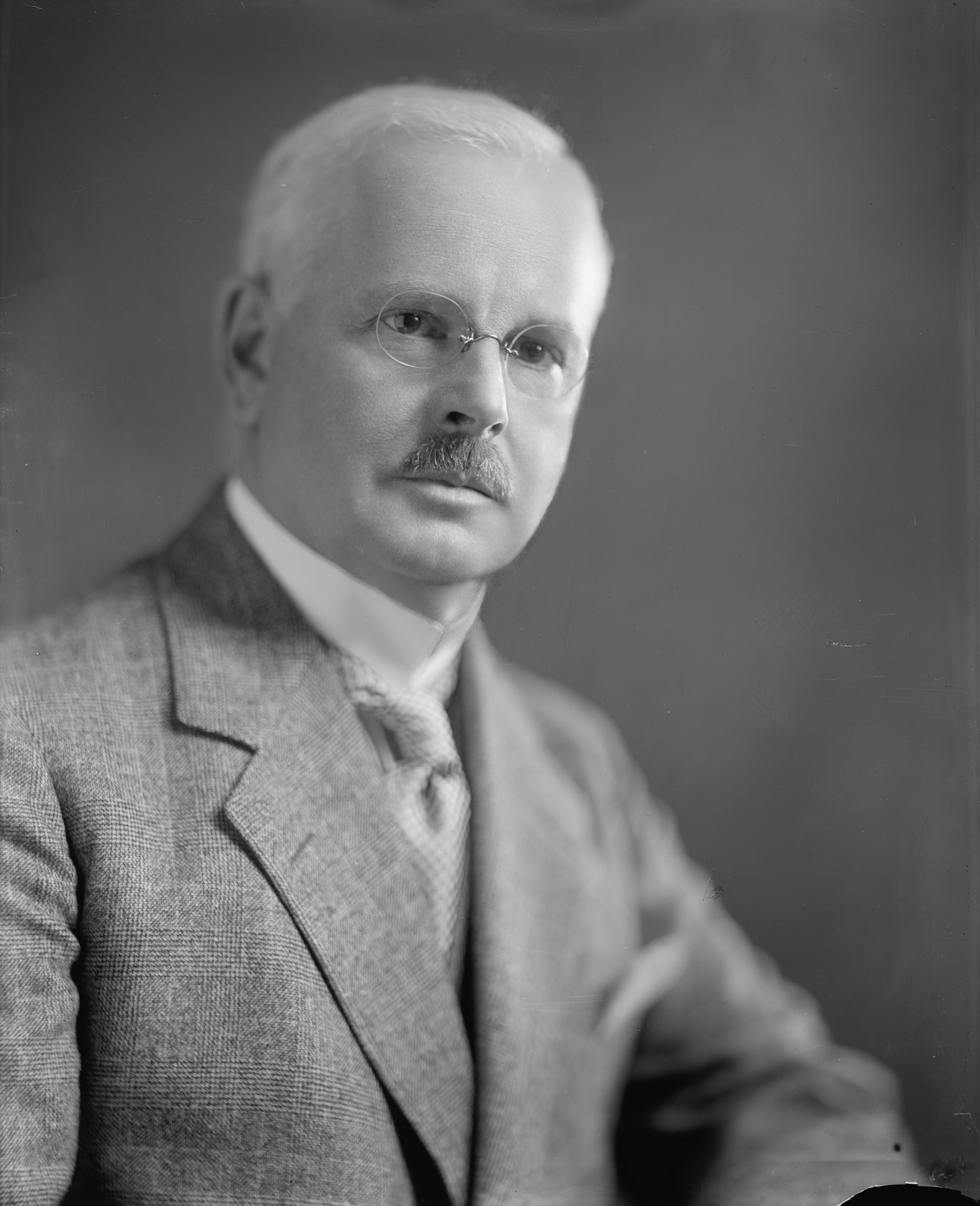

Member of the U.S. House of Representatives from New York's 32nd district
- In office November 6, 1923 – May 1, 1928
- Preceded by: Luther W. Mott
- Succeeded by: Francis D. Culkin

Member of the New York State Assembly from the Oswego County district
- In office January 1, 1910 – December 31, 1920
- Preceded by: Frank L. Smith
- Succeeded by: Ezra Barnes

Personal details
- Born: November 16, 1872 Phoenix, New York
- Died: May 1, 1928 (aged 55) Whitney Point, New York
- Party: Republican Party
- Parent(s): Anthony Wayne Sweet and Sarah Elizabeth Campbell

Thaddeus Campbell Sweet (November 16, 1872 – May 1, 1928) was an American manufacturer and politician from New York. He represented New York's 32nd congressional district from 1923 to 1928.

== Biography ==
He was born on November 16, 1872, in Phoenix, New York, to Anthony Wayne Sweet and Sarah Elizabeth Campbell. He attended the public schools, and graduated from Phoenix Academy and High School. Then he entered business and for two years served as a traveling salesman. In 1895, he began the manufacture of paper and was President of the Sweet Paper Manufacturing Co. He also engaged in banking. He was town clerk of Phoenix from 1896 to 1899.

He was a member of the New York State Assembly (Oswego Co.) in 1910, 1911, 1912, 1913, 1914, 1915, 1916, 1917, 1918, 1919 and 1920; and was Speaker from 1914 to 1920. As Speaker, in 1919 Sweet opposed the protective labor legislation for women and children promoted by newly enfranchised New York women, refusing to allow it to get to the Assembly floor. That fall, suffragist Marion Dickerman fought a tough race to defeat his bid for reelection, and though she lost she cut substantially into his support and, for the first time in his political career, made him work hard to win. Suffragists believed Dickerman's race quashed his gubernatorial chances. In 1920 he proposed the infamous expulsion of socialists from the New York Assembly.

He was a delegate to the 1916 and 1924 Republican National Conventions.

He was elected to the 68th United States Congress in 1923 to fill the vacancy caused by the death of Luther W. Mott and served from November 6, 1923, until his death in office, having been re-elected to the 69th and 70th United States Congresses.

=== Death ===
Thaddeus Sweet was the first sitting member of Congress to die in an airplane accident. Shortly after breakfast on May 1, 1928, he and the pilot Lt. Bushrod Hoppin, U.S. Army, took off in a new Army observation plane, Curtiss O-1B Falcon, serial number 27-279, assigned at Middletown Air Depot, Pennsylvania, from Bolling Field to fly to Oswego, New York, where he was to make a speech. Lt. Hoppin, known as a careful pilot, flew into a storm between Binghamton, New York, and Cortland, New York.

He thought it best to land and selected a field on a stock farm near Whitney Point, New York. The field was knobbly, and the airplane bounced and turned a somersault. Sweet, having unbuckled his safety belt, was pitched against the cockpit wall, and killed by a head injury. Lt. Hoppin, belted in his seat, was unbruised. Sweet was buried at the Rural Cemetery at Phoenix, New York.

== Legacy ==
The Sweet Memorial Building was dedicated to him in 1929. It was listed on the National Register of Historic Places in 1990.

== See also ==
- List of members of the United States Congress who died in office (1900–1949)

New York State Assembly
| Preceded by Frank L. Smith | New York State Assembly; Oswego County; 1910–1920 | Succeeded by Ezra Barnes |
Political offices
| Preceded by Al Smith | Speaker of the New York State Assembly; 1914–1920 | Succeeded by H. Edmund Machold |
U.S. House of Representatives
| Preceded by Luther W. Mott | Member of the U.S. House of Representatives from New York's 32nd congressional district 1923–1928 | Succeeded by Francis D. Culkin |
