= Jay Gibbons (politician) =

American politician

Jay Gibbons (March 25, 1833, in Westerlo, New York – 1897, in Greene County, New York) was an American politician from New York.

== Life ==
He was the son of Alfred Gibbons and Dorcas (Sweet) Gibbons. On June 10, 1856, he married Emily Lockwood.

He was a member of the New York State Assembly (Albany Co., 1st D.) in 1861. Gibbons was arrested on February 17, 1861 on charges of bribery. He was expelled from the Assembly On April 3, 1861, for attempting to acquire bribes in order to vote for certain legislation.

== See also ==
- List of New York Legislature members expelled or censured

New York State Assembly
Preceded by John I. Slingerland	New York State Assembly; Albany County, 1st District; 1861	Succeeded by vacant
