= William Irvine (New York politician) =

American politician (1820–1882)

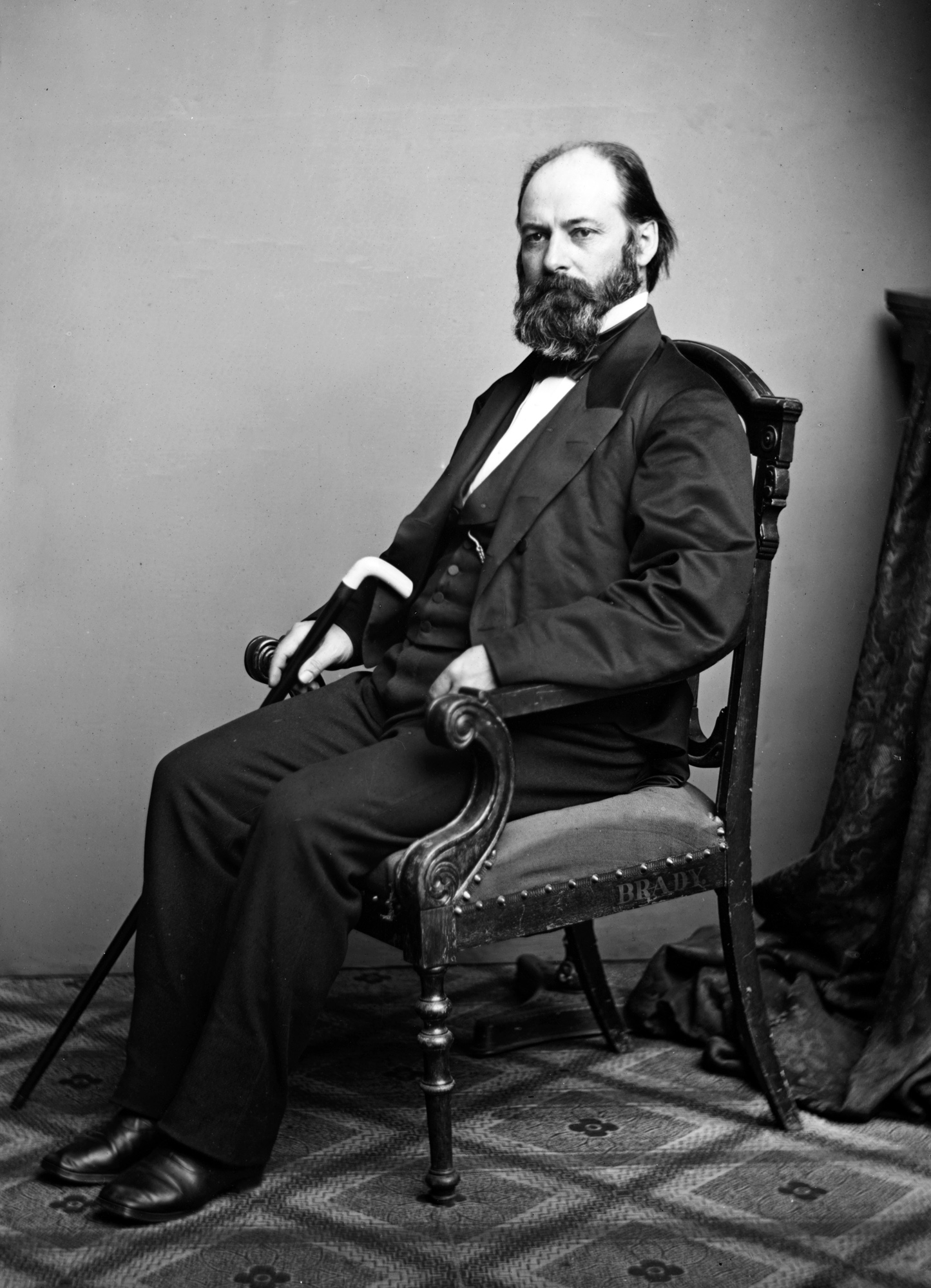

Member of the U.S. House of Representatives from New York's 28th district
- In office March 4, 1859 – March 3, 1861
- Preceded by: William H. Kelsey
- Succeeded by: Robert B. Van Valkenburgh

Personal details
- Born: February 14, 1820 Whitney Point, New York, US
- Died: November 12, 1882 (aged 62) San Francisco, California, US
- Party: Republican
- Profession: Attorney; politician

Military service
- Allegiance: United States
- Branch/service: United States Army; Union Army
- Rank: Lieutenant Colonel; Brevet Brigadier General
- Unit: 10th New York Cavalry
- Battles/wars: American Civil War

William Irvine (February 14, 1820 – November 12, 1882) was an American politician, a United States Representative for New York's 28th district, and a lieutenant colonel in the Union Army during the American Civil War.

== Biography ==
Irvine was born in Whitneys Point, Broome County, New York. He attended the common schools. He and moved to Greene County, New York, in 1841. He studied law; was admitted to the bar in 1849.

== Career ==
Irvine commenced his law practice in Corning, Steuben County, New York. He was a delegate to Republican National Convention from New York, 1856.

Elected to the United States House of Representatives in 1858 as a Republican in New York's 28th district, Irvine served only one term from March 4, 1859 to March 3, 1861.

At the start of the Civil War he entered the army and assisted in raising the 10th New York Cavalry, of which he became lieutenant colonel on November 25, 1861. He with his regiment served in fifty-five battle engagements from 1862 to the last conflict at Appomattox, Virginia in April 1865. He was brevetted to brigadier general on March 13, 1865. In 1865 and 1866 he was adjutant general of New York, succeeding John T. Sprague. He was succeeded by Selden E. Marvin. After the war he moved to San Francisco, California and resumed the practice of law until his death.

== Death ==
Irvine died in San Francisco, California, on November 12, 1882 (age 62). He is interred at Woodlawn Cemetery, Elmira, Chemung County, New York.

U.S. House of Representatives
Preceded by William H. Kelsey	Member of the U.S. House of Representatives from New York's 28th congressional district 1859–1861	Succeeded by Robert B. Van Valkenburgh
