= Timothy Childs =

American politician (1790–1847)

Member of the U.S. House of Representatives from New York
- In office March 4, 1841 – March 3, 1843
- Preceded by: Thomas Kempshall
- Succeeded by: Thomas J. Paterson
- Constituency: 28th district
- In office March 4, 1835 – March 3, 1839
- Preceded by: Frederick Whittlesey
- Succeeded by: Thomas Kempshall
- Constituency: 28th district
- In office March 4, 1829 – March 3, 1831
- Preceded by: Daniel D. Barnard
- Succeeded by: Frederick Whittlesey
- Constituency: 27th district

Chairman of the U.S. House Committee on Expenditures in the Post Office Department
- In office 1837–1839
- Preceded by: Albert Gallatin Hawes
- Succeeded by: Richard P. Marvin

Member of the New York State Assembly
- In office January 1, 1833 – December 31, 1833 Serving with Levi Pond, Milton Sheldon
- Preceded by: Samuel G. Andrews, Ira Bellows, William B. Brown
- Succeeded by: Elihu Church, Fletcher Mathews Haight, Jeremy S. Stone
- Constituency: Monroe County
- In office January 1, 1828 – December 31, 1828 Serving with Ezra Sheldon Jr., Francis Storm
- Preceded by: Peter Price, Abelard Reynolds, Joseph Sibley
- Succeeded by: John Garbutt, Heman Norton, Reuben Willey
- Constituency: Monroe County

District Attorney of Monroe County, New York
- In office 1821–1831
- Preceded by: None (position created)
- Succeeded by: Vincent Mathews

Personal details
- Born: January 1, 1790 Pittsfield, Massachusetts, US
- Died: November 25, 1847 (aged 57) At sea aboard the ship Emily
- Party: Federalist; Anti-Masonic; Anti-Jacksonian; Whig
- Spouse(s): Catherine Adams; Louisa S. Dickinson
- Education: Williams College; Litchfield Law School
- Profession: lawyer

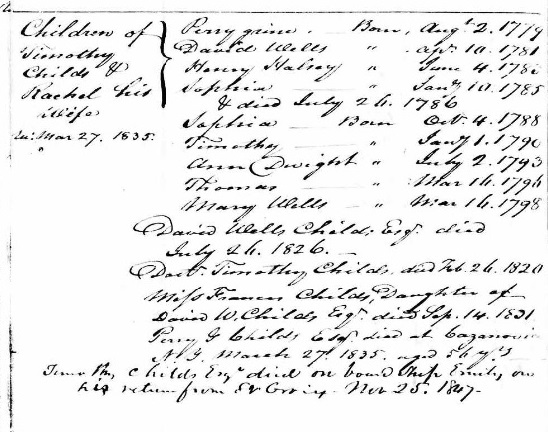
Death record, Timothy Childs, Jr.

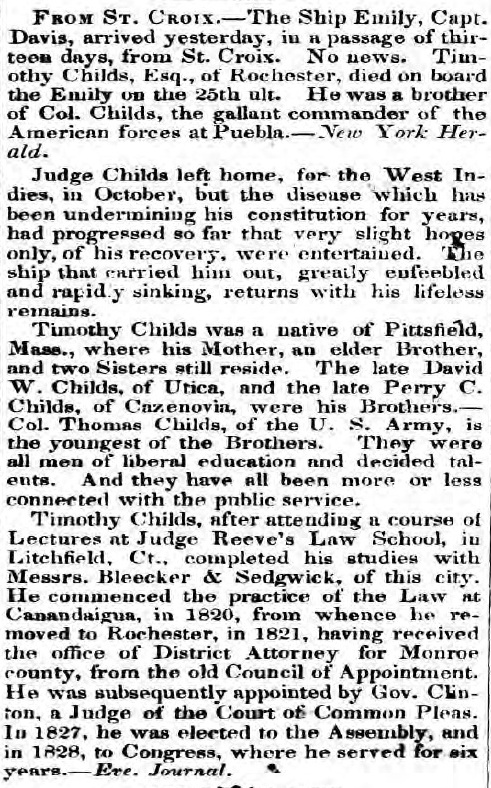
Obituary for Timothy Childs, Jr. Oneida (N.Y.) Morning Herald, December 8, 1847

Timothy Childs Jr. (January 1, 1790 – November 25, 1847) was a U.S. representative from New York. He represented Monroe County for eight non-consecutive terms in Congress between 1829 and 1843.

== Early life ==
Childs was born in Pittsfield, Massachusetts, on January 1, 1790. He was the son of Rachel (née Easton) Childs (1760–1852) and Timothy Childs (1748–1821), a Revolutionary War officer who studied at Harvard, became a medical doctor and served in the Massachusetts House of Representatives.

Childs graduated from Williams College in 1811 and Litchfield Law School in 1814. He completed his studies at the Albany firm of Harmanus Bleecker, afterwards practicing law in New York, first in Canandaigua, and then in Rochester.

== Career ==
Originally a Federalist, while residing in Canandaigua, Childs served in offices including Ontario County Commissioner and the judicial position of Master in Chancery.

He served as district attorney of Monroe County, New York, from 1821 to 1831, the first to hold this position. He served as a member of the New York State Assembly in 1828, and in the late 1820s he also served as Monroe County judge.

Childs was elected as an Anti-Mason to the Twenty-first Congress (March 4, 1829 – March 3, 1831). After his term expired he returned to practicing law in Rochester.

In 1833, he was elected again to the New York State Assembly.

In 1834, he was elected as an Anti-Jacksonian to the Twenty-fourth Congress. He was reelected as a Whig in 1836, and served from March 4, 1835, to March 3, 1839. During his 1837 to 1839 term, Childs was appointed Chairman of the Committee on Expenditures in the Post Office Department.

Childs was elected to Congress again as a Whig in 1840 and served one term, March 4, 1841, to March 3, 1843. He resumed practicing law following the completion of his final term in Congress.

== Death ==
In the late 1840s, Childs traveled to Saint Croix, where he went to improve his health. He died aboard the ship Emily on November 25, 1847, while en route from Saint Croix to the United States.

== Personal life ==
In 1817, he married Catherine Adams.

In December 1830 he married Louisa Stewart (née Shepherd) Dickinson of North Carolina in a ceremony in Norfolk, Virginia. Louisa was the widow of Joel Dickinson.

U.S. House of Representatives
Preceded by Daniel D. Barnard	Member of the U.S. House of Representatives from New York's 27th congressional district 1829–1831	Succeeded by Frederick Whittlesey
Preceded by Frederick Whittlesey	Member of the U.S. House of Representatives from New York's 28th congressional district 1835–1839	Succeeded by Thomas Kempshall
Preceded by Thomas Kempshall	Member of the U.S. House of Representatives from New York's 28th congressional district 1841–1843	Succeeded by Thomas J. Paterson
