= Robert E. Temple =

American attorney and army officer (1808–1854)

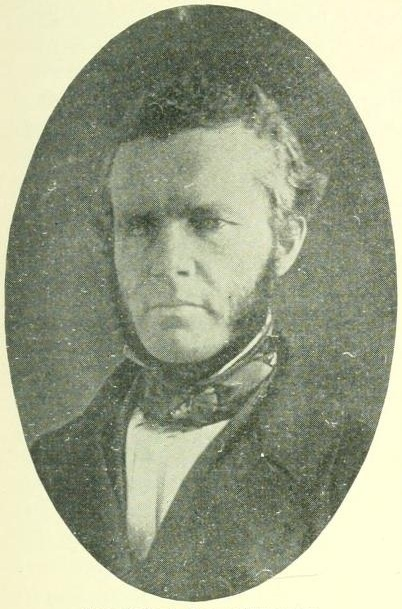
- From Volume 2 (1911) of Norwich University, 1819-1911; Her History, Her Graduates, Her Roll of Honor
- Born: 24 September 1808; Castleton, Vermont, US
- Died: 20 July 1854 (aged 45); Albany, New York, US
- Burial place: Albany Rural Cemetery, Menands, New York, US
- Alma mater: United States Military Academy
- Spouse: Catharine Margaret James (m. 1839–1854)
- Children: 9
- Military career
- Service: United States Army; New York Militia
- Service years: 1828–1839, 1847–1848 (Army); 1846–1847, 1853–1854 (Militia)
- Rank: Colonel (Army); Brigadier General (Militia)
- Unit: US Army Field Artillery Branch
- Commands: Baton Rouge Arsenal; 6th New York Volunteer Infantry Regiment; 10th Infantry Regiment; Adjutant General of New York
- Wars: Seminole Wars; Mexican–American War
- Other work: Attorney

Robert Emmet Temple (24 September 1808 – 20 July 1854) was an American attorney and military officer from Castleton, Vermont. An 1828 graduate of the United States Military Academy at West Point, he was a veteran of the Seminole Wars and served until resigning as a first lieutenant. He practiced law in Albany, New York from 1839 to 1847 and from 1846 to 1847 served as Adjutant General of New York with the rank of brigadier general. He returned to the army for the Mexican–American War in 1847; commissioned as a colonel, he was appointed to command the 10th Infantry Regiment, which he led until being discharged in 1848. After the war, he returned to his Albany law practice, and he served as state adjutant general again from 1853 to 1854.

== Early life and start of career ==
Robert E. Temple was born in Castleton, Vermont on 24 September 1808, a son of Robert Temple and Clarina (Hawkins) Temple. He was raised and educated in Rutland and attended Norwich University from 1821 to 1824. He then began attendance at the United States Military Academy (West Point), from which he graduated in 1828 ranked fourth of 33. Among his notable classmates were Hugh W. Mercer, Robert E. Clary, Jefferson Davis, and Thomas F. Drayton. At graduation, Temple was commissioned as a second lieutenant of Field Artillery. He was initially assigned to the 3rd Artillery Regiment and performed duty as an assistant professor on the West Point faculty, where he taught mathematics and natural and experimental philosophy until February 1830.

Temple performed temporary recruiting duty in 1830, then joined the garrison at Fort Sullivan, Maine, where he served from 1830 to 1831. He was assigned to the garrison at Fort Independence, Massachusetts in 1831, then attended the Artillery School for Practice at Fort Monroe, Virginia from 1831 to 1832. He performed staff duty at the headquarters of the Eastern Department from 1832 to 1836, including assignment as aide-de-camp to department commander Winfield Scott from June 1832 to May 1833. He took part in the Seminole Wars in 1836, including the 19 July 1836 Battle of Welika Pond outside Fort Defiance near what is now Micanopy, Florida. He was promoted to first lieutenant on 22 June 1836.

== Continued career ==
In November 1836, Temple began performing temporary duty with the Ordnance Corps, including assistant ordnance officer at the Watervliet Arsenal in New York until July 1938, and commander of the Baton Rouge Arsenal in Louisiana until 1839. In July 1838, he transferred from Artillery to Ordnance. In 1839, he was assigned as Ordnance officer at Camp Washington near Trenton, New Jersey. In June 1839, he married Catharine Margaret James of Albany, New York. They were married until his death and were the parents of nine children, six of whom lived to adulthood. Temple resigned his commission and left the army on 15 November 1839.

After leaving the army, Temple studied law, was admitted to the bar, and established a law practice in Albany. He also became active in politics as a Democrat; in addition to attending local conventions as a delegate, in 1844 he was an unsuccessful candidate for the New York State Assembly. In February 1846, he was appointed Adjutant General of New York with the rank of brigadier general, succeeding Thomas Farrington; he served until January 1847 and was succeeded by Samuel Stevens. At the start of the Mexican–American War, Temple was elected to command the 6th New York Volunteer Infantry Regiment, but instead returned to active duty with the army. He was appointed to command the 10th Infantry Regiment with the rank of colonel; he served on the Rio Grande frontier until the end of the war and was discharged on 26 August 1848.

After the war, Temple resumed practicing law in Albany. In 1849, he was a delegate to the Free Soil Party state convention. In 1850, he was an unsuccessful Opposition Party candidate for the state assembly. In 1851, he was an organizer of the Mohawk Valley Railroad and was appointed to its board of directors. From 1851 to 1854, he was a member of the city's water commission, and was responsible for obtaining a new water supply and improving the municipal water system. In 1853, he was re-appointed as the state's adjutant general, succeeding L. Ward Smith; he served until his death and was succeeded by Isaac V. Vanderpoel. In 1854, Temple became ill with tuberculosis, and he died in Albany on 20 July 1854. He was buried at Albany Rural Cemetery in Menands, New York. Catharine Temple also became ill with tuberculosis, and she died in October 1854.
