= Samuel Stevens (New York) =

Adjutant General of New York (1847–1851)

Adjutant General of New York
- In office 1 January 1847 – 1 January 1851
- Preceded by: L. Ward Smith
- Succeeded by: Robert E. Temple

Member of the New York State Assembly
- In office 1 January 1844 – 31 December 1844 Serving with Levi Shaw, Simon Veeder
- Preceded by: Willis Hall, Aaron Van Schaack, John I. Slingerland
- Succeeded by: Clarkson F. Crosby, Ira Harris, Leonard Litchfield
- Constituency: Albany County
- In office 1 January 1827 – 31 December 1827 Serving with John McDonald, Peter J. H. Myers
- Preceded by: Hiram Cole, James Stevenson, Israel Williams, David Woods
- Succeeded by: Jonathan Mosher, Henry Thorn, Henry Whiteside
- Constituency: Washington County
- In office 1 January 1825 – 31 December 1825 Serving with David Campbell, Lemuel Hastings, Ezra Smith
- Preceded by: David Campbell, John Crary, Silas D. Kellogg, Ezra Smith
- Succeeded by: Hiram Cole, James Stevenson, Israel Williams, David Woods
- Constituency: Washington County

Personal details
- Born: 1 September 1794 Hebron, New York, US
- Died: 11 September 1854 (aged 60) Rochester, New York, US
- Resting place: Mount Hope Cemetery, Rochester, New York, US
- Party: Whig
- Other party: National Republican; People's
- Spouse(s): Susan Stevens (d. 1839) Mary Frances Smith (m. 1842–1854)
- Children: 5
- Profession: Attorney

Samuel Stevens (1 September 1794 – 11 September 1854) was an American attorney, legislator, and militia officer from New York. He practiced law in the village of Salem, as well as in Albany. An opponent of the Albany Regency organization that led the state's Democratic Party, he was successively a member of the People's, National Republican, and Whig parties. He represented Washington County in the New York State Assembly as a member of the anti-Regency People's Party in 1825 and as a National Republican (supporter of Governor DeWitt Clinton) in 1827. In 1844, he was a Whig member of the Assembly from Albany County. From 1847 to 1851, he led the New York Militia as the state's adjutant general.

== Early life and start of career ==
Samuel Stevens was born in Washington County, New York on 1 September 1794; the place where he was born and grew up is now in the town of Hebron. He was raised and educated in Washington County, studied law, and attained admission to the bar in 1819. Stevens practiced law in Salem with James B. Gibson and became active in politics as an opponent of the Albany Regency organization led by Martin Van Buren, which controlled New York's Democratic Party. Beginning in 1821, he gained his initial militia experience when he succeeded Gibson as judge advocate of the 16th Brigade. Following the decline of the Federalist Party, Stevens changed party affiliation several times in the 1820s and 1830s as opposition to the Democrats coalesced, moving through the People's, National Republican, and Whig parties. As a member of the People's Party, he served in the New York State Assembly in 1825. In September 1826, he was chosen as a Washington County delegate to the state National Republican convention. As a National Republican, he returned to the Assembly in 1827.

In September 1832, Stevens was proposed as a National Republican candidate for the United States House of Representatives; as an active member of the Freemasons during the ascendancy of the Anti-Masonic Party, Stevens did not make the race in the two-member 17th district because the Anti-Masons in his district refused to form a coalition to oppose the Jacksonian candidates, and the two Andrew Jackson supporters defeated the two Anti-Masons. In February 1833, he took part in a Washington County convention that passed resolutions urging officials to compel South Carolina to adhere to federal authority during the Nullification crisis. In July 1835, Stevens was the Albany area lawyer who organized a meeting of the city's attorneys to commemorate the death of Chief Justice John Marshall and transmit expressions of condolence to his family. In September 1835, he took part in an Albany public meeting that passed resolutions opposing the immediate abolition of slavery, and instead urging a moderate course that would not motivate the slaveholding states to secede.

== Continued career ==
In January 1838, he was a participant in an Albany mass meeting that expressed support for Canada's revolutionaries during the Patriot War. Later in 1838, Stevens moved to Albany, where he practiced law in partnership with Peter Cagger. Among the prospective attorneys who studied under his supervision was James Gibson, the son of his former Salem law partner; some sources indicate that Stevens was Gibson's uncle. Later law partners included Cyrus Stevens, who is identified in some sources as the brother of Samuel Stevens. Upon settling in Albany, Stevens became involved in civic and charitable activities; in May 1838, he was a founding trustee of Albany Medical College. In August 1838, he was a delegate to the Albany County Whig convention; at this meeting, he was selected as a delegate to the party's upcoming state convention. In February 1839, Stevens was appointed counsel of the Albany Exchange Bank. In January 1840, he was appointed a director of the Albany Exchange Company. In May 1839, he was an organizer of the new Albany and West Stockbridge Railroad. In June 1840, Stevens was elected to the board of directors of the Mohawk and Hudson Railroad. By now a Whig, in October 1840 he was a delegate to the party's nominating convention that selected Jonas C. Heartt as the Whig candidate for the 3rd district seat in the New York State Senate.

In 1844 Stevens represented Albany County in the Assembly. He was the Whig candidate for speaker, but Democrats controlled the body and Elisha Litchfield won the post. In August 1844, Stevens hosted Daniel Webster at his home during Webster's visit to Albany. When Webster spoke to a mass Whig gathering several days later, Stevens presided and provided the introduction before Webster began his speech. In October 1844, Stevens was the featured speaker at a mass rally in Albany that celebrated the release of Daniel O'Connell, who had been imprisoned since May for leading the effort to gain independence for Ireland by repealing the Acts of Union 1800. In February 1846, Stevens was admitted to practice before the United States Supreme Court. Stevens was selected to give the featured address at the New York State Fair in Auburn, New York in September 1846; his speech to the state agricultural society advocated the importance of liberal education to farmers and growers. In 1847, he was appointed Adjutant General of New York. During the Mexican–American War, Stevens began submitting to the governor an annual report detailing the condition of the militia, including troops available, weapons on hand, and other details; successive adjutants general have continued yearly submissions.

== Later career ==
In 1849, Stevens was the Whig nominee for Attorney General of New York, and was defeated by Democrat Levi S. Chatfield. In March 1850, Stevens was one of the Albany business and political leaders named to a committee that advocated for the extension of a rail line between Albany and Cohoes to Bennington, Vermont; this proposal eventually became operational as the Albany and Rutland Railroad. In May 1850, he was named a trustee of the Albany Savings Bank. In July 1850, Stevens was one of several military officials who led the Albany-area ceremonies that commemorated the death of President Zachary Taylor. Stevens was one of two featured speakers who gave addresses commemorating the first anniversary of the State and National Law School in August 1850. In October 1850, he was a delegate to the state Whig convention and was chosen as a member of the party's central state committee. In January 1851, he was succeeded as adjutant general by Levi Ward Smith, who was his brother-in-law. In March 1851, he was elected as a trustee of the State and National Law School. In May 1851, he was one of the leaders of the committee that hosted President Millard Fillmore at a reception in Albany. When Daniel Webster spoke at a Whig rally on 31 May, Stevens was among the prominent party members seated on the dais. In September 1851, he was chosen as a delegate to the party's state convention.

In April 1852, Stevens was among the Whig state committee members who issued the call for delegates to attend a state convention to choose delegates to the 1852 Whig National Convention. When Solomon Van Rensselaer died in late April, Stevens was designated to serve as a pallbearer. In July 1852, he was one of the leaders of an Albany mass Whig meeting to celebrate Winfield Scott as the party's presidential nominee. In August 1852, Stevens was one of the state committee members who notified the state's Whigs of the upcoming state convention that was held to choose candidates for presidential elector and statewide offices including governor. When Scott visited Albany in October 1852, Stevens was appointed to the event's committee of escort and reception. Webster died in late October 1852, and Stevens was among the members of the Albany bar who represented the city's lawyer's at Webster's funeral in Marshfield, Massachusetts.

In December 1853, Stevens was elected as second vice president of the Albany Savings Bank. Stevens owned a large home on Academy Park in Albany which had originally been built by a member of the Van Rensselaer family. In April 1854, he sold this residence to John F. Winslow. In the summer of 1854, Stevens was planning to relocate to New York City when he became ill and traveled to the Rochester home of his father-in-law to convalesce. He died there on 11 September 1854. He was buried at Mount Hope Cemetery in Rochester. Stevens's first wife, Susan, died in 1839. In 1842, he married Mary Frances Smith of Rochester, a daughter of Silas O. Smith. With his second wife, he was the father of five children, four of whom lived to adulthood.
