= Slingerlands Historic District =

Historic district in New York, United States

- U.S. National Register of Historic Places
- U.S. Historic district
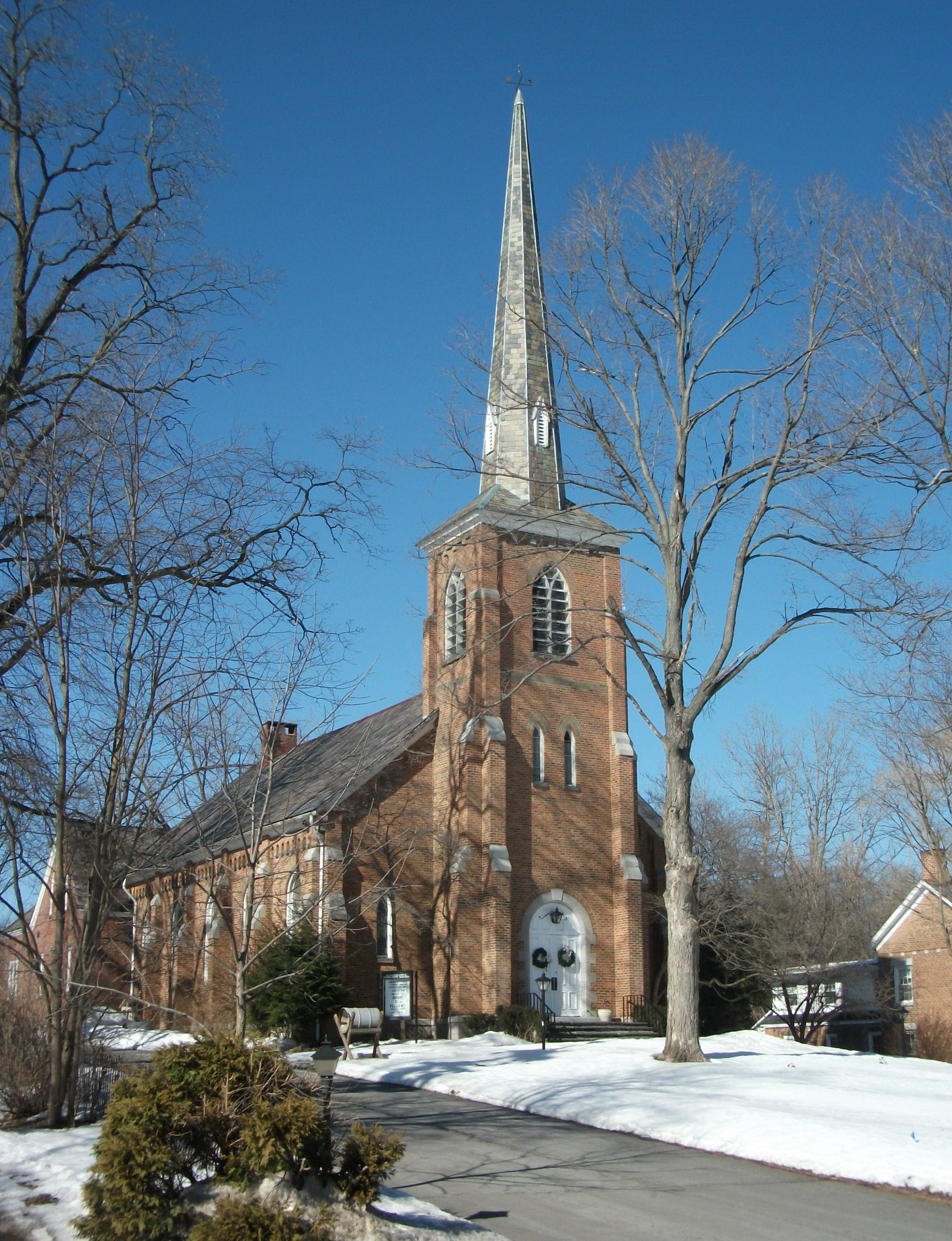
- Slingerlands United Methodist Church, February 2011

- Location within New York Location within the United States
- Location: New Scotland & Mullens Rds., Bridge St., Slingerlands, New York
- Coordinates: 42°37′47″N 73°51′45″W
- Area: 97.96 acres (39.64 ha)
- Built: c. 1790-1940
- Architectural style: Italianate, Commercial Style, Colonial Revival, Federal, Greek Revival, Queen Anne, Stick Style, Bungalow
- NRHP reference No.: 12000007
- Added to NRHP: February 14, 2012

Slingerlands Historic District is a national historic district located at Slingerlands, Town of Bethlehem, Albany County, New York. It encompasses 102 contributing buildings and 1 contributing structure in the hamlet of Slingerlands. The district developed between about 1790 and 1940, and includes notable examples of Italianate, Colonial Revival, Federal, Greek Revival, Queen Anne, Stick style, and Bungalow style architecture, Located in the district is the John I. Slingerland home at 1575 New Scotland Road. Other notable buildings include the Slingerlands United Methodist Church (1871) and the former schoolhouse, converted into apartments.

It was listed on the U.S. National Register of Historic Places in 2012.

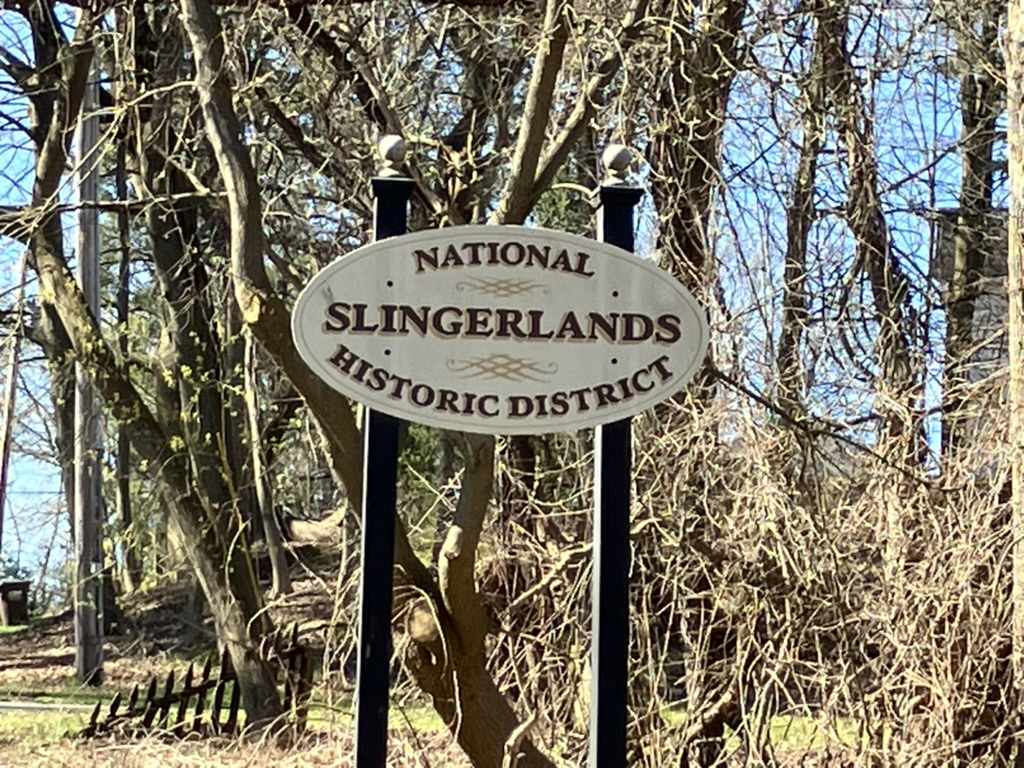
Slingerlands NY National Historic District Sign

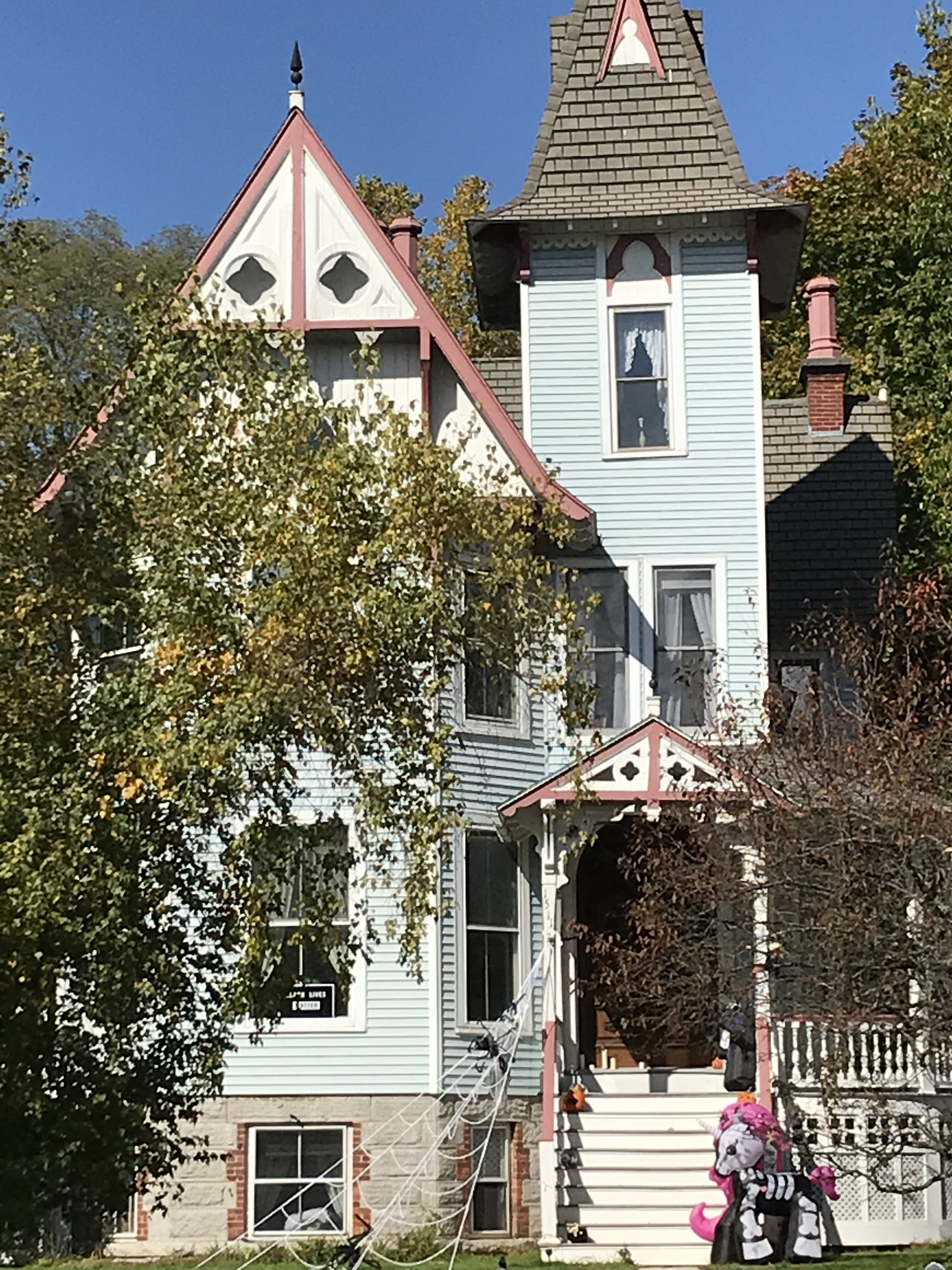
One of the Victorian houses in the Slingerlands Historic District. 1511 New Scotland Road. Referred to as the Ironweed House, as scenes from the movie Ironwood were filmed here in 1987.

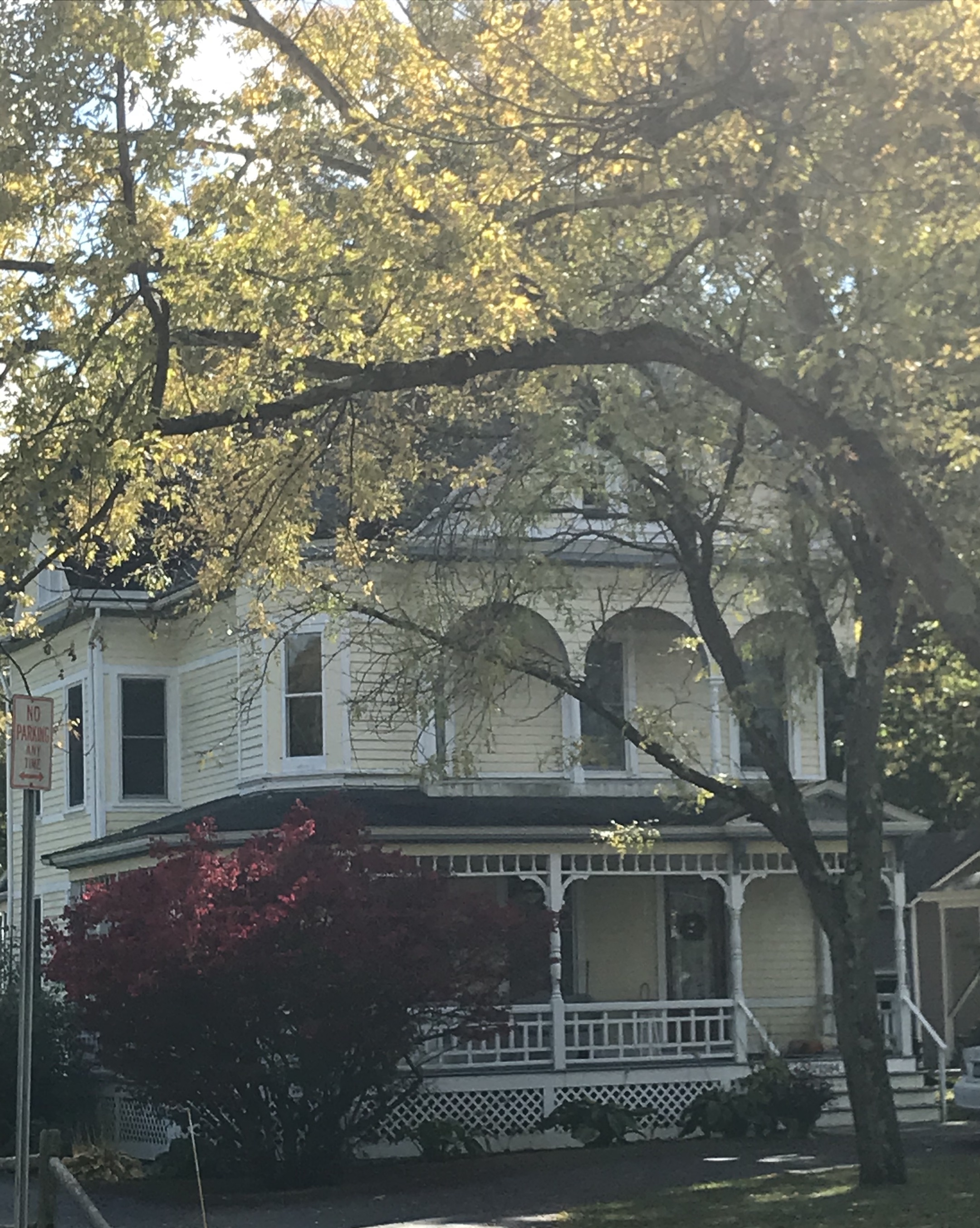
House on New Scotland Road in the Slingerlands Historic District

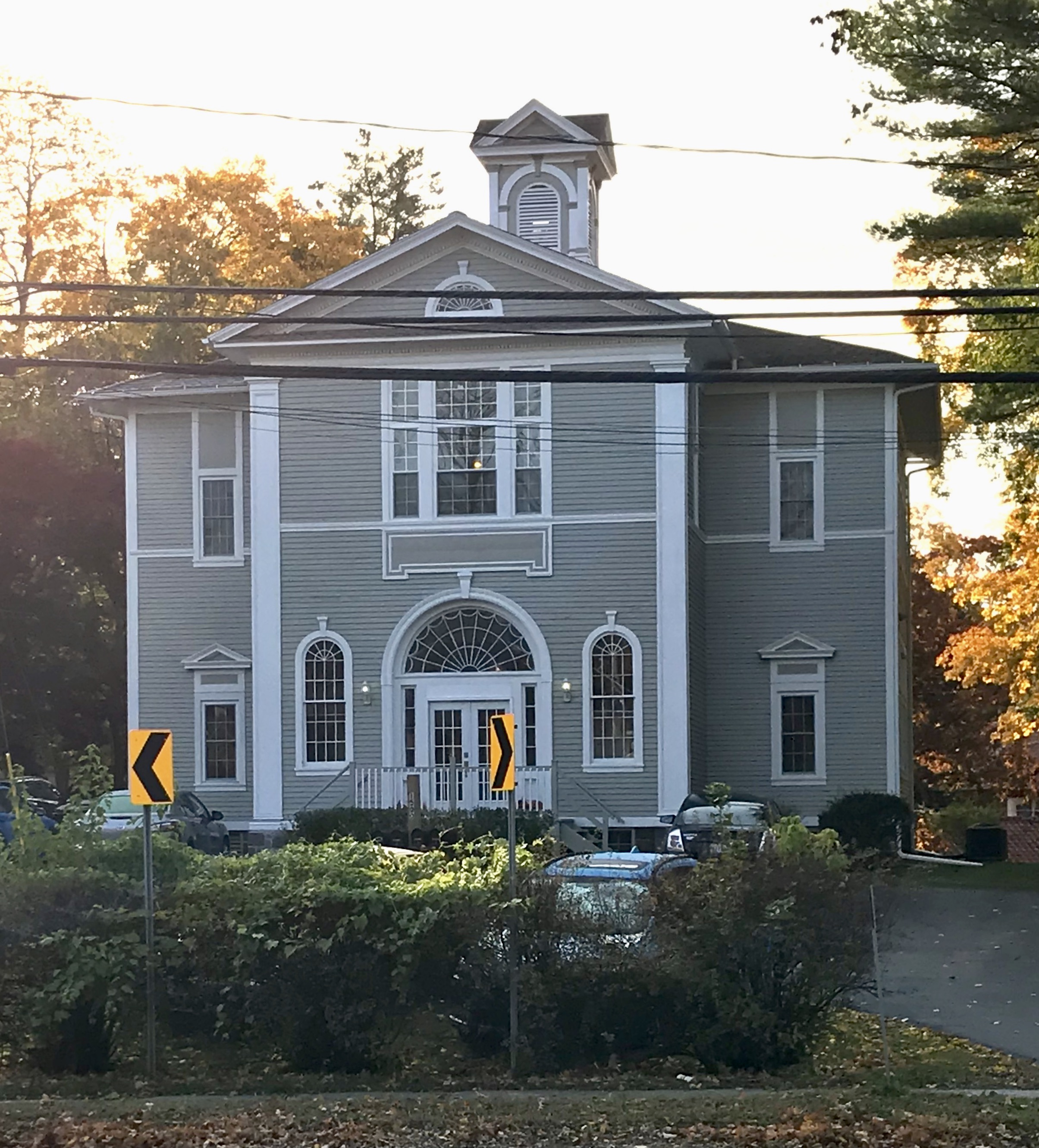
Located in the Slingerlands National Historic District, this was District School #9, built in 1908. It was converted into apartments about 1946.
