= Rollin B. Sanford =

American politician (1874–1957)

Rollin Brewster Sanford
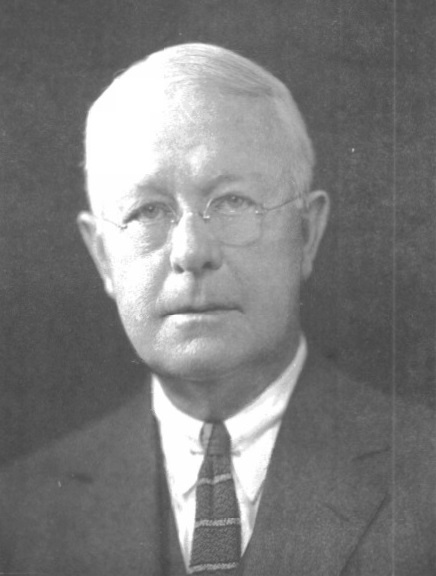

Member of the U.S. House of Representatives from New York's 28th district
- In office March 4, 1915 – March 3, 1921
- Preceded by: Peter G. Ten Eyck
- Succeeded by: Peter G. Ten Eyck

Personal details
- Born: May 18, 1874 Nicholville, New York, U.S.
- Died: May 16, 1957 (aged 82) Loudonville, New York, U.S.
- Cause of death: Struck by car
- Resting place: Albany Rural Cemetery, Menands, New York, U.S.
- Party: Republican
- Education: Albany Law School

Rollin Brewster Sanford (May 18, 1874 – May 16, 1957) was a U.S. representative from New York.

== Early life ==
Born in Nicholville, New York, to Henry T. Sanford (1840–1897) and Louisa Ann Brewster (c. 1841 – 1922), Sanford was raised in Albany and graduated from Albany High School in 1893. Sanford graduated from Tufts College in 1897. He received a law degree from Albany Law School in 1899, attained admission to the bar and commenced practice in Albany, New York.

== Career ==
He served as member of the New York National Guard from 1901 to 1906. In the early 1900s he was a member of the Albany Board of Aldermen. In 1908 Sanford was elected Albany County District Attorney and served until 1914.

Sanford was elected as a Republican to the Sixty-fourth, Sixty-fifth, and Sixty-sixth Congresses, serving from March 4, 1915, to March 3, 1921. He declined to be a candidate for reelection in 1920, and returned to practicing law. From 1921 to 1940 he served as member of the New York State Board of Law Examiners.

== Death and burial ==
In retirement Sanford resided in Loudonville, New York. He died there on May 16, 1957, after being struck by a motorist. He was interred in Albany Rural Cemetery, Menands, New York, Section 114, Lot 20.

== Family ==
Rollin B. Sanford was the great-grandson of Jonah Sanford. His son William K. Sanford served as Colonie Town Supervisor from 1950 to 1978.

== External resources ==
- United States Congress. "Rollin B. Sanford (id: S000053)". Biographical Directory of the United States Congress.
- Rollin Brewster Sanford at Find A Grave

U.S. House of Representatives
| Preceded by Peter G. Ten Eyck | Member of the U.S. House of Representatives from New York's 28th congressional district 1915–1921 | Succeeded by Peter G. Ten Eyck |
