= Frederick Whittlesey =

American politician

Member of the U.S. House of Representatives from New York
- In office March 4, 1831 – March 3, 1835
- Preceded by: Timothy Childs
- Succeeded by: Timothy Childs
- Constituency: 27th district (1831–1833); 29th district (1833–1835)

Frederick Whittlesey (June 12, 1799 – September 19, 1851) was a U.S. representative from New York, cousin of Elisha Whittlesey and Thomas Tucker Whittlesey.

Born in New Preston, Connecticut, Whittlesey pursued academic studies. He graduated from Yale College in 1818 where he studied law. He was admitted to the bar in Utica, New York, in 1821 and commenced practice in Cooperstown, New York, early in 1822. Later in the year, he moved to Rochester, New York where he became Treasurer of Monroe County in 1829 and 1830.

Whittlesey was elected as an Anti-Masonic candidate to the Twenty-second and Twenty-third Congresses (March 4, 1831 – March 3, 1835). He served as chairman of the Committee on Expenditures in the Department of War (Twenty-third Congress) before resuming the practice of law. Whittlesey served as the City Attorney of Rochester in 1838 and as vice chancellor of the eighth judicial district of New York from 1839 to 1847. He became justice of the State supreme court in 1847 and 1848 and then a professor of law at Genesee College (now Syracuse University) in 1850 and 1851. He was also Vice President of the University of Rochester. He died of typhus fever in Rochester, New York, September 19, 1851 and was interred in Mount Hope Cemetery.

U.S. House of Representatives
Preceded by Timothy Childs	Member of the U.S. House of Representatives from New York's 27th congressional district 1831–1833	Succeeded by Edward Howell
Preceded by Grattan H. Wheeler	Member of the U.S. House of Representatives from New York's 28th congressional district 1833–1835	Succeeded by Timothy Childs
