= John L. Schoolcraft =

American politician

John Lawrence Schoolcraft
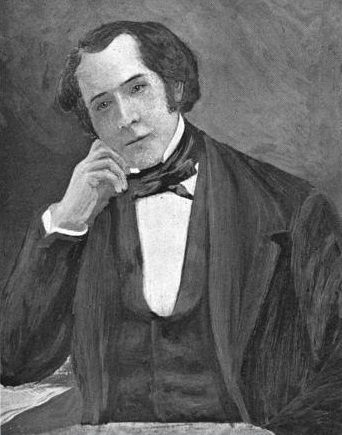
- John L. Schoolcraft, Congressman from New York

Member of the U.S. House of Representatives from New York's 13th district
- In office March 4, 1849 – March 3, 1853
- Preceded by: John I. Slingerland
- Succeeded by: Russell Sage

Personal details
- Born: September 22, 1806 Guilderland, New York, U.S.
- Died: June 7, 1860 (aged 53) St. Catharines, Province of Canada
- Resting place: Albany Rural Cemetery, Menands, New York, U.S.
- Party: Republican
- Other political affiliations: Whig
- Relatives: Henry Rowe Schoolcraft (uncle)

John Lawrence Schoolcraft (September 22, 1806 – June 7, 1860) was a U.S. representative from New York.

== Biography ==
John L. Schoolcraft was born in Guilderland, New York on September 22, 1806. His father died when he was three months old, and Schoolcraft's mother remarried and moved to Michigan. He remained in Guilderland, where he was raised by his grandparents.

The Schoolcrafts owned a large farm in Guilderland (over 1,000 acres) and ran a tavern and hotel on the Great Western Turnpike (now Western Avenue).

Schoolcraft was educated in the schools of Guilderland. At age 18 Schoolcraft's application to the United States Military Academy was rejected. As a result, he moved to Albany and began a business and banking career. He operated a wholesale grocery business and was active in the Albany and Cohoes and New York Central Railroads, and several other enterprises.

In the 1830s Schoolcraft became active in the Whig Party. He was a member of the New York Whig Central Committee and was a delegate to several local and state party conventions. As a result of these activities, Schoolcraft became a close confidant of William H. Seward and Thurlow Weed.

Schoolcraft was elected as a Whig to the Thirty-first Congress, succeeding John I. Slingerland by defeating candidates of the Democratic and Free Soil parties. He was re-elected to the Thirty-second Congress, defeating Democrat Erastus Corning. He represented New York's 13th congressional district from March 4, 1849, to March 3, 1853, and was not a candidate for renomination in 1852. He was succeeded by Russell Sage.

In 1853 Schoolcraft married Caroline Cornelia Canfield (1834-1922), the niece of William H. Seward. Weed served as a witness.

Active in banking as an incorporator of the Albany City Bank and an officer of the Commercial Bank of Albany, New York (now Key Bank), he was named President of the Commercial Bank in 1854 and served until his death.

He became a Republican when the party was founded in the mid-1850s, and was a delegate to the 1860 Republican National Convention.

== Death and burial ==
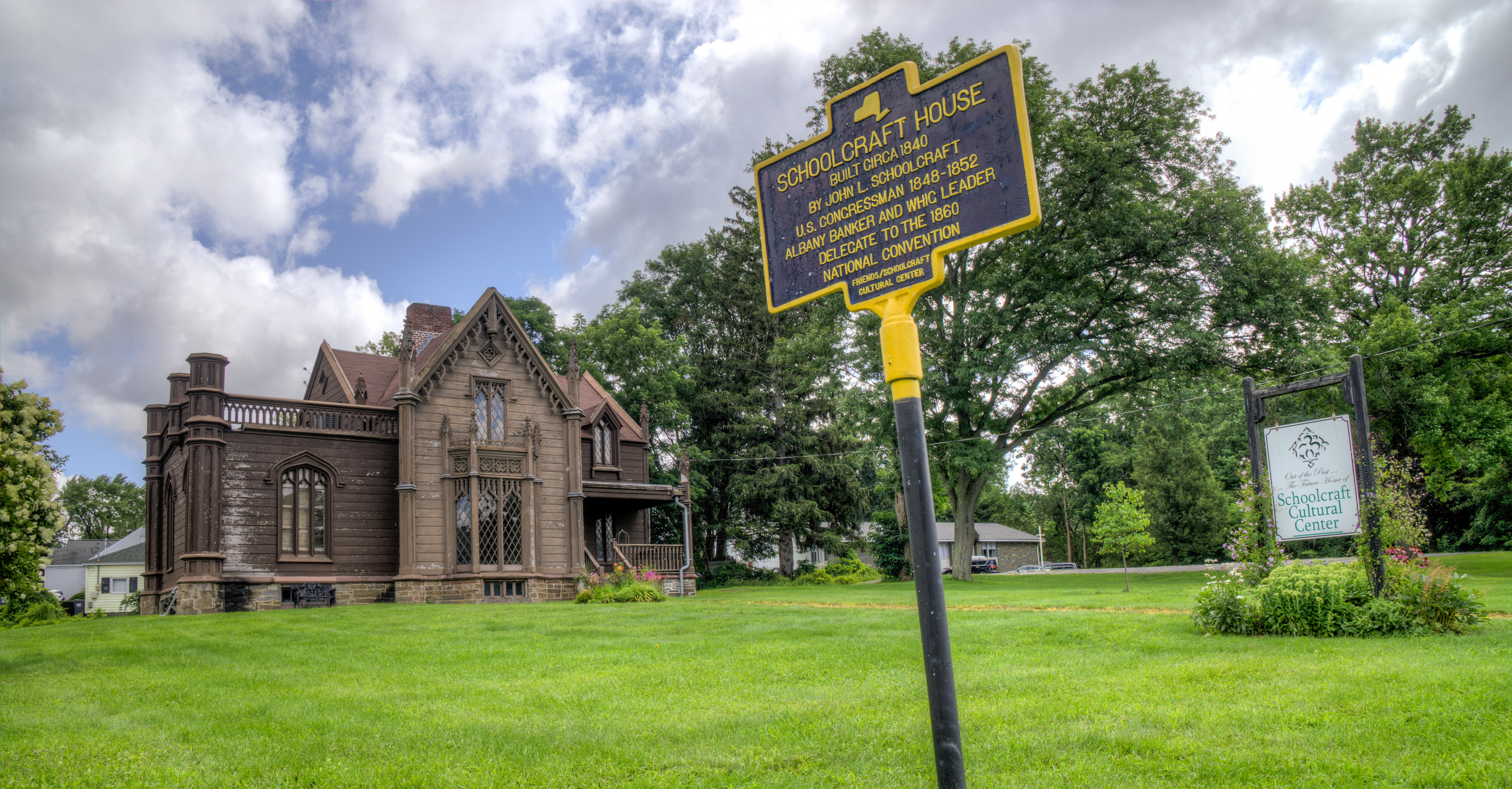
John Schoolcraft House, aka "Schoolcraft Cultural Center."

Schoolcraft became ill and died in St. Catharines in the Province of Canada (in what is now modern-day Ontario) on June 7, 1860, while returning from the Republican convention in Chicago.

He was interred in Albany Rural Cemetery.

== Legacy ==
His home in Guilderland, the John Schoolcraft House, was listed on the National Register of Historic Places in 1982. It is owned by the town of Guilderland.

== Sources ==
U.S. House of Representatives
Preceded by John I. Slingerland	Member of the U.S. House of Representatives from New York's 13th congressional district March 4, 1849 – March 3, 1853	Succeeded by Russell Sage
