= Northrup-Gilbert House =

Historic house in New York, United States

- U.S. National Register of Historic Places
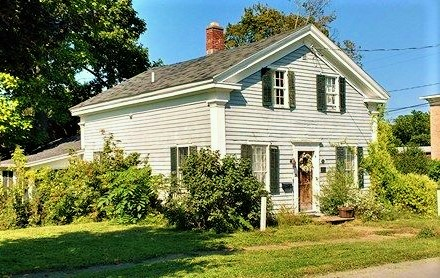

- Location within New York Location within the United States
- Location: 25 Church St., Phoenix, New York
- Coordinates: 43°13′43″N 76°17′49″W
- Area: less than one acre
- Built: 1840
- Architectural style: Greek Revival
- NRHP reference No.: 00000049
- Added to NRHP: February 4, 2000

The Northrup-Gilbert House is a historic home located at Phoenix in Oswego County, New York. It is a 1 1/2-story frame residence that appears to have been built in the 1840s. It has Greek Revival–style details.

It was listed on the National Register of Historic Places in 2000.
