= Daniel Morris =

American politician

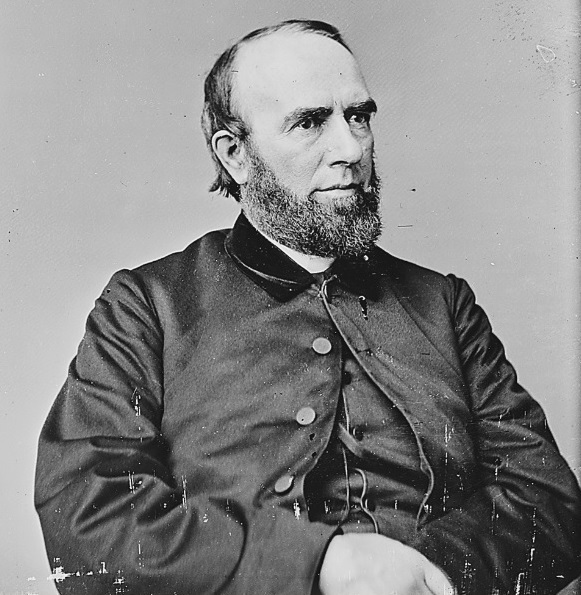
- Morris, c. 1863

Member of the New York Assembly for Yates County
- In office January 1, 1859 – December 31, 1859
- Preceded by: John Mather
- Succeeded by: George R. Barden

Member of the U.S. House of Representatives from New York's 25th district
- In office March 4, 1863 – March 3, 1867
- Preceded by: Theodore M. Pomeroy
- Succeeded by: William H. Kelsey

Personal details
- Born: January 4, 1812 Fayette, New York, USA
- Died: April 22, 1889 (aged 77) Penn Yan, New York, USA
- Resting place: Lake View Cemetery
- Party: Republican

Daniel Morris (January 4, 1812 – April 22, 1889) was a U.S. representative from New York during the American Civil War.

== Biography ==
Morris was born in Fayette, New York on January 4, 1812. He attended the public schools and the Canandaigua Academy in Ontario County, New York. Morris farmed and taught school before deciding on a legal career. He studied law, was admitted to the bar in 1845 and commenced practice in Penn Yan, New York.

Morris was active in politics as a Free Soil (anti-slavery) Democrat, and served as District Attorney of Yates County from 1847 to 1850. He was a member of the New York State Assembly (Yates Co.) in 1859.

Morris became a Republican when the party was founded in the 1850s and served as chairman of the party in Yates County. At the start of the American Civil War, he joined with pro-Union Democrats to organize unity rallies and recruiting drives.

He was elected as a congressman to the 38th and 39th Congresses (March 4, 1863 – March 3, 1867). He was not a candidate for reelection in 1866 and resumed the practice of law.

He died in Penn Yan, New York on April 22, 1889, and was interred in Lake View Cemetery.

New York State Assembly
Preceded by John Mather	New York State Assembly; Yates County; 1859	Succeeded by George R. Barden
U.S. House of Representatives
Preceded by Theodore M. Pomeroy	Member of the U.S. House of Representatives from New York's 25th congressional district 1863 – 1867	Succeeded by William H. Kelsey
