= New York's 28th congressional district =

Former congressional united States House representative

- Obsolete district
- Created: 1820
- Eliminated: 2010
- Years active: 1823-2013

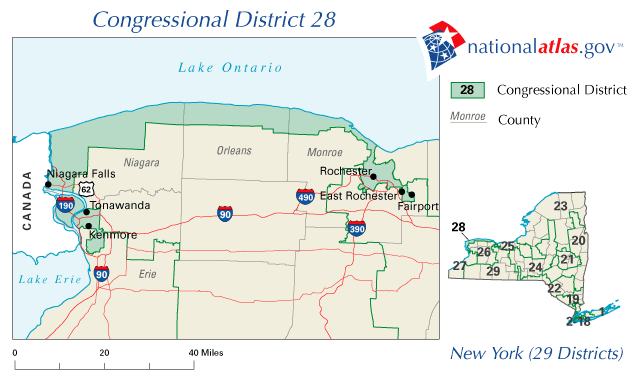
The district from 2003 to 2013

New York’s 28th congressional district is an obsolete congressional district for the United States House of Representatives. Before becoming obsolete in 2013, the district was based in Rochester, Buffalo, and Niagara Falls, and included parts of Erie, Monroe, Niagara and Orleans Counties. Its easternmost point was in Fairport at the home of its final representative, Democrat Louise Slaughter. Due to its gerrymandered shape it was sometimes known as "the earmuffs."

After congressional district lines were redrawn to accommodate the loss of the seat due to reapportionment as a result of the 2010 census, the "earmuffs" were dismantled. The western portion of the present 28th district became part of the new 27th district and the eastern portion of the 28th comprised the majority of the new 25th district, which is contained entirely in Monroe County.

== Voting ==
Election results from presidential races
Year	Office	Results
1992	President	Clinton 44–38%
1996	President	Clinton 55–36%
2000	President	Gore 60–35%
2004	President	Kerry 63–36%
2008	President	Obama 69–30%

== History ==
2003–2013:

Parts of Erie, Monroe, Niagara, Orleans

1993–2003:

Parts of Monroe

1983–1993:

All of Broome, Tioga, Ulster
Parts of Delaware, Sullivan, Tompkins

1973–1983:

Parts of Albany, Montgomery, Schenectady

1971–1973:

All of Columbia, Delaware, Greene, Otsego, Schoharie, Ulster
Parts of Duchess, Montgomery, Sullivan

1963–1971:

All of Columbia, Duchess, Greene, Schoharie, Ulster

1953–1963:

All of Delaware, Orange, Rockland, Sullivan

1945–1953:

Parts of Westchester

1913–1945:

All of Albany
Parts of Rensselaer

== List of members representing the district ==
Representative	Party	Years	Cong ress	Electoral history
District established March 4, 1823
William B. Rochester (Bath)	Crawford D-R	March 4, 1823 – April 21, 1823	18th	Redistricted from 20th district and re-elected in 1822. Resigned upon appointment as Judge of the Eighth Circuit Court.
Vacant		April 21, 1823 – December 1, 1823	18th	
William Woods (Bath)	Adams-Clay DR	December 1, 1823 – March 3, 1825	18th	Elected to finish Rochester's term.
Timothy H. Porter (Olean)	Adams	March 4, 1825 – March 3, 1827	19th	Elected in 1824. Did not run for reelection.
John Magee (Bath)	Jacksonian	March 4, 1827 – March 3, 1831	20th 21st	Elected in 1826. Re-elected in 1828. Unsuccessful candidate for reelection.
Grattan H. Wheeler (Wheeler)	Anti-Masonic	March 4, 1831 – March 3, 1833	22nd	Elected in 1830. Did not run for reelection.
Frederick Whittlesey (Rochester)	Anti-Masonic	March 4, 1833 – March 3, 1835	23rd	Redistricted from 27th district and re-elected in 1832.
Timothy Childs (Rochester)	Anti-Jacksonian	March 4, 1835 – March 3, 1837	24th 25th	Elected in 1834.
Timothy Childs (Rochester)	Whig	March 4, 1837 – March 3, 1839	24th 25th	Re-elected in 1836. Did not run for reelection.
Thomas Kempshall (Rochester)	Whig	March 4, 1839 – March 3, 1841	26th	Elected in 1838. Did not run for reelection.
Timothy Childs (Rochester)	Whig	March 4, 1841 – March 3, 1843	27th	Elected in 1840. Did not run for reelection.
Thomas J. Paterson (Rochester)	Whig	March 4, 1843 – March 3, 1845	28th	Elected in 1842. Did not run for reelection.
Elias B. Holmes (Brockport)	Whig	March 4, 1845 – March 3, 1849	29th 30th	Elected in 1844. Re-elected in 1846. Did not run for reelection.
Abraham M. Schermerhorn (Rochester)	Whig	March 4, 1849 – March 3, 1853	31st 32nd	Elected in 1848. Re-elected in 1850. Did not run for reelection.
George Hastings (Mount Morris)	Democratic	March 4, 1853 – March 3, 1855	33rd	Elected in 1852. Did not run for reelection.
William H. Kelsey (Geneseo)	Opposition	March 4, 1855 – March 3, 1857	34th 35th	Elected in 1854.
William H. Kelsey (Geneseo)	Republican	March 4, 1857 – March 3, 1859	34th 35th	Elected in 1856. Did not run for reelection.
William Irvine (Corning)	Republican	March 4, 1859 – March 3, 1861	36th	Elected in 1858. Did not run for reelection.
Robert B. Van Valkenburgh (Bath)	Republican	March 4, 1861 – March 3, 1863	37th	Elected in 1860. Redistricted to 27th district.
Freeman Clarke (Rochester)	Republican	March 4, 1863 – March 3, 1865	38th	Elected in 1862. Did not run for reelection.
Roswell Hart (Rochester)	Republican	March 4, 1865 – March 3, 1867	39th	Elected in 1864. Unsuccessful candidate for reelection.
Lewis Selye (Rochester)	Ind. Republican	March 4, 1867 – March 3, 1869	40th	Elected in 1866. Did not run for reelection.
Noah Davis (Albion)	Republican	March 4, 1869 – July 15, 1870	41st	Elected in 1868. Resigned after becoming United States Attorney for the Southern District of New York.
Vacant		July 16, 1870 – December 5, 1870	41st	
Charles H. Holmes (Albion)	Republican	December 6, 1870 – March 3, 1871	41st	Elected to finish Davis's term.
Freeman Clarke (Rochester)	Republican	March 4, 1871 – March 3, 1873	42nd	Elected in 1870. Redistricted to 29th district.
Horace B. Smith (Elmira)	Republican	March 4, 1873 – March 3, 1875	43rd	Redistricted from 27th district and re-elected in 1872.
Thomas C. Platt (Owego)	Republican	March 4, 1875 – March 3, 1877	44th	Redistricted from 27th district and re-elected in 1874.
Jeremiah W. Dwight (Dryden)	Republican	March 4, 1877 – March 3, 1883	45th 46th 47th	Elected in 1876. Re-elected in 1878. Re-elected in 1880. Did not run for reelection.
Stephen C. Millard (Binghamton)	Republican	March 4, 1883 – March 3, 1885	48th	Elected in 1882. Redistricted to 26th district.
John Arnot Jr. (Elmira)	Democratic	March 4, 1885 – November 20, 1886	49th	redistricted from 29th district and re-elected in 1884. Died.
Vacant		November 21, 1886 – March 3, 1887	49th	
Thomas S. Flood (Elmira)	Republican	March 4, 1887 – March 3, 1891	50th 51st	Elected in 1886. Re-elected in 1888. Did not run for reelection.
Hosea H. Rockwell (Elmira)	Democratic	March 4, 1891 – March 3, 1893	52nd	Elected in 1890. Did not run for reelection.
Sereno E. Payne (Auburn)	Republican	March 4, 1893 – March 3, 1903	53rd 54th 55th 56th 57th	Redistricted from 27th district and re-elected in 1892. Re-elected in 1894. Re-elected in 1896. Re-elected in 1898. Re-elected in 1900. Redistricted to 31st district.
Charles L. Knapp (Lowville)	Republican	March 4, 1903 – March 3, 1911	58th 59th 60th 61st	Redistricted from 24th district and re-elected in 1902. Re-elected in 1904. Re-elected in 1906. Re-elected in 1908.
Luther W. Mott (Oswego)	Republican	March 4, 1911 – March 3, 1913	62nd	Elected in 1910. Redistricted to 32nd district.
Peter G. Ten Eyck (Albany)	Democratic	March 4, 1913 – March 3, 1915	63rd	Elected in 1912. Unsuccessful candidate for reelection.
Rollin B. Sanford (Albany)	Republican	March 4, 1915 – March 3, 1921	64th 65th 66th	Elected in 1914. Re-elected in 1916. Re-elected in 1918. Did not run for reelection.
Peter G. Ten Eyck (Albany)	Democratic	March 4, 1921 – March 3, 1923	67th	Elected in 1920. Did not run for reelection.
Parker Corning (Albany)	Democratic	March 4, 1923 – January 3, 1937	68th 69th 70th 71st 72nd 73rd 74th	Elected in 1922. Re-elected in 1924. Re-elected in 1926. Re-elected in 1928. Re-elected in 1930. Re-elected in 1932. Re-elected in 1934. Retired.
William T. Byrne (Loudonville)	Democratic	January 3, 1937 – January 3, 1945	75th 76th 77th 78th	Elected in 1936. Re-elected in 1938. Re-elected in 1940. Re-elected in 1942. Redistricted to 32nd district.
Ralph A. Gamble (Larchmont)	Republican	January 3, 1945 – January 3, 1953	79th 80th 81st 82nd	Redistricted from 25th district and re-elected in 1944. Re-elected in 1946. Re-elected in 1948. Re-elected in 1950. Redistricted to 26th district.
Katharine St. George (Tuxedo Park)	Republican	January 3, 1953 – January 3, 1963	83rd 84th 85th 86th 87th	Redistricted from 29th district and re-elected in 1952. Re-elected in 1954. Re-elected in 1956. Re-elected in 1958. Re-elected in 1960. Redistricted to 27th district.
J. Ernest Wharton (Richmondville)	Republican	January 3, 1963 – January 3, 1965	88th	Redistricted from 29th district and re-elected in 1962.
Joseph Y. Resnick (Ellenville)	Democratic	January 3, 1965 – January 3, 1969	89th 90th	Elected in 1964. Re-elected in 1966. Unsuccessful candidate for Democratic U.S. Senate nomination.
Hamilton Fish IV (Millbrook)	Republican	January 3, 1969 – January 3, 1973	91st 92nd	Elected in 1968. Re-elected in 1970. Redistricted to 25th district.
Samuel S. Stratton (Amsterdam)	Democratic	January 3, 1973 – January 3, 1983	93rd 94th 95th 96th 97th	Redistricted from 29th district and re-elected in 1972. Re-elected in 1974. Re-elected in 1976. Re-elected in 1978. Re-elected in 1980. Redistricted to 23rd district
Matthew F. McHugh (Ithaca)	Democratic	January 3, 1983 – January 3, 1993	98th 99th 100th 101st 102nd	Redistricted from 27th district and re-elected in 1982. Re-elected in 1984. Re-elected in 1986. Re-elected in 1988. Re-elected in 1990. Redistricted to 26th district and retired.
Louise Slaughter (Fairport)	Democratic	January 3, 1993 – January 3, 2013	103rd 104th 105th 106th 107th 108th 109th 110th 111th 112th	Redistricted from 30th district and re-elected in 1992. Re-elected in 1994. Re-elected in 1996. Re-elected in 1998. Re-elected in 2000. Re-elected in 2002. Re-elected in 2004. Re-elected in 2006. Re-elected in 2008. Re-elected in 2010. Redistricted to 25th district.
District dissolved January 3, 2013

The 28th District has included all or part of Rochester since 1992. The 2002 remap added parts of Buffalo and Niagara Falls. In the 1980s the 28th District was the southern tier seat now numbered the 22nd District. In the 1970s it was the Capitol District seat now numbered the 21st District. During the 1960s it was a Hudson Valley/Catskill seat including much of the present 19th District and parts of the 20th and 22nd District.

Prior to 1992 the Rochester area district was the 30th. Monroe County was split between two districts in the 1970s, the 34th District (which included much of the present 25th District) and the 35th District (which included much of the present 26th District).

== Election results ==
Note that in New York State electoral politics there are numerous minor parties at various points on the political spectrum. Certain parties will invariably endorse either the Republican or Democratic candidate for every office, hence the state electoral results contain both the party votes, and the final candidate votes (Listed as "Recap").

US House election, 2006: New York District 28
Party	Candidate	Votes	%	±%
Democratic	Louise Slaughter (incumbent)	111,386	73.2	+0.6
Republican	John E. Donnelly	40,844	26.8	+2.0
Majority		70,542	46.3	−1.5
Turnout		152,230	100	−30.8

US House election, 2004: New York District 28
Party	Candidate	Votes	%	±%
Democratic	Louise Slaughter (incumbent)	159,655	72.6	+10.1
Republican	Mike Laba	54,543	24.8	−12.7
Independence	Francina Cartonia	5,678	2.6	+2.6
Majority		105,112	47.8	+22.9
Turnout		219,876	100	+38.6

US House election, 2002: New York District 28
Party	Candidate	Votes	%	±%
Democratic	Louise Slaughter (incumbent)	99,057	62.5	−3.2
Republican	Henry F. Wojtaszek	59,547	37.5	+4.9
Majority		39,510	24.9	−8.2
Turnout		158,604	100	−31.3

US House election, 2000: New York District 28
Party	Candidate	Votes	%	±%
Democratic	Louise Slaughter (incumbent)	151,688	65.7	+0.9
Republican	Mark C. Johns	75,348	32.6	+1.8
Green	Eve Hawkins	2,292	1.0	+1.0
Libertarian	Stephen C. Healey	1,528	0.7	+0.7
Majority		76,340	33.1	−0.9
Turnout		230,856	100	+25.8

US House election, 1998: New York District 28
Party	Candidate	Votes	%	±%
Democratic	Louise Slaughter (incumbent)	118,856	64.8	+7.5
Republican	Richard A. Kaplan	56,443	30.8	−11.9
Conservative	Paul Britton	4,963	2.7	+2.7
Right to Life	Gerald D. Crawford	3,196	1.7	+1.7
Majority		62,413	34.0	+19.5
Turnout		183,458	100	−21.1

US House election, 1996: New York District 28
Party	Candidate	Votes	%	±%
Democratic	Louise Slaughter (incumbent)	133,084	57.3	
Republican	Geoff H. Rosenberger	99,366	42.7	
Majority		33,718	14.5	
Turnout		232,450	100	

== See also ==
- 2012 added
  - Florida 26
  - Florida 27
  - Texas 33
  - Texas 34
  - Texas 35
  - Texas 36
  - Georgia 14
  - Washington 10
  - South Carolina 7
  - Utah 4
  - Nevada 4
  - Arizona 9
- 2012 eliminated
  - New York 28
  - New York 29
  - Illinois 19
  - Pennsylvania 19
  - Ohio 17
  - Ohio 18
  - Michigan 15
  - New Jersey 13
  - Massachusetts 10
  - Missouri 9
  - Louisiana 7
  - Iowa 5
