= St. John's Episcopal Church (Phoenix, New York) =

Historic church in New York, United States

- U.S. National Register of Historic Places
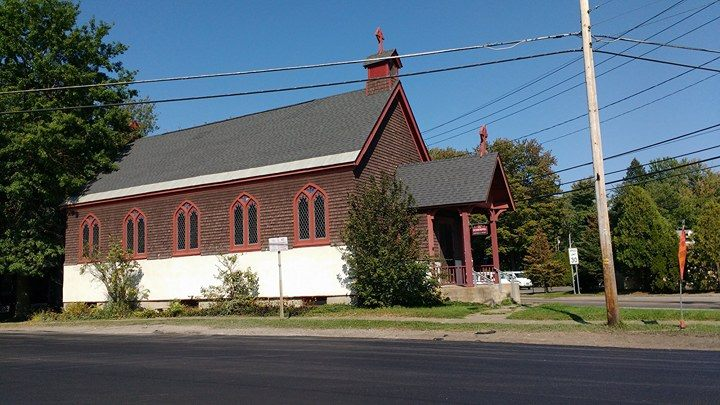

- Location within New York Location within the United States
- Location: 670 Main St. Phoenix, New York
- Coordinates: 43°13′53″N 76°18′4″W
- Area: 2 acres (0.81 ha)
- Built: 1911
- Architect: Rudd, Rev. Arthur B.
- Architectural style: Late Gothic Revival
- NRHP reference No.: 93000442
- Added to NRHP: May 27, 1993

St. John's Episcopal Church is a historic Episcopal church located at Phoenix in Oswego County, New York. It is a small frame Gothic Revival style structure built in 1911.

It was listed on the National Register of Historic Places in 1993.

It has been the home of the Schroeppel Historical Society since the 1980s.
