= Thomas Kempshall =

American politician (c.1796–1865)

4th Mayor of Rochester, New York
- In office March 1837 – 1838
- Preceded by: Abraham M. Schermerhorn
- Succeeded by: Elisha Johnson

Member of the U.S. House of Representatives from New York's 28th district
- In office March 4, 1839 – March 3, 1841
- Preceded by: Timothy Childs
- Succeeded by: Timothy Childs

Personal details
- Born: c. 1796 England, Kingdom of Great Britain
- Died: January 14, 1865 (aged 68–69) Rochester, New York, U.S.
- Party: Whig
- Profession: Miller

Thomas Kempshall (c. 1796 – January 14, 1865) was a U.S. representative from New York.

Born in England around 1796, Kempshall attended the common schools. He immigrated to the United States with his father, who settled in Pittsford, New York, in 1806. He moved to Rochester, New York, in 1813, where he was employed as a carpenter. He engaged in mercantile pursuits and later became engaged in milling.

He served as a member of the board of aldermen of Rochester, New York, in 1834 and again in 1844, serving as mayor in 1837. He was an unsuccessful candidate for mayor in 1852.

Kempshall was elected as a Whig to the Twenty-Sixth Congress (March 4, 1839 – March 3, 1841).

He died in Rochester, New York, on January 14, 1865, aged about 69 years. He was interred in Mount Hope Cemetery.

== Sources ==
- United States Congress. "Thomas Kempshall (id: K000087)". Biographical Directory of the United States Congress.

Political offices
Preceded by Abraham M. Schermerhorn	Mayor of Rochester, NY; March 1837-1838	Succeeded by Elisha Johnson
U.S. House of Representatives
Preceded by Timothy Childs	Member of the U.S. House of Representatives from New York's 28th congressional district 1839–1841	Succeeded by Timothy Childs
