= Luther W. Mott =

American politician

Luther Wright Mott
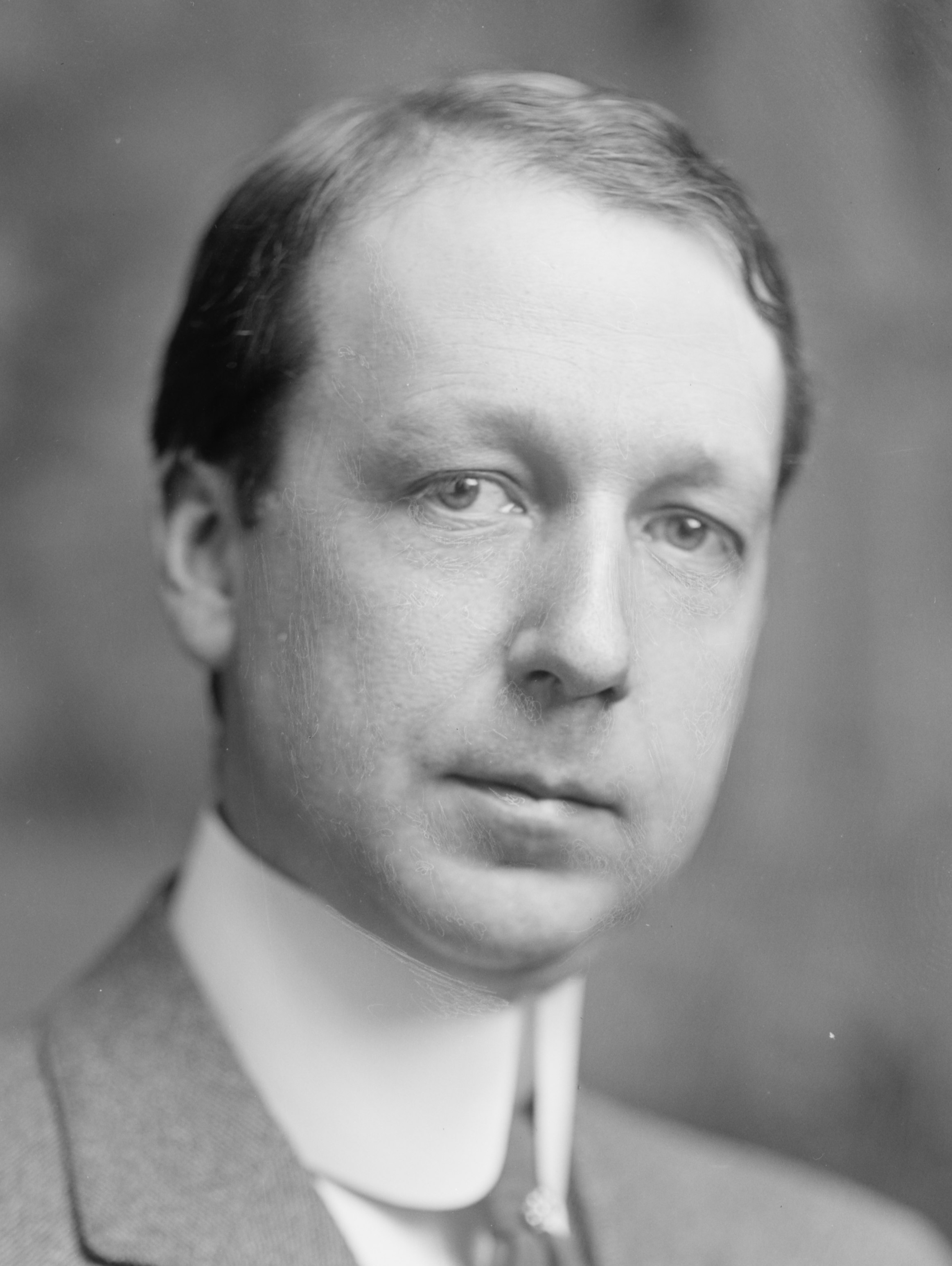

Member of the U.S. House of Representatives from New York
- In office March 4, 1911 – July 10, 1923
- Preceded by: Charles L. Knapp
- Succeeded by: Thaddeus C. Sweet
- Constituency: 28th district (1911–13); 32nd district (1913–23)

Personal details
- Born: November 30, 1874 Oswego, New York, US
- Died: July 10, 1923 (aged 48) Oswego, New York, US
- Party: Republican
- Education: Harvard University
- Occupation: Banker

Luther Wright Mott (November 30, 1874 – July 10, 1923) was a United States representative from New York.

Born in Oswego, he attended the public schools and graduated from Harvard University in 1896.

Mott began his career at the First National Bank of Oswego, which was owned by his family, and he eventually became the bank's cashier and vice president. He was a founder of the Oswego Chamber of Commerce, created by merging two other organizations, and he served as its president.

A civic activist, Mott was a trustee of the Presbyterian church he attended, the public library in Oswego, and Oswego's Home for the Homeless and Orphan Asylum.

In 1907 Mott was appointed state Banking Commissioner, but served just five days before resigning on the grounds of ill health.

He was a delegate to the 1908 Republican National Convention and he was president of the New York State Bankers' Association from 1910 until 1911.

Mott was elected as a Republican to the Sixty-Second and to the six succeeding Congresses and served from March 4, 1911 until his death in Oswego in 1923. During his service in Congress Mott advocated women's suffrage and prohibition.

During World War I Mott organized of the 9th Division of the New York Naval Militia in Oswego. He also aided in the organization of a division in Fulton.

Mott died in Oswego on July 10, 1923. He was buried at Riverside Cemetery in Oswego.

== Family ==
In 1902 Mott married Ruth Woolsey Johnson of Oswego. They had three children: Luther W., Jr.; Alice Wright; and Dorothy J.

After Mott's death his widow was appointed as Oswego's postmaster.

== See also ==
- List of members of the United States Congress who died in office (1900–1949)

U.S. House of Representatives
Preceded by Charles L. Knapp	Member of the U.S. House of Representatives from New York's 28th congressional district 1911–1913	Succeeded by Peter G. Ten Eyck
Preceded by Henry G. Danforth	Member of the U.S. House of Representatives from New York's 32nd congressional district 1913–1923	Succeeded by Thaddeus C. Sweet
