= William H. Kelsey =

American politician (1812–1879)

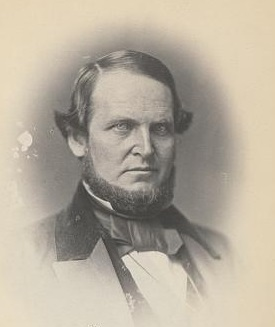

Member of the U.S. House of Representatives from New York's 25th district
- In office March 4, 1867 – March 3, 1871
- Preceded by: Daniel Morris
- Succeeded by: William H. Lamport

Member of the U.S. House of Representatives from New York's 28th district
- In office March 4, 1855 – March 3, 1859
- Preceded by: George Hastings
- Succeeded by: William Irvine

Personal details
- Born: William Henry Kelsey; October 2, 1812 Smyrna, New York, U.S.
- Died: April 20, 1879 (aged 66) Geneseo, New York, U.S.
- Resting place: Temple Hill Cemetery
- Party: Republican
- Other political affiliations: Whig
- Relatives: Edwin B. Kelsey (brother); Charles S. Kelsey (brother); Otto Kelsey (nephew)
- Profession: Politician, lawyer

William Henry Kelsey (October 2, 1812 – April 20, 1879) was a U.S. Representative from New York.

Born in Smyrna, New York, Kelsey attended the common schools. He studied law and was admitted to the bar in 1843 and commenced practice in Geneseo, New York. He was the Surrogate of Livingston County 1840–1844 and served as district attorney of Livingston County 1850–1853.

Kelsey was elected as a Whig candidate to the Thirty-fourth Congress, and reelected as a Republican to the Thirty-fifth Congress (March 4, 1855 – March 3, 1859). He served as chairman of the Committee on Engraving (Thirty-fourth Congress). He was not a candidate for renomination in 1858 to the Thirty-sixth Congress. He resumed the practice of his profession.

Kelsey was elected as a Republican to the Fortieth and Forty-first Congresses (March 4, 1867 – March 3, 1871). He voluntarily retired from political life and resumed the practice of law in Geneseo, New York, where he died on April 20, 1879. He was interred in Temple Hill Cemetery.

His brother was Edwin B. Kelsey, who was a lawyer, businessman, and Wisconsin state legislator. Another brother, Charles S. Kelsey, was also a Wisconsin legislator whose son, Otto Kelsey, was a New York legislator.

== Sources ==
- United States Congress. "William H. Kelsey (id: K000080)". Biographical Directory of the United States Congress.

U.S. House of Representatives
Preceded by George Hastings	Member of the U.S. House of Representatives from New York's 28th congressional district 1855–1859	Succeeded by William Irvine
Preceded by Daniel Morris	Member of the U.S. House of Representatives from New York's 25th congressional district 1867–1871	Succeeded by William H. Lamport
