= John Schoolcraft House =

Historic house in New York, United States

- U.S. National Register of Historic Places
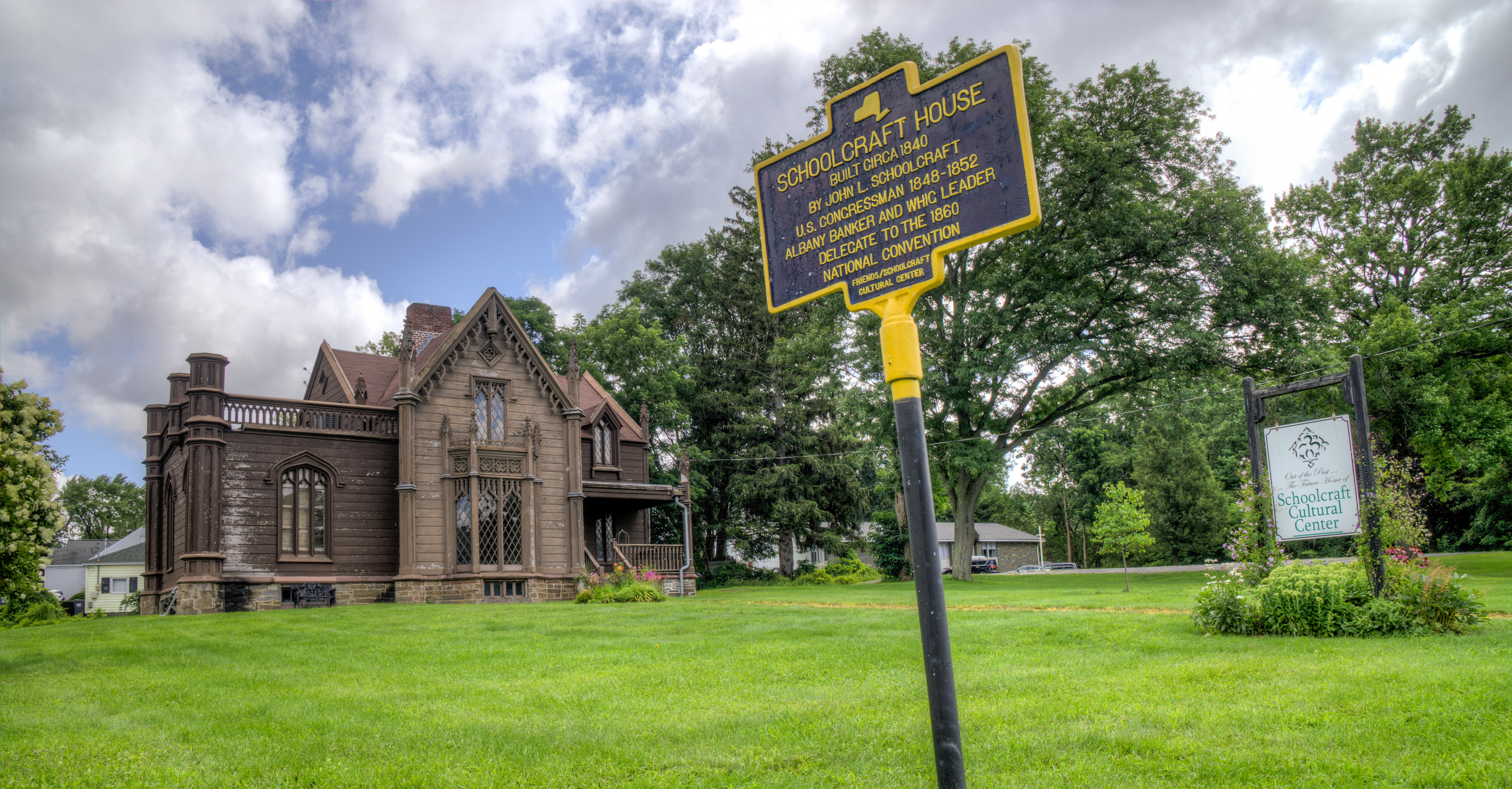
- Schoolcraft Cultural Center

- Location within New York Location within the United States
- Location: 2299 Western Ave., Guilderland, New York
- Coordinates: 42°42′14″N 73°54′36″W
- Area: 0.8 acres (0.32 ha)
- Built: 1835
- Architectural style: Gothic Revival
- MPS: Guilderland MRA
- NRHP reference No.: 82001081
- Added to NRHP: November 10, 1982

John Schoolcraft House is a historic home located at Guilderland in Albany County, New York.

== Description ==
The house was built about 1835 and is a distinctive Gothic Revival style dwelling. It features gingerbread vergeboards, pinnacles with crockets, lancet windows, and horizontal beaded siding.

The finials on the corners of the house are unique; the bases are made of wood, and the tips are of cast iron. The iron came from a foundry which Schoolcraft owned nearby. The house has 15 rooms with six fireplaces. The ballroom ceiling is decorated with plaster crown molding.

== History ==
The house was built for John L. Schoolcraft (1804–1860), U.S. Congressman and uncle of Henry Rowe Schoolcraft. Schoolcraft used the house as a summer home until he died in 1860 at age 52.

The house was listed on the National Register of Historic Places in 1982. The town purchased the property in 1994.

The town, together with Friends of the Schoolcraft Culture Center, renovated the house in stops and starts over a decade, as finances allowed. Around 2000, the exterior was renovated. The interior has been completely gutted and refitted with electricity, plumbing, heating, and climate controlled air conditioning, even a refrigerator and dishwasher.

A festive Holiday Event with over 200 guests was held in December 2014 to celebrate the restoration of the mansion. A portrait of Schoolcraft by artist Augusta Dudley was donated to the town and was expected to be installed in the house.

== Gallery ==
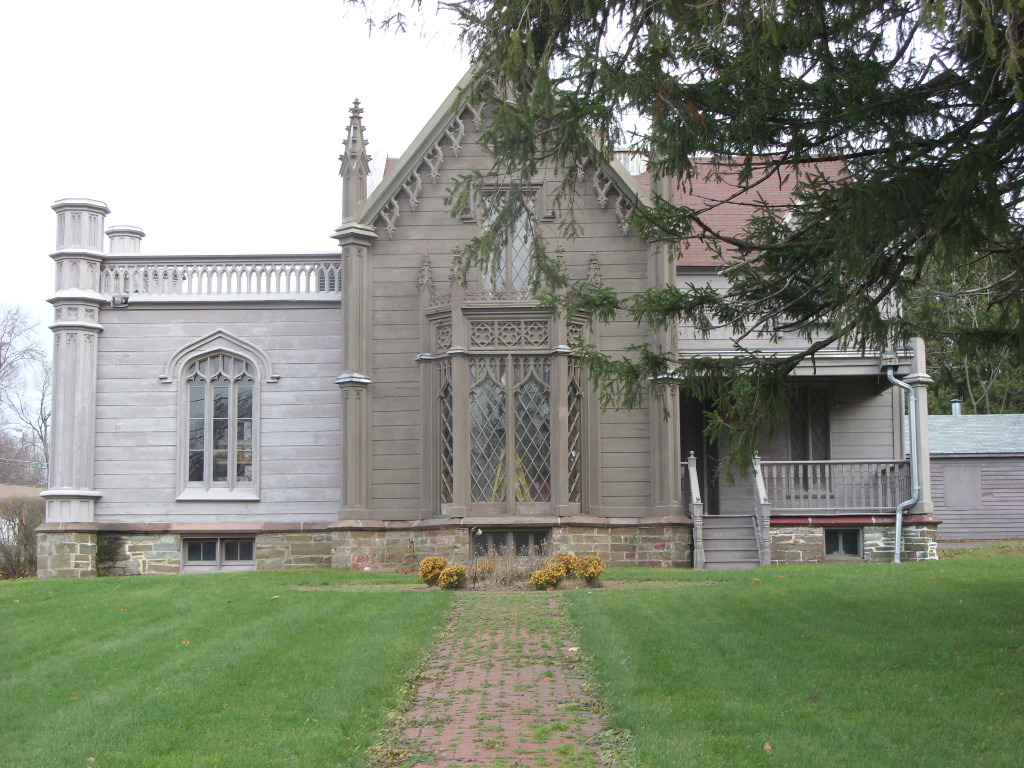
John Schoolcraft House, November 2008

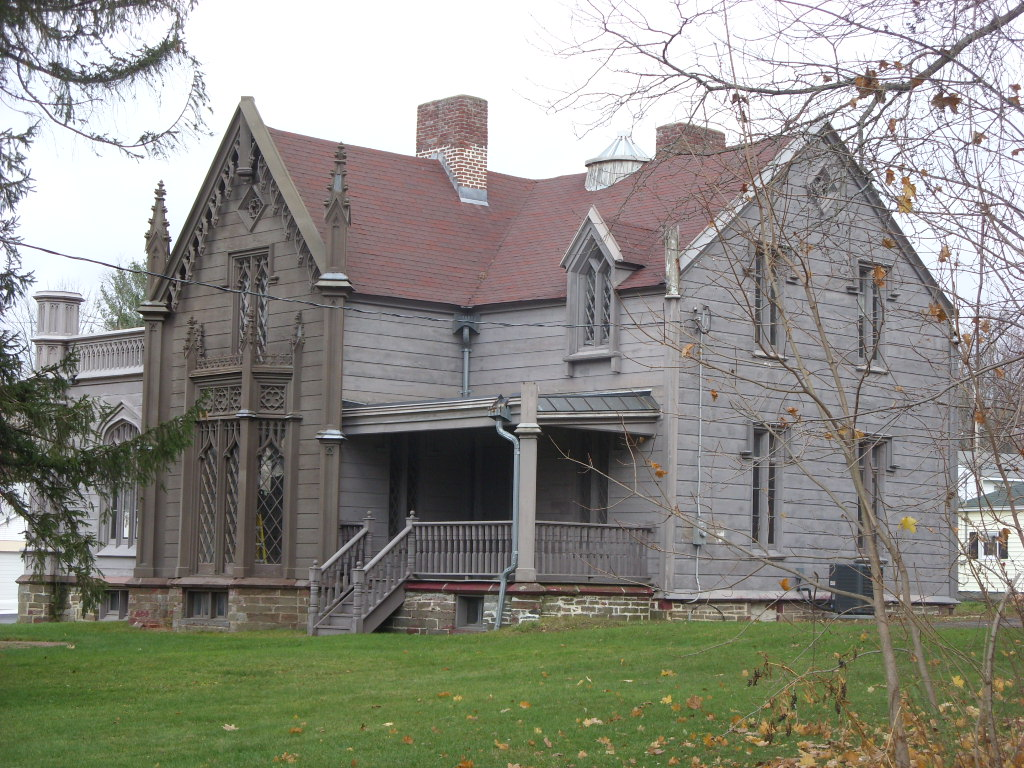
John Schoolcraft House, November 2008

== See also ==
- National Register of Historic Places listings in Albany County, New York
