= Thomas J. Paterson =

American politician

Thomas Jefferson Paterson
- Born: April 10, 1805; Lisle, New York
- Died: February 15, 1885 (aged 79)
- Office: Member of the U.S. House of Representatives
- Political party: Whig
- Relatives: Brother: State Senator John E. Paterson (born 1800)

Thomas Jefferson Paterson, sometimes misspelled Patterson, (April 10, 1805 – February 15, 1885), was a U.S. representative from New York.

Paterson was born in Lisle, New York, and attended public schools.

Paterson was elected as a Whig to the Twenty-Eighth Congress (March 4, 1843 – March 3, 1845). He was engaged as a land agent in Rochester, New York.

State Senator John E. Paterson (1800–1885) was his brother; Congressman John Paterson (1744–1808) and State Senator Caleb Hyde were his grandfathers.

U.S. House of Representatives
Preceded by Timothy Childs	Member of the U.S. House of Representatives from New York's 28th congressional district 1843–1845	Succeeded by Elias B. Holmes
