= George Hastings (American politician) =

American politician (1807–1866)

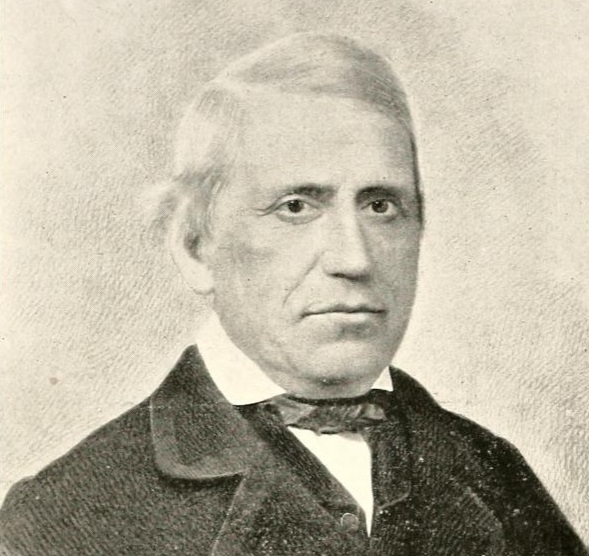

Member of the U.S. House of Representatives from New York's 28th district
- In office March 4, 1853 – March 3, 1855
- Preceded by: Abraham M. Schermerhorn
- Succeeded by: William H. Kelsey

Personal details
- Born: March 13, 1807 Clinton, Oneida County, New York, U.S.
- Died: August 29, 1866 (aged 59) Mount Morris, New York, U.S.
- Party: Democratic
- Spouse(s): Mary H. Seymour (m. 1832, died) Chloe A. Parmele (m. 1847)
- Education: Hamilton College
- Profession: Politician, lawyer, jurist

George Hastings (March 13, 1807 – August 29, 1866) was an American lawyer, jurist, and politician who served one term as a U.S. representative from New York from 1853 to 1855.

== Biography ==
Hastings was born in Clinton, New York and attended the public schools. He graduated in law in 1826 from Hamilton College in Clinton, New York. In 1830 he was admitted to the bar and commenced practice in Mount Morris, New York.

=== Family ===
Hastings married Mary H. Seymour in 1832 and in 1847, two years after being widowed, he married again this time to Chloe A. Parmele. He served as a district attorney from 1839 to 1848.

=== Congress ===
Hastings was elected as a Democrat to the Thirty-Third Congress(March 4, 1853 – March 3, 1855).

=== Later career and death ===
Hastings was elected judge of the county court of Livingston County and served from November 1855 until his death in Mount Morris, New York on August 29, 1866. He was interred in the city cemetery.

U.S. House of Representatives
Preceded by Abraham M. Schermerhorn	Member of the U.S. House of Representatives from New York's 28th congressional district 1853–1855	Succeeded by William H. Kelsey
