= John I. Slingerland =

American politician

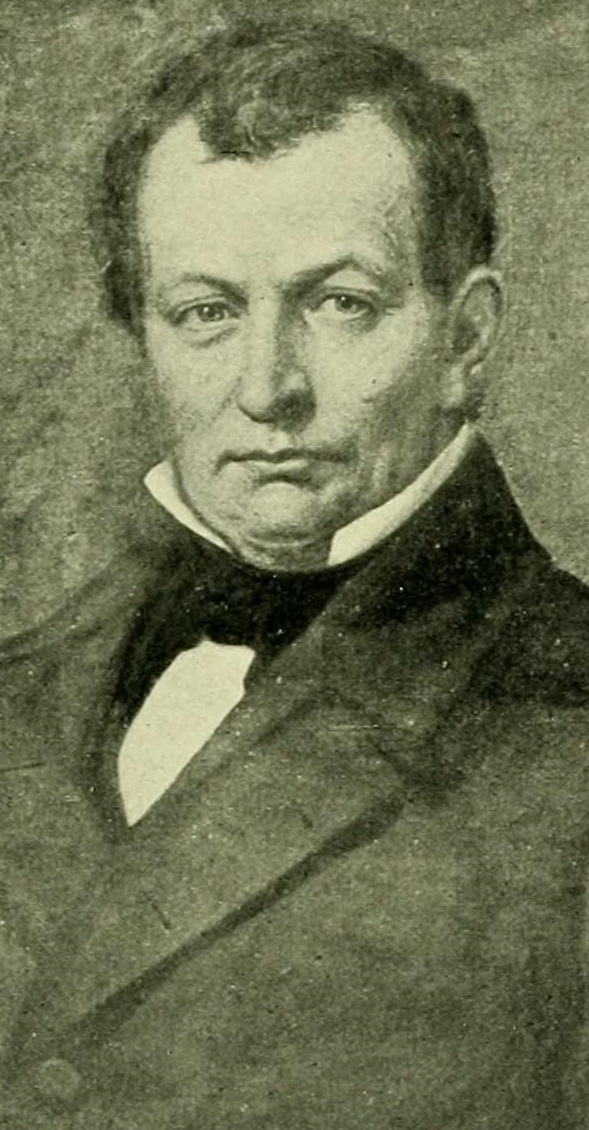
- From Part I of 1897's Landmarks of Albany County

Member of the U.S. House of Representatives from New York's 13th district
- In office March 4, 1847 – March 3, 1849
- Preceded by: Bradford R. Wood
- Succeeded by: John L. Schoolcraft

Member of the New York State Assembly
- In office 1860–1861
- Preceded by: Henry Creble
- Succeeded by: Jay Gibbons
- Constituency: Albany County's 1st District
- In office 1843–1844 Serving with Willis Hall, Aaron Van Schaack
- Preceded by: John Adams Dix, Cornelius G. Palmer, Jonas Shear
- Succeeded by: Levi Shaw, Samuel Stevens, Simon Veeder
- Constituency: Albany County

Personal details
- Born: March 1, 1804 Feura Bush, New York, U.S.
- Died: October 26, 1861 (aged 57) Slingerlands, New York, U.S.
- Resting place: Slingerland family mausoleum, Slingerlands, New York, U.S.
- Party: Whig (before 1855); Republican (after 1855)
- Occupation: Farmer; Businessman

John I. Slingerland (March 1, 1804 – October 26, 1861) was a New York farmer, businessman, and politician. He served terms in both the New York State Assembly and the United States House of Representatives.

A native and lifelong resident of Bethlehem, New York, Slingerland was educated in the schools of Bethlehem and became a successful farmer. He was also involved in several businesses, including the creation of a toll road that linked the hamlet of Slingerlands to Albany. Originally a Whig, and later a Republican, while serving in the Assembly in the 1840s Slingerland was active on the side of the tenants during the Anti-Rent War, when the renters of the Albany area's small farms rose up against the effort of the Patroons to collect long-overdue back rents. Their efforts led to the end of the manor system that had empowered and enriched a few large landowning families since the founding of New York in the early 1600s.

Slingerland was also an antislavery activist; his work to publicize the 1848 Pearl incident while serving in Congress generated national headlines that caused advocates of abolition to increase their efforts to end slave trading in Washington, DC. Slingerland became a Republican when the party was founded in 1855, and campaigned for John C. Frémont for president in 1856. He served in the Assembly again from 1860 to 1861 and continued to advocate for tenants who wanted to end the manor system.

Slingerland died at his home in Slingerands, which is within the Slingerlands Historic District, and was interred in the family vault on his property.

== Early life ==
Slingerland was born in Jerusalem (now Feura Bush), a hamlet of Bethlehem, New York, and was the son of John and Leah (Britt) Slingerland. He attended the local schools, operated a successful farm, and took part in several business ventures. Among the companies in which he was a participant was the Albany, Rensselaerville and Schoharie Plank Road Company; he was an original incorporator, and served on the board of directors. During its existence, the company built and maintained a toll road from Albany to Gallupville, which passed through New Scotland, New Salem, and Berne.

== New York State Assembly ==
A Whig, Slingerland was a member of the New York State Assembly in 1843 and 1844. During the Anti-Rent War, a revolt by tenants against New York's Patroon system, Slingerland sided with the tenants, a position he maintained during his service in the Assembly and his term in Congress.

== Congressman ==
He was elected as a Whig to the 30th Congress, holding office from March 4, 1847 to March 3, 1849. He was not a candidate for renomination in 1848 and resumed his business and agricultural pursuits. He was active in railroad development, and worked to bring the Albany and Susquehanna Railroad line to Bethlehem.

In 1848 Slingerland made national headlines when he alerted anti-slavery activists to the plight of more than 70 slaves who had attempted to escape Washington aboard a ship, The Pearl. Slave owners and slave traders recaptured the escapees and sold many of them to owners in the deep South, making it more difficult for them to escape again. The publicity Slingerland helped generate had the effect of causing abolitionists to increase their efforts to end the slave trade in Washington.

== Later life ==
He joined the Republican Party at its founding, and campaigned for John C. Frémont for President in 1856. He served again in the New York State Assembly from 1860 to 1861.

== Death and burial ==
Slingerland Family Vault in the Slingerlands (NY) Historic District

Slingerland died in Slingerlands, New York on October 26, 1861; interment was in the Slingerland family mausoleum.

== Family ==
In 1823, Slingerland married Elizabeth Van Derzee (1802-1835) in New Salem. Their children included Maria, John (d. 1882), and Harmon V. (1835-1917).

After the death of his first wife, Slingerland married Sally Hall (d. 1874). Their children included Elizabeth (b. 1838) and William (b. 1845).

Slingerland Family Memorial Marker at the Slingerland Family Vault

== Legacy ==
The hamlet of Slingerlands is named for his family, and some descendants continue to reside there. His home at 1575 New Scotland Road still stands and is part of the Slingerlands Historic District, which was added to the National Register of Historic Places in 2012. In 2018, an article in the Albany Times Union detailed ongoing efforts to preserve the Slingerland family vault.

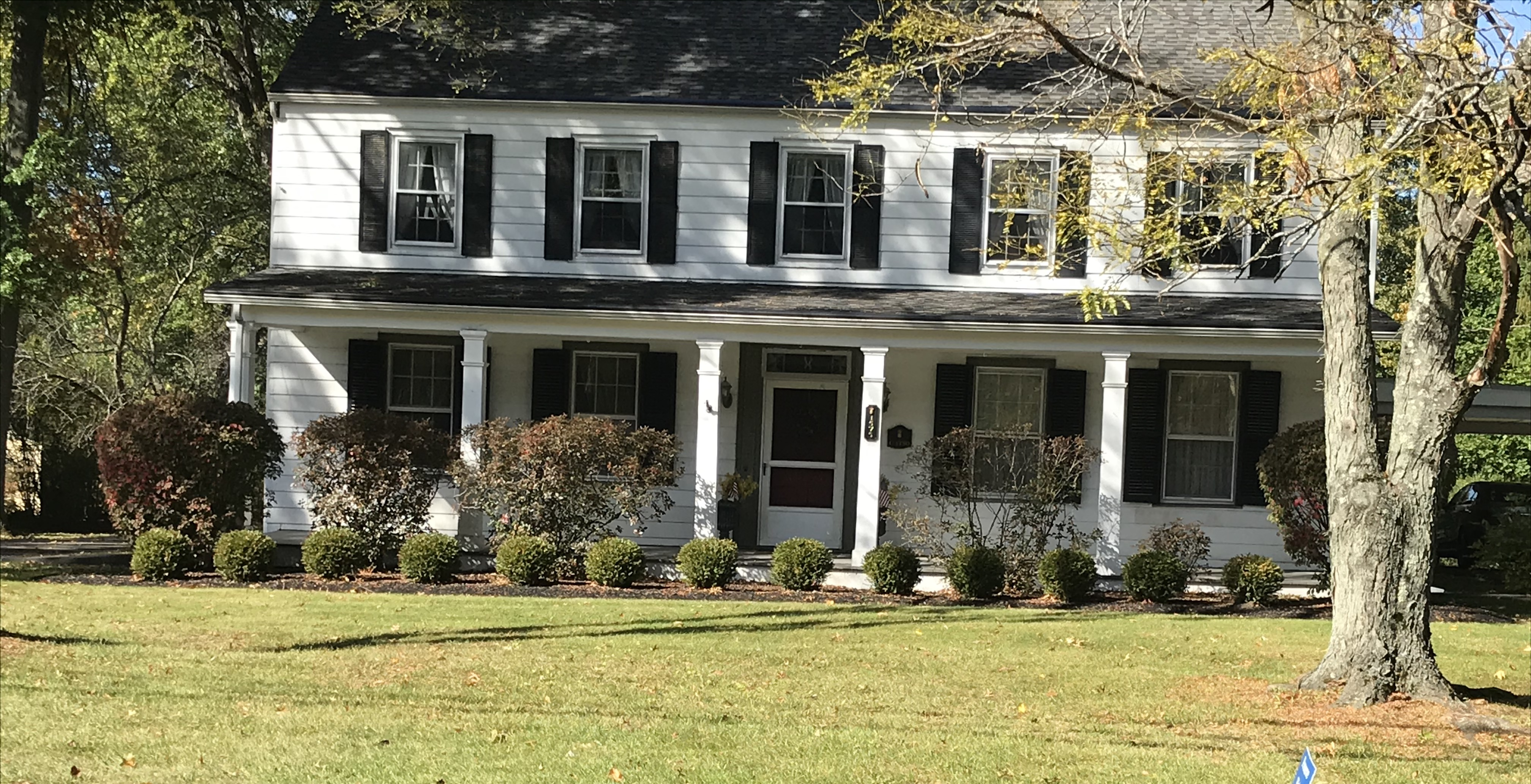
John I. Slingerland House, located in the Slingerlands Historic District

== Sources ==
=== Newspapers ===
- Slingerland, John I. (May 8, 1848). "Horrors of Slavery: Letter of John I. Slingerland to Thurlow Weed". Sandusky Clarion. Sandusky, OH – via Newspapers.com.
- Slingerland, John I. (August 18, 1856). "Letter from Hon. John I. Slingerland". Albany Evening Journal. Albany, NY – via GenealogyBank.com.
- "Death Notice, John I. Slingerland". Burlington Daily Times. Burlington, VT. October 28, 1961 – via Newspapers.com.
- Rulison, Larry (January 7, 2018). "Saving the Slingerland vault: DNA kit kick-starts direct decendant's mission to rescue an abandoned treasure". Times Union. Albany, NY.

=== Books ===
- Burhans, Samuel Jr. (1894). Burhans Genealogy. New York, NY: Samuel Burhans Jr. p. 234. (Note: The Burhans Genealogy names "John J. Slingerland". This individual's identity as John I. Slingerland is confirmed by comparing the names of his parents and his birth and death dates to other sources.)
- Howell, George Rogers; Tenney, Jonathan (1886). Bi-centennial History of Albany. Vol. 2. Albany, NY: W. W. Munsell & Co.
- Lanman, Charles (1868). Dictionary of the United States Congress and the General Government. Hartford, CT: T. Belknap & H. E. Goodwin. p. 349.
- Leath, Susan E. (2011). Images of America: Bethlehem, New York. Charleston, SC: Arcadia Publishing. ISBN 978-0-7385-7646-6.
- McCurdy, Charles W. (2001). The Anti-Rent Era in New York Law and Politics, 1839-1865. Chapel Hill, NC: University of North Carolina Press. ISBN 978-0-8078-2590-7.
- Sinha, Manisha (2016). The Slave's Cause: A History of Abolition. New Haven, CT: Yale University Press. ISBN 978-0-300-18137-1.

=== Internet ===
- Hannay, Col. William V. (April 25, 1935). "Slingerland Vault: Slingerlands, Albany County, New York". onentofl.com/. Irwin, IA: C. G. Brisee Genealogy Library.
- Leath, Susan E. (January 31, 2017). "Looking for John I. Slingerland". Bethlehem NY History. Bethlehem, NY: Susan Leath.
- "New York Death Index, 1880-1956, Entry for Harmon Slingerland". Ancestry.com. Provo, UT: Ancestry.com, LLC.

=== Magazines ===
- Tucker, Luther (October 1960). "Albany County Fair". The Cultivator. Albany, NY: Luther Tucker & Son.

== Notes ==
U.S. House of Representatives
Preceded by Bradford R. Wood	Member of the U.S. House of Representatives from New York's 13th congressional district March 4, 1847 – March 3, 1849	Succeeded by John L. Schoolcraft
New York State Assembly
Preceded by Henry Creble	New York State Assembly; Albany County, 1st District; 1860–1861	Succeeded by Jay Gibbons
Preceded by John Adams Dix, Cornelius G. Palmer, Jonas Shear	New York State Assembly; Albany County, 1st District; 1843–1844; With: Willis Hall, Aaron Van Schaack	Succeeded by Levi Shaw, Samuel Stevens, Simon Veeder
