= Peter G. Ten Eyck =

American politician

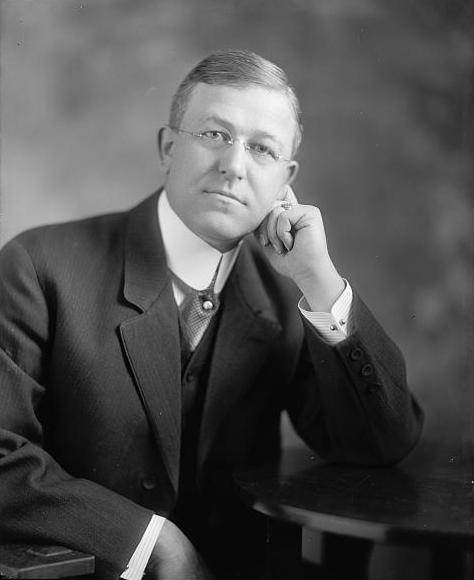
- Harris & Ewing photo, c. 1915

Member of the United States House of Representatives from New York's 28th district
- In office March 4, 1921 – March 3, 1923
- Preceded by: Rollin Sanford
- Succeeded by: Parker Corning
- In office March 4, 1913 – March 3, 1915
- Preceded by: Luther W. Mott
- Succeeded by: Rollin Sanford

New York State Commissioner of Agriculture
- In office February 13, 1935 – June 18, 1937
- Preceded by: Charles H. Baldwin
- Succeeded by: Holton V. Noyes

Chairman of the Port of Albany District Commission
- In office March 28, 1928 – April 30, 1935
- Preceded by: None (position created)
- Succeeded by: Dwight B. La Du

Member of the Port of Albany District Commission
- In office March 28, 1928 – April 30, 1935
- Preceded by: None (position created)
- Succeeded by: Leo W. O'Brien

Personal details
- Born: November 7, 1873 Bethlehem, New York, US
- Died: September 2, 1944 (aged 70) Altamont, New York, US
- Resting place: Albany Rural Cemetery, Menands, New York, US
- Party: Democratic
- Spouse: Bertha F. Dederick (m. 1903–1944)
- Relations: Leonard Gansevoort (great-great grandfather)
- Children: 1
- Education: Rensselaer Polytechnic Institute (attended)
- Profession: Civil engineer

Peter Gansevoort Ten Eyck (November 7, 1873 – September 2, 1944) was an American businessman and politician from Albany, New York. A Democrat, he served as a U.S. representative from 1913 to 1915 and again from 1921 to 1923.

A native of Bethlehem, New York, Ten Eyck was a descendant of several Dutch American families long prominent in New York, including the Ten Eycks and Gansevoorts. He attended the district school in the Normansville hamlet of Bethlehem and graduated from The Albany Academy. He then studied civil engineering at Rensselaer Polytechnic Institute, after which he embarked on a railroad career with the New York Central. He advanced from batteryman to signal engineer, and also served in the New York National Guard's 3rd Signal Corps, a unit of the 3rd Brigade. He remained with the New York Central until 1903, when he joined the Federal Railway Signal Company. He rose through Federal Railway's ranks to become the company's vice president and general manager.

Active in local politics and government as a Democrat, in 1912 Ten Eyck won election to the United States House of Representatives, and he served one term, 1913 to 1915. He was an unsuccessful candidate for reelection in 1914, but ran again in 1920 and won. He served one term, 1921 to 1923, and declined to run again in 1922. In 1928, Democratic Party leaders attempted to recruit Ten Eyck as a candidate for governor, but he declined to make the race. A longtime booster of the Hudson River-Erie Canal shipping route over the proposed St. Lawrence Seaway, Ten Eyck served on the Port of Albany District Commission. From 1935 to 1937, he was New York's Commissioner of Agriculture. He died in Altamont, New York and was buried at Albany Rural Cemetery.

== Early life ==
Peter G. Ten Eyck (Note: Pronounced "Ten Ike.") was born at Whitehall Place, the Ten Eyck family mansion in Bethlehem, New York, on November 8, 1873, a son of Abraham Cuyler Ten Eyck and Margaret Matilda (Haswell) Ten Eyck. He attended the district school in Normansville, a hamlet of Bethlehem, before becoming a student at The Albany Academy. Ten Eyck attended Rensselaer Polytechnic Institute (RPI), where he studied civil engineering as a member of the class of 1896. While at RPI, Ten Eyck became a member of the Delta Phi fraternity.

Ten Eyck worked as a surveyor, and assisted in laying out Albany, New York's Lincoln Park. He was then employed by the New York Central Railroad, where he worked up the ranks as a battery technician, electrician, mechanic, and foreman. He then became a signal inspector, followed by promotions to superintendent of signals, assistant signal engineer, and signal engineer. Ten Eyck served for seven years in the New York National Guard's 3rd Signal Corps, a unit of the 3rd Brigade.

=== Family ===
In 1903, Ten Eyck married Bertha Floretta Dederick, the daughter of inventor and manufacturer Peter Kells Dederick. They were the parents of a son, Peter Gansevoort Dederick Ten Eyck.

== Continued career ==
In 1903, Ten Eyck joined the Federal Railway Signal Company as chief engineer, and he was subsequently appointed vice president and general manager. He was a recognized subject matter expert on railroad signals, and was often employed as a consulting engineer. Ten Eyck was also an inventor, and among the devices for which he received a patent was an insulated railway joint that was intended to keep dirt, cinders, and other debris from interfering with the electrical circuits used in signaling systems.

Ten Eyck was a gentleman dairy and fruit farmer. In 1905, he founded an insurance and real estate company, and the legacy office, the Ten Eyck Group, is still in operation. He was also an officer or director of several other railroads and banks, including the Chicago, Rock Island and Pacific Railroad, National Commercial Bank & Trust of Albany, and the Albany City Savings Institution. In addition, he was prominent in the Albany Chamber of Commerce, Hudson Valley Federated Chamber of Commerce, New York State Real Estate Association, and New York State Insurance Federation. He was a member of the New York State Agricultural Experiment Station's board of control, vice president of the New York State Agricultural Society, vice president of the New York State Federation of Farm Bureaus, and an officer of the Albany County Agricultural Society and Albany County Farm Bureau.

A noted civic activist, Ten Eyck was a trustee, director or officer of numerous institutions, including the Albany Homeopathic Hospital and Albany Institute of History & Art. Among his fraternal memberships were the Freemasons, Elks, and Grange. As a proponent of greater commercial development of the Hudson River, he became active in the Atlantic Deeper Waterways Association and the National Rivers and Harbors Congress. He also belonged to several other clubs and associations, including the Fort Orange Club, Albany Country Club, Wolfert's Roost Country Club, Transportation Club of New York, National Democratic Club, Albany Automobile Club, and University Club of Albany. Ten Eyck was also a member of the Holland Society of New York, Sons of the American Revolution, Albany Academy Alumni Society, and Rensselaer Polytechnic Institute Alumni Society.

== Later career ==
Ten Eyck was a delegate to the 1912 Democratic National Convention and later that year was elected to the United States House of Representatives. He served one term, March 4, 1913 to March 3, 1915. During his term, Ten Eyck advocated for greater commercial shipping on the Hudson River-Erie Canal waterway, rather than creation of a proposed St. Lawrence Seaway. He was an unsuccessful candidate for reelection in 1914.

During World War I, Ten Eyck was secretary of his local draft board, chairman of several local American Red Cross membership drives, chairman of the New York and Connecticut transport committee for the Council of National Defense, and chairman of the council's New York organization. He was a delegate to the 1920 Democratic National Convention, and later that year was elected to a second term in the U.S. House. As with his first term, during his second Ten Eyck advocated for expansion and development of the Hudson River-Erie Canal shipping route. He did not run for reelection in 1922.

After leaving Congress, Ten Eyck returned to his business and farming interests, including development of Indian Ladder Farms, an Altamont, New York venture that continues to be operated by the Ten Eyck family. In 1926, New York Democratic Party leaders attempted to identify a candidate for governor in the 1928 election, assuming that incumbent Al Smith was reelected in 1926 and ran for president in 1928. Their first choice, Albany mayor William Stormont Hackett, died in 1926. Party leaders than considered several other potential candidates; Lieutenant Governor Edwin Corning declined because of ill health, after which several other candidates declined to be considered, including Robert F. Wagner, George R. Lunn, and Ten Eyck. They then turned to Franklin D. Roosevelt, who went on to win the 1928 election. In March 1928, the state authorized creation of the Port of Albany District Commission to promote development of the Hudson River commercial shipping route; Ten Eyck was appointed by Governor Smith and was selected as the commission's first chairman. He served as a commissioner until April 1935, and was succeeded by Dwight B. La Du as chairman and as commissioner by Leo W. O'Brien.

In February 1935, the state council of agriculture and markets was abolished and the governor was empowered to select a new commissioner of agriculture. Governor Herbert Lehman selected Ten Eyck, who succeeded Charles H. Baldwin. He served until June 1937, when he resigned partly because of declining health, and partly because of disagreement with Lehman over implementation of a Lehman-backed law that attempted to set prices paid to dairy farmers by protecting established milk dealers from competition. He was succeeded by Holton V. Noyes. After resigning, Ten Eyck continued to improve Indian Ladder Farms. He died in Altamont on September 2, 1944. Ten Eyck was buried at Albany Rural Cemetery in Menands, New York.

== Notes ==
U.S. House of Representatives
| Preceded by Luther W. Mott | Member of the U.S. House of Representatives from New York's 28th congressional district 1913–1915 | Succeeded by Rollin Sanford |
| Preceded by Rollin Sanford | Member of the U.S. House of Representatives from New York's 28th congressional district 1921–1923 | Succeeded by Parker Corning |
