= Savin Rock =

Neighborhood in West Haven, Connecticut, United States

Coordinates: 41°15′35″N 72°56′43″W

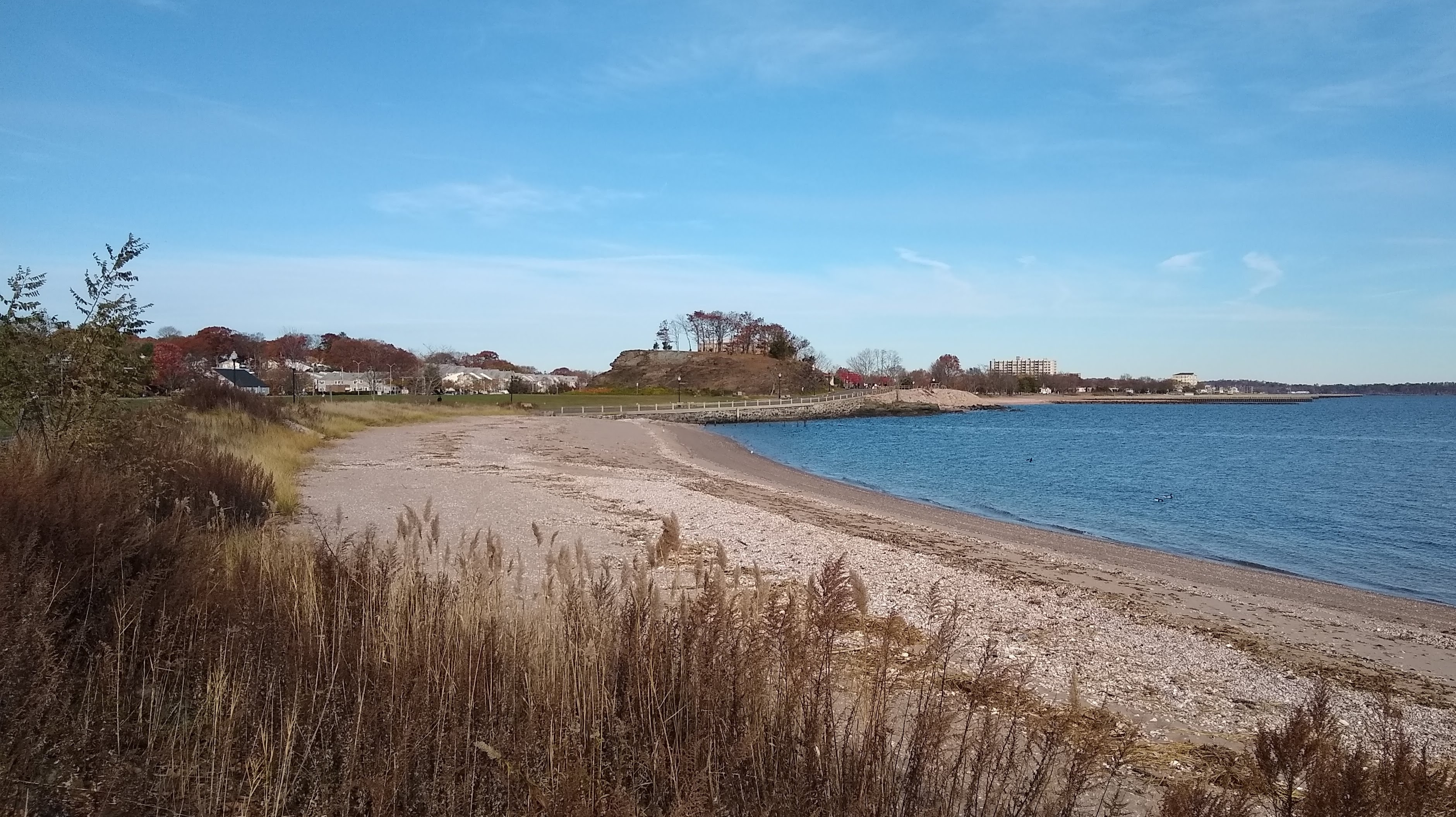
Savin Rock, West Haven, CT, USA

Savin Rock is a section of West Haven, Connecticut, named after the rocky outcropping at the shorefront in Bradley Point Park.

It was the site of the Savin Rock Amusement Park, which began in the late 19th century as a regionally renowned seaside resort. It evolved into a general amusement park in the 20th century and eventually closed in 1966.

The park ran along the west side of New Haven Harbor beachfront and is today a walk and bike path. The path is part of the East Coast Greenway.

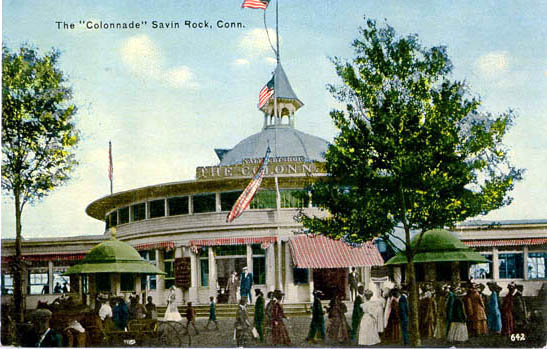
Postcard picture of The Colonnade, Savin Rock
