= Banking Act of 1935 =

US banking legislation

- Long title: An Act To provide for the sound, effective, and uninterrupted operation of the banking system, and for other purposes.
- Enacted by: the 74th United States Congress
- Effective: August 23, 1935

Citations
- Public law: Public Law 74-305
- Statutes at Large: 49 Stat. 684

Codification
- Acts amended: Federal Reserve Act, Banking Act of 1933 (Glass–Steagall)

Legislative history
- Introduced in the House of Representatives as H.R. 7617 by Henry B. Steagall (D–AL) on February 5, 1935; Committee consideration by House Committee on Banking and Currency, Senate Committee on Banking and Currency; Passed the House on May 9, 1935 (271–110); Passed the Senate as the with amendment on July 26, 1935 (Voice vote); Reported by the joint conference committee on August 17, 1935; agreed to by the House on August 19, 1935 (Voice vote) and by the Senate on August 19, 1935 (Voice vote); Signed into law by President Franklin D. Roosevelt on August 23, 1935

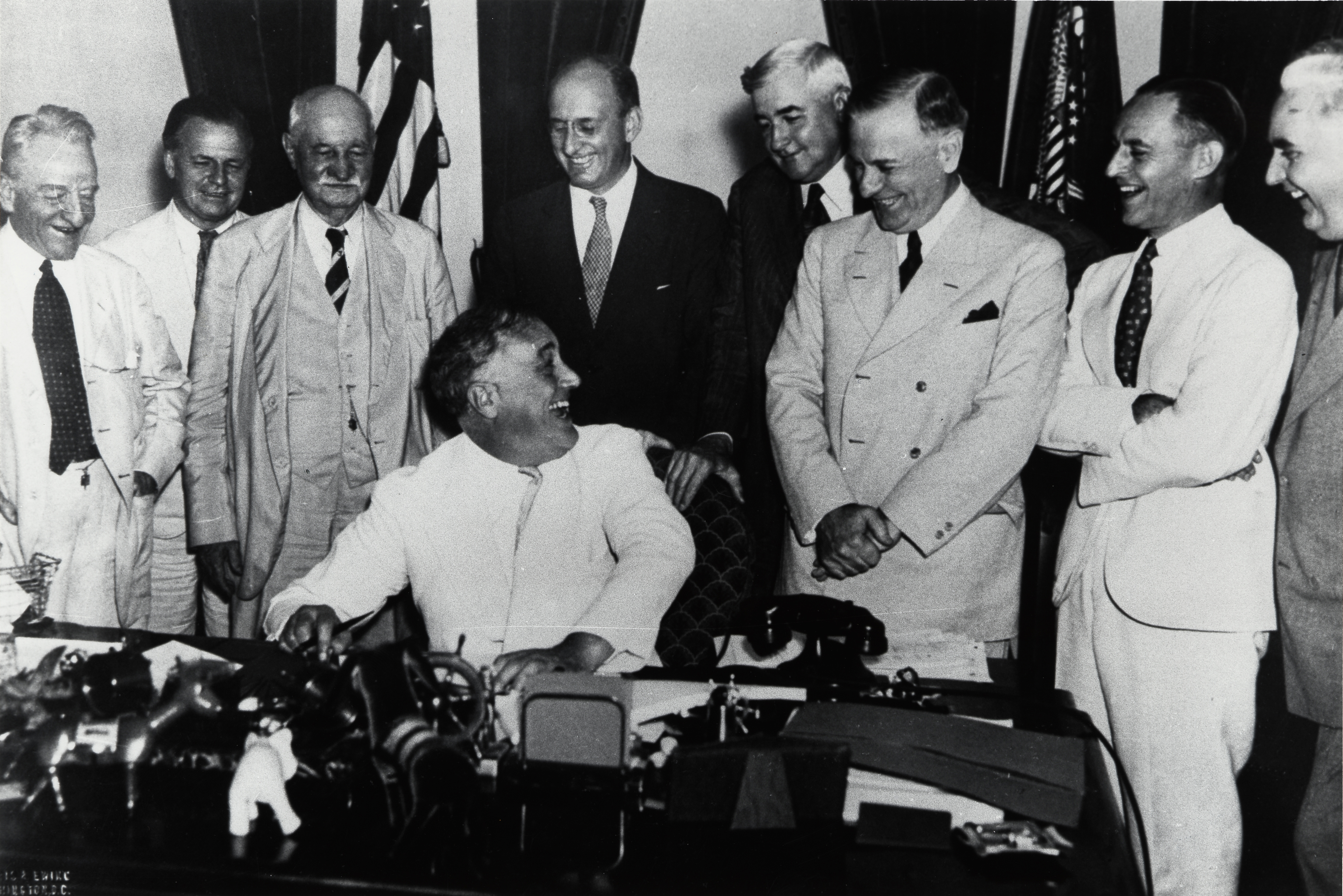
Roosevelt signs the Banking Act of 1935

The Banking Act of 1935, passed by the United States Congress on August 19, 1935, and signed into law by President Franklin D. Roosevelt on August 23, is a U.S. federal law that changed the structure and power distribution in the Federal Reserve System that began with the Banking Act of 1933. The Act contained three titles.

The law created the modern structure of the Federal Reserve and placed monetary-policy decisions beyond presidential control.

== Title I ==
Title I amended section 12B of the 1933 Act with regards to the creation of the Federal Deposit Insurance Corporation (FDIC) and its duties. The board of directors of the FDIC would include the comptroller of the currency and two members selected by the president and confirmed by the Senate. They shall hold a term of 6 years and receive an annual salary of $10,000. Title I also established the maximum insured deposit to be $5,000.

=== FDIC ===
The Act of 1935 made the FDIC permanent, and included the following provisions:

- All accounts would be insured up to $5,000. At this time 98.5% of all deposits were under the $5,000 limit. This was a dramatic change from the initial guidelines under the 1933 act.
- All banks who were insured under the initial creation of the FDIC are still insured under the new permanent program. All Federal Reserve member banks are required to participate in the FDIC. Smaller state banks, national banks who were not members of the Federal Reserve System, savings and loan institutions and other similar organizations had differing requirements for participation.
- All banks who participated in the FDIC were able to advertise and place signage in their business stating that the deposits (up to $5,000) were insured by the FDIC. These signs are still displayed at local banks.

== Title II ==
=== Board of Governors ===
Title II (in section 203 of the Act) changed the name of the "Federal Reserve Board" to the "Board of Governors of the Federal Reserve System." The board consists of seven members selected by the president with advice and consent of the Senate. Each member would serve a fourteen-year term on the Board. Of those selected one member would be selected as chairman and one as vice-chairman each serving four years in that capacity.

=== Federal Open Market Committee ===
Title II also creates a Federal Open Market Committee (FOMC) The membership of this committee will include the governors of the Federal Reserve System and five representatives of the Federal Reserve banks. The Committee meets quarterly in Washington DC. The FOMC controls how and when Reserve Banks participate in open market operations. All such decisions go through the FOMC.

=== Loans to member banks ===
The Act renewed the ability of each Federal Reserve bank to make loans to its member banks. The rates for these loans must be 0.5% above the current discount rate at the Federal Reserve.

== Title III ==
Title III included 46 sections of technical amendments that clarified banking legislation. These included but were not limited to the rules of stock ownership, elimination of double liability, surplus requirements, rules for loans to executives, rules of branch banking, rules of securities transactions and the rights of shareholders.

== Origin ==
For a few years, there had been growing desire for changes to be made to the Federal Reserve Act. In 1934 Jacob Viner, was an assistant to the Treasury Secretary Henry Morgenthau Jr. Viner chaired a committee tasked with determining what changes were needed to update the Federal Reserve Act. Marriner Stoddard Eccles became the governor of the Federal Reserve Board on November 15, 1934. He immediately dismissed the token reforms put forth by Viner and the committee. Eccles insisted that the two main goals of the new legislation were to "control speculation" and to "promote the stability of employment and business". To make this happen, Eccles also wanted the Federal Reserve to become the Central Bank with concentrated power.

Eccles proposed four key points to be included in the new legislation:

1. Change the title and approval process for the bank's heads;
2. Create a central committee of board members and bank governors to control open market operations;
3. Place the board in control of paper specification; and
4. Ease controls on real estate lending.

=== Legislation ===
On February 5, 1935, the "Administration banking bill", as it was initially titled, was given to the House Committee on Banking and Currency. There was strong public demand for reform, including multiple plans for a federally owned and operated central bank. The bill passed the House (271-110) very quickly and with all main points intact.

In the Senate, the bill faced stiffer criticism, specifically from Carter Glass. The main sticking point was who was to have the most control, the bankers or the politicians. The bill that eventually passed the Senate was a compromise. The Act was signed into law by Franklin D. Roosevelt on August 23, 1935.

== See also ==
- Causes of the Great Depression
- Chicago plan
- Shiftability theory
