= Edward B. Vreeland =

American politician

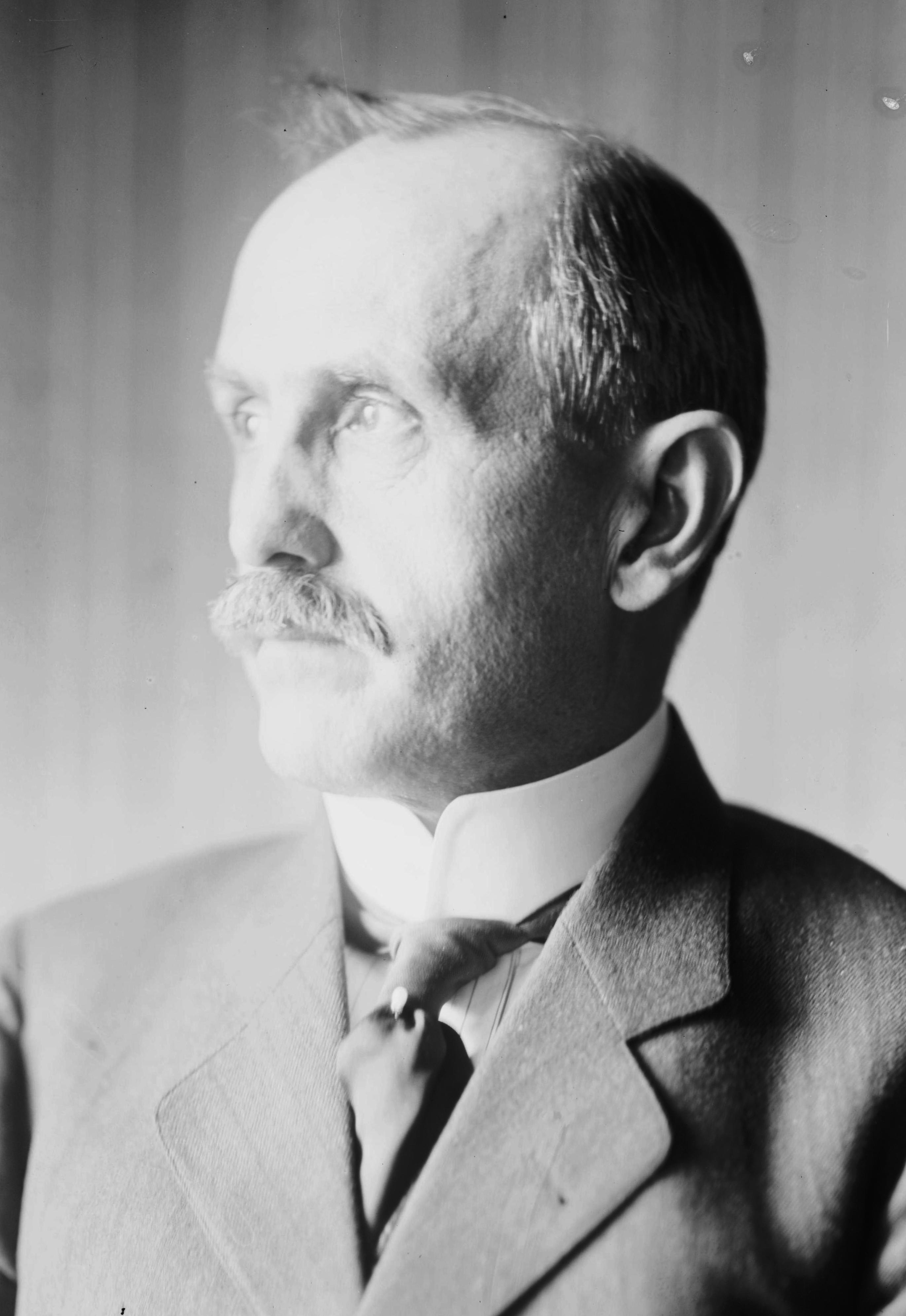
- Vreeland in 1908

Member of the U.S. House of Representatives from New York
- In office November 7, 1899 – March 3, 1913
- Preceded by: Warren B. Hooker
- Succeeded by: Edwin S. Underhill
- Constituency: 34th district (1899–1903); 37th district (1903–1913)

Personal details
- Born: December 7, 1856 Cuba, New York, US
- Died: May 8, 1936 (aged 79) Salamanca, New York, US
- Party: Republican
- Spouse: Myra S. Price (m. 1881)

Edward Butterfield Vreeland (December 7, 1856 – May 8, 1936) was an American banker, businessman, and Republican politician who represented southern Western New York (Allegheny, Chautauqua, and Cattaraugus counties) in the United States House of Representatives from 1899 to 1913. He is best remembered today as an author and namesake of the Aldrich-Vreeland Act, which established the National Monetary Commission in response to the Panic of 1907. Vreeland served as its vice chair.

== Early life ==
Edward Butterfield Vreeland was born in Cuba, Allegany County, New York.

In 1869, he moved to Salamanca, New York. He graduated from Friendship Academy in 1877.

He married Myra S. Price on February 27, 1881, and they had three children.

== Business and local politics ==
After his graduation, Vreeland served as superintendent of the Salamanca public schools from 1877 to 1882. He studied law, was admitted to the bar in 1881, but did not engage in active practice. He engaged in banking and in the oil and insurance business and became president of the Salamanca Trust Co. in 1891

From 1889 to 1893, Vreeland served as postmaster of Salamanca.

== United States House of Representatives ==
Vreeland was elected as a Republican to the Fifty-sixth Congress to fill the vacancy caused by the resignation of Warren B. Hooker. He was reelected to the Fifty-seventh and to the five succeeding Congresses and held office from November 7, 1899 to March 3, 1913. While in the House, he was chairman of the Committee on Banking and Currency (Sixty-first Congress).

He declined to be a candidate for renomination in 1912, and was appointed a member of the National Monetary Commission, serving as vice chairman from 1909 to 1912.

== Retirement and death ==
He resumed former business pursuits in Salamanca until January 1, 1936, when he retired from active business. He died at his home in Salamanca on May 8; interment was in Wildwood Cemetery.

U.S. House of Representatives
Preceded by Warren B. Hooker	Member of the U.S. House of Representatives from New York's 34th congressional district 1899–1903	Succeeded by James Wolcott Wadsworth
New district	Member of the U.S. House of Representatives from New York's 37th congressional district 1903–1913	Succeeded by Edwin S. Underhill
