= Bert Lord =

American politician (1869–1939)

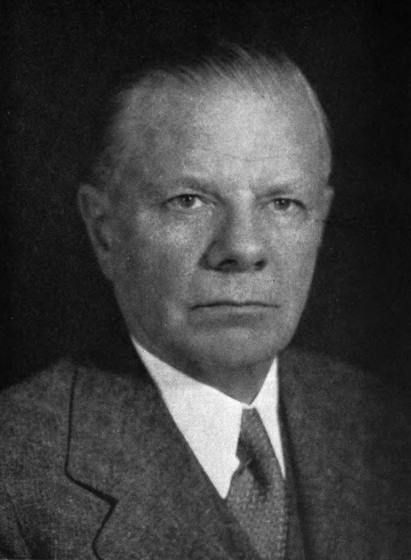

Member of the U.S. House of Representatives from New York's 34th district
- In office January 3, 1935 – May 24, 1939
- Preceded by: Marian W. Clarke
- Succeeded by: Edwin Arthur Hall

Member of the New York Senate from the 40th district
- In office February 18, 1930 – November 6, 1934
- Preceded by: B. Roger Wales
- Succeeded by: Martin W. Deyo

Member of the New York State Assembly from the Chenango County district
- In office January 1, 1915 – December 31, 1921
- Preceded by: Samuel A. Jones
- Succeeded by: Charles L. Banks
- In office January 1, 1924 – January 3, 1930
- Preceded by: Charles L. Banks
- Succeeded by: Irving Ives

Personal details
- Born: December 4, 1869 Sanford, New York
- Died: May 24, 1939 (aged 69) Washington, D.C.
- Party: Republican

Bert Lord (December 4, 1869 – May 24, 1939) was an American politician from New York. A Republican, he served several terms in the New York State Assembly and New York State Senate, and was a member of the United States House of Representatives from 1935 until his death.

== Early life ==
Born in the town of Sanford, Broome County, he attended the public schools and the Afton Union School and Academy.

== Career ==
Lord engaged in the mercantile business at Afton from 1893 to 1918, when he entered the lumber business and operated sawmills. He was Afton's town supervisor from 1905 to 1915; and a member of the New York State Assembly (Chenango Co.) in 1915, 1916, 1917, 1918, 1919, 1920 and 1921.

He was New York State Commissioner of Motor Vehicles from 1921 to 1923. He was again a member of the State Assembly in 1924, 1925, 1926, 1927, 1928 and 1929. On November 5, 1929, he was re-elected to the Assembly; on November 25 State Senator B. Roger Wales died, and Lord ran to succeed him.

On January 3, 1930, Lord was elected to the New York State Senate (40th D.). He served in the Senate until 1934, sitting in the 153rd, 154th, 155th, 156th and 157th New York State Legislatures.

Lord was elected as a Republican to the 74th, 75th and 76th United States Congresses; he served from January 3, 1935 until his death.

== Personal life ==
Lord was married twice; his first wife was Lillian (Kniskern) Lord (1872-1937), and in December 1938 he married Margaret T. Gregg, who survived him. Lord had no children.

=== Death ===
Lord suffered two heart attacks in May 1939. The second one proved fatal, and he died in Washington, D.C., on May 24, 1939. He was buried at Glenwood Cemetery in Afton.

== See also ==
- List of members of the United States Congress who died in office (1900–1949)

== Sources ==
=== Newspapers ===
- "Lord Resigns to Head New Automobile Bureau". Binghamton Press. Binghamton, NY. June 29, 1921.
- "Kingston Man named to Succeed Bert Lord". Binghamton Press. Binghamton, NY. United Press. July 23, 1923.
- "Lord Elected to Senate; Chenango County Republican Succeeds the Late R.R. Wales". New York Times. New York, NY. January 4, 1930.
- "Moses' Margin Slender; Lord Is Easy Victor". Binghamton Press. Binghamton, NY. November 7, 1934.
- "Mrs. Bert Lord is Dead at her Home in Afton". Binghamton Press. Binghamton, NY. May 25, 1937.
- "Married (Orange, Va.): Representative Bert Lord of Afton, N.Y. was married here to Mrs. George Gregg, also of Afton". Binghamton Press. Binghamton, NY. December 12, 1938.
- "Bert Lord Dies at 69; Funeral on Saturday". Binghamton Press. Binghamton, NY. May 24, 1939.

=== Books ===
United States House of Representatives (1941). Bert Lord, Late a Representative from New York. Washington, DC: US Government Printing Office.

== External sources ==
- United States Congress. "Bert Lord (id: L000439)". Biographical Directory of the United States Congress.
- Bert Lord at Find a Grave

New York State Assembly
Preceded by Samuel A. Jones	New York State Assembly; Chenango County; 1915–1921	Succeeded by Charles L. Banks
Preceded by Charles L. Banks	New York State Assembly; Chenango County; 1924–1930	Succeeded by Irving Ives
New York State Senate
Preceded by B. Roger Wales	New York State Senate; 40th District; 1930–1934	Succeeded by Martin W. Deyo
U.S. House of Representatives
Preceded by Marian W. Clarke	Member of the U.S. House of Representatives from New York's 34th congressional district 1935–1939	Succeeded by Edwin Arthur Hall
