= Warren B. Hooker =

American politician (1856–1920)

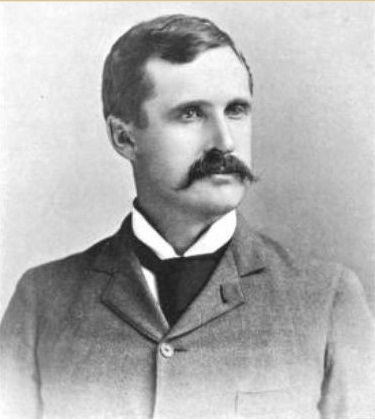

Member of the U.S. House of Representatives from New York's 34th district
- In office March 4, 1891 – November 10, 1898
- Preceded by: William G. Laidlaw
- Succeeded by: Edward B. Vreeland

Personal details
- Born: Warren Brewster Hooker; November 24, 1856 Perrysburg, New York, U.S.
- Died: March 5, 1920 (aged 63) Fredonia, New York, U.S.
- Resting place: Forest Hill Cemetery
- Party: Republican
- Profession: Politician, lawyer, judge

Warren Brewster Hooker (November 24, 1856 – March 5, 1920) was a U.S. representative from New York.

Born in Perrysburg, New York, Hooker attended the public schools and Forestville Free Academy, Forestville, New York. He studied law and was admitted to the bar in 1879 and commenced practice in Forestville. He served as Special Surrogate of Chautauqua County from 1878 to 1881.

He moved to Tacoma, Washington, and practiced there from 1882 to 1884. He returned to Fredonia, Pomfret Township, New York, and resumed his profession from 1884 to 1898. He was the Supervisor of the town of Pomfret in 1889 and 1890.

Hooker was elected as a Republican to the Fifty-second and to the four succeeding Congresses and served from March 4, 1891, until his resignation on November 10, 1898, before the close of the Fifty-fifth Congress. He served as chairman of the Committee on Rivers and Harbors (Fifty-fourth and Fifty-fifth Congresses)

On November 10, 1898, he was appointed a Justice of the Supreme Court of New York, 8th District, and resigned from Congress. He was elected to a 14-year term in 1899 and stayed until 1913.

He served as member of the Appellate Division from 1902 to 1909. In 1905, Hooker was the subject of an "impeachment trial" by the 128th New York State Legislature but was acquitted. He resumed the practice of law in Fredonia, New York, in 1914.

He was appointed official Referee of the State Supreme Court in 1919 but died in Fredonia, New York, March 5, 1920.

He was interred in Forest Hill Cemetery.

== Sources ==
- United States Congress. "Warren B. Hooker (id: H000760)". Biographical Directory of the United States Congress.
- Journal of the Senate (128th Session) (special session; 1905; with the complete proceedings against Hooker)

U.S. House of Representatives
Preceded by William G. Laidlaw	Member of the U.S. House of Representatives from New York's 34th congressional district 1891 – 1898-11-10	Succeeded by Edward B. Vreeland
