= John D. Clarke =

American politician (1873–1933)

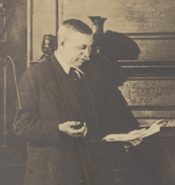

Member of the U.S. House of Representatives from New York's 34th district
- In office March 4, 1927 – November 5, 1933
- Preceded by: Harold S. Tolley
- Succeeded by: Marian W. Clarke
- In office March 4, 1921 – March 3, 1925
- Preceded by: William Henry Hill
- Succeeded by: Harold S. Tolley

Personal details
- Born: January 15, 1873 Hobart, New York, U.S.
- Died: November 5, 1933 (aged 60) Delhi, New York, U.S.
- Party: Republican
- Spouse: Marian W. Clarke
- Education: Lafayette College; Brooklyn Law School

John Davenport Clarke (January 15, 1873 – November 5, 1933) was a Republican member of the United States House of Representatives from New York.

== Biography ==
Clarke was born in Hobart, New York. He graduated from Lafayette College in 1898 and Brooklyn Law School in 1911. He was assistant to the secretary of mines of the United States Steel Corporation from 1901 until 1907. He was elected to Congress in 1920 and served from March 4, 1921, until March 3, 1925. He was again elected to Congress in 1926 and served from March 4, 1927, until his death in a car crash near Delhi, New York.

== See also ==
- List of members of the United States Congress who died in office (1900–1949)

== Sources ==
- United States Congress. "John D. Clarke (id: C000465)". Biographical Directory of the United States Congress.

U.S. House of Representatives
Preceded by William H. Hill	Member of the U.S. House of Representatives from New York's 34th congressional district 1921–1925	Succeeded by Harold S. Tolley
Preceded by Harold S. Tolley	Member of the U.S. House of Representatives from New York's 34th congressional district 1927–1933	Succeeded by Marian W. Clarke
