= Nelson W. Aldrich =

American politician (1841–1915)

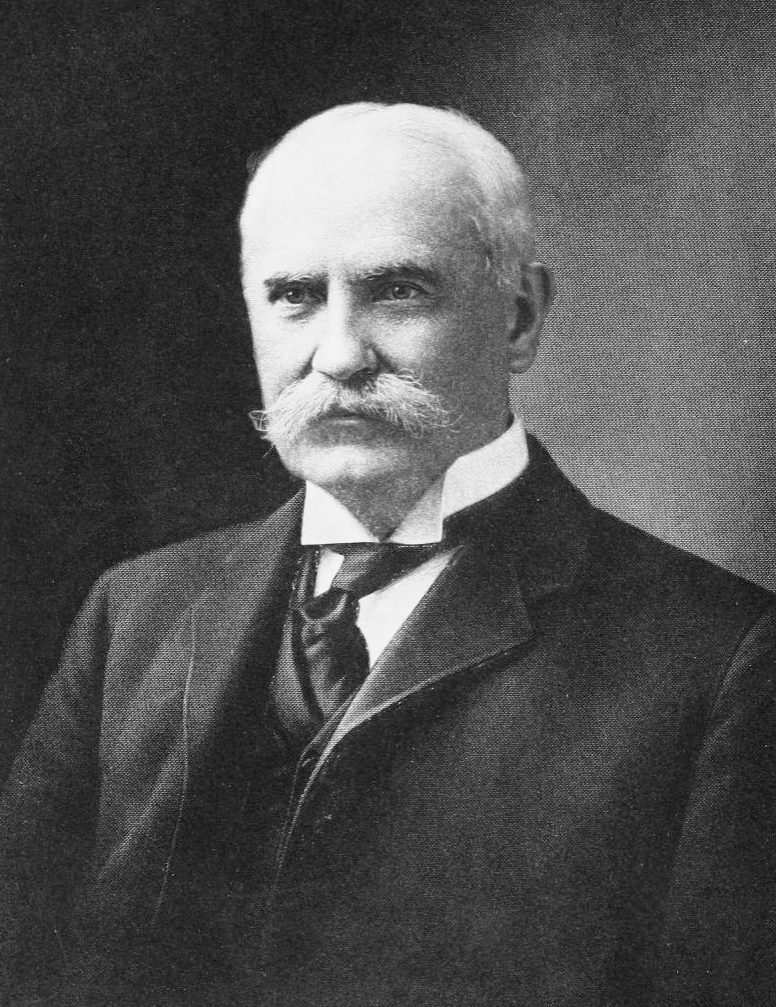

United States Senator from Rhode Island
- In office October 5, 1881 – March 3, 1911
- Preceded by: Ambrose Burnside
- Succeeded by: Henry F. Lippitt
Committee chairmanships
Chair of the Senate Finance Committee
In office December 29, 1898 – March 3, 1911
Preceded by	Justin Morrill
Succeeded by	Boies Penrose
Chair of the Senate Rules Committee
In office March 4, 1895 – March 4, 1899
Preceded by	Joseph Blackburn
Succeeded by	John Spooner
In office March 4, 1887 – March 4, 1893
Preceded by	William P. Frye
Succeeded by	Joseph Blackburn

Member of the U.S. House of Representatives from Rhode Island's 1st district
- In office March 4, 1879 – October 4, 1881
- Preceded by: Benjamin T. Eames
- Succeeded by: Henry J. Spooner

Member of the Rhode Island House of Representatives
- In office 1875–1876

Personal details
- Born: Nelson Wilmarth Aldrich; November 6, 1841 Foster, Rhode Island, U.S.
- Died: April 16, 1915 (aged 73) New York City, U.S.
- Resting place: Swan Point Cemetery
- Party: Republican
- Spouse: Abigail Pearce Truman Chapman
- Relations: John D. Rockefeller III (grandson); Nelson Rockefeller (grandson); Laurance Rockefeller (grandson); Winthrop Rockefeller (grandson); Jay Rockefeller (great-grandson); Win Rockefeller (great-grandson); Laura Rockefeller Chasin (great-great-granddaughter); Justin Rockefeller (great-great-grandson)
- Children: 11, including Lucy, Abby, Richard, and Winthrop
- Education: East Greenwich Academy
- Profession: Businessman

Military service
- Allegiance: United States; Union
- Branch/service: United States Army; Union Army
- Years of service: 1862
- Rank: Private
- Unit: 10th Rhode Island Infantry
- Battles/wars: American Civil War

Nelson Wilmarth Aldrich (/ˈɔːldrɪtʃ/; November 6, 1841 – April 16, 1915) was a prominent American politician and a leader of the Republican Party in the United States Senate, where he represented Rhode Island from 1881 to 1911. By the 1890s, he was one of the "Big Four" key Republicans who largely controlled the major decisions of the Senate, along with Orville H. Platt, William B. Allison, and John Coit Spooner. Because of his impact on national politics and central position on the pivotal Senate Finance Committee, he was referred to by the press and public alike as the "general manager of the Nation", dominating tariff and monetary policy in the first decade of the 20th century.

Born at Burgess Farm in Foster, Rhode Island, Aldrich served in the Union Army during the American Civil War. After the war, he worked his way up to become a partner in a large wholesale grocery firm and won election to the Rhode Island House of Representatives. He then served a single term in the United States House of Representatives before winning election to the Senate. In the Senate, he helped to create an extensive system of tariffs that protected American factories and farms from foreign competition, and he was a cosponsor of the Payne–Aldrich Tariff Act. He also helped win Senate approval of the 1898 Treaty of Paris, which ended the Spanish–American War.

Aldrich led the passage of the Aldrich–Vreeland Act, which established the National Monetary Commission to study the causes of the Panic of 1907. He served as chair of that commission, which drew up the Aldrich Plan as a basis for a reform of the financial regulatory system. The Aldrich Plan strongly influenced the Federal Reserve Act of 1913, which established the Federal Reserve System. In 1910, Aldrich organized a secret meeting on Jekyll Island with leading members of the financial sector such as members of J.P. Morgan and Paul Warburg to plan the Federal Reserve. He also sponsored the Sixteenth Amendment, which allowed for a direct federal income tax.

Deeply committed to the efficiency model of the Progressive Era, he believed that his financial and trade policies would lead to greater efficiency. Reformers, however, denounced him as representative of the evils of big business. His daughter Abigail married American financer John D. Rockefeller Jr. who was the son of Standard Oil co-founder John D. Rockefeller. His descendants, including namesake Nelson A. Rockefeller, became powerful figures in American politics and banking.

== Early life ==
Aldrich was born at Burgess Farm in Foster, Rhode Island, into a middle-class family purportedly descended from noted English immigrants John Winthrop, William Wickenden, and Roger Williams. His branch passed through generations of declining circumstances. His father was Anan E. Aldrich, a mill hand, and mother Abby Burgess. He attended public schools in East Killingly, Connecticut and the East Greenwich Academy, a boarding school in Rhode Island.

== Early career ==
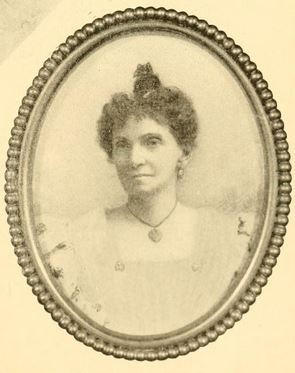
Abigail Pearce Truman Chapman

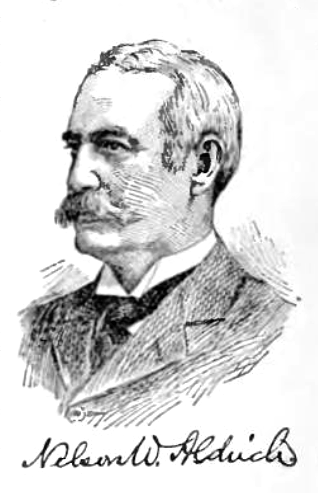
The signature of Nelson W. Aldrich

Aldrich's first job was clerking for the largest wholesale grocer in the state, where he worked his way up to become a partner in the firm.

He served briefly in the Union Army during the American Civil War when he enlisted as a private in Company D of the 10th Rhode Island Infantry on May 26, 1862. Aldrich's company served for three months at Fort DeRussy, which was part of the defenses of Washington, D.C. Aldrich was mustered out of service with the regiment on September 1, 1862.

On October 9, 1866, he married Abigail Pearce Truman "Abby" Chapman, a wealthy woman with impressive ancestry. They had a total of eleven children.

Aldrich began to debate at the local public lecture hall on various political issues of the era. In 1872, after the loss of a child and in the midst of health issues, Aldrich took a five-month tour of Europe and renewed his life's ambition. Aldrich became involved with politics and with the help of local business people in Providence, Aldrich also became a director of a small bank.

== Early political career ==
By 1877, Nelson had a major effect on state politics, even before his election to the United States Congress. He served as a member of the Providence City Council from 1869 to 1875 and as its president in 1872 and 1873, he then was elected as a Republican to the Rhode Island House of Representatives, from 1875 to 1876, and served as Speaker of the House in 1876.

== U.S. Senate ==
In 1878 the Republican bosses of Rhode Island endorsed him for the U.S. House of Representatives; he won and served one term, 1879 to 1881. In 1881 he was elected to the U.S. Senate by the Rhode Island legislature. He served in the Senate for 30 years from 1881 to 1911. He was the longest-serving United States Senator from Rhode Island before the 36-year tenure of Claiborne Pell in the late 20th century.

His long tenure in the Senate was assisted by Rhode Island's restriction of the office to property owners and native-born citizens willing to pay a poll tax, and later, by a legislature that gerrymandered in favor of small Republican towns. Aldrich occupied himself with national tariff issues when arriving in the Senate, and supported the tariff as vital to business owners and ordinary citizens alike. Alrich actively sought out the opinion of business leaders and became friendly with the Sugar Trust. Aldrich sometimes even secured the tariff rate to the amount that Theodore Havemeyer, a Sugar Trust member, requested.

By the 1890s, he was one of the "Big Four" key Republicans who largely controlled the major decisions of the Senate, along with Orville H. Platt of Connecticut, William B. Allison of Iowa and John Coit Spooner of Wisconsin. Aldrich's main power base was his chairmanship of the Senate Finance Committee which oversaw bank regulation and monetary policy. In the early 1890s, Aldrich was considering leaving the Senate, however, a businessman from Rhode Island, Marsden J. Perry, convinced him to stay by making Aldrich a partner in a plan to consolidate and electrify the state's trolley systems. Aldrich soon became a millionaire. Aldrich was opposed to backing currency with silver and was involved with convincing McKinley to run on a gold platform in 1896.

In 1906 Aldrich sold his interest in the Rhode Island street railway system to the New York, New Haven and Hartford Railroad, whose president, Charles Sanger Mellen, was Wall Street banker J. P. Morgan's loyal ally.

=== National finance ===
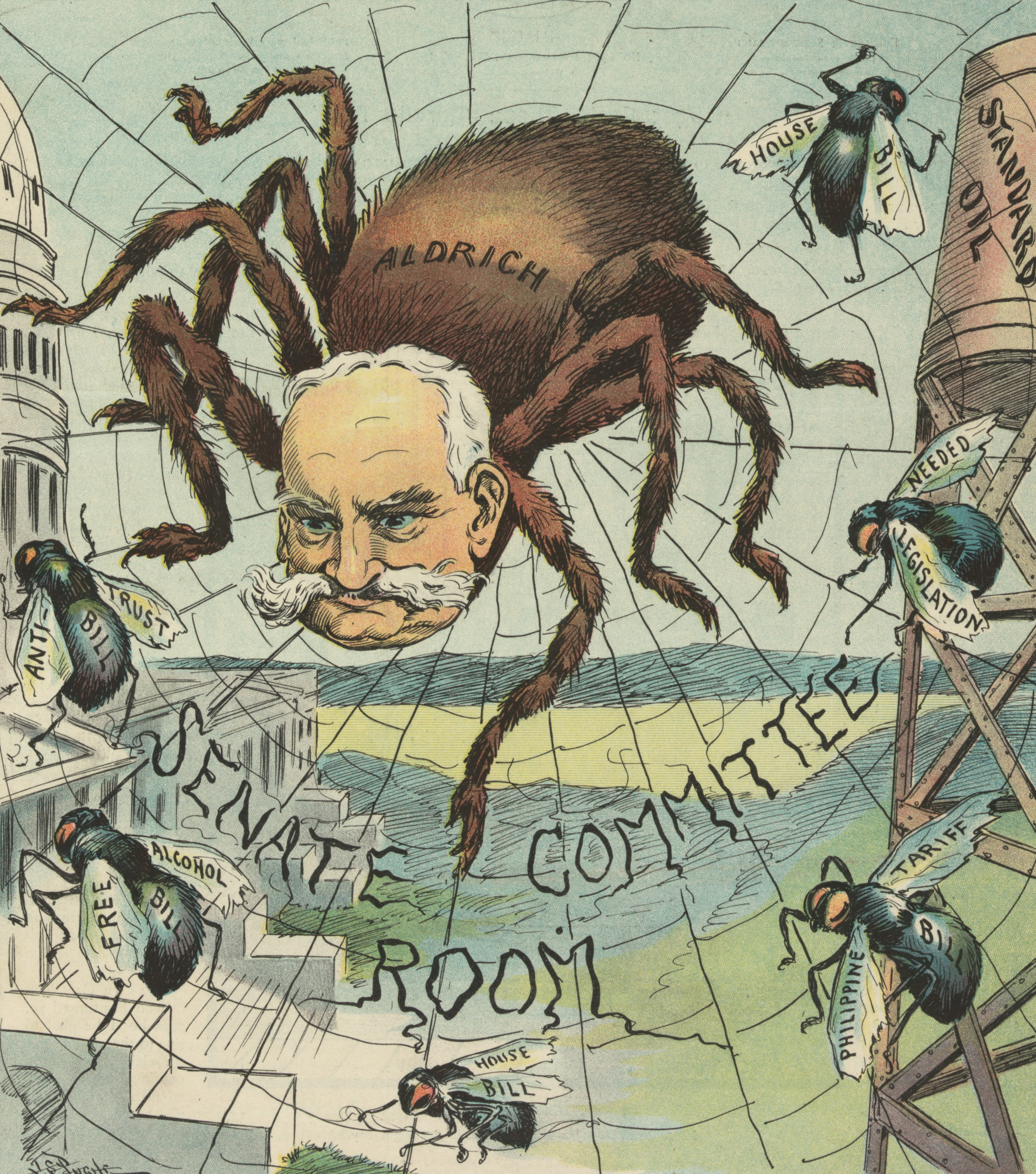
Reformers hated and feared Senator Aldrich for killing reforms disliked by big business. 1906 Puck cartoon.

In his subsequent career in the senate he was prominent in the discussion of the great financial questions that arose in Congress.

The panic of 1907 led to the passage of the Aldrich–Vreeland Act in 1908, which established the National Monetary Commission, sponsored and headed by Aldrich. After issuing a series of 30 reports, this commission drew up the Aldrich Plan, forming the basis for the Federal Reserve system.

As co-author of the Payne–Aldrich Tariff Act of 1909, Aldrich removed restrictive import duties on fine art, which enabled Americans to bring in very expensive European artworks that became the foundation of many leading museums.

In 1909, Aldrich introduced a constitutional amendment to establish an income tax, although he had declared a similar measure "communistic" a decade earlier. Aldrich was quite candid about his scheme to block the House bill that had been passed, declaring to the Senate: "I shall vote for the corporation tax as a means to defeat the income tax."

The compromise passed unanimously in the Senate and by a vote of 318 to 14 in the House. The corporate excise tax would be levied, and the income-tax constitutional amendment would be sent out to the states for ratification—which Taft and Aldrich thought was impossible.

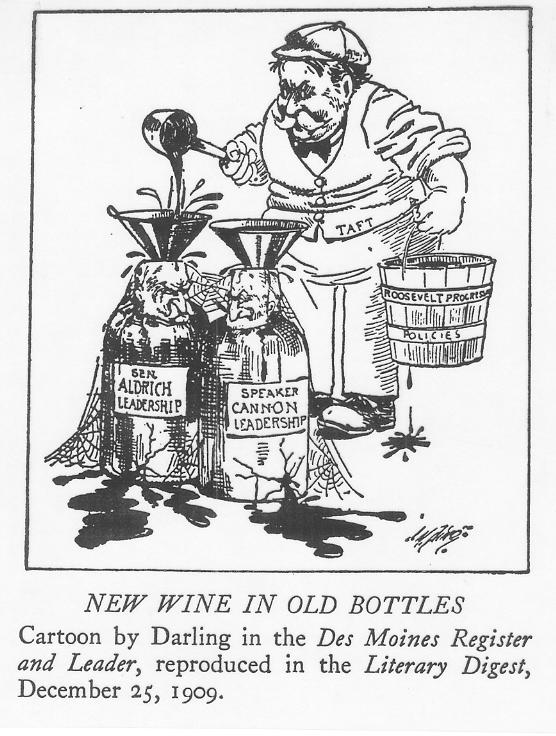
Taft tries to get progressive ideas into Aldrich

Aldrich also served as chairman of the Senate Republican Conference. During his Senate tenure he chaired the committees on Finance, Transportation Routes to the Seaboard, Rules, and the Select Committee on Corporations Organized in the District of Columbia.

=== Federal Reserve Act ===
Following the Panic of 1907, Aldrich took control as chairman of the Congressionally established National Monetary Commission. A proponent of Progressive Era themes of Efficiency and scientific expertise, he led a team of experts to study the European national banks. After his trip, he came to believe that Britain, Germany and France had much superior central banking systems. In November 1910, leading members of the American financial sector, including Paul Warburg, Abram Andrew, Frank A. Vanderlip, and Henry Davison, and members of J.P. Morgan, met on the island in secret to draft legislation for a central bank which would later influence the Federal Reserve Act. Due to the unpopularity of a central bank among Americans, Aldrich recommended the members conceal their identities, advising the bankers to dress as duck hunters and to address each other only by first name.

In 1913 Woodrow Wilson signed into law the Federal Reserve Act patterned after Aldrich's vision, creating the modern Federal Reserve System. The Jekyll Island meeting was not disclosed until 1930, when Senator Carter Glass's claim of credit for the Federal Reserve's structure prompted rebuttals from Warburg and other banking experts.

=== Foreign affairs ===
Aldrich opposed entry into the Spanish–American War, but supported McKinley when it began. He played a central role in winning two-thirds Senate approval of the Treaty of Paris that ended the war, and included annexation of the Philippines. He helped frame the Platt Amendment of 1901, which defined the American role in Cuba. He supported the Panama Canal, but was critical of Roosevelt's general Caribbean policy.

In 1906 Aldrich and other American financiers invested heavily in mines and rubber in the Belgian Congo. They supported Belgium's King Leopold II, who had imposed very harsh labor conditions in the colony.

== Family prominence ==
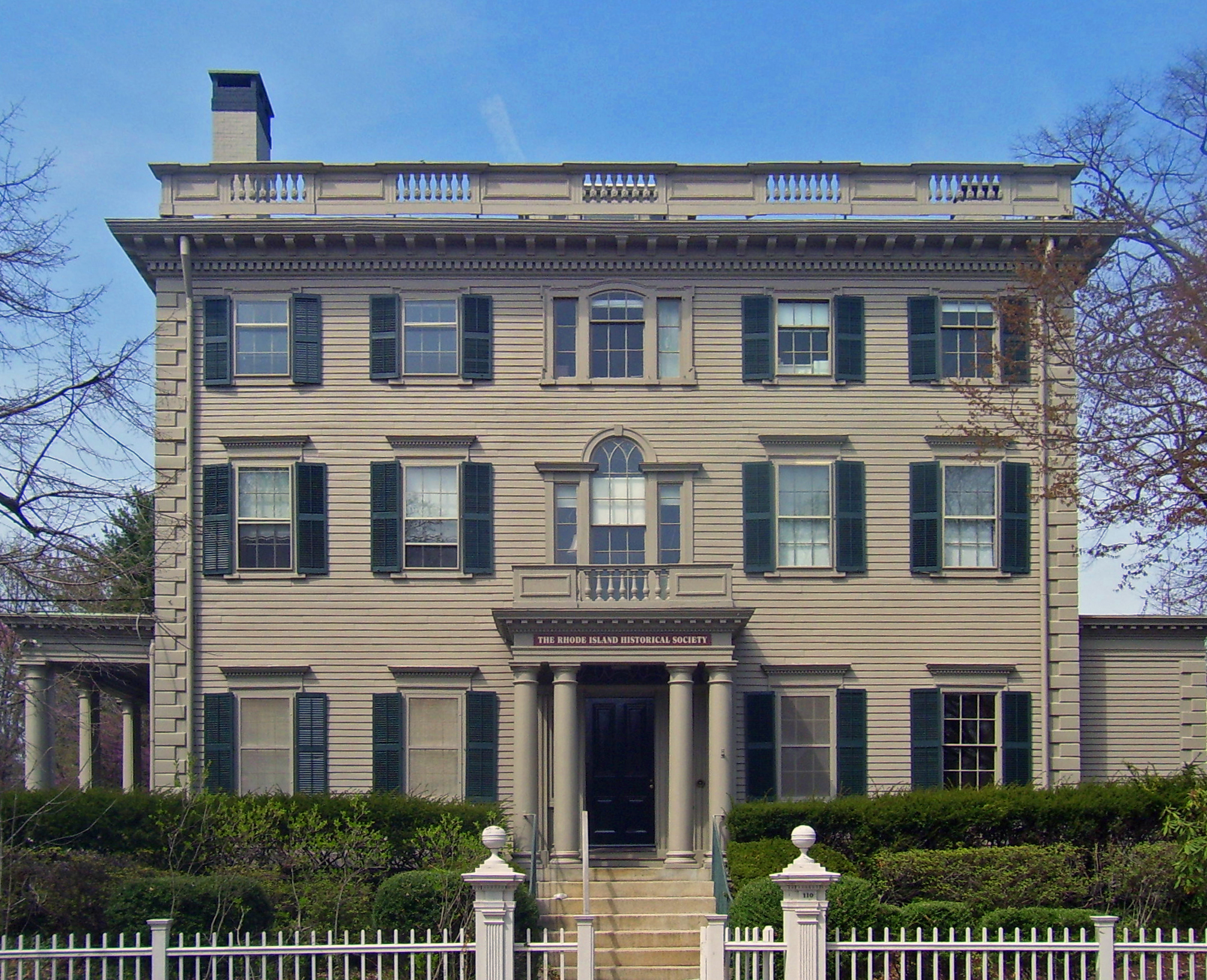
Aldrich's home in Providence, a National Historic Landmark

His daughter Abigail Greene "Abby" Aldrich was a philanthropist who married American philanthropist John Davison Rockefeller Jr. who was the only son of Standard Oil co-founder John D. Rockefeller. Their second son Nelson Aldrich Rockefeller was a four-term Governor of New York who campaigned for the Republican presidential nomination in 1960, 1964, and 1968, and was nominated as Vice President of the United States by President Gerald Ford and confirmed by the Congress in 1974. Aldrich's son Richard S. Aldrich served in Congress from 1923 to 1933, and his son Winthrop Williams Aldrich served as chairman of the Chase National Bank. His grandson David Rockefeller would eventually become the chairman and would become a leading banker. American film director, writer, and producer Robert Aldrich was his grandson.

In addition to his sons Richard and Winthrop, Aldrich had sons Edward Burgess Aldrich (1871–1957), Stuart Morgan Aldrich (1876–1960) and William Truman Aldrich (1880–1966). In addition to Abigail, he had daughters Lucy Truman Aldrich (1869–1955) and Elsie Chapman Aldrich (1888–1968). In addition to the above, Aldrich had two children who died in infancy.

== Interests ==
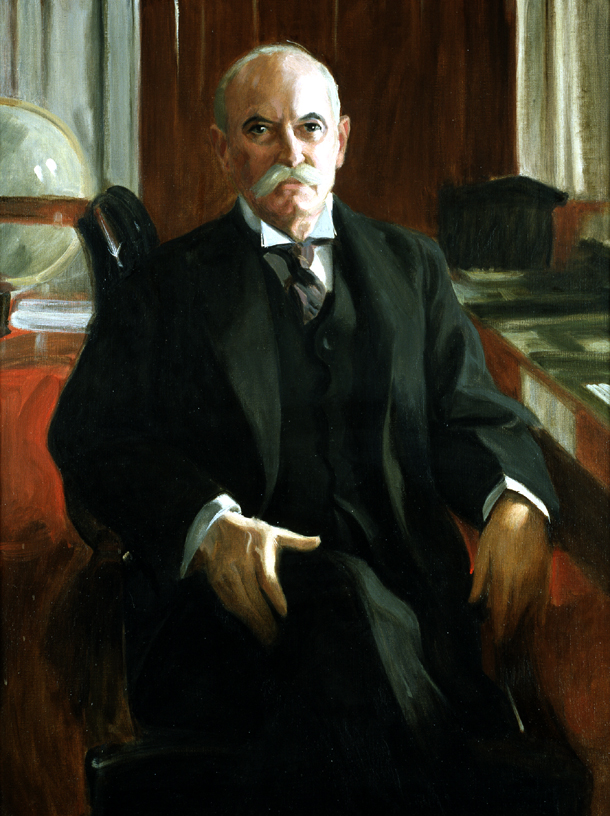
Portrait of Senator Aldrich

Aldrich was very active in the Freemasons and was Treasurer of the Grand Lodge of Rhode Island.

He developed an elaborate country estate in the Warwick Neck section of Warwick, Rhode Island. The estate is now known as the Aldrich Mansion and is owned by the Roman Catholic Diocese of Rhode Island.

== Death and burial ==
He died of a apopleptic stroke at his home on Fifth Avenue in New York City on April 16, 1915. He had been in good health until he suffered an "attack of indigestion" the previous night.

A funeral service held on April 18, led by Bishop James De Wolf Perry at Grace Church in Providence. The honorary pallbearers were former president William Howard Taft, George P. Wetmore, Henry F. Lippitt, Charles P. Briggs, Frank K. Sturgis, George Fisher Baker, and Henry Pomeroy Davison. It was also attended by Senator LeBaron B. Colt, Governor Robert Livingston Beeckman, former governors Charles W. Lippitt, Aram J. Pothier, and Daniel Russell Brown, and former senator Jonathan Chace. He was buried at Providence's Swan Point Cemetery.

== Legacy ==
The Nelson W. Aldrich House on 110 Benevolent Street in Providence serves as the headquarters for the Rhode Island Historical Society.

The Aldrich Middle School in Warwick, Rhode Island is named in his honor.

Aldrich Residence Hall at The University of Rhode Island in Kingston, R.I. is named in his honor.

Aldrich Hall at Harvard Business School in Boston, MA was made possible through a gift from John D. Rockefeller and is named in honor of his father-in-law, Nelson W. Aldrich.

The Nelson W. Aldrich papers are housed at the Rockefeller Archive Center in Sleepy Hollow, New York.

== Congressional committee assignments ==
	Committee	Congresses	Notes
House	District of Columbia	46	
Senate	District of Columbia	47–48	
Senate	Education and Labor	47–48	
Senate	Finance	47–61	Chairman (55–61)
Senate	Steel Producing Capacity of the United States (Select)	48–49	
Senate	Transportation Routes to the Seaboard	48–55	Chairman (48–49)
Senate	Pensions	49	
Senate	Examine the Several Branches of the Civil Service	50–51	
Senate	Rules	50–61	Chairman (50–52; 54; 55)
Senate	Corporations Organized in the District of Columbia	53–60	Chairman of the Select Committee, (53)
Senate	Revolutionary Claims	53–54	
Senate	Interstate Commerce	54–61	
Senate	Cuban Relations	56–60	
Senate	Industrial Expositions	59–60	
Senate	Public Expenditures	61	

U.S. House of Representatives
Preceded by Benjamin T. Eames	Member of the U.S. House of Representatives for Rhode Island's 1st district March 4, 1879 – October 4, 1881	Succeeded by Henry J. Spooner
U.S. Senate
Preceded by Ambrose Burnside	U.S. senator (Class 1) from Rhode Island; October 5, 1881 – March 3, 1911; Served alongside: Henry B. Anthony, William P. Sheffield, Jonathan Chace, Nathan F. Dixon, George Peabody Wetmore	Succeeded by Henry F. Lippitt
Legal offices
Preceded by Justin Morrill; Vermont	Chairman of the U.S. Senate Committee on Finance; 1899–1911	Succeeded by Boies Penrose; Pennsylvania
