= Shiftability theory =

Moving of assets to prevent illiquidity

In banking, shiftability is an approach to keep banks liquid by supporting the shifting of assets. When a bank is short of ready money, it is able to sell or repo its assets to a more liquid bank.

== Commercial loan theory ==
Prior to the concept of shiftability, the orthodox theory of banking limited banks to making short-term commercial loans to help producers of goods during their business cycles. For example, apple farmers may require short-term financing until the crop is ready for sale. This theory postulates that by making short-term commercial transactions that will mature in a timely manner will keep banks in a ready state to meet the demands of their depositors.

== Shiftability ==
Although at the time banking was not a new concept, what had changed was that deposits had become the primary liability of banks. In 1830 the capital of banks was about three times the deposits, but less than one hundred years later depositors had come to represent approximately 68 percent of the equity in banks. This increase in the proportion of deposits had many worried about the possibility of a run on the banks and the inability to get much needed cash.

It was shown that short-term commercial lending oftentimes did not mature or liquidate at maturity due to changing business cycles. Growing opposition began to showcase the need for an improved banking system that could avoid forced liquidation of this short-term paper that came about more or less periodically. It proposed that banks, rather than relying on the liquidity of these assets in a crisis, should be able to shift these earning assets to another institution with a better cash position thereby creating the reserves needed. This ability to shift assets provides liquidity to otherwise non-liquid assets.

The key piece of legislation that led to this reality was the Banking Act of 1935. One of its amendments provided that, a federal reserve bank may discount any commercial, agricultural or industrial paper for liquidity purposes. It also allowed necessary advances to its member banks secured by "any sound asset" that would otherwise be described as ineligible by the orthodox theory to provide bank reserves.

Although there was much resistance to this idea and many believed it would be better to return to pre-war practices, it was Marriner Stoddard Eccles, an author of the Banking Act of 1935, that continued to push that bank asset liquidity in times of stress was dependent on the ability of a Central bank to exchange those assets for currency or credit.

== During a crisis ==
One shortcoming of the shiftability theory, similar to one that led the banking system away from the orthodox theory, was that in times of stress or crisis, the effectiveness of these assets for liquidity purposes goes away as there is no market for them. If all banks are looking to liquidate assets, they are doing so at a cost because it would be difficult to find buyers, meaning lower prices for the assets and ultimately by doing so would not leave the banking system as a whole in a more liquid condition.
