= Banking Act of 1933 =

1933 U.S. banking reform; established the Federal Deposit Insurance Corporation (FDIC)

- Long title: An Act to provide for the safer and more effective use of the assets of banks, to regulate interbank control, to prevent the undue diversion of funds into speculative operations, and for other purposes.
- Nicknames: Banking Act of 1933; Glass–Steagall Act (especially when referring to the separation of commercial and investment banking in Sections 16, 20, 21, and 32)
- Enacted by: the 73rd United States Congress
- Effective: June 16, 1933

Citations
- Public law: Pub. L. 73-66
- Statutes at Large: 48 Stat. 162 (1933)

Codification
- Acts amended: Federal Reserve Act; National Bank Act; Clayton Act

Legislative history
- Introduced in the House of Representatives as H.R. 5661 by Rep. Henry B. Steagall (D-AL) on May 16, 1933; Committee consideration by U.S. House Committee on Banking and Currency; Passed the House on May 23, 1933 (262–19); Passed the Senate with amendment on May 25, 1933 (voice vote); Reported by the joint conference committee on June 12, 1933; agreed to by the Senate on June 13, 1933 (voice vote) and by the House on June 13, 1933 (191–6); Signed into law by President Franklin Delano Roosevelt on June 16, 1933

Major amendments
- Banking Act of 1935; Bank Holding Company Act of 1956; Depository Institutions Deregulation and Monetary Control Act of 1980; Riegle-Neal Interstate Banking and Branching Efficiency Act of 1994; Gramm–Leach–Bliley Act of 1999; Dodd-Frank Wall Street Reform and Consumer Protection Act of 2010

United States Supreme Court cases
- Board of Governors v. Agnew, 329 U.S. 441 (1946); Investment Company Institute v. Camp, 401 U.S. 617 (1970); Board of Governors v. Investment Company Institute, 450 U.S. 46 (1981); Securities Industry Association v. Board of Governors, 468 U.S. 207 (1984)

The Banking Act of 1933 (Pub. L. 73–66, 48 Stat. 162, enacted June 16, 1933) was a statute enacted by the United States Congress that established the Federal Deposit Insurance Corporation (FDIC) and imposed various other banking reforms. The entire law is often referred to as the Glass–Steagall Act, after its Congressional sponsors, Senator Carter Glass (D) of Virginia, and Representative Henry B. Steagall (D) of Alabama. The term "Glass–Steagall Act", however, is most often used to refer to four provisions of the Banking Act of 1933 that limited commercial bank securities activities and affiliations between commercial banks and securities firms. That limited meaning of the term is described in the article on Glass–Steagall Legislation.

The Banking Act of 1933 (the 1933 Banking Act) joined two long-standing Congressional projects:

1. A federal system of bank deposit insurance championed by Representative Steagall
2. The regulation (or prohibition) of the combination of commercial and investment banking and other restrictions on "speculative" bank activities championed by Senator Glass as part of a general desire to "restore" commercial banking to the purposes envisioned by the Federal Reserve Act of 1913.

Although the 1933 Banking Act thus fulfilled Congressional designs and, at least in its deposit insurance provisions, was resisted by the Franklin D. Roosevelt administration, it later became considered part of the New Deal. The deposit insurance and many other provisions of the Act were criticized during Congressional consideration. The entire Act was long-criticized for limiting competition and thereby encouraging an inefficient banking industry. Supporters of the Act cite it as a central cause for an unprecedented period of stability in the U.S. banking system during the ensuing four or, in some accounts, five decades following 1933.

== Creation of FDIC and federal deposit insurance ==
The 1933 Banking Act established (1) the Federal Deposit Insurance Corporation (FDIC); (2) temporary FDIC deposit insurance limited to $2,500 per accountholder starting January 1934 through June 30, 1934; and (3) permanent FDIC deposit insurance starting July 1, 1934, fully insuring $5,000 per accountholder. 1934 legislation delayed the effectiveness of the permanent insurance system. The Banking Act of 1935 repealed the permanent system and replaced it with a system that fully insured balances up to $5,000 and provided no insurance for balances above that amount. Over the years, the limit has been raised which reached up to its current limit of $250,000.

The 1933 Banking Act required all FDIC-insured banks to be, or to apply to become, members of the Federal Reserve System by July 1, 1934. The Banking Act of 1935 extended that deadline to July 1, 1936. State banks were not eligible to be members of the Federal Reserve System until they became stockholders of the FDIC, and thereby became an insured institution. 1939 legislation repealed the requirement that FDIC-insured banks join the Federal Reserve System.

Before 1950, the laws establishing the FDIC and FDIC insurance were part of the Federal Reserve Act. 1950 legislation created the Federal Deposit Insurance Act (FDIA).

== Separation of commercial and investment banking ==
Over time, the term Glass–Steagall Act came to be used most often to refer to four provisions of the 1933 Banking Act that separated commercial banking from investment banking. Congressional efforts to "repeal the Glass–Steagall Act" referred to those four provisions (and then usually to only the two provisions that restricted affiliations between commercial banks and securities firms). Those efforts culminated in the 1999 Gramm-Leach-Bliley Act (GLBA), which repealed the two provisions restricting affiliations between banks and securities firms. The 1933 Banking Act's separation of investment and commercial banking is described in the article on the Glass–Steagall Act. Institutions were given one year to decide whether they wanted to specialize in commercial or investment banking.

== Other provisions of 1933 Banking Act ==
=== Creation of the Federal Open Market Committee ===
The act had a large impact on the Federal Reserve. Notable provisions included the creation of the Federal Open Market Committee (FOMC) under Section 8. However, the 1933 FOMC did not include voting rights for the Federal Reserve Board, which was revised by the Banking Act of 1935 and amended again in 1942 to closely resemble the modern FOMC.

=== Regulation Q ===
To decrease competition between commercial banks and discourage risky investment strategies, the Banking Act of 1933 outlawed the payment of interest on checking accounts and also placed ceilings on the amount of interest that could be paid on other deposits.

=== Regulation of "speculation" ===
Several provisions of the 1933 Banking Act sought to restrict "speculative" uses of bank credit. Section 3(a) required each Federal Reserve Bank to monitor local member bank lending and investment to ensure there was not "undue use" of bank credit for "speculative trading or carrying" of securities, commodities or real estate. Section 7 limited the total amount of loans a member bank could make secured by stocks or bonds and permitted the Federal Reserve Board to impose tighter restrictions and to not limit the total amount of such loans that could be made by member banks in any Federal Reserve district. Section 11(a) prohibited Federal Reserve member banks from acting as agents for nonbanks in placing loans to brokers or dealers. Glass also hoped to put "speculative" credit into more productive sectors of the U.S. economy.

=== Other provisions still in effect ===
Other provisions of the 1933 Banking Act that remain in effect include (1) Sections 5(c) and 27, which required state member banks to provide its district's Federal Reserve Bank and the Federal Reserve Board and national banks to provide the Comptroller of the Currency a minimum of three reports on their affiliates; (2) Section 13, which (as Section 23A of the Federal Reserve Act) regulated transactions between Federal Reserve member banks and their nonbank affiliates; (3) Sections 19 and 30, which established criminal penalties for misconduct by officers or directors of Federal Reserve System member banks and authorized the Federal Reserve to remove such officers or directors; (4) Section 22, which eliminated personal liability ("double liability") for new shareholders of national banks; and (5) Section 23, which gave national banks the same ability to establish branches in their "home state" as state chartered banks in that state.

The 1933 Banking Act gave tighter regulation of national banks to the Federal Reserve which required state member banks and holding companies to make three reports annually. The reports were to be given to their Federal Reserve Board and Federal Reserve Bank.

=== Other provisions repealed or replaced ===
Provisions of the 1933 Banking Act that were later repealed or replaced include (1) Sections 5(c) and 19, which required an owner of more than 50% of a Federal Reserve System member bank's stock to receive a permit from (and submit to inspection by) the Federal Reserve Board to vote that stock (replaced by the Bank Holding Company Act of 1956); (2) Section 8, which established the Federal Open Market Committee (FOMC) made up of representatives from each of the 12 Federal Reserve Banks (revised by the Federal Reserve Board-dominated FOMC established by the Banking Act of 1935 and later amended in 1942); (3) Section 11(b), which prohibited interest payments on demand deposits (repealed by the Dodd-Frank Wall Street Reform and Consumer Protection Act of 2010 and allowing interest-bearing demand accounts beginning July 21, 2011) and authorized the Federal Reserve Board to limit interest rates on time deposits (phased out by the Depository Institutions Deregulation and Monetary Control Act of 1980 by 1986), both of which interest limitations were incorporated into Regulation Q, and (4) Section 12, which prohibited Federal Reserve System member bank loans to their executive officers and required the repayment of outstanding loans (replaced by the 1935 Banking Act's regulation of such loans and modified by later legislation).

== Legislative history ==
=== 1930–1932 Glass bills; Glass Senate subcommittee ===
Between 1930 and 1932 Senator Glass introduced several versions of a bill (known in each version as the Glass bill) to separate commercial and investment banking and to establish other reforms (except deposit insurance) similar to the final provisions of the 1933 Banking Act. Glass had been the House sponsor of the Federal Reserve Act of 1913 (the Glass-Owen Act) and considered himself "the father of the Federal Reserve System". The various versions of his Glass bill consistently sought to (1) expand branch banking and bring more banks and activities under Federal Reserve supervision and (2) separate (or regulate the mix of) commercial and investment banking.

Glass sought to "correct" what he considered to be the "errors" the Federal Reserve System had made in not controlling what he considered "speculative credit" during the 1920s. The Glass bills also sought to avoid deposit insurance by providing for a "Liquidation Corporation", a federal authority to purchase assets of a closed bank based on "an approximately correct valuation of its assets". Glass's idea was for a federal corporation to assume ownership of the assets of failed banks and sell them over time as the market could absorb them, rather than dump assets onto markets with little demand. The bills provided that such payments would be used to make immediate payments to depositors to the extent of the bank's "bona fide assets".

Glass introduced the first Glass bill on June 17, 1930. The bill's language indicated that it was intended as a "tentative measure to serve as a guide" for a subcommittee of the Senate Committee on Banking and Currency (the Glass Subcommittee) chaired by Glass that was authorized to investigate the operations of the National and Federal Reserve banking systems.

On January 25, 1933, during the lame duck session of Congress following the 1932 elections, the Senate passed a version of the Glass bill.

=== Commercial banking theory; unit banks ===
Senator Glass supported a commercial banking theory (associated with the real bills doctrine) that commercial banks should no longer be allowed to underwrite or deal in securities. This theory, defended by Senator Glass's longtime advisor Henry Parker Willis, had served as a foundation for the Federal Reserve Act of 1913 and earlier US banking law. Glass and Willis argued the failure of banks to follow, and of the Federal Reserve to enforce, this theory had resulted in the "excesses" that inevitably led to the Wall Street Crash of 1929 and the Great Depression.

Before and after the Wall Street Crash of 1929 Senator Glass used this commercial banking theory to criticize banks for their involvement in securities markets. Glass condemned banks for lending to stock market "speculators" and for underwriting "risky" or "utterly worthless" securities, particularly foreign securities, that were sold to unsophisticated bank depositors and small "correspondent banks".

Glass opposed direct bank involvement in these activities and indirect involvement through "securities affiliates". Such affiliates were typically owned by the same shareholders as the bank, with the affiliate's shares held in a "voting trust" or other device that ensured bank management controlled the affiliate. Glass and Willis viewed such affiliates as artificial devices to evade limits on bank activities. Large banks such as National City Bank (predecessor to Citibank) and Chase National Bank typically used such securities affiliates to underwrite securities.

Glass and Willis criticized all forms of "illiquid loans" including bank real estate lending. They were, however, especially critical of bank securities activities. Willis identified bank investments in, and loans to finance purchases of, government securities during World War I as the beginning of the corruption of commercial banking that culminated in the "speculative excesses" of the 1920s.

Glass and Willis also identified the "unit banking" system of small, single office banks as a basic weakness of U.S. banking. The Glass bills tried to limit banks to their "proper" commercial banking activities and to permit banks to expand their geographic operations through greater permission for branch banking.

Additionally, many small banks were not able to profit in the securities business, leading many small banks to push for deposit insurance. However, many large banks opposed deposit insurance because "they expected deposits running off from small, weak country banks to come to them". Overall, most banks opposed deposit insurance, small banks and large banks, and public opinion was the main factor pushing for the policy.

=== Unit banks, Federal Reserve System, and deposit insurance ===
Following his defeat in the 1932 presidential election, President Herbert Hoover supported the Glass bill. In 1932 Hoover had delayed Congressional action on the Glass bill by requesting further hearings and (according to Willis) by working to delay Senate consideration of revised versions of the Glass bill introduced after those hearings.

In the 1933 "lame duck" session of the 72nd United States Congress, the final obstacle to Senate passage came from supporters of small "unit banks" (i.e., single office banks). They opposed the Glass bill's permission for national banks to branch throughout their "home state" and into neighboring states as far as a 50-mile "area of trade".

Even in the extended period of economic prosperity in the 1920s, a large number of "unit banks" in agricultural areas failed as agricultural prices declined. During the Great Depression unit bank failures grew. Willis and others noted that there were no significant bank failures in Canada, despite similar bad economic conditions. Canada permitted branch banking (which had led to a system of large, nationwide banks), but otherwise shared the U.S. system of "commercial banking" distinct from the "universal banks" common in Europe and elsewhere in the world. Glass stated he had originally supported the "little bank" but as so many unit banks failed, he concluded they were a "menace" to "sound banking" and a "curse" to their depositors.

Glass also wanted Federal Reserve supervision of all banks under a "unified banking system". Glass stated "the curse of the banking system for this country is the dual system" under which states could charter banks that were supervised by state officials outside the Federal Reserve System. Under the Federal Reserve Act, all national banks were required to be members of the Federal Reserve System, but state chartered banks could choose whether to join. Glass and others concluded that this had led to a "competition in laxity" between regulators of member and non-member banks.

In opposition to the Glass bill's branch banking provisions, Senator Huey Long (D-LA) filibustered the Glass bill until Glass revised his bill to limit national bank branching rights to states that permitted their own banks to branch. Glass also revised his bill to extend the deadline for banks to dispose of securities affiliates from three to five years. With those changes, the Glass bill passed the Senate in an overwhelming 54–9 vote on January 25, 1933.

In the House of Representatives, Representative Steagall opposed even the revised Glass bill with its limited permission for branch banking. Steagall wanted to protect unit banks, and bank depositors, by establishing federal deposit insurance, thereby eliminating the advantage larger, more financially secure banks had in attracting deposits.

150 separate bills providing some form of federal deposit insurance had been introduced in the United States Congress since 1886. The House had passed a federal deposit insurance bill on May 27, 1932, that was awaiting Senate action during the 1933 "lame duck" session.

After several states had closed their banks in what became the banking crisis of 1933, President Hoover issued a February 20, 1933, plea to the House of Representatives to pass the Glass bill as the "first constructive step to remedy the prime weakness of our whole economic life". On March 4, 1933, however, the lame duck session of the 72nd Congress adjourned without either the Glass bill or the House deposit insurance bill becoming law. On the same day, the Senate reconvened in a special session called by President Hoover and Franklin Delano Roosevelt was inaugurated as the new president.

=== 1933 extraordinary session of Congress ===
==== Glass bills ====
President Roosevelt called both Houses of Congress into "extraordinary session" on March 9, 1933, to enact the Emergency Banking Act that ratified Roosevelt's emergency closing of all banks on March 6, 1933. On March 11, 1933, Senator Glass reintroduced (as S. 245) his Glass bill revised to require banks to eliminate securities affiliates within 2 years rather than the 5 years permitted by the compromised version of the Glass bill the Senate had passed in January. Roosevelt told Glass he approved most of the bill, including the separation of commercial and investment banking, that he shared Glass's desire for a "unified banking system" with state and national banks regulated by a single authority, but that he only approved countywide, not statewide, branch banking, and that he opposed deposit insurance.

On March 7, 1933, National City Bank (predecessor to Citibank) had announced it would liquidate its security affiliate. The next day, Winthrop Aldrich, the newly named chairman and president of Chase National Bank, announced Chase would do the same and that Chase supported prohibiting banks from having securities affiliates. Aldrich also called for prohibiting securities firms from taking deposits. According to Aldrich and his biographer, Aldrich (a lawyer) drafted new language for Glass's bill that became Section 21 of the Glass–Steagall Act. Contemporary observers suggested Aldrich's proposal was aimed at J.P. Morgan & Co. A later Glass–Steagall critic cited Aldrich's involvement as evidence the Rockefellers (who controlled Chase) had used Section 21 to keep J.P. Morgan & Co. (a deposit taking private partnership best known for underwriting securities) from competing with Chase in the commercial banking business.

After Glass introduced S. 245, he chaired a subcommittee that considered the bill and prepared a revised version while negotiating at length with the Roosevelt Administration to gain its support for the bill. By April 13, 1933, the subcommittee had prepared a revised Glass bill, but delayed submitting the bill to the full Senate Committee on Banking and Currency to continue negotiations with the Roosevelt Administration. President Roosevelt had declared on March 8, 1933, in his first press conference, that he opposed a guarantee of bank deposits for making the government responsible for the "mistakes and errors of individual banks" and for putting "a premium on unsound banking". Glass had reluctantly accepted that no banking reform bill would pass Congress without deposit insurance, but President Roosevelt and Treasury Secretary William Woodin continued to resist such insurance during their negotiations with the Senate subcommittee.

On April 25, 1933, Roosevelt asked for two weeks to consider the deposit insurance issue. In early May, Roosevelt announced with Glass and Steagall that they had agreed "in principle" on a bill.

On May 10, 1933, Glass introduced his revised bill (S. 1631) in the Senate. The most important change was a new provision for deposit insurance. Glass had opposed deposit insurance throughout his career in Congress. As Roosevelt demanded, deposit insurance was based on a sliding scale. Deposit balances above $10,000 would only be partially insured. As Roosevelt had suggested, deposit insurance would not begin for one year. Glass limited the deposit insurance to Federal Reserve System member banks in the hope this would indirectly lead to a "unified banking system" as the attraction of deposit insurance would lead banks to become Federal Reserve members.

Aside from the new federal deposit insurance system, S. 1631 added provisions based on earlier versions of the Glass bill that became Sections 21 (prohibiting securities firms from taking deposits) and 32 (prohibiting common directors or employees for securities firms and banks) of the Glass–Steagall Act.

==== Steagall bill ====
On May 16, 1933, Representative Steagall introduced H.R. 5661, which became the vehicle through which the 1933 Banking Act became law. This bill largely adopted provisions of the new Glass bill. Reflecting Steagall's support for the "dual banking system", however, H.R. 5661 permitted state-chartered banks to receive federal deposit insurance without joining the Federal Reserve System.

On May 23, 1933, the House passed H.R. 5661 in a 262–19 vote. On May 25, 1933, the Senate approved H.R. 5661 (in a voice vote) after substituting the language of S. 1631 (amended to shorten to one year the time within which banks needed to eliminate securities affiliates) and requested a House and Senate conference to reconcile differences between the two versions of H.R. 5661.

==== Banking Act of 1933 ====
The final Senate version of H.R. 5661 included Senator Arthur Vandenberg's (R-MI) amendment providing for an immediate temporary fund to insure fully deposits up to $2,500 before the FDIC began operating on July 1, 1934. The "Vandenberg Amendment" was added to the Senate bill through a procedural maneuver supported by Vice President John Nance Garner, who was over the Senate in a judicial impeachment proceeding. This highlighted the differences between Garner and Roosevelt on the controversial issue of deposit insurance.

Roosevelt threatened to veto any bill that included the Vandenberg Amendment's provision for immediate deposit insurance. On June 7, however, Roosevelt indicated to Glass he would accept a compromise in which permanent FDIC insurance would not begin until July 1934, the limited temporary plan would begin on January 1, 1934, and state banks could be insured so long as they joined the Federal Reserve System by 1936. Roosevelt, like Glass, saw redeeming value in deposit insurance if its requirement for Federal Reserve System membership led to "unifying the banking system".

The Roosevelt Administration had wanted Congress to adjourn its "extraordinary session" on June 10, 1933, but the Senate blocked the planned adjournment. This provided more time for the House and Senate Conference Committee to reconcile differences between the two versions of H.R. 5661. In the House, nearly one-third of the Representatives signed a pledge not to adjourn without passing a bill providing federal deposit insurance.

After Steagall and other House members met with Roosevelt on June 12, 1933, the Conference Committee filed its final report for H.R. 5661. Closely tracking the principles Roosevelt had described to Glass on June 7, the Conference Report provided that permanent deposit insurance would begin July 1, 1934, temporary insurance would begin January 1, 1934, unless the President proclaimed an earlier start date, and state non-member banks could be insured, but after July 1, 1936, would only remain insured if they had applied for Federal Reserve System membership

Although opponents of H.R. 5661 hoped Roosevelt would veto the final bill, he called Senator Glass with congratulations after the Senate passed the bill. Roosevelt signed H.R. 5661 into law on June 16, 1933, as the Banking Act of 1933. Roosevelt called the new law "the most important" banking legislation since the Federal Reserve Act of 1913.

== Commentator description and evaluation of 1933 Banking Act ==
=== Roosevelt's role in 1933 Banking Act ===
Time Magazine reported the 1933 Banking Act passed by "accident because a Presidential blunder kept Congress in session four days longer than expected." H. Parker Willis described Roosevelt as treating the final bill with "indifference" but not "hostility".

In his account of the "First New Deal" Raymond Moley stated Roosevelt was "sympathetic" to the 1933 Banking Act "but had no active part in pressing for its passage". Moley also wrote that most of "the people who were close to the White House were so busy with their own legislative programs that Glass was left to his own devices."

Adolf A. Berle, like Moley a member of Roosevelt's First New Deal Brain Trust, was "disappointed" by the 1933 Banking Act. He wished the more extensive branch banking permission in earlier Glass bills had been adopted. Berle concluded that limited branch banking with deposit insurance would preserve small banks certain to fail in an economic downturn, as they had consistently in the past. While Berle shared Glass's hope that the new law's deposit insurance provisions would force all banks into the Federal Reserve System, he correctly feared that future Congresses would remove this requirement.

According to Carter Golembe, the Banking Act of 1933 was the "only important piece of legislation during the New Deal's famous "one hundred days" which was neither requested nor supported by the new administration." In their books on banking events in 1933, Susan Eastabrook Kennedy and Helen Burns concluded that, although the 1933 Banking Act was not part of the New Deal, Roosevelt ultimately preferred it to no banking reform bill even though it did not provide the more "far reaching" reforms (Kennedy) or "fuller solution" (Burns) he sought. Both present Roosevelt as being influenced by the strong public demand for deposit insurance in accepting the final bill. Both also describe the Banking Act of 1935 as being more significant than the 1933 Banking Act.

Kennedy notes that after the 1933 Banking Act became law Roosevelt "claimed full credit, to the amusement or outrage of contemporary and hindsighted observers".

Roosevelt's concerns with the 1933 Banking Act were not tied to what later became known as the "Glass–Steagall" separation of investment and commercial banking. The 1932 Democratic Party platform provisions on banking (drafted by Senator Glass) called for that separation. In a campaign speech Roosevelt specifically endorsed such separation. In 1935 President Roosevelt opposed Glass's effort to restore national bank powers to underwrite corporate securities. Roosevelt confirmed to Glass in March 1933, that he supported the separation of commercial and investment banking, although Treasury Secretary Woodin feared that prohibiting bank underwriting of securities would "dampen recovery".

=== Accounts describing 1933 Banking Act as New Deal legislation ===
Despite the Congressional origins of, and President Roosevelt's lack of support for, the 1933 Banking Act, many descriptions of the New Deal or of the 1933 Banking Act refer to the Act as New Deal legislation.

In the prologue to his classic account of the New Deal, Arthur M. Schlesinger Jr. suggests Felix Frankfurter and his colleagues were the source for the 1933 Banking Act (along with the Securities Act of 1933) in the tradition of "trust-busting liberalism". In that book's later brief description of the 1933 Banking Act, however, Schlesinger does not mention Frankfurter and focuses on the role of the Pecora Investigation and opposition to deposit insurance, including from Roosevelt, in the debate over the legislation.

The Commerce Clearing House explanation of the Gramm-Leach-Bliley Act quoted Roosevelt as calling the 1933 Banking Act "the most important and far-reaching legislation ever enacted by the American Congress." Roosevelt made that statement about the National Industrial Recovery Act on the same day he signed the 1933 Banking Act.

=== Glass–Steagall provisions and the Pecora Investigation ===
Many descriptions of the 1933 Banking Act emphasize the role of the Pecora Investigation in creating a public demand for the separation of commercial and investment banking. Some accounts even suggest those Glass–Steagall provisions were created in response to the Pecora Investigation.

National City Bank (predecessor to Citibank) was the only commercial bank examined by Ferdinand Pecora before the 1933 Banking Act became law in June 1933. After the National City hearings ended on March 2, 1933, the Pecora Investigation resumed in May 1933, with the examination of "private bankers", covering J.P. Morgan & Co., Kuhn, Loeb & Co., and Dillon, Read & Co., before returning to a commercial bank with the examination of Chase National Bank beginning in late October 1933. Although those hearings, therefore, took place after the 1933 Banking Act became law, testimony from the lengthy Chase hearings is often cited as evidence for the need to separate commercial and investment banking.

Pecora was appointed counsel for what became known as the Pecora Investigation on January 22, 1933, and conducted his first hearing on February 15, 1933. Earlier, on January 27, 1933, the Senate overwhelmingly passed a Glass bill separating commercial and investment banking. Even earlier, at Glass's instigation, the 1932 Democratic Party platform had called for such separation. During the 1932 Presidential campaign then President Hoover supported the regulation of investment banking, particularly securities affiliates of commercial banks, and Roosevelt supported the separation of commercial and investment banking.

The dramatic "ten days" of National City hearings in February 1933, however, were a high point of publicity for the Pecora Investigation. They led to Charles Mitchell's resignation as Chairman of National City Bank. Days later, both National City and Chase announced they would eliminate their securities affiliates. Chase also announced it supported a legislative separation of commercial and investment banking.

H. Parker Willis and others have written that the Pecora Investigation hearings concerning J. P. Morgan & Co., which began on May 23, 1933, gave the "final impetus" to the 1933 Banking Act. Those hearings did not deal with commercial bank securities activities. Their revelations were that several J. P. Morgan partners had not paid income taxes in one or more years from 1930 to 1932 and that the firm had provided exclusive investment opportunities to prominent business and political leaders.

During the J. P. Morgan hearings Senator Glass dismissed the Pecora Investigation as a "circus"."Bored by Senatorial exhibitionism" Glass had not attended the earlier National City hearings.

While the Pecora Investigation made dramatic headlines and generated public outrage, critics at the time and since attacked the hearings for creating misleading or inaccurate accounts of the investigated transactions. Glass–Steagall critics have argued that the evidence from the Pecora Investigation did not support the separation of commercial and investment banking.

=== H. Parker Willis and Carter Glass on Banking Act of 1933 ===
In 1935, H. Parker Willis wrote that the 1933 Banking Act was "already outdated" when it became law. He wrote that earlier Glass bills could have "made a difference" if they had become law in 1932.

Carter Glass became dissatisfied with the 1933 Banking Act's separation of commercial and investment banking. In 1935 he sponsored a bill passed by the Senate that would have permitted national banks to underwrite corporate bonds.

=== Conservative nature of Banking Act of 1933 ===
Carter Golembe (addressing the FDIC insurance provisions) and Helen Garten (addressing the Glass–Steagall separation of investment and commercial banking and the FDIC insurance provisions) describe the 1933 Banking Act as legislation intended to protect the existing banking system dominated by small "unit banks". Garten labels this a "conservative" action at a time when there was serious consideration of nationalizing banks or of permitting a consolidated banking system through nationwide branch banking. Golembe saw deposit insurance as a compromise between forces that sought to stop the destruction of the "circulating medium" (i.e., bank deposits, particularly checking accounts) and forces that wanted to preserve the existing bank structure made up of a large number of geographically isolated banks.

After the closing of banks nationwide in early March 1933, press reports and public statements by Congressional leaders suggested banks might be nationalized or the existing system of "dual banking" might be eliminated through federal legislation, or even a Constitutional amendment, to prohibit state chartering of banks. Others proposed requiring all banks to join the Federal Reserve System. None of these proposals was contained in the 1933 Banking Act, although the Act's FDIC insurance provisions would have required banks to join the Federal Reserve System to retain deposit insurance.

According to Helen Burns "Roosevelt met with severe criticism from the liberals and the progressives for not nationalizing the banks during the period of crisis." She states, "there seems little doubt that he could have done this" but she also concludes Roosevelt "did not believe in a government-owned and-operated bank" and was ultimately pragmatic or even conservative in his approach to banking legislation.

As described above, Adolf Berle, the 1933 Roosevelt Brain Trust's leading authority on banking law, was "disappointed" by the 1933 Banking Act. He wished it had not been so heavily compromised to satisfy Representative Steagall (a "half portion" of what the Glass bill originally sought). Berle argued the United States needed a "unified banking system" (most likely through the Federal Reserve System) that would perform more like the nationwide branch bank systems in Australia, Canada, and the United Kingdom (which otherwise all shared the U.S. "commercial banking" tradition). Berle supported separating commercial banking from other activities, but disagreed with the Winthrop Aldrich position, contained in Glass–Steagall's Section 21, that this should also apply to "private bankers". Berle suggested that required a "separate study".

=== Fate of 1933 Banking Act as "traditional bank regulation" ===
Helen Garten describes the 1933 Banking Act as exemplifying the form and function of "traditional bank regulation" based on limiting bank activities and protecting banks from competition. The Act established the traditional bank regulation of separating commercial from investment banking, limiting deposit interest rate competition through rate limitations, and restricting competition for deposits based on financial strength by insuring depositors. It also ratified the existing policy of limited branch banking, thereby limiting competition among banks geographically. The resulting "government-enforced cartel in banking" allowed commercial banks to earn "high profits and avoid undue risk" until nonbanking companies found ways to offer substitutes for bank loans and deposits.

Supporters of this traditional banking regulation argue that the 1933 Banking Act (and other restrictive banking legislation) produced a period of unparalleled financial stability. David Moss argues this stability may have induced a false belief in the inherent stability of the financial system. Moss argues this false belief encouraged legislative and regulatory relaxations of traditional restrictions and that this led to financial instability.

Earlier critics of the 1933 Banking Act, and of other restrictive banking regulation, argued it has not prevented the return of financial instability beginning in the mid-1960s. Hyman Minsky, a supporter of traditional banking regulation, described the 1966 return of financial instability (and its increasingly intense return in 1970, 1974, and 1980) as the inevitable result of private financial markets, previously repressed by memories of the Great Depression. Minsky proposed further controls of finance to limit the creation of "liquidity" and to "promote smaller and simpler organizations weighted more toward direct financing".

Commentators argued traditional banking regulation contained the "seeds of its own destruction" by "distorting competition" and "creating gaps between cost and price". In particular, by establishing "cartel profits" traditional bank regulation led nonbank competitors to develop products that could compete with bank deposits and loans to gain part of such profits. Instead of financial stability inducing deregulation and financial instability after 1980, as later suggested by David Moss and Elizabeth Warren, Thomas Huertas and other critics of traditional bank regulation argued Regulation Q limits on interest rates (mandated by the 1933 Banking Act) created the "disintermediation" that began in the 1960s, led to the phase-out of Regulation Q through the Depository Institutions Deregulation and Monetary Control Act of 1980, and opened banking to greater competition.

Jan Kregel accepts that "supporters of free-market liberalism" were correct in describing "competitive innovations" of nonbanks as breaking down the "inefficiencies of a de facto cartel" established by the 1933 Banking Act but argues the "disintegration of the protection" provided banks was "as much due to the conscious decisions of regulators and legislators to weaken and suspend the protections of the Act."

== See also ==
- 2008 financial crisis
- American International Group
- Arthur Vandenberg
- Commodity Futures Modernization Act of 2000
- Corporate Law
- Subprime mortgage crisis
- Systemic risk
- Banking Act of 1933 and 1935 - created and gave voting rights to the 7 Federal Reserve Board of Governors appointed by the president, there are a total of 12 FOMC members.
- Causes of the Great Depression#Trying to return to the Gold Standard — tight monetary policy to return to the gold standards after World War I caused the great depression
