= Marian W. Clarke =

American politician (1880–1953)

Marian Williams Clarke
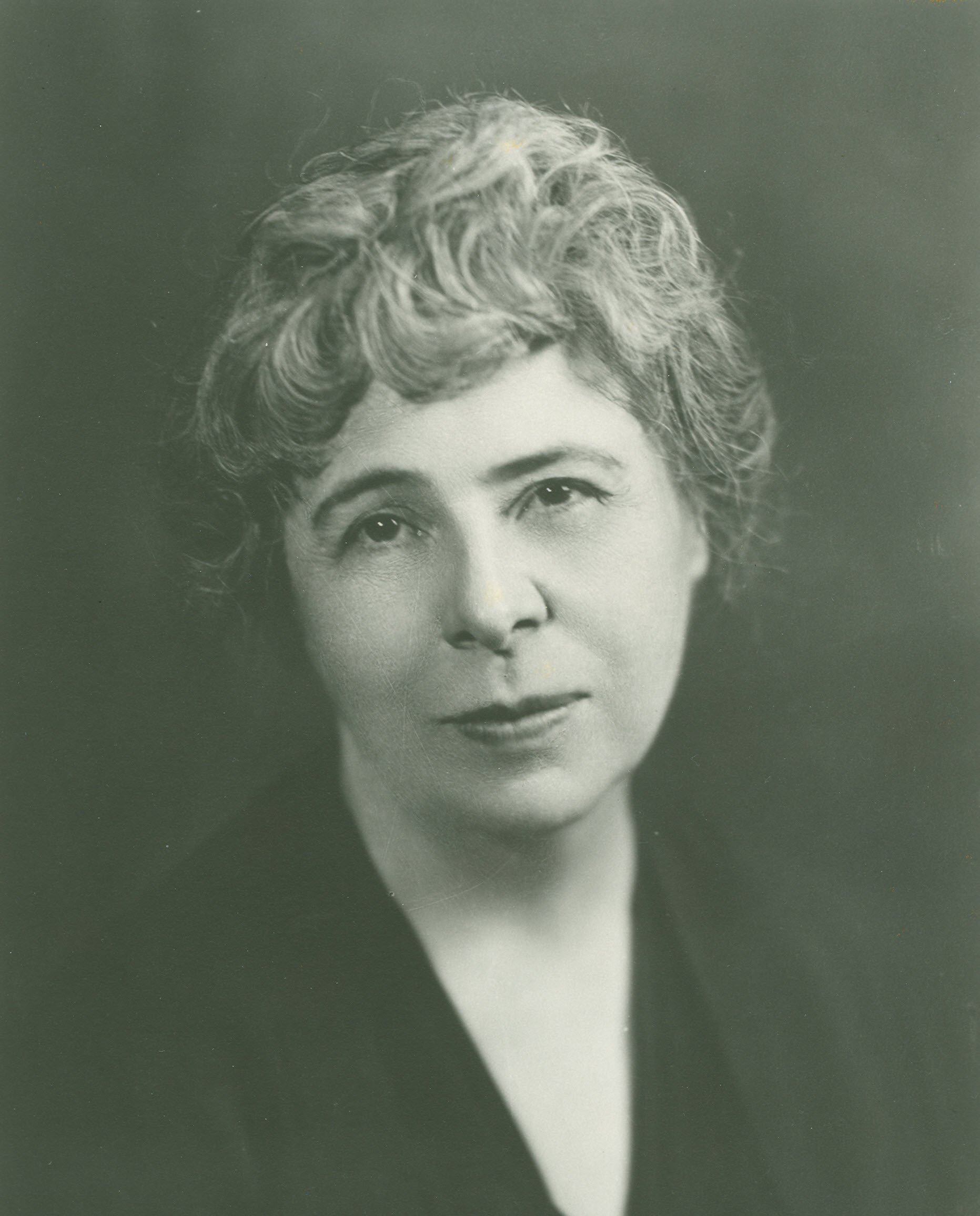

Member of the U.S. House of Representatives from New York's 34th district
- In office December 28, 1933 – January 3, 1935
- Preceded by: John D. Clarke
- Succeeded by: Bert Lord

Personal details
- Born: July 29, 1880 Standing Stone, Pennsylvania, U.S.
- Died: April 8, 1953 (aged 72) Cooperstown, New York, U.S.
- Party: Republican
- Spouse: John D. Clarke
- Education: University of Nebraska, Colorado College

Marian Clarke (née Williams; July 29, 1880 – April 8, 1953) was a Republican member of the United States House of Representatives from New York. She was the second woman elected to Congress from New York, after Ruth Baker Pratt.

== Biography ==
Clarke was born in Standing Stone, Pennsylvania. She attended the University of Nebraska art school for a year, before she graduated from Colorado College in Colorado Springs, Colorado in 1902. She was elected to Congress in 1933 to fill the vacancy caused by the death of her husband John Davenport Clarke who had died in a car crash on November 5, 1933. She served from December 28, 1933, until January 3, 1935, withdrawing her nomination for reelection prior to the primary of 1934. She died in Cooperstown, New York. She is interred at the Locust Hill Cemetery in Hobart, NY.

== See also ==
- Women in the United States House of Representatives

U.S. House of Representatives
Preceded by John D. Clarke	Member of the U.S. House of Representatives from New York's 34th congressional district 1933–1935	Succeeded by Bert Lord
