= United States Senate Committee on Rules =

The United States Senate Committee on Rules was a Congressional committee, later absorbed into the United States Senate Committee on Rules and Administration.

== History ==
The Committee was first created as the Select Committee to Revise the Rules of the Senate on December 3, 1867. On December 9, 1874, it became a standing committee. On January 2, 1947, it was absorbed into the United States Senate Committee on Rules and Administration along with four other committees.

== Chairmen of the Senate Committee on Rules, 1874-1947 ==
- Thomas Ferry (R-MI) 1874-1877
- James G. Blaine (R-ME) 1877-1879
- John T. Morgan (D-AL) 1879-1881
- William P. Frye (R-ME) 1881-1887
- Nelson W. Aldrich (R-RI) 1887-1893
- Joseph C. S. Blackburn (D-KY) 1893-1895
- Nelson W. Aldrich (R-RI) 1895-1899
- John C. Spooner (R-WI) 1899-1907
- Philander C. Knox (R-PA) 1907-1909
- W. Murray Crane (R-MA) 1909-1913
- Lee S. Overman (D-NC) 1913-1919
- Philander C. Knox (R-PA) 1919-1921
- Charles Curtis (R-KS) 1921-1929
- George H. Moses (R-NH) 1929-1933
- Royal S. Copeland (D-NY) 1933-1936
- Matthew M. Neely (D-WV) 1936-1941
- Harry F. Byrd (D-VA) 1941-1947
