= United States Senate Committee on Corporations Organized in the District of Columbia =

The United States Senate Committee on Corporations Organized in the District of Columbia was formed as a select committee in 1892, and became a standing committee in 1896. In 1921, it was abolished.

Robert M. La Follette had the distinction of chairing the committee during the 63rd through the 65th Congress, even though he was a member of the minority Republican Party. This was because the Senate had 73 standing committees in the 63rd Congress, several more than there were Democrats to chair them. Therefore, some members of the minority party were allowed to chair certain minor committees.

== Chairmen of the Select Committee on Corporations Organized in the District of Columbia, 1892–1896 ==
- Arthur P. Gorman (D-MD) 1892–1893
- Nelson W. Aldrich (R-RI) 1893–1895
- James K. Jones (D-AR) 1895–1896

== Chairmen of the Committee on Corporations Organized in the District of Columbia, 1896–1921 ==
- James K. Jones (D-AR) 1896–1897
- John W. Daniel (D-VA) 1897–1899
- Donelson Caffery (D-LA) 1899–1901
- Thomas S. Martin (D-VA) 1901–1905
- Samuel McEnery (D-LA) 1905–1908
- Hernando D. Money (D-MS) 1908–1909
- James P. Taliaferro (D-FL) 1909–1911
- Francis G. Newlands (D-NV) 1911–1912
- William J. Stone (D-MO) 1912–1913
- Robert M. La Follette (R-WI) 1913–1919
- Atlee Pomerene (D-OH) 1919–1921
