= Double liability =

Double liability is a legal status where a person is financially liable for twice their investment's value, including their investment. It was historically used in Canada and the United States.

== Definition ==
Double liability is a situation in which a shareholder's financial liability is fixed to their investment, plus an additional amount equal up to their investment's value. The company's assets through the shareholder's stock are liquidated to pay creditors, and if insufficient, the shareholder has to pay an amount equal up to the same value of his stock.

In other words, the shareholder is "individually liable to the amount of their share".

== History ==
=== Canada ===
In the event of the property and assets of the bank being insufficient to pay its debts and liabilities, each shareholder of the bank shall be liable for the deficiency to an amount equal to the par value of the shares held by him, in addition to any amount not paid up on such shares.

— The Bank Act and amendments (1900), Section 89

In 1830, the British Privy Council for Trade adopted a resolution that applied double liability to colonial bank charters of new banks and to new shares of existing banks in Upper Canada. It was only made effective in 1841. In 1841 three banks of Lower Canada and in 1842 two banks of Upper Canada had to include double liability in their renewed charters.

The six banks organized under the Free Banking Act of 1850 were required to have double liability to issue stock.

The Bank Acts of 1870 and 1871 added double liability to the shareholders of the then 28 banks in operation. The added liability could now be collected before debts owed to the bank and before the sale of bank property.

Under the Bank Act of 1934, the proportion of additional liability to be paid is limited to the proportion of maximum issuable notes to the bank's paid-up capital.

=== United States ===
For all debts, contracted by such association for circulation, deposits, or otherwise, each shareholder shall be liable to the amount, at their par value, of the shares held by him in addition to the amount invested in such shares.

— National Bank Act of 1863, Section 12

Some states applied double liability to all corporate shareholders. Some banks also had double liability in their charter provisions. In 1811, a Massachusetts law imposed double liability to bank shareholders after losses caused by mismanagement, becoming the first state to add double liability as a general regulation. New York adopted an amendment to its Constitution in 1846 imposing double liability on bank shareholders of banks that issued notes or paper credits. Such provisions became much more common by the time of the American Civil War.

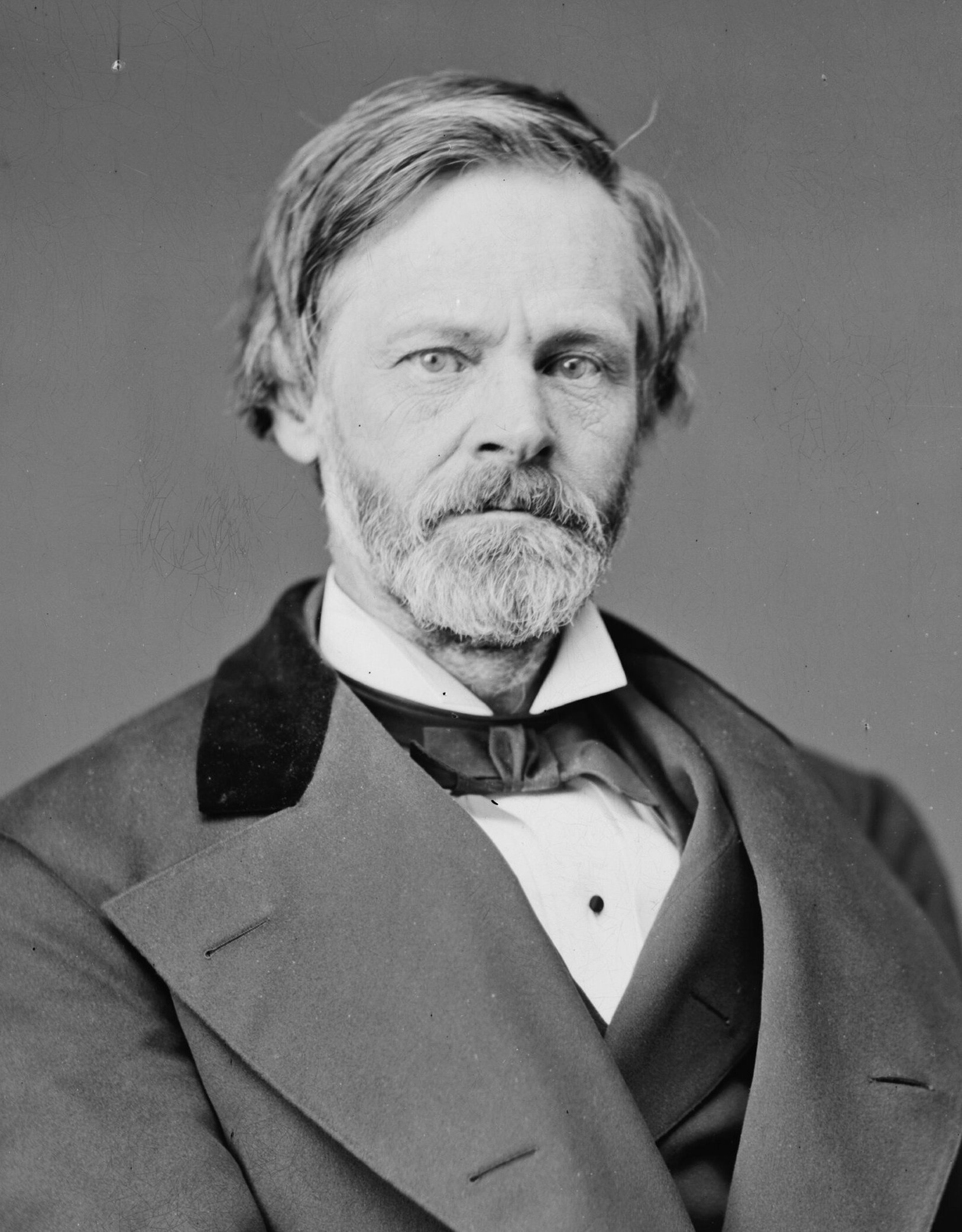
Senator John Sherman

In 1863, the National Banking Act was enacted, thus creating a system of national banks with double liability. The provision adding double liability was suggested by Senator John Sherman, who reasoned that adding double liability followed most states' laws and provided creditors "something more than the stock to fall back upon". A year later, he added that double liability avoided hazardous management of banks by shareholders and directors. The provision adding double liability was modeled on New York's laws.

A 1864 revision to the National Bank Act established that shareholders were only liable for their own proportional share of the debt, even if other shareholders were insolvent or unreachable.

The Act of December 23, 1913 creating the federal reserve system made shareholders individually liable for all debts up to the amount prescribed by double liability.

After the implementation of the National Bank Act, states gradually adopted double liability for their state banks, and by 1931, only Alabama, Connecticut, Delaware, Louisiana, Massachusetts, Missouri, New Jersey, Rhode Island, Vermont and Virginia did not have double liability.

==== Downfall ====
Double liability was brought down after the mass failure of banks during the Great Depression. Shareholders were seen as innocents unfairly harmed by double liability. In recent years, bank shares had been acquired by the public, who was not connected to the bank by family or employment and did not take part in the bank's management. Many people had bought shares without seriously considering their eventual liability after the bank's potential failure. Many shareholders had died, and the burden of double liability fell on their widows and children.

Double liability was also seen as having failed its purpose of protecting the public. The fund were not immediately available, and many shareholders were not able to pay their double liability or were reluctant to. Collectibility on national bank shareholders never reached 50%.

In addition, the federal deposit insurance of the Banking Act of 1933 was seen as a superior alternative to double liability to fix banking's problems - as supported by its effectiveness in stopping bank runs.

Double liability was abolished for national bank shares issued after 16 June by 1933 amendments of the National Bank Act and the Federal Reserve Act, and in 1935 permission was given for national banks to abolish double liability on the condition that they provided a six-month notice of termination after 1 July 1937. By 1953, only 25 national banks still had double liability. In this same year, double liability was fully abolished by Congress for national banks.

On the state level, legislatures started dismantling double liability in 1930, and by 1944, 31 states had abolished it. The last state with mandatory double liability for state bank shareholders was Arizona, which amended its constitution to allow banks to remove double liability in September 1956.

As of 1957, however, 96 banks in 14 states still had additional liability (including double liability). Qualified individual liability (including qualified double liability) still existed in 25 states.

== Triple liability ==
With triple liability, shareholders are liable for the amount of their investment, plus twice that amount. Triple liability existed for Colorado's bank shareholders.
