= Aldrich–Vreeland Act =

1908 United States law creating the National Monetary Commission

- Other short titles: National Bank Circulation Act of 1908
- Long title: An Act to amend the national banking laws.
- Nicknames: National Bank Laws Amendment of 1908
- Enacted by: the 60th United States Congress
- Effective: May 30, 1908

Citations
- Public law: Pub. L. 60–169
- Statutes at Large: 35 Stat. 546

Codification
- Titles amended: 12 U.S.C.: Banks and Banking
- U.S.C. sections created: 12 U.S.C. ch. 2 § 104

Legislative history
- Introduced in the House as H.R. 21871 by Edward B. Vreeland (R–NY) on April 20, 1908; Committee consideration by House Finance, Senate Finance; Passed the House on May 14, 1908 (185-145); Passed the Senate on May 15, 1908 (47-20); Agreed to by the House on May 27, 1908 (166-140) and by the Senate on May 29, 1908 (35-8); Signed into law by President Theodore Roosevelt on May 30, 1908

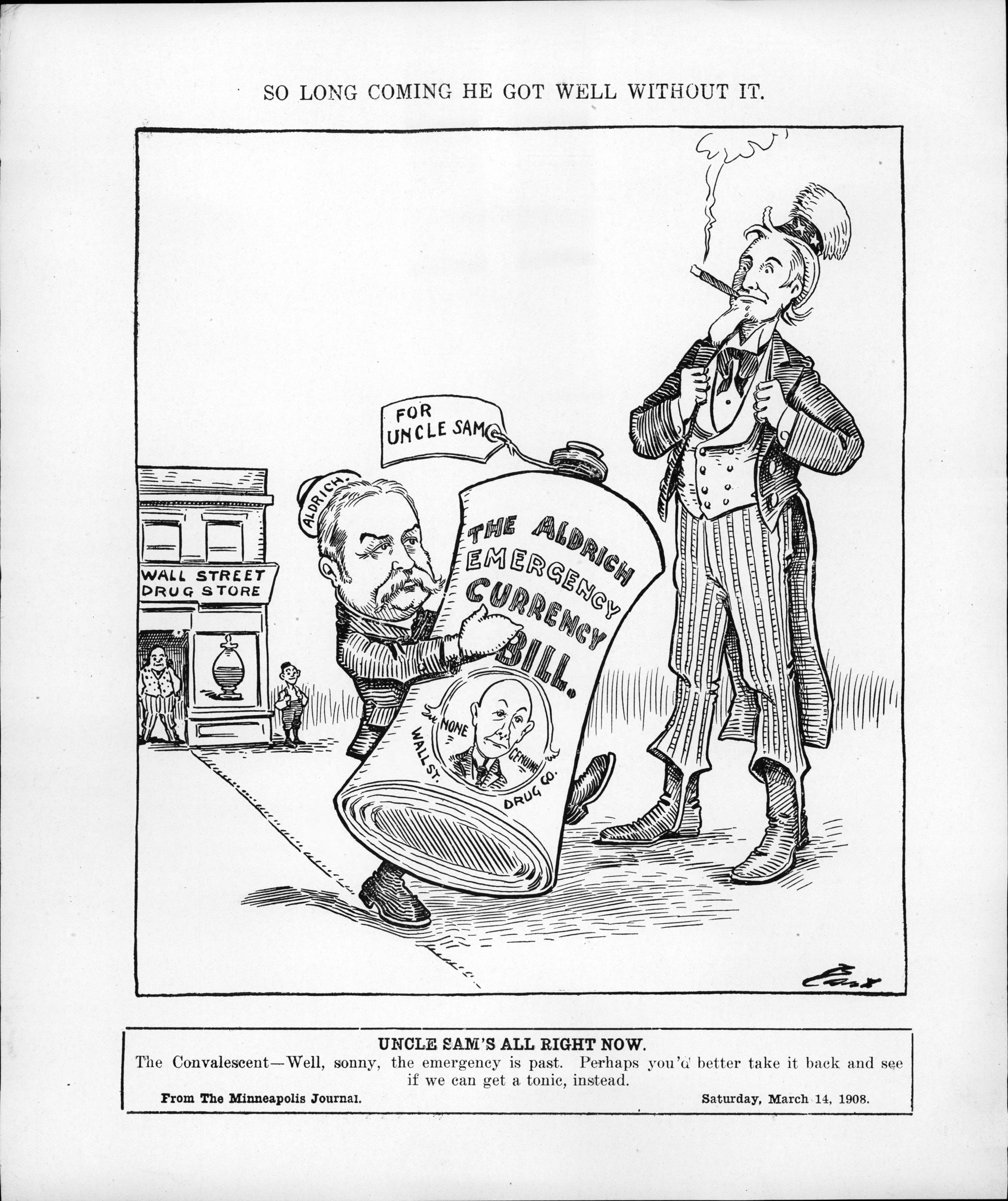
Caricature of Aldrich offering the bill as medicine to Uncle Sam, who has already recovered

The Aldrich–Vreeland Act was a United States law passed in response to the Panic of 1907 which established the National Monetary Commission.

On May 27, 1908, the bill passed the House, mostly on a party-line vote of 166–140, with 13 Republicans voting against it and no Democrats voting for it. On May 30, it passed in the Senate with 43 Republicans for the act and five Republicans joining the 17 Democrats against it. President Roosevelt signed the bill that same night.

The act also allowed national banks to start national currency associations in groups of ten or more, with at least $5 million in total capital, to issue emergency currency. The bank notes were to be backed by not only government bonds but also almost any securities the banks were holding. The act proposed that the emergency currency had to go through a process of approval by the officers of the national currency associations before they were distributed by the Comptroller of the Currency.

However, it is possible that because there was a 5 percent tax placed on this emergency currency for the first month it was "outstanding" and a 1 percent increase for the following months it was "outstanding," no bank notes were issued. Another possible explanation that the emergency currency was never issued was that it was unnecessary.

Congress modified and extended the law in 1914 when British and other foreign creditors demanded immediate payments in gold in amounts that would ordinarily have been carried over and paid through exports of commodities.

Senator Nelson W. Aldrich (R-RI) was largely responsible for the Aldrich-Vreeland Currency Law and became the Chairman of the National Monetary commission. The co-sponsor of the legislation was Representative Edward Vreeland, a Republican from New York.

A usage of the law occurred at the outbreak of World War I in 1914 when the first great financial panic of the 20th century befell the world, necessitating the closure of the New York Stock Exchange. Secretary of the Treasury William Gibbs McAdoo appeared in New York City and assured the public that ample stocks of emergency banknotes had been prepared in accordance with the Aldrich–Vreeland Act and were available for issue to the banks. As of October 23, 1914, $368,616,990 was outstanding.

The Federal Reserve Act of December 23, 1913 took effect in November 1914, when the 12 regional banks opened for business. Ultimately, the emergency currency issued under the Aldrich-Vreeland Act was entirely withdrawn.

Economist J. Laurence Laughlin criticized the legislation, arguing that the authors of the bill have "a lack of expert knowledge in regard to banking."
