= Harold S. Tolley =

American politician (1894–1956)

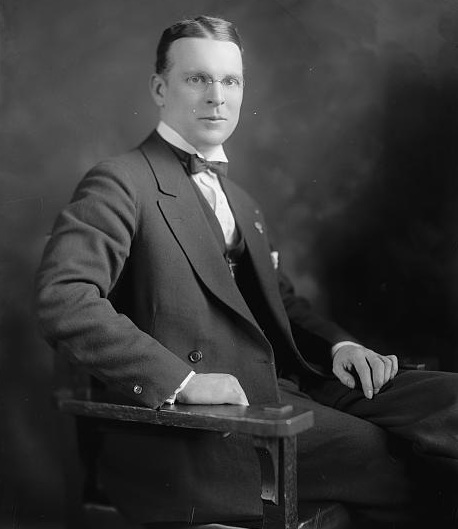

Member of the U.S. House of Representatives from New York's 34th district
- In office March 4, 1925 – March 3, 1927
- Preceded by: John D. Clarke
- Succeeded by: John D. Clarke

Personal details
- Born: January 16, 1894 Honesdale, Pennsylvania
- Died: May 20, 1956 (aged 62) Kenmore, New York
- Party: Republican

Harold Sumner Tolley (January 16, 1894 – May 20, 1956) was a Republican member of the United States House of Representatives from New York.

== Biography ==
Tolley was born in Honesdale, Pennsylvania. He graduated from Syracuse University in 1916. He served in the military during World War I from May 13, 1917, until July 25, 1919, attaining the rank of captain. He was elected to Congress in 1924 and served from March 4, 1925, until March 3, 1927. He was commissioner of public welfare for Binghamton, New York from January 1932 until April 1937. He died in Kenmore, New York.

== Sources ==
- United States Congress. "Harold S. Tolley (id: T000299)". Biographical Directory of the United States Congress.

U.S. House of Representatives
Preceded by John D. Clarke	Member of the U.S. House of Representatives from New York's 34th congressional district 1925–1927	Succeeded by John D. Clarke
