= William G. Laidlaw =

American politician

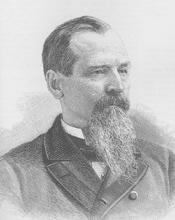

Member of the U.S. House of Representatives from New York's 34th district
- In office March 4, 1887 – March 3, 1891
- Preceded by: Walter L. Sessions
- Succeeded by: Warren B. Hooker

Personal details
- Born: January 1, 1840 Jedburgh, Roxburghshire, Scotland
- Died: August 19, 1908 (aged 68) Ellicottville, New York, U.S.
- Party: Republican

William Grant Laidlaw (January 1, 1840 – August 19, 1908) was a U.S. Representative from New York.

Born near Jedburgh, Roxburghshire, Scotland, Laidlaw immigrated to the United States in 1852 with his parents, who settled in Franklinville, New York.

He attended the common schools and Ten Broeck Free Academy in Franklinville. He studied law, was admitted to the bar in 1866 and practiced.

Laidlaw served two years in the United States Navy during the Civil War.

He was School Commissioner of the Cattaraugus County first district from 1867 to 1870.

He moved to Ellicottville in 1870, where he served as a trustee of the Ellicottville Union School. From 1871 to 1877, he was the federal assessor of internal revenue for New York's thirty-first collection district. He served as district attorney of Cattaraugus County 1877–1883. In 1882 and 1883, he also served as Ellicottville's Town Supervisor and a member of the Cattaraugus County Board of Supervisors.

Laidlaw was elected as a Republican to the Fiftieth and Fifty-first Congresses (March 4, 1887 – March 3, 1891). He served as chairman of the Committee on Claims (Fifty-first Congress).

After leaving Congress, Laidlaw resumed the practicing law in Ellicottville. He died there on August 19, 1908, and was interred in Sunset Hill Cemetery.

== Sources ==
- United States Congress. "William G. Laidlaw (id: L000022)". Biographical Directory of the United States Congress.

U.S. House of Representatives
Preceded by Walter L. Sessions	Member of the U.S. House of Representatives from New York's 34th congressional district 1887–1891	Succeeded by Warren B. Hooker
