= New York's 34th congressional district =

Former congressional district

- Obsolete district
- Created: 1840; 1885
- Eliminated: 1850; 1990
- Years active: 1843–1853; 1885–1993

New York's 34th congressional district was a congressional district for the United States House of Representatives in New York. It was created in 1843 as a result of the 1840 census, eliminated after the 1850 census, and then re-created in 1885 due to the 1880 census. It was eliminated most recently as a result of the 1990 census. It was last represented by Amo Houghton who was redistricted into the 31st district.

== Past components ==
1983–1993:

All of Allegany, Chautauqua, Chemung, Schuyler, Steuben, Yates
Parts of Cattaraugus, Tompkins

1973–1983:

All of Wayne
Parts of Monroe

1971–1973:

All of Cayuga, Ontario, Schuyler, Seneca, Yates
Parts of Livingston, Onondaga, Oswego, Tompkins

1963–1971:

All of Onondaga

1953–1963:

All of Herkimer, Madison, Oneida

1945–1953:

All of Franklin, Herkimer, Jefferson, Lewis, St. Lawrence

1913–1945:

All of Broome, Chenango, Delaware, Otsego

1885–1913:

All of Allegany, Cattaraugus, Chautauqua

== List of members representing the district ==
Member	Party	Years	Cong ress	Electoral history
District established March 4, 1843
Washington Hunt (Lockport)	Whig	March 4, 1843 – March 3, 1849	28th 29th 30th	Elected in 1842. Re-elected in 1844. Re-elected in 1846. Retired.
Lorenzo Burrows (Albion)	Whig	March 4, 1849 – March 3, 1853	31st 32nd	Elected in 1848. Re-elected in 1850. [data missing]
District dissolved March 4, 1853
District re-established March 4, 1885
Walter L. Sessions (Jamestown)	Republican	March 4, 1885 – March 3, 1887	49th	Elected in 1884. Lost re-election.
William G. Laidlaw (Ellicottville)	Republican	March 4, 1887 – March 3, 1891	50th 51st	Elected in 1886. Re-elected in 1888. [data missing]
Warren B. Hooker (Fredonia)	Republican	March 4, 1891 – November 10, 1898	52nd 53rd 54th 55th	Elected in 1890. Re-elected in 1892. Re-elected in 1894. Re-elected in 1896. Re-elected in 1898. Resigned when appointed justice of New York Supreme Court.
Vacant		November 11, 1898 – November 6, 1899	55th 56th	
Edward B. Vreeland (Salamanca)	Republican	November 7, 1899 – March 3, 1903	56th 57th	Elected to finish Hooker's term. Re-elected in 1900. Redistricted to the 37th district.
James Wolcott Wadsworth (Geneseo)	Republican	March 4, 1903 – March 3, 1907	58th 59th	Redistricted from the 30th district and re-elected in 1902. Re-elected in 1904. Lost re-election
Peter A. Porter (Niagara Falls)	Independent Republican	March 4, 1907 – March 3, 1909	60th	Elected in 1906. Retired.
James S. Simmons (Niagara Falls)	Republican	March 4, 1909 – March 3, 1913	61st 62nd	Elected in 1908. Re-elected in 1910. Lost re-election.
George W. Fairchild (Oneonta)	Republican	March 4, 1913 – March 3, 1919	63rd 64th 65th	Redistricted from the 24th district and re-elected in 1912. Re-elected in 1914. Re-elected in 1916. [data missing]
William H. Hill (Johnson City)	Republican	March 4, 1919 – March 3, 1921	66th	Elected in 1918. Retired.
John D. Clarke (Fraser)	Republican	March 4, 1921 – March 3, 1925	67th 68th	Elected in 1920. Re-elected in 1922. Lost re-election.
Harold S. Tolley (Binghamton)	Republican	March 4, 1925 – March 3, 1927	69th	Elected in 1924. Lost renomination
John D. Clarke (Fraser)	Republican	March 4, 1927 – November 5, 1933	70th 71st 72nd 73rd	Elected in 1926. Re-elected in 1928. Re-elected in 1930. Re-elected in 1932. Died.
Vacant		November 6, 1933 – December 27, 1933	73rd	
Marian W. Clarke (Fraser)	Republican	December 28, 1933 – January 3, 1935	73rd	Elected to finish her husband's term. Retired.
Bert Lord (Afton)	Republican	January 3, 1935 – May 24, 1939	74th 75th 76th	Elected in 1934. Re-elected in 1936. Re-elected in 1938. Died.
Vacant		May 25, 1939 – November 6, 1939	76th	
Edwin Arthur Hall (Binghamton)	Republican	November 7, 1939 – January 3, 1945	76th 77th 78th	Elected to finish Lord's term. Re-elected in 1940. Re-elected in 1942. Redistricted to the 37th district.
Clarence E. Kilburn (Malone)	Republican	January 3, 1945 – January 3, 1953	79th 80th 81st 82nd	Redistricted from the 31st district and re-elected in 1944. Re-elected in 1946. Re-elected in 1948. Re-elected in 1950. Redistricted to the 33rd district.
William R. Williams (Cassville)	Republican	January 3, 1953 – January 3, 1959	83rd 84th 85th	Redistricted from the 35th district and re-elected in 1952. Re-elected in 1954. Re-elected in 1956. [data missing]
Alexander Pirnie (Utica)	Republican	January 3, 1959 – January 3, 1963	86th 87th	Elected in 1958. Re-elected in 1960. Redistricted to the 32nd district.
R. Walter Riehlman (Tully)	Republican	January 3, 1963 – January 3, 1965	88th	Redistricted from the 35th district and re-elected in 1962. [data missing]
James M. Hanley (Syracuse)	Democratic	January 3, 1965 – January 3, 1971	89th 90th 91st	Elected in 1964. Re-elected in 1966. Re-elected in 1968. Redistricted to the 35th district.
John H. Terry (Syracuse)	Republican	January 3, 1971 – January 3, 1973	92nd	Elected in 1970. Retired.
Frank Horton (Rochester)	Republican	January 3, 1973 – January 3, 1983	93rd 94th 95th 96th 97th	Redistricted from the 36th district and re-elected in 1972. Re-elected in 1974. Re-elected in 1976. Re-elected in 1978. Re-elected in 1980. Redistricted to the 29th district.
Stan Lundine (Jamestown)	Democratic	January 3, 1983 – December 31, 1986	98th 99th	Redistricted from the 39th district and re-elected in 1982. Re-elected in 1984. Retired to run for Lieutenant Governor of New York and resigned when elected.
Vacant		December 31, 1986 – January 3, 1987	99th	
Amo Houghton (Corning)	Republican	January 3, 1987 – January 3, 1993	100th 101st 102nd	Elected in 1986. Re-elected in 1988. Re-elected in 1990. Redistricted to the 31st district.
District dissolved January 3, 1993

== Recent election results ==
The following chart shows historic election results.

Year	Democratic	Republican	Other
1920	Charles R. Seymour: 21,496	✓ John D. Clarke: 52,809	Arthur Breckenridge (Socialist): 1,386
1922	Clayton L. Wheeler: 23,323	✓ John D. Clarke (Incumbent): 40,902	Arthur Breckenridge (Socialist): 1,018
1924	Charles R. Seymour: 24,800	✓ Harold S. Tolley: 61,547	William M. Boyd (Socialist): 1,979
1926	Bernard J. McGuire: 20,792	✓ John D. Clarke: 52,363	
1928	William W. Lampman: 32,925	✓ John D. Clarke (Incumbent): 80,531	
1930	James F. Byrne: 23,968	✓ John D. Clarke (Incumbent): 51,460	
1932	Charles R. Seymour: 44,174	✓ John D. Clarke (Incumbent): 58,735	Leon Ray Steenburg (Law Preservation): 6,676; Pierre De Nio (Socialist): 718
1934	Charles C. Flaesch: 32,075	✓ Bert Lord: 50,528	Pierre De Nio (Socialist): 1,159; Mathew J. Maxian (Communist): 248
1936	John T. Buckley: 47,857	✓ Bert Lord (Incumbent): 75,580	Merle A. Wilson (Socialist): 1,241
1938	John V. Johnson: 35,456	✓ Bert Lord (Incumbent): 67,330	Merle A. Wilson (Socialist): 305
1940	Donald W. Kramer: 41,027	✓ Edwin A. Hall (Incumbent): 93,990	William Livings (American Labor): 2,563
1942	Arthur J. Ruland: 33,276	✓ Edwin A. Hall (Incumbent): 53,762	Charles F. Doherty (American Labor): 1,444
1944	John D. Van Kennen: 44,557	✓ Clarence E. Kilburn (Incumbent): 75,532	
1946	William G. Houk: 22,368	✓ Clarence E. Kilburn (Incumbent): 64,217	Carl H. Bogardus (American Labor): 1,384
1948	Francis K. Purcell: 43,777	✓ Clarence E. Kilburn (Incumbent): 70,715	Raymond Bull (American Labor): 2,083
1950	Mildred McGill: 32,446	✓ Clarence E. Kilburn (Incumbent): 67,739	Carl H. Bogardus (American Labor): 1,290
1952	Charles Ray Wilson: 65,080	✓ William R. Williams (Incumbent): 97,488	Anthony Blasting (Liberal): 2,797; Michael A. Jimenez (American Labor): 315
1954	Vernon E. Olin: 53,112	✓ William R. Williams (Incumbent): 77,659	Marcia Daz Butler (American Labor): 174
1956	Edwin L. Slusarczyk: 70,837	✓ William R. Williams (Incumbent): 95,681	
1958	Edwin L. Slusarczyk: 68,271	✓ Alexander Pirnie: 70,482	
1960	Edwin L. Slusarczyk: 79,153	✓ Alexander Pirnie (Incumbent): 98,063	
1962	Lee Alexander: 67,149	✓ R. Walter Riehlman (Incumbent): 84,780	John Arneson (Liberal): 2,860
1964	✓ James M. Hanley: 96,219	R. Walter Riehlman (Incumbent): 91,697	
1966	✓ James M. Hanley (Incumbent): 90,044	Stewart F. Hancock Jr.: 62,559	Benjamin K. Souler (Conservative): 5,903; Norman Balabanian (Liberal): 4,900
1968	✓ James M. Hanley (Incumbent): 96,520	David V. O'Brien: 82,333	Francis H. Aspinwall (Conservative): 6,988; Aubrey D. Tussing (Liberal): 2,282
1970	Neal P. McCurn: 60,452	✓ John H. Terry: 88,786	
1972	Jack Rubens: 46,509	✓ Frank Horton (Incumbent): 142,803	Richard E. Lusink (Conservative): 5,603; Rafael Martinez (Liberal): 3,088
1974	Irene Gossin: 45,408	✓ Frank Horton (Incumbent): 105,585	J. Warren McGee (Conservative): 4,309; Virginia Tadio (Liberal): 1,063
1976	William C. Larsen: 58,247	✓ Frank Horton (Incumbent): 126,566	Thomas D. Cook (Conservative): 7,383
1978	✓ Frank Horton (Incumbent): 60,704	✓ Frank Horton (Incumbent): 62,081	Leo J. Kesselring (Conservative): 18,127
1980	James Toole: 37,883	✓ Frank Horton (Incumbent): 133,278	Clyde O. Benoy (Conservative): 5,829; William Bastuk (Right to Life): 3,178; David D. Hoesly (Libertarian): 2,627
1982	✓ Stan Lundine (Incumbent): 99,502	James J. Snyder Sr.: 63,972	Genevieve F. Ronan (Right to Life): 1,806
1984	✓ Stan Lundine (Incumbent): 110,902	Jill Houghton Emery: 91,016	Carol L. Fisher (Right to Life): 2,560
1986	Larry M. Himelein: 56,898	✓ Amo Houghton: 85,856	
1988		✓ Amo Houghton (Incumbent): 131,078	Ian Kelly Woodward (Liberal): 4,797
1990	Joseph P. Leahey: 37,421	✓ Amo Houghton (Incumbent): 89,831	Nevin K. Eklund (Liberal): 1,807
