= Federal Reserve Act =

1913 United States law creating the Federal Reserve System

- Long title: An Act to provide for the establishment of Federal reserve banks, to furnish an elastic currency, to afford means of rediscounting commercial paper, to establish a more effective supervision of banking in the United States, and for other purposes
- Enacted by: the 63rd United States Congress

Citations
- Public law: Pub. L. 63–43
- Statutes at Large: ch. 6, 38 Stat. 251

Legislative history
- Introduced in the House as H.R. 7837 by Carter Glass (D-VA) on August 29, 1913; Committee consideration by House Banking, Senate Banking; Passed the House on September 18, 1913 (287–85, 5 Present); Passed the Senate on December 18, 1913 (54–34); Reported by the joint conference committee on December 22, 1913; agreed to by the House on December 22, 1913 (298–60) and by the Senate on December 23, 1913 (43–25); Signed into law by President Woodrow Wilson on December 23, 1913

Major amendments
- 1933 Banking Act; Banking Act of 1935; Dodd–Frank Wall Street Reform and Consumer Protection Act; Economic Growth, Regulatory Relief, and Consumer Protection Act

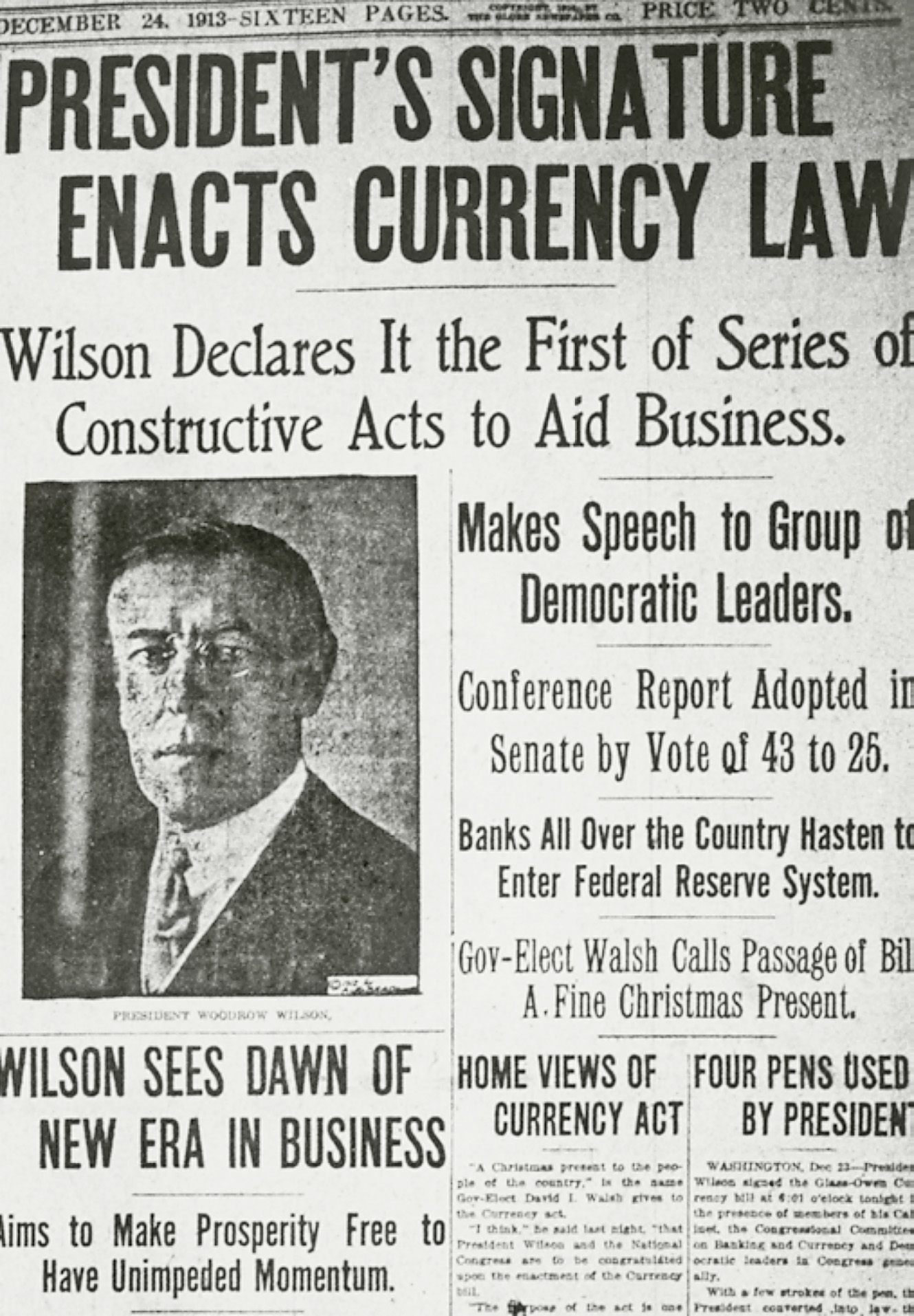
Federal Reserve

The Federal Reserve Act was passed by the 63rd United States Congress and signed into law by President Woodrow Wilson on December 23, 1913. The law created the Federal Reserve System, the central banking system of the United States.

Following the 1912 elections, in which Democrats gained control of Congress and the presidency, President Wilson, Congressman Carter Glass, and Senator Robert Latham Owen introduced legislation to create a central bank. The proposal was shaped by debate between those who favored private control of a central bank, such as proponents of the earlier Aldrich Plan, and those who favored government control, including progressives like William Jennings Bryan. Wilson prioritized the bill as part of his New Freedom domestic agenda, and it passed Congress largely as introduced.

The Federal Reserve Act created the Federal Reserve System, consisting of twelve regional Federal Reserve Banks jointly responsible for managing the money supply, making loans and providing oversight to banks, and serving as a lender of last resort. It also established the Federal Reserve Board of Governors, members of which are appointed by the president. The 1933 Banking Act amended the Federal Reserve Act to create the Federal Open Market Committee, which oversees the Federal Reserve's open market operations. A later amendment required the Federal Reserve to aim for maximum employment, stable prices, and moderate long-term interest rates.

== Overview ==
The Federal Reserve Act created a system of private and public entities. There were to be at least eight and no more than twelve private regional Federal Reserve banks. Twelve were established, and each had various branches, a board of directors, and district boundaries. The Federal Reserve Board, consisting of seven members, was created as the governing body of the Fed. Each member is appointed by the U.S. president and confirmed by the U.S. Senate. In 1935, the Board was renamed and restructured. Also created as part of the Federal Reserve System was a 12-member Federal Advisory Committee and a single new United States currency, the Federal Reserve Note. The Federal Reserve Act created a national currency and a monetary system that could respond effectively to the stresses in the banking system and create a stable financial system. The goal of the system was to ensure that there would always be a supply of money and credit in times of financial strain. With the goal of creating a national monetary system and financial stability, the Federal Reserve Act also provided many other functions and financial services for the economy, such as check clearing and collection for all members of the Federal Reserve.

With the passing of the Federal Reserve Act, Congress required that all nationally chartered banks become members of the Federal Reserve System. These banks were required to purchase specified non-transferable stock in their regional Federal Reserve banks, and to set aside a stipulated amount of non-interest bearing reserves with their respective reserve banks. Since 1980, all depository institutions have been required to set aside reserves with the Federal Reserve. Such institutions are entitled to certain Federal Reserve services. State chartered banks were given the option of becoming members of the Federal Reserve System and in the case of the exercise of such option were to be subject to supervision, in part, by the Federal Reserve System. Member banks became entitled to have access to discounted loans at the discount window in their respective reserve banks, to a 6% annual dividend in their Federal Reserve stock, and to other services.

== Background ==
Central banking has made various institutional appearances throughout the history of the United States. These institutions started with the First and Second banks of the United States, which were championed in large part by Alexander Hamilton.

=== First Bank of United States ===
The American financial system was deeply fragmented after the American Revolutionary War. The government was burdened with large wartime debts, and the new republic needed a strong financial institution to give the country a resilient financial footing. Alexander Hamilton and Thomas Jefferson had opposing views regarding whether the US could benefit from a European-style national financial institution. Hamilton was in favor of building a strong centralized political and economic institution to solve the country's financial problem. He argued that a central bank could bring order to the US monetary system, manage the government's revenues and payments, and provide credit to both the public and private sectors. On the other hand, Jefferson was deeply suspicious of a central bank because, he argued, it would undermine democracy. Jefferson and Southern members of congress also believed that a strong central financial institution would serve commercial interests of the north at the expense of Southern-based agriculture interests whose credit was provided by local banks during the post-revolutionary war era. The First Bank of the United States was established in 1791 chartered for a period of twenty years. The US government was the largest shareholder of the bank. Despite its shareholder status, the government was not permitted to participate in management of the bank. The bank accepted deposits, issued bank notes, and provided short-term loans to the government. It also functioned as a clearinghouse for government debt. The bank could also regulate state-chartered banks to prevent overproduction of banknotes. While some credited the bank with helping stabilize government finances and influence the broader economy, it remained a source of controversy. Many Jeffersonians argued that the bank was unconstitutional and concentrated too much financial power in a centralized institution. In 1811, the first bank of the United States failed to be renewed by one vote in both the House and the Senate.

=== Second Bank of the United States ===
After the War of 1812, economic instability necessitated the creation of a second national bank. Due to expanding money supply and lack of supervision, individual bank activity sparked high inflation. In 1816, a second national bank was created with a charter of twenty years. Three years later, during the panic of 1819 the second bank of the United States was blamed for overextending credit in a land boom, and would tighten up credit policies following the panic. The Second bank was unpopular among the western and southern state-chartered banks, and constitutionality of a national bank was questioned. President Jackson would come into office, and wished to end the current central bank during his presidency. Under the premise that the bank favored a small economic and political elite at the expense of the public majority, the Second Bank became private after its charter expired in 1836, and would undergo liquidation in 1841.

For nearly 80 years, the U.S. was without a central bank after the charter for the Second Bank of the United States was allowed to expire. After various financial panics, particularly a severe one in 1907, some Americans became persuaded that the country needed some sort of banking and currency reform that would, when threatened by financial panics, provide a ready reserve of liquid assets, and furthermore allow for currency and credit to expand and contract seasonally within the U.S. economy.

Some of this was chronicled in the reports of the National Monetary Commission (1909–1912), which was created by the Aldrich–Vreeland Act in 1908. Included in a report of the Commission, submitted to Congress on January 9, 1912, were recommendations and draft legislation with 59 sections, for proposed changes in U.S. banking and currency laws. The proposed legislation was known as the Aldrich Plan, named after the chairman of the Commission, Republican Senator Nelson W. Aldrich of Rhode Island.

The Plan called for the establishment of a National Reserve Association with 15 regional district branches and 46 geographically dispersed directors primarily from the banking profession. The Reserve Association would make emergency loans to member banks, print money, and act as the fiscal agent for the U.S. government. State and nationally chartered banks would have the option of subscribing to specified stock in their local association branch. It is generally believed that the outline of the Plan had been formulated in a secret meeting on Jekyll Island in November 1910, which Aldrich and other well connected financiers attended.

Since the Aldrich Plan gave too little power to the government, there was strong opposition to it from rural and western states because of fears that it would become a tool of bankers, specifically the Money Trust of New York City. Indeed, from May 1912 through January 1913 the Pujo Committee, a subcommittee of the House Committee on Banking and Currency, held investigative hearings on the alleged Money Trust and its interlocking directorates. These hearings were chaired by Rep. Arsene Pujo, a Democratic representative from Louisiana.

In the election of 1912, the Democratic Party won control of the White House and both chambers of Congress. The party's platform stated strong opposition to the Aldrich Plan. The platform also called for a systematic revision of banking laws in ways that would provide relief from financial panics, unemployment and business depression, and would protect the public from the "domination by what is known as the Money Trust." The final plan, however, was quite similar to the Aldrich Plan, with a few revisions. Sen. Carter Glass made these revisions, although the main premise of the Aldrich Plan was in there. Changes in the Banking and Currency System of the United States, House Report No. 69, 63rd Congress to accompany H.R. 7837, from the House Committee on Banking and Currency, was submitted to the full House by Carter Glass, on September 9, 1913. A discussion of the deficiencies of the then current banking system as well as those in the Aldrich Plan and quotations from the 1912 Democratic platform are laid out in this report, pages 3–11.

== Legislative history ==
Attempts to reform currency and banking had been made in the United States before the introduction of H.R. 7837. The first major form of this type of legislation came through with the First Bank of the United States in 1791. Championed by Alexander Hamilton, this established a central bank that included in a three-part expansion of federal fiscal and monetary power (including federal mint and excise taxes). Attempts were made to extend this bank's charter, but they would fail before the charters expiration in 1811. Paper money funding of the War of 1812 led to inflation. Banks were allowed to waive redemption in specie while forcing their debtors to repay as usual. In 1816, the U.S. Congress chartered the Second Bank, which pursued contraction policies. The charter for the Second Bank would expire in 1836, leaving the U.S. without a central bank for nearly eighty years.

In the aftermath of the Panic of 1907, there was general agreement among leaders in both parties of the necessity to create some sort of central banking system to provide coordination during financial emergencies. Most leaders also sought currency reform, as they believed that the roughly $3.8 billion in coins and banknotes did not provide an adequate money supply during financial panics. Under conservative Republican Senator Nelson Aldrich's leadership, the National Monetary Commission had put forward a plan to establish a central banking system that would issue currency and provide oversight and loans to the nation's banks. However, many progressives distrusted the plan due to the degree of influence bankers would have over the central banking system. Relying heavily on the advice of Louis Brandeis, Wilson sought a middle ground between progressives such as William Jennings Bryan and conservative Republicans like Aldrich. He declared that the banking system must be "public not private, [and] must be vested in the government itself so that the banks must be the instruments, not the masters, of business."

Democratic Congressman Carter Glass and Senator Robert L. Owen crafted a compromise plan in which private banks would control twelve regional Federal Reserve Banks, but a controlling interest in the system was placed in a central board filled with presidential appointees. The system of twelve regional banks was designed with the goal of diminishing Wall Street's influence. Wilson convinced Bryan's supporters that the plan met their demands for an elastic currency because Federal Reserve notes would be obligations of the government. The bill passed the House in September 1913, but it faced stronger opposition in the Senate. After Wilson convinced just enough Democrats to defeat an amendment put forth by bank president Frank A. Vanderlip that would have given private banks greater control over the central banking system, the Senate voted 54–34 to approve the Federal Reserve Act. Wilson signed the bill into law in December 1913.

== Amendments ==
The Federal Reserve Act was amended in major ways over time, e.g. to account for Hawaii and Alaska's admission to the Union, for restructuring of the Fed's districts, and to specify jurisdictions.

=== Monetary expansion in World War I ===
In June 1917 Congress passed major amendments to the Act to enable monetary expansion to cover the expected costs of World War I, which the US had just entered in April. The amendments allowed a more flexible definition of the gold backing the dollar currency in circulation. This relaxation de facto allowed less gold backing for each dollar note, and enabled the currency in circulation to more than double from $465m to $1247m just from June to December 1917. This reform has been argued to have been necessary to finance the expected $2 billion dollar cost of participating in the war for a year. Price inflation followed.

=== Charter extension ===
The Federal Reserve Act originally granted a twenty-year charter to the Federal Reserve Banks: "To have succession for a period of twenty years from its organization unless it is sooner dissolved by an Act of Congress, or unless its franchise becomes forfeited by some violation of law." This clause was amended on February 25, 1927: "To have succession after the approval of this Act until dissolved by Act of Congress or until forfeiture of franchise for violation of law." The success of this amendment is notable, as in 1933, the US was in the throes of the Great Depression and public sentiment with regards to the Federal Reserve System and the banking community in general had significantly deteriorated. Given the political climate, including of Franklin D. Roosevelt's administration and New Deal legislation, it is uncertain whether the Federal Reserve System would have survived.

=== Federal Open Market Committee ===
In 1933, by way of the Banking Act of 1933, the Federal Reserve Act was amended to create the Federal Open Market Committee (FOMC), which consists of the seven members of the Board of Governors of the Federal Reserve System and five representatives from the Federal Reserve Banks. The FOMC is required to meet at least four times a year (in practice, the FOMC usually meets eight times) and has the power to direct all open-market operations of the Federal Reserve banks.

=== 12 USC § 225a ===
On November 16, 1977, the Federal Reserve Act was amended to require the Board and the FOMC "to promote effectively the goals of maximum employment, stable prices, and moderate long-term interest rates." The Chairman was also required to appear before Congress at semi-annual hearings to report on the conduct of monetary policy, on economic development, and on the prospects for the future. The Federal Reserve Act has been amended by some 200 subsequent laws of Congress. It continues to be one of the principal banking laws of the United States.

== Impact ==
The passing of the Federal Reserve act of 1913 carried implications both domestically and internationally for the United States economic system. The absence of a central banking structure in the U.S. previous to this act left a financial essence that was characterized by immobile reserves and inelastic currency. Creating the Federal Reserve gave the Federal Reserve control to regulate inflation, even though the government control over such powers would eventually lead to decisions that were controversial. Some of the most prominent implications include the internationalization of the U.S. Dollar as a global currency, the impact from the perception of the Central Bank structure as a public good by creating a system of financial stability (Parthemos 19-28), and the Impact of the Federal Reserve in response to economic panics. The Federal Reserve Act also permitted national banks to make mortgage loans for farm land, which had not been permitted previously.

== Criticisms ==
Throughout the history of the United States, there has been an enduring economic and political debate regarding the costs and benefits of central banking. Since the inception of a central bank in the United States, there were multiple opposing views to this type of economic system. Opposition was based on protectionist sentiment; a central bank would serve a handful of financiers at the expense of small producers, businesses, farmers and consumers, and could destabilize the economy through speculation and inflation. This created even further controversy over who would select the decision-makers in charge of the Federal Reserve. Proponents argued that a strong banking system could provide enough credit for a growing economy and avoid economic depressions. Other critical views included the belief that the bill gave too much power to the federal government after the senate revised the bill to create 12 board members who were each appointed by the president.

Preceding the creation of the Federal Reserve, no U.S. central banking systems lasted for more than 25 years. Some of the questions raised include: whether Congress has the Constitutional power to delegate its power to coin money (Article 1, Sec. 8, Clause 5, states: "The Congress shall have power To coin Money, regulate the Value thereof, and of foreign Coin, and fix the Standard of Weights and Measures"), whether the structure of the Federal Reserve is transparent enough, whether the Federal Reserve is a public cartel of private banks (also called a private banking cartel) established to protect powerful financial interests, fears of inflation, high government deficits, and whether the Federal Reserve's actions increased the severity of the Great Depression in the 1930s (and/or the severity or frequency of other boom-bust economic cycles, such as the late 2000s recession).
