= National Monetary Commission =

1908 U.S. congressional commission to determine how to reform the U.S. financial system

The National Monetary Commission was a U.S. congressional commission created by the Aldrich–Vreeland Act of 1908. After the Panic of 1907, the Commission studied the banking laws of the United States, and the leading countries of Europe. The chairman of the commission, Senator Nelson Aldrich, a Republican leader in the Senate, personally led a team of experts to major European capitals. They were stunned to discover how much more efficient the European financial system appeared to be and how much more important than the dollar were the pound, the franc and the mark in international trade. The commission's reports and recommendations became one of the principal bases in the enactment of the Federal Reserve Act of 1913 which created the modern Federal Reserve system.

== Background ==
Following the panics of the late 1890s and early 1900s, the American people were aroused to the need for basic reforms. One of the most painful aspects of the economic crisis before World War I was the rush by individuals and businesses, as they became apprehensive about the economic future, to the banks to convert their deposits into cash. A common way to mitigate these "bank runs" was to suspend cash payments during crises, either by imposing a maximum daily withdrawal or complete suspension.

In the Southeast and Midwest, the resulting shortage of cash was so serious that local clearinghouses issued emergency notes against collateral pledged by cooperating banks so that people could carry on business. Suspending cash payments and issuing clearinghouse certificates were better than allowing a panic to continue, but the public wanted a reform that would prevent suspensions altogether.

== Functions ==
The plan proposed by the Monetary Commission provided for the establishment of local associations of banks and the grouping of these into regional associations. These were further grouped into a national reserve association with a head office at Washington. Under certain conditions, all banks in the country were to be eligible for membership in this central institution. Its functions were to be essentially the same as those performed by the great central banks of Europe, namely, the holding and administration of the bank reserves of the country, the issue of an elastic currency based upon commercial assets, the rediscount of commercial paper for banking institutions, and serving as a depositary and disbursing agent for the Government. The commission believed that it had worked out a system of control which would prevent the domination of the association by any group of interests, political or financial.

== Reports ==
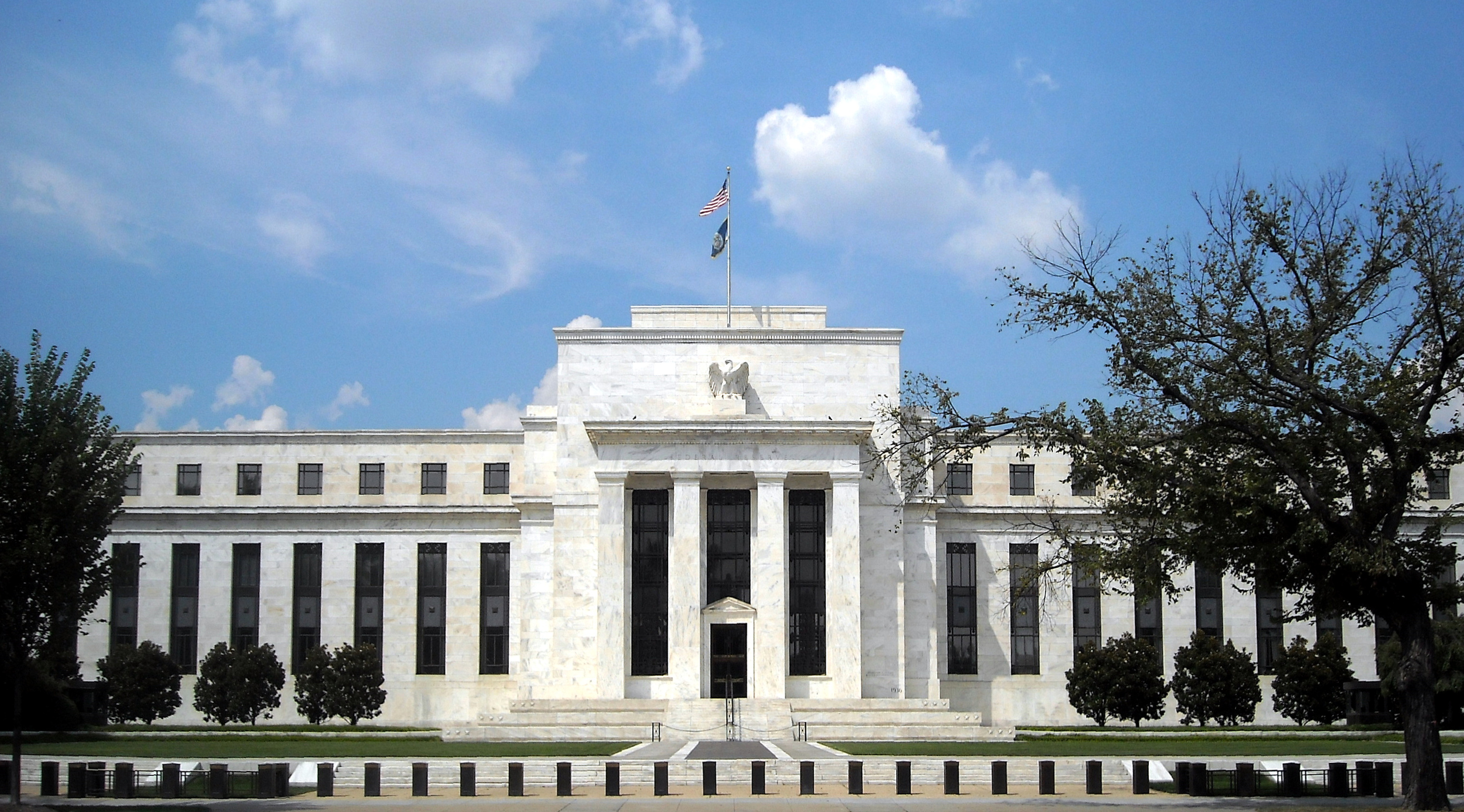
The Eccles Building in Washington, D.C., which serves as the Federal Reserve System's headquarters.

The Commission issued 30 reports (1909-1912) that provided a detailed and authoritative survey of banking systems of the late 19th and early 20th centuries. The reports examine such topics as U.S. financial laws; U.S. state banking statutes; Canadian banking history; and the banking and currency systems of England, France, Germany and other nations.

The volumes contain essays commissioned from leading specialists, plus numerous tables, charts, graphs, and facsimiles of forms and documents. Some volumes contain transcripts of relevant speeches, interviews, and hearings. Mitchell provides a comprehensive review of the documents prepared by the commission. The reports were published by the U.S. Government Printing Office between 1909 and 1912 with the final report containing proposed recommendations and draft legislation to establish a national reserve association in the United States.

== Effects ==
The plan submitted by the commission was intended to be nonpartisan, and the report was unanimous and signed by Republican and Democratic members alike. It failed to get strong public support partly because of its apparent resemblance to a central bank and of popular suspicion of its main author, Senator Nelson Aldrich.

The appearance of the Monetary Commission's report stimulated widespread interest and discussion of banking reform. In the presidential campaign of 1912 two of the political parties in their national platforms condemned the plan proposed by the National Monetary Commission, and the successful Democratic Party, led by Woodrow Wilson, specifically opposed any plan involving a central bank. Many of the features of that plan, however, were incorporated in the banking bill, known as the Federal Reserve Act. The bill, which created the central banking system of the U.S. and granted it the legal authority to issue legal tender, was introduced in Congress on June 26, and finally enacted into law, December 23, 1913.
