= 1922 New York state election =

1922 New York gubernatorial election
- November 7, 1922
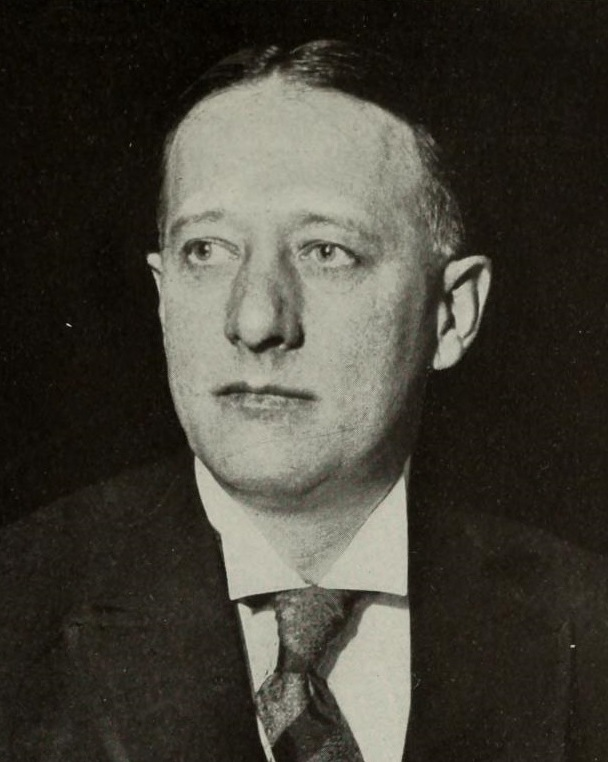

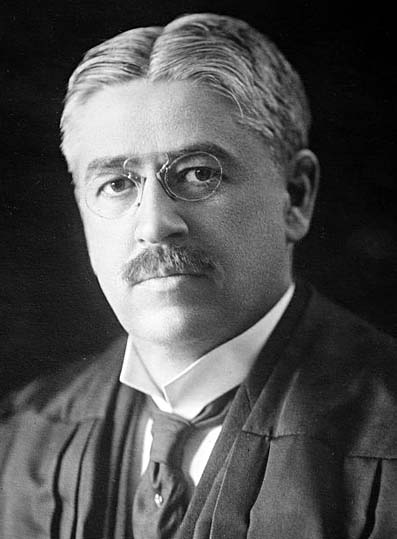
Nominee	Al Smith	Nathan L. Miller
Party	Democratic	Republican
Popular vote	1,397,670	1,011,725
Percentage	55.22%	39.98%
- County results Smith: 40–50% 50–60% 60–70% 70–80% Miller: 40–50% 50–60% 60–70% 70–80%
Governor before election
Nathan L. Miller
Republican
Elected Governor
Al Smith
Democratic

The 1922 New York state election was held on November 7, 1922, to elect the governor, the lieutenant governor, the Secretary of State, the state comptroller, the attorney general, the state treasurer, the state engineer and a U.S. senator, as well as all members of the New York State Assembly and the New York State Senate. Two amendments to the State Constitution were also proposed. During his 1922 reelection bid, Smith notably embraced his position as an opponent of Prohibition.

== History ==
A Socialist state convention met on July 2 at 5, East Sixteenth Street in New York City. They nominated a tentative ticket which would be the basis for a fusion with the Farmer-Labor Party to be effected later. On it were ex-alderman Edward F. Cassidy for governor; Theresa B. Wiley, of Schenectady, for lieutenant governor; A. Philip Randolph for secretary of state; James C. Sheahan, a railroad worker of Albany, for comptroller; Morris Berman for treasurer; Hezekiah D. Wilcox for attorney general; Charles P. Steinmetz for state engineer; and John W. Dannes, of Rochester, for U.S. Senate. The official state convention met on September 30 at 7 East Fifteenth Street in New York City; S. John Block was chairman. They nominated the same state ticket which was already proposed in July, with one exception. For U.S. Senate, Mrs. Esther Lefkowitz, of Elmhurst was nominated.

The Republican state convention met on September 28 in Albany, New York. Elihu Root was temporary chairman until the choice of Speaker H. Edmund Machold as permanent chairman. All nominations, except for secretary of state, were unopposed. Governor Nathan L. Miller was re-nominated. William J. Donovan was nominated for lieutenant governor. Secretary of State John J. Lyons was defeated on the first ballot by Samuel J. Joseph, of The Bronx (vote: Joseph 1031, Lyons 158). The incumbents Comptroller William J. Maier, Treasurer N. Monroe Marshall and U.S. Senator William M. Calder were re-nominated. Superintendent of Public Works Charles L. Cadle, of Rochester, was nominated for state engineer; and Erskine C. Rogers, of Hudson Falls, for attorney general.

The Democratic state convention met on September 29 in Syracuse, New York. Mayor of Albany William S. Hackett was permanent chairman. Ex-Governor Al Smith (in office 1919–20) was nominated again for governor, all 734 votes were cast for him, the only candidate. Mayor of Schenectady George R. Lunn was nominated for lieutenant governor; New York City Commissioner of Corrections James A. Hamilton for secretary of state; Ex-Mayor of Troy James W. Fleming for comptroller, Captain George K. Shuler for treasurer; Assistant U.S. Attorney for the Western District of New York Carl Sherman for attorney general; Dwight B. LaDu for state engineer; and New York City Health Commissioner Dr. Royal S. Copeland for U.S. Senator. All nominations were unopposed.

== Result ==
The whole Democratic ticket was elected.

The incumbents Miller, Maier, Marshall and Calder were defeated.

The Democratic, Republican and Socialist parties maintained automatic ballot access (necessary 15,000 votes for governor), the Farmer-Labor and Prohibition parties lost it; and the Socialist Labor Party did not re-attain it.

1922 state election results
Office	Democratic ticket		Republican ticket		Socialist/Farmer-Labor ticket		Prohibition ticket		Socialist Labor ticket	
Governor	Alfred E. Smith	1,397,670	Nathan L. Miller	1,011,725	Edward F. Cassidy	108,136 (Note: Cassidy polled 99,944 votes on the Socialist ticket; 6,887 votes on the Farmer-Labor ticket; and 1,805 votes "on Socialist and Farmer-Labor emblems")	George K. Hinds	9,561	Jeremiah D. Crowley (Note: Jeremiah D. Crowley, of Marcellus, ran also for state engineer in 1910; for lieutenant governor in 1912, 1914 and 1920; and for governor in 1916)	3,799
Lieutenant Governor	George R. Lunn	1,244,036	William J. Donovan	1,070,075	Theresa B. Wiley	117,269	William C. Ramsdell	20,195	John E. DeLee (Note: John E. DeLee, ran also for comptroller in 1920)	5,539
Secretary of State	James A. Hamilton	1,205,736	Samuel J. Joseph	1,062,921	A. Philip Randolph	129,461	Helen G. H. Estelle	24,776	May Phalor (Note: May Phalor, ran also in 1920)	5,625
Comptroller	James W. Fleming	1,191,894	William J. Maier	1,066,871	James C. Sheahan	132,739	Edwin S. Dean	21,611	John Donahue (Note: John Donahue, ran also for attorney general in 1918 and 1920)	7,078
Attorney General	Carl Sherman	1,192,468	Erskine C. Rogers	1,064,223	Hezekiah D. Wilcox (Note: Hezekiah D. Wilcox, of Elmira, ran also for the Court of Appeals in 1916, 1917 and 1921; and for attorney general in 1918)	130,286	Francis E. Baldwin (Note: Francis E. Baldwin, ran also for governor in 1894; for chief judge in 1897; for attorney general in 1910; for U.S. Senator in 1914; and for the Court of Appeals in 1920)	23,015	Erwin A. Archer (Note: Erwin A. Archer, ran also for U.S. Senator in 1914; and for attorney general in 1916)	5,963
Treasurer	George K. Shuler	1,174,218	N. Monroe Marshall	1,084,405	Morris Berman (Note: Morris Berman, retired merchant of Cedarhurst, ran also for state engineer in 1895)	132,726	Albert W. Pierson (Note: Albert W. Pierson, of Niagara Falls, ran also for state engineer in 1898, 1908 and 1910)	21,256	Charles W. Ensign	5,959
State Engineer	Dwight B. LaDu	1,037,314	Charles L. Cadle	1,009,582	Charles P. Steinmetz	291,763	John G. Passage	19,852	Simeon Bickwheat	5,131
U.S. Senator	Royal S. Copeland	1,276,667	William M. Calder	995,421	Algernon Lee	117,928	Coleridge A. Hart (Note: Coleridge Allen Hart (b. July 11, 1852 Peekskill), lawyer, of Brooklyn, ran also for attorney general in 1889; and for the Court of Appeals in 1907, 1908, 1914, 1916, 1917 and 1920)	32,124	Henry Kuhn (Note: Henry Kuhn, ran also for secretary of state in 1910; and for attorney general in 1912)	4,993

== Amendments ==
- The amendment proposing to increase the salaries of the judges of the New York Court of Appeals from $10,000 to $17,000 was rejected: 572,502 For and 891,980 Against.
- The amendment proposing a change in the procedure relating to special city bills was accepted: 819,628 For and 554,654 Against.

== See also ==
- New York gubernatorial elections
- New York state elections

== Sources ==
- The tickets: "Aspirants Seeking Office Next Tuesday". The New York Times. November 5, 1922.
- Result: "Smith Plurality Fixed at 385,945". The New York Times. December 8, 1922.
- Result (Prohibition only): Vote for Prohibition candidates at Prohibitionists.org
- Results, New York Red Book 1923
