= Meier Steinbrink =

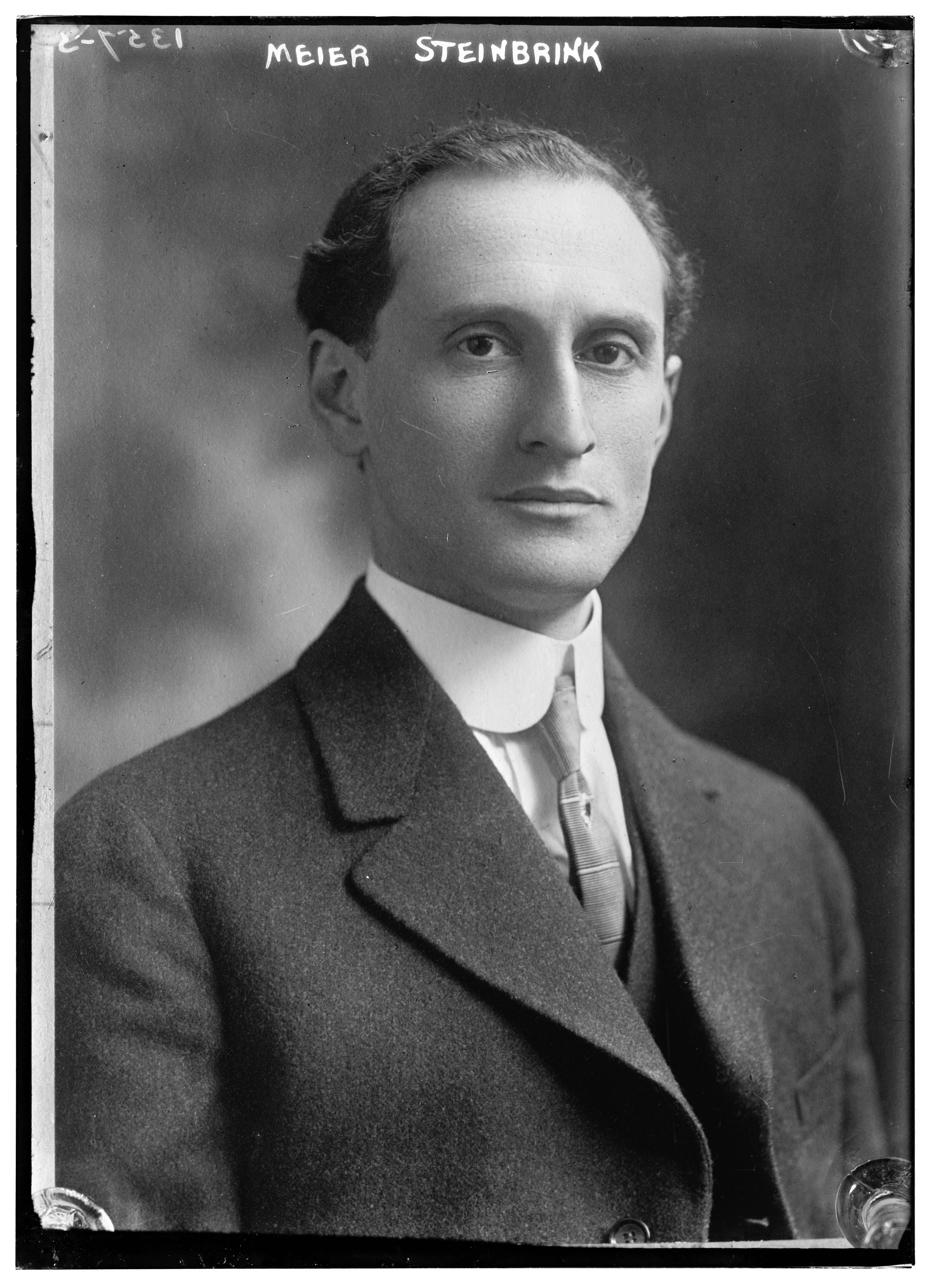
Steinbrink c. 1900

Meier Steinbrink (February 28, 1880 – December 7, 1967) was a Jewish-American lawyer and judge from New York.

== Life ==
Steinbrink was born on February 28, 1880, in New York City, New York, the son of Samuel Steinbrink and Fredericka Stein (originally Wittgenstein). His father ran a small candy store.

Steinbrink attended the Public School No. 1 of Brooklyn, the Boys High School of Brooklyn, and the New York University School of Law. He was admitted to the bar in 1901 and began practicing law in Brooklyn. In 1911, the Brooklyn Standard Union picked him to expose and prosecute the WIllet judiciary scandal. In 1915, he was counsel for the Roman Catholic Church in wire-tapping cases. In 1917, he became a member of the District Board of Appeals in draft cases for New York City. He was associated with Charles Evans Hughes in the Aircraft investigations in 1918, and his work in those investigations led to his work with a House of Representatives select committee in 1919 to investigate expenditures of the War Department. In 1922, he was a special assistant to the United States Attorney General in the trial of Civl War fraud cases which grew out of aircraft production. He was an advisory committee member of the Hamilton branch of the Chase National Bank, a director of the Greater New York Savings Bank and the National Title Company, and second vice-president and director of the Brooklyn National Life Insurance Company.

Steinbrink was special counsel for New York City in an investigation of city contracts in 1921. He was an arbitrator for the Arbitration Society of America. In the 1912 New York state election, he was the Republican candidate for Attorney General of New York. He was 32 in that election, making him the youngest person to have been nominated for the office at the time. He lost the election to Democratic candidate Thomas Carmody. He was a delegate to the 1915 New York State Constitutional Convention. By 1915, he was a member of the law firm Jones, McKinney & Steinbrink. He was a presidential elector in the 1928 presidential election.

From 1928 to 1929, Steinbrink served in the ambulance chasing investigation in the Second Judicial District without compensation. In 1932, he became a Justice of the New York Supreme Court. In 1939, he became a member of the Appellate Term. Early in his judgeship, while treating an airplane collision, he demonstrated the elasticity of the law which permitted applying its rules to novel situations. He later authorized a blood test to be used to demonstrate paternity, which established a precedent that later resulted in specific legislation. In 1933, during the Great Depression, he determined the applicable law came to aid of home owners by permitting them to retain possession during the pendency of foreclosure action. He also declared an ordinance that prohibited peddling on the streets of New York City unconstitutional.

As Justice, Steinbrink played a major role in establishing a Committee for the Protection of Religious Freedom Through the World in 1949. In that year, he also presided over the case of Rev. John Howard Melish, the rector of the Holy Trinity Episcopal Church who was ordered to relinquish the rectorship by Bishop James Pernette De Wolfe for his avowed approval of his son and assistant Rev. William Howard Melish's 'radical' activities. Steinbrink ruled for removal, and the Appellate Division upheld the decision. He retired as Justice in 1957. He was chairman of the Anti-Defamation League from 1946 to 1952, and was a vigorous opponent of racial injustice and fought for the rights of all minority groups. He frequently called for a federal civil rights law and spoke out for fair employment practices.

Steinbrink received the Gold Key Award from the Jewish Culture Foundation of New York University in 1941, a scroll from the Interfaith Movement in 1944, a citation from B'nai B'rith in 1947, a citation from the JDA in 1950, the Felix M. Warburg Memorial award from the Federation of Jewish Philanthropies in 1950, the NCCJ award from the Brooklyn division in 1955, and the Man of the Year plaque from the Metropolitan Conference of Temple Brotherhoods in 1958. He was president of the New York Federation of Reform Synagogues from 1942 to 1946 and its honorary president from 1946 to 1950. He was a trustee of the Federation of Jewish Philanthropies and an honorary chairman of its Brooklyn division. He became a director of the Sigmund Livingston Memorial Scholarship Fund, the Brooklyn chapter of the American Cancer Committee, and the Leo N. Levi Memorial Hospital in 1950.

Steinbrink received an honorary LL.D. degree from Brooklyn Law School in 1934. He was active in Jewish communal work in Brooklyn, serving as the first president of the United Jewish Aid Society and as an incorporator and director of the Brooklyn Federation of Jewish Charities. In 1938, when a group of Brooklyn Jews founded an organization to propagandize for the proportional representation of Jews in government, he came out firmly against all segregative political steps. In 1943, he was president of the 38th biennial convention of the Union of American Hebrew Congregations. He was also president of Congregation Beth Elohim. He was a sponsor of the Universal Jewish Encyclopedia.

Steinbrink was a trustee and Legal Education Committee chairman of the Brooklyn Bar Association, Law Reform Committee chairman of the New York State Bar Association, vice-president of the Unity Club, a director of the Brooklyn Juvenile Probation Association and the Brooklyn Club, a trustee and counsel of the Brooklyn Hebrew Orphan Asylum, and a member of the Royal Arcanum, the Elks, the Kings County Republican General Committee, and the Brooklyn Rotary Club. He was also a director of the Brooklyn Chamber of Commerce and the Hebrew Educational Society, and a member of the American Bar Association, Sigma Lambda Nu, the Freemasons, and the Inwood Country Club. In 1906, he married Sadie Bloch. Their children were Stuart Henry, a lawyer, and Miriam.

Steinbrink died at home on December 7, 1967.

Party political offices
Preceded by Edward R. O'Malley	Republican nominee for Attorney General of New York; 1912	Succeeded by Egburt E. Woodbury
