= Edward R. O'Malley =

New York politician

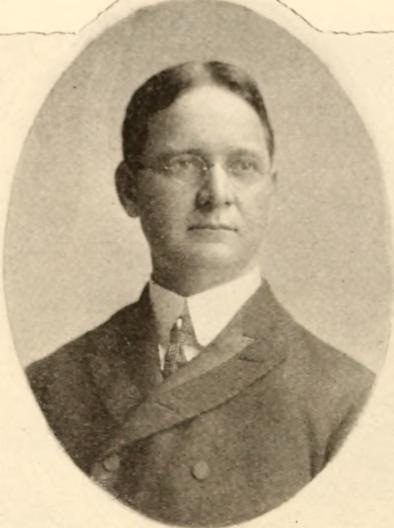
O'Malley c. 1902

Edward Richard O'Malley (March 13, 1863 – May 30, 1935) was an American lawyer and politician who was New York Attorney General and a justice of the New York Supreme Court.

== Life ==
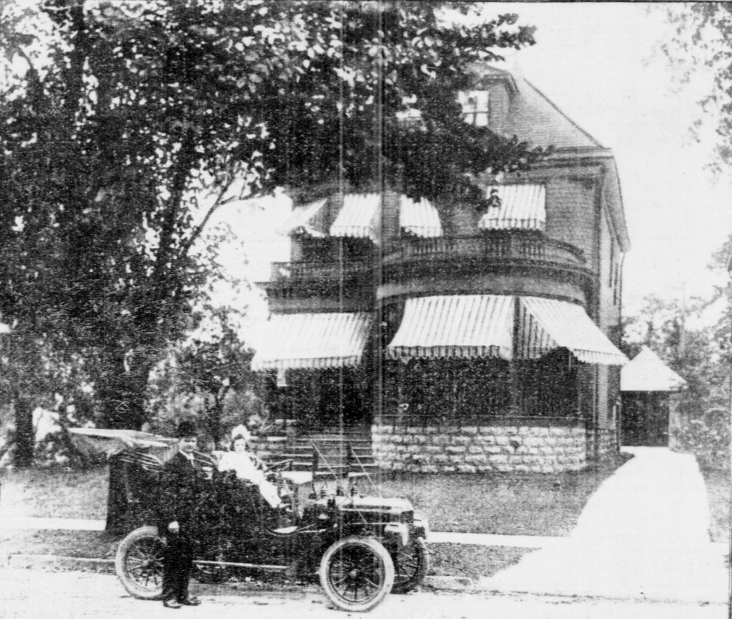
Edward R O'Malley and Daughter Eileen in front of their home at 55 Brantford Place, Buffalo, NY. New-York Tribune, November 1, 1908

He was born on March 13, 1863, in Medina, Orleans County, New York, the son of Michael O'Malley and Bridget (Whalen) O'Malley. He worked on the family farm and attended the union school in Medina. Then he taught school and worked in a stone quarry to pay for tuition at Cornell Law School. He graduated as LL.B. in 1891, and was one of the founding members of the Delta Chi fraternity there.

He went to Buffalo, and became a clerk in the firm of Tabor, Sheehan, Cunneen & Coatsworth. In 1892, he was admitted to the bar, and practiced in Buffalo. He also entered politics as a Republican.

O'Malley was a member of the New York State Assembly (Erie Co., 2nd D.) in 1901 and 1902. He was New York Attorney General from 1909 to 1910, elected at the New York state election, 1908 but defeated for re-election at the New York state election, 1910. For the New York state election, 1914, he lost the Republican primary for Attorney General to Egburt E. Woodbury.

In 1914, he was appointed as Referee to inquire into the "Egg Trust" in New York City.

He was a justice of the New York Supreme Court from 1925 to 1933.

He died on May 30, 1935, in Buffalo, New York; and was buried at the Pine Hill Cemetery there.

== Sources ==
- Media related to Edward R. O'Malley at Wikimedia Commons

Party political offices
Preceded by Julius Marshuetz Mayer	Republican nominee for Attorney General of New York; 1908, 1910	Succeeded by Meier Steinbrink
New York State Assembly
Preceded by Henry W. Hill	New York State Assembly; 1901–1902	Succeeded by Robert L. Cox
Legal offices
Preceded by William S. Jackson	New York Attorney General; 1909–1910	Succeeded by Thomas Carmody
