= Clarence E. Hancock =

American politician

Clarence Eugene Hancock
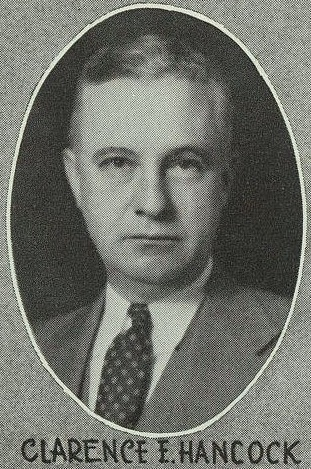

Member of the U.S. House of Representatives from New York
- In office November 8, 1927 – January 3, 1947
- Preceded by: Walter W. Magee
- Succeeded by: R. Walter Riehlman
- Constituency: 35th district (1927–45); 36th district (1945–47)

Corporation Counsel of Syracuse, New York
- In office January 1, 1926 – November 7, 1927
- Preceded by: Frank W. Cregg
- Succeeded by: H. Duane Bruce

Personal details
- Born: February 13, 1885 Syracuse, New York, US
- Died: January 3, 1948 (aged 62) Washington, D.C., US
- Resting place: Woodlawn Cemetery, Syracuse, New York
- Party: Republican
- Spouse: Emily W. Shonk (m. 1912)
- Relations: Theodore E. Hancock (father); Stewart F. Hancock Jr. (nephew)
- Children: 1
- Education: Wesleyan University; New York Law School
- Occupation: Attorney

Military service
- Allegiance: United States
- Branch/service: New York Army National Guard; United States Army
- Years of service: 1916-1917; 1918-1919
- Rank: Captain
- Unit: 1st New York Cavalry Regiment; 27th Division
- Commands: Company D, 104th Machine Gun Battalion
- Battles/wars: Pancho Villa Expedition; World War I: Second Battle of the Somme; Battle of the Lys (1918)
- Awards: Silver Star

Clarence Eugene Hancock (February 13, 1885 – January 3, 1948) was an American attorney and politician from New York. He was most notable for his service as a U.S. representative from 1927 to 1947.

A native of Syracuse, New York, Hancock graduated from Wesleyan University (1906) and New York Law School (1908), then practiced law in Syracuse. A veteran of the Pancho Villa Expedition and World War I, Hancock went on to serve as Syracuse's corporation counsel from 1926 to 1927. A Republican, in 1927 Hancock won a special election for the U.S. House. He was reelected every two years from 1928 to 1944, and served from November 8, 1927, to January 3, 1947.

Hancock did not run for reelection in 1946 because of declining health. He died in Washington, D.C., on January 3, 1948, and was buried at Woodlawn Cemetery in Syracuse.

== Early life ==
Hancock was born in Syracuse, New York, on February 13, 1885, the son of Martha (Connelly) Hancock and Theodore E. Hancock. Theodore Hancock was an attorney and political figure who served as New York Attorney General from 1894 to 1898. Clarence Hancock attended Syracuse's Madison School and graduated from Syracuse Central High School. He then attended Wesleyan University, from which he graduated in 1906, and New York Law School from which he received his LL.B. in 1908. After completing law school, Hancock was admitted to the bar and practiced in Syracuse.

== Military service ==
As a member of the New York National Guard's 1st Cavalry Regiment, Hancock attained the rank of sergeant and served on the Mexican border during the 1916 Pancho Villa Expedition. During World War I, he served in France with the 104th Machine Gun Battalion, a unit of the 27th Division, and attained the rank of captain as commander of the battalion's Company D. He subsequently served as an assistant to the division's judge advocate, J. Leslie Kincaid. The 27th Division commander, John F. O'Ryan, cited Hancock for bravery during combat at Jonc de Mer Ridge, near Le Cateau-Cambrésis, France, on October 18, 1918. During the fighting, Hancock personally conducted front line reconnaissance to determine the best locations to emplace his guns. While under fire throughout the battle, he maintained liaison with the Infantry units his company supported in order to enable their attack. For his heroism, Hancock received the Citation Star. When this award was converted to the Silver Star in 1932, Hancock's decoration was upgraded to the new award.

== Legal career ==
Hancock was Syracuse's corporation counsel from 1926 to 1927. In addition, he was a longtime member of Wesleyan University's board of trustees and the board of directors of the Syracuse Journal newspaper. Hancock was a member of the Onondaga County Bar Association, New York State Bar Association, and Syracuse Chamber of Commerce. From 1928 to 1948, Hancock served as a director of Syracuse's Merchants National Bank and Trust Company.

In addition to his legal career, Hancock was also involved in civic and charitable endeavors, including serving as president of the Syracuse Music Festival Association. In addition, he was vice commander of his American Legion post. Hancock was also an athlete, and was a member of the Sedgwick Farm Club (tennis), Cazenovia Club (golf and tennis), Onondaga Golf and Country Club (golf), and Skaneateles Country Club (golf). Hancock was also a member of several social organizations, including Syracuse's University Club and the Century Club of Syracuse.

== Member of Congress ==
In 1927, Hancock was a successful Republican candidate in a special election for the United States House of Representatives. He was reelected nine times, and served from November 8, 1927, to January 3, 1947. As a member of Congress, Hancock opposed President Franklin D. Roosevelt's New Deal. He served on the Judiciary and Naval Affairs Committees and was also chair of the Republican Congressional Campaign Committee's speaker's bureau. In addition, he served as head of the party's eastern speaker's bureau for the 1936 elections.

== Death and burial ==
Hancock did not run for reelection in 1946 because of ill health. He died in Washington, D.C., on January 3, 1948. Hancock was buried at Woodlawn Cemetery in Syracuse.

== Family ==
In 1912, Hancock married Emily W. Shonk (1885–1974) of Plymouth, Pennsylvania. They were the parents of a son, John S. Hancock (1914–2007), a veteran of World War II who pursued a banking career in Syracuse.

Hancock's brother Stewart Freeman Hancock (1883–1966) was a prominent Syracuse area attorney. Hancock's nephew Stewart F. Hancock Jr. was a judge of the New York Court of Appeals.

== Legacy ==
Syracuse Hancock International Airport and the co-located Hancock Field Air National Guard Base are both named in Hancock's honor. After his death, Hancock's family donated his papers to Syracuse University. They were later transferred to the State University of New York at Albany. Hancock's papers, titled Clarence E. Hancock Papers, 1929–1946, are now part of the state university's M.E. Grenander Department of Special Collections.

== General Reference ==
- Clarence Eugene Hancock Papers,1929-1946. M.E. Grenander Department of Special Collections and Archives, University Libraries, University at Albany, State University of New York (hereafter referred to as the Hancock Papers).

U.S. House of Representatives
Preceded by Walter W. Magee	Member of the U.S. House of Representatives from New York's 35th congressional district 1927–1945	Succeeded by Hadwen C. Fuller
Preceded by John Taber	Member of the U.S. House of Representatives from New York's 36th congressional district 1945–1947	Succeeded by R. Walter Riehlman
