= Erskine C. Rogers =

American lawyer and politician (1878 – 1940)

Erskine Clark Rogers (September 17, 1878 – November 3, 1940) was an American lawyer and New York Supreme Court Justice.

== Life ==
Rogers was born on September 17, 1878, in Sandy Hill, New York, the son of General James C. Rogers and Elizabeth Coleman.

Rogers graduated from Union College with a Ph.B. in 1900. In 1902, he graduated from Albany Law School with an M.A. He was admitted to the bar in 1902. He then worked as a lawyer in Hudson Falls, partnered with John E. Sawyer. He was also vice-president, counsel, and trust officer of the Sandy Hill National Bank.

In 1909, after Washington County District Attorney Robert O. Bascom died, New York governor Charles Evans Hughes appointed Rogers to replace him as District Attorney. He was then elected twice as district attorney, receiving the endorsement of all the parties. While serving as district attorney, he prosecuted the Meadow Prison graft cases, which involved state officials and prominent politicians and contractors. In 1916, when Washington County judge C. R. Paris (Rogers' cousin) resigned, governor Charles S. Whitman appointed him to replace him. He was at the time the youngest county judge in the state. He was then elected back to the office three times. He was also a judge of the Children's Court of Washington County.

In the 1922 New York state election, Rogers was the Republican candidate for Attorney General of New York. He lost to Carl Sherman. In 1922, governor Nathan L. Miller appointed him a commissioner of the Hudson River Regulating District. At the first board meeting, he was appointed its chairman. He was also a member of the convention to consider amendments to the judiciary article of the New York State Constitution.

In 1928, Rogers was elected to the New York Supreme Court. He was still serving on the State Supreme Court when he died. In 1935, he presided the Samuel Druckman murder trials in Brooklyn.

In 1908, Rogers married Helen Annette Wakeman, the paternal granddaughter of Abram Wakeman. Their children were Louise and Erskine C. Jr. He was a member of the Freemasons and the Knights Templar. When he attended Union College, he was a member of Chi Psi. He was also a member of the New York State Bar Association. He was a Presbyterian.

Rogers died at Glenn Falls Hospital on November 3, 1940. He was buried in Union Cemetery in Hudson Falls.

Party political offices
Preceded by Charles D. Newton	Republican nominee for Attorney General of New York; 1922	Succeeded by Albert Ottinger
