= Judge Mayer =

Judge Mayer may refer to:

- Haldane Robert Mayer (born 1941), judge of the United States Court of Appeals for the Federal Circuit
- Julius Marshuetz Mayer (1865–1925), judge of the United States Court of Appeals for the Second Circuit
