= Julius Mayer =

Julius Mayer may refer to:

- Julius Robert von Mayer (1814–1878), German physicist and physician
- Julius Marshuetz Mayer (1865–1925), United States lawyer and federal judge
