= James A. Parsons =

American politician

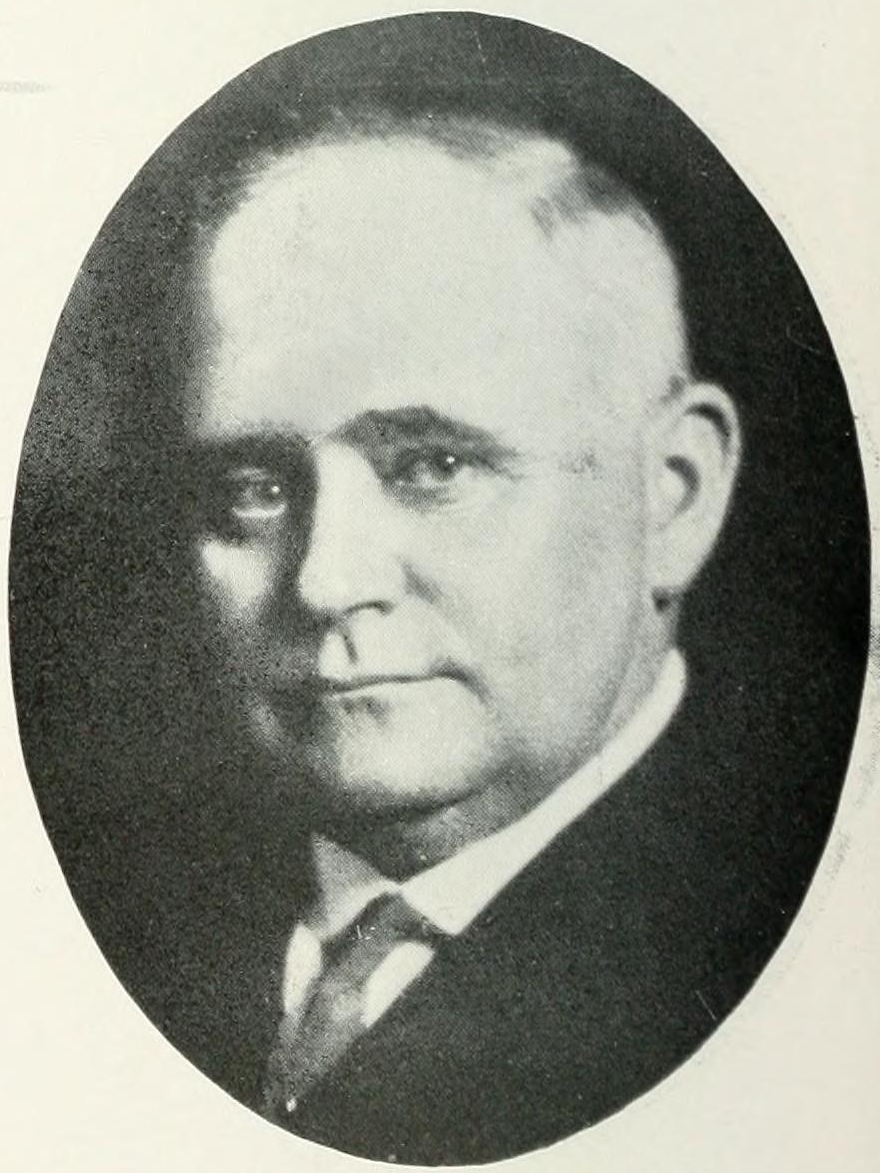
Parsons c. 1914

James Alpheus Parsons (July 24, 1868 – March 4, 1945) was an American lawyer and politician.

== Life ==
James A. Parsons was born in Woodhull, New York on July 24, 1868. He was admitted to the bar of Nebraska in 1890, and moved back to New York in 1893. He then lived in Hornell, New York, where he was at times City Attorney and City Recorder.

In 1911, he was appointed Fourth Deputy Attorney General by Thomas Carmody, and his first task was to resume the Queens graft prosecutions, relieving Arthur Train who had been the Special Deputy Attorney General in charge of the case, appointed by Carmody's predecessor Edward R. O'Malley. Upon Carmody's resignation on September 2, 1914, Parsons was appointed New York State Attorney General by Governor Martin H. Glynn for the remaining four months of Carmody's term. He ran for re-election in November 1914, but was defeated by Republican Egburt E. Woodbury.

He was an alternate delegate to the 1912 Democratic National Convention, and a delegate to the 1920 Democratic National Convention.

He was counsel to Governor Al Smith who appointed him in 1923 New York State Public Service Commissioner, and in 1924 a judge of the New York Court of Claims a post he held until 1936 when he resigned.

He died at his home in Albany on March 4, 1945.

Party political offices
Preceded by Thomas Carmody	Democratic nominee for Attorney General of New York; 1914	Succeeded by William W. Farley
Legal offices
Preceded by Thomas Carmody	New York State Attorney General; 1914	Succeeded by Egburt E. Woodbury
