= William S. Jackson =

American politician

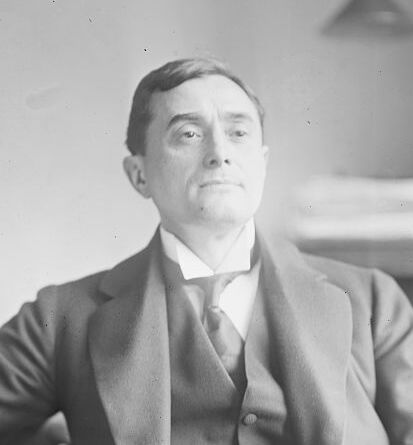
William S. Jackson

William Schuyler Jackson (died November 23, 1932, in Jamaica, Queens, New York City) was an American lawyer and politician.

== Biography ==
Jackson was the son of D. G. Jackson, a lawyer from Tonawanda, New York. In 1892, he married a daughter of Buffalo shoe dealer T. B. Staley. They had two children.

He was First Assistant District Attorney of Erie County when he was elected New York State Attorney General on the Democratic and the Independence League tickets in November 1906. In February 1907, when he was just a month in office, his wife retained Edward E. Coatsworth (the former law partner of William F. Sheehan, Charles F. Tabor and John Cunneen) and announced she would sue for divorce. Two days later, they reconciled.

In 1920, he sent a letter to Governor Al Smith, protesting against the expulsion of five Socialist members (among them Louis Waldman and Sam Dewitt) from the New York State Assembly.

== Sources ==
- JACKSON TO ENFORCE LAW. - Will Deal Rigidly with Trusts and Persons Who Violate It., The AG elect, in NYT on November 8, 1906
- JACKSON DISTRIBUTES OFFICES TO DEMOCRATS - Frank White His First Assistant, C.A. Dolson the Second. A HEARST MAN RECOGNIZED W.A. De Ford Gets a $4,000 Place -- Six Lawyers in Buffalo Also Get Plums. His appointments, in NYT on December 25, 1906
- THE ATTORNEY GENERAL TO BE SUED FOR DIVORCE - Mrs. Jackson Says She Found Evidence in Rochester. RETAINS MR. COATESWORTH Mr. Jackson Quoted as Saying He Will "Get Even" with Former Superior -- Silent on Suit. The suit for divorce announced, in NYT on February 6, 1907
- THE JACKSONS RECONCILED. - Attorney General's Wife Has Abandoned Divorce Suit She Planned. The reconciliation, in NYT on February 8, 1907
- PROTESTS TO GOVERNOR. - W.S. Jackson, Former Attorney General, Criticises Assembly's Action. His letter to al Smith, in NYT on January 24, 1920
- Political Graveyard
- List of New York Attorneys General, at Office of the NYSAG

Legal offices
Preceded by Julius Marshuetz Mayer	New York State Attorney General; 1907–1908	Succeeded by Edward R. O'Malley
