= James Breck Perkins =

American politician

James B. Perkins
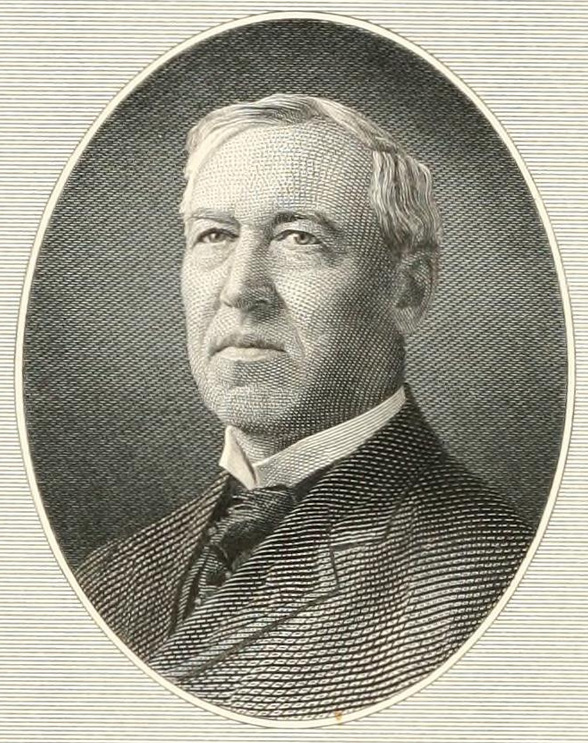

Member of the U.S. House of Representatives from New York
- In office March 4, 1901 – March 11, 1910
- Preceded by: James M.E. O'Grady
- Succeeded by: James S. Havens
- Constituency: 31st district (1901–03); 32nd district (1903–10)

Personal details
- Born: James Breck Perkins; November 4, 1847 St. Croix Falls, Territory of Wisconsin, U.S.
- Died: March 11, 1910 (aged 62) Washington, D.C., U.S.
- Party: Republican
- Children: James D. Havens
- Education: University of Rochester

James Breck Perkins (November 4, 1847 – March 11, 1910) was an American historian, a United States congressman, and a writer.

He was born in St. Croix Falls, Wisconsin, and graduated from the University of Rochester, where he was a member of St. Anthony Hall, in 1867. He served as city attorney of Rochester, New York, from 1874 to 1878; was a member of the New York State Assembly (Monroe Co., 1st D.) in 1898; and served as a representative in Congress from 1901 until his death.

Recognized as the leading authority in the particular historical field to which he devoted himself, he was honored by membership in the National Institute of Arts and Letters. His writings include:

- France under Mazarin (1887)
- France under Louis XV (1897)
- Richelieu (1900), in the "Heroes of the Nations Series"
- France in the American Revolution (1911)

He died in Washington, D.C.

== See also ==
- List of members of the United States Congress who died in office (1900–1949)

New York State Assembly
Preceded by Merton E. Lewis	New York State Assembly; Monroe County, 1st District; 1898	Succeeded by Merton E. Lewis
U.S. House of Representatives
Preceded by James M. E. O'Grady	Member of the U.S. House of Representatives from New York's 31st congressional district 1901–1903	Succeeded by Sereno E. Payne
Preceded by William H. Ryan	Member of the U.S. House of Representatives from New York's 32nd congressional district 1903–1910	Succeeded by James S. Havens
