= John C. Davies II =

American politician (1920–2002)

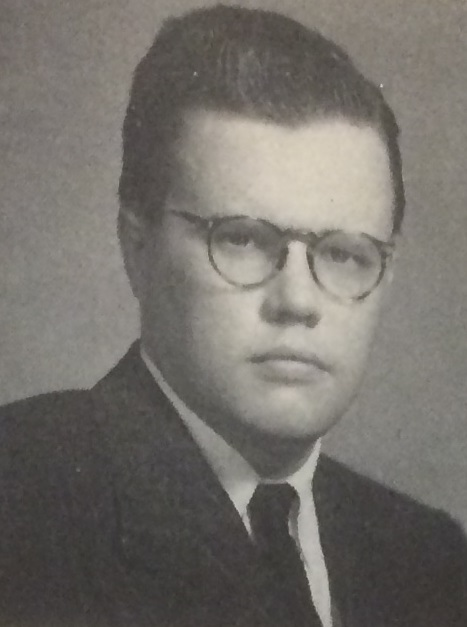

Member of the U.S. House of Representatives from New York's 35th district
- In office January 3, 1949 – January 3, 1951
- Preceded by: Hadwen C. Fuller
- Succeeded by: William R. Williams

Personal details
- Born: May 1, 1920 Albany, New York
- Died: June 17, 2002 (aged 82) San Juan, Puerto Rico
- Party: Democratic
- Education: University of Alabama; Hamilton College

John Clay Davies II (May 1, 1920 – June 17, 2002) was an American businessman and politician who served one term as a Democratic United States representative from New York, serving a single term from 1949 to 1951.

== Biography ==
Born in Albany, he was the son of Dorothy (née Dorrance) and John Davies and grandson of John Clay Davies, who served as New York Attorney General. The older of two children, Davies graduated from Camden High School, and attended the University of Alabama at Tuscaloosa and Hamilton College (in Clinton, New York).

=== Early career ===
He was editor of the Camden Chronicle in 1940 and 1941, and maintained public relations offices in Albany from 1941 to 1943. He was with the public relations department of Westinghouse Electric Corp. in New York City from 1943 to 1946, and was vice president of the Earle Ferris Co. Inc., in New York City from 1946 to 1948. From 1948 to 1953 he was a partner in a public relations business in Utica, New York.

=== Congress ===
Davies was elected as a Democrat to the 81st Congress. He won a close election by just 138 votes, and served one term, January 3, 1949 to January 3, 1951. He was an unsuccessful candidate for reelection to the 82nd Congress in 1950.

=== Later career and death ===
After leaving Congress Davies served as Deputy County Clerk for Oneida County.

He was later a writer and a public relations executive in San Juan, Puerto Rico, where he died on June 17, 2002.

U.S. House of Representatives
Preceded by Hadwen C. Fuller	Member of the U.S. House of Representatives from New York's 35th congressional district 1949–1951	Succeeded by William R. Williams
