= Cassville, New York =

- hamlet
- Location of Cassville in New York
- Coordinates: 42°56′45″N 75°15′16″W
- Country: United States
- State: New York
- County: Oneida
- Town: Paris
- ZIP code: 13318
- Area codes: 315 and 680

Cassville is a hamlet in Oneida County, New York, United States. Cassville is situated on and adjacent to New York State Route 8 in the town of Paris.

== Notable people ==
- Brad Roberts, an ice hockey player for the Youngstown SteelHounds, is a Cassville native.
- William R. Williams (1884–1972), a Republican member of the United States House of Representatives from New York, lived and died in Cassville.

== See also ==
- List of places named for Lewis Cass
