= Henry G. Danforth =

American politician (1854–1918)

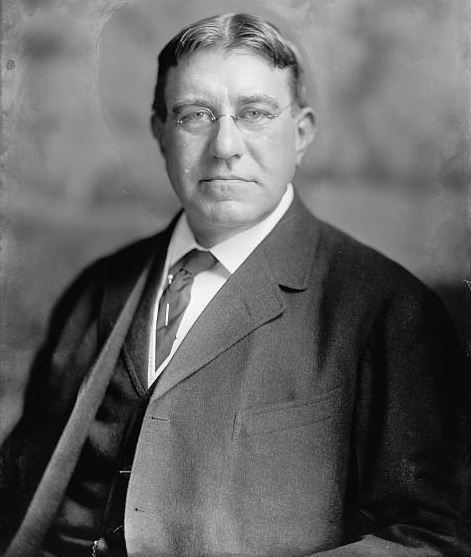
- Danforth, 1905–1918

Member of the U.S. House of Representatives from New York
- In office March 4, 1911 – March 3, 1917
- Preceded by: James S. Havens
- Succeeded by: Archie D. Sanders
- Constituency: 32nd district (1911–13); 39th district (1913–17)

Personal details
- Born: June 14, 1854 Gates, New York
- Died: April 8, 1918 (aged 63) Rochester, New York
- Party: Republican
- Education: Harvard University

Henry Gold Danforth (June 14, 1854 – April 8, 1918) was a U.S. representative from New York.

Born in the town of Gates, New York (now part of Rochester), Danforth attended private schools in Rochester, New York, and Phillips Exeter Academy, Exeter, New Hampshire. He graduated from the collegiate department of Harvard University in 1877 and from the law department in 1880. He was admitted to the bar in 1880 and commenced practice in Rochester. He served as director of the Rochester General Hospital 1889-1918. He served as member of the board of managers of the New York State Reformatory, Elmira, New York from 1900 to 1902. Trustee of the Reynolds Library 1906–1918.

Danforth was elected as a Republican to the Sixty-second, Sixty-third, and Sixty-fourth Congresses (March 4, 1911 – March 3, 1917). He was an unsuccessful candidate for renomination in 1916. He resumed the practice of law. He died in Rochester, New York, April 8, 1918. He was interred in Mount Hope Cemetery.

U.S. House of Representatives
| Preceded by James S. Havens | Member of the U.S. House of Representatives from New York's 32nd congressional district 1911–1913 | Succeeded by Luther W. Mott |
| New district | Member of the U.S. House of Representatives from New York's 39th congressional district 1913–1917 | Succeeded by Archie D. Sanders |
