= Charles D. Newton =

American politician

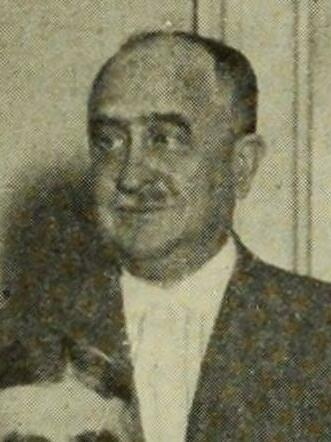
Charles D. Newton

Charles Damon Newton (May 25, 1861, in Birdsall, Allegany County, New York – October 30, 1930, in Geneseo, Livingston County, New York) was an American lawyer and politician.

== Life ==
He was the son of Daniel Newton and Polly A. Brundage Newton. On August 10, 1887, he married Nellie E. Durfee.

He was a member of the New York State Senate (43rd D.) from 1915 to 1918, sitting in the 138th, 139th, 140th and 141st New York State Legislatures.

He was New York Attorney General from 1919 to 1922, elected on the Republican ticket at the New York state election, 1918, and re-elected at the New York state election, 1920.

== Sources ==
- Political Graveyard

Party political offices
Preceded by Merton E. Lewis	Republican nominee for Attorney General of New York; 1918, 1920	Succeeded by Erskine C. Rogers
New York State Senate
Preceded by John Seeley	New York State Senate; 1915–1918	Succeeded by William A. Carson
Legal offices
Preceded by Merton E. Lewis	New York Attorney General; 1919–1922	Succeeded by Carl Sherman
