= Cornelius R. Parsons =

American politician

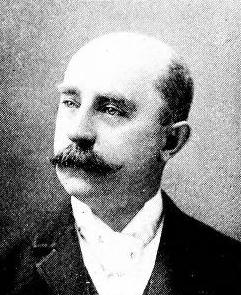

40th Mayor of Rochester
- In office 1876–1890

Member of the New York Senate from the 43rd district
- In office January 1, 1896 – January 30, 1901
- Preceded by: new district
- Succeeded by: Merton E. Lewis

Member of the New York Senate from the 28th district
- In office January 1, 1894 – December 31, 1895
- Preceded by: Charles T. Saxton
- Succeeded by: Edgar T. Brackett

Member of the New York Senate from the 29th district
- In office January 1, 1892 – December 31, 1893
- Preceded by: Donald McNaughton
- Succeeded by: Cuthbert W. Pound

Member of the New York State Assembly from the Monroe County, 2nd district
- In office January 1, 1891 – December 31, 1891
- Preceded by: Robert Courtney
- Succeeded by: Richard Curran

Personal details
- Born: May 22, 1842 York, New York, U.S.
- Died: January 30, 1901 (aged 59) Rochester, New York, U.S.
- Party: Republican
- Spouse: Frances Whitbeck

Cornelius R. Parsons (May 22, 1842 in York, New York – January 30, 1901 in Rochester, New York) was Mayor of Rochester for seven consecutive two-year terms between 1876 and 1890.

He was the son of State Senator Thomas Parsons (1814–1873). He was a lumber mill co-owner. He was elected to City Council in 1867. He was a member of the New York State Assembly (Monroe Co., 2nd D.) in 1891. He was a member of the New York State Senate from 1892 until his death in 1901, sitting in the 115th, 116th (both 29th D.), 117th, 118th (both 28th D.), 119th, 120th, 121st, 122nd, 123rd and 124th New York State Legislatures (all six 43rd D.).

Political offices
Preceded by George A. Clarkson	Mayor of Rochester, New York; 1876–1890	Succeeded by William Carroll
New York State Assembly
Preceded by Robert Courtney	New York State Assembly; Monroe County, 2nd District; 1891	Succeeded by Richard Curran
New York State Senate
Preceded by Donald McNaughton	New York State Senate; 29th District; 1892–1893	Succeeded by Cuthbert W. Pound
Preceded by Charles T. Saxton	New York State Senate; 28th District; 1894–1895	Succeeded by Edgar T. Brackett
Preceded by new district	New York State Senate; 43rd District; 1896–1901	Succeeded by Merton E. Lewis
