= John C. Davies (lawyer) =

American lawyer and politician (1857–1925)

John Clay Davies
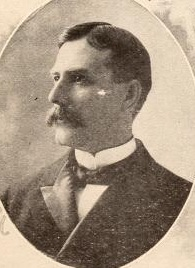
- Davies in 1900
- Born: January 1857; Utica, New York, U.S.
- Died: January 10, 1925 (aged 67–68); Camden, New York, U.S.
- Education: Hamilton College
- Occupations: Lawyer, politician
- Board member of: New York State Assembly, State Board on Gas and Electricity

John Clay Davies (January 1857 – January 10, 1925) was an American lawyer and politician.

== Life ==
He was born in January 1857 in Utica, Oneida County, New York. He attended Hamilton College for a short time. He was admitted to the bar in 1878, and practiced in Camden.

He was a member of the New York State Assembly (Oneida Co., 3rd D.) in 1887.

He was Deputy Attorney General under Theodore E. Hancock from 1894 to 1898. He was a delegate to the New York State Constitutional Convention of 1894. He was New York Attorney General from 1899 to 1902, elected at the New York state election, 1898, and re-elected at the New York state election, 1900. He was a delegate to the 1900 Republican National Convention. In 1902, he was the Republican candidate for Justice of the New York Supreme Court in the heavily Republican Fifth Judicial District, but was defeated in a landslide by Democrat Watson M. Rogers. Even his party fellows had accused him of incompetence, and had favored the nomination of an independent candidate.

In 1905, he was appointed a Commissioner of the State Board on Gas and Electricity (State Lighting Commission) by Governor Frank W. Higgins.

He died on January 10, 1925, in Camden, New York.

Congressman John C. Davies II (1920–2002) was his grandson.

== Sources ==
New York State Assembly
Preceded by Israel J. White	New York State Assembly; Oneida County, 3rd District; 1887	Succeeded by George Beatty, Jr.
Legal offices
Preceded by Theodore E. Hancock	New York State Attorney General; 1899–1902	Succeeded by John Cunneen
