= Merton E. Lewis =

American politician

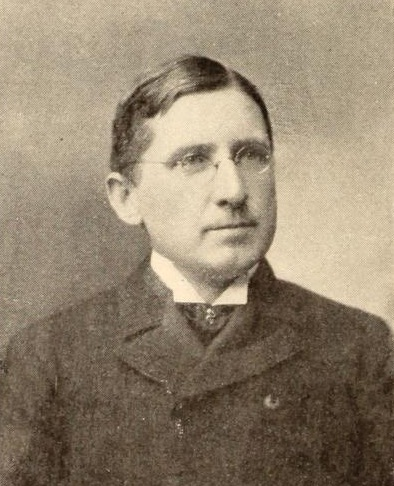
- Lewis in 1902

51st Attorney General of New York
- In office April 25, 1917 – December 31, 1918
- Governor: Charles Seymour Whitman
- Preceded by: Egburt E. Woodbury
- Succeeded by: Charles D. Newton

Member of the New York State Senate from the 43rd district
- In office January 1, 1902 – December 31, 1906
- Preceded by: Cornelius R. Parsons
- Succeeded by: William J. Tully

Member of the New York State Assembly from Monroe County, 1st district
- In office January 1, 1897 – December 31, 1897
- Preceded by: Charles J. Smith
- Succeeded by: James B. Perkins
- In office January 1, 1899 – December 31, 1901
- Preceded by: James B. Perkins
- Succeeded by: Martin Davis

44th Mayor of Rochester, New York
- In office January 22, 1895 – December 31, 1895
- Preceded by: George W. Aldridge
- Succeeded by: George E. Warner

Personal details
- Born: December 10, 1861 Webster, New York, U.S.
- Died: May 2, 1937 (aged 75) Rochester, New York, U.S.
- Party: Republican
- Spouse: Adeline Louise Moody
- Profession: Attorney

Merton Elmer Lewis (December 10, 1861 – May 2, 1937) was an American lawyer and politician who served as the 51st Attorney General of New York state.

== Life ==
He was born on December 10, 1861, in Webster, Monroe County, New York, the son of Charles Chadwick Lewis (b. 1826) and Rhoda Ann (Willard) Lewis. He graduated from Webster Union School, then studied law with James B. Perkins at Rochester. He was admitted to the bar in 1887, and commenced practice in Rochester. On January 2, 1886, he married Adeline Louise Moody (1866-1894).

He was delegate to the New York State Constitutional Convention of 1894. He was an alderman of Rochester from 1891 on, and became President of the Common Council in 1894. He was elevated to Acting Mayor of Rochester after the resignation of George W. Aldridge on January 22, 1895. Lewis worked closely with Aldridge, and opponents of Aldridge's machine organized a Good Government League to make local elections non-partisan. Lewis did not run in the 1895 mayoral election and focused on election to the state legislature after stepping down.

He was a member of the New York State Assembly (Monroe Co., 1st D.) in 1897, 1899, 1900 and 1901; and of the New York State Senate (43rd D.) from 1902 to 1906, sitting in the 125th, 126th, 127th, 128th and 129th New York State Legislatures.

At the New York state election, 1906, he ran for New York State Comptroller, but except for Governor Charles Evans Hughes, the whole Republican ticket was narrowly defeated by the ticket nominated by the Democratic Party and the Independence League.

In January 1915, he was appointed as First Deputy by Attorney General Egburt E. Woodbury. Woodbury resigned on April 19, 1917, and six days later Lewis was elected New York Attorney General by joint ballot of the New York State Legislature, with Lewis receiving all 173 votes of the Democrats and Republicans in the legislature, and Morris Hillquit receiving 2 votes from the Socialist members. He remained in office for the remainder of Woodbury's term, which ended in 1918.

In 1918, he declined to run for re-election and ran in the Republican primary for governor instead, with the support of Aldridge's machine in Rochester. In August 1918, he urged the Republican voters to repudiate his opponent, the incumbent Governor Charles S. Whitman, because Whitman was backed by William Randolph Hearst whom he accused of having undermined the United States war effort against Germany. Whitman was re-nominated but was defeated in the election by Al Smith.

He died on May 2, 1937, in Rochester, New York.

Party political offices
Preceded by Otto Kelsey	Republican nominee for New York State Comptroller; 1906	Succeeded by Charles H. Gaus
Preceded by Egburt E. Woodbury	Republican nominee for Attorney General of New York; 1917	Succeeded by Charles D. Newton
Political offices
Preceded by George W. Aldridge	Mayor of Rochester, NY; Acting; 1895–1896	Succeeded by George E. Warner
New York State Assembly
Preceded by Charles J. Smith	New York State Assembly; Monroe County, 1st District; 1897	Succeeded by James B. Perkins
Preceded by James B. Perkins	New York State Assembly; Monroe County, 1st District; 1899–1901	Succeeded by Martin Davis
New York State Senate
Preceded by Cornelius R. Parsons	New York State Senate; 43rd District; 1902–1906	Succeeded by William J. Tully
Legal offices
Preceded by Egburt E. Woodbury	New York Attorney General; 1917–1918	Succeeded by Charles D. Newton
