= George B. Adams =

American judge (1845–1911)

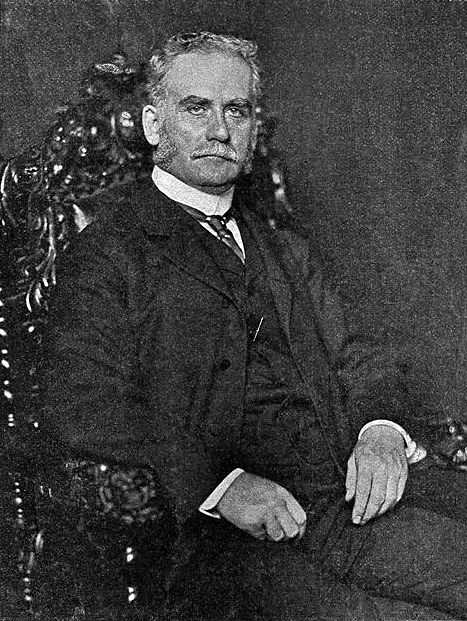

Judge of the United States District Court for the Southern District of New York
- In office August 30, 1901 – October 9, 1911
- Appointed by: William McKinley (recess); Theodore Roosevelt (commission)
- Preceded by: Addison Brown
- Succeeded by: Julius Marshuetz Mayer

Personal details
- Born: George Bethune Adams; April 3, 1845; Philadelphia, Pennsylvania, U.S.
- Died: October 9, 1911 (aged 66); Hague, New York, U.S.
- Education: Read law

George Bethune Adams (April 3, 1845 – October 9, 1911) was a United States lawyer and federal judge specializing in admiralty law. He served in private practice, litigated before the Supreme Court of the United States, and served as a United States district judge of the United States District Court for the Southern District of New York.

== Early life and career ==
Adams was born in Philadelphia, Pennsylvania. Though under the minimum age, he enlisted in a Pennsylvania regiment in the United States Army in 1861, and served for three months before returning to school. He reenlisted in 1863 when Robert E. Lee's forces invaded Pennsylvania, and afterwards entered the Quartermaster's Department of the Army, where he served until 1871. He then worked as a merchant for several years. He read law and became a lawyer in Philadelphia in 1878. He was thereafter in private practice in New York City, New York from 1883 to 1901, specializing in admiralty law at the firm of Beebe & Wilcox; after the death of Judge Beebe in 1884, he became a name partner and the firm was renamed Wilcox, Adams & Green. There, he litigated before the Supreme Court of the United States in admiralty cases such as The Kate. Adams was Secretary of the Union League Club of New York in 1894 and 1895.

== Federal judicial service ==
When Judge Addison Brown resigned his seat on the United States District Court for the Southern District of New York, the members of the Admiralty Bar adopted a resolution in July 1901 asking the president to appoint Adams. He received a recess appointment to that seat from President William McKinley on August 30, 1901, and, following McKinley's assassination on September 14, 1901, was formally nominated to the seat by President Theodore Roosevelt on December 5, 1901. The United States Senate confirmed Adams on December 17, 1901, and he received his commission the same day.

When appointed, Adams was the only judge in the district. The workload resulting from new federal bankruptcy laws caused his health to break down two years later; though three other judges were appointed to the district, Adams's health never fully recovered, but he served until his death, focusing on the maritime cases that were his specialty.

== Family and death ==
In 1904, Adams married the former Helen Jean Balfour. Adams died in Hague, New York on October 9, 1911, after two years' illness. His will was fifteen words long: "I give and bequeath all my estate to my wife and appoint her my executrix." There were no children.

Mrs. Adams served the cause of the New York Women's League for Animals for decades after her husband's death—despite being bitten by animals 71 times over the course of her service. She died in 1950 at the age of 101.

Legal offices
| Preceded by Addison Brown | Judge of the United States District Court for the Southern District of New York; 1901–1911 | Succeeded by Julius Marshuetz Mayer |
