= Addison Brown =

American judge, botanist, and amateur astronomer (1830–1913)

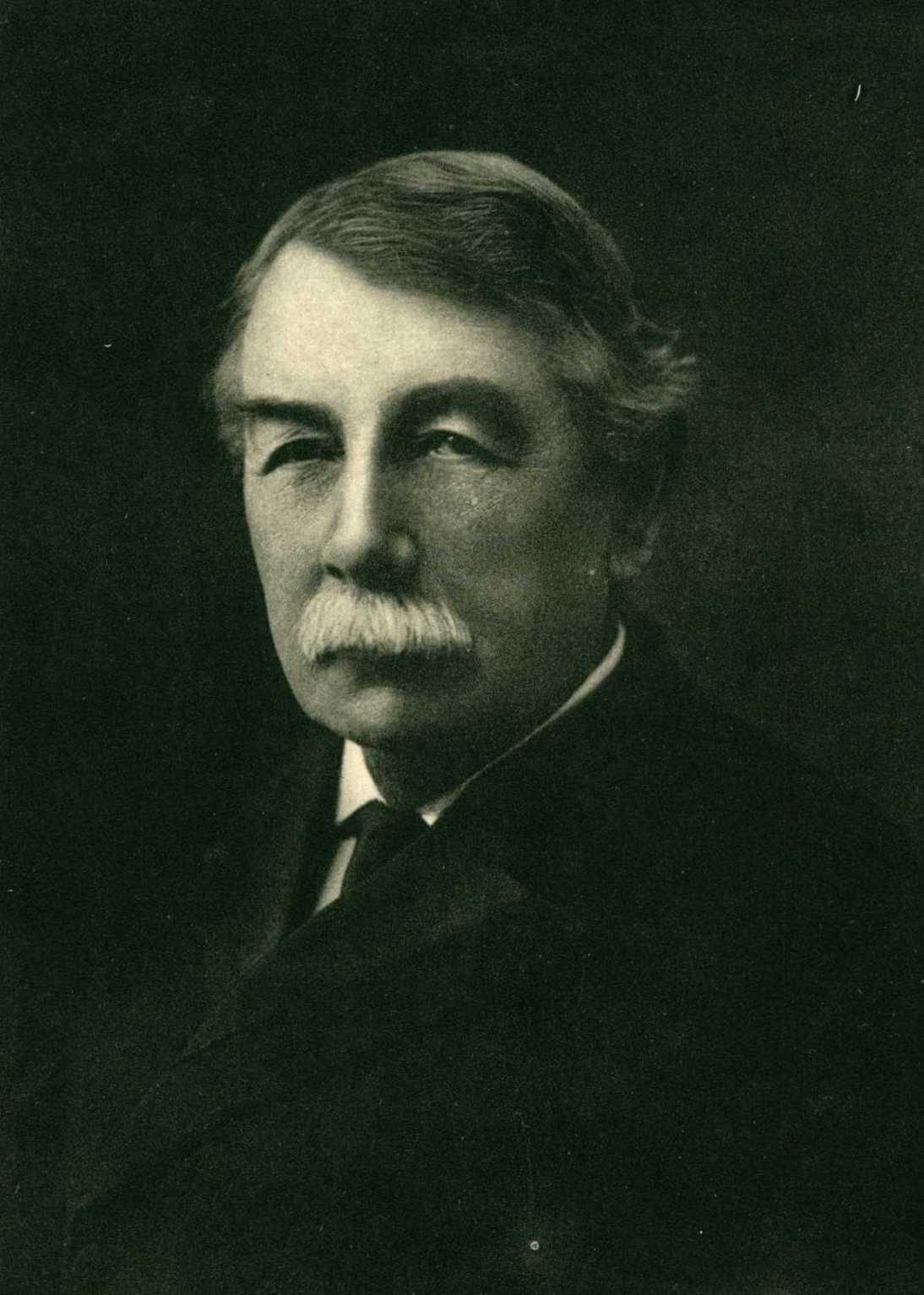

Judge of the United States District Court for the Southern District of New York
- In office June 2, 1881 – August 30, 1901
- Appointed by: James A. Garfield (recess); Chester A. Arthur (commission)
- Preceded by: William Gardner Choate
- Succeeded by: George B. Adams

Personal details
- Born: Addison C. Brown; February 21, 1830 West Newbury, Massachusetts, U.S.
- Died: April 9, 1913 (aged 83) New York City, U.S.
- Resting place: Woodlawn Cemetery; The Bronx, New York City
- Party: Republican
- Spouses: Mary Chadwick Barrett (m. 1854; died 1887) Helen Carpenter Gaskin (m. 1893)
- Children: 4
- Relatives: Henry B. R. Brown (grandson)
- Education: Harvard University (A.B.); Harvard Law School (LL.B.)

Addison C. Brown (February 21, 1830 – April 9, 1913) was a United States district judge of the United States District Court for the Southern District of New York, a botanist, and a serious amateur astronomer.

== Early life, education and career ==
Addison Brown was born on February 21, 1830, in West Newbury, Massachusetts, the oldest of five children of Addison Brown Sr., a shoemaker, and Catherine Babson Griffin, both descended from Massachusetts' earliest Pilgrim settlers. He attended West Newbury's one-room school until he had exhausted its offerings at age 12. In 1843 he began more advanced studies in such areas as Latin, physics, algebra, and philosophy.

In 1848 Brown entered Amherst College, intending from the start to transfer to Harvard University in his sophomore year. While at Harvard, Brown earned money as the college organist and unhappily spent some summer months as a village school teacher. Brown befriended and roomed with his Harvard classmate Horatio Alger and counted Ephraim Whitman Gurney (who became a professor of philosophy and history and dean of the Harvard faculty) as his closest college friend.

Brown received an Artium Baccalaureus degree in 1852 from Harvard University, ranked second in his class. Joseph Hodges Choate, who became a lawyer and diplomat, was ranked third. Joseph's brother, William Gardner Choate, who preceded Brown in the United States District Court for the Southern District of New York, was valedictorian; George B. Adams, Brown's successor on the bench, was also a member of the class of 1852. To restore his health after years dedicated to study, Brown spent the summer of 1852 working aboard a fishing boat, sailing out of Gloucester, Massachusetts to Prince Edward Island.

In his Autobiographical Notes, Brown wrote that a college graduate in his circumstances had three career choices: the ministry, medicine or the law. He "knew nothing of the law, or of lawyers personally, ... and disliked the life of a physician." After consideration, he deemed himself ill-suited for the ministry: "Only law remained." Upon learning that he could save almost half of the cost of a Harvard law degree by working and studying in a law office for a year, Brown returned home to the law offices of John James Marsh. Brown entered Harvard Law School in 1853, receiving a Bachelor of Laws in late 1854.

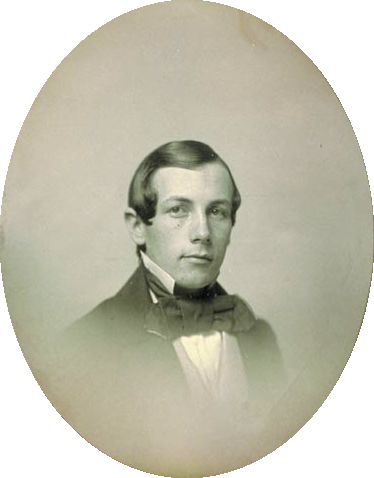
Addison Brown by Whipple, 1852.

=== Law practice ===
Armed with introductions from a Harvard professor, in December 1854 Brown arrived in New York City, New York (whose burgeoning business community Brown found more promising than opportunities in his native small-town northeast Massachusetts) and began work as a clerk for the firm of Brown (unrelated), Hall (then-New York's mayor), and Vanderpoel. There he met other lawyers, learned about the practice of law, and studied for the New York bar examination, which he passed in February 1855. In that year he began developing a small portfolio of clients of his own and supplemented his income with work as organist and choir director in the Episcopal Church in Newton, Long Island.

Brown struck out on his own and then joined Nelson Smith in 1856. In 1857 he partnered with Edwin E. Bogardus, who had an established and varied law practice, to form the firm of Bogardus and Brown. That firm prospered until its dissolution in May 1864, when Brown formed Stanley, Langdell & Brown with longtime friends. He remained in that partnership (later named Stanley, Brown & Clarke when Langdell left to become dean of Harvard Law School) until his judicial appointment in 1881.

=== Investment ventures ===
Brown stated that when deciding on a path after college, he found a business career not to his taste, inasmuch as he had no interest in "mere wealth" or a "life of money-making." He did, however, participate in business ventures and accrue considerable wealth. In the late 1850s he began investing in and doing legal work for real estate transactions in which large areas of land at the edges of development in New York City were subdivided and sold at considerable profit.

His success was such that prosperous individuals in Brown's hometown of West Newbury and surrounding areas entrusted him to invest their funds, providing the investors a 7% return and Brown any amounts over that. This allowed him to engage in more real estate ventures. Brown stated, "The handling of considerable funds in that way for many years not only brought me considerable gains beyond my law business proper, but also gave me much credit as a responsible person, and attracted clients in the building business, and it thus much enlarged my own contributions to our strictly law practice."

== Federal judicial service ==
Brown received a recess appointment from President James A. Garfield on June 2, 1881, to a seat on the U.S. District Court for the Southern District of New York. On October 12, 1881, President Chester A. Arthur nominated him to the same position. Brown's United States Senate confirmation took place on October 14, 1881; he received his commission the same day. Brown had become a member of his local Republican club in the late 1850s and remained active in Republican politics while neither seeking nor obtaining a political position prior to his judgeship.

Brown's 20-year judgeship was described as prolific and distinguished. He was credited as having written between 1,600 to over 2,000 decisions, many of them concerning admiralty, bankruptcy, and extradition. His most famous case involved the libel charges against journalist Charles Anderson Dana brought by the administration of Ulysses S. Grant. Brown refused to extradite Dana from New York to Washington, D.C., holding that before extradition may occur, an offense must be shown and regular procedures followed.

Due to physical disabilities, Brown resigned from the court in 1901. The New York Times stated upon his retirement that Brown was "regarded as one of the most hard-working and painstaking Judges on the bench." In the year following his retirement, Harvard honored him with an LL.D.

== Botany and astronomy ==
Newspaper accounts called Brown not only a great jurist, but also a great scientist, learned as a botanist and to a lesser degree as an astronomer. Obituaries noted his versatility and compared him to polymath poet and doctor Oliver Wendell Holmes Sr. Modern sources have also recognized his wide range of pursuits and accomplishments.

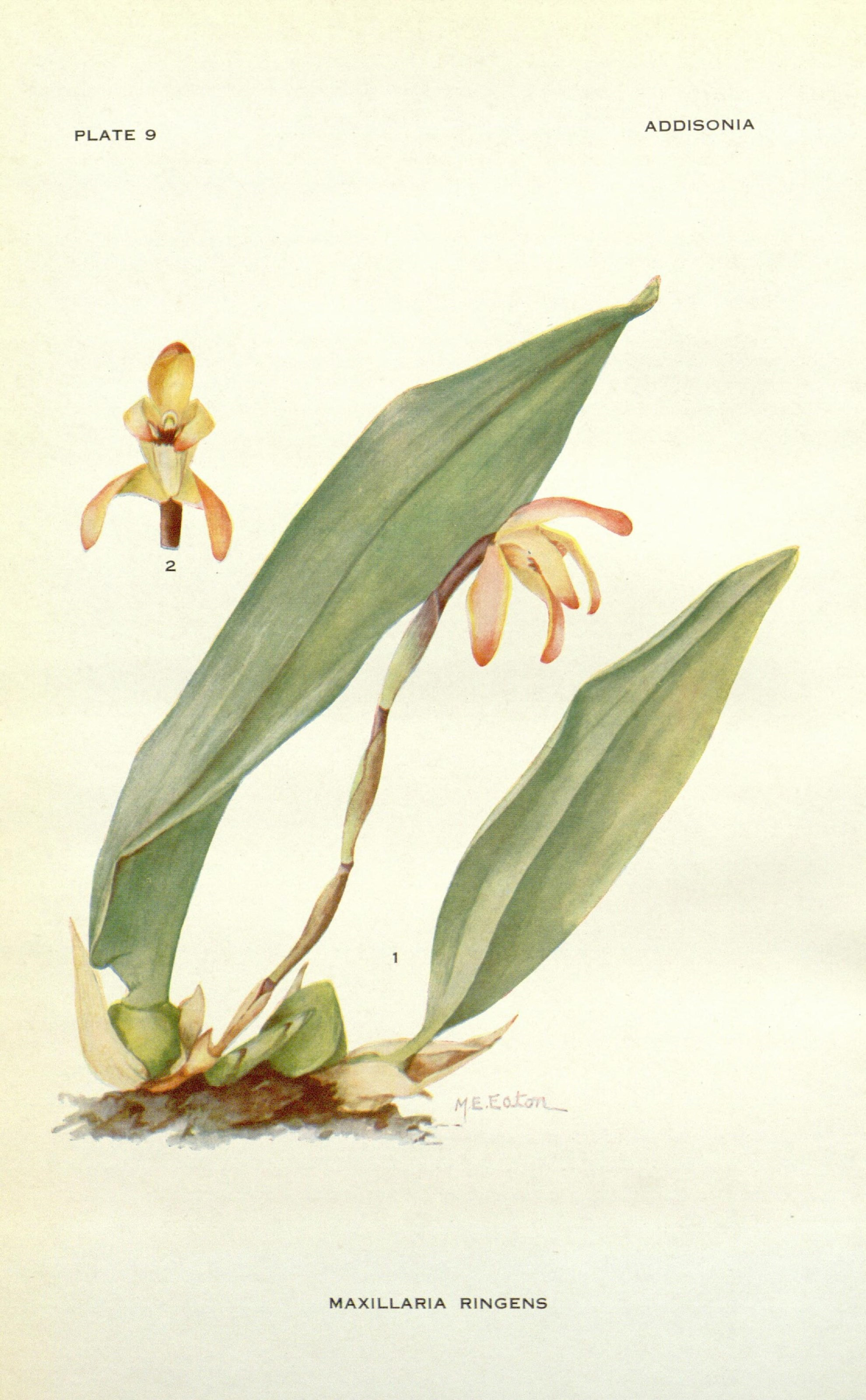
Addisonia (PLATE 009) (8575333844) from the botany journal Addison Brown endowed.

In 1875, Brown joined the Torrey Botanical Club of Columbia College in New York and was an active member for many years, serving as president from 1893 to 1905. As the club's president, Brown served on the Botanical Garden Committee and became a principal founder of the New York Botanical Garden. Brown cited his role in the Botanical Garden's founding as his most significant public service, aside from his work in the judiciary. He wrote that organization's charter in 1891 and in that year donated the initial $25,000 (which he viewed as "quite out of proportion to my means at that time") toward the $250,000 in private seed money required pursuant to the New York legislature's authorization for municipal contributions.

Brown traveled to collect botanical specimens, maintained an extensive botanical library, wrote many notes for Torrey Botanical Club publications and published the following works:

- Illustrated Flora of the Northern United States and Canada (three volumes, 1896–98; new edition, 1913 — with Nathaniel L. Britton)
- The Elgin Botanical Garden and its Relation to Columbia College and the New Hampshire Grants (1908)

At age 81, Brown began work on a revised and expanded edition of Illustrated Flora, which contained over 2,000 pages and some 5,000 illustrations. With his co-author Britton, he worked on this for the rest of his life, even as his health failed. Brown died four days after the first bound copies were shipped.

At his death, Brown's single largest charitable bequest—200 shares of United States Steel preferred stock worth $21,750 in 1913—was to the New York Botanical Garden to endow a botanical journal. The periodical was to be named for Brown and to contain color plates illustrating plants of the United States and its territories. This publication, named Addisonia, was issued between 1916 and 1964.

Brown was also a serious amateur astronomer. He was a founding member of the New York Academy of Science's astronomy section. Brown's Colorado mountaintop observations of the July 29, 1878 solar eclipse were included in a report of the United States Naval Observatory.

== Personal life and death ==
Brown met his first wife, Mary Chadwick Barrett, in 1846 at Bradford Academy, near West Newbury, as he studied to prepare for college. Together they studied astronomy, in which she excelled. Informally engaged since his days at Amherst, they married on January 1, 1856, when financially able to maintain a household. She was disabled by illness before their marriage. Notwithstanding various cures meeting with mixed success, her physical and mental condition worsened until her death in 1887.

In July 1893, Brown married Helen Carpenter Gaskin, a botany teacher at the New York Normal College, which later became Hunter College. He was in his 60s; she was considerably younger. One newspaper report stated that the bride was said to be attractive and charming: "Not a little romance is connected with their courtship." Others described surprise that Brown, active in numerous elite New York social clubs, managed to keep the impending wedding secret. The couple pursued joint scientific interests, and had three sons and a daughter.

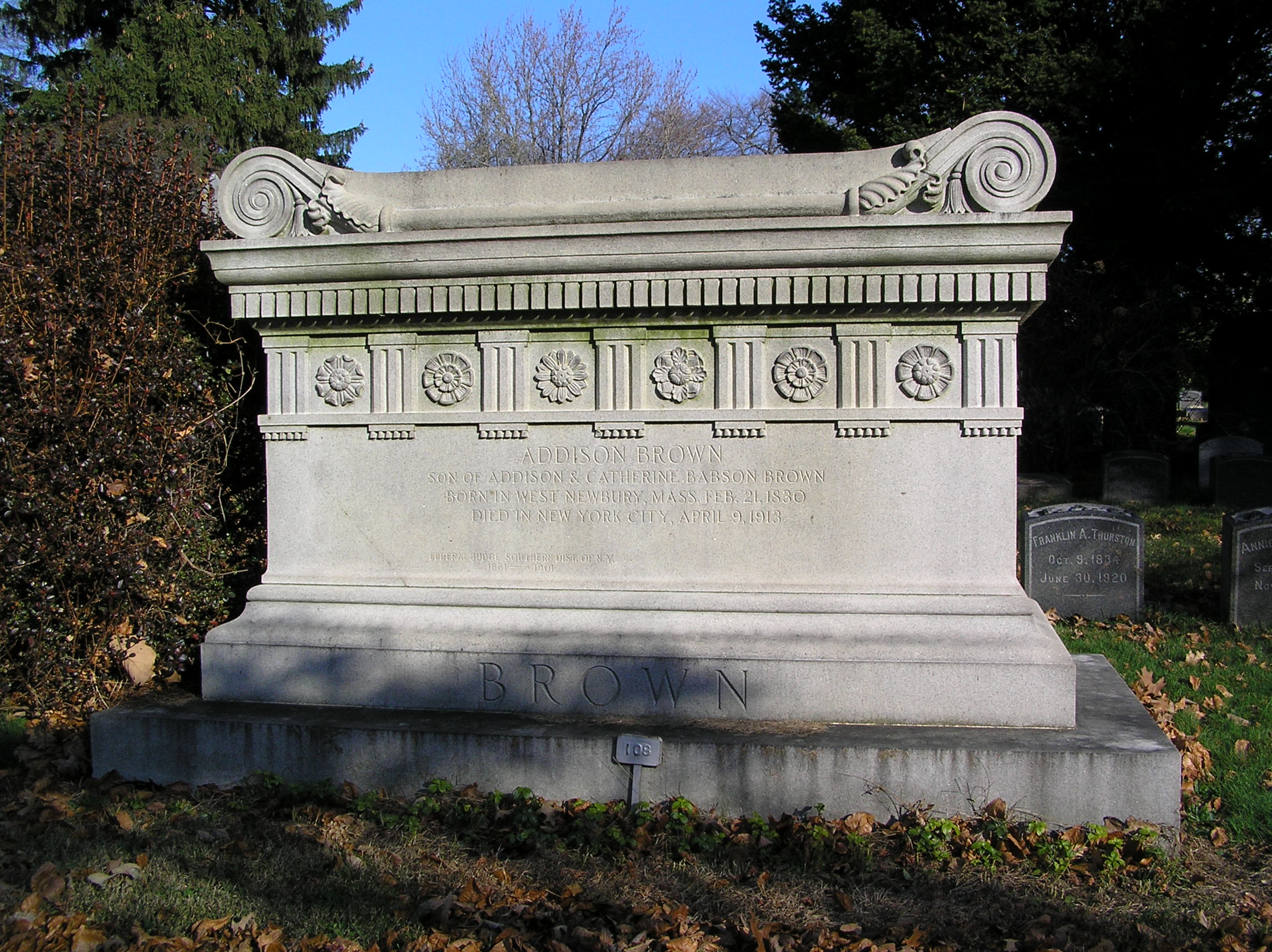
The sarcophagus of Addison Brown in Woodlawn Cemetery.

Stricken with paralysis, Addison Brown died at his Manhattan home on April 9, 1913, at age 83. He was interred in a sarcophagus at Woodlawn Cemetery in The Bronx. Brown's estate was estimated at $750,000. While the bulk of his bequests were in trust for his children, Brown left $40,000 to charities, principally the bequest to the New York Botanical Garden magazine, and scholarship prizes for Harvard University and Amherst College. Smaller gifts went to organizations ranging from the Tuskegee Institute to the West Newbury Library Association.

== Notes ==
Legal offices
Preceded by William Gardner Choate	Judge of the United States District Court for the Southern District of New York; 1881–1901	Succeeded by George B. Adams
