= William R. Williams =

American politician

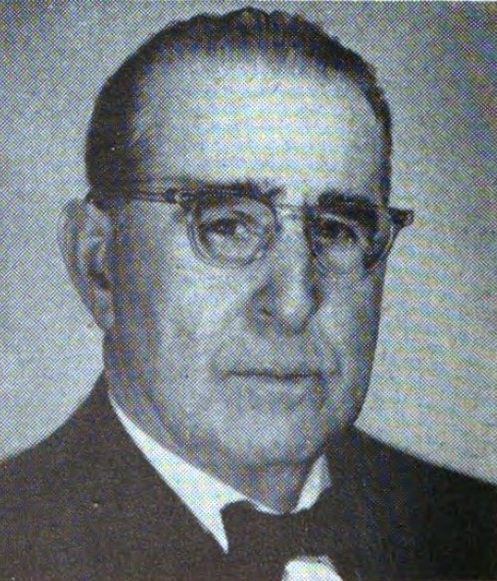

Member of the U.S. House of Representatives from New York
- In office January 3, 1951 – January 3, 1959
- Preceded by: John C. Davies II
- Succeeded by: Alexander Pirnie
- Constituency: 35th district (1951–1953); 34th district (1953–1959)

Personal details
- Born: William Robert Williams; August 11, 1884 Brookfield, New York, U.S.
- Died: May 9, 1972 (aged 87) Cassville, New York, U.S.
- Party: Republican

William Robert Williams (August 11, 1884 – May 9, 1972) was an American politician from New York.

== Life ==
He was born on August 11, 1884, in Brookfield, New York. He moved to Cassville in 1891. He was a salesman with Standard Oil from 1907 to 1910.

Williams was a member of the New York State Assembly (Oneida Co., 2nd D.) in 1936, 1937, 1938, 1939–40, 1941–42 and 1943.

He was Sheriff of Oneida County, New York from 1944 to 1951. He was elected as a Republican to the 82nd, 83rd, 84th and 85th United States Congresses, holding office from January 3, 1951, to January 3, 1959. He was chairman of the Oneida County Republican Committee from 1959 to 1961. Williams voted present on the Civil Rights Act of 1957.

He died on May 9, 1972, in Cassville, New York; and was buried at the Sauquoit Valley Cemetery in Clayville.

== Sources ==
- United States Congress. "William R. Williams (id: W000549)". Biographical Directory of the United States Congress.

New York State Assembly
Preceded by Russell G. Dunmore	New York State Assembly; Oneida County, 2nd District; 1936–1943	Succeeded by Harry G. Converse
U.S. House of Representatives
Preceded by John C. Davies	Member of the U.S. House of Representatives from New York's 35th congressional district 1951–1953	Succeeded by R. Walter Riehlman
Preceded by Clarence E. Kilburn	Member of the U.S. House of Representatives from New York's 34th congressional district 1953–1959	Succeeded by Alexander Pirnie
