= James A. Hamilton =

American politician (1876–1950)

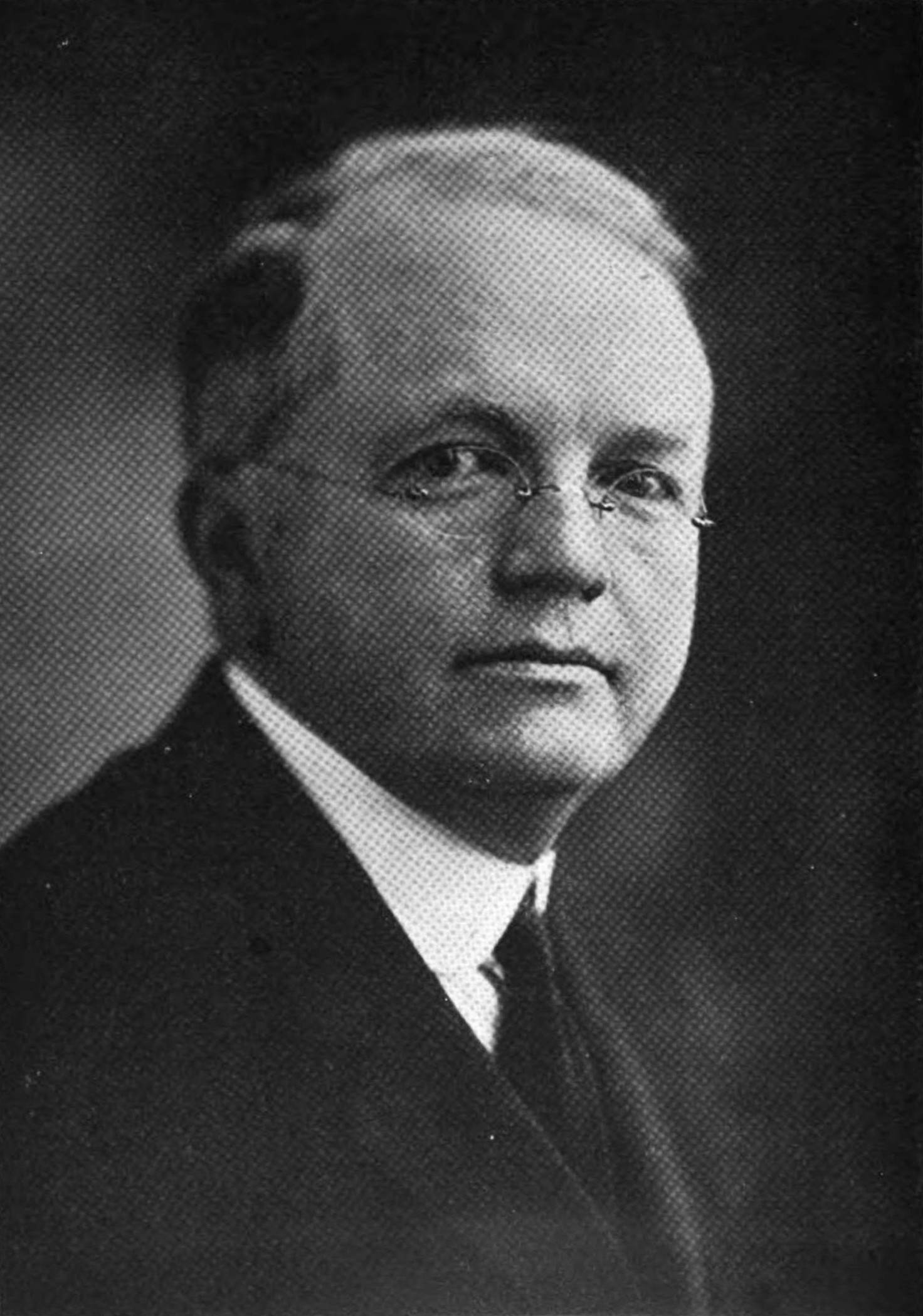
James A. Hamilton, Ph.D.

James Albert Hamilton (January 24, 1876 Manhattan, New York City – May 7, 1950 Manhattan, New York City) was an American educator and politician from New York.

== Life ==
He was the son of John Coulter Hamilton, an Irish immigrant who came to New York in 1864, and Margaret Scott (Vance) Hamilton. He attended Public School No. 32 in Manhattan and graduated from New York Evening High School in 1892. After completing college preparatory studies at the Peddie Institute in 1894, he earned a B.A. degree from the University of Rochester in 1898.

Hamilton was a school teacher in New York City from 1898 to 1914. While teaching, he took graduate courses at Columbia University and New York University in history and economics, receiving an M.A. degree from NYU in 1903. He then earned an LL.B. degree from the NYU School of Law in 1904, specializing in constitutional law.

On October 11, 1904, Hamilton married Georgiana Elizabeth Montgomery, and they had six children. He also continued his graduate studies, completing a Ph.D. degree in sociology at NYU in 1909. His doctoral thesis was entitled Negro Suffrage and Congressional Representation.

He was a member of the New York State Senate (22nd D.) from the Bronx in 1915 and 1916. He was NYC Commissioner of Correction from 1918 to 1922. He was Secretary of State of New York from 1923 to 1924, elected at the New York state election, 1922 but defeated for re-election at the New York state election, 1924. He was an alternate delegate to the 1928 Democratic National Convention. He was New York State Industrial Commissioner from 1925 to 1929.

Hamilton died at St. Elizabeth Hospital in Manhattan at the age of 74 on May 7, 1950.

== Sources ==
- The opening of free ice stations, in NYT on July 9, 1919
- His statement on the gas price, in NYT on November 1922
- NYC Correction History
- Bio transcribed from The Bronx and Its People (1927)

Party political offices
| Preceded by Harriet May Mills | Democratic nominee for Secretary of State of New York; 1922, 1924 | Succeeded by None |
New York State Senate
| Preceded by Anthony J. Griffin | New York State Senate; 22nd District; 1915–1916 | Succeeded by John V. Sheridan |
Political offices
| Preceded by John J. Lyons | New York Secretary of State; 1923–1924 | Succeeded by Florence E. S. Knapp |
