= Francis D. Culkin =

American politician (1874–1943)

Francis Dugan Culkin
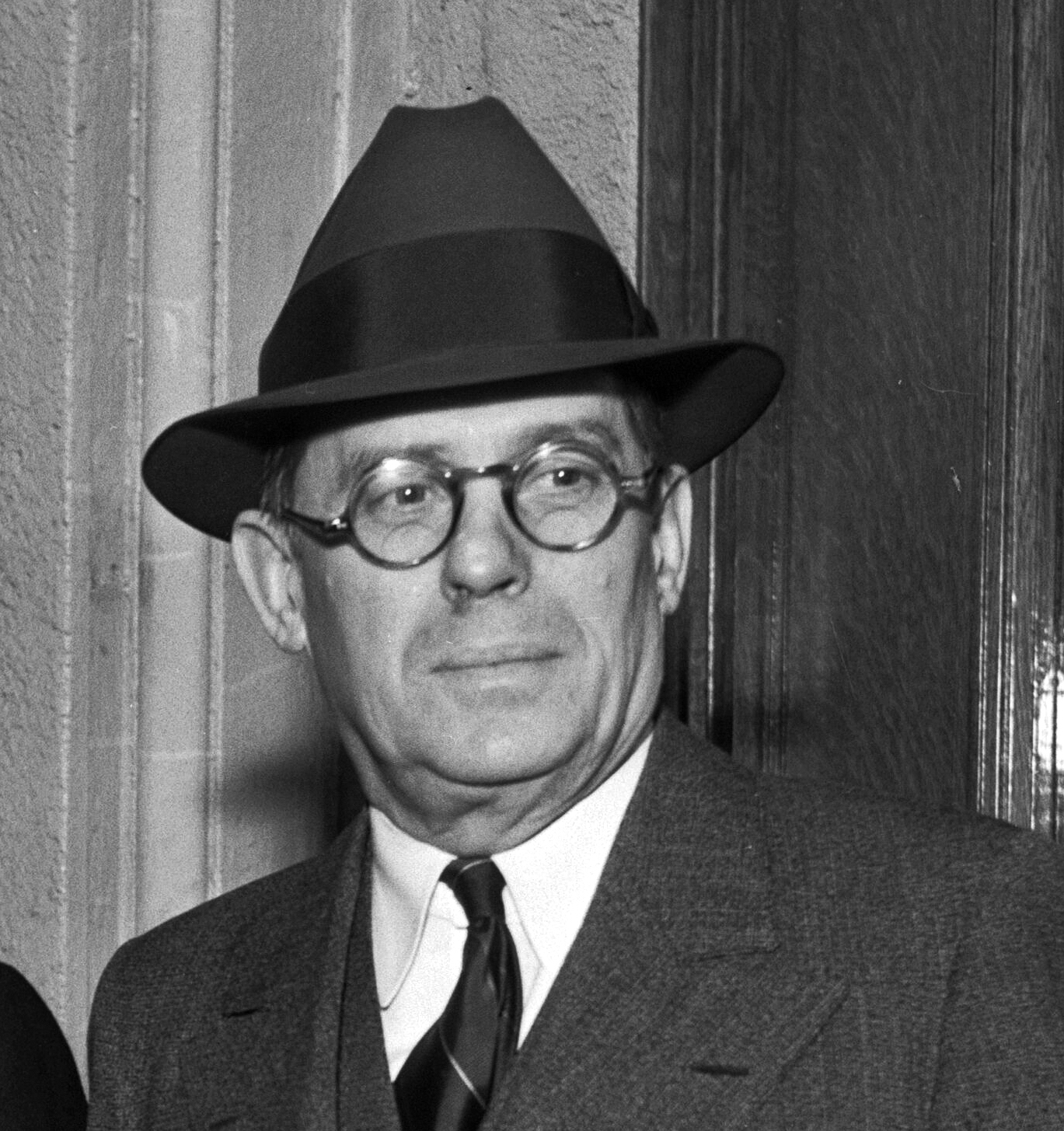

Member of the U.S. House of Representatives from New York's 32nd district
- In office November 6, 1928 – August 4, 1943
- Preceded by: Thaddeus Campbell Sweet
- Succeeded by: Hadwen Carlton Fuller

Personal details
- Born: November 10, 1874 Oswego, New York
- Died: August 4, 1943 (aged 68) Oswego, New York
- Resting place: St. Paul's Cemetery, Oswego, New York
- Party: Republican
- Spouse: Mary Louise Hosmer Culkin (1878–1970)
- Children: Francis Hosmer Culkin (1915–2008); Josephine Louise Culkin (1917–1952); Anthony Grant Culkin (1920–1923)

Military service
- Allegiance: New York
- Branch/service: National Guard of the State of New York
- Years of service: 1898–1908
- Rank: Captain
- Battles/wars: Spanish–American War

Francis Dugan Culkin (November 10, 1874 – August 4, 1943) was a Republican member of the United States House of Representatives from New York.

== Biography ==
Culkin was born in Oswego, New York on November 10, 1874, and attended school in Oswego. He attended St. Andrew's Seminary in Rochester, New York and the University of Rochester, and began a career as a newspaper reporter in Rochester.

He joined the 48th Separate Company of the New York Army National Guard as a Private and served during the Spanish–American War. He later received a commission, attained the rank of Captain, and commanded the company until 1908. Culkin was also active in the United Spanish War Veterans.

Culkin studied law, passed the bar, and began a practice in 1902 while also serving as Secretary of the Oswego Civil Service Commission. A Republican, he was City Attorney of Oswego from 1906 to 1910, and Oswego County District Attorney from 1911 until 1921. In 1921 he became a Judge on the Oswego County Court, where he served until his election to Congress. Culkin was elected in 1928 to fill the vacancy caused by the death of Thaddeus Campbell Sweet and served from November 6, 1928, until his death in Oswego, New York on August 4, 1943.

Culkin died as the result of histoplasmosis, a rare tropical disease he was believed to have contracted while on a trip to South America in 1938. He was buried at St. Paul's Cemetery in Oswego.

== Legacy ==
A World War II Liberty ship was named for Culkin.

Culkin Hall at the State University of New York at Oswego was named for him.

Culkin's Oswego law firm is still in operation as Amdursky, Pelky, Fennell & Wallen P.C.

== See also ==
- List of members of the United States Congress who died in office (1900–1949)

== External sources ==
- United States Congress. "Francis D. Culkin (id: C000968)". Biographical Directory of the United States Congress.

U.S. House of Representatives
Preceded by Thaddeus C. Sweet	Member of the U.S. House of Representatives from New York's 32nd congressional district November 6, 1928 – August 4, 1943	Succeeded by Hadwen C. Fuller
