= Theodore E. Hancock =

American lawyer

Theodore E. Hancock LL.D.
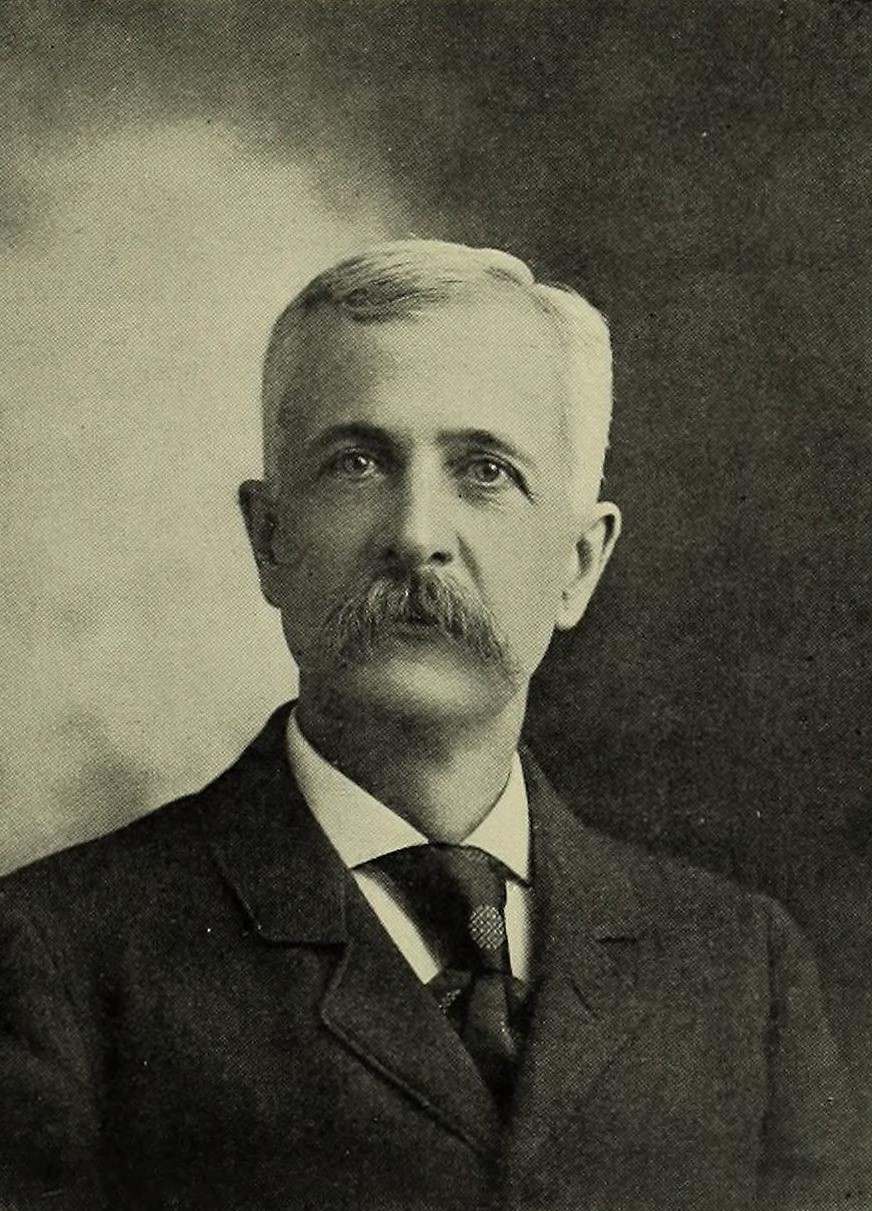
- Born: May 30, 1847; Granby, New York, U.S.
- Died: November 19, 1916 (aged 69); Syracuse, New York, U.S.
- Education: Wesleyan University (1871); Columbia University Law School
- Occupations: Lawyer; politician
- Spouse: Martha B. Connelly (m. 1882)
- Children: 3, including Clarence E. Hancock
- Relatives: Stewart F. Hancock Jr. (grandson)

Attorney General of New York
- In office January 1, 1894 – December 31, 1898
- Preceded by: Simon W. Rosendale
- Succeeded by: John C. Davies

22nd District Attorney of Onondaga County, New York
- In office November 5, 1889 – November 8, 1892
- Preceded by: Lawrence T. Jones
- Succeeded by: Benjamin J. Shove

Theodore E. Hancock (May 30, 1847 – November 19, 1916) was an American lawyer and politician. He was New York's Attorney General from 1894 to 1898.

== Biography ==
He was born on May 30, 1847, in Granby, New York, to Freeman Hancock and Mary Williams.

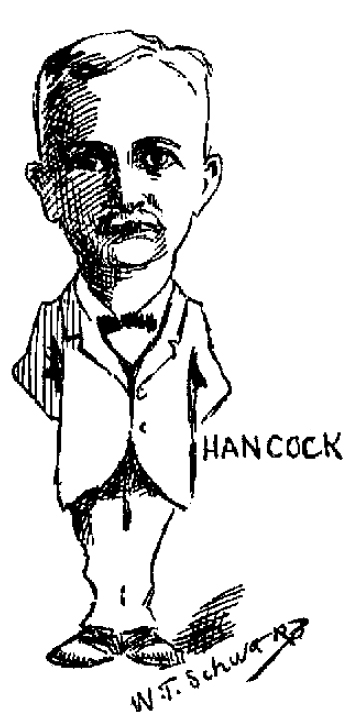
Caricature of Theodore E. Hancock by W. T. Schwarz of Syracuse, New York, in February, 1906

He graduated from Falley Seminary in Fulton in 1867, and from Wesleyan University in 1871. He then studied law at the Columbia University Law School, and graduated with a Bachelor of Laws. He was admitted to the bar in 1873.

In 1873, he commenced practice in New York City in the office of Bangs & North. A few years later, he removed to Syracuse, New York, and opened the office of Gilbert & Hancock.

In 1879, he established the firm of Hancock, Beach, Peck and Devine in Syracuse. His son Stewart F. Hancock was considered the "modern-day founder of the firm", and his grandson Stewart F. Hancock Jr. rejoined the firm in 1994 after serving on the New York Court of Appeals.

He was a Justice of the Peace; and was District Attorney of Onondaga County from 1889 to 1892. He was New York Attorney General from 1894 to 1898, elected at the New York state election, 1893, and re-elected at the New York state election, 1895 on the Republican ticket. In 1897, Wesleyan University conferred on him the honorary degree of Doctor of Laws (LL.D.). In 1899, he ran for Mayor of Syracuse, New York.

He died on November 19, 1916, in Syracuse, New York.

== Personal life ==
He was married on June 7, 1882, to Martha B. Connelly of Wheeling, West Virginia, and had three children:

- Stewart F. Hancock (born April 4, 1883) - Graduated from Wesleyan University in 1905 and Syracuse University Law School in 1907. He was admitted to the bar in 1907 and practiced law as a member of the firm of Hancock, Hogan & Hancock.
- Clarence Eugene Hancock (born February 13, 1885) - Graduated from Wesleyan University in 1906 and New York Law School in 1908. Admitted to the bar in 1908 and a member of the firm Hancock, Spriggs and Hancock. United States Congressman for New York's 35th District, 1927-1945. Syracuse Hancock International Airport is named after him
- Martha Hancock - Educated at Syracuse University and Wesleyan College.

Legal offices
Preceded by Simon W. Rosendale	New York Attorney General; 1894–1898	Succeeded by John C. Davies
