= James S. Havens =

American politician (1859–1927)

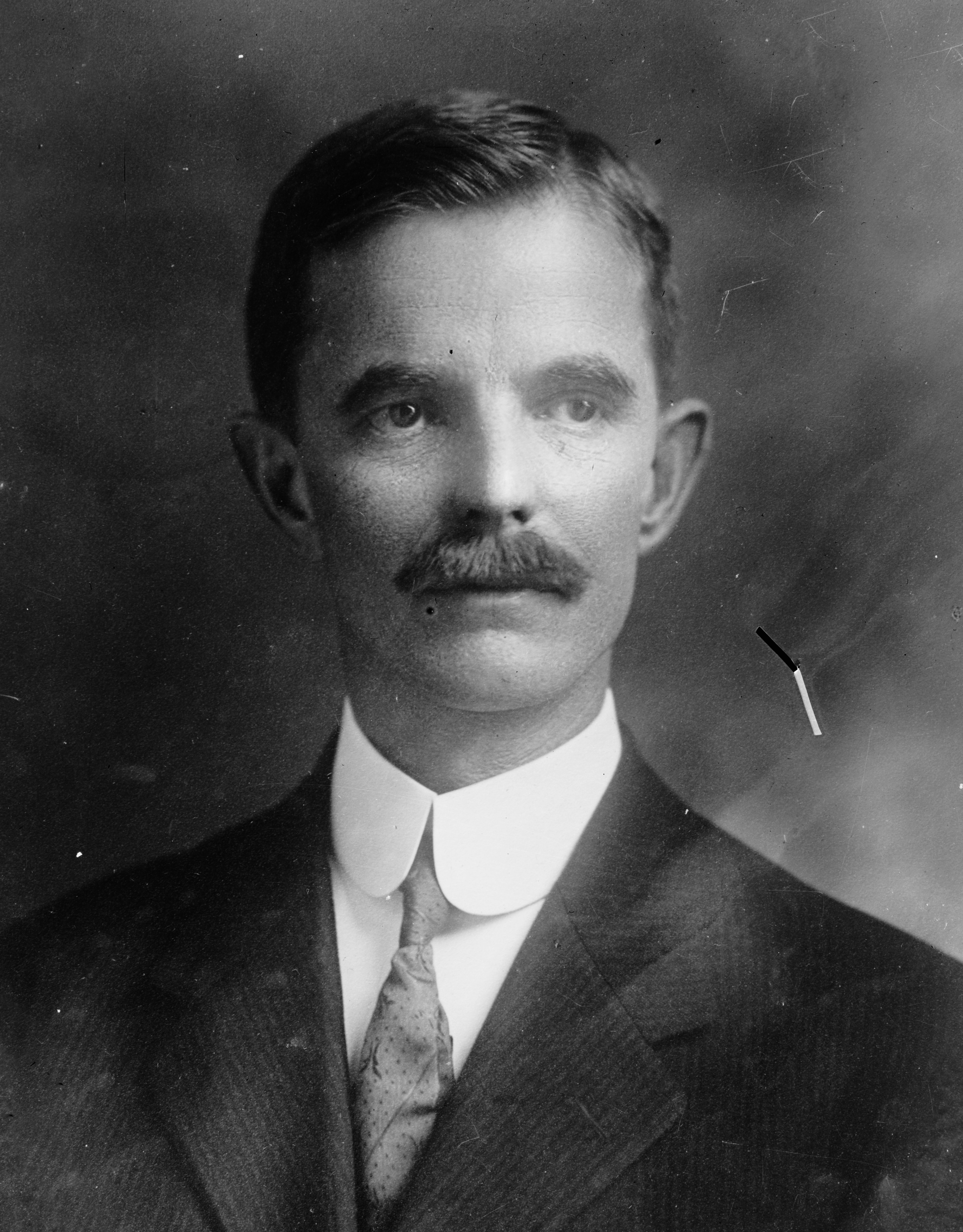
- Havens, c. 1910

Member of the U.S. House of Representatives from New York's 32nd district
- In office April 19, 1910 – March 3, 1911
- Preceded by: James B. Perkins
- Succeeded by: Henry G. Danforth

Personal details
- Born: James Smith Havens; May 28, 1859 Weedsport, New York, U.S.
- Died: February 27, 1927 (aged 67)
- Party: Democratic
- Children: James D. Havens
- Education: Yale University

James Smith Havens (May 28, 1859 – February 27, 1927) was an American lawyer and politician who served part of one term as a U.S. representative from New York from April 1910 to March 1911, having been elected to fill a mid-term vacancy.

== Biography ==
Born in Weedsport, New York. He attended the public schools and Munro Collegiate Institute, Elbridge, New York and graduated from Yale College in 1884. He moved to Rochester the same year and studied law. He was admitted to the bar in 1887 and commenced practice in Rochester.

=== Family ===
He was the father of noted artist James D. Havens. He learned of research being done by Banting and Best in Canada, and his son Jim became the first American to use insulin.

=== Political career ===
He was a delegate to the Democratic National Convention in 1904. He was elected as a Democrat to the Sixty-first Congress to fill the vacancy caused by the death of James B. Perkins (April 19, 1910 – March 3, 1911). He was not a candidate for renomination in 1910.

=== Later career and death ===
Havens resumed the practice of his profession in Rochester.

He declined the Democratic nomination for mayor of Rochester in 1913. He was vice president and secretary of the Eastman Kodak Company, and head of its legal department from 1919 until his death and interment in Mount Hope Cemetery in 1927.

U.S. House of Representatives
Preceded by James B. Perkins	Member of the U.S. House of Representatives from New York's 32nd congressional district 1910-04-19–1911-03-03	Succeeded by Henry G. Danforth
