= Hadwen C. Fuller =

American politician

Hadwen Carlton Fuller
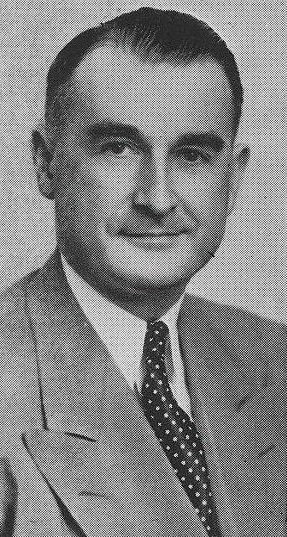
- Hadwen C. Fuller, U.S. Representative from New York.

Member of the U.S. House of Representatives from New York
- In office November 2, 1943 – January 3, 1949
- Preceded by: Francis Dugan Culkin
- Succeeded by: John C. Davies II
- Constituency: 32nd district (1943–45); 35th district (1945–49)

Personal details
- Born: August 28, 1895 West Monroe, New York, U.S.
- Died: January 29, 1990 (aged 94) Parish, New York, U.S.
- Party: Republican

Hadwen Carlton Fuller (August 28, 1895 – January 29, 1990) was a United States representative from New York.

== Biography ==
He was born on August 28, 1895, in West Monroe, Oswego County, New York. He attended the public schools and Central Square High School. He worked as a bank clerk, and was assistant cashier of the First National Bank of Central Square from 1912 to 1918. During the First World War he served in the United States Army; in 1919 he organized the State Bank of Parish and served as a director. He was organizer of the Parish Oil Co. Inc. in 1926, serving as president since 1937, and was Chairman of the Oswego County Republican Committee in 1942.

Fuller was a member of the New York State Assembly (Oswego Co.) in 1943. He was elected as a Republican to the 78th United States Congress, to fill the vacancy caused by the death of Francis D. Culkin. He was re-elected to the 79th and 80th United States Congresses, holding office from November 2, 1943, to January 3, 1949. He was a delegate to the 1948 Republican National Convention. Afterwards he resumed his former business pursuits.

He died on January 29, 1990, in Parish, New York.

New York State Assembly
Preceded by Ernest J. Lonis	New York State Assembly; Oswego County; 1943	Succeeded by Henry D. Coville
U.S. House of Representatives
Preceded by Francis D. Culkin	Member of the U.S. House of Representatives from New York's 32nd congressional district 1943–1945	Succeeded by William T. Byrne
Preceded by Clarence E. Hancock	Member of the U.S. House of Representatives from New York's 35th congressional district 1945–1949	Succeeded by John C. Davies
