= Carl Sherman =

American politician

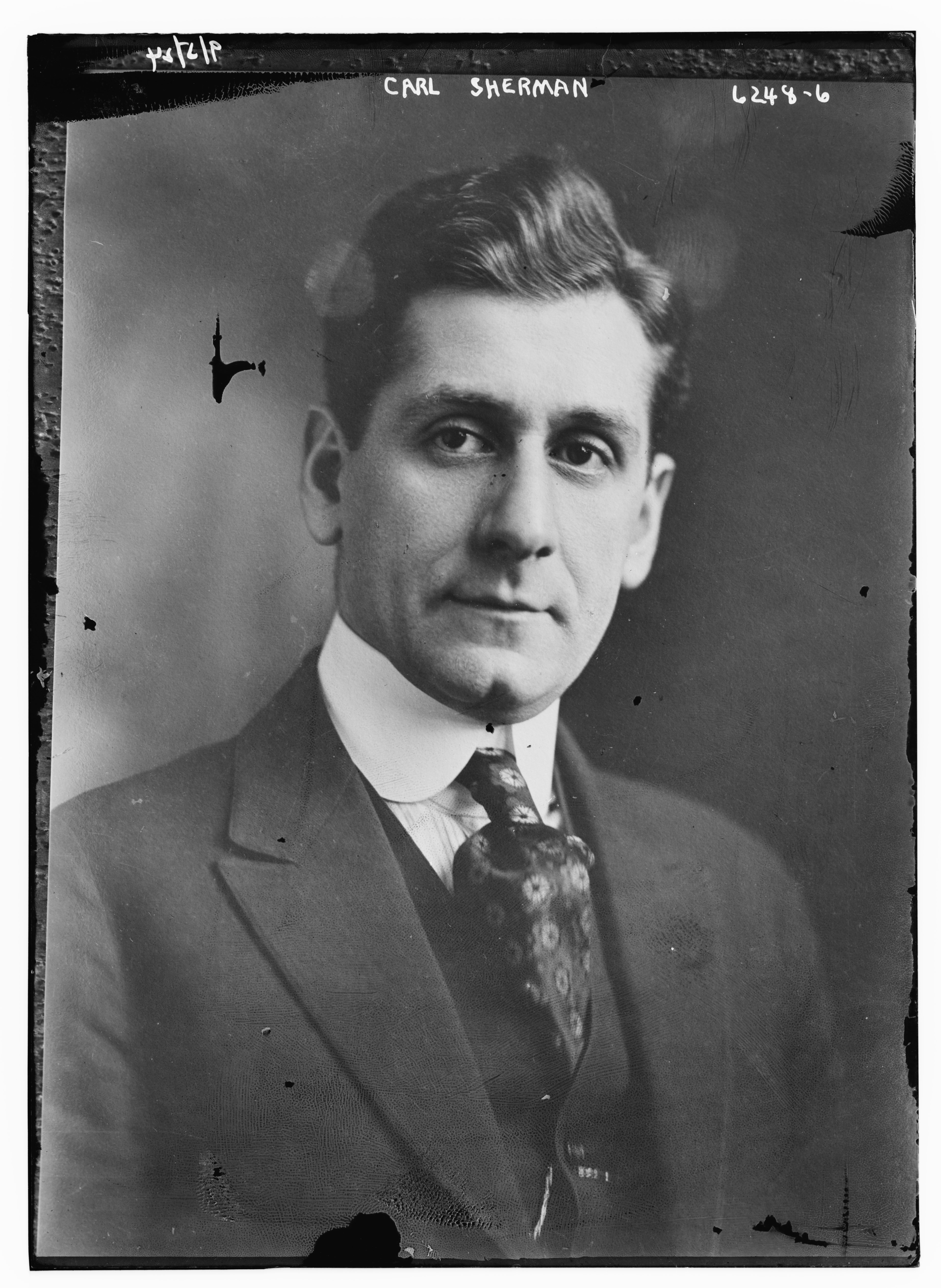
Sherman in 1924

Carl Sherman (October 16, 1890 – July 17, 1956) was an American lawyer and politician.

== Life ==
Sherman was born in Olmütz, Austria, which is now Olomouc in the Czech Republic. His parents, Sandor and Pauline (Opler) Sherman, brought the family to the United States in 1894, and Sandor Sherman worked as a tobacco merchant in Buffalo. Carl Sherman graduated from Buffalo's Masten Park High School in 1908, and received his LL.B. degree from the University at Buffalo Law School in 1910. Sherman lived and practiced law in Buffalo.

He was an Assistant United States Attorney in the Western District of New York appointed by President Woodrow Wilson. He was New York State Attorney General from 1923 to 1924, elected in 1922 but defeated for re-election in 1924.

He was a delegate to the 1924 and 1956 Democratic National Conventions, and an alternate delegate to the 1948 Democratic National Convention. He was Treasurer of the New York State Democratic Committee from 1945 to 1950.

He was a Vice President of the American Jewish Congress.

He died during a vacation in Larchmont, and was buried at the Cedar Park Cemetery in Paramus, New Jersey.

== See also ==
- List of Jewish American jurists

== Sources ==
- Political Graveyard
- Directory of Jewish organizations, at AJC archives
- List of New York Attorneys General, at Office of the NYSAG
- His praise by Judge Hazel, in NYT on November 3, 1922

Party political offices
Preceded by Frank H. Mott	Democratic nominee for Attorney General of New York; 1922, 1924	Succeeded by Benjamin Stolz
Legal offices
Preceded by Charles D. Newton	New York State Attorney General; 1923–1924	Succeeded by Albert Ottinger
