= James D. Havens =

American artist (1900–1960)

James D. Havens holding one of his children. University of Toronto Libraries.

James Dexter Havens (1900–1960) was a printmaker and painter in Rochester, New York, who is considered part of the color woodblock revival in America. He has works in the collections of the Library of Congress, the Metropolitan Museum, the Albright-Knox Art Gallery, the Memorial Art Gallery of the University of Rochester, and Strong National Museum of Play. A founding member of the Print Club of Rochester, Havens designed its logo which is still in use.

Havens was the son of James S. Havens, a former congressman and legal counsel at George Eastman's Kodak. Artistic as a child, young Jim was stricken with childhood diabetes (diabetes mellitus) at age fourteen. Though ill, he still managed to complete high school and three years at the University of Rochester. At the age of twenty-two, on the verge of death, he became the first person in the United States to receive the new drug insulin. Insulin therapy dramatically improved the quality of his life and he finished studying art at the Rochester Athenaeum and Mechanics Institute (later Rochester Institute of Technology).

Havens continued to study printmaking, first with Troy Kinney, and later at the famous Woodbury school in Ogunquit, Maine. His works are typically landscape and nature scenes characterized by minute detail and careful design. One author claimed he "strove to depict the dynamic, yet often unseen, processes of nature." In 1951 he was elected into the National Academy of Design as an Associate Academician.

Havens died at the age of 60, from cancer. Among his most staunch admirers was Elliott P. Joslin, who came to be one of the United States's greatest authorities on diabetes.
