= Thomas Carmody (New York politician) =

American lawyer and politician

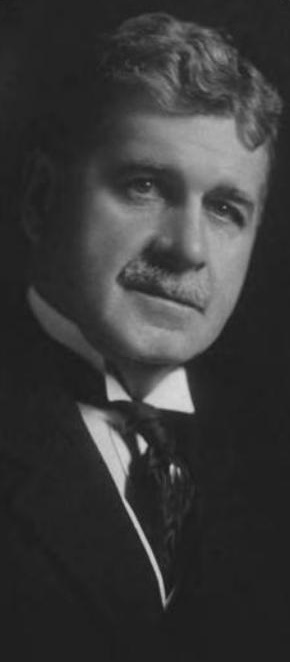
Carmody from 1914's New York State Men

Thomas Carmody (October 9, 1859 in Milo, Yates County, New York – January 22, 1922 in New Rochelle, Westchester County, New York) was an American lawyer and politician.

== Life ==
He graduated from Cornell Law School, and was admitted to the bar in 1886. He was District Attorney of Yates County from 1889 to 1893, and Chief Examiner of the State Civil Service Commission from 1893 to 1896. He was a delegate to the 1904 and 1912 Democratic National Conventions.

He was New York Attorney General from 1911 to 1914, elected in 1910 and 1912. In 1913, he got involved in a controversy with zoo director William Temple Hornaday over the Federal Migratory Bird law which in Carmody's opinion was unconstitutional. On July 20, 1914, he announced his and First Deputy Attorney General Joseph A. Kellogg's resignation to take effect on September 1, and their intention to open a law firm with State Senator George A. Blauvelt at 61 Broadway in New York City.

He caught a cold while trying a case at White Plains, New York and died four days later of pneumonia at his home at 95 Locust Avenue in New Rochelle.

== Sources ==
- The Political Graveyard: Index to Politicians: Carmicle to Carnevale at politicalgraveyard.com Political Graveyard
- The bird law controversy, in NYT on December 22, 1913
- The announcement of resignation, in NYT on July 21, 1914
- Obit notice in NYT on January 23, 1922

Party political offices
Preceded by George M. Palmer	Democratic nominee for Attorney General of New York; 1910, 1912	Succeeded by James A. Parsons
Legal offices
Preceded by Edward R. O'Malley	New York State Attorney General; 1911–1914	Succeeded by James A. Parsons
