= Stewart F. Hancock Jr. =

American judge (1923–2014)

Stewart Freeman Hancock Jr. (February 2, 1923 – February 11, 2014) was a judge of the New York Court of Appeals, the highest court in the state of New York, from 1986 to 1993.

The grandson of Theodore E. Hancock, Hancock Jr. received a B.S. degree in 1945 from the United States Naval Academy and was an active duty member of the United States Navy for three-and-a-half years. He received an LL.B. from Cornell Law School in 1950.

On January 8, 1986, Governor Mario Cuomo appointed Hancock to a seat on the Court of Appeals vacated by Judge Matthew Jasen; Hancock was one of three Republican judges appointed to the court by Cuomo, a Democrat. In 1994, after completing his service on the Court, Hancock rejoined the firm founded by his grandfather.

Hancock died in 2014.

Political offices
Preceded by Mathew J. Jasen	Judge of the New York Court of Appeals; 1986–1993	Succeeded by Howard A. Levine
