= Egburt E. Woodbury =

American politician

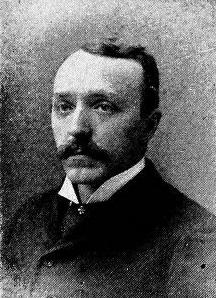
Woodbury c. 1893

Egburt E. Woodbury (March 29, 1861 – March 13, 1920) was an American lawyer and politician.

== Life ==
He was born on March 29, 1861, in Cherry Creek, Chautauqua County, New York. He attended the common schools, and Chamberlain Institute in Randolph. Then he studied law, was admitted to the bar in 1884, and practiced in Jamestown.

He was elected a Justice of the Peace in 1886. He was a member of the New York State Assembly in 1891, 1892 (both Chautauqua Co., 2nd D.) and 1893 (Chautauqua Co.); Surrogate of Chautauqua County from 1901 to 1905; and a State Tax Commissioner from 1906 on.

He was New York Attorney General from 1915 to 1917, elected at the New York state election, 1914, and re-elected at the New York state election, 1916. He resigned on April 19, 1917, due to ill health, and was succeeded by his First Deputy Attorney General Merton E. Lewis.

He died on March 13, 1920, in Jamestown, New York.

== Sources ==
- New York State Legislative Souvenir by Henry K. Phelps (1893; pg. 65)
- His appointment as tax commissioner, in NYT on January 2, 1906
- His appointments for deputies, in NYT on December 19, 1914
- His resignation, in NYT on April 20, 1917
- Merton Lewis declined renomination, in NYT on May 7, 1918
- Obit notice in NYT on March 14, 1920

Party political offices
Preceded by Meier Steinbrink	Republican nominee for Attorney General of New York; 1914, 1916	Succeeded by Merton E. Lewis
New York State Assembly
Preceded by S. Frederick Nixon	New York State Assembly; Chautauqua County; 1891–1893	Succeeded by S. Frederick Nixon
Legal offices
Preceded by James A. Parsons	New York State Attorney General; 1915–1917	Succeeded by Merton E. Lewis
