= John J. Lyons =

American politician

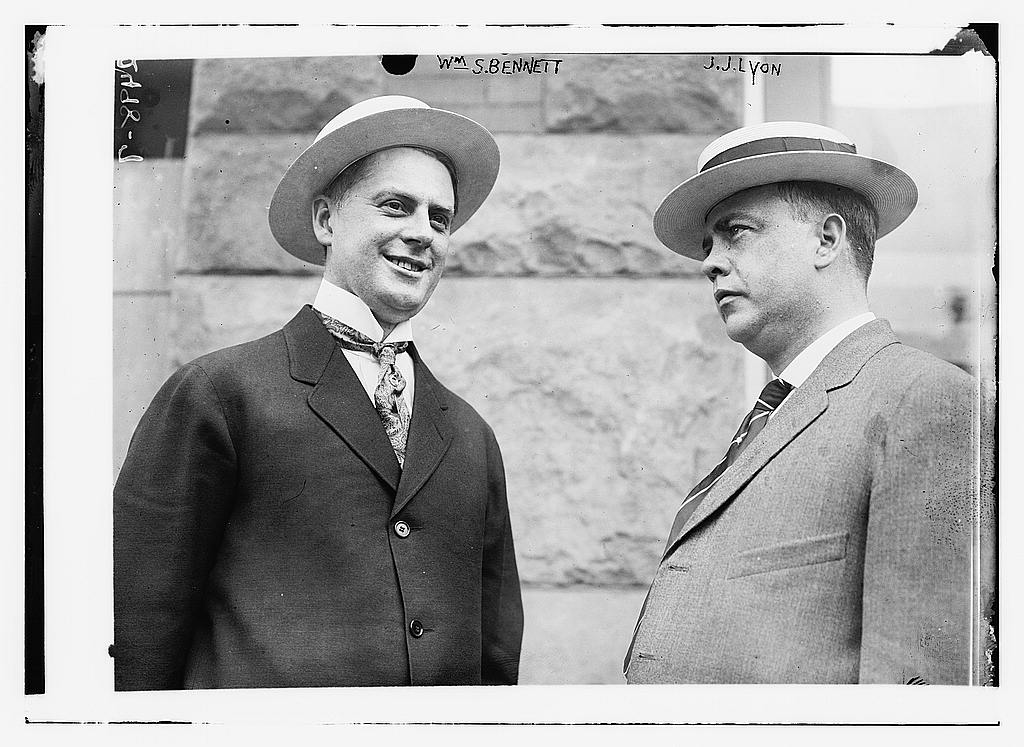
William Stiles Bennet and John J. Lyons c. 1912–1913

John J. Lyons (c. 1881 – February 27, 1945) was the Secretary of State of New York.

== Biography ==
He was the Republican district leader in Harlem. He was an alternate delegate to the 1916 Republican National Convention, and a delegate to the 1920 Republican National Convention. He was Secretary of State of New York from 1921 to 1922, elected in 1920. He died at the United States Veterans Hospital in the Bronx.

Party political offices
Preceded by Francis Hugo	Republican nominee for Secretary of State of New York; 1920	Succeeded by Samuel J. Joseph
Political offices
Preceded by Francis Hugo	New York Secretary of State; 1921–1922	Succeeded by James A. Hamilton
