= Edward F. Cassidy =

American socialist politician

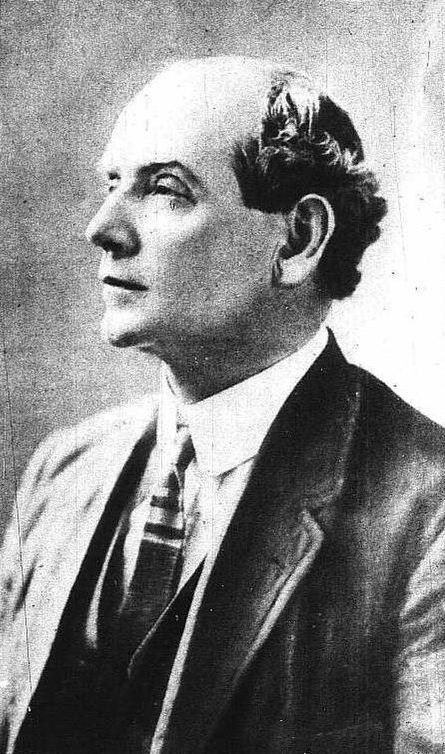
- Cassidy c. 1923

Member of the New York City Board of Aldermen from the 20th district
- In office November 3, 1921 – December 31, 1921

Personal details
- Born: 1868 New York City, U.S.
- Died: November 19, 1937 (aged 69) New York City, U.S.
- Party: Socialist
- Occupation: Politician, labor leader

Edward F. Cassidy (1868 – November 19, 1937) was an Irish-American printer, labor leader and politician who briefly served as a Socialist member of the New York City Board of Aldermen, representing Manhattan's 20th district from November to December 1921. He had first been elected in 1919, but was denied his seat alongside Algernon Lee due to a miscount that was not resolved until their terms were nearly over.

Cassidy was a frequent candidate for office on the Socialist Party ticket, running no less than two dozen times over the course of his career. Outside of electoral politics, he was active in the local typographical union, serving as its vice president. He died at the New York Hospital on November 19, 1937.
