= John Cunneen =

American lawyer and politician

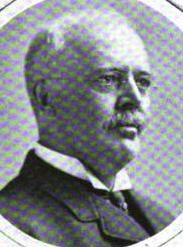
- Cunneen in 1903

Attorney General of New York
- In office 1903–1904

Personal details
- Born: May 18, 1848 near Ennis, Ireland
- Died: February 21, 1907 (aged 58) Buffalo, New York, U.S.
- Occupation: Lawyer and politician

John Cunneen (May 18, 1848 near Ennis, Ireland – February 21, 1907 Buffalo, New York, United States) was an American lawyer and politician.

== Life ==
He came to the United States when 14 years old to live with relatives at Albion, New York. He graduated from Albion Academy in 1870, and began the study of law at the office of John H. White at Albion. He was admitted to the bar in 1874, and commenced practice in Albion. He was a member of the Board of Education of the Village of Albion, and for seven years was Clerk to the Board of Supervisors of Orleans County. On January 26, 1876, he married Elizabeth A. Bass.

In 1890, he moved to Buffalo and formed a partnership with William F. Sheehan and Charles F. Tabor in the firm of Sheehan, Tabor, Cunneen & Coatsworth. In 1894, he became the senior member of Cunneen & Coatsworth. He was a delegate to the 1892 Democratic National Convention. At the New York state election, 1902, he was elected New York Attorney General on the Democratic and Prohibition tickets. He ran for re-election at the New York state election, 1904, but was defeated.

He died of pneumonia, and was buried at St. Joseph's Cemetery in Albion, like his brother Cornelius Cunneen (1868–1890) who had drowned in the Erie Canal. His wife Elizabeth, who died in 1917, was Protestant and so could not be buried with him.

== Sources ==
- Obit in NYT on February 22, 1907
- Bio transcribed from Our County and Its People: A Descriptive Work on Erie County, New York edited by Truman C. White (The Boston History Company, 1898)
- His brothers death notice transcribed from The Medina Tribune on October 9, 1890
- Burials at St. Joseph's Cemetery, at RootsWeb

Legal offices
Preceded by John C. Davies	New York Attorney General; 1903–1904	Succeeded by Julius M. Mayer
