= Julius Marshuetz Mayer =

American judge (1865–1925)

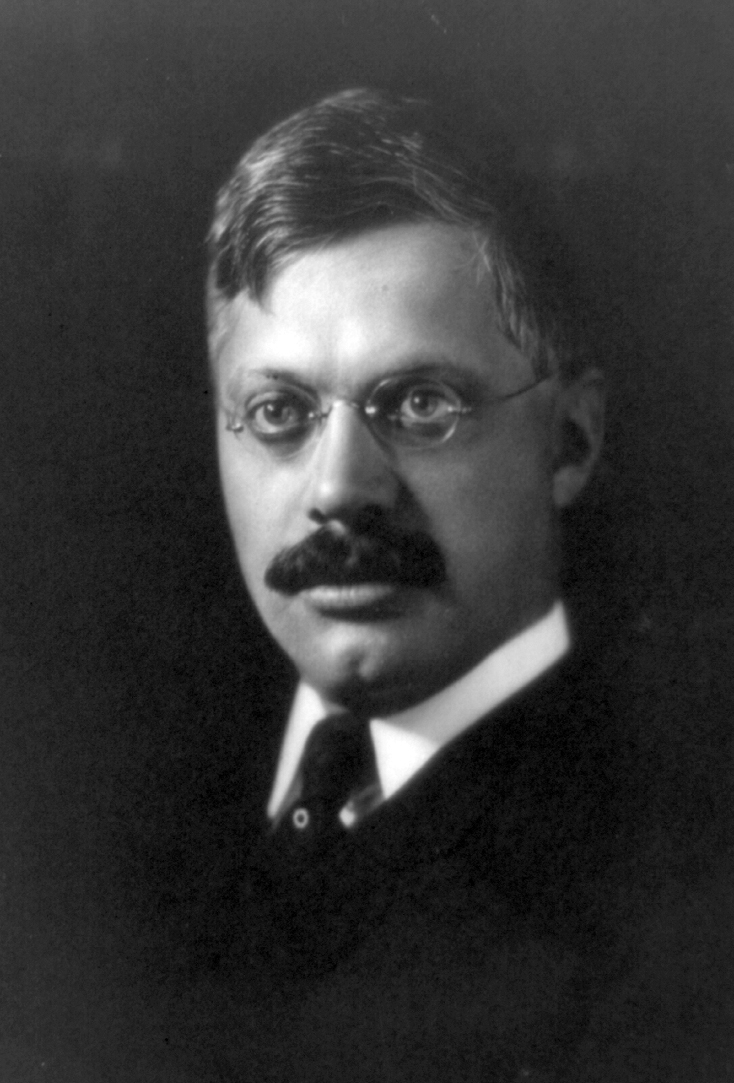
- Mayer in 1904

Judge of the United States Court of Appeals for the Second Circuit
- In office October 5, 1921 – July 31, 1924
- Appointed by: Warren G. Harding
- Preceded by: Henry Galbraith Ward
- Succeeded by: Learned Hand

Judge of the United States District Court for the Southern District of New York
- In office February 26, 1912 – October 13, 1921
- Appointed by: William Howard Taft
- Preceded by: George B. Adams
- Succeeded by: William Bondy

Personal details
- Born: Julius Marshuetz Mayer; September 5, 1865 New York City, U.S.
- Died: November 20, 1925 (aged 60) New York City, U.S.
- Education: City College of New York (AB); Columbia Law School (LLB)

Julius Marshuetz Mayer (September 5, 1865 – November 20, 1925) was a United States circuit judge of the United States Court of Appeals for the Second Circuit and previously was a United States District Judge of the United States District Court for the Southern District of New York.

== Education and career ==
Born on September 5, 1865, in New York City, New York, Mayer received an Artium Baccalaureus degree in 1884 from the City College of New York and a Bachelor of Laws in 1886 from Columbia Law. He entered private practice in New York City from 1886 to 1912. He was counsel for the New York State Excise Board from 1895 to 1896. He was counsel for the New York City Building Department from 1897 to 1898. He was a Justice of the New York Court of Special Sessions from 1902 to 1903. He was Attorney General of New York from 1903 to 1907.

== Federal judicial service ==
Mayer was nominated by President William Howard Taft on February 19, 1912, to a seat on the United States District Court for the Southern District of New York vacated by Judge George B. Adams. He was confirmed by the United States Senate on February 26, 1912, and received his commission the same day. His service terminated on October 13, 1921, due to his elevation to the Second Circuit.

Mayer was nominated by President Warren G. Harding on September 22, 1921, to a seat on the United States Court of Appeals for the Second Circuit vacated by Judge Henry Galbraith Ward. He was confirmed by the Senate on October 5, 1921, and received his commission the same day. His service terminated on July 31, 1924, due to his resignation.

== Later career and death ==
After his resignation from the federal bench, Mayer resumed private practice in New York City from 1924 to 1925. He died on November 20, 1925, in New York City.

== See also ==
- List of Jewish American jurists

== Sources ==
- "The Political Graveyard: Index to Politicians: Maya to Maynadier". politicalgraveyard.com.
- "Complete List of NYS Attorneys General". 21 May 2006. Archived from the original on 21 May 2006.
- "Deuel Succeeds Mayer" (PDF). The New York Times. December 15, 1903.
- "The Republican Nominees" (PDF). The New York Times. September 16, 1904.

Legal offices
Preceded by John Cunneen	Attorney General of New York; 1905–1906	Succeeded by William S. Jackson
Preceded by George B. Adams	Judge of the United States District Court for the Southern District of New York; 1912–1921	Succeeded by William Bondy
Preceded by Henry Galbraith Ward	Judge of the United States Court of Appeals for the Second Circuit; 1921–1924	Succeeded by Learned Hand
