= Attorney General of New York =

Chief legal officer of New York State

Attorney general of New York
- Seal of the attorney general of New York

- Flag of New York

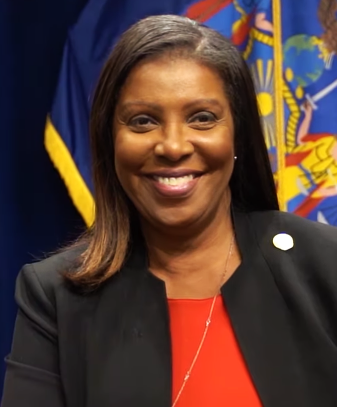
- Incumbent; Letitia James since January 1, 2019
- Department of Law
- Style: The Honorable
- Appointer: Popular vote
- Term length: Four years No limit
- Constituting instrument: New York Constitution, Executive Law
- Formation: 1777
- First holder: Egbert Benson
- Succession: Fourth
- Salary: $210,000 (2019)
- Website: ag.ny.gov

The attorney general of New York, also known as the New York attorney general (NYAG), is the chief legal officer of the U.S. state of New York and head of the Department of Law of the state government. The office has existed in various forms since 1626, originally established under the Dutch colonial government of New Netherland.

Democrat Letitia James currently serves as attorney general, in office since January 1, 2019.

== Functions ==
The attorney general advises the executive branch of state government as well as defends actions and brings proceedings on its behalf. The attorney general acts independently of the governor of New York. The department's regulations are compiled in title 13 of the New York Codes, Rules and Regulations (NYCRR).

== Organization ==
The legal functions of the Department of Law are divided primarily into five major divisions: Appeals and Opinions, State Counsel, Criminal Justice, Economic Justice and Social Justice.

=== Chief deputy attorney general ===
- Harlan Levy (2011–2015)

=== Solicitors General ===
- Ruth Kessler Toch (1966–1979)
- Shirley Adelson Siegel (1979–1982)
- Robert Hermann (1983–1986)
- O. Peter Sherwood (1986–1991)
- Jerry Boone (1991–1994)
- Victoria A. Graffeo (1995–1996)
- Barbara Gott Billet (1996–1998)
- Preeta D. Bansal (1999–2001)
- Caitlin Halligan (2001–2007)
- Barbara D. Underwood (2007–present)

== Terms of office ==
- From 1684 to 1777, when New York was under the British colonial government, the attorney general was appointed by the British crown, or the colonial governor on its behalf. In 1693, the attorney general earned a salary of 50 pounds.
- From 1777 to 1822, the attorney general was appointed by the Council of Appointment.
- From 1823 to 1846, the attorney general was elected by the New York State Legislature for a three-year term.
- Attorneys general have been elected by the voters since 1847.

== List of attorneys general of New York ==
=== Province of New York (1684–1776) ===
Image	Attorney general	Tenure		Notes
Image	Attorney general	Took office	Left office	Notes
	Thomas Rudyard	1684	December 1685	Appointed by Gov. Thomas Dongan
	James Graham	10 December 1685	1688	Afterwards attorney general of Dominion of New England, 1688.
	Member of Dominion of New England, May 1668 – April 1689			
	Jacob Milborne	1690	1691	Hanged for treason, 1691
	Thomas Newton	1691	April 1691	Removed from office by governor
	George Farewell	1691	1692	(Acting) Removed from office by governor
	James Graham	June 1692	21 January 1701	Died 27 January 1701
	Sampson Shelton Broughton	5 April 1701		Died February 1705
	John Rayner	12 July 1708		Absent in England. Died 1719.
	May Bickley	1708	1712	Acting AG in Rayner's absence. Removed from office by governor, 1712
	David Jamison	10 June 1712	1721	Acting AG in Rayner's absence, 1712–20
	James Alexander	1721	1723	
	Richard Bradley	1723	28 August 1752	
	William Smith the elder	August 1752		
	William Kempe	November 1752	19 July 1759	
	John Tabor Kempe	1759	c. 1783	
	James Duane	1767		Acting AG in Kempe's absence.

=== New York State (1777–present) ===
Image	Attorney general	Tenure	Party	Notes
	Egbert Benson	May 8, 1777 – May 14, 1788		
	Richard Varick	May 14, 1788 – September 29, 1789	Federalist	
	Aaron Burr	September 29, 1789 – November 8, 1791	Dem.-Rep.	Third vice president of the United States
	Morgan Lewis	November 8, 1791 – December 24, 1792	Dem.-Rep.	
	Nathaniel Lawrence	December 24, 1792 – November 13, 1795	Dem.-Rep.	
	Josiah Ogden Hoffman	November 13, 1795 – February 3, 1802	Federalist	
	Ambrose Spencer	February 3, 1802 – February 3, 1804	Dem.-Rep.	
	John Woodworth	February 3, 1804 – March 18, 1808	Dem.-Rep.	
	Matthias B. Hildreth	March 18, 1808 – February 2, 1810	Dem.-Rep.	
	Abraham Van Vechten	February 2, 1810 – February 1, 1811	Federalist	
	Matthias B. Hildreth	February 1, 1811 – July 11, 1812	Dem.-Rep.	Died in office
	Thomas Addis Emmet	August 12, 1812 – February 13, 1813	Dem.-Rep.	
	Abraham Van Vechten	February 13, 1813 – February 17, 1815	Federalist	
	Martin Van Buren	February 17, 1815 – July 8, 1819	Dem.-Rep.	Eighth president of the United States
	Thomas Jackson Oakley	July 8, 1819 – February 12, 1821	Federalist	
	Samuel A. Talcott	February 12, 1821 – January 27, 1829	Dem.-Rep.	First appointed, in 1823 elected by State Legislature, resigned shortly before the end of his second term
	Greene C. Bronson	January 27, 1829 – January 12, 1836	Democratic	Elected a justice of the State Supreme Court during his third term
	Samuel Beardsley	January 12, 1836 – February 4, 1839	Democratic	
	Willis Hall	February 4, 1839 – February 7, 1842	Whig	
	George P. Barker	February 7, 1842 – February 3, 1845	Democratic	
	John Van Buren	February 3, 1845 – January 1, 1848	Democratic	Legislated out of office by the Constitution of 1846
	Ambrose L. Jordan	January 1, 1848 – December 31, 1849	Whig	First attorney general elected by general ballot
	Levi S. Chatfield	January 1, 1850 – November 23, 1853	Democratic	Resigned shortly before the end of his second term
	Gardner Stow	December 8, 1853 – December 31, 1853	Democratic	Appointed to fill the unexpired term
	Ogden Hoffman	January 1, 1854 – December 31, 1855	Whig	
	Stephen B. Cushing	January 1, 1856 – December 31, 1857	American	
	Lyman Tremain	January 1, 1858 – December 31, 1859	Democratic	
	Charles G. Myers	January 1, 1860 – December 31, 1861	Republican	
	Daniel S. Dickinson	January 1, 1862 – December 31, 1863	Union	
	John Cochrane	January 1, 1864 – December 31, 1865	Union	
	John H. Martindale	January 1, 1866 – December 31, 1867	Republican	
	Marshall B. Champlain	January 1, 1868 – December 31, 1871	Democratic	Two terms
	Francis C. Barlow	January 1, 1872 – December 31, 1873	Republican	
	Daniel Pratt	January 1, 1874 – December 31, 1875	Democratic	
	Charles S. Fairchild	January 1, 1876 – December 31, 1877	Democratic	
	Augustus Schoonmaker Jr.	January 1, 1878 – December 31, 1879	Democratic	
	Hamilton Ward Sr.	January 1, 1880 – December 31, 1881	Republican	
	Leslie W. Russell	January 1, 1882 – December 31, 1883	Republican	
	Denis O'Brien	January 1, 1884 – December 31, 1887	Democratic	Two terms
	Charles F. Tabor	January 1, 1888 – December 31, 1891	Democratic	Two terms
	Simon W. Rosendale	January 1, 1892 – December 31, 1893	Democratic	
	Theodore E. Hancock	January 1, 1894 – December 31, 1898	Republican	Two terms (1894–1895; 1896–1898)
	John C. Davies	January 1, 1899 – December 31, 1902	Republican	Two terms
	John Cunneen	January 1, 1903 – December 31, 1904	Democratic	
	Julius M. Mayer	January 1, 1905 – December 31, 1906	Republican	
	William S. Jackson	January 1, 1907 – December 31, 1908	Democratic	
	Edward R. O'Malley	January 1, 1909 – December 31, 1910	Republican	
	Thomas Carmody	January 1, 1911 – September 2, 1914	Democratic	Resigned shortly before the end of his second term
	James A. Parsons	September 2, 1914 – December 31, 1914	Democratic	Appointed to fill the unexpired term
	Egburt E. Woodbury	January 1, 1915 – April 19, 1917	Republican	Resigned during his second term
	Merton E. Lewis	April 19, 1917 – December 31, 1918	Republican	As first deputy AG acted until being elected by the State Legislature on April 25 to fill unexpired first half of term, then re-elected in special election (Nov. 1917) for the other half (1918)
	Charles D. Newton	January 1, 1919 – December 31, 1922	Republican	Two terms
	Carl Sherman	January 1, 1923 – December 31, 1924	Democratic	Defeated for reelection in 1924
	Albert Ottinger	January 1, 1925 – December 31, 1928	Republican	Two terms; unsuccessful Republican nominee for governor in 1928
	Hamilton Ward Jr.	January 1, 1929 – December 31, 1930	Republican	Son of Hamilton Ward Sr. (AG from 1880 to 1881)
	John J. Bennett Jr.	January 1, 1931 – December 31, 1942	Democratic	Five terms
	Nathaniel L. Goldstein	January 1, 1943 – December 31, 1954	Republican	Three terms
	Jacob K. Javits	January 1, 1955 – January 9, 1957	Republican	Resigned having been elected U.S. senator
	Louis J. Lefkowitz	January 9, 1957 – December 31, 1978	Republican	Re-elected by the State Legislature to fill the unexpired term, then re-elected to five more terms, longest-serving attorney general (8 days short of 22 years)
	Robert Abrams	January 1, 1979 – December 31, 1993	Democratic	Elected to four terms, resigning a year before the end of his fourth term
	G. Oliver Koppell	January 1, 1994 – December 31, 1994	Democratic	Elected by the State Legislature to fill unexpired term
	Dennis Vacco	January 1, 1995 – December 31, 1998	Republican	Defeated for reelection in 1998. Joined Waste Management, Inc. as vice president for New York government affairs. Became a partner in Buffalo law firm, Lippes Mathias Wexler Friedman.
	Eliot Spitzer	January 1, 1999 – December 31, 2006	Democratic	Two terms, then elected governor
	Andrew Cuomo	January 1, 2007 – December 31, 2010	Democratic	One term, then elected governor
	Eric Schneiderman	January 1, 2011 – May 8, 2018	Democratic	Resigned during his second term
	Barbara D. Underwood	May 8, 2018 – December 31, 2018	Democratic	Served as acting attorney general from May 8 to May 22, when she was confirmed by the New York State Legislature.
	Letitia "Tish" James	January 1, 2019 – present	Democratic	

== See also ==
- New York Attorney General elections
- Law of New York
