= 93rd United States Congress =

1973–1975 U.S. Congress

| ← | 92nd | 94th | → |
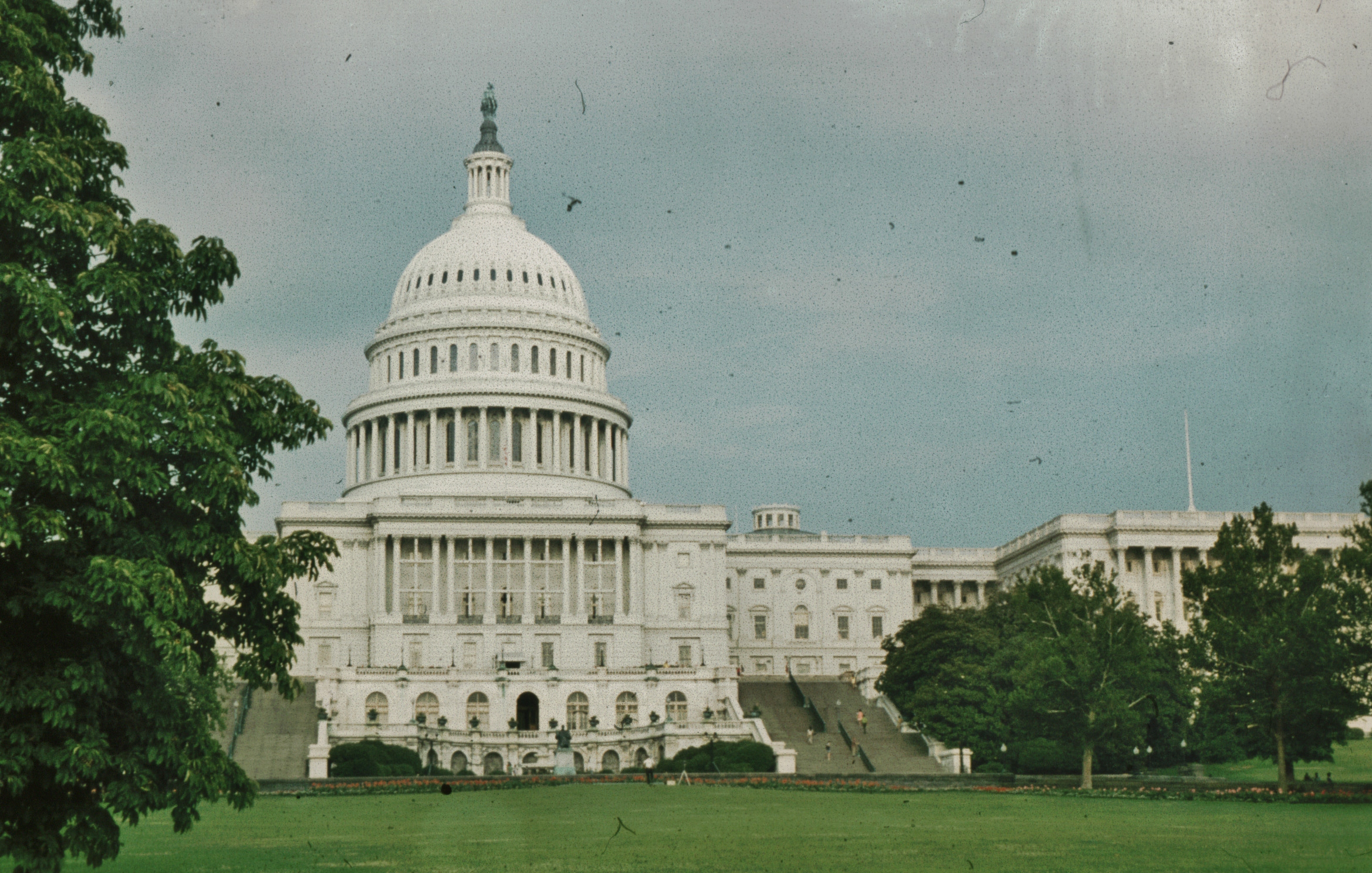
- United States Capitol (c. 1970)

Overview
- Legislative body: United States Congress
- Jurisdiction: United States
- Term: January 3, 1973 – January 3, 1975

Senate
- Members: 100
- President: Spiro Agnew (R) (Note: U.S. Vice President Spiro Agnew's term as President of the Senate ended on October 10, 1973, when he resigned.) (until October 10, 1973); Vacant (Note: President pro tempore James Eastland acted his duties as the President of the Senate during the period.) (Oct 10–Dec 6, 1973); Gerald Ford (R) (Note: U.S. Vice President Gerald Ford's term as President of the Senate ended at noon on August 9, 1974 when he ascended to the presidency.) (Dec 6, 1973 – Aug 9, 1974); Vacant (Aug 9–Dec 19, 1974); Nelson Rockefeller (R) (from December 19, 1974)
- President pro tempore: James Eastland (D)
- Party control: Democratic

House of Representatives
- Members: 435
- Speaker: Carl Albert (D)
- Party control: Democratic

Sessions
- 1st: January 3, 1973 – December 22, 1973
- 2nd: January 21, 1974 – December 20, 1974

The 93rd United States Congress was a meeting of the legislative branch of the United States federal government, composed of the United States Senate and the United States House of Representatives. It met in Washington, D.C., from January 3, 1973, to January 3, 1975, during the last 19 months of Richard Nixon's presidency, and the first 5 months of Gerald Ford's. This Congress was the first (and, to date, only) Congress with more than two Senate presidents (in this case, three). After the resignation of Spiro Agnew, Gerald Ford was appointed under the authority of the newly ratified Twenty-fifth Amendment to the United States Constitution. Ford became president the next year and Nelson Rockefeller was appointed in his place. The apportionment of seats in the House of Representatives was based on the 1970 United States census. Both chambers had a Democratic majority.

== Major events ==
- January 20, 1973: President Richard Nixon began his second term.
- January 22, 1973: Supreme Court issued abortion decision, Roe v. Wade
- January 27, 1973: Paris Peace Accords signed
- October 10, 1973: Vice President Spiro Agnew resigned
- October 20, 1973: Saturday Night Massacre
- October 30, 1973: Impeachment proceedings against President Nixon initiated
- December 6, 1973: Vice President Gerald Ford confirmed and inaugurated
- August 9, 1974: President Richard Nixon resigned, Vice President Gerald Ford became president
- November 5, 1974: United States midterm elections: Democrats increased their majorities in both houses
- December 19, 1974: Vice President Nelson Rockefeller confirmed and inaugurated
  - First television broadcast from the Senate chamber, as Nelson Rockefeller was sworn into office

== Major legislation ==
- July 1, 1973: Case–Church Amendment, Pub. L. 93–52, title I, 87 Stat. 130
- August 13, 1973: Federal Aid Highway Act of 1973, Pub. L. 93–87, title I, 87 Stat. 250
- September 26, 1973: Rehabilitation Act of 1973, Pub. L. 93–112, 87 Stat. 355
- October 1, 1973: Domestic Volunteer Services Act of 1973 (VISTA), Pub. L. 93–113, 87 Stat. 394
- October 4, 1973: Oil Pollution Act of 1973, Pub. L. 93–119, 87 Stat. 424-2
- November 3, 1973: Amtrak Improvement Act, Pub. L. 93–146, 87 Stat. 548
- November 7, 1973: War Powers Resolution, Pub. L. 93–148, 87 Stat. 555
- December 28, 1973: Comprehensive Employment and Training Act, Pub. L. 93–203
- December 28, 1973: Endangered Species Act, Pub. L. 93–205, 87 Stat. 884
- December 29, 1973: Health Maintenance Organization Act of 1973, Pub. L. 93–222
- March 7, 1974: Water Resources Development Act of 1974, Pub. L. 93–251, 88 Stat. 34
- May 22, 1974: Disaster Relief Act of 1974, Pub. L. 93–288, 88 Stat. 143
- July 12, 1974: Congressional Budget and Impoundment Control Act of 1974, Pub. L. 93–344, 88 Stat. 297
- July 25, 1974: Legal Services Corporation Act, Pub. L. 93–355, 88 Stat. 378
- August 21, 1974: Family Educational Rights and Privacy Act, Pub. L. 93–380, title V, §513, 88 Stat. 571
- September 2, 1974: Employee Retirement Income Security Act (ERISA), Pub. L. 93–406, 88 Stat. 829
- September 7, 1974: Juvenile Justice and Delinquency Prevention Act of 1974, Pub. L. 93–415, 88 Stat. 1109
- October 15, 1974: Federal Election Campaign Act, Pub. L. 93–443, 88 Stat. 1263
- October 28, 1974: Equal Credit Opportunity Act, Pub. L. 93–495, 88 Stat. 1521
- October 29, 1974: Federal Fire Prevention and Control Act of 1974, Pub. L. 93–498, 88 Stat. 1535
- November 26, 1974: National Mass Transportation Assistance Act, Pub. L. 93–503, 88 Stat. 1565
- December 3, 1974: Vietnam Era Veterans' Readjustment Assistance Act, Pub. L. 93–508, 88 Stat. 1578
- December 16, 1974: Safe Drinking Water Act, Pub. L. 93–523, 88 Stat. 1660
- December 31, 1974: Privacy Act of 1974, Pub. L. 93–579, 88 Stat. 1896
- January 2, 1975: An Act to Establish Rules of Evidence for Certain Courts and Proceedings, Pub. L. 93–595, 88 Stat. 1926
- January 3, 1975: Trade Act of 1974, Pub. L. 93–618, 88 Stat. 1978
- January 3, 1975: Hazardous Materials Transportation Act, Pub. L. 93–633, title I, 88 Stat. 2156
- January 4, 1975: Magnuson–Moss Warranty Act, Pub. L. 93–637, 88 Stat. 2183
- January 4, 1975: Indian Self-Determination and Education Assistance Act of 1975, Pub. L. 93–638, 88 Stat. 2203
- January 4, 1975: National Health Planning and Resources Development Act, Pub. L. 93–641, 88 Stat. 2225

== Hearings ==
- May 17, 1973: Watergate hearings began (Senate Select Committee on Presidential Campaign Activities)
- May 9, 1974: Hearings on the impeachment of President Nixon began (House Judiciary Committee)

== Party summary ==
Makeup of the U.S. Senate at the start of this Congress, color-coded by party. Note: The orange stripes in New York and the green stripes in Virginia denote Conservative James Buckley and Independent Harry F. Byrd Jr., respectively.

=== Senate ===
| | Party (shading indicates majority caucus) | | | | Total | |
| | Democratic | Republican | Conservative | Independent | Total | Vacant |
|---|---|---|---|---|---|---|
| End of the previous Congress | 54 | 44 | 1 | 1 | 100 | 0 |
| Begin | 56 | 42 | 1 | 1 | 100 | 0 |
| End | 56 | 40 | 1 | 1 | 98 | 2 |
| Final voting share | 57.6% | 40.4% | 1.0% | 1.0% | | |
| Beginning of the next Congress | 60 | 37 | 1 | 1 | 99 | 1 |

=== House of Representatives ===
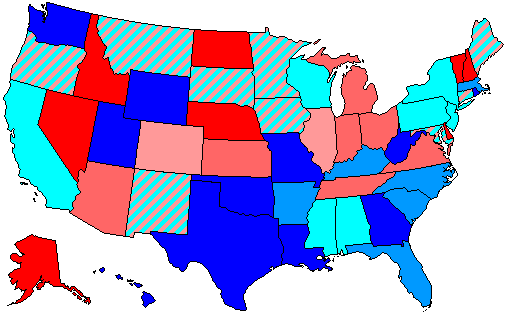
House seats by party holding plurality in state: over 80% Democratic / over 80% Republican; 60+% to 80% Democratic / 60+% to 80% Republican; up to 60% Democratic / up to 60% Republican

| | Party (shading indicates majority caucus) | | Total | |
| | Democratic | Republican | Total | Vacant |
|---|---|---|---|---|
| End of previous Congress | 252 | 178 | 430 | 5 |
| Begin | 241 | 192 | 433 | 2 |
| End | 232 | 174 | 406 | 29 |
| Final voting share | 57.1% | 42.9% | | |
| Beginning of next Congress | 291 | 144 | 435 | 0 |

== Leadership ==
Senate President

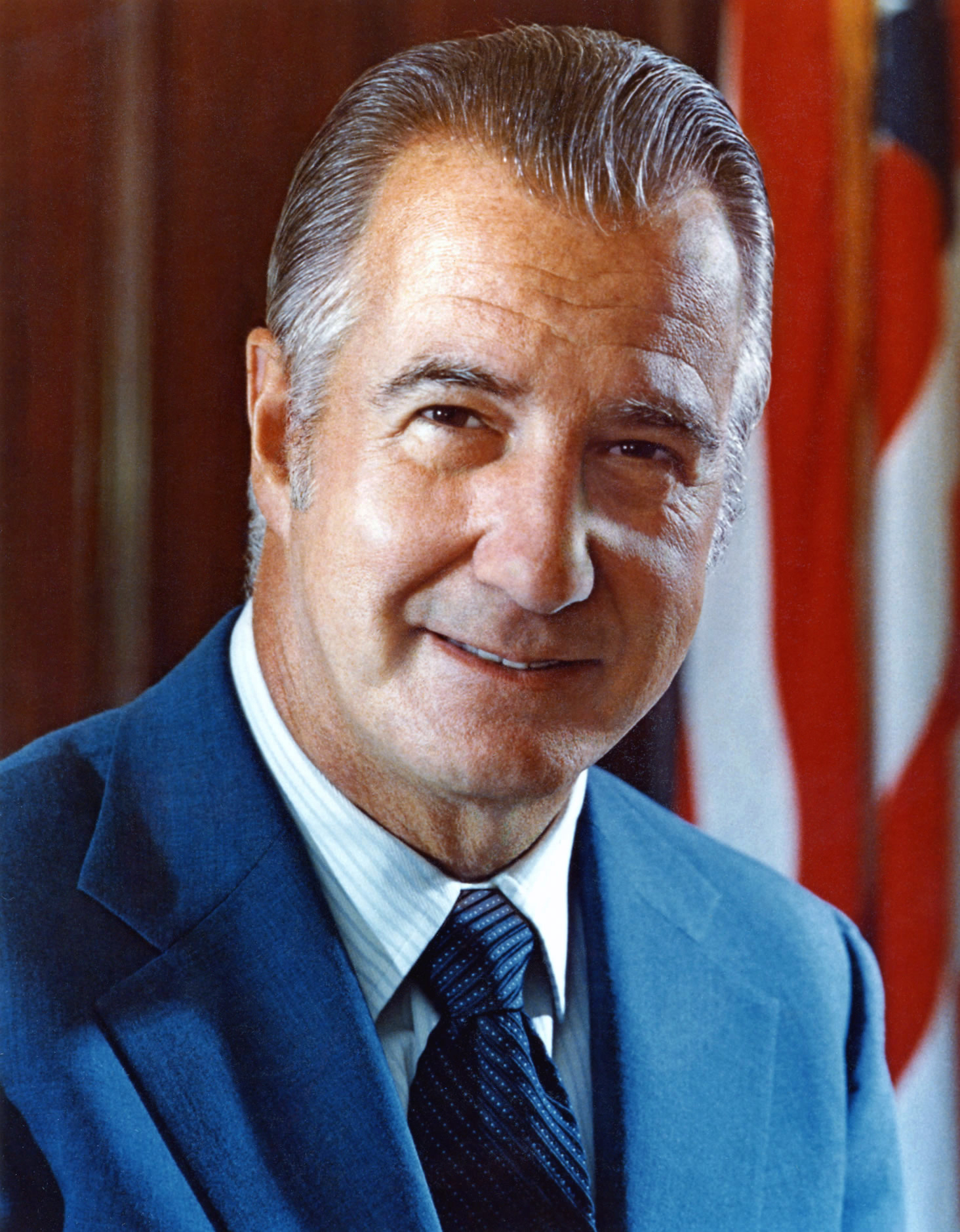
Spiro Agnew (R)
(until October 10, 1973)

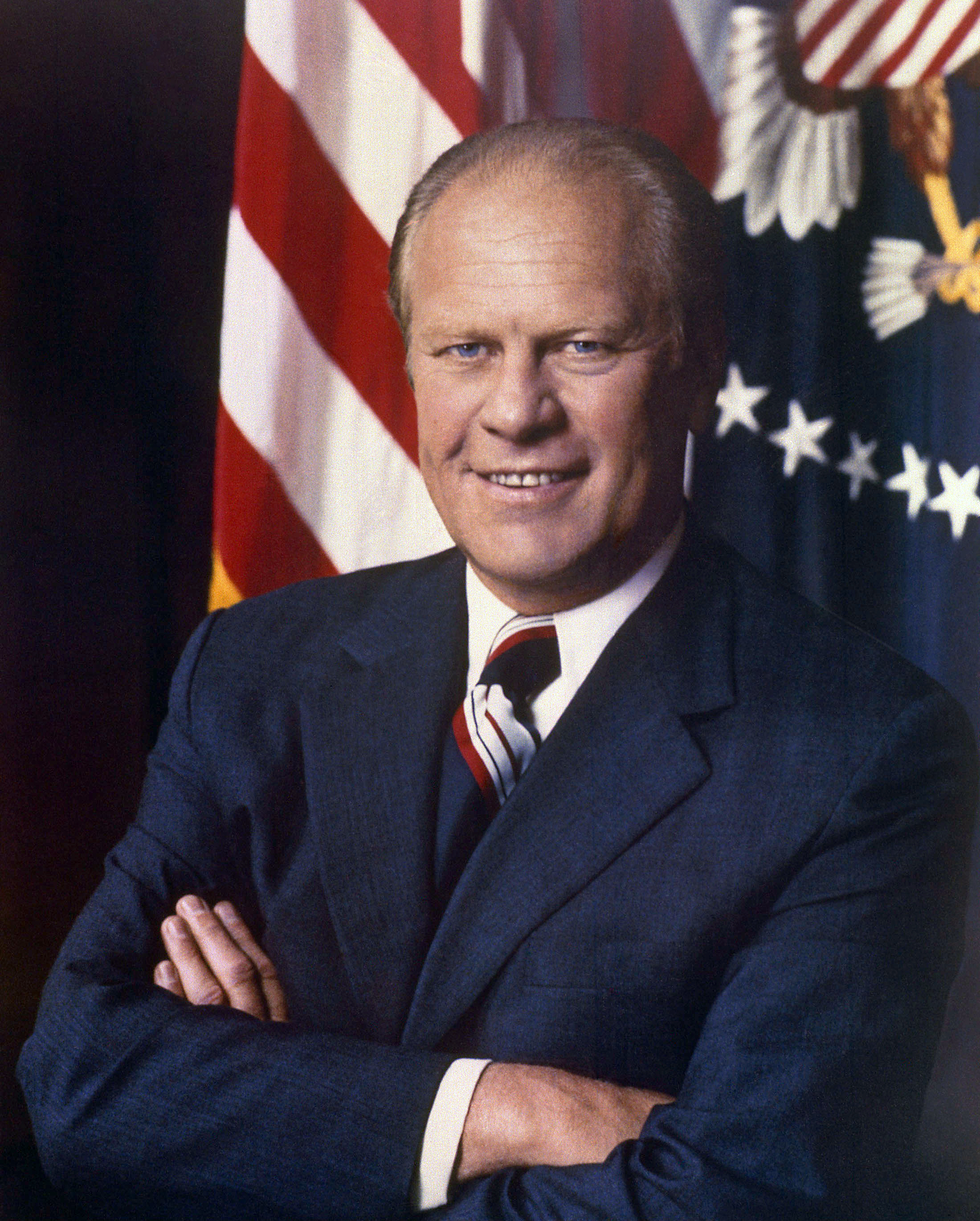
Gerald Ford (R)
(December 6, 1973 – August 9, 1974)

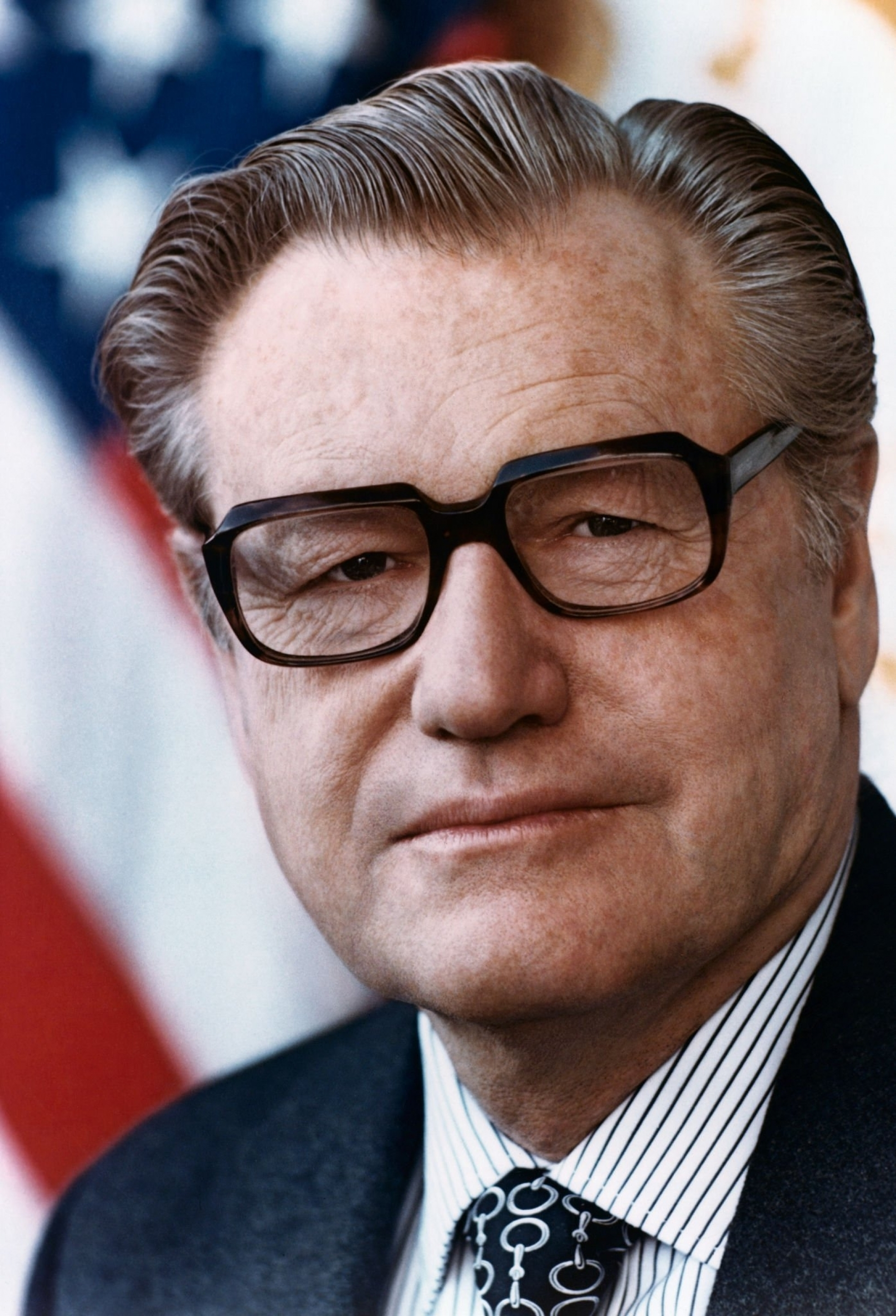
Nelson Rockefeller (R)
(from December 19, 1974)

=== Senate ===
- President: Spiro Agnew (R) until October 10, 1973
  - Gerald Ford (R) December 6, 1973 – August 9, 1974
    - Nelson Rockefeller (R) from December 19, 1974
- President pro tempore: James Eastland (D)
- Permanent acting president pro tempore: Lee Metcalf (D)

==== Majority (Democratic) leadership ====
- Majority Leader: Mike Mansfield
- Majority Whip: Robert Byrd
- Democratic Caucus Secretary: Frank Moss

==== Minority (Republican) leadership ====
- Minority Leader: Hugh Scott
- Minority Whip: Robert P. Griffin
- Republican Conference Chairman: Norris Cotton
- Republican Conference Secretary: Wallace F. Bennett
- National Senatorial Committee Chair: Bill Brock
- Policy Committee Chairman: John Tower

=== House of Representatives ===
- Speaker: Carl Albert (D)

==== Majority (Democratic) leadership ====
- Majority Leader: Tip O'Neill
- Majority Whip: John J. McFall
- Democratic Caucus Chairman: Olin E. Teague
- Democratic Caucus Secretary: Leonor Sullivan
- Democratic Campaign Committee Chairman: Wayne Hays

==== Minority (Republican) leadership ====
- Minority Leader: Gerald Ford until December 6, 1973
  - John Jacob Rhodes from December 7, 1973
- Minority Whip: Leslie C. Arends
- Republican Conference Chairman: John B. Anderson
- Republican Conference Vice-chairman: Samuel L. Devine
- Republican Conference Secretary: Jack Edwards
- Policy Committee Chairman: Barber Conable
- Republican Campaign Committee Chairman: Robert H. Michel

== Caucuses ==
- Congressional Black Caucus
- House Democratic Caucus
- Senate Democratic Caucus

== Members ==
This list is arranged by chamber, then by state. Senators are listed by class, and representatives are listed by district.

Skip down to House of Representatives

=== Senate ===
Senators are popularly elected statewide every two years, with one-third beginning new six-year terms with each Congress. Preceding the names in the list below are Senate class numbers, which indicate the cycle of their election. In this Congress, Class 1 means their term began in the last Congress, facing re-election in 1976; Class 2 means their term began with this Congress, facing re-election in 1978; and Class 3 means their term ended with this Congress, facing re-election in 1974.

==== Alabama ====
▌2. John Sparkman (D)
▌3. James Allen (D)

==== Alaska ====
▌2. Ted Stevens (R)
▌3. Mike Gravel (D)

==== Arizona ====
▌1. Paul Fannin (R)
▌3. Barry Goldwater (R)

==== Arkansas ====
▌2. John L. McClellan (D)
▌3. J. William Fulbright (D), until December 31, 1974

==== California ====
▌1. John V. Tunney (D)
▌3. Alan Cranston (D)

==== Colorado ====
▌2. Floyd Haskell (D)
▌3. Peter H. Dominick (R)

==== Connecticut ====
▌1. Lowell Weicker (R)
▌3. Abraham Ribicoff (D)

==== Delaware ====
▌1. William Roth (R)
▌2. Joe Biden (D)

==== Florida ====
▌1. Lawton Chiles (D)
▌3. Edward Gurney (R), until December 31, 1974

▌Richard Stone (D), from January 1, 1975

==== Georgia ====
▌2. Sam Nunn (D)
▌3. Herman Talmadge (D)

==== Hawaii ====
▌1. Hiram Fong (R)
▌3. Daniel Inouye (D)

==== Idaho ====
▌2. James A. McClure (R)
▌3. Frank Church (D)

==== Illinois ====
▌2. Charles H. Percy (R)
▌3. Adlai Stevenson III (D)

==== Indiana ====
▌1. Vance Hartke (D)
▌3. Birch Bayh (D)

==== Iowa ====
▌2. Dick Clark (D)
▌3. Harold Hughes (D)

==== Kansas ====
▌2. James B. Pearson (R)
▌3. Bob Dole (R)

==== Kentucky ====
▌2. Walter Dee Huddleston (D)
▌3. Marlow Cook (R), until December 27, 1974

▌Wendell Ford (D), from December 28, 1974

==== Louisiana ====
▌2. J. Bennett Johnston (D)
▌3. Russell B. Long (D)

==== Maine ====
▌1. Edmund Muskie (D)
▌2. William Hathaway (D)

==== Maryland ====
▌1. J. Glenn Beall Jr. (R)
▌3. Charles Mathias (R)

==== Massachusetts ====
▌1. Ted Kennedy (D)
▌2. Edward Brooke (R)

==== Michigan ====
▌1. Philip Hart (D)
▌2. Robert P. Griffin (R)

==== Minnesota ====
▌1. Hubert Humphrey (DFL) (Note: The Minnesota Democratic–Farmer–Labor Party (DFL) and the North Dakota Democratic-Nonpartisan League Party (D-NPL) are the Minnesota and North Dakota affiliates of the U.S. Democratic Party and are counted as Democrats.)
▌2. Walter Mondale (DFL)

==== Mississippi ====
▌1. John C. Stennis (D)
▌2. James Eastland (D)

==== Missouri ====
▌1. Stuart Symington (D)
▌3. Thomas Eagleton (D)

==== Montana ====
▌1. Mike Mansfield (D)
▌2. Lee Metcalf (D)

==== Nebraska ====
▌1. Roman Hruska (R)
▌2. Carl Curtis (R)

==== Nevada ====
▌1. Howard Cannon (D)
▌3. Alan Bible (D), until December 17, 1974

▌Paul Laxalt (R), from December 18, 1974

==== New Hampshire ====
▌2. Thomas J. McIntyre (D)
▌3. Norris Cotton (R), until December 31, 1974

▌Louis C. Wyman (R), from December 31, 1974

==== New Jersey ====
▌1. Harrison A. Williams (D)
▌2. Clifford P. Case (R)

==== New Mexico ====
▌1. Joseph Montoya (D)
▌2. Pete Domenici (R)

==== New York ====
▌1. James L. Buckley (C)
▌3. Jacob Javits (R)

==== North Carolina ====
▌2. Jesse Helms (R)
▌3. Sam Ervin (D), until December 31, 1974

==== North Dakota ====
▌1. Quentin Burdick (D-NPL)
▌3. Milton Young (R)

==== Ohio ====
▌1. Robert Taft Jr. (R)
▌3. William B. Saxbe (R), until January 3, 1974

▌Howard Metzenbaum (D), January 4, 1974 – December 23, 1974
▌John Glenn (D), from December 24, 1974

==== Oklahoma ====
▌2. Dewey F. Bartlett (R)
▌3. Henry Bellmon (R)

==== Oregon ====
▌2. Mark Hatfield (R)
▌3. Bob Packwood (R)

==== Pennsylvania ====
▌1. Hugh Scott (R)
▌3. Richard Schweiker (R)

==== Rhode Island ====
▌1. John Pastore (D)
▌2. Claiborne Pell (D)

==== South Carolina ====
▌2. Strom Thurmond (R)
▌3. Fritz Hollings (D)

==== South Dakota ====
▌2. James Abourezk (D)
▌3. George McGovern (D)

==== Tennessee ====
▌1. Bill Brock (R)
▌2. Howard Baker (R)

==== Texas ====
▌1. Lloyd Bentsen (D)
▌2. John Tower (R)

==== Utah ====
▌1. Frank Moss (D)
▌3. Wallace F. Bennett (R), until December 20, 1974

▌Jake Garn (R), from December 21, 1974

==== Vermont ====
▌1. Robert Stafford (R)
▌3. George Aiken (R)

==== Virginia ====
▌1. Harry F. Byrd Jr. (ID)
▌2. William L. Scott (R)

==== Washington ====
▌1. Henry M. Jackson (D)
▌3. Warren G. Magnuson (D)

==== West Virginia ====
▌1. Robert Byrd (D)
▌2. Jennings Randolph (D)

==== Wisconsin ====
▌1. William Proxmire (D)
▌3. Gaylord Nelson (D)

==== Wyoming ====
▌1. Gale W. McGee (D)
▌2. Clifford Hansen (R)

Senate majority leadership

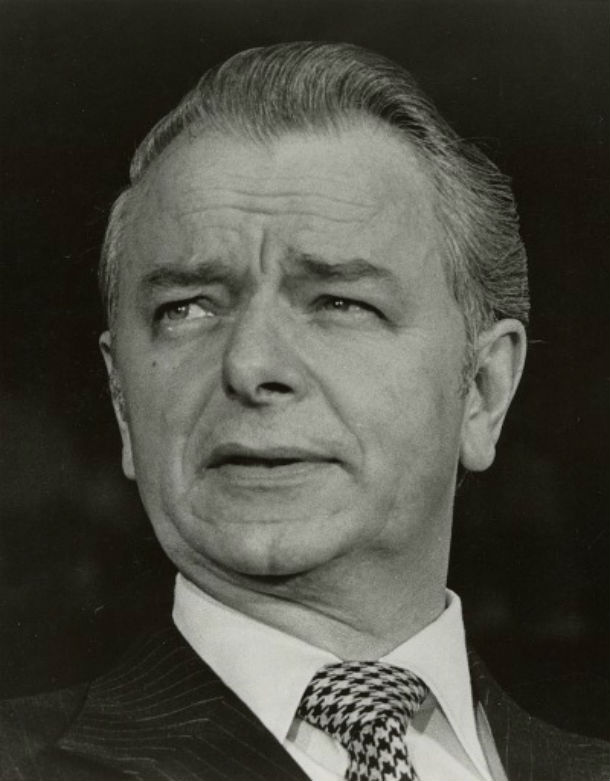
Democratic whip
Robert Byrd

Senate minority leadership

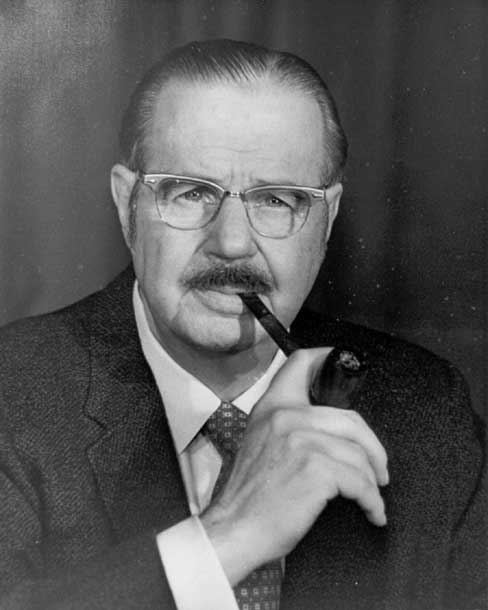
Republican leader
Hugh Scott

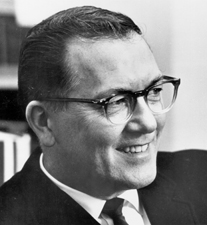
Republican whip
Robert P. Griffin

=== House of Representatives ===
The names of representatives are preceded by their district numbers.

==== Alabama ====
▌1. Jack Edwards (R)
▌2. William Louis Dickinson (R)
▌3. Bill Nichols (D)
▌4. Tom Bevill (D)
▌5. Robert E. Jones Jr. (D)
▌6. John Hall Buchanan Jr. (R)
▌7. Walter Flowers (D)

==== Alaska ====
▌At-large. Don Young (R), from March 6, 1973

==== Arizona ====
▌1. John Jacob Rhodes (R)
▌2. Mo Udall (D)
▌3. Sam Steiger (R)
▌4. John Bertrand Conlan (R)

==== Arkansas ====
▌1. William Vollie Alexander Jr. (D)
▌2. Wilbur Mills (D)
▌3. John Paul Hammerschmidt (R)
▌4. Ray Thornton (D)

==== California ====
▌1. Donald H. Clausen (R)
▌2. Harold T. Johnson (D)
▌3. John E. Moss (D)
▌4. Robert L. Leggett (D)
▌5. Phillip Burton (D)
▌6. William S. Mailliard (R), until March 5, 1974

▌John Burton (D), from June 4, 1974

▌7. Ron Dellums (D)
▌8. Pete Stark (D)
▌9. Don Edwards (D)
▌10. Charles Gubser (R), until December 31, 1974
▌11. Leo Ryan (D)
▌12. Burt Talcott (R)
▌13. Charles M. Teague (R), until January 1, 1974

▌Robert J. Lagomarsino (R), from March 5, 1974

▌14. Jerome Waldie (D)
▌15. John J. McFall (D)
▌16. B. F. Sisk (D)
▌17. Pete McCloskey (R)
▌18. Bob Mathias (R)
▌19. Chester E. Holifield (D), until December 31, 1974
▌20. Carlos Moorhead (R)
▌21. Augustus Hawkins (D)
▌22. James C. Corman (D)
▌23. Del M. Clawson (R)
▌24. John H. Rousselot (R)
▌25. Charles E. Wiggins (R)
▌26. Thomas M. Rees (D)
▌27. Barry Goldwater Jr. (R)
▌28. Alphonzo E. Bell Jr. (R)
▌29. George E. Danielson (D)
▌30. Edward R. Roybal (D)
▌31. Charles H. Wilson (D)
▌32. Craig Hosmer (R), until December 31, 1974
▌33. Jerry Pettis (R)
▌34. Richard T. Hanna (D), until December 31, 1974
▌35. Glenn M. Anderson (D)
▌36. William M. Ketchum (R)
▌37. Yvonne Brathwaite Burke (D)
▌38. George Brown Jr. (D)
▌39. Andrew J. Hinshaw (R)
▌40. Bob Wilson (R)
▌41. Lionel Van Deerlin (D)
▌42. Clair Burgener (R)
▌43. Victor Veysey (R)

==== Colorado ====
▌1. Pat Schroeder (D)
▌2. Donald G. Brotzman (R)
▌3. Frank Evans (D)
▌4. James Paul Johnson (R)
▌5. William L. Armstrong (R)

==== Connecticut ====
▌1. William R. Cotter (D)
▌2. Robert H. Steele (R)
▌3. Robert Giaimo (D)
▌4. Stewart McKinney (R)
▌5. Ronald A. Sarasin (R)
▌6. Ella Grasso (D)

==== Delaware ====
▌At-large. Pete du Pont (R)

==== Florida ====
▌1. Robert L. F. Sikes (D)
▌2. Don Fuqua (D)
▌3. Charles E. Bennett (D)
▌4. Bill Chappell (D)
▌5. Bill Gunter (D)
▌6. Bill Young (R)
▌7. Sam Gibbons (D)
▌8. James A. Haley (D)
▌9. Louis Frey Jr. (R)
▌10. Skip Bafalis (R)
▌11. Paul Rogers (D)
▌12. J. Herbert Burke (R)
▌13. William Lehman (D)
▌14. Claude Pepper (D)
▌15. Dante Fascell (D)

==== Georgia ====
▌1. Bo Ginn (D)
▌2. Dawson Mathis (D)
▌3. Jack Brinkley (D)
▌4. Benjamin B. Blackburn (R)
▌5. Andrew Young (D)
▌6. John Flynt (D)
▌7. John William Davis (D)
▌8. W. S. Stuckey Jr. (D)
▌9. Phillip M. Landrum (D)
▌10. Robert Grier Stephens Jr. (D)

==== Hawaii ====
▌1. Spark Matsunaga (D)
▌2. Patsy Mink (D)

==== Idaho ====
▌1. Steve Symms (R)
▌2. Orval H. Hansen (R)

==== Illinois ====
▌1. Ralph Metcalfe (D)
▌2. Morgan F. Murphy (D)
▌3. Robert P. Hanrahan (R)
▌4. Ed Derwinski (R)
▌5. John C. Kluczynski (D)
▌6. Harold R. Collier (R)
▌7. Cardiss Collins (D), from June 5, 1973
▌8. Dan Rostenkowski (D)
▌9. Sidney R. Yates (D)
▌10. Samuel H. Young (R)
▌11. Frank Annunzio (D)
▌12. Phil Crane (R)
▌13. Robert McClory (R)
▌14. John N. Erlenborn (R)
▌15. Leslie C. Arends (R), until December 31, 1974
▌16. John B. Anderson (R)
▌17. George M. O'Brien (R)
▌18. Robert H. Michel (R)
▌19. Tom Railsback (R)
▌20. Paul Findley (R)
▌21. Edward Rell Madigan (R)
▌22. George E. Shipley (D)
▌23. Melvin Price (D)
▌24. Kenneth J. Gray (D), until December 31, 1974

==== Indiana ====
▌1. Ray Madden (D)
▌2. Earl Landgrebe (R)
▌3. John Brademas (D)
▌4. J. Edward Roush (D)
▌5. Elwood Hillis (R)
▌6. William G. Bray (R)
▌7. John T. Myers (R)
▌8. Roger H. Zion (R)
▌9. Lee H. Hamilton (D)
▌10. David W. Dennis (R)
▌11. William H. Hudnut III (R)

==== Iowa ====
▌1. Edward Mezvinsky (D)
▌2. John Culver (D)
▌3. H. R. Gross (R)
▌4. Neal Edward Smith (D)
▌5. William J. Scherle (R)
▌6. Wiley Mayne (R)

==== Kansas ====
▌1. Keith Sebelius (R)
▌2. William R. Roy (D)
▌3. Larry Winn (R)
▌4. Garner E. Shriver (R)
▌5. Joe Skubitz (R)

==== Kentucky ====
▌1. Frank Stubblefield (D), until December 31, 1974
▌2. William Natcher (D)
▌3. Romano Mazzoli (D)
▌4. Gene Snyder (R)
▌5. Tim Lee Carter (R)
▌6. John B. Breckinridge (D)
▌7. Carl D. Perkins (D)

==== Louisiana ====
▌1. F. Edward Hébert (D)
▌2. Lindy Boggs (D), from March 20, 1973
▌3. Dave Treen (R)
▌4. Joe Waggonner (D)
▌5. Otto Passman (D)
▌6. John Rarick (D)
▌7. John Breaux (D)
▌8. Gillis William Long (D)

==== Maine ====
▌1. Peter Kyros (D)
▌2. William Cohen (R)

==== Maryland ====
▌1. William Oswald Mills (R), until May 24, 1973

▌Robert Bauman (R), from August 21, 1973

▌2. Clarence Long (D)
▌3. Paul Sarbanes (D)
▌4. Marjorie Holt (R)
▌5. Lawrence Hogan (R)
▌6. Goodloe Byron (D)
▌7. Parren Mitchell (D)
▌8. Gilbert Gude (R)

==== Massachusetts ====
▌1. Silvio O. Conte (R)
▌2. Edward Boland (D)
▌3. Harold Donohue (D), until December 31, 1974
▌4. Robert Drinan (D)
▌5. Paul W. Cronin (R)
▌6. Michael J. Harrington (D)
▌7. Torbert Macdonald (D)
▌8. Tip O'Neill (D)
▌9. Joe Moakley (D)
▌10. Margaret Heckler (R)
▌11. James A. Burke (D)
▌12. Gerry Studds (D)

==== Michigan ====
▌1. John Conyers (D)
▌2. Marvin L. Esch (R)
▌3. Garry E. Brown (R)
▌4. J. Edward Hutchinson (R)
▌5. Gerald Ford (R), until December 6, 1973

▌Richard Vander Veen (D), from February 18, 1974

▌6. Charles E. Chamberlain (R), until December 31, 1974
▌▌7. Donald Riegle (R), then (D)
▌8. R. James Harvey (R), until January 31, 1974

▌J. Bob Traxler (D), from April 23, 1974

▌9. Guy Vander Jagt (R)
▌10. Elford Albin Cederberg (R)
▌11. Philip Ruppe (R)
▌12. James G. O'Hara (D)
▌13. Charles Diggs (D)
▌14. Lucien Nedzi (D)
▌15. William D. Ford (D)
▌16. John D. Dingell Jr. (D)
▌17. Martha Griffiths (D), until December 31, 1974
▌18. Robert J. Huber (R)
▌19. William Broomfield (R)

==== Minnesota ====
▌1. Al Quie (R)
▌2. Ancher Nelsen (R), until December 31, 1974
▌3. Bill Frenzel (R)
▌4. Joseph Karth (DFL)
▌5. Donald M. Fraser (DFL)
▌6. John M. Zwach (R)
▌7. Robert Bergland (DFL)
▌8. John Blatnik (DFL), until December 31, 1974

==== Mississippi ====
▌1. Jamie L. Whitten (D)
▌2. David R. Bowen (D)
▌3. Sonny Montgomery (D)
▌4. Thad Cochran (R)
▌5. Trent Lott (R)

==== Missouri ====
▌1. Bill Clay (D)
▌2. James W. Symington (D)
▌3. Leonor Sullivan (D)
▌4. William J. Randall (D)
▌5. Richard Walker Bolling (D)
▌6. Jerry Litton (D)
▌7. Gene Taylor (R)
▌8. Richard Howard Ichord Jr. (D)
▌9. William L. Hungate (D)
▌10. Bill Burlison (D)

==== Montana ====
▌1. Richard G. Shoup (R)
▌2. John Melcher (D)

==== Nebraska ====
▌1. Charles Thone (R)
▌2. John Y. McCollister (R)
▌3. David Martin (R), until December 31, 1974

==== Nevada ====
▌At-large. David Towell (R)

==== New Hampshire ====
▌1. Louis C. Wyman (R), until December 31, 1974
▌2. James Colgate Cleveland (R)

==== New Jersey ====
▌1. John E. Hunt (R)
▌2. Charles W. Sandman Jr. (R)
▌3. James J. Howard (D)
▌4. Frank Thompson (D)
▌5. Peter Frelinghuysen Jr. (R)
▌6. Edwin B. Forsythe (R)
▌7. William B. Widnall (R), until December 31, 1974
▌8. Robert A. Roe (D)
▌9. Henry Helstoski (D)
▌10. Peter W. Rodino (D)
▌11. Joseph Minish (D)
▌12. Matthew John Rinaldo (R)
▌13. Joseph J. Maraziti (R)
▌14. Dominick V. Daniels (D)
▌15. Edward J. Patten (D)

==== New Mexico ====
▌1. Manuel Lujan Jr. (R)
▌2. Harold L. Runnels (D)

==== New York ====
▌1. Otis G. Pike (D)
▌2. James R. Grover Jr. (R)
▌3. Angelo D. Roncallo (R)
▌4. Norman F. Lent (R)
▌5. John W. Wydler (R)
▌6. Lester L. Wolff (D)
▌7. Joseph P. Addabbo (D)
▌8. Benjamin Stanley Rosenthal (D)
▌9. James J. Delaney (D)
▌10. Mario Biaggi (D)
▌11. Frank J. Brasco (D)
▌12. Shirley Chisholm (D)
▌13. Bertram L. Podell (D)
▌14. John J. Rooney (D), until December 31, 1974
▌15. Hugh Carey (D), until December 31, 1974
▌16. Elizabeth Holtzman (D)
▌17. John M. Murphy (D)
▌18. Ed Koch (D)
▌19. Charles Rangel (D)
▌20. Bella Abzug (D)
▌21. Herman Badillo (D)
▌22. Jonathan Brewster Bingham (D)
▌23. Peter A. Peyser (R)
▌24. Ogden Reid (D)
▌25. Hamilton Fish IV (R)
▌26. Benjamin Gilman (R)
▌27. Howard W. Robison (R)
▌28. Samuel S. Stratton (D)
▌29. Carleton J. King (R), until December 31, 1974
▌30. Robert C. McEwen (R)
▌31. Donald J. Mitchell (R)
▌32. James M. Hanley (D)
▌33. William F. Walsh (R)
▌34. Frank Horton (R)
▌35. Barber Conable (R)
▌36. Henry P. Smith III (R)
▌37. Thaddeus J. Dulski (D), until December 31, 1974
▌38. Jack Kemp (R)
▌39. James F. Hastings (R)

==== North Carolina ====
▌1. Walter B. Jones Sr. (D)
▌2. Lawrence H. Fountain (D)
▌3. David N. Henderson (D)
▌4. Ike Franklin Andrews (D)
▌5. Wilmer Mizell (R)
▌6. L. Richardson Preyer (D)
▌7. Charlie Rose (D)
▌8. Earl B. Ruth (R)
▌9. James G. Martin (R)
▌10. Jim Broyhill (R)
▌11. Roy A. Taylor (D)

==== North Dakota ====
▌At-large. Mark Andrews (R)

==== Ohio ====
▌1. William J. Keating (R), until January 3, 1974

▌Tom Luken (D), from March 5, 1974

▌2. Donald D. Clancy (R)
▌3. Charles W. Whalen Jr. (R)
▌4. Tennyson Guyer (R)
▌5. Del Latta (R)
▌6. Bill Harsha (R)
▌7. Bud Brown (R)
▌8. Walter E. Powell (R)
▌9. Thomas L. Ashley (D)
▌10. Clarence E. Miller (R)
▌11. J. William Stanton (R)
▌12. Samuel L. Devine (R)
▌13. Charles Adams Mosher (R)
▌14. John F. Seiberling (D)
▌15. Chalmers Wylie (R)
▌16. Ralph Regula (R)
▌17. John M. Ashbrook (R)
▌18. Wayne Hays (D)
▌19. Charles J. Carney (D)
▌20. James V. Stanton (D)
▌21. Louis Stokes (D)
▌22. Charles Vanik (D)
▌23. William Edwin Minshall Jr. (R), until December 31, 1974

==== Oklahoma ====
▌1. James R. Jones (D)
▌2. Clem McSpadden (D)
▌3. Carl Albert (D)
▌4. Tom Steed (D)
▌5. John Jarman (D)
▌6. John Newbold Camp (R)

==== Oregon ====
▌1. Wendell Wyatt (R)
▌2. Al Ullman (D)
▌3. Edith Green (D), until December 31, 1974
▌4. John R. Dellenback (R)

==== Pennsylvania ====
▌1. William A. Barrett (D)
▌2. Robert N. C. Nix Sr. (D)
▌3. William J. Green III (D)
▌4. Joshua Eilberg (D)
▌5. John H. Ware III (R)
▌6. Gus Yatron (D)
▌7. Lawrence G. Williams (R)
▌8. Edward G. Biester Jr. (R)
▌9. Bud Shuster (R)
▌10. Joseph M. McDade (R)
▌11. Dan Flood (D)
▌12. John P. Saylor (R), until October 28, 1973

▌John Murtha (D), from February 5, 1974

▌13. Lawrence Coughlin (R)
▌14. William S. Moorhead (D)
▌15. Fred B. Rooney (D)
▌16. Edwin Duing Eshleman (R)
▌17. Herman T. Schneebeli (R)
▌18. John Heinz (R)
▌19. George Atlee Goodling (R)
▌20. Joseph M. Gaydos (D)
▌21. John Herman Dent (D)
▌22. Thomas E. Morgan (D)
▌23. Albert W. Johnson (R)
▌24. Joseph P. Vigorito (D)
▌25. Frank M. Clark (D), until December 31, 1974

==== Rhode Island ====
▌1. Fernand St Germain (D)
▌2. Robert Tiernan (D)

==== South Carolina ====
▌1. Mendel Jackson Davis (D)
▌2. Floyd Spence (R)
▌3. William Jennings Bryan Dorn (D), until December 31, 1974
▌4. James Mann (D)
▌5. Thomas S. Gettys (D), until December 31, 1974
▌6. Edward Lunn Young (R)

==== South Dakota ====
▌1. Frank E. Denholm (D)
▌2. James Abdnor (R)

==== Tennessee ====
▌1. Jimmy Quillen (R)
▌2. John Duncan Sr. (R)
▌3. LaMar Baker (R)
▌4. Joe L. Evins (D)
▌5. Richard Fulton (D)
▌6. Robin Beard (R)
▌7. Ed Jones (D)
▌8. Dan Kuykendall (R)

==== Texas ====
▌1. Wright Patman (D)
▌2. Charlie Wilson (D)
▌3. James M. Collins (R)
▌4. Ray Roberts (D)
▌5. Alan Steelman (R)
▌6. Olin E. Teague (D)
▌7. Bill Archer (R)
▌8. Robert C. Eckhardt (D)
▌9. Jack Brooks (D)
▌10. J. J. Pickle (D)
▌11. William R. Poage (D)
▌12. Jim Wright (D)
▌13. Bob Price (R)
▌14. John Andrew Young (D)
▌15. Kika de la Garza (D)
▌16. Richard Crawford White (D)
▌17. Omar Burleson (D)
▌18. Barbara Jordan (D)
▌19. George H. Mahon (D)
▌20. Henry B. González (D)
▌21. O. C. Fisher (D), until December 31, 1974
▌22. Robert R. Casey (D)
▌23. Abraham Kazen (D)
▌24. Dale Milford (D)

==== Utah ====
▌1. K. Gunn McKay (D)
▌2. Wayne Owens (D)

==== Vermont ====
▌At-large. Richard W. Mallary (R)

==== Virginia ====
▌1. Thomas N. Downing (D)
▌2. G. William Whitehurst (R)
▌3. David E. Satterfield III (D)
▌4. Robert Daniel (R)
▌5. Dan Daniel (D)
▌6. M. Caldwell Butler (R)
▌7. J. Kenneth Robinson (R)
▌8. Stanford Parris (R)
▌9. William C. Wampler (R)
▌10. Joel Broyhill (R), until December 31, 1974

==== Washington ====
▌1. Joel Pritchard (R)
▌2. Lloyd Meeds (D)
▌3. Julia Butler Hansen (D), until December 31, 1974
▌4. Mike McCormack (D)
▌5. Tom Foley (D)
▌6. Floyd Hicks (D)
▌7. Brock Adams (D)

==== West Virginia ====
▌1. Bob Mollohan (D)
▌2. Harley Orrin Staggers (D)
▌3. John M. Slack Jr. (D)
▌4. Ken Hechler (D)

==== Wisconsin ====
▌1. Les Aspin (D)
▌2. Robert Kastenmeier (D)
▌3. Vernon Wallace Thomson (R), until December 31, 1974
▌4. Clement J. Zablocki (D)
▌5. Henry S. Reuss (D)
▌6. William A. Steiger (R)
▌7. Dave Obey (D)
▌8. Harold Vernon Froehlich (R)
▌9. Glenn Robert Davis (R), until December 31, 1974

==== Wyoming ====
▌At-large. Teno Roncalio (D)

==== Non-voting members ====
▌District of Columbia. Walter Fauntroy (D)
▌Guam. Antonio Borja Won Pat (D)
▌Puerto Rico. Jaime Benítez Rexach (Resident Commissioner) (PPD)
▌U.S. Virgin Islands. Ron de Lugo (D)

House majority leadership

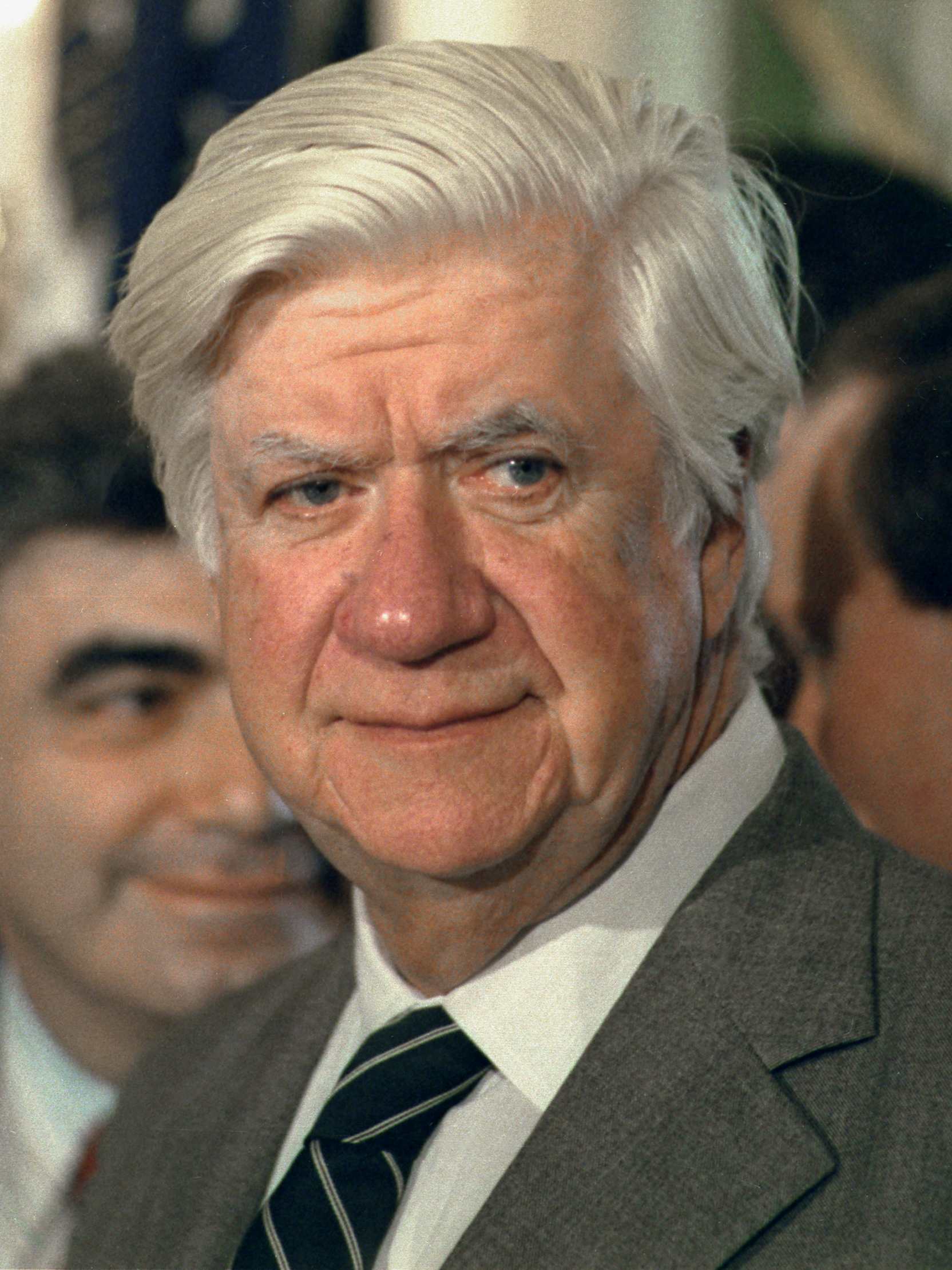
Democratic leader
Tip O'Neill

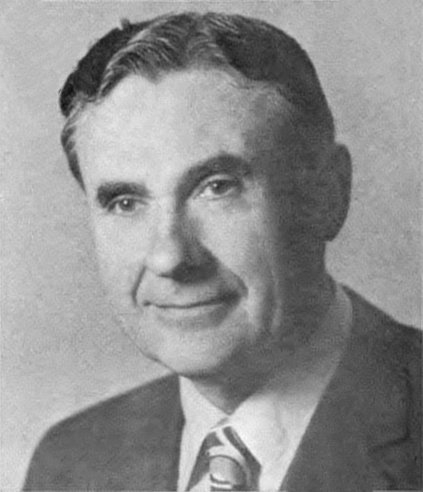
Democratic whip
John J. McFall

House minority leadership

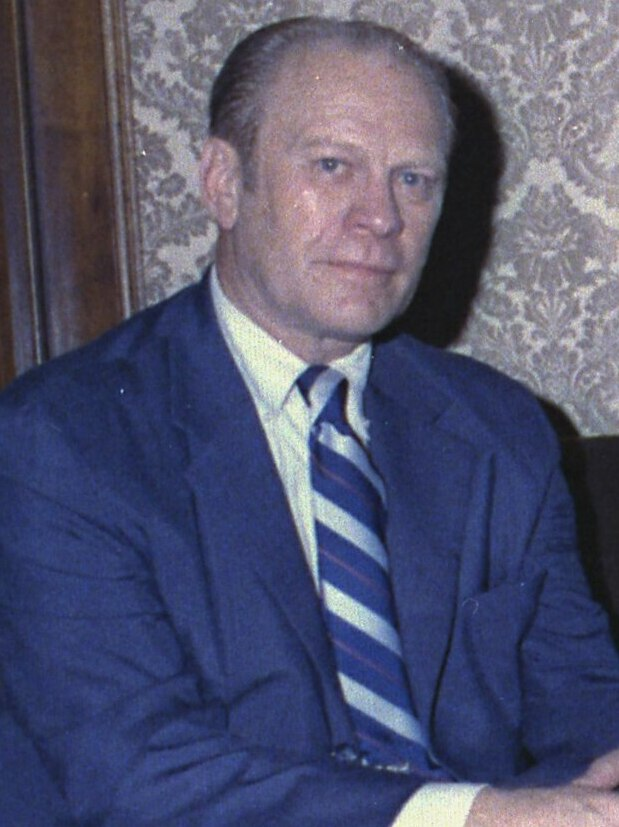
Republican leader (until December 6, 1973)
Gerald Ford

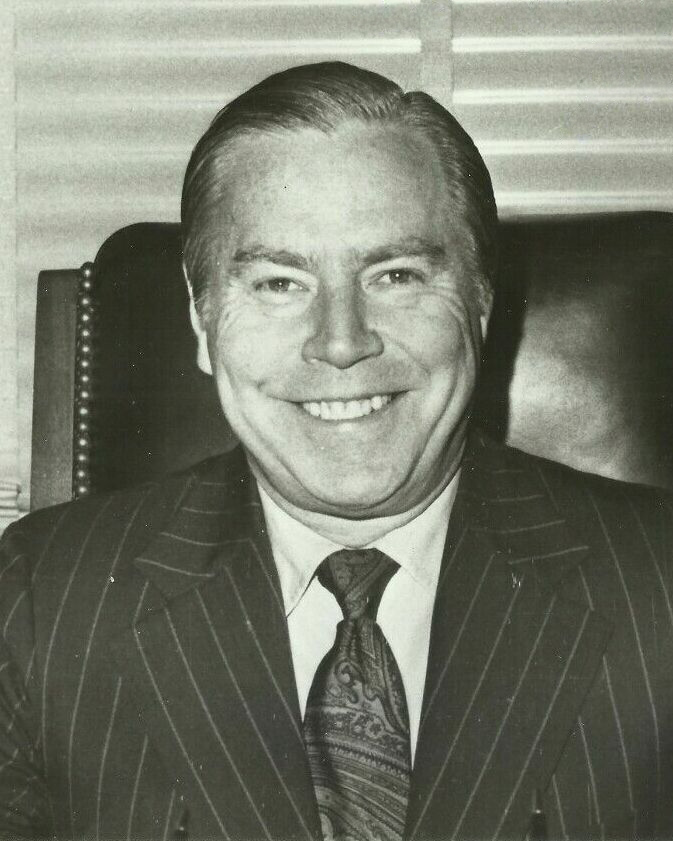
Republican leader (after December 7, 1973)
John Jacob Rhodes

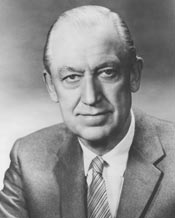
Republican whip
Leslie C. Arends

== Changes in membership ==
=== Senate ===
Senate changes
| State (class) | Vacated by | Reason for change | Successor | Date of successor's formal installation (Note: When seated or oath administered, not necessarily when service began.) |
|---|---|---|---|---|
| Ohio (3) | William B. Saxbe (R) | Resigned January 3, 1974, to become Attorney General. Successor appointed January 4, 1974 to finish the term. | Howard Metzenbaum (D) | January 4, 1974 |
| Nevada (3) | Alan Bible (D) | Resigned December 17, 1974, to give successor preferential seniority. Successor appointed December 18, 1974, having already been elected to the next term. | Paul Laxalt (R) | December 18, 1974 |
| Utah (3) | Wallace F. Bennett (R) | Resigned December 20, 1974, to give successor preferential seniority. Successor appointed December 21, 1974, having already been elected to the next term. | Jake Garn (R) | December 21, 1974 |
| Ohio (3) | Howard Metzenbaum (D) | Resigned December 23, 1974, to give successor preferential seniority. Successor appointed December 24, 1974, having already been elected to the next term. | John Glenn (D) | December 24, 1974 |
| Kentucky (3) | Marlow Cook (R) | Resigned December 27, 1974, to give successor preferential seniority. Successor appointed December 28, 1974, having already been elected to the next term. | Wendell Ford (D) | December 28, 1974 |
| New Hampshire (3) | Norris Cotton (R) | Resigned December 31, 1974, to give successor preferential seniority. Successor appointed December 31, 1974, having already been elected to the next term. | Louis C. Wyman (R) | December 31, 1974 |
| Florida (3) | Edward Gurney (R) | Resigned December 31, 1974, in an influence peddling scandal. Successor appointed January 1, 1975, having already been elected to the next term. | Richard Stone (D) | January 1, 1975 |
| Arkansas (3) | J. William Fulbright (D) | Resigned December 31, 1974. Successor began next term. | Vacant | Not filled this Congress |
| North Carolina (3) | Sam Ervin (D) | Resigned December 31, 1974. Successor began next term. | Vacant | Not filled this Congress |

=== House of Representatives ===
There were three deaths before this Congress began.

House changes
| District | Vacated by | Reason for change | Successor | Date of successor's formal installation |
|---|---|---|---|---|
| Illinois 7th | Vacant | Rep. George W. Collins (D) died during previous congress. | Cardiss Collins (D) | June 5, 1973 |
| Alaska at-large | Vacant | Nick Begich (D) and Hale Boggs (D) were lost in a plane crash, and the estate of Rep. Begich was issued a presumptive death certificate from the State of Alaska during previous congress. Both were also declared dead pursuant to H. R. Res. 1 issued January 3, 1973. | Don Young (R) | March 6, 1973 |
| Louisiana 2nd | Hale Boggs (D) | Nick Begich (D) and Hale Boggs (D) were lost in a plane crash during previous congress. Both were declared dead pursuant to H. R. Res. 1 issued January 3, 1973. | Lindy Boggs (D) | March 20, 1973 |
| Michigan 7th | Donald Riegle (R) | Switched party affiliation. | Donald Riegle (D) | February 27, 1973 |
| Maryland 1st | William Oswald Mills (R) | Committed suicide May 24, 1973. | Robert Bauman (R) | August 21, 1973 |
| Pennsylvania 12th | John P. Saylor (R) | Died October 28, 1973. | John Murtha (D) | February 5, 1974 |
| Michigan 5th | Gerald Ford (R) | Resigned December 6, 1973, to become vice president. | Richard Vander Veen (D) | February 18, 1974 |
| California 13th | Charles M. Teague (R) | Died January 1, 1974. | Robert J. Lagomarsino (R) | March 5, 1974 |
| Ohio 1st | William J. Keating (R) | Resigned January 3, 1974. | Tom Luken (D) | March 5, 1974 |
| Michigan 8th | R. James Harvey (R) | Resigned January 31, 1974, after being appointed as a judge of the US District Court of the Eastern District of Michigan. | J. Bob Traxler (D) | April 23, 1974 |
| California 6th | William S. Mailliard (R) | Resigned March 5, 1974. | John Burton (D) | June 4, 1974 |
| California 10th | Charles Gubser (R) | Resigned December 31, 1974. | Remained vacant until next Congress | |
| California 19th | Chester E. Holifield (D) | Resigned December 31, 1974. | Remained vacant until next Congress | |
| California 32nd | Craig Hosmer (R) | Resigned December 31, 1974. | Remained vacant until next Congress | |
| California 34th | Richard T. Hanna (D) | Resigned December 31, 1974. | Remained vacant until next Congress | |
| Illinois 15th | Leslie C. Arends (R) | Resigned December 31, 1974. | Remained vacant until next Congress | |
| Illinois 24th | Kenneth J. Gray (D) | Resigned December 31, 1974. | Remained vacant until next Congress | |
| Kentucky 1st | Frank Stubblefield (D) | Resigned December 31, 1974. | Remained vacant until next Congress | |
| Massachusetts 3rd | Harold Donohue (D) | Resigned December 31, 1974. | Remained vacant until next Congress | |
| Michigan 6th | Charles E. Chamberlain (R) | Resigned December 31, 1974. | Remained vacant until next Congress | |
| Michigan 17th | Martha Griffiths (D) | Resigned December 31, 1974. | Remained vacant until next Congress | |
| Minnesota 2nd | Ancher Nelsen (R) | Resigned December 31, 1974. | Remained vacant until next Congress | |
| Minnesota 8th | John Blatnik (DFL) | Resigned December 31, 1974. | Remained vacant until next Congress | |
| Nebraska 3rd | David Martin (R) | Resigned December 31, 1974. | Remained vacant until next Congress | |
| New Hampshire 1st | Louis C. Wyman (R) | Resigned December 31, 1974, after being appointed to the U.S. Senate. | Remained vacant until next Congress | |
| New Jersey 7th | William B. Widnall (R) | Resigned December 31, 1974. | Remained vacant until next Congress | |
| New York 14th | John J. Rooney (D) | Resigned December 31, 1974. | Remained vacant until next Congress | |
| New York 15th | Hugh Carey (D) | Resigned December 31, 1974. Inaugurated as Governor of New York the next day. | Remained vacant until next Congress | |
| New York 29th | Carleton J. King (R) | Resigned December 31, 1974. | Remained vacant until next Congress | |
| New York 37th | Thaddeus J. Dulski (D) | Resigned December 31, 1974. | Remained vacant until next Congress | |
| Ohio 23rd | William Edwin Minshall Jr. (R) | Resigned December 31, 1974. | Remained vacant until next Congress | |
| Oregon 3rd | Edith Green (D) | Resigned December 31, 1974. | Remained vacant until next Congress | |
| Pennsylvania 25th | Frank M. Clark (D) | Resigned December 31, 1974. | Remained vacant until next Congress | |
| South Carolina 3rd | William Jennings Bryan Dorn (D) | Resigned December 31, 1974. | Remained vacant until next Congress | |
| South Carolina 5th | Thomas S. Gettys (D) | Resigned December 31, 1974. | Remained vacant until next Congress | |
| Texas 21st | O. C. Fisher (D) | Resigned December 31, 1974. | Remained vacant until next Congress | |
| Virginia 10th | Joel Broyhill (R) | Resigned December 31, 1974, after being defeated for re-election. | Remained vacant until next Congress | |
| Washington 3rd | Julia Butler Hansen (D) | Resigned December 31, 1974. | Remained vacant until next Congress | |
| Wisconsin 3rd | Vernon Wallace Thomson (R) | Resigned December 31, 1974. | Remained vacant until next Congress | |
| Wisconsin 9th | Glenn Robert Davis (R) | Resigned December 31, 1974 . | | |

== Committees ==
Lists of committees and their party leaders for members of the House and Senate committees can be found through the Official Congressional Directory at the bottom of this article. The directory after the pages of terms of service lists committees of the Senate, House (Standing with Subcommittees, Select and Special) and Joint and, after that, House/Senate committee assignments. On the committees section of the House and Senate in the Official Congressional Directory, the committee's members on the first row on the left side shows the chairman of the committee and on the right side shows the ranking member of the committee.

=== Senate ===
- Aging (Special) (Chair: Frank Church)
- Aeronautical and Space Sciences (Chair: Frank Moss; Ranking Member: Barry Goldwater)
- Agriculture and Forestry (Chair: Herman Talmadge; Ranking Member: Carl T. Curtis)
  - Environment, Soil Conservation and Forestry (Chair: James Eastland; Ranking Member: Jesse Helms)
  - Agriculture Credit and Rural Electrification (Chair: George McGovern; Ranking Member: George D. Aiken)
  - Agricultural Production, Marketing and Stabilization of Prices (Chair: Walter "Dee" Huddleston; Ranking Member: Milton R. Young)
  - Agricultural Research and General Legislation (Chair: James Allen; Ranking Member: Bob Dole)
  - Rural Development (Chair: Dick Clark; Ranking Member: Carl T. Curtis)
  - Foreign Agricultural Policy (Chair: Hubert Humphrey; Ranking Member: Henry Bellmon)
- Appropriations (Chair: John L. McClellan; Ranking Member: Milton Young)
  - Agriculture, Environmental and Consumer Protection (Chair: Gale W. McGee; Ranking Member: Hiram L. Fong)
  - Defense (Chair: John L. McClellan; Ranking Member: Milton R. Young)
  - Intelligence Operations (Chair: John L. McClellan; Ranking Member: Milton R. Young)
  - District of Columbia (Chair: Birch Bayh; Ranking Member: Charles Mathias)
  - Foreign Operations (Chair: Daniel Inouye; Ranking Member: Edward W. Brooke)
  - Housing and Urban Development, Space, Science and Veterans (Chair: William Proxmire; Ranking Member: Charles Mathias)
  - Interior (Chair: Alan Bible; Ranking Member: Ted Stevens)
  - Labor, Health, Education and Welfare (Chair: Warren Magnuson; Ranking Member: Norris Cotton)
  - Legislative (Chair: Fritz Hollings; Ranking Member: Norris Cotton)
  - Military Construction (Chair: Mike Mansfield; Ranking Member: Richard S. Schweiker)
  - Public Works, AEC (Chair: John C. Stennis; Ranking Member: Mark O. Hatfield)
  - State, Justice, Commerce and the Judiciary (Chair: John Pastore; Ranking Member: Roman L. Hruska)
  - Transportation (Chair: Robert Byrd; Ranking Member: Clifford P. Case)
  - Treasury, U.S. Postal Service and General Government (Chair: Joseph Montoya; Ranking Member: Henry Bellmon)
- Armed Services (Chair: John C. Stennis; Ranking Member: Strom Thurmond)
  - Central Intelligence (Chair: John C. Stennis; Ranking Member: Peter H. Dominick)
  - Preparedness Investigating (Chair: John C. Stennis; Ranking Member: Strom Thurmond)
  - National Stockfile and Naval Petroleum Reserves (Chair: Howard Cannon; Ranking Member: William L. Scott)
  - Status of Forces (Chair: Sam Ervin; Ranking Member: William L. Scott)
  - Military Construction Authorization (Chair: Stuart Symington; Ranking Member: John Tower)
  - Arms Control (Chair: Henry M. Jackson; Ranking Member: Barry Goldwater)
  - Nuclear Test Ban Treaty Safeguards (Chair: Henry M. Jackson; Ranking Member: William B. Saxbe)
  - Tactical Air Power (Chair: Howard Cannon; Ranking Member: Barry Goldwater)
  - Research and Development (Chair: Thomas J. McIntyre; Ranking Member: Peter H. Dominick)
  - General Legislation (Chair: Harry F. Byrd Jr.; Ranking Member: William B. Saxbe)
  - Reprograming of Funds (Chair: John C. Stennis; Ranking Member: John G. Tower)
  - Drug Abuse in the Military (Chair: Harold Hughes; Ranking Member: Peter H. Dominick)
- Banking, Housing and Urban Affairs (Chair: John Sparkman; Ranking Member: John G. Tower)
  - Consumer Credit (Chair: William Proxmire; Ranking Member: Bill Brock)
  - Financial Institutions (Chair: John C. Stennis; Ranking Member: Wallace F. Bennett)
  - Housing (Chair: John J. Sparkman; Ranking Member: John G. Tower)
  - International Finance (Chair: Adlai Stevenson III; Ranking Member: Bob Packwood)
  - Production and Stabilization (Chair: J. Bennett Johnston; Ranking Member: Robert Taft Jr.)
  - Securities (Chair: Harrison A. Williams; Ranking Member: Edward W. Brooke)
  - Small Business (Chair: Alan Cranston; Ranking Member: Lowell P. Weicker)
- Commerce (Chair: Warren Magnuson; Ranking Member: Norris Cotton)
  - Aviation (Chair: Howard Cannon; Ranking Member: Norris Cotton)
  - Communications (Chair: Frank Moss; Ranking Member: Howard H. Baker Jr.)
  - Consumer (Chair: Frank Moss; Ranking Member: Marlow W. Cook)
  - Environment (Chair: Philip Hart; Ranking Member: Marlow W. Cook)
  - Foreign Commerce and Tourism (Chair: Daniel Inouye; Ranking Member: Robert P. Griffin)
  - Merchant Marine (Chair: Russell B. Long; Ranking Member: J. Glenn Beall Jr.)
  - Oceans and Atmosphere (Chair: Fritz Hollings; Ranking Member: Ted Stevens)
  - Surface and Transportation (Chair: Vance Hartke; Ranking Member: James B. Pearson)
- District of Columbia (Chair: Thomas Eagleton; Ranking Member: Charles Mathias)
  - Business, Commerce and Judiciary (Chair: Adlai Stevenson III; Ranking Member: Pete V. Domenici)
  - Fiscal Affairs (Chair: Thomas Eagleton; Ranking Member: Dewey F. Bartlett)
  - Public Health, Education, Welfare and Safety (Chair: John V. Tunney; Ranking Member: Charles Mathias)
- Finance (Chair: Abraham Ribicoff; Ranking Member: Wallace F. Bennett)
  - International Trade (Chair: Abraham Ribicoff; Ranking Member: Paul Fannin)
  - Health (Chair: Herman Talmadge; Ranking Member: Clifford P. Hansen)
  - Private Pension Plans (Chair: Gaylord Nelson; Ranking Member: Carl T. Curtis)
  - State Taxation of Interstate Commerce (Chair: Walter Mondale; Ranking Member: Clifford P. Hansen)
  - Foundations (Chair: Vance Hartke; Ranking Member: Carl T. Curtis)
  - International Finance and Resource (Chair: Harry F. Byrd Jr.; Ranking Member: Bob Dole)
- Foreign Relations (Chair: J. William Fulbright; Ranking Member: George D. Aiken)
  - Near Eastern Affairs (Chair: J. William Fulbright; Ranking Member: George D. Aiken)
  - European Affairs (Chair: John Sparkman; Ranking Member: Clifford P. Case)
  - Far Eastern Affairs (Chair: Mike Mansfield; Ranking Member: George D. Aiken)
  - Oceans and International Environment (Chair: Claiborne Pell; Ranking Member: Clifford P. Case)
  - Western Hemisphere Affairs (Chair: Gale W. McGee; Ranking Member: George D. Aiken)
  - Arms Control, International Law and Organization (Chair: Edmund Muskie; Ranking Member: Clifford P. Case)
  - South Asian Affairs (Chair: George McGovern; Ranking Member: Charles H. Percy)
  - African Affairs (Chair: Hubert Humphrey; Ranking Member: James B. Pearson)
  - U.S. Security Agreements and Commitments Aboard (Chair: Stuart Symington; Ranking Member: George D. Aiken)
  - Multinational Corporations (Chair: Frank Church; Ranking Member: Frank Church)
- Government Operations (Chair: Sam Ervin; Ranking Member: Charles H. Percy)
  - Permanent Investigations (Chair: Henry M. Jackson; Ranking Member: Charles H. Percy)
  - Intergovernmental Relations (Chair: Edmund Muskie; Ranking Member: Edward J. Gurney)
  - Reorganization, Research and International Organizations (Chair: Abraham Ribicoff; Ranking Member: Jacob K. Javits)
  - Budgeting, Management and Expenditures (Chair: Lee Metcalf; Ranking Member: William B. Saxbe)
  - Surplus Property (Ad Hoc) (Chair: James Allen; Ranking Member: Edward J. Gurney)
  - Inpoundment of Funds (Ad Hoc) (Chair: Lawton Chiles; Ranking Member: Charles H. Percy)
  - Procurement (Ad Hoc) (Chair: Lawton Chiles; Ranking Member: William V. Roth Jr.)
- Interior and Insular Affairs (Chair: Henry M. Jackson; Ranking Member: Paul J. Fannin)
  - Indian Affairs (Chair: James Abourezk; Ranking Member: Dewey F. Bartlett)
  - Minerals, Materials and Fuels (Chair: Lee Metcalf; Ranking Member: James L. Buckley)
  - Parks and Recreation (Chair: Alan Bible; Ranking Member: Clifford P. Hansen)
  - Public Lands (Chair: Floyd Haskell; Ranking Member: James A. McClure)
  - Territories and Insular Affairs (Chair: J. Bennett Johnston; Ranking Member: Paul J. Fannin)
  - Water and Power Resources (Chair: Frank Church; Ranking Member: Mark O. Hatfield)
- Judiciary (Chair: James Eastland; Ranking Member: Roman L. Hruska)
  - Administrative Practice and Procedure (Chair: Ted Kennedy; Ranking Member: Strom Thurmond)
  - Antitrust Monopoly (Chair: Philip Hart; Ranking Member: Roman L. Hruska)
  - Constitutional Amendments (Chair: Birch Bayh; Ranking Member: Marlow W. Cook)
  - Constitutional Rights (Chair: Sam Ervin; Ranking Member: Edward J. Gurney)
  - Criminal Laws and Procedures (Chair: John L. McClellan; Ranking Member: Roman L. Hruska)
  - FBI Oversight (Chair: James O. Eastland; Ranking Member: Roman L. Hruska)
  - Federal Charters, Holidays and Celebrations (Chair: James Eastland; Ranking Member: John L. McClellan)
  - Immigration and Naturalization (Chair: James Eastland; Ranking Member: Hiram L. Fong)
  - Improvements in Judicial Machinery (Chair: Quentin Burdick; Ranking Member: Roman Hruska)
  - Internal Security (Chair: James Eastland; Ranking Member: Hugh Scott)
  - Juvenile Delinquency (Chair: Birch Bayh; Ranking Member: Marlow Cook)
  - Patents, Trademarks and Copyrights (Chair: John L. McClellan; Ranking Member: Hugh Scott)
  - Penitentiaries (Chair: Quentin Burdick; Ranking Member: Marlow W. Cook)
  - Rufugees and Escapees (Chair: Ted Kennedy; Ranking Member: Hiram L. Fong)
  - Revision and Codification (Chair: Sam Ervin; Ranking Member: Hugh Scott)
  - Separation of Powers (Chair: Sam Ervin; Ranking Member: Charles Mathias)
- Labor and Public Welfare (Chair: Harrison A. Williams; Ranking Member: Jacob K. Javits)
  - Labor (Chair: Harrison A. Williams; Ranking Member: Jacob K. Javits)
  - Handicapped Workers (Chair: Jennings Randolph; Ranking Member: Robert T. Stafford)
  - Education (Chair: Claiborne Pell; Ranking Member: Peter H. Dominick)
  - Health (Chair: Ted Kennedy; Ranking Member: Richard S. Schweiker)
  - Employment, Poverty and Migratory Labor (Chair: Gaylord Nelson; Ranking Member: Robert Taft Jr.)
  - Children and Youth (Chair: Walter Mondale; Ranking Member: Robert Taft Jr.)
  - Aging (Chair: Thomas Eagleton; Ranking Member: J. Glenn Beall Jr.)
  - Railroad Retirement (Chair: William Hathaway; Ranking Member: Richard S. Schweiker)
  - Alcoholism and Narcotics (Chair: Harold Hughes; Ranking Member: Richard S. Schweiker)
  - Arts and Humanities (Chair: Claiborne Pell; Ranking Member: Jacob K. Javits)
  - National Science Foundation (Chair: Ted Kennedy; Ranking Member: Peter H. Dominick)
  - Human Resources (Chair: Alan Cranston; Ranking Member: J. Glenn Beall Jr.)
- Nutrition and Human Needs (Select) (Chair: George McGovern)
- Post Office and Civil Service (Chair: Gale W. McGee; Ranking Member: Hiram L. Fong)
  - Civil Service Policies and Practices (Chair: Jennings Randolph; Ranking Member: Henry Bellmon)
  - Compensation and Employment Benefits (Chair: Quentin Burdick; Ranking Member: Ted Stevens)
  - Postal Operations (Chair: Fritz Hollings; Ranking Member: William B. Saxbe)
- Presidential Campaign Activities (Select) (Chair: Sam J. Ervin Jr.)
- Public Works (Chair: Jennings Randolph; Ranking Member: Howard H. Baker Jr.)
  - Air and Water Pollution (Chair: Edmund Muskie; Ranking Member: James L. Buckley)
  - Economic Development (Chair: Joseph Montoya; Ranking Member: James A. McClure)
  - Water Resources (Chair: Mike Gravel; Ranking Member: William L. Scott)
  - Roads (Chair: Lloyd Bentsen; Ranking Member: Robert T. Stafford)
  - Disaster Relief (Chair: Quentin Burdick; Ranking Member: Pete Domenici)
  - Buildings and Grounds (Chair: Dick Clark; Ranking Member: William L. Scott)
- Rules and Administration (Chair: Howard Cannon; Ranking Member: Marlow W. Cook)
  - Standing Rules of the Senate (Chair: Robert Byrd; Ranking Member: Robert P. Griffin)
  - Privileges and Elections (Chair: Claiborne Pell; Ranking Member: Mark O. Hatfield)
  - Printing (Chair: Howard Cannon; Ranking Member: Hugh Scott)
  - Library (Chair: Howard Cannon; Ranking Member: Mark O. Hatfield)
  - Smithsonian Institution (Chair: James Allen; Ranking Member: Marlow W. Cook)
  - Restaurant (Chair: James Allen; Ranking Member: Marlow W. Cook)
  - Computer Services (Chair: Howard Cannon; Ranking Member: Mark O. Hatfield)
- Secret and Confidential Government Documents (Special) (Chair: [data missing])
- Small Business (Select) (Chair: Alan Bible)
- Standards and Conduct (Select) (Chair: Frank Church)
- Termination of the National Emergency (Special) (Chair: Frank Church)
- Veterans' Affairs (Chair: Vance Hartke; Ranking Member: Clifford P. Hansen)
  - Housing and Insurance (Chair: Harold Hughes; Ranking Member: James A. McClure)
  - Readjustment, Education and Employment (Chair: Vance Hartke; Ranking Member: Robert T. Stafford)
  - Health and Hospitals (Chair: Alan Cranston; Ranking Member: Strom Thurmond)
  - Compensation and Pensions (Chair: Herman Talmadge; Ranking Member: Clifford P. Hansen)
- Whole

=== House of Representatives ===
- Agriculture (Chair: William R. Poage; Ranking Member: Charles M. Teague)
  - Cotton (Chair: B. F. Sisk; Ranking Member: Robert B. Mathias)
  - Dairy and Poultry (Chair: Ed Jones; Ranking Member: William C. Wampler)
  - Forests (Chair: John Rarick; Ranking Member: George A. Goodling)
  - Livestock and Grains (Chair: Tom Foley; Ranking Member: Wiley Mayne)
  - Oilseeds and Rice (Chair: Walter B. Jones Sr.; Ranking Member: William C. Wampler)
  - Tobacco (Chair: Frank Stubblefield; Ranking Member: Wilmer Mizell)
  - Conservation and Credit (Chair: William R. Poage; Ranking Member: John M. Zwach)
  - Domestic Marketing and Consumer Relations (Chair: Joseph P. Vigorito; Ranking Member: George A. Goodling)
  - Department Operations (Chair: Kika de la Garza; Ranking Member: Bob Price)
  - Family Farms and Rural Development (Chair: William Vollie Alexander Jr.; Ranking Member: Keith G. Sebelius)
- Appropriations (Chair: George H. Mahon; Ranking Member: Elford A. Cederberg)
  - Agriculture, Environmental and Consumer Protection (Chair: Jamie Whitten; Ranking Member: Mark Andrews)
  - Defense (Chair: George H. Mahon; Ranking Member: William E. Minshall)
  - District of Columbia (Chair: William Natcher; Ranking Member: John T. Myers)
  - Foreign Operations (Chair: Otto Passman; Ranking Member: Garner E. Shriver)
  - Housing and Urban Development/Space, Science and Veterans (Chair: Edward Boland; Ranking Member: Burt L. Talcott)
  - Interior (Chair: Julia Butler Hansen; Ranking Member: Joseph M. McDade)
  - Labor, Health, Education and Welfare (Chair: Dan Flood; Ranking Member: Robert H. Michel)
  - Legislative (Chair: Robert R. Casey; Ranking Member: Louis C. Wyman)
  - Military Construction (Chair: Bob Sikes; Ranking Member: Robert C. McEwen)
  - Public Works (Chair: Joe L. Evins; Ranking Member: Glenn Robert Davis)
  - State, Justice, Commerce and Judiciary (Chair: John J. Rooney; Ranking Member: Elford A. Cederberg)
  - Transportation (Chair: John J. Rooney; Ranking Member: Silvio O. Conte)
  - Treasury, Postal Service and General Government (Chair: Tom Steed; Ranking Member: Howard W. Robison)
- Armed Services (Chair: F. Edward Hébert; Ranking Member: William G. Bray)
  - Subcommittee No.#1 (Chair: Melvin Price; Ranking Member: Charles S. Gubser)
  - Subcommittee No.#2 (Chair: O. C. Fisher; Ranking Member: William L. Dickinson)
  - Subcommittee No.#3 (Chair: Charles E. Bennett; Ranking Member: Bob Wilson)
  - Subcommittee No.#4 (Chair: Samuel S. Stratton; Ranking Member: John E. Hunt)
  - Subcommittee No.#5 (Chair: Otis G. Pike; Ranking Member: Carleton J. King)
  - Intelligence (Chair: Lucien Nedzi; Ranking Member: William G. Bray)
  - Human Relations (Chair: Floyd Hicks; Ranking Member: John E. Hunt)
  - Armed Services Investigation (Chair: F. Edward Hébert; Ranking Member: Leslie C. Arends)
- Banking and Currency (Chair: Wright Patman; Ranking Member: William B. Widnall)
  - Domestic Finance (Chair: Wright Patman; Ranking Member: Phil Crane)
  - Housing (Chair: William A. Barrett; Ranking Member: William B. Widnall)
  - Consumer Affairs (Chair: Leonor Sullivan; Ranking Member: Chalmers P. Wylie)
  - International Trade (Chair: Thomas L. Ashley; Ranking Member: Benjamin B. Blackburn)
  - Small Business (Chair: Robert Grier Stephens Jr.; Ranking Member: J. William Stanton)
  - Bank Supervision and Insurance (Chair: Fernand St. Germain; Ranking Member: John H. Rousselot)
  - International Finance (Chair: Henry B. González; Ranking Member: Albert W. Johnson)
  - Urban Mass Transit (Chair: Joseph Minish; Ranking Member: Garry E. Brown)
- Crime (Select) (Chair: [data missing]; Ranking Member: [data missing])
- District of Columbia (Chair: Charles Diggs; Ranking Member: Ancher Nelsen)
  - Business, Commerce and Taxation (Chair: W. S. Stuckey Jr.; Ranking Member: Bill Harsha)
  - Education (Chair: Ron Dellums; Ranking Member: Stewart B. McKinney)
  - Government Operations (Chair: Brock Adams; Ranking Member: Earl F. Landgrebe)
  - Judiciary (Chair: Walter Fauntroy; Ranking Member: Henry P. Smith III)
  - Labor, Social Services and the International Community (Chair: Romano Mazzoli; Ranking Member: Gilbert Gude)
  - Revenue and Financial Services (Chair: Thomas M. Rees; Ranking Member: Joel T. Broyhill)
- Education and Labor (Chair: Carl D. Perkins; Ranking Member: Al Quie)
  - Education (Chair: Carl D. Perkins; Ranking Member: Alphonso Bell)
  - Labor (Chair: Frank Thompson; Ranking Member: John M. Ashbrook)
- Foreign Affairs (Chair: Thomas E. Morgan; Ranking Member: John N. Erlenborn)
  - National Security Policy and Scientific Developments (Chair: Clement J. Zablocki; Ranking Member: Marvin L. Esch)
  - State Department Organization and Foreign Operations (Chair: Wayne Hays; Ranking Member: Edwin D. Eshleman)
  - Inter-American Affairs (Chair: Dante Fascell; Ranking Member: Vernon W. Thomson)
  - Africa (Chair: Charles Diggs; Ranking Member: Edward J. Derwinski)
  - Asian and Pacific Affairs (Chair: Robert N. C. Nix Sr.; Ranking Member: William S. Broomfield)
  - International Organizations and Movements (Chair: Donald M. Fraser; Ranking Member: H. R. Gross)
  - Europe (Chair: Benjamin Stanley Rosenthal; Ranking Member: Peter Frelinghuysen)
  - Foreign Economic Policy (Chair: John Culver; Ranking Member: J. Herbert Burke)
  - Near East and South Asia (Chair: Lee H. Hamilton; Ranking Member: John H. Buchanan Jr.)
  - Foreign Aid Programs (Chair: Thomas E. Morgan; Ranking Member: William S. Mailliard)
- Government Operations (Chair: Chester E. Holifield; Ranking Member: Frank Horton)
  - Conservation and Natural Resources (Chair: Henry S. Reuss; Ranking Member: Guy Vander Jagt)
  - Foreign Operations and Government Information (Chair: William S. Moorhead; Ranking Member: John N. Erlenborn)
  - Government Activities (Chair: Jack Brooks; Ranking Member: John H. Buchanan Jr.)
  - Intergovernmental Relations (Chair: Lawrence H. Fountain; Ranking Member: Clarence J. Brown)
  - Legal and Monetary Affairs (Chair: William J. Randall; Ranking Member: Sam Steiger)
  - Legislation and Military Operations (Chair: Chester E. Holifield; Ranking Member: Frank Horton)
  - Special Studies (Chair: Floyd Hicks; Ranking Member: John W. Wydler)
- House Administration (Chair: Wayne Hays; Ranking Member: William L. Dickinson)
  - Accounts (Chair: Frank Thompson; Ranking Member: Samuel L. Devine)
  - Elections (Chair: John Herman Dent; Ranking Member: R. James Harvey)
  - Library and Memorials (Chair: Lucien Nedzi; Ranking Member: James C. Cleveland)
  - Printing (Chair: John Brademas; Ranking Member: James C. Cleveland)
  - Electrical and Mechanical Office Equipment (Chair: Augustus Hawkins; Ranking Member: R. James Harvey)
  - Contracts (Chair: Thomas S. Gettys; Ranking Member: James C. Cleveland)
  - Police (Chair: Kenneth J. Gray; Ranking Member: Samuel L. Devine)
  - Personnel (Chair: Frank Annunzio; Ranking Member: Phil Crane)
- House Beauty Shop (Select) (Chair: Martha W. Griffiths)
- House Restaurant (Select) (Chair: John C. Kluczynski)
- Interior and Insular Affairs (Chair: James A. Haley; Ranking Member: Craig Hosmer)
  - Environment (Chair: Mo Udall; Ranking Member: Philip E. Ruppe)
  - National Parks and Recreation (Chair: Roy A. Taylor; Ranking Member: Joe Skubitz)
  - Water and Power Resources (Chair: Harold T. Johnson; Ranking Member: Craig Hosmer)
  - Territorial and Insular Affairs (Chair: Phillip Burton; Ranking Member: Don H. Clausen)
  - Indian Affairs (Chair: Lloyd Meeds; Ranking Member: Manuel Lujan Jr.)
  - Mines and Mining (Chair: Patsy Mink; Ranking Member: John Newbold Camp)
  - Public Lands (Chair: John Melcher; Ranking Member: Sam Steiger)
- Internal Security (Chair: Richard Howard Ichord Jr.; Ranking Member: John M. Ashbrook)
- Interstate and Foreign Commerce (Chair: Harley Orrin Staggers; Ranking Member: Samuel L. Devine)
  - Commerce and Finance (Chair: John E. Moss; Ranking Member: Jim Broyhill)
  - Communications and Power (Chair: Torbert Macdonald; Ranking Member: Clarence J. Brown)
  - Public Health and Environment (Chair: Paul Rogers; Ranking Member: Ancher Nelsen)
  - Transportation and Aeronautics (Chair: John Jarman; Ranking Member: R. James Harvey)
  - Investigations (Chair: Harley Orrin Staggers; Ranking Member: Samuel L. Devine)
- Judiciary (Chair: Peter W. Rodino; Ranking Member: Edward Hutchinson)
  - Civil Rights and Constitutional Rights (Chair: Don Edwards; Ranking Member: Charles E. Wiggins)
  - Claims and Governmental Relations (Chair: Harold Donohue; Ranking Member: M. Caldwell Butler)
  - Courts, Civil Liberties and the Administration of Justice (Chair: Robert W. Kastenmeier; Ranking Member: M. Caldwell Butler)
  - Crime (Chair: John Conyers Jr.)
  - Criminal Justice (Chair: William L. Hungate; Ranking Member: Henry P. Smith III)
  - Immigration, Citizenship and International Law (Chair: Joshua Eilberg; Ranking Member: Hamilton Fish IV)
  - Monopolies and Commercial Law (Chair: Peter W. Rodino Jr.; Ranking Member: Edward Hutchinson)
- Merchant Marine and Fisheries (Chair: Leonor Sullivan; Ranking Member: James R. Grover Jr.)
  - Merchant Marine (Chair: Frank M. Clark; Ranking Member: William S. Mailliard)
  - Fisheries, Wildlife Conservation and the Environment (Chair: John Dingell; Ranking Member: George A. Goodling)
  - Coast Guard and Navigation (Chair: John M. Murphy; Ranking Member: Philip E. Ruppe)
  - Oceanography (Chair: Thomas N. Downing; Ranking Member: Charles A. Mosher)
  - Panama Canal (Chair: Robert L. Leggett; Ranking Member: Gene Snyder)
- Post Office and Civil Service (Chair: Thaddeus J. Dulski; Ranking Member: H.R. Gross)
  - Investigations (Chair: Thaddeus J. Dulski; Ranking Member: Walter E. Powell)
  - Postal Service (Chair: James M. Hanley; Ranking Member: Albert W. Johnson)
  - Retirement and Employee Benefits (Chair: Jerome Waldie; Ranking Member: Lawrence J. Hogan)
  - Manpower and Civil Service (Chair: David N. Henderson; Ranking Member: Edward J. Derwinski)
  - Postal Facilities, Mail and Labor Management (Chair: Charlie Wilson; Ranking Member: Elwood Hillis)
  - Census and Statistics (Chair: Richard Crawford White; Ranking Member: John H. Rousselot)
- Public Works (Chair: John Blatnik; Ranking Member: John H. Rousselot)
  - Water Resources (Chair: Ray Roberts; Ranking Member: Bill Harsha)
  - Transportation (Chair: John C. Kluczynski; Ranking Member: Don H. Clausen)
  - Public Buildings and Grounds (Chair: Kenneth J. Gray; Ranking Member: James R. Grover Jr.)
  - Economic Development (Chair: Robert E. Jones Jr.; Ranking Member: John Paul Hammerschmidt)
  - Investigations and Review (Chair: Jim Wright; Ranking Member: James C. Cleveland)
  - Energy (Chair: James J. Howard; Ranking Member: Gene Snyder)
- Regulate Parking (Select) (Chair: B. F. Sisk)
- Rules (Chair: Ray Madden; Ranking Member: David T. Martin)
- Science and Astronautics (Chair: Olin E. Teague; Ranking Member: Charles A. Mosher)
  - Aeronautics and Space Technology (Chair: Ray Madden; Ranking Member: John W. Wydler)
  - Science, Research and Development (Chair: John William Davis; Ranking Member: Alphonso Bell)
  - Manned Space Flight (Chair: Don Fuqua; Ranking Member: Larry Winn Jr.)
  - Space Science and Applications (Chair: James W. Symington; Ranking Member: Marvin L. Esch)
  - International Cooperation in Science and Space (Chair: Richard T. Hanna; Ranking Member: Louis Frey)
  - Energy (Chair: Mike McCormack; Ranking Member: Barry M. Goldwater)
- Standards of Official Conduct (Chair: Melvin Price; Ranking Member: Jimmy Quillen)
- Small Business (Select) (Chair: Joe L. Evins)
- Veterans' Affairs (Chair: William Jennings Bryan Dorn; Ranking Member: John Paul Hammerschmidt)
  - Compensation and Pension (Chair: Olin E. Teague; Ranking Member: John Paul Hammerschmidt)
  - Education and Training (Chair: Henry Helstoski; Ranking Member: Margaret M. Heckler)
  - Hospitals (Chair: David E. Satterfield III)
  - Housing (Chair: Charles J. Carney; Ranking Member: Elwood Hillis)
  - Insurance (Chair: Sonny Montgomery; Ranking Member: John M. Zwach)
  - Ways and Means (Chair: Wilbur Mills; Ranking Member: Herman T. Schneebeli)
- Whole

=== Joint committees ===
- Atomic Energy (Chair: Rep. Charles Melvin Price; Vice Chair: Sen. John O. Pastore)
- Congressional Operations (Chair: Sen. Lee Metcalf; Vice Chair: Rep. Jack Brooks)
- Defense Productions (Chair: Sen. John J. Sparkman; Vice Chair: Rep. Wright Patman)
- Economic (Chair: Rep. Wright Patman; Vice Chair: Sen. William Proxmire)
- Internal Revenue Taxation (Chair: Sen. Russell B. Long; Ranking Member: Rep. Wilbur D. Mills)
- The Library (Chair: Sen. Howard Cannon; Vice Chair: Rep. Lucien N. Nedzi)
- Printing (Chair: Rep. Wayne L. Hays; Vice Chair: Sen. Howard Cannon)
- Reduction of Federal Expenditures (Chair: Rep. George H. Mahon)
- Budget Control (Chair: Rep. Al Ullman)

== Employees ==
=== Legislative branch agency directors ===
- Architect of the Capitol: George Malcolm White
- Attending Physician of the United States Congress: Rufus Pearson, until 1974
  - Freeman H. Cary, starting 1974
- Comptroller General of the United States: Elmer B. Staats
- Librarian of Congress: Lawrence Quincy Mumford, until 1974
- Public Printer of the United States: Thomas F. McCormick, starting 1973

=== Senate ===
- Secretary: Francis R. Valeo
- Librarian: Roger K. Haley
- Parliamentarian: Floyd Riddick, until 1974
  - Murray Zweben, starting 1974
- Sergeant at Arms: William H. Wannall
- Chaplain: Edward L.R. Elson (Presbyterian)
- Curator: James R. Ketchum
- Democratic Party Secretary: J. Stanley Kimmitt
- Republican Party Secretary: J. Mark Trice, until 1974
  - William Hildenbrand, starting 1974

=== House of Representatives ===
- Chaplain: Edward G. Latch (Methodist)
- Clerk: W. Pat Jennings
- Doorkeeper: William M. Miller, until December 31, 1974
  - James T. Molloy, interim
- Parliamentarian: Lewis Deschler, until June 27, 1974
  - William Holmes Brown, appointed June 27, 1974
- Postmaster: Robert V. Rota
- Reading Clerk: Joe Bartlett (R) and Charles W. Hackney Jr. (D)
- Sergeant at Arms: Kenneth R. Harding

== See also ==
- List of new members of the 93rd United States Congress
- 1972 United States elections (elections leading to this Congress)
  - 1972 United States presidential election
  - 1972 United States Senate elections
  - 1972 United States House of Representatives elections
- 1974 United States elections (elections during this Congress, leading to the next Congress)
  - 1974 United States Senate elections
  - 1974 United States House of Representatives elections

== Footnotes ==
- Martis, Kenneth C. (1989). The Historical Atlas of Political Parties in the United States Congress. New York: Macmillan Publishing Company.
- Martis, Kenneth C. (1982). The Historical Atlas of United States Congressional Districts. New York: Macmillan Publishing Company.
