= Lewis Henry =

American politician

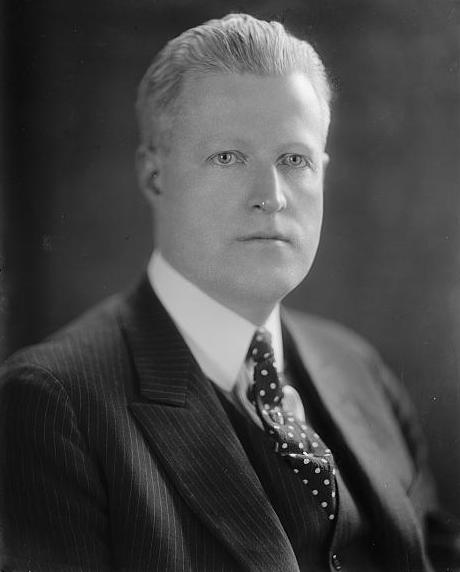
Henry in 1922

Lewis Henry (June 8, 1885 – July 23, 1941) was a lawyer, mining company executive, and Republican member of the United States House of Representatives from New York.

Henry was born in Elmira, New York. He graduated from Cornell University in 1909, where he was a member of Kappa Alpha Society and president of the Quill and Dagger society. He received a law degree from Columbia University in 1911. He was supervisor of Elmira's first ward from 1914 until 1920. He was elected to Congress in 1922 to fill the vacancy caused by the resignation of Alanson B. Houghton and served from April 11, 1922, until March 4, 1923.

After resuming law practice in Elmira, Henry served as president of the Oriental Consolidated Mining Company, a large producer of gold and one of the first mining concessions granted by the royal household of Korea. At the time of his presidency, the company was considered the "oldest, biggest, and richest" gold mining firm in Asia. Under Japanese pressure of gold export embargoes, Henry sold the firm in 1939 to Nippon Mining Co., Ltd.

He died in Boston, Massachusetts at the age of 56. He is interred at Woodlawn Cemetery in Elmira.

U.S. House of Representatives
Preceded by Alanson B. Houghton	Member of the U.S. House of Representatives from New York's 37th congressional district 1922–1923	Succeeded by Gale H. Stalker
