= Edwin Arthur Hall =

American politician (1909–2004)

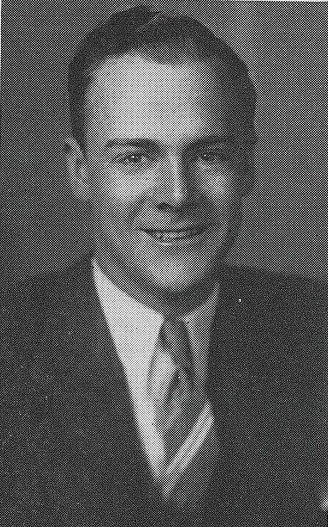

Member of the U.S. House of Representatives from New York
- In office November 7, 1939 – January 3, 1953
- Preceded by: Bert Lord
- Succeeded by: W. Sterling Cole (redistricting)
- Constituency: 34th district (1939–45); 37th district (1945–53)

Personal details
- Born: February 11, 1909 Binghamton, New York, U.S.
- Died: October 18, 2004 (aged 95) Montrose, Pennsylvania, U.S.
- Party: Republican
- Relations: John A. Collier (great-grandfather)
- Education: Cornell University

Edwin Arthur Hall (February 11, 1909 – October 18, 2004) was a Republican member of the United States House of Representatives from New York.

Hall was born in Binghamton, New York. He graduated from Cornell University in 1931, and was involved in several Binghamton-area businesses, including banking and construction. He was a member of the Binghamton City Council from 1937 until 1939. Hall was elected to Congress in 1939 to fill the vacancy caused by the death of Bert Lord and served from November 7, 1939, until January 3, 1953.

From 1953 to 1954 he was administrative assistant to New York State Assembly member Richard H. Knauf, and in 1955 and 1956 he was employed by the New York State Civil Service Commission. From 1957 to 1958 he was a member of the staff of the New York State Soil Conservation Service.

Hall then relocated to Pennsylvania and served on the Silver Lake School District Board from 1962 to 1965 and the Montrose Area School District Board from 1965 to 1971.

Hall died in Montrose, Pennsylvania on October 18, 2004. At the time of his death, he was the last living congressman to have served in the 1930s and the last representative to have served during the presidency of Franklin D. Roosevelt. He was buried at Quaker Lake Cemetery in Brackney.

He was the great-grandson of United States Representative John A. Collier.

== Sources ==
- United States Congress. "Edwin Arthur Hall (id: H000050)". Biographical Directory of the United States Congress.
- Edwin Arthur Hall at Political Graveyard

U.S. House of Representatives
| Preceded by Bert Lord | Member of the U.S. House of Representatives from New York's 34th congressional district 1939–1945 | Succeeded by Clarence E. Kilburn |
| Preceded by W. Sterling Cole | Member of the U.S. House of Representatives from New York's 37th congressional district 1945–1953 | Succeeded by W. Sterling Cole |
Honorary titles
| Preceded by Carl Curtis | Most senior living U.S. representative (Sitting or former); January 24, 2000 – October 18, 2004 | Succeeded by Bryan Dorn; George Smathers |
