= New York's 37th congressional district =

Former congressional district

Coordinates: 42°53′N 78°51′W

- Obsolete district
- Created: 1900
- Eliminated: 1980
- Years active: 1903–1983

New York's 37th congressional district was a congressional district for the United States House of Representatives in New York. It was created in 1903 as a result of the 1900 census. It was eliminated as a result of the redistricting cycle after the 1980 census. It was last represented by Henry J. Nowak who was redistricted into the 33rd district.

== Past components ==
1973–1983:

Parts of Erie

1971–1973:

All of Genesee, Orleans, Wyoming
Parts of Erie, Livingston, Monroe

1963–1971:

All of Genesee, Livingston, Orleans, Wyoming
Parts of Monroe

1953–1963:

All of Broome, Chemung, Steuben, Tioga

1945–1953:

All of Broome, Chenango, Madison

1913–1945:

All of Chemung, Schuyler, Steuben, Tioga, Tompkins

1903–1913:

All of Allegany, Cattaraugus, Chautauqua

== List of members representing the district ==
Representative	Party	Years	Cong ress	Note
District established March 4, 1903
Edward B. Vreeland (Salamanca)	Republican	March 4, 1903 – March 3, 1913	58th 59th 60th 61st 62nd	Elected in 1902. Re-elected in 1904. Re-elected in 1906. Re-elected in 1908. Re-elected in 1910. Redistricted from 34th district
Edwin S. Underhill (Bath)	Democratic	March 4, 1913 – March 3, 1915	63rd	Redistricted from 33rd district and re-elected in 1912. [data missing]
Harry H. Pratt (Corning)	Republican	March 4, 1915 – March 3, 1919	64th 65th	Elected in 1914. Re-elected in 1916. Unsuccessful candidate for renomination in 1918.
Alanson B. Houghton (Corning)	Republican	March 4, 1919 – February 28, 1922	66th 67th	Elected in 1918. Re-elected in 1920. Resigned to become United States Ambassador to Germany.
Vacant		March 1, 1922 – April 10, 1922	67th	
Lewis Henry (Elmira)	Republican	April 11, 1922 – March 3, 1923	67th	Elected to finish Houghton's term. Unsuccessful candidate for renomination in 1922.
Gale H. Stalker (Elmira)	Republican	March 4, 1923 – January 3, 1935	68th 69th 70th 71st 72nd 73rd	Elected in 1922. Re-elected in 1924. Re-elected in 1926. Re-elected in 1928. Re-elected in 1930. Re-elected in 1932. Not a candidate for renomination in 1934.
W. Sterling Cole (Bath)	Republican	January 3, 1935 – January 3, 1945	74th 75th 76th 77th 78th	Elected in 1934. Re-elected in 1936. Re-elected in 1938. Re-elected in 1940. Re-elected in 1942. Redistricted to 39th district.
Edwin A. Hall (Binghamton)	Republican	January 3, 1945 – January 3, 1953	79th 80th 81st 82nd	Redistricted from 34th district and re-elected in 1944. Re-elected in 1946. Re-elected in 1948. Re-elected in 1950. [data missing]
W. Sterling Cole (Bath)	Republican	January 3, 1953 – December 1, 1957	83rd 84th 85th	Redistricted from 39th district and re-elected in 1952. Re-elected in 1954. Re-elected in 1956. Resigned to head IAEA.
Vacant		December 2, 1957 – January 13, 1958	85th	
Howard W. Robison (Owego)	Republican	January 14, 1958 – January 3, 1963	85th 86th 87th	Elected to finish Cole's term. Re-elected in 1958. Re-elected in 1960. Redistricted to 33rd district.
Harold C. Ostertag (Attica)	Republican	January 3, 1963 – January 3, 1965	88th	Redistricted from 39th district and re-elected in 1962. [data missing]
Barber B. Conable, Jr. (Alexander)	Republican	January 3, 1965 – January 3, 1973	89th 90th 91st 92nd	Elected in 1964. Re-elected in 1966. Re-elected in 1968. Re-elected in 1970. Redistricted to 35th district.
Thaddeus J. Dulski (Buffalo)	Democratic	January 3, 1973 – December 31, 1974	93rd	Redistricted from 41st district and re-elected in 1972. Resigned.
Vacant		January 1, 1975 – January 2, 1975	93rd	
Henry J. Nowak (Buffalo)	Democratic	January 3, 1975 – January 3, 1983	94th 95th 96th 97th	Elected in 1974. Re-elected in 1976. Re-elected in 1978. Re-elected in 1980. Redistricted to 33rd district.
District dissolved January 3, 1983

== Election results ==
The following chart shows historic election results. Bold type indicates victor. Italic type indicates incumbent.

Year	Democratic	Republican	Other
1980	**Henry J. Nowak**: 94,890	Roger Heymanowski: 16,560	Thomas A. O'Conner (Right to Life): 2,887
1978	**Henry J. Nowak**: 70,911	Charles Poth III: 17,585	Dustin Haettenschwiller (Conservative): 1,501; Khushro Ghandi (Labor): 274
1976	**Henry J. Nowak**: 100,042	Calvin Kimbrough: 23,660	Stephen Grimm (Conservative): 4,249
1974	Henry J. Nowak: 84,064	Joseph R. Bala: 27,531	Ira Liebowitz (Socialist Labor): 521
1972	**Thaddeus J. Dulski**: 114,605	William F. McLaughlin: 44,103	
1970	Richard N. Anderson: 48,061	**Barber B. Conable, Jr.**: 107,677	Keith R. Wallis (Conservative): 7,729
1968	Norman M. Gerhard: 50,930	**Barber B. Conable, Jr.**: 129,697	Berta S. MacKenzie (Liberal): 1,899
1966	Kenneth Hed: 46,201	**Barber B. Conable, Jr.**: 104,342	Jerome Balter (Liberal): 3,683
1964	Neil F. Bubel: 80,411	Barber B. Conable, Jr.: 98,923	David L. McAdam (Liberal): 3,296
1962	Norman C. Katner: 56,428	**Harold C. Ostertag**: 101,821	
1960	Joseph V. Julian: 71,354	**Howard W. Robison**: 123,782	
1958	Francis P. Hogan: 52,636	**Howard W. Robison**: 101,279	
1956	Francis P. Hogan: 53,830	**W. Sterling Cole**: 136,044	
1954	John E. Bloomer: 37,525	**W. Sterling Cole**: 94,840	
1952	Jean Ivory: 57,474	**W. Sterling Cole**: 131,172	Robert L. Blandford (American Labor): 419
1950	John J. Burns: 33,018	**Edwin Arthur Hall**: 60,278	
1948	Myron C. Sloat: 35,503	**Edwin Arthur Hall**: 65,848	John Mushock (American Labor): 1,900; Pierre De Nio (Liberal): 598
1946	Charles R. Wilson: 23,687	**Edwin Arthur Hall**: 59,920	
1944	James S. Byrne: 33,465	**Edwin Arthur Hall**: 75,246	
1942	Daniel Crowley: 22,452	**W. Sterling Cole**: 54,700	
1940	David Moses: 38,878	**W. Sterling Cole**: 76,630	L. Cyrus Rigby (American Labor): 2,552
1938	David Moses: 37,216	**W. Sterling Cole**: 57,648	Trevor Teele (Socialist): 355
1936	Paul Smith: 38,560	**W. Sterling Cole**: 73,018	Trevor Teele (Socialist): 1,493; Allen R. Chase (Communist): 145
1934	Julian P. Bretz: 28,979	W. Sterling Cole: 48,964	Neil D. Cramer (Law Preservation): 2,231; William C. Perry (Socialist): 1,562; Sammie A. Abbott (Communist): 161
1932	Julian P. Bretz: 48,048	**Gale H. Stalker**: 55,305	Edward Amherst Ott (Socialist): 1,401; John D. Driscoll (Liberal): 696
1930	Julian P. Bretz: 28,723	**Gale H. Stalker**: 44,374	Hezekiah D. Wilcox (Socialist): 1,620
1928	Paul Smith: 33,212	**Gale H. Stalker**: 78,789	
1926	Edwin S. Underhill: 32,618	**Gale H. Stalker**: 46,757	Daniel D. Hungerford (Socialist): 933
1924	Charles L. Durham: 27,763	**Gale H. Stalker**: 59,498	Daniel D. Hungerford (Socialist): 1,720
1922	Charles P. Smith: 28,290	Gale H. Stalker: 42,144	William J.C. Wismar (Socialist): 821
1920	Charles B. Durham: 21,762	**Alanson B. Houghton**: 51,512	Francis Toomey (Socialist): 2,456
