= Gale H. Stalker =

American politician

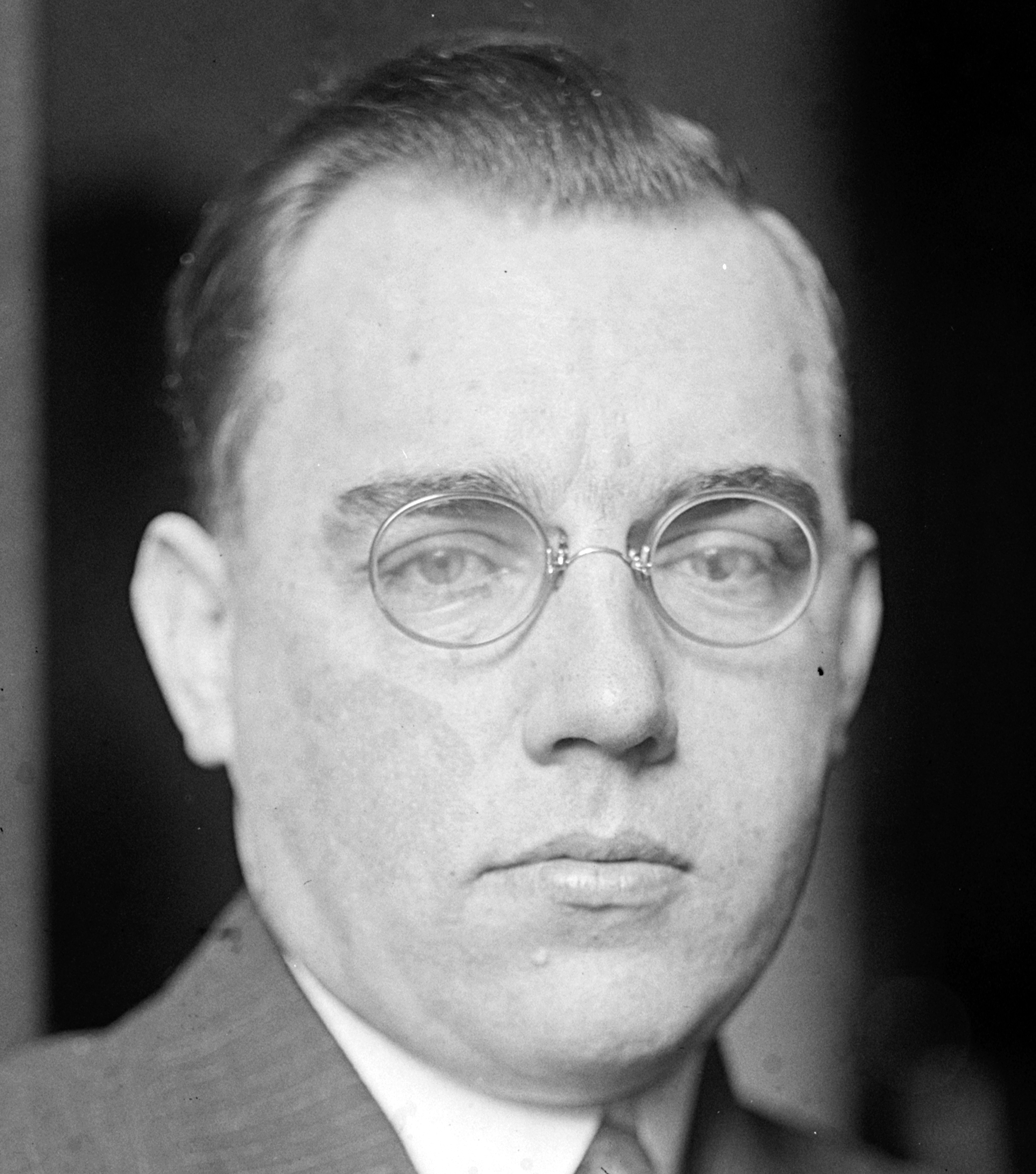

Member of the U.S. House of Representatives from New York's 37th district
- In office March 4, 1923 – January 3, 1935
- Preceded by: Lewis Henry
- Succeeded by: W. Sterling Cole

Personal details
- Born: Gale Hamilton Stalker; November 7, 1889 Long Eddy, Sullivan County, New York, U.S.
- Died: November 4, 1985 (aged 95) Palm Bay, Florida, U.S.
- Resting place: Hillside Cemetery, Ormond Beach, Florida, U.S.
- Party: Republican
- Education: Lackawanna College
- Profession: Banker; Businessman

Gale Hamilton Stalker (November 7, 1889 – November 4, 1985) was a Republican member of the United States House of Representatives from New York.

== Early life and education ==
Gale H. Stalker was born in Long Eddy in Sullivan County, New York on November 7, 1889. He studied at Scranton Business College in Scranton, Pennsylvania, which is now Lackawanna College. He then moved to Elmira, New York.

== Career ==
Stalker was active in lumber and oil and gas businesses, banking, and other ventures. During World War I, he was nicknamed "Tent Peg" because his lumber company filled a contract to provide millions of tent poles and pegs to the United States Army.

He was elected to Congress in 1922 and served from March 4, 1923 until January 3, 1935.

He died on November 4, 1985, in Palm Bay, Florida and was buried at Hillside Cemetery in Ormond Beach, Florida.

== Sources ==
U.S. House of Representatives
Preceded by Lewis Henry	Member of the U.S. House of Representatives from New York's 37th congressional district 1923–1935	Succeeded by W. Sterling Cole
