= W. Sterling Cole =

American politician (1904–1987)

William Sterling Cole
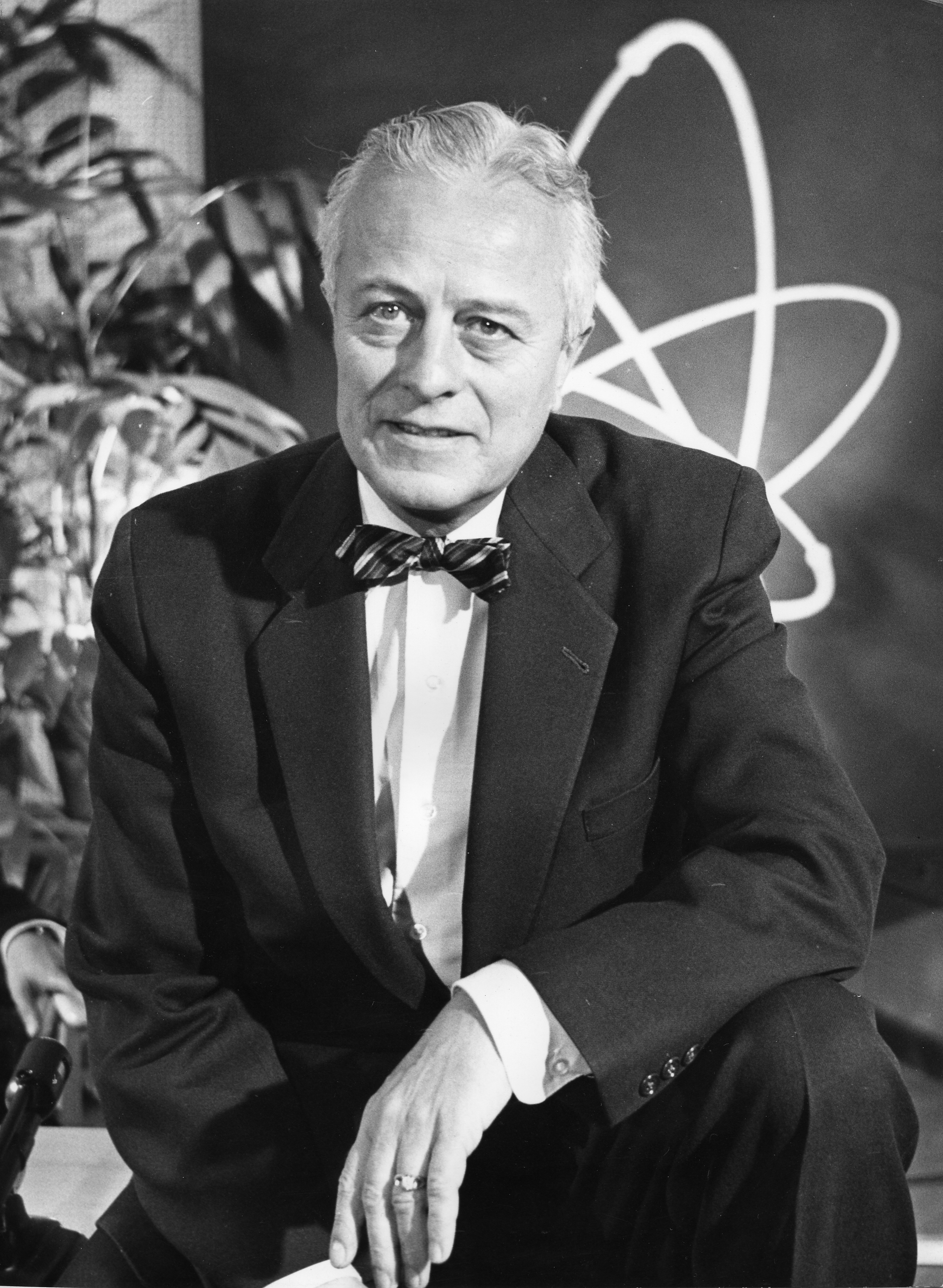
- William Sterling Cole, 1958

1st Director General of the International Atomic Energy Agency
- In office December 1, 1957 – November 30, 1961
- Succeeded by: Sigvard Eklund

Member of the U.S. House of Representatives from New York
- In office January 3, 1935 – December 1, 1957
- Preceded by: Gale H. Stalker
- Succeeded by: Howard W. Robison
- Constituency: 37th district (1935–1945); 39th district (1945–1953); 37th district (1953–1957)

Personal details
- Born: April 18, 1904 Painted Post, New York, U.S.
- Died: March 15, 1987 (aged 82) Washington, D.C., U.S.
- Education: Colgate University; Albany Law School

William Sterling Cole (April 18, 1904 – March 15, 1987) was an American politician, lawyer, and civil servant who served as the first director general of the International Atomic Energy Agency (IAEA) from 1957 to 1961. Before his appointment to the IAEA he was a Republican member of the United States House of Representatives from New York.

== Biography ==
W. Sterling Cole was born in Painted Post, New York. He graduated from Colgate University in 1925 and Albany Law School in 1929. Cole practiced law in Bath, New York.

As a Republican, Cole was elected to Congress in 1934 and served from January 3, 1935, until his resignation on December 1, 1957. Cole voted in favor of the Civil Rights Act of 1957. He resigned to become the first Director General of the International Atomic Energy Agency and remained at that post until 1961.

After leaving the IAEA Cole resided in Arlington, Virginia and practiced law in Washington, D.C. He died in Washington on March 15, 1987.

== Sources ==
- United States Congress. "W. Sterling Cole (id: C000617)". Biographical Directory of the United States Congress.

U.S. House of Representatives
Preceded by Gale H. Stalker	Member of the U.S. House of Representatives from New York's 37th congressional district 1935–1945	Succeeded by Edwin Arthur Hall
Preceded by James W. Wadsworth, Jr.	Member of the U.S. House of Representatives from New York's 39th congressional district 1945–1953	Succeeded by Harold C. Ostertag
Preceded by Edwin Arthur Hall	Member of the U.S. House of Representatives from New York's 37th congressional district 1953–1957	Succeeded by Howard W. Robison
Non-profit organization positions
Preceded by IAEA created in 1957	Director General of the IAEA; 1957 – 1961	Succeeded by Sigvard Eklund
