= New York's 39th congressional district =

Former congressional district

Coordinates: 42°15′N 78°40′W

- Obsolete district
- Created: 1910
- Eliminated: 1980
- Years active: 1913–1983

New York's 39th congressional district was a congressional district for the United States House of Representatives in New York. It was created in 1913 as a result of the 1910 U.S. census. It was eliminated in 1983 as a result of the redistricting cycle after the 1980 census. It was last represented by Stan Lundine who was redistricted into the 34th congressional district.

== Components ==
1973–1983:

All of Allegany County, Cattaraugus County and Chautauqua County
Parts of Chemung County, Erie County and Steuben County

1963–1973:

Parts of Erie County

1953–1963:

All of Genesee County, Orleans County and Wyoming County
Parts of Monroe County

1945–1953:

All of Chemung County, Schuyler County, Steuben County, Tioga County and Tompkins County

1913–1945:

All of Genesee County, Livingston County, Orleans County and Wyoming County
Parts of Monroe County

== List of members representing the district ==
Representative	Party	Years	Cong ress	Note
District established March 4, 1913
Henry G. Danforth (Rochester)	Republican	March 4, 1913 – March 3, 1917	63rd 64th	Redistricted from the 32nd district and re-elected in 1912. Re-elected in 1914. [data missing]
Archie D. Sanders (Stafford)	Republican	March 4, 1917 – March 3, 1933	65th 66th 67th 68th 69th 70th 71st 72nd	Elected in 1916. Re-elected in 1918. Re-elected in 1920. Re-elected in 1922. Re-elected in 1924. Re-elected in 1926. Re-elected in 1928. Re-elected in 1930. Retired.
James W. Wadsworth Jr. (Geneseo)	Republican	March 4, 1933 – January 3, 1945	73rd 74th 75th 76th 77th 78th	Elected in 1932. Re-elected in 1934. Re-elected in 1936. Re-elected in 1938. Re-elected in 1940. Re-elected in 1942. Redistricted to the 41st district.
W. Sterling Cole (Bath)	Republican	January 3, 1945 – January 3, 1953	79th 80th 81st 82nd	Redistricted from the 37th district and re-elected in 1944. Re-elected in 1946. Re-elected in 1948. Re-elected in 1950. Redistricted to the 37th district.
Harold C. Ostertag (Attica)	Republican	January 3, 1953 – January 3, 1963	83rd 84th 85th 86th 87th	Redistricted from the 41st district and re-elected in 1952. Re-elected in 1954. Re-elected in 1956. Re-elected in 1958. Re-elected in 1960. Redistricted to the 37th district.
John R. Pillion (Lake View)	Republican	January 3, 1963 – January 3, 1965	88th	Redistricted from the 42nd district and re-elected in 1962. [data missing]
Richard D. McCarthy (Buffalo)	Democratic	January 3, 1965 – January 3, 1971	89th 90th 91st	Elected in 1964. Re-elected in 1966. Re-elected in 1968. Retired to run for U.S. Senate.
Jack Kemp (Hamburg)	Republican	January 3, 1971 – January 3, 1973	92nd	Elected in 1970. Redistricted to the 38th district.
James F. Hastings (Caneadea)	Republican	January 3, 1973 – January 20, 1976	93rd 94th	Redistricted from the 38th district and re-elected in 1972. Re-elected in 1974. Resigned.
Vacant		January 21, 1976 – March 1, 1976	94th	
Stan Lundine (Jamestown)	Democratic	March 2, 1976 – January 3, 1983	94th 95th 96th 97th	Elected to finish Hastings's term. Re-elected in 1976. Re-elected in 1978. Re-elected in 1980. Redistricted to the 34th district.
District dissolved January 3, 1983

== Election results ==
The following chart shows historic election results. Bold type indicates victor. Italic type indicates incumbent.

Year	Democratic	Republican	Other
1980	**Stanley N. Lundine**: 93,839	James Abdella: 75,039	Genevieve F. Roman (Right to Life): 2,554
1978	**Stanley N. Lundine**: 79,385	Crispin Maguire: 56,431	
1976	**Stanley N. Lundine**: 109,986	Richard A. Snowden: 68,018	
1974	William L. Parment: 53,866	**James F. Hastings**: 87,321	Joseph V. Damiano (Conservative): 3,832
1972	Wilbur White, Jr.: 49,253	**James F. Hastings**: 126,147	
1970	Thomas P. Flaherty: 90,949	Jack Kemp: 96,989	
1968	**Richard D. McCarthy**: 120,509	Daniel E. Weber: 92,589	John R. Pillion (Conservative): 7,613
1966	**Richard D. McCarthy**: 95,671	John R. Pillion: 87,230	
1964	Richard D. McCarthy: 108,235	John R. Pillion: 96,934	
1962	Angelo S. D'Eloia: 55,774	**John R. Pillion**: 99,527	Walter Bratek (Liberal): 3,661
1960	Henry R. Dutcher, Jr.: 69,704	**Harold C. Ostertag**: 103,162	
1958	Harold L. Rakov: 48,144	**Harold C. Ostertag**: 90,004	
1956	William H. Mostyn: 48,634	**Harold C. Ostertag**: 116,043	
1954	George W. Cooke: 45,000	**Harold C. Ostertag**: 82,769	
1952	O. Richard Judson: 55,483	**Harold C. Ostertag**: 107,501	Michael J. Burke (American Labor): 281
1950	Donald J. O'Connor: 31,639	**W. Sterling Cole**: 64,377	Grace W. Hill (American Labor): 1,092
1948	Donald J. O'Connor: 37,272	**W. Sterling Cole**: 70,659	Harold Slingerland (American Labor): 2,002
1946	William Heidt, Jr.: 23,205	**W. Sterling Cole**: 61,330	
1944	Charlotte D. Curren: 31,152	**W. Sterling Cole**: 75,740	Julian P. Bretz (American Labor): 4,396
1942		**James W. Wadsworth, Jr.**: 83,195	
1940	J. Frederick Colson: 48,133	**James W. Wadsworth, Jr.**: 73,316	
1938	J. Frank Gilligan: 28,292	**James W. Wadsworth, Jr.**: 65,489	Edward J. Wagner (American Labor): 5,460; Clair Walbridge (Socialist): 336
1936	Donald J. Corbett: 41,699	**James W. Wadsworth, Jr.**: 66,869	Charles A. Lissow (Union): 3,727; Clair Walbridge (Socialist): 1,811; Canio Parrini (Communist): 172
1934	David A. White: 36,658	**James W. Wadsworth, Jr.**: 49,915	John Canden Bosch (Socialist): 2,001; Canio Parrini (Communist): 215
1932	David A. White: 35,367	James W. Wadsworth, Jr.: 50,855	Ernest R. Clark (Law Preservation): 20,209; Martin T. Cook (Socialist): 1,500
1930	James M. Dwyer: 29,610	**Archie D. Sanders**: 40,069	William Hilsdorf, Sr. (Socialist): 2,140
1928	Frank L. Morris: 34,175	**Archie D. Sanders**: 69,615	George Weber (Socialist): 3,371
1926	David A. White: 20,449	**Archie D. Sanders**: 48,623	George Weber (Socialist): 2,714
1924	Michael L. Coleman: 23,689	**Archie D. Sanders**: 58,165	George Weber (Socialist): 3,798
1922	David A. White: 22,585	**Archie D. Sanders**: 37,852	Clark Allis (Prohibition): 2,100
1920	David A. White: 17,602	**Archie D. Sanders**: 53,079	George Weber (Socialist): 3,943
