= Harold C. Ostertag =

American politician (1896–1985)

Harold Charles Ostertag
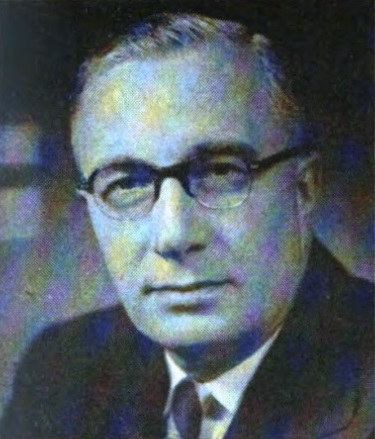

Member of the U.S. House of Representatives from New York
- In office January 3, 1951 – January 3, 1965
- Preceded by: James W. Wadsworth, Jr.
- Succeeded by: Barber B. Conable, Jr.
- Constituency: 41st district (1951–53); 39th district (1953–63); 37th district (1963–65)

Member of the New York State Assembly from Wyoming County
- In office January 1, 1932 – November 7, 1950
- Preceded by: Joe R. Hanley
- Succeeded by: Harold L. Peet

Personal details
- Born: June 22, 1896 Attica, New York, U.S.
- Died: May 2, 1985 (aged 88) Pompano Beach, Florida, U.S.
- Resting place: Forest Hill Cemetery; Attica, New York, U.S.
- Party: Republican
- Spouse: Grace J. Ostertag
- Education: Chamberlain Military Institute; Perry, New York
- Profession: Railroad executive Legislator

Military service
- Branch/service: United States Army
- Years of service: 1917–1919
- Rank: Second Lieutenant
- Unit: 55th Pioneer Infantry, 27th Division
- Battles/wars: World War I France

Harold Charles Ostertag (June 22, 1896 – May 2, 1985) was an American politician, a United States representative for the 41st, 39th, and 37th congressional districts of New York.

== Life ==
Ostertag was born on June 22, 1896, in Attica, New York, attended the public schools, and graduated from Chamberlain Military Institute in Perry, New York in 1915. He worked for the New York Central Railroad from 1917 to 1950 and became assistant to the vice president of the traffic department.

During World War I, Ostertag enlisted in the New York Army National Guard's 74th Infantry Regiment. This organization was federalized as the 55th Pioneer Infantry Regiment, a unit of the 27th Division. Ostertag, who had attained the rank of Sergeant, completed officer training and received his commission as a Second Lieutenant while serving with the 55th in France. After the war, he was active in the American Legion and Veterans of Foreign Wars and entered politics as a Republican.

Ostertag was a member of the New York State Assembly (Wyoming Co.) in 1932, 1933, 1934, 1935, 1936, 1937, 1938, 1939–40, 1941–42, 1943–44, 1945–46, 1947–48 and 1949–50.

He was elected as a Republican to the 82nd, 83rd, 84th, 85th, 86th, 87th and 88th United States Congresses, holding office from January 3, 1951, to January 3, 1965. He did not run for re-election in 1964. Ostertag voted in favor of the Civil Rights Acts of 1957, 1960, and 1964, as well as the 24th Amendment to the U.S. Constitution.

Ostertag was a delegate to the 1952, 1956 and 1960 Republican National Conventions.

Ostertag was a resident of Perry until he died in Pompano Beach, Florida, on May 2, 1985. He was interred at Forest Hill Cemetery in Attica.

Ostertag's wife Grace was Grand Matron of the Order of the Eastern Star and first vice president of the Congressional Club.

New York State Assembly
Preceded by Joe R. Hanley	New York State Assembly; Wyoming County; 1932–1950	Succeeded by Harold L. Peet
U.S. House of Representatives
Preceded by James W. Wadsworth, Jr.	Member of the U.S. House of Representatives from New York's 41st congressional district 1951–1953	Succeeded by Edmund P. Radwan
Preceded by W. Sterling Cole	Member of the U.S. House of Representatives from New York's 39th congressional district 1953–1963	Succeeded by John R. Pillion
Preceded by Howard W. Robison	Member of the U.S. House of Representatives from New York's 37th congressional district 1963–1965	Succeeded by Barber Conable
