= Henry J. Nowak =

American politician (1935–2024)

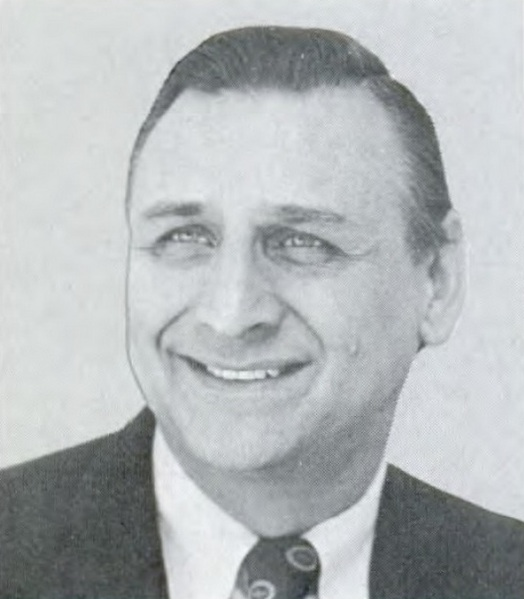
- Nowak, c. 1989

Member of the U.S. House of Representatives from New York
- In office January 3, 1975 – January 3, 1993
- Preceded by: Thaddeus J. Dulski
- Succeeded by: Jack Quinn (redistricting)
- Constituency: 37th district (1975–1983); 33rd district (1983–1993)

Comptroller of Erie County, New York
- In office January 1, 1966 – September 11, 1974
- Preceded by: Clinton C. Couhig
- Succeeded by: Anthony P. LoRusso

Personal details
- Born: Henry James Nowak; February 21, 1935 Buffalo, New York, U.S.
- Died: July 21, 2024 (aged 89) Pompano Beach, Florida, U.S.
- Party: Democratic
- Spouse: Rose Santa Lucia
- Children: 2
- Education: Canisius College (BA); University of Buffalo (JD)

Military service
- Allegiance: United States
- Branch/service: United States Army
- Years of service: 1957–1958; 1961–1962
- Rank: Captain

Henry James Nowak (February 21, 1935 – July 21, 2024) was an American lawyer, politician, and a Democratic member of the United States House of Representatives from New York between 1975 and 1993.

== Early life ==
Nowak was born in Buffalo, New York, in 1935. He attended public elementary schools in Buffalo and graduated from Riverside High School, Buffalo, in 1953. He earned a B.A. from Canisius College, Buffalo in 1957.

During his college career, Nowak was a star basketball player for the Golden Griffs. When he graduated, he was Canisius College's all-time scoring leader. In three years as a starter, he scored 1,449 points and averaged 18.6 points a game. Today, he still ranks first in rebounding and third in all-time scoring. As a basketball player, Nowak was nicknamed "Hammerin' Hank" for his tough, aggressive playstyle. Nowak led the Griffs to three of their four appearances in the NCAA basketball tournament. The St. Louis Hawks subsequently drafted him with the 28th pick in the 1957 NBA draft.

From 1957 to 1958, Nowak served in the United States Army, then earned a J.D. from the University of Buffalo Law School in 1961. He then served in the Army again from 1961 to 1962.

== Political career ==
Admitted to the New York bar in 1963, he commenced practice in Buffalo, and served as assistant district attorney of Erie County, New York in 1964. Erie County Comptroller from 1966 to 1974, he was also a delegate to the New York State Democratic convention in 1970, and to the Democratic National Convention in 1972 and 1988.

=== Congress ===
Nowak was elected as a Democrat in 1974 – among a group of liberal Democrats elected that year known as the Watergate Babies — to represent New York's 37th congressional district in the 94th Congress, after 4 terms Nowak was redistricted into the 33rd district, which he represented for 5 terms. He served from January 3, 1975, to January 3, 1993, choosing not to try and return to the House after the 33rd district was abolished during redistricting. During his entire congressional career, he was a member of the U.S. House Committee on Public Works and Transportation. He was described in The Buffalo News as "Buffalo's billion-dollar man", a self-effacing lawmaker mainly known for securing grants for infrastructure projects in the Buffalo area, including the construction of Interstate 990. During the 103rd Congress, Nowak chose not to run for reelection in 1994. With many new members anticipated in 1995 because of heavy turnover, Nowak reportedly did not want to remain in Congress so long his successor started a House career with a seniority disadvantage, though his decision to retire prompted disappointment among Democratic leaders in both Buffalo and Albany, the state capital.

== Personal life and death ==
A resident of Buffalo, New York, Nowak has a daughter, Diane (Nowak) Kent, who is also in the Canisius Sports Hall of Fame, inducted in 2002. His son, Henry Joseph Nowak, was elected a justice of the New York Supreme Court's 8th judicial district in 2010 and served as a judge of the Buffalo Housing Court from 2003 to 2010.

Nowak died in Pompano Beach, Florida, on July 21, 2024, at the age of 89.

U.S. House of Representatives
Preceded by Thaddeus J. Dulski	Member of the U.S. House of Representatives from New York's 37th congressional district 1975–1983	Succeeded by District 37 eliminated after the 1980 Census
Preceded by Gary A. Lee	Member of the U.S. House of Representatives from New York's 33rd congressional district 1983–1993	Succeeded by District 33 eliminated after the 1990 Census and became part of 30th District
