= Howard W. Robison =

American politician

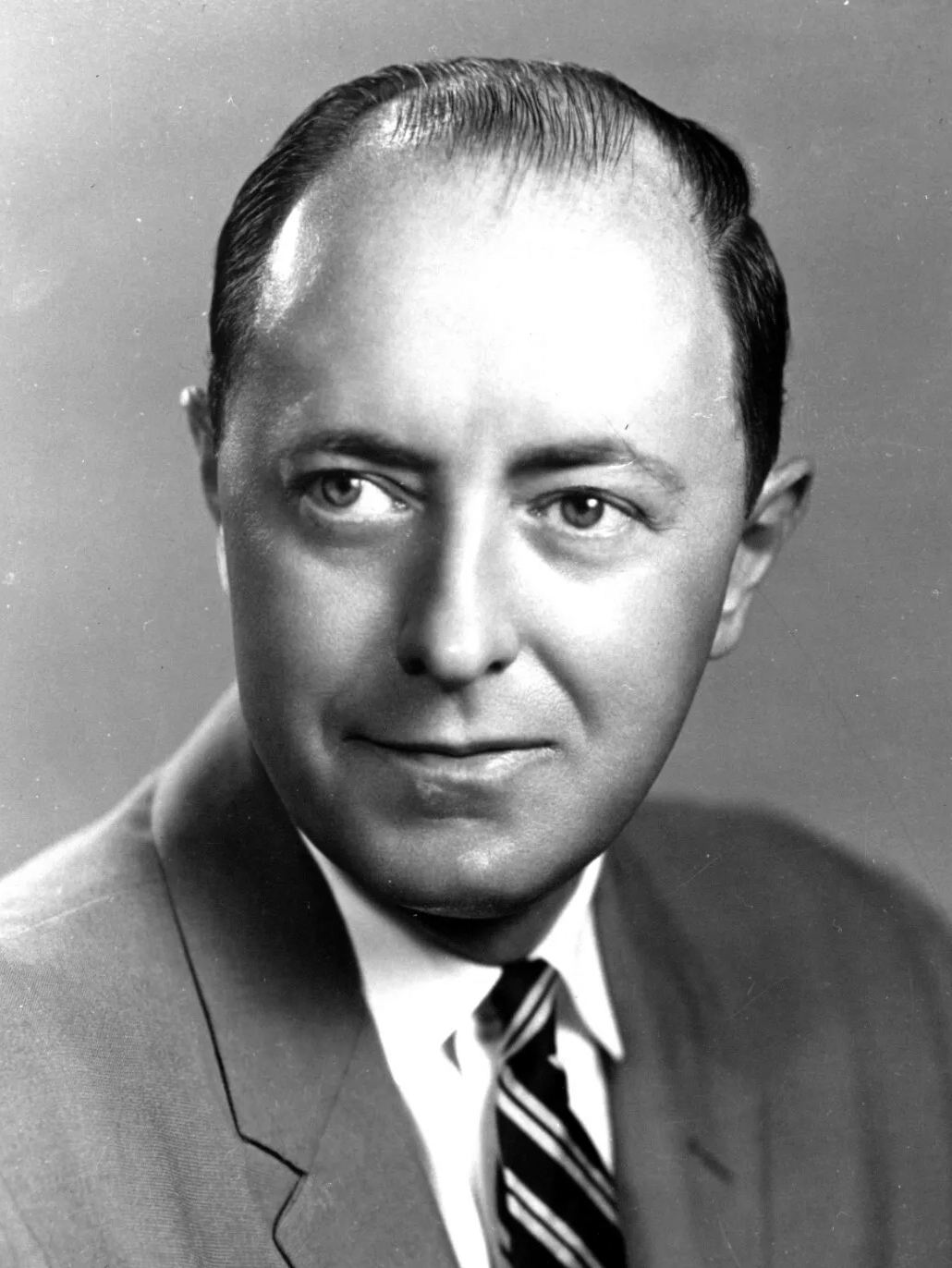
- Robison while serving in the U.S. House in 1959

Member of the U.S. House of Representatives from New York
- In office January 14, 1958 – January 3, 1975
- Preceded by: W. Sterling Cole
- Succeeded by: Matthew F. McHugh
- Constituency: 37th district (1958–1963); 33rd district (1963–1973); 27th district (1973–1975)

Personal details
- Born: October 30, 1915 Owego, New York, US
- Died: September 26, 1987 (aged 71) Rehoboth Beach, Delaware, US
- Resting place: Evergreen Cemetery, Owego, New York, US
- Party: Republican
- Spouse: Gertrude "Trudy" L. Frederick (m. 1946)
- Children: 2
- Profession: Attorney

Military service
- Service: United States Army
- Years of service: 1942–1946
- Rank: Staff Sergeant
- Unit: U.S. Army Counterintelligence Corps
- Wars: World War II

Howard Winfield Robison (October 30, 1915 – September 26, 1987) was an American attorney and politician from New York. A Republican, he served in the United States House of Representatives from 1958 to 1975.

== Early life ==
Howard W. Robison was born in Owego, New York on October 30, 1915, the son of Addison J. Robison and Pluma (Moe) Robison. He was educated in Owego, and graduated from Owego Free Academy. He graduated from Cornell University with a Bachelor of Arts degree in 1937 and received his LL.B. degree from Cornell Law School in 1939. After law school, Robison was admitted to the bar and began to practice in Owego.

== Career ==
In 1942, Robison enlisted for World War II. After completing his initial training in the United States Army, he was assigned to the Counterintelligence Corps (CIC). Robison was a CIC investigator until receiving his discharge in 1946, and attained the rank of Staff Sergeant.

After his military service, Robison resumed practicing law in Owego. A Republican, he served as county attorney of Tioga County, New York from 1946 to 1957, a member of Owego's town board from 1947 to 1956, and Owego's town attorney from 1957 to 1958.

== Member of Congress ==
In 1958, Robison was elected to the U.S. House in a special election held to fill the vacancy caused by the resignation of W. Sterling Cole. He was reelected every two years from November 1958 to November 1972 and served from January 14, 1958, until January 3, 1975.

Robison voted in favor of the Civil Rights Acts of 1960, 1964, and 1968, as well as the 24th Amendment to the U.S. Constitution and the Voting Rights Act of 1965.

== Later life ==
After leaving Congress, Robison was vice president for congressional relations at the American Railroad Association and was a resident of Rehoboth Beach, Delaware. He died in Rehoboth Beach on September 26, 1987 and was buried at Evergreen Cemetery in Owego.

== Family ==
In 1946, Robison married Gertrude L. Frederick, nicknamed "Trudy". They were married until his death and were the parents of two sons.

== Sources ==
- United States Congress. "Howard W. Robison (id: R000357)". Biographical Directory of the United States Congress.

U.S. House of Representatives
| Preceded by W. Sterling Cole | Member of the U.S. House of Representatives from New York's 37th congressional district 1958–1963 | Succeeded by Harold C. Ostertag |
| Preceded by Clarence E. Kilburn | Member of the U.S. House of Representatives from New York's 33rd congressional district 1963–1973 | Succeeded by William F. Walsh |
| Preceded by John G. Dow | Member of the U.S. House of Representatives from New York's 27th congressional district 1973–1975 | Succeeded by Matthew F. McHugh |
