= Thaddeus J. Dulski =

American politician

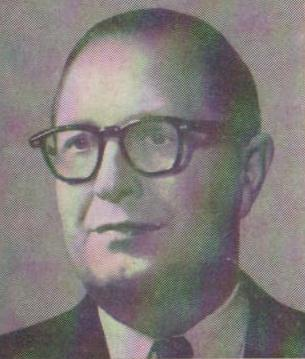
- Dulski in 1959

Chairman of the U.S. House Post Office and Civil Service Committee
- In office 1967–1974
- Preceded by: Tom J. Murray
- Succeeded by: William D. Ford

Member of the U.S. House of Representatives from New York
- In office January 3, 1959 – December 31, 1974
- Preceded by: Edmund P. Radwan
- Succeeded by: Henry J. Nowak
- Constituency: 41st district (1959–73); 37th district (1973–74)

Personal details
- Born: Thaddeus Joseph Dulski; September 27, 1915 Buffalo, New York, US
- Died: October 11, 1988 (aged 73) Buffalo, New York, US
- Resting place: Mount Calvary Cemetery, Cheektowaga, New York
- Party: Democratic
- Education: Canisius College; University at Buffalo

Military service
- Allegiance: United States
- Branch/service: United States Navy
- Battles/wars: World War II

Thaddeus Joseph Dulski (September 27, 1915 – October 11, 1988) was an American politician from Buffalo, New York who served in the United States House of Representatives as a Democrat from 1959 to 1974.

== Biography ==
Dulski was born in Buffalo, New York, US, on September 27, 1915. He graduated from Buffalo's Technical High School, and studied at Canisius College and the University at Buffalo.

=== Career ===
He worked as a tax consultant and accountant, and served in the United States Navy during World War II.

From 1940 to 1947 he worked for the Bureau of Internal Revenue and the Office of Price Stabilization. He was elected to the Buffalo City Council representing the Walden District for two terms starting in 1953, and was elected councilman at large in 1957.

=== Tenure in Congress ===
He served in the House of Representatives as a Democrat from 1959 until he resigned on December 31, 1974. During his House tenure, he served as a member of the Post Office and Civil Service Committee, of which he was chairman from 1967 until his resignation from Congress. His Congressional career included helping craft legislation to change the federal Post Office Department into the U.S. Postal Service.

=== Later career and death ===
After leaving Congress, Dulski was a special assistant to Governor Hugh Carey, with whom he had served in the U.S. House.

He retired in 1983 and died of leukemia at the Roswell Park Comprehensive Cancer Center in Buffalo on October 11, 1988, aged 73. His funeral took place at Queen of Peace Catholic Church in Buffalo, and he was buried at Mount Calvary Cemetery in Cheektowaga, New York.

== Family ==
Dulski was married to Elizabeth "Betty" (Wozniak) Dulski. They were the parents of five children.

== Legacy ==
The Thaddeus J. Dulski Building was a federal office building in Buffalo. It was vacated by the government in 2005, and later redeveloped as The Avant.

U.S. House of Representatives
Preceded by Edmund P. Radwan	Member of the U.S. House of Representatives from New York's 41st congressional district 1959–1973	Succeeded by District 41 eliminated after the 1970 Census
Preceded by Barber Conable	Member of the U.S. House of Representatives from New York's 37th congressional district 1973–1974	Succeeded by Henry J. Nowak
