= Don Taylor =

Don or Donald Taylor may refer to:

== Entertainment ==
- Don Taylor (American filmmaker) (1920–1998), actor and director
- Don Taylor, American bass vocalist with Foggy River Boys/The Marksmen in 1954
- Don Taylor (English director and playwright) (1936–2003), stage, television and film producer
- Don Taylor (sportscaster) (born 1959), Canadian television and radio presenter

== Politics ==
- Donald S. Taylor (1898–1970), judge of the New York Supreme Court
- Don Taylor (Australian politician) (born 1928), Deputy Premier of Western Australia
- Don L. Taylor (born 1931), Canadian MP for Cowichan—Malahat—The Islands
- Donald Taylor (Yukon politician) (1933–2012), Speaker of the Yukon Legislative Assembly
- Donald L. Taylor (1915–1987), American politician in the New York State Assembly

== Sports ==
- Don Taylor (footballer) (1920–1994), Australian rules half-back
- Don Taylor (cricketer) (1923–1980), New Zealand cricketer

== Other ==
- Donald Taylor (aviator) (1918–2015), American pioneering pilot
- E. Don Taylor (1937–2014), Jamaican-born Episcopal Bishop of Virgin Islands
- D. Taylor (born 1950s), American labor union leader
