= Indian Education and Self-Assistance Act (Snyder Act) =

1917 law related to Native Americans

In United States federal legislation, the Indian Education and Self-Assistance Act (Snyder Act) was passed in 1917 and sponsored by Rep. Homer P. Snyder (R) of New York.

It empowered the Bureau of Indian Affairs, under the Secretary of the Interior, to appropriate money for the general improvement of the quality of life among Native Americans on reservations including adult literacy programs and health care facilities.
