= Wardsboro, Vermont =

- Town
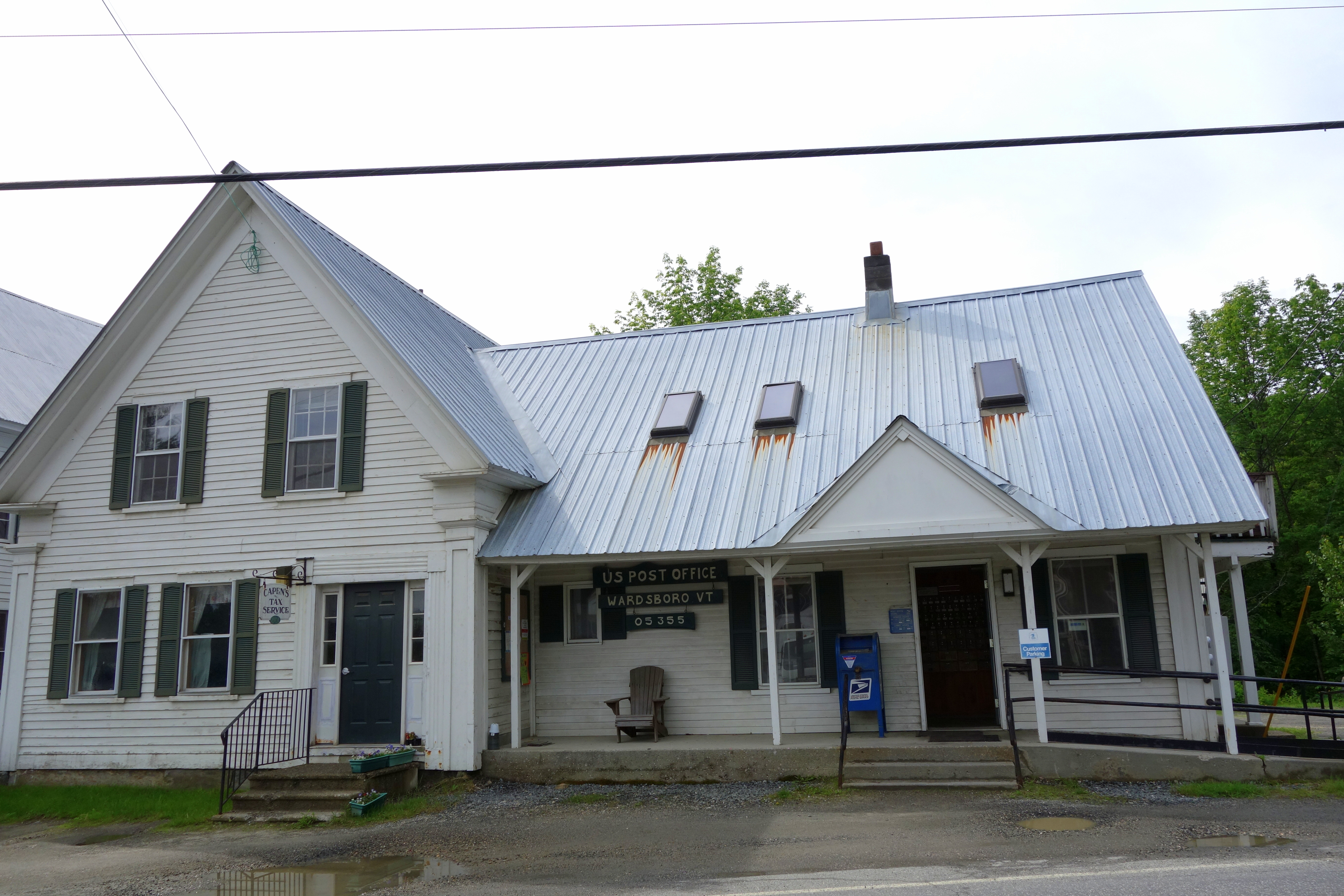
- US Post Office Wardsboro

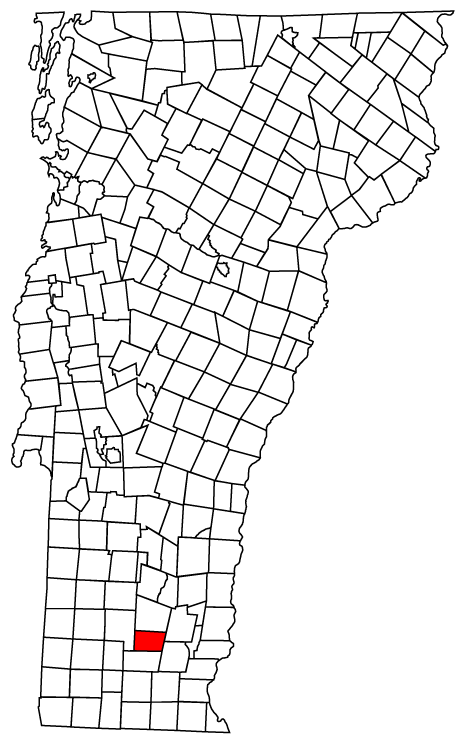
- Wardsboro, Vermont
- Coordinates: 43°00′30″N 72°48′40″W
- Country: United States
- State: Vermont
- County: Windham
- Chartered: 1780
- Communities: Wardsboro; Podunk; South Wardsboro; Wardsboro Center; West Wardsboro

Area
  - Total: 29.3 sq mi (75.8 km^{2})
  - Land: 29.3 sq mi (75.8 km^{2})
  - Water: 0 sq mi (0.0 km^{2})
- Elevation: 1,962 ft (598 m)

Population (2020)
  - Total: 869
  - Density: 30/sq mi (11.5/km^{2})
- Time zone: UTC-5 (Eastern (EST))
  - Summer (DST): UTC-4 (EDT)
- ZIP Codes: 05355 (Wardsboro); 05360 (West Wardsboro)
- Area code: 802
- FIPS code: 50-76225
- GNIS feature ID: 1462241

Wardsboro is a town in Windham County, Vermont, United States. The population was 869 at the 2020 census. The town includes the villages of Wardsboro, Wardsboro Center, West Wardsboro and South Wardsboro.

== History ==
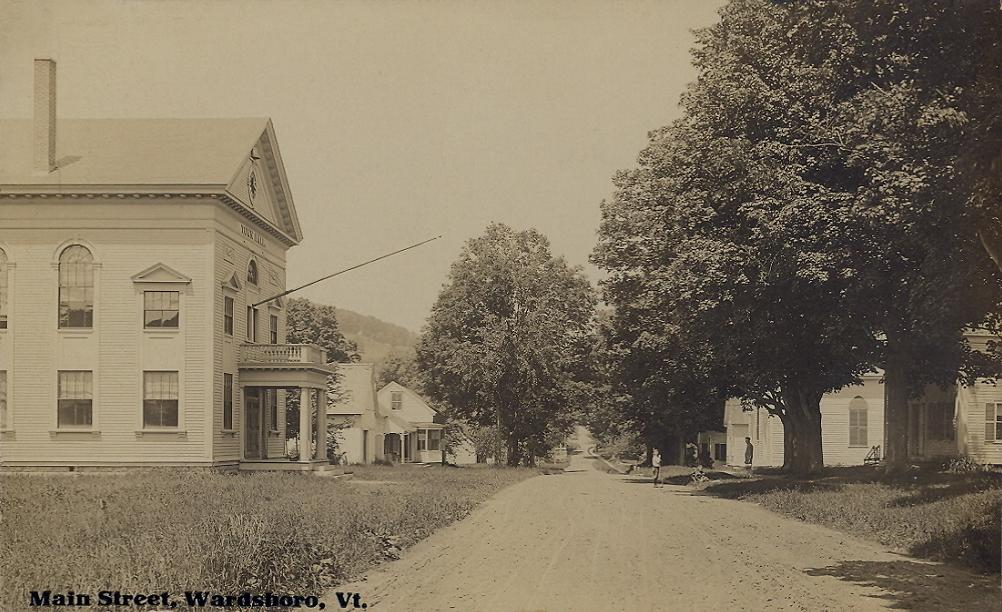
Main Street c. 1915

The town was settled circa 1779 by Samuel Davis and his wife from Milford, Massachusetts. It was granted and chartered on November 7, 1780, to William Ward of Newfane, for whom the town was named Wardsborough, together with 62 others. In 1788, it was divided into north and south districts, the latter set off and incorporated in 1810 as Dover. Although the terrain is very uneven and in parts rocky, farmers worked the soil into productivity.

Mills were built along the brook, a tributary of the West River. In 1859, industries included three gristmills, six sawmills, one tannery, and a rawhide whip factory. During the Civil War, Wardsborough Center was called Unionville because of its strong Federal sentiment. In the 1880s, Jebediah Estabrook's tub, bucket and pail factory at Wardsborough Center was the area's principal employer. In 1894, the U.S. Post Office dropped the "ugh" from town names ending in "borough," so Wardsborough was thereafter known as Wardsboro.

Wardsboro was one of thirteen Vermont towns isolated by flooding caused by Hurricane Irene in 2011, and it was the last of those towns to be released from its isolation.

In April 2016, the Vermont State Legislature voted to make the Gilfeather Turnip the Official Vermont State Vegetable. This unusual hybrid, dating back to the early 1900s, is credited to Farmer John Gilfeather of the Gilfeather Farm in Wardsboro.

== Community Events ==
The two largest community events annually are the 4th of July Street Fair and Parade, always held on the 4th of July regardless of what day of the week the holiday falls on, and the Gilfeather Turnip Festival at the end of October.

== Geography ==
According to the United States Census Bureau, the town has a total area of 29.3 square miles (75.8 km^{2}), all land. It is drained by Wardsboro Brook, a tributary of the West River.

Set in the Green Mountains, much of Wardsboro is included in the Green Mountain National Forest. The town is approximately six miles north of Mount Snow ski area and less than 10 miles south of Stratton ski area. Somerset Reservoir and Grout Pond are only a few minutes away, and the Vermont Association of Snow Travelers Snowmobile trails run through the town.

Wardsboro is crossed by Vermont Route 100.

=== Climate ===
This climatic region is typified by large seasonal temperature differences, with warm to hot (and often humid) summers and cold (sometimes severely cold) winters. According to the Köppen Climate Classification system, Wardsboro has a humid continental climate, abbreviated "Dfb" on climate maps.

== Demographics ==
Historical population
Census	Pop.	Note	%±
1790	753		—
1800	1,484		97.1%
1810	1,159		−21.9%
1820	1,016		−12.3%
1830	1,148		13.0%
1840	1,102		−4.0%
1850	1,125		2.1%
1860	1,004		−10.8%
1870	866		−13.7%
1880	766		−11.5%
1890	704		−8.1%
1900	637		−9.5%
1910	559		−12.2%
1920	380		−32.0%
1930	355		−6.6%
1940	401		13.0%
1950	377		−6.0%
1960	322		−14.6%
1970	391		21.4%
1980	505		29.2%
1990	654		29.5%
2000	854		30.6%
2010	900		5.4%
2020	869		−3.4%
U.S. Decennial Census

As of the census of 2010, there were 900 people, 374 households, and 242 families living in the town. The population density was 30.7 people per square mile (11.8/km^{2}). The racial makeup of the town was 97.5% White (97% Non-Hispanic White), 1.2% African American, .1% Hawaiian and 1.1% from two or more races. Hispanic or Latino of any race were .5% of the population.

As of the census of 2000, there were 854 people, 358 households, and 234 families living in the town. The population density was 29.2 people per square mile (11.3/km^{2}). There were 766 housing units at an average density of 26.2 per square mile (10.1/km^{2}). The racial makeup of the town was 98.48% White, 0.35% African American, 0.47% Native American, 0.12% Asian, and 0.59% from two or more races. Hispanic or Latino of any race were 0.59% of the population.

There were 358 households, out of which 28.8% had children under the age of 18 living with them, 54.5% were married couples living together, 6.4% had a female householder with no husband present, and 34.4% were non-families. 27.1% of all households were made up of individuals, and 9.2% had someone living alone who was 65 years of age or older. The average household size was 2.39 and the average family size was 2.91.

In the town, the population was spread out, with 23.7% under the age of 18, 6.6% from 18 to 24, 28.5% from 25 to 44, 30.1% from 45 to 64, and 11.2% who were 65 years of age or older. The median age was 41 years. For every 100 females, there were 109.3 males. For every 100 females age 18 and over, there were 107.0 males.

The median income for a household in the town was $35,000, and the median income for a family was $43,333. Males had a median income of $28,083 versus $22,656 for females. The per capita income for the town was $17,165. About 4.1% of families and 7.6% of the population were below the poverty line, including 6.2% of those under age 18 and 16.2% of those age 65 or over.

== Notable people ==
- Augustus F. Allen, US congressman from New York
- Herbert G. Barber, Vermont Attorney General
- Clarke C. Fitts, Vermont Attorney General
- Abner Hazeltine, US congressman
- Marshall Otis Howe, Vermont state legislator
- Mary Eddy Kidder, missionary and educator in Japan
- Miles Justice Knowlton, clergyman and missionary
