= Albert Smith (New York politician) =

American politician

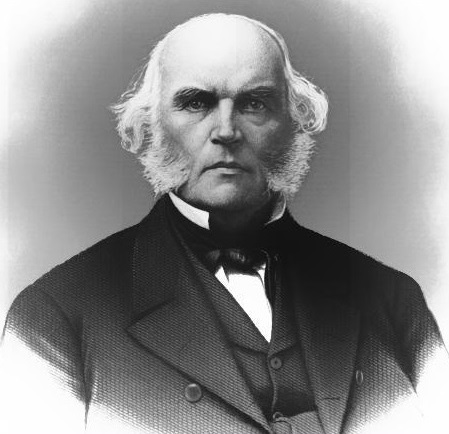
- Albert Smith, New York Congressman, Wisconsin Judge

Member of the U.S. House of Representatives from New York's 33rd district
- In office March 4, 1843 – March 3, 1847
- Preceded by: Alfred Babcock
- Succeeded by: Harvey Putnam

Personal details
- Born: June 22, 1805 Cooperstown, New York, U.S.
- Died: August 28, 1870 (aged 65) Milwaukee, Wisconsin, U.S.
- Resting place: Forest Home Cemetery; Milwaukee, Wisconsin
- Party: Whig
- Spouse: Elizabeth Stevens Smith
- Profession: Lawyer; Judge; Politician

Albert Smith (22 June 1805 – 28 August 1870) was an American politician, a judge, and a U.S. Representative from New York.

== Early life ==
Born in Cooperstown, New York, Smith completed preparatory studies and moved to Batavia, New York, where he studied law. He was admitted to the bar and practiced law in Batavia.

== Career ==
Smith held several local offices and served as member of the New York State Assembly in 1840.

Elected as a Whig to the Twenty-eighth and Twenty-ninth Congresses, Smith served as United States Representative for the 33rd district of New York from (4 March 1843 – 3 March 1847).

Smith moved to Milwaukee, Wisconsin in 1849, where he resumed the practice of law. He was a Justice of the Peace 1851-1859 and served as judge of the Milwaukee County Court 1859-1870.

== Death ==
Smith died in Milwaukee, Wisconsin, August 28, 1870 (age 65 years, 66 days). He is interred at Forest Home Cemetery.

U.S. House of Representatives
Preceded by Alfred Babcock	Member of the U.S. House of Representatives from New York's 33rd congressional district 1843–1847	Succeeded by Harvey Putnam
