= Charles A. Talcott =

American politician (1857–1920)

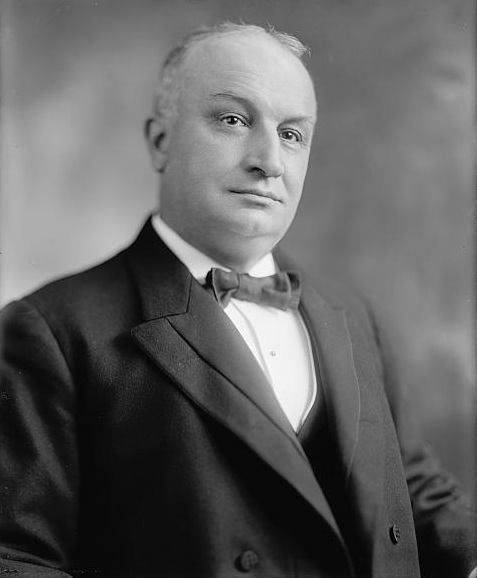

Member of the U.S. House of Representatives from New York
- In office March 4, 1911 – March 3, 1915
- Preceded by: Charles S. Millington
- Succeeded by: Homer P. Snyder
- Constituency: 27th district (1911–1913); 33rd district (1913–1915)

Personal details
- Born: June 10, 1857 Oswego, New York, U.S.
- Died: February 27, 1920 (aged 62) Utica, New York, U.S.
- Resting place: Forest Hill Cemetery; Utica, New York, U.S.
- Party: Democratic

Charles Andrew Talcott (June 10, 1857 – February 27, 1920) was an American politician who served one term as a Democratic member of the U.S. House of Representatives from New York from 1913 to 1915.

== Biography ==
Talcott was born in Oswego, New York. He graduated from Princeton University in 1879. He was mayor of Utica, New York from 1902 until 1906.

=== Congress ===
He was elected to Congress in 1910 and served from March 4, 1911, until March 3, 1915.

=== Death and burial ===
He died in Utica and was interred in Forest Hill Cemetery.

== Sources ==
- United States Congress. "Charles A. Talcott (id: T000023)". Biographical Directory of the United States Congress.

U.S. House of Representatives
Preceded by Charles S. Millington	Member of the U.S. House of Representatives from New York's 27th congressional district 1911–1913	Succeeded by George McClellan
Preceded by Edwin S. Underhill	Member of the U.S. House of Representatives from New York's 33rd congressional district 1913–1915	Succeeded by Homer P. Snyder
