= Alfred Babcock =

American politician

Member of the U.S. House of Representatives from New York's 33rd district
- In office March 4, 1841 – March 3, 1843
- Preceded by: Charles F. Mitchell
- Succeeded by: Albert Smith

Personal details
- Born: April 15, 1805 Hamilton, New York, US
- Died: May 16, 1871 (aged 66) Galesburg, Illinois, US
- Party: Whig
- Education: Gains Academy, New York
- Profession: Physician; politician

Alfred Babcock (April 15, 1805 – May 16, 1871) was an American physician, politician, and a U.S. Representative from New York's thirty-third district.

== Biography ==
Born in Hamilton, New York, Babcock attended the local schools. He also attended the Gaines (New York) Academy. He studied medicine and became a physician.

== Career ==
Babcock moved to Gaines, New York, where he practiced his profession. He was elected a member of the board of trustees of the village of Gaines at its first election on May 28, 1839.

Elected as a Whig to the Twenty-seventh Congress as a U.S. Representative for New York's thirty-third district, Babcock served from March 4, 1841, to March 3, 1843. He resumed the practice of medicine in Gaines, New York, when his term was over.

In 1850, Babcock moved to Illinois and settled in Galesburg, Illinois, where he continued the practice of his profession until his death in 1871.

== Death ==
Babcock died in Galesburg on May 16, 1871 (age 66 years, 31 days). He is interred at Hope Cemetery, Galesburg, Illinois.

U.S. House of Representatives
Preceded by Charles F. Mitchell	Member of the U.S. House of Representatives from New York's 33rd congressional district 1841–1843	Succeeded by Albert Smith
