= Charles F. Mitchell =

American politician

Charles Mitchell

Member of the U.S. House of Representatives from New York's 33rd district
- In office March 4, 1837 – March 3, 1841
- Preceded by: Gideon Hard
- Succeeded by: Alfred Babcock

Personal details
- Born: Charles Franklin Mitchell; February 18, 1806 Middletown Township, Pennsylvania, US
- Died: September 27, 1865 (aged 59) Cincinnati, Ohio, US
- Resting place: Spring Grove Cemetery, Cincinnati, Ohio, US
- Party: Whig (Before 1856); Republican (1856–1865)
- Spouse: Elizabeth F. Ellis (m. 1829)
- Children: 3
- Occupation: Grain miller

Charles Franklin Mitchell (February 18, 1806 – September 27, 1865) was a U.S. representative from New York in the Twenty-fifth and Twenty-sixth Congresses.

== Early life ==
Mitchell was born in Middletown Township, Bucks County, Pennsylvania, on February 18, 1806, the son of Walter Mitchell and Hannah (Comly) Mitchell. A Quaker, he attended the public schools in Pennsylvania and became a journeyman miller. He settled in Lockport, New York, in 1828 or 1829, operated a successful grain milling business, and was appointed to the volunteer fire department in 1829. He was also active in other business ventures, including the Batavia and Lockport Railroad and the Niagara Suspension Bridge Bank.

On December 2, 1829, he married Elizabeth F. Ellis in Henrietta, New York. She was born in Princeton, New Jersey, on October 23, 1809, and died in Cincinnati, Ohio, on February 24, 1898. According to the 1850 U.S. Census, they were the parents of three children— Pierson, Mary, and Josephine.

== Continued career ==
Active as a Whig, he was an early protege and business partner of Thurlow Weed. In 1836 he was elected to the U.S. House as the Representative of New York's 33rd District. He was reelected in 1838 and served from March 4, 1837, to March 3, 1841.

During his second term, Mitchell was accused of not devoting his full attention to the business of Congress, and of not spending time in his district. He was convicted of forgery later in 1841, and sentenced to one year in prison and a fine, but paroled for ill health, and later pardoned.

== Later career ==
He later lived in Cincinnati and northern Kentucky. By the time of the American Civil War, Mitchell had established himself in Flemingsburg, Kentucky. By now a Republican, in 1860 and 1861 he sent letters to Abraham Lincoln and others in Lincoln's administration, in which he described the Kentucky political situation and the prospects for success at keeping the state in the Union.

Later in the war Mitchell was part of a delegation that lobbied Secretary of State William H. Seward for the release of individuals from the Flemingsburg area who were being held prisoner for suspected Confederate sympathies, with Mitchell taking part because he was personally acquainted with Seward from their time as Whig politicians in New York.

== Death and burial ==
Mitchell died in Cincinnati, Ohio, on September 27, 1865. He was buried at Spring Grove Cemetery in Cincinnati.

U.S. House of Representatives
Preceded by Gideon Hard	Member of the U.S. House of Representatives from New York's 33rd congressional district 1837–1841	Succeeded by Alfred Babcock
