= Fred Sisson =

American politician

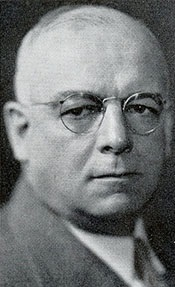
From 1935's Pictorial Directory of 74th Congress

Frederick James Sisson (March 31, 1879 – October 20, 1949) was an American educator, lawyer, and politician who served two terms as a United States representative from New York from 1933 to 1937.

== Biography ==
Born in Wells Bridge, Otsego County, New York, he attended the public schools at Unadilla and was graduated from Hamilton College in 1904. He was principal of Vernon High School from 1904 to 1910, studied law, was admitted to the bar in 1911 and commenced practice in Utica.

He was sheriff's attorney in 1913 and corporation counsel for the city of Utica in 1914. In 1922, he was an unsuccessful candidate for election up to the 68th United States Congress and in 1928 to the 71st United States Congress. He was member of the Whitesboro Board of Education from 1925 to 1933, serving as president from 1926 to 1930.

=== Congress ===
Sisson was elected as a Democrat to the 73rd and 74th Congresses, holding office from March 4, 1933, to January 3, 1937. He was an unsuccessful candidate for reelection in 1936 to the 75th Congress.

=== Later career and death ===
After Congress, he continued the practice of law in Utica and Washington, D.C., until his retirement in 1945.

In 1949 he died in Washington, D.C., and was interred in Mount Olivet Cemetery in Whitesboro.

U.S. House of Representatives
Preceded by Frederick M. Davenport	Member of the U.S. House of Representatives from New York's 33rd congressional district 1933–1937	Succeeded by Fred J. Douglas
