= Bertrand Snell =

American politician

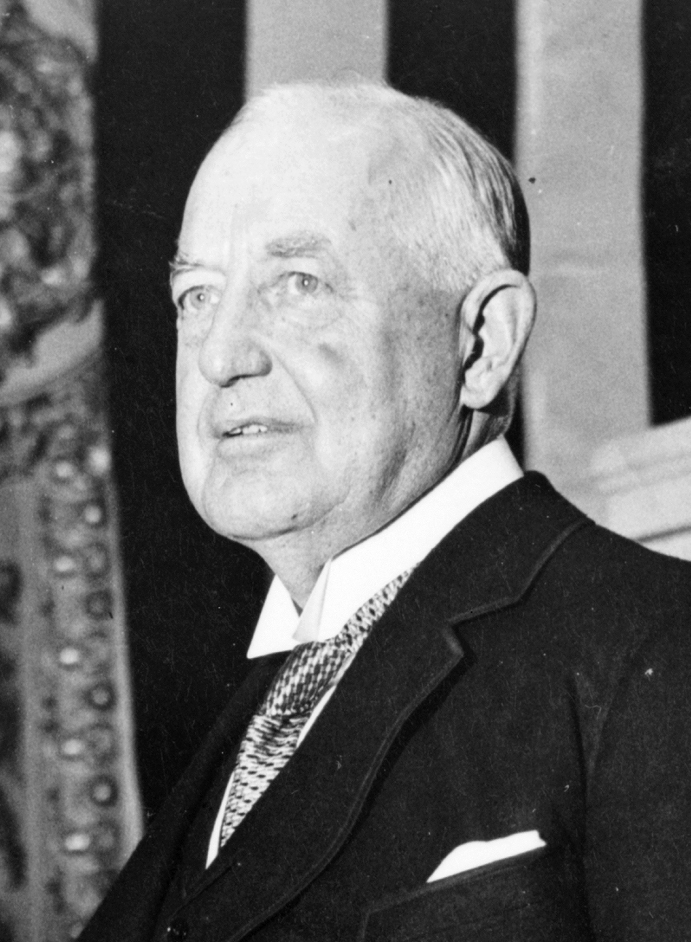

House Minority Leader
- In office March 4, 1931 – January 3, 1939
- Preceded by: John Nance Garner
- Succeeded by: Joseph W. Martin Jr.

Leader of the House Republican Conference
- In office March 4, 1931 – January 3, 1939
- Preceded by: Nicholas Longworth
- Succeeded by: Joseph W. Martin Jr.

Chairman of the House Rules Committee
- In office March 4, 1923 – March 4, 1931
- Speaker: Frederick H. Gillett; Nicholas Longworth
- Preceded by: Philip P. Campbell
- Succeeded by: Edward W. Pou

Member of the U.S. House of Representatives from New York's 31st district
- In office November 2, 1915 – January 3, 1939
- Preceded by: Edwin A. Merritt
- Succeeded by: Wallace E. Pierce

Personal details
- Born: Bertrand Hollis Snell; December 9, 1870 Colton, New York, U.S.
- Died: February 2, 1958 (aged 87) Potsdam, New York, U.S.
- Party: Republican
- Education: Amherst College

Bertrand Hollis Snell (December 9, 1870 – February 2, 1958) was an American politician who represented upstate New York in the United States House of Representatives.

== U.S. Congressman ==
Elected in 1915 to the House of Representatives from upstate New York's Thirty-first district, Snell, a Republican, served in Congress until he retired in 1939. He was intensely loyal to the regular Republican leaders, only deviating from this fidelity when constituent interests were at stake. Early in his congressional service he offered a bill to make the St. Lawrence River more navigable, which he pursued unsuccessfully for the rest of his days in Congress. When the Saint Lawrence Seaway finally came to fruition during the Dwight D. Eisenhower administration, one of its locks was named after Snell. According to his biographer, Louis A. Barone, Snell, throughout his congressional career, generally opposed federal regulatory interference in the private sector and big spending programs.

== House Committee Chairman ==
In 1923 Snell became chairman of the important House Rules Committee. This position gave him great power in Congress and the Republican party, because he was in a position to frame legislation and legislative strategy. When Nicholas Longworth ascended to the Speakership and John Q. Tilson became majority floor leader in 1925, they, along with Snell, effectively controlled in concert the House of Representatives. Snell's first job as chairman of the Rules Committee was to fend off a challenge by insurgent Republicans and Democrats to ease restrictions on discharge petitions. Snell helped fashion a compromise that allowed regular Republican leaders a modicum of control.

When Longworth became Speaker in 1925, the Old Guard reestablished its dominance in the lower chamber. In this, the regular Republicans were aided by Snell's Rules Committee in restricting Democrats and insurgent Republicans from interfering with President Calvin Coolidge's program of spending cuts and tax reduction. To Democrats' complaints that Snell was too restrictive with the rules, the New Yorker responded that the opposition would undoubtedly do the same if and when they came back to power in the House—which they did. During these years Snell also played a role as a go-between for Congress and his college friend from Amherst, President Coolidge. This was not always a popular job, especially when differences arose between the president and Congress.

Snell backed Herbert Hoover for the 1928 GOP presidential nomination, albeit somewhat unenthusiastically. He would have preferred for President Calvin Coolidge to run for another term. Snell's relations with the engineer president soured slightly when Hoover tried unsuccessfully to seize the initiative in New York patronage. Snell's dream of eventually becoming Speaker was dashed with the onset of the Great Depression. In the wake of the 1930 midterm elections, the Republicans lost control of the House. After Longworth died in April 1931, Tilson and Snell tussled for the job of minority leader. Despite being favored by the president, Tilson lost the race to Snell, who appealed to both the Old Guard and to the insurgents. Tilson was too closely associated with the increasingly unpopular Hoover, and Snell had made some concessions to the progressive Republicans.

== Later career ==
With Hoover's landslide defeat and the advent of the New Deal, Snell spent the rest of his days in Congress fighting the liberal programs of Franklin D. Roosevelt.

His initial reaction to the New Deal was one of cautious but critical cooperation. Snell, in the midst of the economic crisis, supported some early measures of the New Deal, such as the 1933 Emergency Banking Act and the 1933 Economy Act, but he came out in cautious, conservative opposition to most of the president's program. He opposed the Agricultural Adjustment Act, the Elmer Thomas amendment favoring inflation, the Reciprocal Trade Agreements Act, and other early New Deal measures.

During the Court-packing battle of 1937, Snell agreed with Senate GOP leaders to allow the overwhelming Democratic majority to fight amongst themselves, which they did, sinking the plan. The so-called Roosevelt recession of 1937 also encouraged Snell and other conservatives to step up their resistance to the New Deal. In late 1937, Snell introduced legislation for a tax cut, and during the special session of Congress in the same year, Republicans and southern Democrats combined to recommit Roosevelt's Fair Labor Standards Bill, although it was enacted in the next session.

In 1938 Snell and the GOP minority successfully opposed Roosevelt's original executive branch reorganization plan, and the midterm elections that year were a triumph for the GOP, as they flipped 82 Democratic seats and nearly doubled the size of the Republican House delegation. However, because of declining eyesight and hearing, and his belief that the Republicans would be unable to retake the House in the near future (this would not happen until 1946), Snell decided to retire.

After his retirement in 1939, he became publisher of the Potsdam Courier-Freeman, which he had bought five years earlier, and in 1941 became owner and manager of the New York State Oil Company, of Kansas. After his death in Potsdam, New York, in 1958, he was interred in Bayside Cemetery.

Bertrand H. Snell Hall at Clarkson University is named in his honor.

== Sources ==
- United States Congress. "Bertrand Snell (id: S000652)". Biographical Directory of the United States Congress.

U.S. House of Representatives
Preceded by Edwin A. Merritt	Member of the U.S. House of Representatives from New York's 31st congressional district 1915–1939	Succeeded by Wallace E. Pierce
