= Wardsboro (CDP), Vermont =

Census-designated place in Vermont, United States

Wardsboro, Vermont
- Census-designated place
- Location within Vermont Location within the United States
- Coordinates: 43°02′37″N 72°47′20″W
- Country: United States
- State: Vermont
- County: Windham
- Town: Wardsboro

Area
  - Total: 0.12 sq mi (0.30 km^{2})
  - Land: 0.11 sq mi (0.29 km^{2})
  - Water: 0.0039 sq mi (0.01 km^{2})
- Elevation: 968 ft (295 m)

Population (2020)
  - Total: 70
- Time zone: UTC-5 (Eastern (EST))
  - Summer (DST): UTC-4 (EDT)
- ZIP Code: 05355
- Area code: 802
- FIPS code: 50-76150
- GNIS feature ID: 2807166

Wardsboro is the primary village and a census-designated place (CDP) in the town of Wardsboro, Windham County, Vermont, United States. As of the 2020 census, it had a population of 70, compared to 869 in the entire town.

The CDP is in west-central Windham County on the eastern side of the Green Mountains, in the northern part of the town of Wardsboro. It sits in the valley of Wardsboro Brook, a northeast-flowing tributary of the West River and part of the Connecticut River watershed. Vermont Route 100 passes through the village, leading northeast 4.5 miles (7.2 km) to Vermont Route 30 in East Jamaica and south 18 miles (29 km) to Vermont Route 9 in Wilmington.
