= Dean P. Taylor =

American politician (1902–1977)

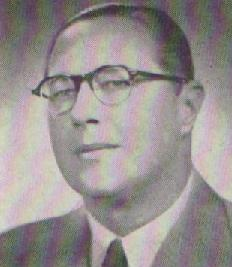
- From 1959's Pocket Congressional Directory of the Eighty-Sixth Congress

Member of the United States House of Representatives from New York
- In office January 3, 1943 – January 3, 1961
- Preceded by: E. Harold Cluett
- Succeeded by: Carleton J. King
- Constituency: 37th district (1943–1945); 33rd district (1945–1953); 27th district (1953–1961)

Chairman of the New York Republican State Committee
- In office September 1953 – September 1954
- Preceded by: William L. Pfeiffer
- Succeeded by: L. Judson Morhouse

Personal details
- Born: January 1, 1902 Troy, New York, US
- Died: October 16, 1977 (aged 75) Albany, New York, US
- Resting place: Oakwood Cemetery, Troy, New York
- Party: Republican
- Spouse: Mary S. Hayford (m. 1928-1977, his death)
- Relations: John P. Taylor (father); Donald S. Taylor (brother)
- Children: 1
- Education: Colgate University; Albany Law School
- Profession: Attorney

Dean Park Taylor (January 1, 1902 – October 16, 1977) was an American attorney and politician from Troy, New York. A Republican, he was most notable for his service as a United States Congressman for 18 years (1943–1961) and chairman of the New York Republican State Committee (1953–1954).

A native of Troy, Taylor attended the local schools and Colgate University. He then began attendance at Albany Law School, from which he graduated in 1926. After working as a law clerk for a U.S. district court judge and an Assistant United States Attorney, in 1931 Taylor went into practice in Troy with his father and brother.

Long active in the Republican Party, Taylor was chairman of the Rensselaer County Republican Committee from 1938 to 1952, and was a delegate to the 1940 Republican National Convention. In 1942 he was elected to the United States House of Representatives. He was reelected eight times and served from January 3, 1943, to January 3, 1961. Taylor did not run for reelection in 1960.

From 1953 to 1954, he served as chairman of the New York Republican State Committee. He was a member of the Republican National Committee From 1954 to 1959.

Taylor died in Albany, New York on October 16, 1977. He was buried at Oakwood Cemetery in Troy.

== Early life ==
Dean P. Taylor was born in Troy, New York, on January 1, 1902, a son of John P. Taylor and Jessie (Simmons) Taylor. He attended the Troy public schools and Colgate University. In 1926, Taylor received his LL.B. degree from Albany Law School.

== Career ==
Taylor was admitted to the bar in 1926, and was employed as a law clerk for federal judge Frank Cooper. Taylor served as Assistant United States Attorney for the Northern District of New York from 1927 to 1930. He then commenced practice in Troy with his father, former Rensselaer County District Attorney John P. Taylor, and brother, Donald S. Taylor who served as a justice of the New York Supreme Court and a justice of the New York Supreme Court, Appellate Division.

From 1938 to 1952, Taylor was chairman of the Rensselaer County Republican Committee. He was a delegate to the 1940 Republican National Convention. Taylor was also chairman of the New York State Republican Committee from 1953 to 1954. From 1954 to 1959, he was a member of the Republican National Committee.

Taylor was involved in business and banking, including serving as a director of the Niagara Mohawk Power Corporation, chairman of the board of Capital Cities Television and chairman of the board of the Union National Bank of Troy. He was also involved in education and civic causes; he was a trustee of both Hudson Valley Community College and Russell Sage College, and a trustee or director of Vanderheyden Hall, Troy Boys Club, Fort Ticonderoga Museum, and Troy's Leonard Hospital.

Taylor also belonged to the Phi Kappa Psi fraternity, Sons of the American Revolution, and was an honorary member of the Fleet Reserve Association. In 1959, he was a member of the Hudson-Champlain Celebration Commission, which planned activities to commemorate the 350th anniversary of Henry Hudson's and Samuel de Champlain's explorations of what became New York state.

== U.S. Congressman ==
Taylor was elected to the U.S. House of Representatives in 1942 as a Republican. He was reelected eight times and served in the Seventy-eighth and the eight succeeding Congresses, January 3, 1943, to January 3, 1961.

In Congress, Taylor served on several committees, including Judiciary and Public Lands. He was also on the subcommittee of the Public Lands Committee that evaluated Hawaii for statehood. Commencing in 1946, Taylor travelled to Hawaii, conducted hearings, and briefed President Harry S. Truman and Secretary of the Interior Harold L. Ickes on his findings. The Hawaii Admission Act was passed in 1959, and Hawaii joined the Union as the 50th state. Taylor also opposed racial discrimination and voted in favor of the Civil Rights Acts of 1957 and 1960.

As a prominent Republican leader, Taylor was a confidant of Thomas E. Dewey, Dwight D. Eisenhower, and Richard M. Nixon. During Dewey's governorship and Eisenhower's presidency, both often turned to Taylor for recommendations on executive appointments, as well as assistance with candidate recruiting and campaign organizing.

== Later life ==
Taylor was not a candidate for reelection in 1960. On September 30, 1960 Vice President Richard M. Nixon, then campaigning for the presidency, attended Taylor's retirement celebration at Troy's Hendrick Hudson Hotel. Other prominent attendees included Senator Kenneth B. Keating and Lieutenant Governor Malcolm Wilson.

Taylor died in Albany, New York on October 16, 1977. He was interred at Oakwood Cemetery in Troy.

The Veterans of Foreign Wars twice awarded Taylor their Certificate of Merit for Service to Veterans. Taylor's papers are held by the Rensselaer County Historical Society (RCHS) in Troy. The RCHS also hosts the Dean P. Taylor Research Library and Archives, which opened in 1993.

== Family ==
In 1928, Taylor married Mary S. Hayford (1901–1992). They were the parents of a son, Peter Taylor (1931–2007).

U.S. House of Representatives
Preceded by E. Harold Cluett	Member of the U.S. House of Representatives from New York's 29th congressional district 1943–1945	Succeeded by Augustus W. Bennet
Preceded by Fred J. Douglas	Member of the U.S. House of Representatives from New York's 33rd congressional district 1945–1953	Succeeded by Clarence E. Kilburn
Preceded by Bernard W. Kearney	Member of the U.S. House of Representatives from New York's 31st congressional district 1953–1961	Succeeded by Carleton J. King
Party political offices
Preceded by William L. Pfeiffer	Chairman of the New York Republican State Committee; September 1953 – September 1954	Succeeded by L. Judson Morhouse
