= Nelson I. Norton =

American politician

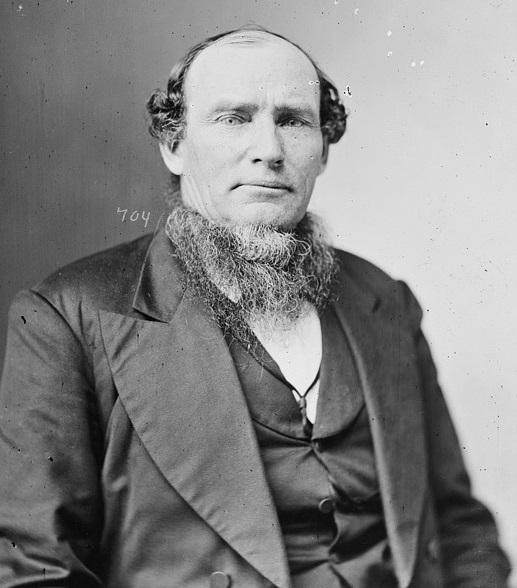
- Nelson I. Norton, Congressman from New York

Member of the U.S. House of Representatives from New York's 33rd district
- In office December 6, 1875 – March 3, 1877
- Preceded by: District re-established
- Succeeded by: George W. Patterson

New York State Assembly
- In office 1861–1862

Personal details
- Born: March 30, 1820 near Salamanca, Great Valley, New York, U.S.
- Died: October 28, 1887 (aged 67) Hinsdale, New York, U.S.
- Resting place: Hinsdale Cemetery, Maplehurst, Cattaraugus County, New York, U.S.
- Party: Republican
- Spouse: Mary E. Parker Norton
- Profession: Farmer; Politician

Nelson Ira Norton (March 30, 1820 – October 28, 1887) was an American politician and a United States Representative from New York.

== Early life ==
Born near Salamanca, in Great Valley, New York, Norton received a limited education and engaged in agricultural pursuits.

== Career ==
Supervisor of Cattaraugus County in 1860 and 1865–1867, Norton was a Justice of the Peace from 1852 to 1870. He was a member of the New York State Assembly (Cattaraugus Co., 1st D.) in 1861 and 1862.

Norton was elected as a Republican to the 44th United States Congress to fill the vacancy caused by the death of Representative-elect Augustus F. Allen, holding office from December 6, 1875 to March 3, 1877. Afterwards he resumed agricultural pursuits.

According to Mary Ermina Norton (Parker)'s obituary published June 30, 1911, (Wyoming County Herald, NY) Mary taught at Great Valley, NY, and it was here that she met Nelson Ira Norton whom she married 7 years later June 23, 1847. Norton formed a partnership with Alonzo Hawley in general merchandise. Mr. Norton was one of the first postmasters of the Town of Hinsdale, NY serving under James K. Polk and Zachary Taylor. He was a member of the Assembly from this district in 1861, and in 1872 was one of the presidential [ electors ]. He also served the legislature in 1872 to 1874. He was supervisor of the town of Hinsdale in the Years 1860-61-65-66-69. He was Justice of the Peace for 20 consecutive years and was serving the town in this capacity at the time of his death.

== Death ==
Norton died on October 28, 1887 (age 67 years, 7 months, and 28 days). He is interred at the Hinsdale Cemetery, Hinsdale, New York.

== Family life ==
Norton was the son of Ira and Lucy Perkins Norton. He married Mary E. Parker on February 15, 1847.

New York State Assembly
Preceded by Ulysses P. Crane	New York State Assembly; Cattaraugus County, 1st District; 1861–1862	Succeeded by Andrew L. Allen
U.S. House of Representatives
Preceded by District re-established	Member of the U.S. House of Representatives from New York's 33rd congressional district 1875–1877	Succeeded by George W. Patterson
