= West Wardsboro, Vermont =

- Village
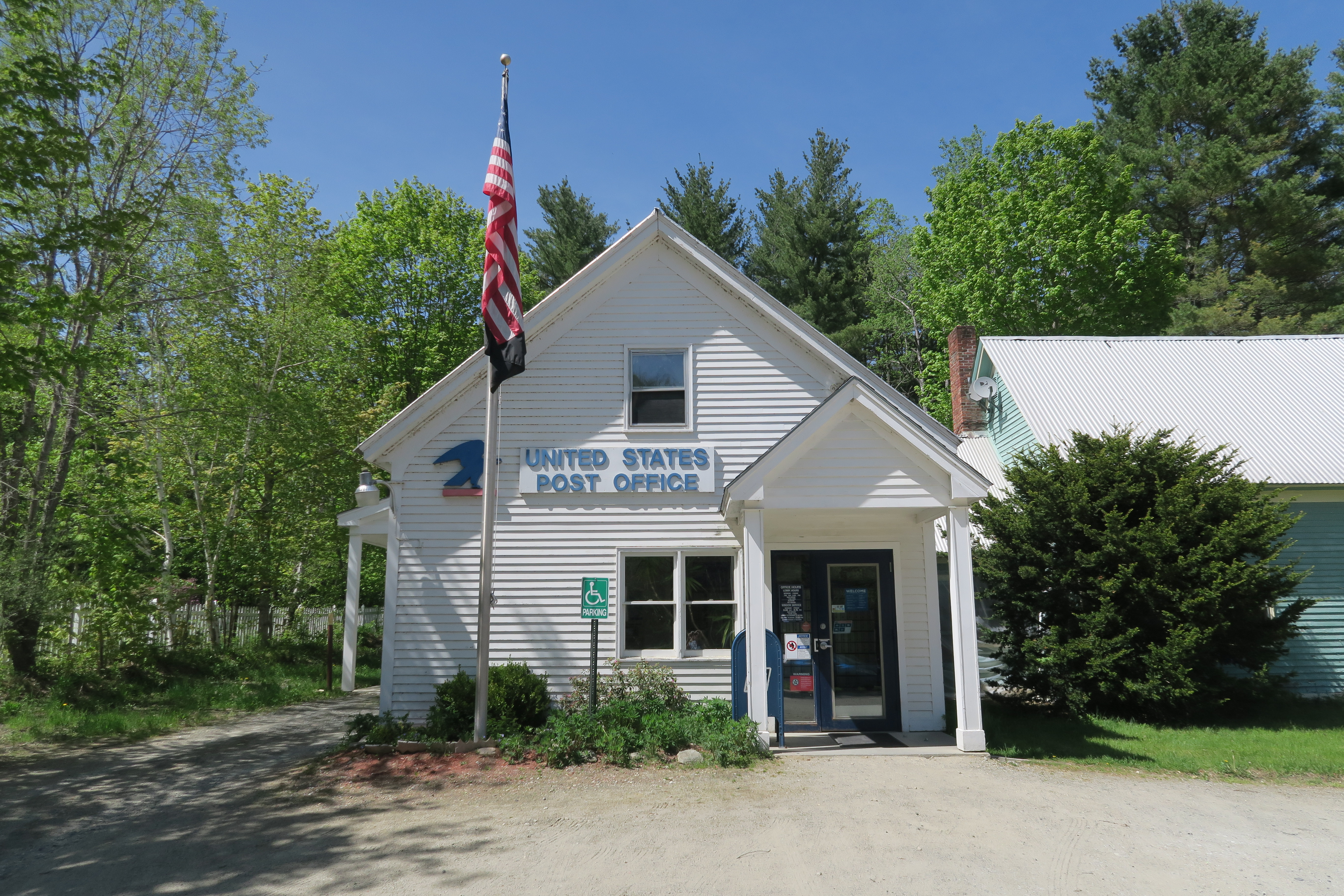
- Post Office

- Location within Vermont
- Coordinates: 43°01′46″N 72°51′09″W
- Country: United States
- State: Vermont
- County: Windham
- Elevation: 1,444 ft (440 m)
- Time zone: UTC-5 (Eastern (EST))
  - Summer (DST): UTC-4 (EDT)
- ZIP code: 05360
- Area code: 802
- GNIS feature ID: 1461598

West Wardsboro is an unincorporated village in the town of Wardsboro, Windham County, Vermont, United States. The community is located along Vermont Route 100, 19.5 miles (31.4 km) northwest of Brattleboro. West Wardsboro has a post office with ZIP code 05360.

== Climate ==
Climate data for West Wardsboro 43.0334 N, 72.8445 W, Elevation: 1,410 ft (430 m) (1991–2020 normals)
Month	Jan	Feb	Mar	Apr	May	Jun	Jul	Aug	Sep	Oct	Nov	Dec	Year
Mean daily maximum °F (°C)	28.5 (−1.9)	31.1 (−0.5)	39.0 (3.9)	52.0 (11.1)	64.6 (18.1)	72.9 (22.7)	77.5 (25.3)	76.0 (24.4)	69.1 (20.6)	56.7 (13.7)	44.7 (7.1)	33.8 (1.0)	53.8 (12.1)
Daily mean °F (°C)	19.2 (−7.1)	20.7 (−6.3)	28.7 (−1.8)	41.2 (5.1)	53.0 (11.7)	61.7 (16.5)	66.4 (19.1)	64.6 (18.1)	57.5 (14.2)	46.0 (7.8)	35.6 (2.0)	25.4 (−3.7)	43.3 (6.3)
Mean daily minimum °F (°C)	9.8 (−12.3)	10.2 (−12.1)	18.3 (−7.6)	30.3 (−0.9)	41.4 (5.2)	50.4 (10.2)	55.3 (12.9)	53.2 (11.8)	45.9 (7.7)	35.4 (1.9)	26.5 (−3.1)	17.0 (−8.3)	32.8 (0.5)
Average precipitation inches (mm)	4.67 (119)	3.61 (92)	4.52 (115)	4.28 (109)	4.50 (114)	5.48 (139)	4.36 (111)	4.85 (123)	4.50 (114)	5.86 (149)	4.55 (116)	5.03 (128)	56.21 (1,429)
Average snowfall inches (cm)	33.20 (84.3)	28.80 (73.2)	24.60 (62.5)	6.10 (15.5)	0.20 (0.51)	0.00 (0.00)	0.00 (0.00)	0.00 (0.00)	0.00 (0.00)	2.20 (5.6)	8.40 (21.3)	26.70 (67.8)	130.2 (330.71)
Source 1: PRISM Climate Group
Source 2: NOAA (precipitation & snowfall)
