= George Delancey Harris =

American businessman

- Born: October 21, 1892; Reading, Pennsylvania, U.S.
- Died: December 10, 1958 (aged 66); New York City, New York, U.S.
- Education: Morristown School
- Alma mater: Harvard University
- Employer(s): D.P. Harris Hardware and Manufacturing Company
- Spouse: Susan Katherine Lovejoy
- Children: George D. Harris, Jr. Thomas Lovejoy Harris
- Parent(s): Delancey P. Harris; Mary May
- Awards: Croix de Guerre

George Delancey Harris (October 21, 1892 – December 10, 1958) was an American business executive. Harris served as chairman and president of D.P. Harris Hardware and Manufacturing Company, an early bicycling manufacturer. He assumed leadership from his father, Delancey P. Harris, who founded the company in 1895.

== Early life and education ==
Harris was born in Reading, Pennsylvania, on October 21, 1892. He was the son of DeLancey P. Harris and Mary May Harris. Harris descended directly from colonial merchant Stephen Delancey and Lieutenant Governor James De Lancey. Recognizing his heritage, Harris participated in the Saint Nicholas Society in the City of New York for descendants of the state's early inhabitants. He received induction into the society on March 4, 1940.

He graduated from the Morristown School (now Morristown-Beard School) in Morristown, New Jersey, in 1914. Harris then completed his bachelor's degree at Harvard University in Cambridge, Massachusetts.

== Career ==
During World War I, Harris drove an ambulance for Section 30 of the American Field Service in France. He assisted the French Army at the second offensive of the Battle of Verdun and the Chemin des Dames front. On October 8, 1917, Harris enlisted as a private with Section 632 of the United States Army Ambulance Service. He assisted Allied Forces at the Somme Defensive, the Alsac-Lorraine front, Chemin des Dames, the Second Battle of the Marne, and the Meuse-Argonne Offensive. In 1918, Harris sent a letter to his father to share news of the turning of the war for the Allied Forces. Recognizing his service efforts, France awarded Harris their Croix de Guerre.

=== Bicycling manufacture ===
The D.P. Harris Hardware and Manufacturing Company, Inc. was founded in 1895 (incorporated 1907) by DeLancey P. Harris in New York City, New York. Harris originated the "Rollfast" bicycle name in the 1890s. In the early 1900s, Harris teamed up with the H.P. Snyder Manufacturing Company, Snyder being the primary manufacturer of the bicycles, with Harris providing some parts and doing the marketing.

At their peak before World War II, Westfield (Columbia) and Rollfast sold 75% of bikes in the US. During the 1940s and 1950s, Harris helped lead D. P. Harris to prominence as one of the largest manufacturers of bicycles and roller skates in the U.S. He brought innovations in the styling for bicycles, including the western styling of the Hopalong Cassidy Rollfast bicycle. Named after the first cowboy show on TV, the bike carried an endorsement from actor William Boyd. Originally sold for $65, private collectors now sell the Hopalong Cassidy bicycle for $6000 to $10,000 (depending on the condition of a specific item).

=== George D. Harris Foundation ===
Harris founded the George D. Harris Foundation in 1947. For several decades, the foundation provided financial assistance for educational, medical, and religious initiatives. Harris served on its Board of Trustees from 1946 to 1959.

=== Board service and educational advocacy ===
Harris served as a member of the board of trustees of New York Life Insurance Company for 30 years. He also served as vice president and a trustee of Education for Freedom, and as a trustee of Salisbury School in Salisbury, Connecticut.

== Personal life ==
George married Susan Katherine Lovejoy whose father was Thomas Eugene Lovejoy, Sr. They had two sons together who ran D.P. Harris Hardware and Manufacturing after their father's death.:

- George D. Harris, Jr. (April 21, 1925 - Dec. 7, 2007), who married Joanna Primrose Cochrane (January 28, 1922 - March 8, 2008), the daughter of Frank Cochrane and Eve Titheradge, British actors.
- Thomas Lovejoy Harris (December 23, 1926 - January 22, 2013) married Yasuko Furuyama (m. 1969 - 2003, her death) and Geraldine (Gerre) Samuels Bracey (m. 2003 - 2013, his death). Tom was special assistant to Leonard Feather; president of the American Committee for K.E.E.P.; president of The Louise Bogan Poetry Society and a founding president of The Duke Ellington Society.

Harris died in 1958.
