= New York's 33rd congressional district =

Former congressional district

Coordinates: 42°55′N 78°46′W

- Obsolete district
- Created: 1830; 1875
- Eliminated: 1860; 1990
- Years active: 1833–1863; 1875–1993

New York's 33rd congressional district was a congressional district for the United States House of Representatives in New York. It was eliminated as a result of the 1990 census. It was last represented by Henry J. Nowak. Much of this area became part of 30th district during the 1990s, and is now largely in the 27th district.

== Components ==
1983–1993:

Parts of Erie

1973–1983:

All of Cayuga, Schuyler, Seneca, Yates
Parts of Onondaga, Ontario, Oswego, Steuben, Tompkins

1971–1973:

All of Broome, Chemung, Tioga
Parts of Tompkins

1963–1971:

All of Broome, Chemung, Tioga, Tompkins

1953–1963:

All of Franklin, Lewis, Jefferson, Oswego, St. Lawrence

1945–1953:

All of Clinton, Essex, Saratoga, Warren, Washington
Parts of Rensselaer

1913–1945:

All of Herkimer, Oneida

1903–1913:

All of Seneca, Schuyler, Chemung and Steuben County, New York.

From 1893–1903 the 33rd district covered all of Erie County except the heavily settled southern portion of the city of Buffalo, New York. Even though about two-thirds of Buffalo's area was in the 33rd District, the 32nd district which had the southern third or so of Buffalo and none of the rest of Erie county had about 6000 more people than the 33rd district.

From 1885–1893 all of Niagara County and all of Erie county except Buffalo had been in the 33rd district. During this time Buffalo was the 32nd district which had 37,000 more people than the 33rd district.

From its formation in 1875 until 1885 the 33rd district had covered Chautauqua and Cattaraugus Counties.

== Past demographics ==
The population of the 33rd's 1903–1913 area was 180,810 in 1900. The population was 0.9% black at this point.

== List of members representing the district ==
Representative	Party	Years	Cong ress	Electoral history
District established March 4, 1833
Gideon Hard (Albion)	Anti-Masonic	March 4, 1833 – March 3, 1835	23rd 24th	Elected in 1832.
Gideon Hard (Albion)	Anti-Jacksonian	March 4, 1835 – March 3, 1837	23rd 24th	Re-elected in 1834. [data missing]
Charles F. Mitchell (Lockport)	Whig	March 4, 1837 – March 3, 1841	25th 26th	Elected in 1836. Re-elected in 1838. [data missing]
Alfred Babcock (Gaines)	Whig	March 4, 1841 – March 3, 1843	27th	Elected in 1840. [data missing]
Albert Smith (Batavia)	Whig	March 4, 1843 – March 3, 1847	28th 29th	Elected in 1842. Re-elected in 1844. [data missing]
Harvey Putnam (Attica)	Whig	March 4, 1847 – March 3, 1851	30th 31st	Elected in 1846. Re-elected in 1848. [data missing]
Augustus P. Hascall (Le Roy)	Whig	March 4, 1851 – March 3, 1853	32nd	Elected in 1850. [data missing]
Reuben E. Fenton (Frewsburg)	Democratic	March 4, 1853 – March 3, 1855	33rd	Elected in 1852. [data missing]
Francis S. Edwards (Fredonia)	American	March 4, 1855 – February 28, 1857	34th	Elected in 1854. Resigned.
Vacant		March 1, 1857 – March 3, 1857	34th	
Reuben E. Fenton (Frewsburg)	Republican	March 4, 1857 – March 3, 1863	35th 36th 37th	Elected in 1856. Re-elected in 1858. Re-elected in 1860. Redistricted to 31st district.
District dissolved March 3, 1863
District re-established March 4, 1875
Vacant		March 4, 1875 – December 5, 1875	44th	Representative-elect Augustus F. Allen died on January 20, 1875.
Nelson I. Norton (Hinsdale)	Republican	December 6, 1875 – March 3, 1877	44th	Elected to finish Allen's term. [data missing]
George W. Patterson (Westfield)	Republican	March 4, 1877 – March 3, 1879	45th	Elected in 1876. [data missing]
Henry Van Aernam (Franklinville)	Republican	March 4, 1879 – March 3, 1883	46th 47th	Elected in 1878. Re-elected in 1880. [data missing]
Francis B. Brewer (Westfield)	Republican	March 4, 1883 – March 3, 1885	48th	Elected in 1882. [data missing]
John B. Weber (Buffalo)	Republican	March 4, 1885 – March 3, 1889	49th 50th	Elected in 1884. Re-elected in 1886. [data missing]
John M. Wiley (East Aurora)	Democratic	March 4, 1889 – March 3, 1891	51st	Elected in 1888. [data missing]
Thomas L. Bunting (Hamburg)	Democratic	March 4, 1891 – March 3, 1893	52nd	Elected in 1890. [data missing]
Charles Daniels (Buffalo)	Republican	March 4, 1893 – March 3, 1897	53rd 54th	Elected in 1892. Re-elected in 1894. [data missing]
De Alva S. Alexander (Buffalo)	Republican	March 4, 1897 – March 3, 1903	55th 56th 57th	Elected in 1896. Re-elected in 1898. Re-elected in 1900. Redistricted to 36th district.
Charles W. Gillet (Addison)	Republican	March 4, 1903 – March 3, 1905	58th	Redistricted from 29th district and re-elected in 1902. [data missing]
J. Sloat Fassett (Elmira)	Republican	March 4, 1905 – March 3, 1911	59th 60th 61st	Re-elected in 1904. Re-elected in 1906. Re-elected in 1908. [data missing]
Edwin S. Underhill (Bath)	Democratic	March 4, 1911 – March 3, 1913	62nd	Elected in 1910. Redistricted to 37th district.
Charles A. Talcott (Utica)	Democratic	March 4, 1913 – March 3, 1915	63rd	Redistricted from 27th district and re-elected in 1912. [data missing]
Homer P. Snyder (Little Falls)	Republican	March 4, 1915 – March 3, 1925	64th 65th 66th 67th 68th	Elected in 1914. Re-elected in 1916. Re-elected in 1918. Re-elected in 1920. Re-elected in 1922. [data missing]
Frederick M. Davenport (Clinton)	Republican	March 4, 1925 – March 3, 1933	69th 70th 71st 72nd	Elected in 1924. Re-elected in 1926. Re-elected in 1928. Re-elected in 1930. [data missing]
Fred J. Sisson (Whitesboro)	Democratic	March 4, 1933 – January 3, 1937	73rd 74th	Elected in 1932. Re-elected in 1934. [data missing]
Fred J. Douglas (Utica)	Republican	January 3, 1937 – January 3, 1945	75th 76th 77th 78th	Elected in 1936. Re-elected in 1938. Re-elected in 1940. Re-elected in 1942. [data missing]
Dean P. Taylor (Troy)	Republican	January 3, 1945 – January 3, 1953	79th 80th 81st 82nd	Redistricted from 29th district and re-elected in 1944. Re-elected in 1946. Re-elected in 1948. Re-elected in 1950. Redistricted to 31st district.
Clarence E. Kilburn (Malone)	Republican	January 3, 1953 – January 3, 1963	83rd 84th 85th 86th 87th	Redistricted from 34th district and re-elected in 1952. Re-elected in 1954. Re-elected in 1956. Re-elected in 1958. Re-elected in 1960. Redistricted to 31st district.
Howard W. Robison (Owego)	Republican	January 3, 1963 – January 3, 1973	88th 89th 90th 91st 92nd	Redistricted from 37th district and re-elected in 1962. Re-elected in 1964. Re-elected in 1966. Re-elected in 1968. Re-elected in 1970. Redistricted to 27th district.
William F. Walsh (Syracuse)	Republican	January 3, 1973 – January 3, 1979	93rd 94th 95th	Elected in 1972. Re-elected in 1974. Re-elected in 1976. [data missing]
Gary A. Lee (Dryden)	Republican	January 3, 1979 – January 3, 1983	96th 97th	Elected in 1978. Re-elected in 1980. [data missing]
Henry J. Nowak (Buffalo)	Democratic	January 3, 1983 – January 3, 1993	98th 99th 100th 101st 102nd	Redistricted from 37th district and re-elected in 1982. Re-elected in 1984. Re-elected in 1986. Re-elected in 1988. Re-elected in 1990. [data missing]
District dissolved January 3, 1993

== Election results ==
The following chart shows historic election results. Bold type indicates victor. Italic type indicates incumbent.

Year	Democratic	Republican	Other
1990	**Henry J. Nowak**: 84,905	Thomas K. Kepfer: 18,181	Louis P. Corrigan, Jr. (Conservative): 6,460
1988	**Henry J. Nowak**: 139,604		
1986	**Henry J. Nowak**: 109,256	Charles A. Walker: 19,147	
1984	**Henry J. Nowak**: 155,198	David S. Lewandowski: 44,880	
1982	**Henry J. Nowak**: 126,091	Walter J. Pillich: 19,791	James F. Gallagher (Right to Life): 4,095
1980	Dolores M. Reed: 39,542	**Gary A. Lee**: 132,831	William L. Jones (Right to Life): 2,898
1978	Roy A. Bernardi: 58,286	Gary A. Lee: 82,501	Robert J. Byrne (Conservative): 4,972; Lynne Budzinski (Liberal): 1,695
1976	Charles R. Welch: 48,855	**William F. Walsh**: 125,163	William C. Elkins (Conservative): 5,980; Lillian Reiner (Liberal): 2,757
1974	Robert H. Bockman: 45,043	**William F. Walsh**: 97,380	Francis H. Aspinwall (Conservative): 4,866; Bessie C. Noble (Liberal): 1,802
1972	Clarence Kadys: 53,039	William F. Walsh: 132,139	
1970	David Bernstein: 45,373	**Howard W. Robison**: 90,196	
1968	Benjamin Nichols: 50,549	**Howard W. Robison**: 110,080	
1966	Blair G. Ewing: 45,761	**Howard W. Robison**: 88,378	Joe Griffith (Write-in): 432
1964	John L. Joy: 69,277	**Howard W. Robison**: 97,213	
1962	Theodore W. Maurer: 41,412	**Howard W. Robison**: 92,460	Harrop Freeman (Liberal): 4,519
1960	Edward J. Gosier: 53,130	**Clarence E. Kilburn**: 91,710	Winfred Harberson (Liberal): 3,334
1958	Robert P. McDonald: 40,010	**Clarence E. Kilburn**: 73,698	
1956	Louis C. Britton: 38,793	**Clarence E. Kilburn**: 103,419	
1954	Harold Blake: 31,279	**Clarence E. Kilburn**: 70,708	William J. Delo (Liberal): 1,851
1952	Maurice N. McGrath: 41,803	**Clarence E. Kilburn**: 98,653	William J. Delo (Liberal): 2,522
1950	Joseph T. Hammer: 42,680	**Dean P. Taylor**: 100,425	George LaFortune (American Labor): 1,874; John H. Sullivan (Liberal): 676
1948	Joseph T. Hammer: 52,059	**Dean P. Taylor**: 98,618	Rockwell Kent (American Labor): 4,257
1946	David J. Fitzgerald: 38,666	**Dean P. Taylor**: 89,778	
1944	Thomas P. McLoughlin: 52,354	**Dean P. Taylor**: 95,299	Henry G. Bell (American Labor): 4,530
1942	Stanard Dow Butler: 34,965	**Fred J. Douglas**: 53,030	
1940	Samuel H. Miller: 52,469	**Fred J. Douglas**: 72,412	Edward G. Cluney (American Labor): 3,405
1938	Ralph A. Peters: 37,195	**Fred J. Douglas**: 63,857	Stanley C. Walewski (American Labor): 2,882; Albert R. Tully (Socialist): 344
1936	Fred J. Sisson: 45,969	Fred J. Douglas: 63,281	William D. Arquint (Prosperity): 8,479; Peter Hansen (Socialist): 1,428
1934	**Fred J. Sisson**: 45,831	Frederick M. Davenport: 45,579	Anthony Spadafora (Socialist): 1,682; Fred C. Foster (Law Preservation): 205
1932	Fred J. Sisson: 53,427	Frederick M. Davenport: 52,398	Otto L. Endres (Socialist): 1,119
1930	James J. Loftis: 39,340	**Frederick M. Davenport**: 39,810	
1928	Fred J. Sisson: 48,380	**Frederick M. Davenport**: 62,746	
1926	Isaac C. Flint: 30,265	**Frederick M. Davenport**: 40,845	Otto L. Endres (Socialist): 1,572
1924	Albert R. Kessinger: 33,068	Frederick M. Davenport: 48,591	Otto L. Endres (Socialist): 1,979
1922	Fred J. Sisson: 30,118	**Homer P. Snyder**: 31,978	Charles L. Letson (Socialist): 1,431; William Harrison (Prohibition): 987
1920	Roger W. Huntington: 21,732	**Homer P. Snyder**: 47,251	Harvey P. Brucker (Socialist): 2,887; Olin S. Bishop (Prohibition): 1,320
