= Native American citizenship after 1924 =

Native Americans have populated North America for tens of thousands of years, but they were not initially granted citizenship when the United States was first established. Native American tribes were legally recognized as sovereign nations, as established by court cases such as Cherokee Nation v. Georgia (1831) and Worcester v. Georgia (1832). The designation of sovereign nation allowed tribes to govern themselves and enter treaties. However, it also meant that Native Americans were denied U.S. citizenship and the privileges that go along with it, such as voting rights and federal protections.

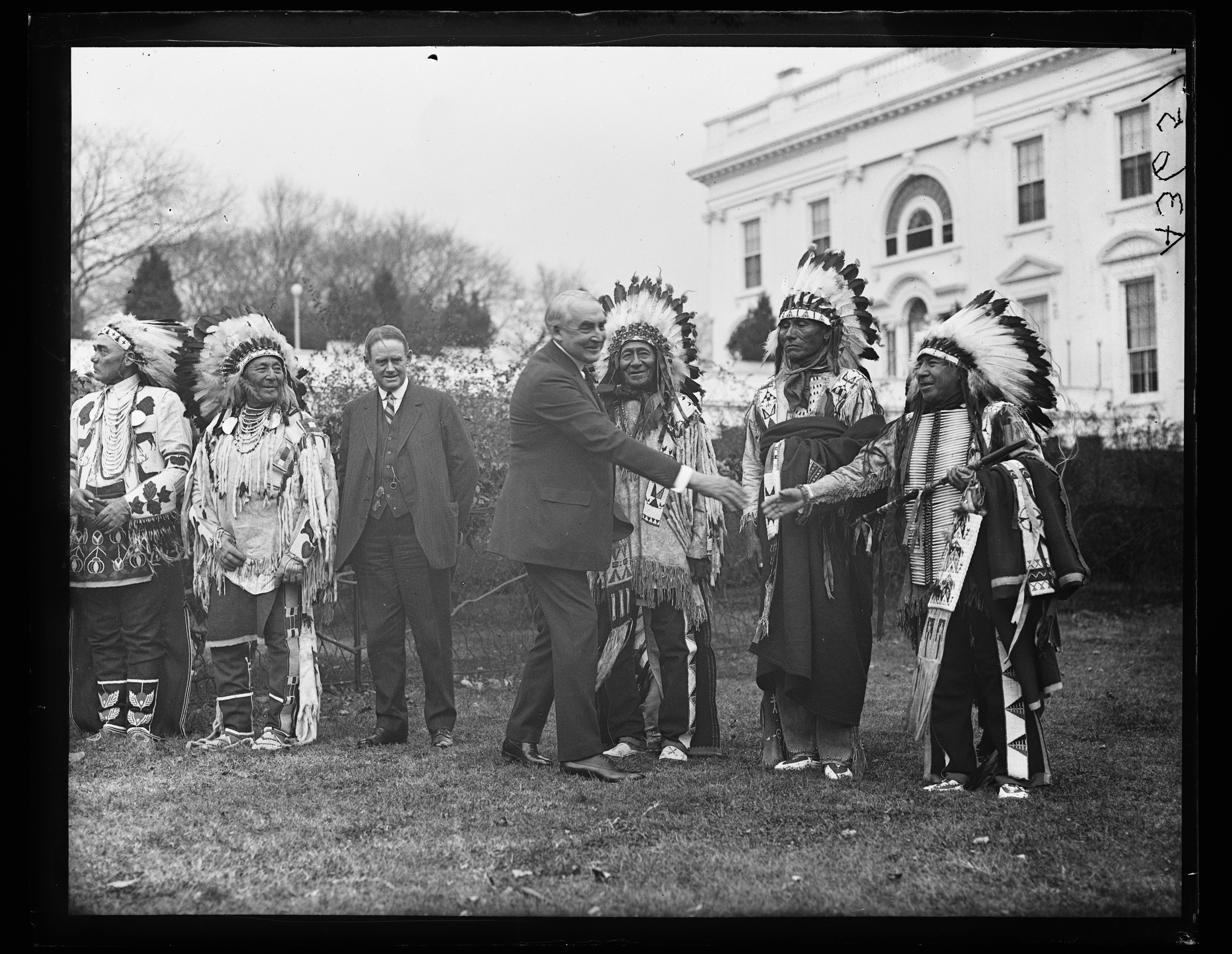
President Warren Harding meeting with Native Americans at the White House a few years before the Indian Citizenship Act was passed.

Change in this policy of sovereign statehood came after World War I, when Native American veterans started pushing for more federal recognition. The government began to grant citizenship to these veterans, and within a few years congress passed the Indian Citizenship Act, granting citizenship to all U.S.-born Native Americans. This act established dual citizenship, allowing Native Americans to be citizens of both the U.S. and their tribe.

== Historical background ==
Due to the lack of early written records, it is difficult to know exactly how long Native American populations have lived on the American Continent, but archeologists have found evidence that suggests they have populated the continent for tens of thousands of years. Native Americans lived as members of distinct, independent nations, in communities ranging in size from small bands to immense cities, speaking hundreds of different languages. Two prominent Indigenous cities were Cahokia, in what is now Illinois, and Humugham, located in modern-day Arizona; both reached their peaks in the early 1000s. Larger language groups often broke off into smaller tribal bands, such as the Innu, Abenaki, and Algonquin, all part of the Northeastern Algonquian language group.

In the early 1500s, European colonists began to arrive on the North American continent and create settlements. Most colonists expressed little interest in integrating into Native American society and created separate settlements on Indigenous lands, buying the land in some instances, or simply claiming it and taking it by force in others. In the following centuries, the European population grew as did conflicts between Native peoples and European settlers. Wars such as the Pequot War and King Phillip's War pitted European colonial powers against Native American tribes; thousands of Indigenous and European settlers were killed in these campaigns.

The English colonists became the most numerous colonial group on the North American East Coast and declared independence from England in order to form their own nation. In the American Revolution which ensued, some Native American tribes supported the rebelling colonists, while others supported the British. In the end, the colonists gained independence and began to form the United States of America. While this new nation granted citizenship to Euro-American settlers, it excluded Native Americans, even those who helped in the war.

After the American Revolution, a group of statesmen came together to create a constitution for the newly formed United States of America. The new constitution gave no explicit definition of citizenship, but it implied that Native Americans were not U.S. citizens. In Article 1, Section 2, it stated that all "free persons," meaning full U.S. citizens, would be taxed, but Native Americans would be exempt. In Article 1, Section 8, the section discussing trade relations, the constitution refers to Native American tribes as different entities than the United States of America or foreign nations.

In the 1830s, the issue of Native American citizenship was addressed in court cases Cherokee Nation v. Georgia (1831) and Worcester v. Georgia (1832). These cases established that Native American tribes are sovereign nations and that Native Americans are citizens of their individual tribes, not of the United States. This policy was continued by the Fourteenth Amendment, ratified in 1868. The Fourteenth Amendment grants U.S. citizenship to all people born in the U.S., but it did not include Native Americans.

The Dawes Act, passed in 1887, granted citizenship to Native Americans who accepted individual land allotments. To accept citizenship, Natives were required to renounce all tribal lands and tribal rights; they had to give up tribal identity completely. Between 1887 and World War I, about 90,000 Native Americans received citizenship through this act. But the real push for citizenship started after World War I and was enacted in 1924 with the Indian Citizenship Act.

== Indian Citizenship Act of 1924 ==
The Indian Citizenship Act of 1924, also known as the Snyder Act, was signed into law by President Calvin Coolidge on June 2, 1924. This act allowed all non-citizen Natives who were born within the United States territory to be granted citizenship. At the same time, this act clarified that U.S. citizenship would not alter or impair tribal citizenship or property rights. Citizenship was extended to Indigenous individuals who had not already obtained it through allotment, marriage, or military service. There are estimates that suggest that about 125,000 Indigenous people obtained citizenship through the Act.

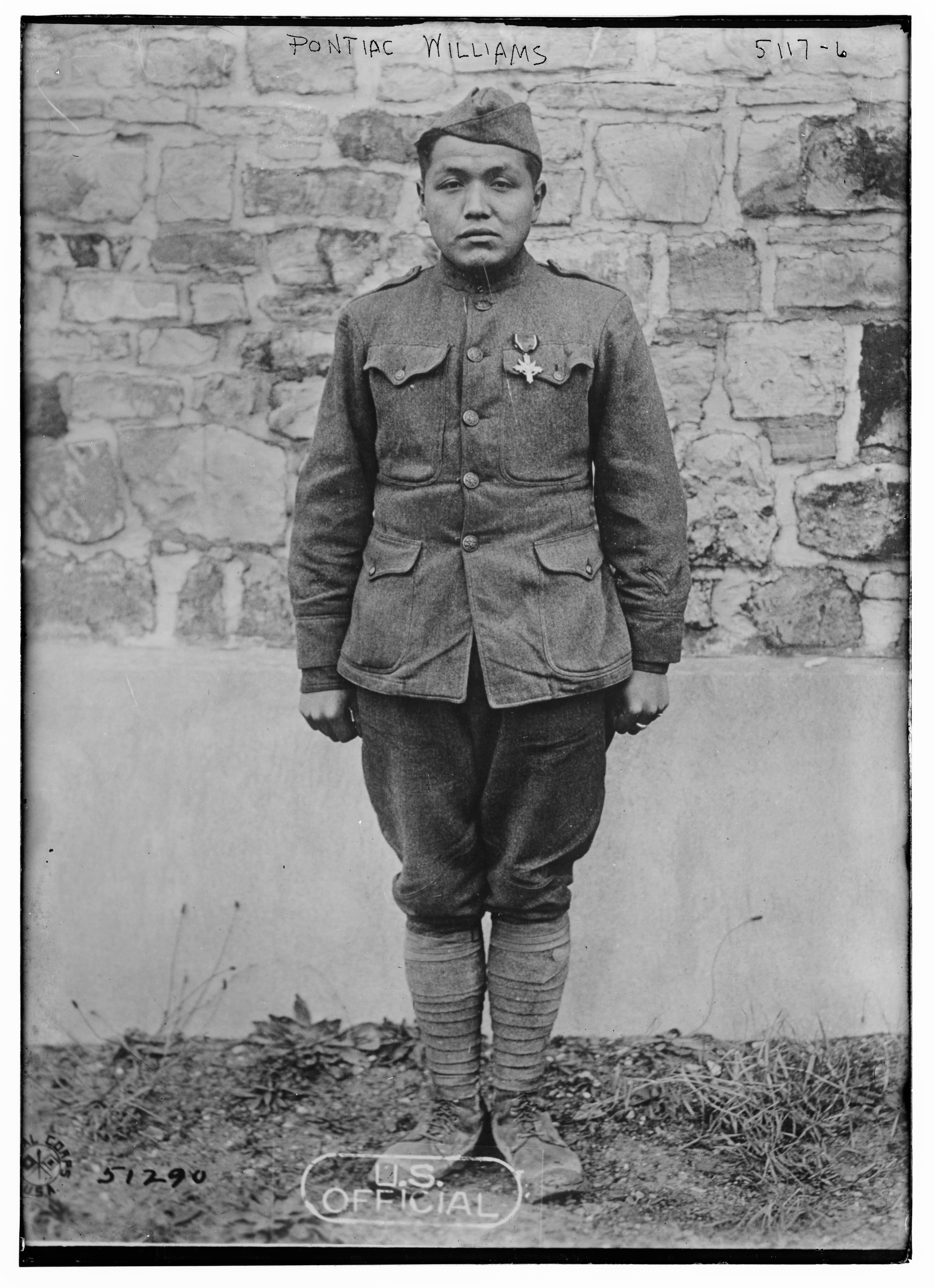
Pontiac Williams, a Native American World War I veteran

There were several factors that motivated congressional leaders to extend citizenship to all Native Americans. One of these factors was the significant influence of Native military participation during World War I. Native Americans served in the war at a higher per-capita rate than any other ethnic group, as many expected that their service would grant them citizenship. After the war, Native veterans advocated for broad federal recognition, and many Congressional members began to view the continued exclusion of Indigenous servicemembers from citizenship as being unjust. This was all part of a broader national movement toward Americanization and defining national belonging. Some scholars note that the act reflected contemporary efforts to standardize political membership.

Even though the Indian Citizenship Act extended American citizenship, it did not end the federal government’s trust responsibilities or tribal sovereignty. Courts continued to treat tribes as distinct political communities, and Native Americans stayed citizens of both the United States and their tribal nations.

== Native reaction to Indian Citizenship Act ==
Native Americans reacted to the Indian Citizenship Act of 1924 in a variety of ways. Their responses shows their differing views on whether U.S. citizenship would enhance or diminish Indigenous political, cultural, and legal autonomy.

=== Positive responses ===
Several Native reformers in the early twentieth century saw citizenship as a way to solve the ambiguous legal status given to them by federal leaders. Members of the Society of American Indians (SAI) declared that the lack of defined political status was a barrier to Native legal and civic participation, but that citizenship was the solution. SAI leaders debated the relationship between American citizenship and tribal citizenship but ultimately argued that Indigenous people could participate fully in modern American life while still retaining their distinct cultural identities and rights.

Native participation in World War I also shaped positive responses. More than ten thousand Native Americans enlisted in the U.S. Army, the majority as volunteers. Many reformers described this as evidence that Native people both wanted and deserved the full rights of citizenship. Many Natives used their citizenship status after 1924 to pursue voting rights, even in states that continued to withhold those rights. In the Southwest, Native litigants brought test cases to challenge state-level restrictions, and they argued that American citizenship entitled them to the same electoral participation as other citizens.

=== Negative responses ===
Other Native Americans rejected the Act or expressed serious reservations about its implications. Some saw U.S. citizenship as a part of assimilation that could ruin their culture or impose unwanted political obligations. Critics argued that citizenship risked destroying traditional social structures by replacing tribal authority with state or federal authority. Writers such as Luther Standing Bear said that the Act failed to deliver meaningful protections to Native culture, and that it primarily served federal interests rather than Native communities.

The Pueblo and Haudenosaunee (Iroquois Confederacy) nations were among some who explicitly opposed automatic U.S. citizenship. Many Pueblo leaders emphasized that citizenship should only be given with tribal consent. They also expressed the fear that automatic citizenship risked subjecting Pueblo communities to unfamiliar state laws. Similarly, the Haudenosaunee asserted that their members were citizens of their own nations, and that a conferral of U.S. citizenship would violate treaty relationships. Leaders such as Tuscarora Chief Clinton Rickard argued that the Act infringed upon Indigenous nationhood.

Many current legal scholars and Native intellectuals argue that granting citizenship without Native consent conflicted with fundamental principles of naturalization and self-determination. In addition, federal guardianship continued after 1924, which produced a situation where natives were citizens in name but still not fully equal politically. These scholars link the Indian Naturalization Act as a way to assimilate Natives, thereby eroding Indigenous self-governance.

== Effects of citizenship after 1924 ==
=== Voting rights ===
The right to vote comes with being a citizen of the United States of America. But when Native Americans were made citizens in 1924, they were not guaranteed this right. Incumbent politicians and white citizens were worried that the Native vote would turn political tides and so they found systematic ways to disenfranchise Native Americans. The fifteenth amendment, ratified in 1870, prohibited the denial of voting rights on the basis of race or color, but state governments found other ways to limit Native American voting.

One method used by several states to disenfranchise Native Americans was the denial of state citizenship. Even after the Indian Citizenship Act was passed, granting Native Americans national citizenship, some states required Native Americans to prove that they had cut ties with their tribe and were assimilated into Euro-American culture before they could gain state citizenship. If a Native wasn’t considered a citizen of a certain state, they were not allowed to vote in elections held in that state. States similarly used residency as a way to stop Native Americans from voting, claiming that Native Americans residing on reservations were not residents of the state the reservation was located in.

Another method widely practiced was the inclusion of the phrase “Indians not taxed” in state constitutions. Idaho, Maine, Mississippi, New Mexico, and Washington included this line in their constitutions and made laws that denied voting privileges to "Indians not taxed" because they weren't economic contributors to the state.

A third method commonly used to prevent Native Americans from voting was to claim that Native Americans were under federal guardianship. In many state constitutions, the right to vote was denied to the insane or the incompetent, and other states added “under guardianship” to this list. States with this restriction considered Native Americans tribes to be wards of the federal government, therefore, all Native Americans were under federal guardianship.

Some states disenfranchised Native voters by using techniques leveled at preventing other minority groups from voting. Just as literacy tests were used to prevent African Americans from voting, this technique was adopted in some states to prevent Natives from voting. In the 1920s, when the Indian Citizenship Act was passed, there were many Native Americans that only spoke their native tongue. Others spoke English but did not write it. Native Americans who could not complete an English literacy test were unable to participate in elections in some states.

The purpose of the fifteenth amendment was to prevent these practices of racial voting discrimination; section 3 gave instructions on how to address situations in which systems were put in place to prevent certain racial groups from voting, but these provisions were applied on a case-to-case basis and didn't allow for broad, systematic change. The Voting Rights Act of 1965 was the first nationwide action the government took against discriminatory voting policies. This act made it unlawful for states to prevent anyone from a racial or language minority from registering and voting. In 1970, the act was amended to ban literacy tests and other devices that resulted in the exclusion of minorities in the voting process. In 1975, a provision was added to the act that required language assistance to anyone who did not speak English. Native Americans were able to receive oral assistance in their own tribal languages while registering and voting.

Although Native Americans were granted a path to citizenship in 1924, some of the rights that were supposed to accompany citizenship were not granted fully until much later. For some native Americans, it was not until the Voting Rights Act of 1965 that voting became a guaranteed right.

=== Taxation of native individuals and reservation lands ===
Federal Indian law stated that the extension of American citizenship did not give states the right to impose taxes on reservation lands or on the income of tribal members residing on their reservations. Historically, to Natives and Americans alike, Native people were seen as members of their own political communities, and because of this, tribal members were excluded from state tax systems unless they had severed tribal relations. That same principle continued into the twentieth century after the Indian Citizenship Act was enacted. Public Law 280, which was enacted in 1953, explicitly prohibited states from taxing any personal property of Natives or their tribes. The Supreme Court reaffirmed these limitations in McClanahan v Arizona Tax Commission (1973), in which they determined that states could not tax any income earned by tribal members residing on reservation lands without congressional approval.

=== Tribal, state, and federal jurisdiction after citizenship ===
Gaining U.S. citizenship did not give states automatic authority over Native Americans or reservation lands. Many court rulings after 1924 determined that states did not have jurisdiction over tribal members in most civil, criminal, or regulatory matters unless Congress explicitly authorized state involvement. The Supreme Court continued to uphold the idea that tribal nations had a right to sovereignty over their internal affairs, of which states should not interfere with. The Williams v. Lee (1959) case was one that furthered this idea, in which the court stated that states could not take any action that would prevent Natives who lived on reservations to make their own laws. State attempts to regulate reservation activities were also blocked under federal preemption, which prevented states from exercising authority in areas where federal policy occupied the field. Together, these rulings and principles upheld the idea that the Indian Citizenship Act changed political membership, but not the distribution of authority between tribal nations, states, and the federal government.

=== Dual citizenship in practice ===
The Indian Citizenship Act created a unique system of duality in which Native Americans became citizens of both the United States and their tribal nations. Unlike other naturalization processes, U.S. citizenship in 1924 was given automatically and without individual application or tribal consent, which later raised questions about the nature of political membership. Despite this extension of federal citizenship, tribal citizenship stayed separate and continued to be a source of political identity for Indigenous tribal members.

This dual status meant that Native Americans gained certain rights as U.S. citizens, such as federal citizenship statues, military eligibility, and eventual access to voting rights, while also keeping their rights, responsibilities, and political identity within their tribal communities. Tribal citizenship continued to govern issues such as land tenure, participation in tribal government, and community membership.

Still, many Indigenous leaders expressed concern that automatic dual citizenship risked ruining tribal self determination. Others, especially reformers in organizations like the Society of American Indians, saw dual citizenship as a way to experience both spheres of political life. This dual citizenship framework remains today and is a central feature of the political and legal statues of Native Americans in the United States.
