= Gary A. Lee =

American politician (1933–2022)

Gary Alcide Lee
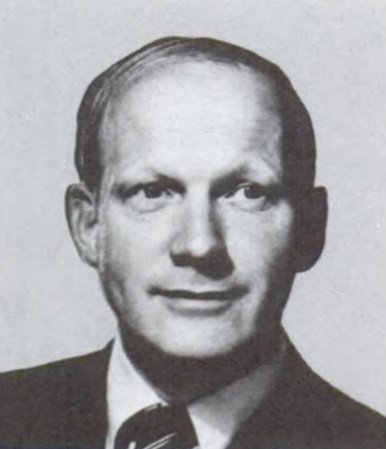

Member of the U.S. House of Representatives from New York's 33rd district
- In office January 3, 1979 – January 3, 1983
- Preceded by: William F. Walsh
- Succeeded by: Henry J. Nowak

Member of the New York State Assembly from the 128th district
- In office January 1, 1975 – January 31, 1978
- Preceded by: Constance E. Cook
- Succeeded by: Hugh S. MacNeil

Personal details
- Born: August 18, 1933 Buffalo, New York, U.S.
- Died: October 12, 2022 (aged 89) Fort Myers, Florida, U.S.
- Party: Republican
- Spouse(s): Kathleen Ann O'Brian (m. 1958); Maureen Elizabeth Peterson (m. 2006)
- Children: 4
- Education: Colgate University (BA)

Military service
- Allegiance: United States
- Branch/service: United States Navy
- Years of service: 1952–1956
- Rank: Petty Officer Second Class

Gary Alcide Lee (August 18, 1933 – October 12, 2022) was an American politician from New York. A Republican, he was noted for his service as a member of the New York State Assembly (1975–1978) and the United States House of Representatives (1979–1983).

== Early life ==
Lee was born in Buffalo, New York, the son of Harold D. Lee and Margaret (Brewer) Lee. He graduated from Northside High School in Corning, New York in 1951 and served in the United States Navy from 1952 until 1956, attaining the rank of petty officer second class. He later served in the United States Naval Reserve, in which he attained the rank of lieutenant (junior grade). Lee graduated from Colgate University in 1960 and later did graduate studies at Colgate and at Cornell University. After college he worked as an educational administrator and consultant, including director of Cornell's financial aid, student loan and scholarship programs.

== Political career ==
A Republican, Lee served as a member of the Corning, New York city council in 1962. From 1963 to 1967 he was a member of the town board in Dryden, New York, and he served as Dryden's town supervisor from 1967 to 1969. From 1968 to 1974, Lee served in the Tompkins County Legislature. From 1975 to 1978, Lee was a member of the New York State Assembly, sitting in the 181st and 182nd New York State Legislatures.

Lee was elected to Congress in 1978 and represented New York's 33rd congressional district from January 3, 1979 until January 3, 1983. He was an unsuccessful candidate for re-nomination in 1982, when re-districting created a primary contest with George Wortley in the 27th district, which Wortley won.

== Later life ==
After leaving Congress, Lee resided in Alexandria, Virginia, and was vice president of IC Industries. He later relocated to Fort Myers, Florida, where he remained active in politics, including serving as chair of the Lee County Republican Party for ten years. Lee died in Fort Myers, Florida, on October 12, 2022, at the age of 89. He was cremated, with arrangements handled by the Neptune Society.

== See also ==
New York State Assembly
Preceded by Constance E. Cook	Member of the New York State Assembly from the 128th district 1975–1978	Succeeded by Hugh S. MacNeil
U.S. House of Representatives
Preceded by William F. Walsh	Member of the U.S. House of Representatives from New York's 33rd congressional district 1979–1983	Succeeded by Henry J. Nowak
