= Clarence E. Kilburn =

American politician

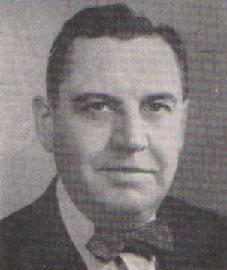

Member of the U.S. House of Representatives from New York's 31st district
- In office February 13, 1940 – January 3, 1965
- Preceded by: Wallace E. Pierce
- Succeeded by: Robert C. McEwen

Personal details
- Born: April 13, 1893 Malone, New York, US
- Died: May 20, 1975 (aged 82) Malone, New York, US
- Party: Republican
- Education: Cornell University

Clarence Evans Kilburn (April 13, 1893 – May 20, 1975) was a Republican member of the United States House of Representatives from New York.

Kilburn was born in Malone, New York. He graduated from Cornell University in 1916. He enlisted for World War I, completed officer training at Madison Barracks, New York, and received his commission as a second lieutenant of Infantry. Kilburn served in France with the 26th Infantry Regiment, 1st Infantry Division, and later returned to the United States as an instructor in the use of trench mortars. He was discharged at Camp Gordon, Georgia as a captain in 1919.

After the war Kilburn worked for a Malone ice cream and candy wholesaler before beginning a career in banking. In 1930 he was appointed president of the People's Trust Co. of Malone. He was also a member of the board of directors of the Marine Midland Trust Company of Northern New York.

He was elected to Congress in 1940 to fill the vacancy caused by the death of Wallace E. Pierce and served from February 13, 1940, until January 3, 1965.

During his years in Congress, Kilburn was one of the more conservative members of the New York Republican delegation, but was liberal on the issue of foreign aid, like most members of the New York delegation. Kilburn voted against the Civil Rights Acts of 1957 and Civil Rights Act of 1964 (and was the sole member of the New York Congressional delegation to vote against the latter bill), while he did not vote on the Civil Rights Act of 1960 or the 24th Amendment to the U.S. Constitution.

He died in Malone, New York, and was buried at Morningside Cemetery.

His father was New York State Senator Frederick D. Kilburn.

== Sources ==
- United States Congress. "Clarence E. Kilburn (id: K000170)". Biographical Directory of the United States Congress.

U.S. House of Representatives
Preceded by Wallace E. Pierce	Member of the U.S. House of Representatives from New York's 31st congressional district 1940–1945	Succeeded by Bernard W. Kearney
Preceded by Edwin Arthur Hall	Member of the U.S. House of Representatives from New York's 34th congressional district 1945–1953	Succeeded by William R. Williams
Preceded by Dean P. Taylor	Member of the U.S. House of Representatives from New York's 33rd congressional district 1953–1963	Succeeded by Howard W. Robison
Preceded by Carleton J. King	Member of the U.S. House of Representatives from New York's 31st congressional district 1963–1965	Succeeded by Robert C. McEwen
Preceded by Henry O. Talle	Ranking Member of the House Banking and Currency Committee; 1959–1965	Succeeded by William B. Widnall
