= Indian Citizenship Act =

1924 US federal law granting citizenship to Native Americans

Native Indian Citizenship Act
- Other short titles: Native Indian Freedom Citizenship Suffrage Act of 1924 and 1925
- Long title: An Act to authorize the Secretary of the Interior to issue certificates of citizenship to Native Indians.
- Acronyms (colloquial): ICA
- Nicknames: Snyder Act
- Enacted by: the 68th United States Congress
- Effective: June 2, 1924

Citations
- Public law: Pub. L. 68–175
- Statutes at Large: 43 Stat. 253

Codification
- Titles amended: 8 U.S.C.: Aliens and Nationality
- U.S.C. sections amended: 8 U.S.C. ch. 12, subch. III § 1401b

Legislative history
- Introduced in the House as H.R. 6355 by Homer P. Snyder (R-NY) on February 22, 1924; Committee consideration by House Indian Affairs, Senate Indian Affairs; Passed the House on March 18, 1924 (Passed); Passed the Senate on May 15, 1924 (Agreed); Agreed to by the House on May 23, 1924 (Agreed) and by the Senate on; Signed into law by President Calvin Coolidge on June 2, 1924

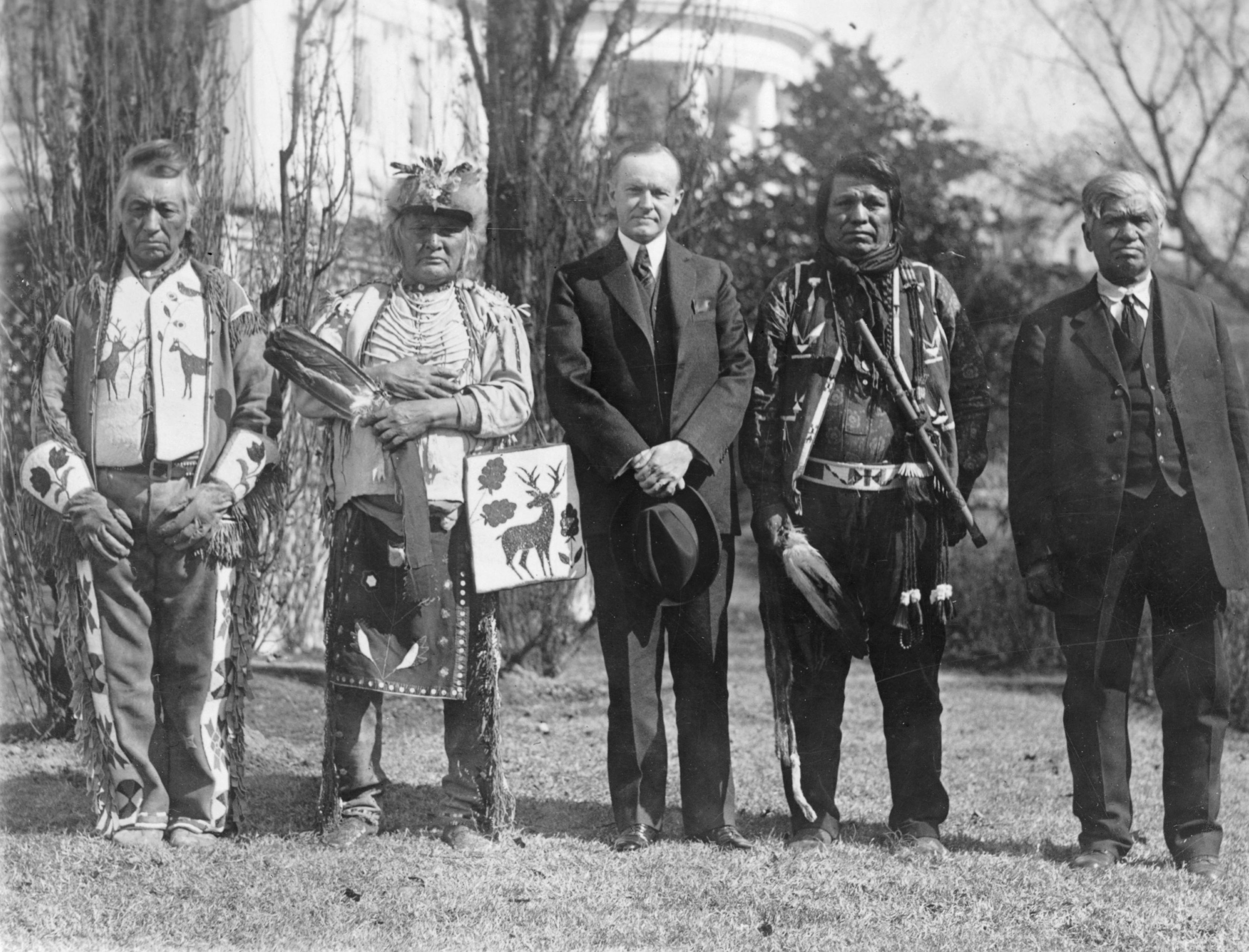
President Coolidge stands with four Osage Indians at a White House ceremony

The Indian Citizenship Act of 1924 (43 Stat. 253, enacted June 2, 1924) was an act of the United States Congress that declared Native Americans born within the United States are US citizens. Although the Fourteenth Amendment to the U.S. Constitution provides that any person born in the United States is a citizen, there is an exception for persons not "subject to the jurisdiction" of the federal government. This language was generally taken to mean members of various tribes that were treated as separate sovereignties: they were citizens of their tribal nations.

The act was proposed by U.S. Representative Homer P. Snyder (R-N.Y.), and signed into law by President Calvin Coolidge on June 2, 1924. It was enacted partially in recognition of the thousands of Native Americans who served in the U.S. Armed Forces during World War I.

== Text ==
The text of the 1924 Indian Citizenship Act reads as follows:

Be it enacted by the Senate and House of Representatives of the United States of America in Congress assembled, That all non citizen Indians born within the territorial limits of the United States be, and they are hereby, declared to be citizens of the United States: Provided That the granting of such citizenship shall not in any manner impair or otherwise affect the right of any Indian to tribal or other property.

Approved, June 2, 1924. June 2, 1924. [H. R. 6355.] [Public, No. 175.]

SIXTY-EIGHTH CONGRESS. Sess. I. CHS. 233. 1924.

See House Report No. 222, Certificates of Citizenship to Indians, 68th Congress, 1st Session, Feb. 22, 1924.

The act has been codified in the United States Code at Title 8, Sec. 1401(b).

== History and background ==
=== US Constitution ===
At the time of the adoption of the US Constitution under Article One, Native Americans, who were classified as "Indians not taxed", were not considered to be eligible for US citizenship because they were governed by distinct tribes, which functioned in a political capacity. Native persons who were members of a tribe were specifically excluded from representation and taxation. The case of Cherokee Nation v. Georgia (1831), according to historian Brad Tennant, established that tribal members "who maintained their tribal ties and resided on tribal land would technically be considered foreigners" living in the United States as wards of the federal government.

The earliest recorded date of Native people becoming US citizens was in 1831, when the Mississippi Choctaw became citizens after the Treaty of Dancing Rabbit Creek of 1830 was ratified. Under Article XIV of that treaty, any Choctaw who elected not to move to Native American territory could become an American citizen when he registered, and if he stayed on designated lands for five years after treaty ratification.

In the Dred Scott v. Sandford (1857) decision, Chief Justice of the Supreme Court Roger B. Taney stated that even if a Native American gave up his tribal membership and paid taxes, the only path to citizenship was through naturalization, legislation, or provisions of a treaty:

They [the Indian tribes] may without doubt, like the subjects of any foreign government, be naturalized by the authority of Congress and become citizens of a state and of the United States, and if an individual should leave his nation or tribe, and take up his abode among the white population, he would be entitled to all the rights and privileges which would belong to an emigrant from any other foreign people.

After the American Civil War, the Civil Rights Act of 1866 (ratified in 1870, after the Fourteenth Amendment came into effect) repeated the exclusion, declaring:

all persons born in the United States, and not subject to any foreign power, excluding Indians not taxed, are hereby declared to be citizens of the United States.

=== Fourteenth Amendment, legal decisions and legislation ===
In 1868, the Fourteenth Amendment declared all persons "born or naturalized in the United States, and subject to the jurisdiction thereof" were citizens. However, the "jurisdiction" requirement was interpreted to exclude most Native Americans, and in 1870, the Senate Judiciary Committee further clarified the matter: "the 14th amendment to the Constitution has no effect whatever upon the status of the Indian tribes within the limits of the United States". About 8% of the Native population at the time qualified for US citizenship because they were "taxed". Others obtained citizenship by serving in the military, marrying whites, or accepting land allotments such as those granted under the Dawes Act.

The exclusion of Native Americans from US citizenship was further established by Elk v. Wilkins (1884), when the Supreme Court held that a Native person born a citizen of a recognized tribal nation was not born an American citizen and did not become one simply by voluntarily leaving his tribe and settling among whites. The syllabus of the decision explained that a Native person "who has not been naturalized, or taxed, or recognized as a citizen either by the United States or by the state, is not a citizen of the United States within the meaning of the first section of the Fourteenth Article of Amendment of the Constitution".

Although the Dawes Act did not apply to citizens of the Five Civilized Tribes, the Osage, Miami, the Peoria, nor the Sac and Fox Nations of Indian Territory, the Curtis Act of 1898 extended its provisions to their citizens, requiring allotment of their lands and making their tribal members eligible to vote in local elections. In 1886, Congress passed a new law, Aug. 9, 1888, ch. 818, §2, 25 Stat. 392, that made Indian woman US citizens if they married a white man. Codified at 25 U.S.C. §182. A federal act (31 Stat. 1447) of March 3, 1901, granted United States citizenship to all Native people residing in Indian Territory. Subsequent passage of the Burke Act of 1906, withheld US citizenship granted by the Dawes Act until the trust period for an allotment expired (typically 25 years) or the allottee obtained a fee patent from the government administrator. The Burke Act did "not extend to any Indians in the Indian Territory". After World War I ended, Congress decreed in 1919, that all Native people who had been honorably discharged after serving in the war could become US citizens, if they applied for it.

=== Indian Citizenship Act ===
The Indian Citizenship Act of 1924 declared:

all non citizen Indians born within the territorial limits of the United States be, and they are hereby, declared to be citizens of the United States.

This grant of citizenship applied to about 125,000 of the 300,000 Indigenous people in the United States, the total population of which was between 106 million and 123 million at that time. The Indigenous people not included had already become citizens by other means, such as by entering the armed forces, giving up tribal affiliations, and assimilating into mainstream American life. Citizenship was granted in a piecemeal fashion before the Act, which was the first more inclusive method of granting Native American citizenship.

Even Native Americans who were granted citizenship rights under the 1924 Act may not have had full citizenship and suffrage rights until 1948 because the right to vote was governed by state law. According to a survey by the Department of Interior, seven states still refused to grant Indians voting rights in 1938. Discrepancies between federal and state control provided loopholes in the Act's enforcement. States justified discrimination based on state statutes and constitutions. Three main arguments for Indian voting exclusion were Indian exemption from real estate taxes, maintenance of tribal affiliation, and the notion that Indians were under guardianship or lived on lands controlled by federal trusteeship. By 1947, all states with large Indian populations, except Arizona and New Mexico, had extended voting rights to Native Americans who qualified under the 1924 Act. Finally, in 1948, the states withdrew their prohibition on Indian voting because of a judicial decision.

Under the 1924 Act, Indigenous people did not have to apply for citizenship, nor did they have to give up their tribal citizenship to become US citizens. Most tribes had communal property, and to have a right to the land, individual Indian people needed to belong to the tribe. Thus, dual citizenship was allowed. Earlier views on granting Indian citizenship had suggested allocating land to individuals. Of such efforts, the Dawes Act was the most prominent. That Act allocated once-tribally-owned land to individual tribal members, and because they were landowners and eventually would pay taxes on the land and become "proficient members of society", they could be granted citizenship. This idea was presented by a group of white American citizens, called "Friends of the Indian", who lobbied for the assimilation of Indigenous people into American society. They specifically hoped to do that by elevating Indigenous people to the status of US citizens. Though the Dawes Act allocated land, the notion that this should be directly tied to citizenship was abandoned in the early 20th century in favor of a more direct path to American citizenship.

== Debate ==
Although some white citizen groups were supportive of Indian citizenship, Native Americans themselves were divided on the debate. Those who supported it considered the Act a way to secure a long-standing political identity. Those who rejected it were concerned about tribal sovereignty and citizenship. Many leaders in the Native American community at the time, like Doctor Charles Eastman, a Flandreau Santee Sioux, were interested in Native American integration into the larger society but adamant about preserving the Native American identity. Many were also reluctant to trust the government that had taken their land and violently discriminated against them.

One group who opposed the bill was the Onondaga Nation. They believed acceptance of this act was "treason" because the United States Senate was forcing citizenship on all Indians without their consent. According to the Iroquois, the bill disregarded previous treaties between the Indian Tribes and the United States, specifically the 1784 Treaty of Fort Stanwix, the 1789 Treaty of Fort Harmor, and the 1794 Treaty of Canandaigua in which the Iroquois were recognized as "separate and sovereign". The removal of the word "full" from "full citizenship" in the text of the original bill was used as a reason why some Native Americans were not granted the immediate right to vote with the bill.

On May 19, 1924, Snyder said on the House floor, "The New York Indians are very much opposed to this, but I am perfectly willing to take the responsibility if the committee sees fit to agree to this." After passage of the Bill, Snyder became the representative of some of these Indians.

On December 30, 1924, the Chiefs of the Onondaga sent a letter to President Calvin Coolidge:

Therefore, be it resolved, that we, the Indians of the Onondaga Tribe of the Six Nations, duly depose and sternly protest the principal and object of the aforesaid Snyder Bill, … Wherefore, we the undersigned counselling (sic) Chiefs of the Onondaga Nation, recommend the abandonment and repeal of the Snyder Bill.

With little lobbying effort from Native Americans themselves, two primarily white groups shaped the law: Progressive senators and activists, like the "Friends of the Indians." Progressive senators on the Senate Indian Affairs Committee were for the Act because they thought it would reduce corruption and inefficiency in the Department of Interior and the Bureau of Indian Affairs. Such institutions would no longer be in control of citizenship regulations if citizenship were automatically granted to all Indigenous people. They also hoped to empower Indians through citizenship.

Other groups for Native American citizenship supported it because of the "guardianship" status they felt the US government should take to protect Indigenous people. They worried Indians were being taken advantage of by non-Indigenous Americans for their land. They advocated that the government had an obligation to supervise and protect Native citizens. The Indian Rights Association, a key group in the development of this legislation, advocated that federal guardianship was a necessary component of citizenship. They pushed for the clause "tribal rights and property" in the Indian Citizenship Act to preserve Indian identity but gain citizenship rights and protection.

One advocate for American Indians during the early 20th century, Joseph K. Dixon, who had previously advocated for segregated Indian units during World War I in an effort to prevent their assimilation, wrote (referring to soldiers who served in World War I):

The Indian, though a man without a country, the Indian who has suffered a thousand wrongs considered the white man's burden and from mountains, plains and divides, the Indian threw himself into the struggle to help throttle the unthinkable tyranny of the Hun. The Indian helped to free Belgium, helped to free all the small nations, helped to give victory to the Stars and Stripes. The Indian went to France to help avenge the ravages of autocracy. Now, shall we not redeem ourselves by redeeming all the tribes?

Nipo T. Strongheart, a performer-lecturer on Native American topics at Lyceum and Chautauqua and similar activities across the United States from 1917 through the 1920s, gathered signatures on petitions supporting Indian enfranchisement into the tens of thousands. Some of his trips into Pennsylvania were in support of Melville Clyde Kelly, a supporter of the bill in Congress, who had a district there. The petitions and other advocacy work helped pass the bill, but he was ultimately disillusioned with the results.

== See also ==
- Native Americans in the United States
- Native American civil rights
- Cultural assimilation of Native Americans
- Article One of the United States Constitution
- Native American Citizenship After 1924
