= Fred J. Douglas =

American politician from New York state

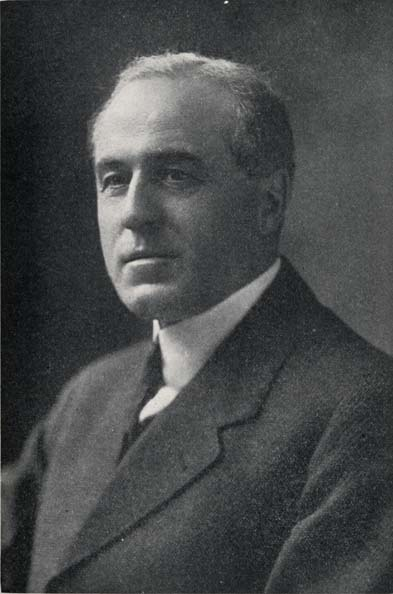

Member of the U.S. House of Representatives from New York's 33rd district
- In office January 3, 1937 – January 3, 1945
- Preceded by: Fred Sisson
- Succeeded by: Dean P. Taylor

Mayor of Utica, New York
- In office 1922–1924

Personal details
- Born: September 14, 1869 Clinton, Massachusetts, U.S.
- Died: January 1, 1949 (aged 79) Utica, New York, U.S.
- Resting place: Mount Olivet Cemetery, Whitesboro, New York
- Party: Republican
- Education: Dartmouth College

Fred James Douglas (September 14, 1869 – January 1, 1949) was a United States representative from New York. Born in Clinton, Worcester County, Massachusetts, he moved with his parents to Little Falls, New York, in 1874. He attended the public schools and was graduated from the medical department of Dartmouth College in 1895. He moved to Utica the same year and commenced the practice of medicine. He was a member of the board of education of Utica from 1910 to 1920 and was Mayor of Utica from 1922 to 1924. In 1928 and 1929 he was commissioner of public safety of Utica, and in 1934, he was an unsuccessful candidate for Lieutenant Governor of New York.

Douglas was elected as a Republican to the 75th and to the three succeeding Congresses, holding office from January 3, 1937, to January 3, 1945. He was an unsuccessful candidate for renomination in 1944 and resumed his former profession as a surgeon. In 1949, he died in Utica; interment was in Mount Olivet Cemetery, Whitesboro.

Party political offices
Preceded by F. Trubee Davison	Republican Party Nominee for Lieutenant Governor of New York; 1934	Succeeded by Ralph E. Robertson
U.S. House of Representatives
Preceded by Fred Sisson	Member of the U.S. House of Representatives from New York's 33rd congressional district 1937–1945	Succeeded by Dean P. Taylor
