= Charles S. Millington =

American politician and banker (1855–1913)

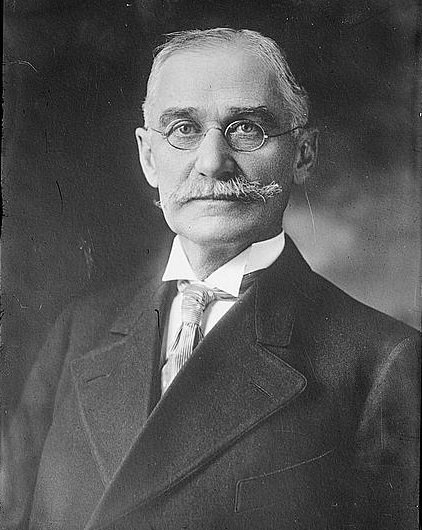

Member of the U.S. House of Representatives from New York's 27th district
- In office March 4, 1909 – March 3, 1911
- Preceded by: James S. Sherman
- Succeeded by: Charles A. Talcott

Personal details
- Born: Charles Stephen Millington; March 13, 1855 Norway, New York, U.S.
- Died: October 25, 1913 (aged 58) Herkimer, New York, U.S.
- Resting place: Pine Grove Cemetery; Poland, Herkimer County, New York, U.S.
- Party: Republican
- Spouse: Allie T. Webster (m. 1878)
- Children: 3
- Education: Fairfield Academy
- Profession: Politician; banker

Charles Stephen Millington (March 13, 1855 – October 25, 1913) was an American politician and banker from New York. He served as a U.S. representative from 1909 to 1911.

== Early life ==
Charles Stephen Millington was born on March 13, 1855, in Norway, New York, to Harty L. (née Lamberson) and Stephen R. Millington. He attended the district schools of Poland, the Fairfield Academy, and Hungerford Collegiate Institute.

== Career ==
At the age of 19, Millington began working at the Hungerford National Bank, Adams, New York. He organized and became the cashier of the Bank of Poland. In 1880, he reorganized the Bank of Poland into a national bank. He moved to Herkimer, New York, in 1894 and became vice president of the Herkimer Bank. In 1895, he became president of the bank and the bank became national in 1898. He was president of the First National Bank of Dolgeville and served as vice president of the Mohawk Valley Real Estate Company.

Millington served as a delegate to the 1908 Republican National Convention. He was elected as a Republican to the Sixty-first Congress (March 4, 1909 – March 3, 1911), representing the 27th district. He was an unsuccessful candidate for reelection in 1910 to the Sixty-second Congress.

Millington was appointed by President William Howard Taft as Assistant Treasurer of the United States in charge of the subtreasury in New York City on May 12, 1911, and served until his death.

== Personal life ==
Millington married Allie T. Webster, daughter of John Robert Webster, of Poland, on March 6, 1878. They had three children, Maud, Harty and Ada.

Millington lived on North Prospect Street in Herkimer. He died on October 25, 1913, in Herkimer. He was interred in Pine Grove Cemetery in Poland.

U.S. House of Representatives
Preceded by James S. Sherman	Member of the U.S. House of Representatives from New York's 27th congressional district 1909–1911	Succeeded by Charles A. Talcott
