= Augustus F. Allen =

American politician (1813–1875)

Augustus Allen
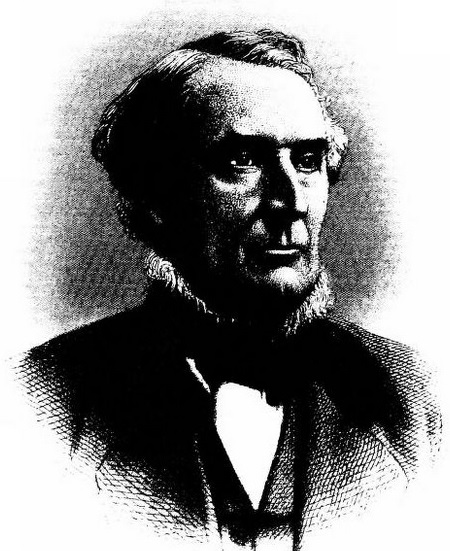

Member-elect of the U.S. House of Representatives from New York's 33rd district
- Died before taking office
- Preceded by: Constituency reestablished
- Succeeded by: Nelson I. Norton

Personal details
- Born: Augustus Franklin Allen; December 13, 1813 Wardsboro, Vermont, U.S.
- Died: January 20, 1875 (aged 61) Jamestown, New York, U.S.
- Resting place: Lake View Cemetery
- Party: Democratic (Before 1850s, 1872–1875); Republican (1850s–1870); Liberal Republican (1870–1872)

Augustus Franklin Allen (December 13, 1813 – January 20, 1875) was elected as a member of the United States Congress from New York's 33rd congressional district (Chautauqua and Cattaraugus Counties) in 1874. Allen died before he was able to take office.

== Biography ==
Allen was born in Wardsboro, Vermont, on December 13, 1813. When he was a child his family moved to Jamestown, New York. He was educated locally and began working as a store clerk at age 17 in order to support his family after his father's death. He resided in Ellicott, was successful in business, and later became a partner in a lumber yard, woolen mill, railroads and other ventures.

== Civil War ==
He served in the militia during the years before the American Civil War and attained the rank of colonel as commander of a regiment in which his brother Dascum served as his second-in-command. Augustus Allen later attained the rank of brigadier general before becoming inactive in the militia.

During the Civil War he was appointed to organize, equip, and train the 112th New York Infantry and commissioned as a colonel. He led the regiment for several months until being succeeded by Jeremiah C. Drake, who commanded until dying of wounds received at the Battle of Cold Harbor.

== Political career ==
Originally a Democrat, Allen became a Republican in the 1850s because of the new party's antislavery position. He served as Ellicott's Town Supervisor and a member of the Chautauqua County Board of Supervisors from 1847 to 1848, 1852, 1856, 1860 to 1868, and 1871 to 1874.

In 1867, he was elected to the New York Constitutional Convention. In 1874, he ran for the New York State Senate, but was defeated.

In 1874 Allen was elected to the United States House of Representatives, defeating incumbent Republican Walter L. Sessions by organizing a coalition of Democrats and former Liberal Republicans who had supported Horace Greeley for President in 1872.

== Death and burial ==
Allen had been ill during his campaign for Congress and died before the term started in March 1875. He died in Jamestown on January 20, 1875, and was buried in Lake View Cemetery in Jamestown.

== See also ==
- List of United States representatives-elect who never took their seats

U.S. House of Representatives
Constituency reestablished	Member-elect of the U.S. House of Representatives from New York's 33rd congressional district 1874–1875	Succeeded by Nelson I. Norton
