= William F. Walsh =

American politician (1912–2011)

William Francis Walsh
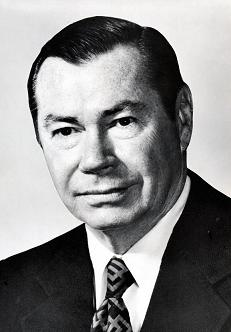

Member of the U.S. House of Representatives from New York's 33rd district
- In office January 3, 1973 – January 3, 1979
- Preceded by: Howard W. Robison
- Succeeded by: Gary A. Lee

48th Mayor of Syracuse
- In office 1961–1969
- Preceded by: Donald H. Mead
- Succeeded by: Lee Alexander

Personal details
- Born: July 11, 1912 Syracuse, New York, U.S.
- Died: January 8, 2011 (aged 98) Marcellus, New York, U.S.
- Party: Republican
- Spouse: Mary Dorsey Walsh
- Children: 7 (including James T. Walsh)
- Education: St. Bonaventure University; University at Buffalo

Military service
- Allegiance: United States
- Branch/service: United States Army Air Forces
- Years of service: 1941–1946
- Rank: Captain
- Unit: United States Army Air Forces
- Battles/wars: World War II

William Francis Walsh (July 11, 1912 – January 8, 2011) was a Republican-Conservative member of the United States House of Representatives from New York State.

== Biography ==
Walsh was born in Syracuse, New York, to Irish immigrant parents. He graduated from St. Bonaventure's College, now St. Bonaventure University, in 1934. He received a master's degree in social work from the University at Buffalo in 1949, and an honorary doctorate in civil law from St. Bonaventure University in 1970. He served in the United States Army Air Forces from 1941 to 1946, first as a private, and later being honorably discharged as a captain.

Walsh worked in social services, including serving as a field representative for the New York State Commission Against Discrimination. He was appointed Welfare Commissioner of Onondaga County in New York State in 1959. He was elected mayor of Syracuse in 1961, and served until 1969. He became more nationally known by serving as Vice President of the US Conference of Mayors. He was a delegate to the 1968 Republican National Convention. He was elected to Congress in 1972, and served from January 3, 1973, until January 3, 1979.

== Honors in memory ==
At St. Bonaventure University in St. Bonaventure, New York, the William F. Walsh Science Center was named in his honor in 2006 and dedicated in 2008. The Center was built as a result of $10 million in federal monies secured for its construction with the assistance of former United States Congress Member James T. Walsh, William's son, who is also a Republican.

== Personal life ==
Walsh was married to Mary Dorsey Walsh, and had seven children, all of whom pursued careers in public service. Walsh's children, Bill Walsh and Martha Hood Walsh are judges in Onondaga County, and James T. Walsh served in Congress for twenty years. His grandson Ben Walsh became Syracuse mayor in 2018.

Political offices
Preceded by Donald H. Mead	Mayor of Syracuse, NY; 1961–1969	Succeeded by Lee Alexander
U.S. House of Representatives
Preceded by Howard W. Robison	Member of the U.S. House of Representatives from New York's 33rd congressional district 1973–1979	Succeeded by Gary A. Lee
Honorary titles
Preceded by William H. Avery	Oldest living United States representative (Sitting or former); November 4, 2009 – January 8, 2011	Succeeded by Perkins Bass
