= John P. Taylor =

American judge

John Park Taylor (April 16, 1874 – February 24, 1934) served as District Attorney of Rensselaer County, New York from 1914 to 1920, and was posthumously honored with the dedication of the John P. Taylor Federal Housing Project, Troy, New York in 1954.

After his service as District Attorney, Taylor was in the private practice of Taylor & Taylor in Troy, New York with his sons, U.S. Representative Dean P. Taylor, who later served in the U.S. Congress from 1943 to 1961, and Judge Donald S. Taylor, who was later elected to the New York State Supreme Court in 1948, and appointed to the Appellate Division by Gov. Nelson Rockefeller on March 1, 1961.

John Park Taylor died in 1934, and is interred with his sons in Oakwood Cemetery, Troy, N.Y.
