= Wallace E. Pierce =

American politician

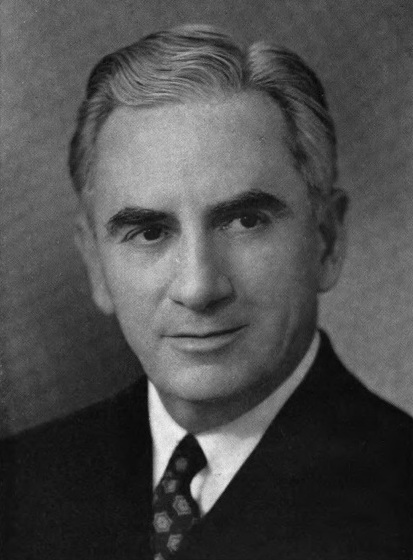

Member of the U.S. House of Representatives from New York's 31st district
- In office January 3, 1939 – January 3, 1940
- Preceded by: Bertrand Snell
- Succeeded by: Clarence E. Kilburn

Personal details
- Born: December 9, 1881 Black Brook, New York, US
- Died: January 3, 1940 (aged 58) Washington, D.C., US
- Party: Republican
- Education: Plattsburgh Normal School

Wallace Edgar Pierce (December 9, 1881 – January 3, 1940) was a Republican member of the United States House of Representatives from New York.

== Biography ==
Pierce was born in Black Brook, New York. He graduated from Plattsburgh Normal School in 1903. He served as a secretary to Congressman George R. Malby from 1909 until 1912 and Congressman Edwin A. Merritt from 1912 until 1914.

Pierce was a member of the New York State Assembly (Clinton Co.) in 1917, 1918 and 1919. He was chairman of the Clinton County Republican committee from 1926 until 1940. He was elected to Congress in 1938 and served from January 3, 1939, until his death in Washington, D.C., on January 3, 1940. Pierce was interred in Riverside Cemetery, Plattsburgh, New York.

== See also ==
- List of members of the United States Congress who died in office (1900–1949)

New York State Assembly
Preceded by William R. Weaver	New York State Assembly; Clinton County; 1917–1919	Succeeded by Charles M. Harrington
U.S. House of Representatives
Preceded by Bertrand H. Snell	Member of the U.S. House of Representatives from New York's 31st congressional district 1939–1940	Succeeded by Clarence E. Kilburn
