= Lee Alexander (politician) =

American attorney and politician

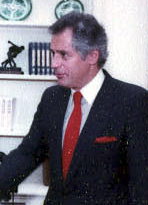

49th Mayor of Syracuse, New York
- In office 1970–1985
- Preceded by: William F. Walsh
- Succeeded by: Thomas Ganley Young

35th President of the United States Conference of Mayors
- In office 1977–1978
- Preceded by: Kenneth A. Gibson
- Succeeded by: William H. McNichols Jr.

Personal details
- Born: May 18, 1927 Jersey City, New Jersey, U.S.
- Died: December 25, 1996 (aged 69) Syracuse, New York, U.S.
- Education: Syracuse University; Syracuse University College of Law (JD)

Lee Alexander (May 18, 1927 – December 25, 1996) was an American attorney and politician who served as the mayor of Syracuse, New York for 16 years.

== Career ==
Alexander was born in Jersey City, New Jersey, and grew up in South Amboy, New Jersey. He served in the United States Army at the end of World War II. He then graduated from Syracuse University in 1950 and Syracuse University College of Law in 1955. Alexander practiced law in Syracuse. In 1966 he won election to the Syracuse City Council.

He was elected as mayor of Syracuse in 1969, and served from 1970 to 1985. He also served as the president of the United States Conference of Mayors in 1977 and 1978, and was elected six times as the president of the National Conference of Democratic Mayors.

He unsuccessfully ran for the United States Senate in 1974, coming in second place in the Democratic primary after former United States Attorney General Ramsey Clark.

=== Conviction ===
After Frederick Scullin was nominated to serve as a United States Attorney, a probe was established after rumors surfaced about Alexander's relationships with city contractors. Eventually, the Federal Bureau of Investigation and Internal Revenue Service joined the investigation.

On July 16, 1987, Alexander was indicted in the United States District Court for the Northern District of New York on 40 counts of extortion, income tax evasion, racketeering and conspiracy. In January 1988, Alexander pleaded guilty to racketeering and extortion, conspiracy to obstruct the Government's investigation and income-tax evasion on at least $1.2 million in bribes and kickbacks. As part of a plea bargain, he agreed to serve 10 years in prison and pay a $100,000 fine. Alexander spent nearly six years in jail for his crimes and was released from prison in 1994.

== Death ==
Alexander died at his home of cancer on December 25, 1996.

Political offices
Preceded by William F. Walsh	Mayor of Syracuse, New York; 1970–1985	Succeeded by Thomas Ganley Young
