= Frederick M. Davenport =

American politician (1866–1956)

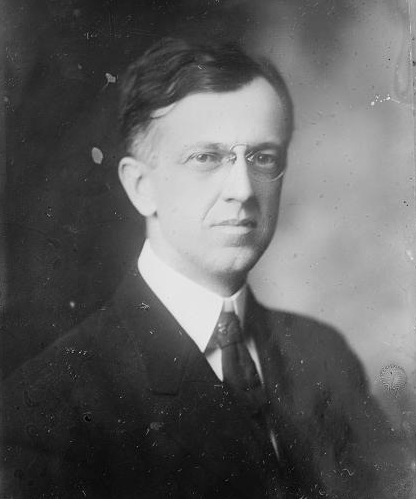
- Davenport, c. 1925

Member of the U.S. House of Representatives from New York's 33rd district
- In office March 4, 1925 – March 3, 1933
- Preceded by: Homer P. Snyder
- Succeeded by: Fred Sisson

New York State Senate (36th District)
- In office 1919–1924
- In office 1909–1910

Personal details
- Born: Frederick Morgan Davenport; August 27, 1866 Salem, Massachusetts
- Died: December 26, 1956 (aged 90) Washington, D.C.
- Party: Republican
- Other political affiliations: Progressive
- Education: Wesleyan University; Columbia University

Frederick Morgan Davenport (August 27, 1866 – December 26, 1956) was a Republican member of the United States House of Representatives from New York.

== Life and career ==
Davenport was born in Salem, Massachusetts, the son of Anna L. (Green) and David Davenport. He graduated from Wesleyan University in 1889; and from Columbia University in 1905. He taught political science at Hamilton College from 1904 to 1929.

He was a member of the New York State Senate (36th D.) in 1909 and 1910. He ran on the Progressive ticket for Lieutenant Governor of New York at the 1912 New York state election; and for Governor of New York at the 1914 New York state election.

He was again a member of the State Senate (36th D.) from 1919 to 1924, sitting in the 142nd, 143rd, 144th, 145th, 146th and 147th New York State Legislatures; and was a delegate to the 1924 Republican National Convention.

He was elected as a Republican to the 69th, 70th, 71st and 72nd United States Congresses, holding office from March 4, 1925, to March 3, 1933.

He died on December 26, 1956, in Washington, D.C.

== Sources ==
- United States Congress. "Frederick M. Davenport (id: D000070)". Biographical Directory of the United States Congress.

Party political offices
First	Progressive nominee for Lieutenant Governor of New York; 1912	Succeeded by Chauncey J. Hamlin
Preceded by Oscar Straus	Progressive Nominee for Governor of New York; 1914	Succeeded by Charles Seymour Whitman
New York State Senate
Preceded by Joseph Ackroyd	New York State Senate; 36th District; 1909–1910	Succeeded by T. Harvey Ferris
Preceded by Charles W. Wicks	New York State Senate; 36th District; 1919–1924	Succeeded by Henry D. Williams
U.S. House of Representatives
Preceded by Homer P. Snyder	Member of the U.S. House of Representatives from New York's 33rd congressional district 1925–1933	Succeeded by Fred J. Sisson
