= Miles Justice Knowlton =

American Baptist clergyman, missionary, academic and author (1825–1874)

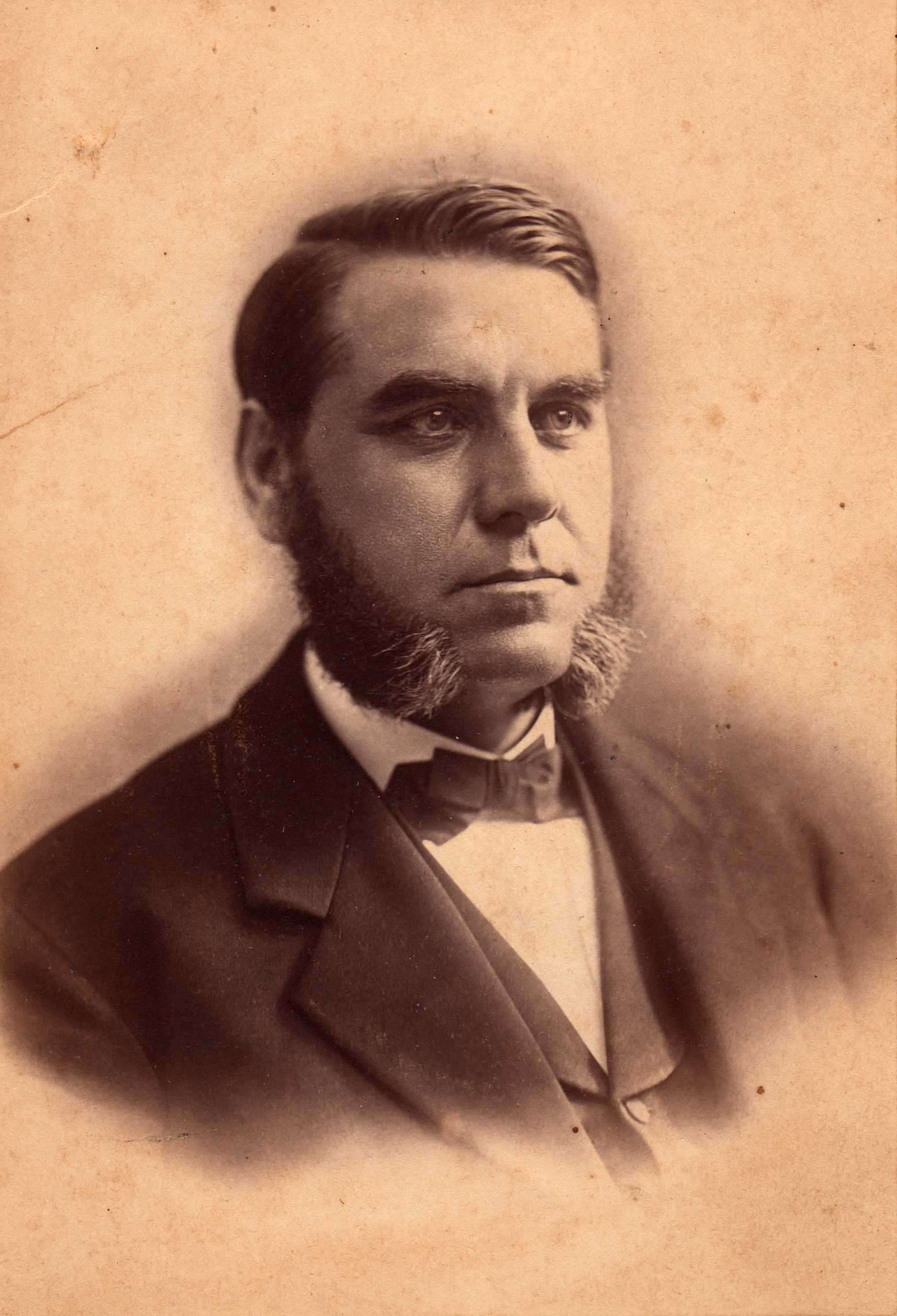
- Missionary to China
- Born: February 8, 1825; West Wardsboro, Vermont
- Died: 1874; Ningbo, China

Miles Justice Knowlton (February 8, 1825 – 1874) was an American Baptist clergyman, missionary to China, academic and author.

== Missionary career ==
Knowlton was born in 1825 in West Wardsboro, Vermont. He attended Madison University (renamed Colgate University in 1846) in Hamilton, New York, where he graduated from seminary. Upon his being ordained Baptist minister on October 8, 1853, he was sent to China as a missionary by the American Baptist Missionary Union. He arrived in Ningbo in June, 1854 accompanied by his wife, Lucy Ann St. John (1826 - 1907).

In China, Knowlton helped establish several smaller missions in the Ningbo region, and worked as an itinerant minister, regularly traveling to neighboring areas such as Chusan. He traveled to the United States in 1862 for health reasons, but returned to China 18 months later. He once again traveled to the United States in 1871, where he delivered a series of lectures at several theological seminaries. These were published under the title "The Foreign Missionary, His Field, and His Work". He also authored a prize essay titled "China as a Mission Field." He was also awarded a Doctor of Divinity degree from Colgate University during this trip.

Knowlton died in Ningbo in 1874.

== Publications ==
- Miles Justin Knowlton (1872). The Foreign Missionary: His Field and His Work. Philadelphia: Bible and Publication Society.
- China as a Mission Field (London, 1881)
