= Donald S. Taylor =

American judge

Judge of the New York Supreme Court / Appellate Division
- In office 1948 (Supreme Court) / March 1, 1961 (Appellate Division) – 1968

Personal details
- Born: June 17, 1898 Troy, NY
- Died: June 23, 1970 (aged 72)
- Resting place: Oakwood Cemetery, Troy, N.Y.
- Children: John P. Taylor
- Relatives: John P. Taylor (father); Dean P. Taylor (brother)
- Education: Colgate University (Class of 1919); Albany Law School (Class of 1922)
- Profession: Judge, lawyer

Donald S. Taylor (June 17, 1898 – June 23, 1970) served as a judge of the New York Supreme Court and Appellate Division for 20 years, and came from a family with a long history of public service to New York State.

== Biography ==
Taylor was born on June 17, 1898, in Troy, NY, and attended Colgate University, Hamilton, NY (Class of 1919), where he was a member of Theta Chi, and Albany Law School of Union University, Schenectady, NY (Class of 1922).

Taylor began practicing law with his father, John P. Taylor, a former District Attorney of Rensselaer County. Taylor and his father and brother, later U.S. Congressman, Dean P. Taylor, formed the law firm of Taylor & Taylor, later Wager, Taylor, Howd & LeForestier, in Troy, New York. After Taylor's withdrawal from active practice, the firm continued with his son John P. Taylor as Wager, Taylor, Howd & Brearton.

Taylor was first elected to the Supreme Court in 1948. On March 1, 1961, Gov. Nelson Rockefeller appointed Taylor to the bench, and he was reelected in 1962 and served until retirement in 1968. He died on June 23, 1970, and is interred with his brother in Oakwood Cemetery, Troy, N.Y.
