= Homer P. Snyder =

American politician

Homer Peter Snyder
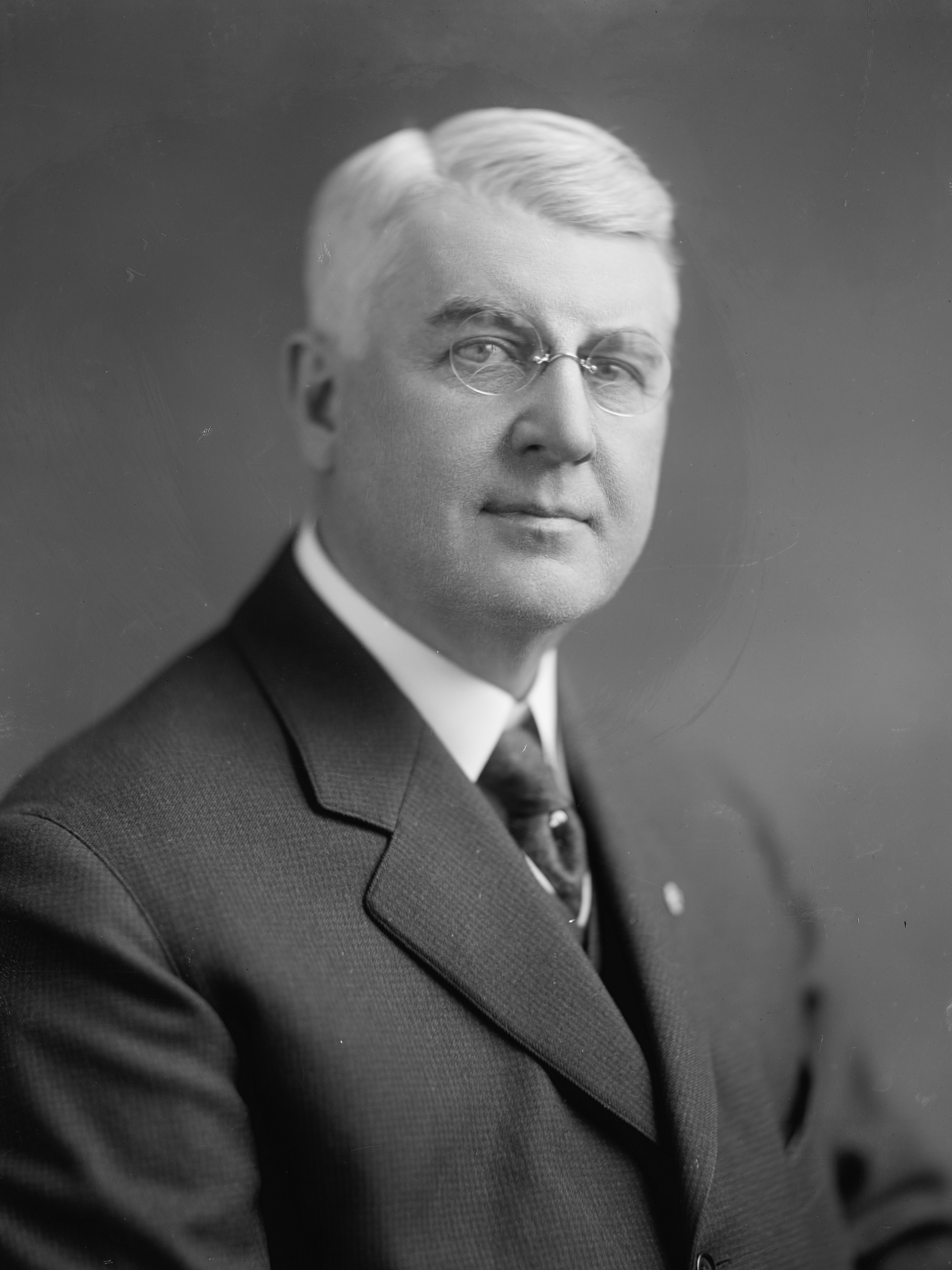

Member of the U.S. House of Representatives from New York's 33rd district
- In office March 4, 1915 – March 3, 1925
- Preceded by: Charles A. Talcott
- Succeeded by: Frederick M. Davenport

Chair of the United States House Committee on Indian Affairs
- In office March 3, 1921 – March 3, 1925
- Preceded by: Ralph Hall

Personal details
- Born: December 6, 1863 Amsterdam, New York
- Died: December 30, 1937 (aged 74) Little Falls, New York
- Party: Republican

Homer Peter Snyder (December 6, 1863 – December 30, 1937) (aka H.P. Snyder) was an American politician and businessman from New York. Snyder began his business career in the knitting industry, and moved to bicycle manufacturing. He left the company to began a political career, entering congress in 1915 and holding office until 1925. He became known for his advocacy on behalf of Native Americans, chairing the Committee on Indian Affairs and introducing the Indian Citizenship Act in 1924.

== Biography ==
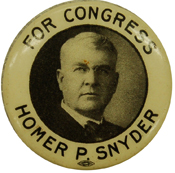
A 1912 campaign button

Born in Amsterdam, Montgomery County, New York, he attended the common schools and was employed in various capacities in knitting mills until 1887. He moved to Little Falls in 1887 and continued employment in knitting mills; he engaged in the manufacture of knitting machinery in 1890 and, later, of bicycles and other wheeled vehicles. Snyder co-founded a bicycle manufacturing firm with Michael Fisher in 1895. Three years later, Fisher left the company and Snyder incorporated it as the H. P. Snyder Manufacturing Company. Snyder led this company until 1913.

Snyder was director and vice president of the Little Falls National Bank and served one term as school commissioner in 1895 and two terms as fire and police commissioner of Little Falls in 1910 and 1911.

He was an unsuccessful candidate for election in 1912 to the Sixty-third Congress, and was elected as a Republican to the Sixty-fourth and to the four succeeding Congresses, holding office from March 4, 1915, to March 3, 1925. He was chairman of the Committee on Indian Affairs (Sixty-sixth through Sixty-eighth Congresses) and a member of the Committee on World War Veterans' Legislation (Sixty-eighth Congress). On the former committee, his most significant achievement was sponsoring the landmark Indian Citizenship Act of 1924 (also called the Snyder Act), which granted citizenship to all of the United States' Indian population. An obituary of Snyder published in The New York Times described him as "one of the outstanding and outspoken champions" of Native Americans.

Snyder was a delegate to the Republican National Conventions in 1916 and 1920 and was not a candidate for reelection in 1924. He resumed his former manufacturing pursuits and in 1937 died at his home in Little Falls; interment was in the Church Street Cemetery.

== H.P. Snyder Manufacturing Company ==
In 1894 or 1895, Snyder and Michael Fisher co-founded the Snyder & Fisher Bicycle Works, a bicycle manufacturing firm in Little Falls, NY. Three years later, Fisher left the company and Snyder incorporated it as the H.P. Snyder Manufacturing Company. Snyder led this company until 1913. The company manufactured bicycles until the mid-1970s.

Snyder & Fisher's first bicycles were named the Newport Swell and the Newport Belle. In the mid-to-late 1890s, Snyder manufactured Laclede brand bicycles for E.C. Simmons, supplementing Simmons' other Laclede bicycle manufacturing being done in St. Louis, MO.

The D.P. Harris Hardware and Manufacturing Company originated the "Rollfast" bicycle name in the 1890s. In the early 1900s, Harris teamed up with Snyder, Snyder being the primary manufacturer of the bicycles, with Harris providing some parts and doing the marketing. Shortly after WWI, the two companies decided that Harris would stop making complete bikes and Snyder would buy all their hardware (cranks, stems, etc.) from Harris. Snyder/Harris then started buying up struggling bike companies, including Peerless, Great Western, Pioneer, Overland and possibly others.

Mohawk bicycles were built by Snyder between 1925 and 1972. H.P. Snyder was chairman of the Indian Affairs Committee which sponsored the Indian Citizenship Act of 1924 (aka the Snyder Act). This legislation granted U.S. citizenship to all Native Americans. To recognize the legislation, H.P. ordered the construction of the Mohawk Bicycle. He chose the Mohawk name because the Mohawk people were originally based in the valley of the Mohawk River which runs on the south side of Little Falls, NY, the home of Snyder's main plant.

A 1927 Snyder Boy's Bicycle, designed to look like a contemporary motorcycle, is displayed at the Smithsonian National Museum of American History.

During the Great Depression, Snyder began manufacturing bikes for other retailers including Montgomery Ward, who sold them under the Hawthorne name.

In 1938, Snyder acquired the Excelsior Mfg Co cycling company located in Michigan City, Indiana (not to be confused with the Chicago-based Excelsior cycling company, owned by Schwinn) and used it as an assembly plant and Midwest shipping hub for bicycles they made for D.P. Harris (Rollfast), Montgomery Ward, and others. Among others, Rollfast Hopalong Cassidy bicycles were assembled there.

In early 1973, Mossberg purchased the stock of the HP Snyder company. At that time, Snyder mostly made bikes for DP Harris under the "Rollfast" name, as well as contracts for Montgomery Ward. Shortly thereafter, Mossberg started selling bikes to Western Auto, Sears, and other distributors that Mossberg had contracts with for firearms and other products. Around 1976, Mossberg lost their contracts with DP Harris and Ward, and terminated Snyder's bicycle production on May 7, 1976 after 81 continuous years in business.

== Bibliography ==
- Epperson, Bruce D. (2014-01-10). Peddling Bicycles to America: The Rise of an Industry. McFarland. pp. 189, 218–219. ISBN 978-0-7864-5623-9.

U.S. House of Representatives
Preceded by Charles A. Talcott	Member of the U.S. House of Representatives from New York's 33rd congressional district 1915–1925	Succeeded by Frederick M. Davenport
