= List of United States representatives in the 76th Congress =

This is a complete list of United States representatives during the 76th United States Congress listed by seniority.
As an historical article, the districts and party affiliations listed reflect those during the 76th Congress (January 3, 1939 – January 3, 1941). Seats and party affiliations on similar lists for other congresses will be different for certain members.

Seniority depends on the date on which members were sworn into office. Since many members are sworn in on the same day, subsequent ranking is based on previous congressional service of the individual and then by alphabetical order by the last name of the representative.

Committee chairmanship in the House is often associated with seniority. However, party leadership is typically not associated with seniority.

Note: The "*" indicates that the representative/delegate may have served one or more non-consecutive terms while in the House of Representatives of the United States Congress.

== U.S. House seniority list ==
U.S. House seniority
Rank	Representative	Party	District	Seniority date (Previous service, if any)	No.# of term(s)	Notes
1	Adolph J. Sabath	D	IL-05	March 4, 1907	17th term	Dean of the House
2	Edward T. Taylor	D	CO-04	March 4, 1909	16th term	
3	Robert L. Doughton	D	NC-09	March 4, 1911	15th term	
4	Carl E. Mapes	R	MI-05	March 4, 1913	14th term	Died on December 12, 1939.
5	Sam Rayburn	D	TX-04	March 4, 1913	14th term	
6	Hatton W. Sumners	D	TX-05	March 4, 1913	14th term	
7	Allen T. Treadway	R	MA-01	March 4, 1913	14th term	
8	Carl Vinson	D	GA-06	November 3, 1914	14th term	
9	Henry B. Steagall	D	AL-03	March 4, 1915	13th term	
10	George H. Tinkham	R	MA-10	March 4, 1915	13th term	
11	William B. Bankhead	D	AL-07	March 4, 1917	12th term	Speaker of the House; Died on September 15, 1940.
12	John Marvin Jones	D	TX-18	March 4, 1917	12th term	Resigned on November 20, 1940.
13	Harold Knutson	R	MN-06	March 4, 1917	12th term	
14	Clarence F. Lea	D	CA-01	March 4, 1917	12th term	
15	Joseph J. Mansfield	D	TX-09	March 4, 1917	12th term	
16	Christopher D. Sullivan	D	NY-13	March 4, 1917	12th term	Left the House in 1941.
17	S. Otis Bland	D	VA-01	July 2, 1918	12th term	
18	Frank Crowther	R	NY-30	March 4, 1919	11th term	
19	Thomas H. Cullen	D	NY-04	March 4, 1919	11th term	
20	Daniel A. Reed	R	NY-43	March 4, 1919	11th term	
21	J. Will Taylor	R	TN-02	March 4, 1919	11th term	Died on November 14, 1939.
22	Fritz G. Lanham	D	TX-12	April 19, 1919	11th term	
23	Patrick H. Drewry	D	VA-04	April 27, 1920	11th term	
24	Hamilton Fish Jr.	R	NY-26	November 2, 1920	11th term	
25	Hampton P. Fulmer	D	SC-02	March 4, 1921	10th term	
26	Thomas Alan Goldsborough	D	MD-01	March 4, 1921	10th term	Resigned on April 5, 1939.
27	John E. Rankin	D	MS-01	March 4, 1921	10th term	
28	Roy O. Woodruff	R	MI-10	March 4, 1921; Previous service, 1913–1915.	11th term*	
29	Charles L. Gifford	R	MA-15	November 7, 1922	10th term	
30	Sol Bloom	D	NY-19	March 4, 1923	9th term	
31	Clarence Cannon	D	MO-09	March 4, 1923	9th term	
32	Emanuel Celler	D	NY-10	March 4, 1923	9th term	
33	Robert Crosser	D	OH-21	March 4, 1923; Previous service, 1913–1919.	12th term*	
34	Samuel Dickstein	D	NY-12	March 4, 1923	9th term	
35	Luther Alexander Johnson	D	TX-06	March 4, 1923	9th term	
36	Samuel Davis McReynolds	D	TN-03	March 4, 1923	9th term	Died on July 11, 1939.
37	Milton A. Romjue	D	MO-01	March 4, 1923; Previous service, 1917–1921.	11th term*	
38	George N. Seger	R	NJ-08	March 4, 1923	9th term	Died on August 26, 1940.
39	John Taber	R	NY-36	March 4, 1923	9th term	
40	Clifton A. Woodrum	D	VA-06	March 4, 1923	9th term	
41	John H. Kerr	D	NC-02	November 6, 1923	9th term	
42	Albert E. Carter	R	CA-06	March 4, 1925	8th term	
43	Edward E. Cox	D	GA-02	March 4, 1925	8th term	
44	Charles Aubrey Eaton	R	NJ-05	March 4, 1925	8th term	
45	Robert A. Green	D	FL-02	March 4, 1925	8th term	
46	Thomas A. Jenkins	R	OH-10	March 4, 1925	8th term	
47	Joseph William Martin Jr.	R	MA-14	March 4, 1925	8th term	
48	Thomas S. McMillan	D	SC-01	March 4, 1925	8th term	Died on September 29, 1939.
49	Mary Teresa Norton	D	NJ-13	March 4, 1925	8th term	
50	Andrew Lawrence Somers	D	NY-06	March 4, 1925	8th term	
51	William Madison Whittington	D	MS-03	March 4, 1925	8th term	
52	Lindsay Carter Warren	D	NC-01	March 4, 1925	8th term	Resigned on October 31, 1940.
53	Edith Nourse Rogers	R	MA-05	June 30, 1925	8th term	
54	Harry Lane Englebright	R	CA-02	August 31, 1926	8th term	
55	Richard J. Welch	R	CA-05	August 31, 1926	8th term	
56	John J. Cochran	D	MO-13	November 2, 1926	8th term	
57	Wilburn Cartwright	D	OK-03	March 4, 1927	7th term	
58	James M. Fitzpatrick	D	NY-24	March 4, 1927	7th term	
59	Ulysses Samuel Guyer	R	KS-02	March 4, 1927; Previous service, 1924–1925.	8th term*	
60	Clifford R. Hope	R	KS-07	March 4, 1927	7th term	
61	Jed Johnson	D	OK-06	March 4, 1927	7th term	
62	William I. Sirovich	D	NY-14	March 4, 1927	7th term	Died on December 17, 1939.
63	Malcolm C. Tarver	D	GA-07	March 4, 1927	7th term	
64	Charles A. Wolverton	R	NJ-01	March 4, 1927	7th term	
65	René L. De Rouen	D	LA-07	August 23, 1927	7th term	Left the House in 1941.
66	Clarence E. Hancock	R	NY-35	November 8, 1927	7th term	
67	Francis D. Culkin	R	NY-32	November 6, 1928	7th term	
68	John William McCormack	D	MA-12	November 6, 1928	7th term	
69	Richard B. Wigglesworth	R	MA-13	November 6, 1928	7th term	
70	James Wolfenden	R	PA-08	November 6, 1928	7th term	
71	J. Bayard Clark	D	NC-07	March 4, 1929	6th term	
72	Jere Cooper	D	TN-08	March 4, 1929	6th term	
73	Wall Doxey	D	MS-02	March 4, 1929	6th term	
74	Fred A. Hartley	R	NJ-10	March 4, 1929	6th term	
75	William P. Lambertson	R	KS-01	March 4, 1929	6th term	
76	Louis Ludlow	D	IN-12	March 4, 1929	6th term	
77	Wright Patman	D	TX-01	March 4, 1929	6th term	
78	Joe L. Smith	D	WV-06	March 4, 1929	6th term	
79	Robert Ramspeck	D	GA-05	October 2, 1929	6th term	
80	Joseph A. Gavagan	D	NY-21	November 5, 1929	6th term	
81	J. Roland Kinzer	R	PA-10	January 28, 1930	6th term	
82	Martin J. Kennedy	D	NY-18	April 11, 1930	6th term	
83	Claude V. Parsons	D	IL-24	November 4, 1930	6th term	Left the House in 1941.
84	Robert F. Rich	R	PA-16	November 4, 1930	6th term	
85	Walter G. Andrews	R	NY-40	March 4, 1931	5th term	
86	Harry P. Beam	D	IL-04	March 4, 1931	5th term	
87	John W. Boehne Jr.	D	IN-08	March 4, 1931	5th term	
88	Patrick J. Boland	D	PA-11	March 4, 1931	5th term	
89	Alfred L. Bulwinkle	D	NC-10	March 4, 1931; Previous service, 1921–1929.	9th term*	
90	Thomas G. Burch	D	VA-05	March 4, 1931	5th term	
91	Virgil Chapman	D	KY-07	March 4, 1931; Previous service, 1925–1929.	7th term*	
92	Eugene B. Crowe	D	IN-09	March 4, 1931	5th term	Left the House in 1941.
93	William Purington Cole Jr.	D	MD-02	March 4, 1931; Previous service, 1927–1929.	6th term*	
94	Martin Dies Jr.	D	TX-02	March 4, 1931	5th term	
95	Wesley Ernest Disney	D	OK-01	March 4, 1931	5th term	
96	Joachim O. Fernández	D	LA-01	March 4, 1931	5th term	Left the House in 1941.
97	John W. Flannagan Jr.	D	VA-09	March 4, 1931	5th term	
98	Fred C. Gilchrist	R	IA-08	March 4, 1931	5th term	
99	Pehr G. Holmes	R	MA-04	March 4, 1931	5th term	
100	Kent E. Keller	D	IL-25	March 4, 1931	5th term	Left the House in 1941.
101	Edward A. Kelly	D	IL-03	March 4, 1931	5th term	
102	William Larrabee	D	IN-11	March 4, 1931	5th term	
103	Paul H. Maloney	D	LA-02	March 4, 1931	5th term	Resigned on December 15, 1940.
104	Andrew J. May	D	KY-06	March 4, 1931	5th term	
105	James G. Polk	D	OH-06	March 4, 1931	5th term	
106	Leonard W. Schuetz	D	IL-07	March 4, 1931	5th term	
107	Joe Shannon	D	MO-05	March 4, 1931	5th term	
108	Howard W. Smith	D	VA-08	March 4, 1931	5th term	
109	Brent Spence	D	KY-05	March 4, 1931	5th term	
110	William H. Sutphin	D	NJ-03	March 4, 1931	5th term	
111	R. Ewing Thomason	D	TX-16	March 4, 1931	5th term	
112	Zebulon Weaver	D	NC-11	March 4, 1931; Previous service, 1917–1919 and 1919–1929.	11th term**	
113	Clyde Williams	D	MO-08	March 4, 1931; Previous service, 1927–1929.	6th term*	
114	Jesse P. Wolcott	R	MI-07	March 4, 1931	5th term	
115	John J. Delaney	D	NY-07	November 3, 1931; Previous service, 1918–1919.	6th term*	
116	Martin L. Sweeney	D	OH-20	November 3, 1931	5th term	
117	Richard M. Kleberg	D	TX-14	November 24, 1931	5th term	
118	Ambrose Jerome Kennedy	D	MD-04	November 8, 1932	5th term	Left the House in 1941.
119	Leo E. Allen	R	IL-13	March 4, 1933	4th term	
120	Frank H. Buck	D	CA-03	March 4, 1933	4th term	
121	Millard F. Caldwell	D	FL-03	March 4, 1933	4th term	Left the House in 1941.
122	William M. Colmer	D	MS-06	March 4, 1933	4th term	
123	William B. Cravens	D	AR-04	March 4, 1933; Previous service, 1907–1913.	7th term*	Died on January 13, 1939.
124	Fred N. Cummings	D	CO-02	March 4, 1933	4th term	Left the House in 1941.
125	Everett Dirksen	R	IL-16	March 4, 1933	4th term	
126	John D. Dingell Sr.	D	MI-15	March 4, 1933	4th term	
127	J. William Ditter	R	PA-17	March 4, 1933	4th term	
128	George Anthony Dondero	R	MI-17	March 4, 1933	4th term	
129	Richard M. Duncan	D	MO-03	March 4, 1933	4th term	
130	Matthew A. Dunn	D	PA-34	March 4, 1933	4th term	Left the House in 1941.
131	Charles I. Faddis	D	PA-25	March 4, 1933	4th term	
132	Thomas F. Ford	D	CA-14	March 4, 1933	4th term	
133	Dow W. Harter	D	OH-14	March 4, 1933	4th term	
134	Arthur Daniel Healey	D	MA-08	March 4, 1933	4th term	
135	Knute Hill	D	WA-04	March 4, 1933	4th term	
136	George W. Johnson	D	WV-04	March 4, 1933; Previous service, 1923–1925.	5th term*	
137	John Kee	D	WV-05	March 4, 1933	4th term	
138	Leo Kocialkowski	D	IL-08	March 4, 1933	4th term	
139	Charles Kramer	D	CA-13	March 4, 1933	4th term	
140	William Lemke	R	ND	March 4, 1933	4th term	Left the House in 1941.
141	John Lesinski Sr.	D	MI-16	March 4, 1933	4th term	
142	Lawrence Lewis	D	CO-01	March 4, 1933	4th term	
143	John Andrew Martin	D	CO-03	March 4, 1933; Previous service, 1909–1913.	6th term*	Died on December 23, 1939.
144	Donald H. McLean	R	NJ-06	March 4, 1933	4th term	
145	James W. Mott	R	OR-01	March 4, 1933	4th term	
146	Orrice Abram Murdock Jr.	D	UT-01	March 4, 1933	4th term	Left the House in 1941.
147	Emmett Marshall Owen	D	GA-04	March 4, 1933	4th term	Died on June 21, 1939.
148	J. Hardin Peterson	D	FL-01	March 4, 1933	4th term	
149	Walter M. Pierce	D	OR-02	March 4, 1933	4th term	
150	D. Lane Powers	R	NJ-04	March 4, 1933	4th term	
151	Jennings Randolph	D	WV-02	March 4, 1933	4th term	
152	B. Carroll Reece	R	TN-01	March 4, 1933; Previous service, 1921–1931.	9th term*	
153	James P. Richards	D	SC-05	March 4, 1933	4th term	
154	Absalom Willis Robertson	D	VA-07	March 4, 1933	4th term	
155	J. W. Robinson	D	UT-02	March 4, 1933	4th term	
156	Will Rogers	D	OK	March 4, 1933	4th term	
157	Edwin M. Schaefer	D	IL-22	March 4, 1933	4th term	
158	William T. Schulte	D	IN-01	March 4, 1933	4th term	
159	James G. Scrugham	D	NV	March 4, 1933	4th term	
160	Robert T. Secrest	D	OH-15	March 4, 1933	4th term	
161	Martin F. Smith	D	WA-03	March 4, 1933	4th term	
162	J. Buell Snyder	D	PA-24	March 4, 1933	4th term	
163	Clarence W. Turner	D	TN-06	March 4, 1933; Previous service, 1922–1923.	5th term*	Died on March 23, 1939.
164	James Wolcott Wadsworth Jr.	R	NY-39	March 4, 1933	4th term	
165	Monrad Wallgren	D	WA-02	March 4, 1933	4th term	Resigned on December 19, 1940.
166	Francis E. Walter	D	PA-21	March 4, 1933	4th term	
167	Compton I. White	D	ID-01	March 4, 1933	4th term	
168	Reuben T. Wood	D	MO-06	March 4, 1933	4th term	Left the House in 1941.
169	Milton H. West	D	TX-15	April 23, 1933	4th term	
170	Paul Brown	D	GA-10	July 5, 1933	4th term	
171	Andrew Edmiston Jr.	D	WV-03	November 28, 1933	4th term	
172	David D. Terry	D	AR-05	December 19, 1933	4th term	
173	Charles Albert Plumley	R	VT	January 16, 1934	4th term	
174	Harold D. Cooley	D	NC-04	July 7, 1934	4th term	
175	August H. Andresen	R	MN-01	January 3, 1935; Previous service, 1925–1933.	7th term*	
176	Leslie C. Arends	R	IL-17	January 3, 1935	3rd term	
177	William A. Ashbrook	D	OH-17	January 3, 1935; Previous service, 1907–1921.	10th term*	Died on January 1, 1940.
178	Graham Arthur Barden	D	NC-03	January 3, 1935	3rd term	
179	C. Jasper Bell	D	MO-04	January 3, 1935	3rd term	
180	Owen Brewster	R	ME-03	January 3, 1935	3rd term	Left the House in 1941.
181	Rich T. Buckler	D	MN-09	January 3, 1935	3rd term	
182	Charles A. Buckley	D	NY-23	January 3, 1935	3rd term	
183	Usher Burdick	R	ND	January 3, 1935	3rd term	
184	Frank Carlson	R	KS-06	January 3, 1935	3rd term	
185	Joseph E. Casey	D	MA-03	January 3, 1935	3rd term	
186	Walter Chandler	D	TN-09	January 3, 1935	3rd term	Resigned on January 2, 1940.
187	Ralph E. Church	R	IL-10	January 3, 1935	3rd term	Left the House in 1941.
188	Harry B. Coffee	D	NE-05	January 3, 1935	3rd term	
189	W. Sterling Cole	R	NY-37	January 3, 1935	3rd term	
190	John M. Costello	D	CA-15	January 3, 1935	3rd term	
191	Fred L. Crawford	R	MI-08	January 3, 1935	3rd term	
192	J. Burrwood Daly	D	PA-04	January 3, 1935	3rd term	Died on March 12, 1939.
193	John J. Dempsey	D	NM	January 3, 1935	3rd term	Left the House in 1941.
194	Albert J. Engel	D	MI-09	January 3, 1935	3rd term	
195	Marcellus H. Evans	D	NY-05	January 3, 1935	3rd term	Left the House in 1941.
196	Phil Ferguson	D	OK-08	January 3, 1935	3rd term	Left the House in 1941.
197	Aaron L. Ford	D	MS-04	January 3, 1935	3rd term	
198	Bertrand W. Gearhart	R	CA-09	January 3, 1935	3rd term	
199	Bernard J. Gehrmann	P	WI-10	January 3, 1935	3rd term	
200	John W. Gwynne	R	IA-03	January 3, 1935	3rd term	
201	Edward J. Hart	D	NJ-14	January 3, 1935	3rd term	
202	Thomas C. Hennings Jr.	D	MO-11	January 3, 1935	3rd term	Resigned on December 31, 1940.
203	Sam Hobbs	D	AL-04	January 3, 1935	3rd term	
204	Clare Hoffman	R	MI-04	January 3, 1935	3rd term	
205	Frank Eugene Hook	D	MI-12	January 3, 1935	3rd term	
206	John Mills Houston	D	KS-05	January 3, 1935	3rd term	
207	Merlin Hull	R	WI-09	January 3, 1935; Previous service, 1929–1931.	4th term*	
208	Bert Lord	R	NY-34	January 3, 1935	3rd term	Died on May 24, 1939.
209	Melvin Maas	R	MN-04	January 3, 1935; Previous service, 1927–1933.	6th term*	
210	George H. Mahon	D	TX-19	January 3, 1935	3rd term	
211	Sam C. Massingale	D	OK-07	January 3, 1935	3rd term	
212	Dan R. McGehee	D	MS-07	January 3, 1935	3rd term	
213	James McAndrews	D	IL-09	January 3, 1935; Previous service, 1901–1905 and 1913–1921.	9th term**	Left the House in 1941.
214	Raymond S. McKeough	D	IL-02	January 3, 1935	3rd term	
215	Charles F. McLaughlin	D	NE-02	January 3, 1935	3rd term	
216	Matthew J. Merritt	D	NY	January 3, 1935	3rd term	
217	Earl C. Michener	R	MI-02	January 3, 1935; Previous service, 1919–1933.	10th term*	
218	Arthur W. Mitchell	D	IL-01	January 3, 1935	3rd term	
219	William L. Nelson	D	MO-02	January 3, 1935; Previous service, 1919–1921 and 1925–1933.	8th term**	
220	John Conover Nichols	D	OK-02	January 3, 1935	3rd term	
221	Caroline Love Goodwin O'Day	D	NY	January 3, 1935	3rd term	
222	James A. O'Leary	D	NY-11	January 3, 1935	3rd term	
223	Emmet O'Neal	D	KY-03	January 3, 1935	3rd term	
224	Nat Patton	D	TX-07	January 3, 1935	3rd term	
225	Herron C. Pearson	D	TN-07	January 3, 1935	3rd term	
226	Hugh Peterson	D	GA-01	January 3, 1935	3rd term	
227	Joseph L. Pfeifer	D	NY-03	January 3, 1935	3rd term	
228	Louis C. Rabaut	D	MI-14	January 3, 1935	3rd term	
229	Chauncey W. Reed	R	IL-11	January 3, 1935	3rd term	
230	John M. Robsion	R	KY-09	January 3, 1935; Previous service, 1919–1930.	9th term*	
231	Elmer Ryan	D	MN-02	January 3, 1935	3rd term	Left the House in 1941.
232	James A. Shanley	D	CT-03	January 3, 1935	3rd term	
233	Dewey Jackson Short	R	MO-07	January 3, 1935; Previous service, 1929–1931.	4th term*	
234	J. Joseph Smith	D	CT-05	January 3, 1935	3rd term	
235	Charles L. South	D	TX-21	January 3, 1935	3rd term	
236	Joe Starnes	D	AL-05	January 3, 1935	3rd term	
237	Karl Stefan	R	NE-03	January 3, 1935	3rd term	
238	John H. Tolan	D	CA-07	January 3, 1935	3rd term	
239	B. Frank Whelchel	D	GA-09	January 3, 1935	3rd term	
240	Orville Zimmerman	D	MO-10	January 3, 1935	3rd term	
241	Charles A. Halleck	R	IN-02	January 29, 1935	3rd term	
242	Frank W. Boykin	D	AL-01	July 30, 1935	3rd term	
243	William Bernard Barry	D	NY-02	November 5, 1935	3rd term	
244	Edward W. Creal	D	KY-04	November 5, 1935	3rd term	
245	Edward W. Curley	D	NY-22	November 5, 1935	3rd term	Died on January 6, 1940.
246	A. Leonard Allen	D	LA-08	January 3, 1937	2nd term	
247	Robert G. Allen	D	PA-28	January 3, 1937	2nd term	Left the House in 1941.
248	Charles Arthur Anderson	D	MO-12	January 3, 1937	2nd term	Left the House in 1941.
249	Laurence F. Arnold	D	IL-23	January 3, 1937	2nd term	
250	George J. Bates	R	MA-06	January 3, 1937	2nd term	
251	Lyle Boren	D	OK-04	January 3, 1937	2nd term	
252	Michael J. Bradley	D	PA-03	January 3, 1937	2nd term	
253	Overton Brooks	D	LA-04	January 3, 1937	2nd term	
254	William T. Byrne	D	NY-28	January 3, 1937	2nd term	
255	Francis Case	R	SD-02	January 3, 1937	2nd term	
256	Charles R. Clason	R	MA-02	January 3, 1937	2nd term	
257	Harold K. Claypool	D	OH-11	January 3, 1937	2nd term	
258	E. Harold Cluett	R	NY-29	January 3, 1937	2nd term	
259	John M. Coffee	D	WA-06	January 3, 1937	2nd term	
260	Ross A. Collins	D	MS-05	January 3, 1937; Previous service, 1921–1935.	9th term*	
261	Fred J. Douglas	R	NY-33	January 3, 1937	2nd term	
262	Cassius C. Dowell	R	IA-06	January 3, 1937; Previous service, 1915–1935.	12th term*	Died on February 4, 1940.
263	Herman P. Eberharter	D	PA-32	January 3, 1937	2nd term	
264	J. Harold Flannery	D	PA-12	January 3, 1937	2nd term	
265	Frank W. Fries	D	IL-21	January 3, 1937	2nd term	Left the House in 1941.
266	Clyde L. Garrett	D	TX-17	January 3, 1937	2nd term	Left the House in 1941.
267	Noble Jones Gregory	D	KY-01	January 3, 1937	2nd term	
268	John K. Griffith	D	LA-06	January 3, 1937	2nd term	Left the House in 1941.
269	Vincent F. Harrington	D	IA-09	January 3, 1937	2nd term	
270	Franck R. Havenner	D	CA-04	January 3, 1937	2nd term	Left the House in 1941.
271	Joe Hendricks	D	FL-05	January 3, 1937	2nd term	
272	John F. Hunter	D	OH-09	January 3, 1937	2nd term	
273	Edouard Izac	D	CA-20	January 3, 1937	2nd term	
274	William S. Jacobsen	D	IA-02	January 3, 1937	2nd term	
275	Pete Jarman	D	AL-06	January 3, 1937	2nd term	
276	Benjamin Jarrett	R	PA-20	January 3, 1937	2nd term	
277	Eugene James Keogh	D	NY-09	January 3, 1937	2nd term	
278	Michael J. Kirwan	D	OH-19	January 3, 1937	2nd term	
279	Wade H. Kitchens	D	AR-07	January 3, 1937	2nd term	Left the House in 1941.
280	Charles H. Leavy	D	WA-05	January 3, 1937	2nd term	
281	Robert Luce	R	MA-09	January 3, 1937; Previous service, 1919–1935.	10th term*	Left the House in 1941.
282	Warren Magnuson	D	WA-01	January 3, 1937	2nd term	
283	Noah M. Mason	R	IL-12	January 3, 1937	2nd term	
284	James P. McGranery	D	PA-02	January 3, 1937	2nd term	
285	Newt V. Mills	D	LA-05	January 3, 1937	2nd term	
286	Guy L. Moser	D	PA-14	January 3, 1937	2nd term	
287	Robert L. Mouton	D	LA-03	January 3, 1937	2nd term	Left the House in 1941.
288	John R. Murdock	D	AZ	January 3, 1937	2nd term	
289	James C. Oliver	R	ME-01	January 3, 1937	2nd term	
290	James F. O'Connor	D	MT-02	January 3, 1937	2nd term	
291	Donald Lawrence O'Toole	D	NY-08	January 3, 1937	2nd term	
292	Stephen Pace	D	GA-03	January 3, 1937	2nd term	
293	Luther Patrick	D	AL-09	January 3, 1937	2nd term	
294	William R. Poage	D	TX-11	January 3, 1937	2nd term	
295	Edward Herbert Rees	R	KS-04	January 3, 1937	2nd term	
296	Albert G. Rutherford	R	PA-15	January 3, 1937	2nd term	
297	Leon Sacks	D	PA-01	January 3, 1937	2nd term	
298	Paul W. Shafer	R	MI-03	January 3, 1937	2nd term	
299	Harry R. Sheppard	D	CA-19	January 3, 1937	2nd term	
300	Clyde H. Smith	R	ME-02	January 3, 1937	2nd term	Died on April 8, 1940.
301	John Sparkman	D	AL-08	January 3, 1937	2nd term	
302	Albert Thomas	D	TX-08	January 3, 1937	2nd term	
303	J. Parnell Thomas	R	NJ-07	January 3, 1937	2nd term	
304	Jerry Voorhis	D	CA-12	January 3, 1937	2nd term	
305	Dudley A. White	R	OH-13	January 3, 1937	2nd term	Left the House in 1941.
306	Beverly M. Vincent	D	KY-02	March 2, 1937	2nd term	
307	Lyndon B. Johnson	D	TX-10	April 10, 1937	2nd term	
308	Alfred J. Elliott	D	CA-10	May 4, 1937	2nd term	
309	Richard M. Simpson	R	PA-18	May 11, 1937	2nd term	
310	Lawrence J. Connery	D	MA-07	September 28, 1937	2nd term	
311	Bruce Fairchild Barton	R	NY-17	November 2, 1937	2nd term	Left the House in 1941.
312	Ralph A. Gamble	R	NY-25	November 2, 1937	2nd term	
313	Lewis K. Rockefeller	R	NY-27	November 2, 1937	2nd term	
314	Dave E. Satterfield Jr.	D	VA-03	November 2, 1937	2nd term	
315	Thomas A. Flaherty	D	MA-11	December 14, 1937	2nd term	
316	Joe B. Bates	D	KY-08	June 4, 1938	2nd term	
317	George M. Grant	D	AL-02	June 14, 1938	2nd term	
318	John G. Alexander	R	MN-03	January 3, 1939	1st term	Left the House in 1941.
319	Herman Carl Andersen	R	MN-07	January 3, 1939	1st term	
320	Jack Z. Anderson	R	CA-08	January 3, 1939	1st term	
321	Homer D. Angell	R	OR-03	January 3, 1939	1st term	
322	Albert E. Austin	R	CT-04	January 3, 1939	1st term	Left the House in 1941.
323	Thomas R. Ball	R	CT-02	January 3, 1939	1st term	Left the House in 1941.
324	James M. Barnes	D	IL-20	January 3, 1939	1st term	
325	Lindley Beckworth	D	TX-03	January 3, 1939	1st term	
326	George H. Bender	R	OH	January 3, 1939	1st term	
327	William W. Blackney	R	MI-06	January 3, 1939; Previous service, 1935–1937.	2nd term*	
328	Stephen Bolles	R	WI-01	January 3, 1939	1st term	
329	Chester C. Bolton	R	OH-22	January 3, 1939; Previous service, 1929–1937.	5th term*	Died on October 29, 1939.
330	Frederick Van Ness Bradley	R	MI-11	January 3, 1939	1st term	
331	Clarence J. Brown	R	OH-07	January 3, 1939	1st term	
332	Joseph R. Bryson	D	SC-04	January 3, 1939	1st term	
333	William O. Burgin	D	NC-08	January 3, 1939	1st term	
334	Joseph W. Byrns Jr.	D	TN-05	January 3, 1939	1st term	Left the House in 1941.
335	William D. Byron	D	MD-06	January 3, 1939	1st term	
336	Pat Cannon	D	FL-04	January 3, 1939	1st term	
337	Robert B. Chiperfield	R	IL-15	January 3, 1939	1st term	
338	Cliff Clevenger	R	OH-05	January 3, 1939	1st term	
339	Robert J. Corbett	R	PA-30	January 3, 1939	1st term	Left the House in 1941.
340	Carl Curtis	R	NE-04	January 3, 1939	1st term	
341	Thomas D'Alesandro Jr.	D	MD-03	January 3, 1939	1st term	
342	Colgate Darden	D	VA-02	January 3, 1939; Previous service, 1933–1937.	3rd term*	
343	George P. Darrow	R	PA-07	January 3, 1939; Previous service, 1915–1937.	12th term*	Left the House in 1941.
344	Carl T. Durham	D	NC-06	January 3, 1939	1st term	
345	Henry Dworshak	R	ID-02	January 3, 1939	1st term	
346	Thomas M. Eaton	R	CA-18	January 3, 1939	1st term	Died on September 16, 1939.
347	Clyde T. Ellis	D	AR-03	January 3, 1939	1st term	
348	Charles H. Elston	R	OH-01	January 3, 1939	1st term	
349	James H. Fay	D	NY-16	January 3, 1939	1st term	Left the House in 1941.
350	Ivor D. Fenton	R	PA-13	January 3, 1939	1st term	
351	Alonzo Dillard Folger	D	NC-05	January 3, 1939	1st term	
352	Leland M. Ford	R	CA-16	January 3, 1939	1st term	
353	Fred C. Gartner	R	PA-05	January 3, 1939	1st term	Left the House in 1941.
354	Ezekiel C. Gathings	D	AR-01	January 3, 1939	1st term	
355	Charles L. Gerlach	R	PA-09	January 3, 1939	1st term	
356	Lee E. Geyer	D	CA-17	January 3, 1939	1st term	
357	W. Benjamin Gibbs	D	GA-08	January 3, 1939	1st term	Died on August 7, 1940.
358	George W. Gillie	R	IN-04	January 3, 1939	1st term	
359	Ed Gossett	D	TX-13	January 3, 1939	1st term	
360	Louis E. Graham	R	PA-26	January 3, 1939	1st term	
361	Robert A. Grant	R	IN-03	January 3, 1939	1st term	
362	Harry W. Griswold	R	WI-03	January 3, 1939	1st term	Died on July 4, 1939.
363	Chester H. Gross	R	PA-22	January 3, 1939	1st term	Left the House in 1941.
364	Albert A. Gore Sr.	D	TN-04	January 3, 1939	1st term	
365	Leonard W. Hall	R	NY-01	January 3, 1939	1st term	
366	Butler B. Hare	D	SC-03	January 3, 1939; Previous service, 1925–1933.	5th term*	
367	Forest Harness	R	IN-05	January 3, 1939	1st term	
368	J. Francis Harter	R	NY-41	January 3, 1939	1st term	Left the House in 1941.
369	Charles Hawks Jr.	R	WI-02	January 3, 1939	1st term	Left the House in 1941.
370	George H. Heinke	R	NE-01	January 3, 1939	1st term	Died on January 2, 1940.
371	William E. Hess	R	OH-02	January 3, 1939; Previous service, 1929–1937.	5th term*	
372	John Carl Hinshaw	R	CA-11	January 3, 1939	1st term	
373	Frank O. Horton	R	WY	January 3, 1939	1st term	Left the House in 1941.
374	Walter S. Jeffries	R	NJ-02	January 3, 1939	1st term	Left the House in 1941.
375	Arthur B. Jenks	R	NH-01	January 3, 1939; Previous service, 1937–1938.	2nd term*	
376	Ben F. Jensen	R	IA-07	January 3, 1939	1st term	
377	Joshua L. Johns	R	WI-08	January 3, 1939	1st term	
378	Anton J. Johnson	R	IL-14	January 3, 1939	1st term	
379	Noble J. Johnson	R	IN-06	January 3, 1939; Previous service, 1925–1931.	4th term*	
380	Robert Franklin Jones	R	OH-04	January 3, 1939	1st term	
381	Robert Kean	R	NJ-12	January 3, 1939	1st term	
382	Frank Bateman Keefe	R	WI-06	January 3, 1939	1st term	
383	Michael J. Kennedy	D	NY-15	January 3, 1939	1st term	
384	Paul J. Kilday	D	TX-20	January 3, 1939	1st term	
385	John C. Kunkel	R	PA-19	January 3, 1939	1st term	
386	Gerald W. Landis	R	IN-07	January 3, 1939	1st term	
387	Earl R. Lewis	R	OH-18	January 3, 1939	1st term	Left the House in 1941.
388	Karl M. LeCompte	R	IA-05	January 3, 1939	1st term	
389	A. F. Maciejewski	D	IL-06	January 3, 1939	1st term	
390	Vito Marcantonio	ALP	NY-20	January 3, 1939; Previous service, 1935–1937.	2nd term*	
391	L. L. Marshall	R	OH	January 3, 1939	1st term	Left the House in 1941.
392	John C. Martin	D	IL	January 3, 1939	1st term	Left the House in 1941.
393	Thomas E. Martin	R	IA-01	January 3, 1939	1st term	
394	Joseph A. McArdle	D	PA-33	January 3, 1939	1st term	
395	John McDowell	R	PA-31	January 3, 1939	1st term	Left the House in 1941.
396	Clarence J. McLeod	R	MI-13	January 3, 1939; Previous service, 1920–1921 and 1923–1927.	4th term**	Left the House in 1941.
397	John L. McMillan	D	SC-06	January 3, 1939	1st term	
398	William J. Miller	R	CT-01	January 3, 1939	1st term	Left the House in 1941.
399	Wilbur Mills	D	AR-02	January 3, 1939	1st term	
400	B. J. Monkiewicz	R	CT	January 3, 1939	1st term	Left the House in 1941.
401	Mike Monroney	D	OK-05	January 3, 1939	1st term	
402	Karl E. Mundt	R	SD-01	January 3, 1939	1st term	
403	Reid F. Murray	R	WI-07	January 3, 1939	1st term	
404	Francis J. Myers	D	PA-06	January 3, 1939	1st term	
405	William F. Norrell	D	AR-06	January 3, 1939	1st term	
406	Joseph J. O'Brien	R	NY-38	January 3, 1939	1st term	
407	Frank C. Osmers Jr.	R	NJ-09	January 3, 1939	1st term	
408	Wallace E. Pierce	R	NY-31	January 3, 1939	1st term	Died on January 3, 1940.
409	William Alvin Pittenger	R	MN-08	January 3, 1939; Previous service, 1929–1933 and 1935–1937.	4th term**	
410	Charles Risk	R	RI-01	January 3, 1939; Previous service, 1935–1937.	2nd term*	Left the House in 1941.
411	Robert L. Rodgers	R	PA-29	January 3, 1939	1st term	
412	Harry N. Routzohn	R	OH-03	January 3, 1939	1st term	Left the House in 1941.
413	Harry Sandager	R	RI-02	January 3, 1939	1st term	Left the House in 1941.
414	John C. Schafer	R	WI-04	January 3, 1939; Previous service, 1923–1933.	6th term*	Left the House in 1941.
415	A. C. Schiffler	R	WV-01	January 3, 1939	1st term	Left the House in 1941.
416	Pius L. Schwert	D	NY-42	January 3, 1939	1st term	
417	James Seccombe	R	OH-16	January 3, 1939	1st term	Left the House in 1941.
418	Frederick Cleveland Smith	R	OH-08	January 3, 1939	1st term	
419	Thomas Vernor Smith	D	IL	January 3, 1939	1st term	Left the House in 1941.
420	Raymond S. Springer	R	IN-10	January 3, 1939	1st term	
421	Foster Waterman Stearns	R	NH-02	January 3, 1939	1st term	
422	Jessie Sumner	R	IL-18	January 3, 1939	1st term	
423	Henry O. Talle	R	IA-04	January 3, 1939	1st term	
424	Rudolph G. Tenerowicz	D	MI-01	January 3, 1939	1st term	
425	Lewis D. Thill	R	WI-05	January 3, 1939	1st term	
426	Harve Tibbott	R	PA-27	January 3, 1939	1st term	
427	Jacob Thorkelson	R	MT-01	January 3, 1939	1st term	Left the House in 1941.
428	John Martin Vorys	R	OH-12	January 3, 1939	1st term	
429	Albert L. Vreeland	R	NJ-11	January 3, 1939	1st term	
430	William H. Wheat	R	IL-19	January 3, 1939	1st term	
431	George S. Williams	R	DE	January 3, 1939	1st term	Left the House in 1941.
432	Thomas Daniel Winter	R	KS-03	January 3, 1939	1st term	
433	James E. Van Zandt	R	PA-23	January 3, 1939	1st term	
434	Oscar Youngdahl	R	MN-05	January 3, 1939	1st term	
	Lansdale Ghiselin Sasscer	D	MD-05	February 3, 1939	1st term	
	W. Wirt Courtney	D	TN-06	May 11, 1939	1st term	
	David Jenkins Ward	D	MD-01	June 8, 1939	1st term	
	Albert Sidney Camp	D	GA-04	August 1, 1939	1st term	
	William Fadjo Cravens	D	AR-04	September 12, 1939	1st term	
	Estes Kefauver	D	TN-03	September 13, 1939	1st term	
	Edwin Arthur Hall	R	NY-34	November 7, 1939	1st term	
	Clara G. McMillan	D	SC-01	November 7, 1939	1st term	Left the House in 1941.
	John E. Sheridan	D	PA-04	November 7, 1939	1st term	
	John Jennings	R	TN-02	December 30, 1939	1st term	
	Morris Michael Edelstein	D	NY-14	February 6, 1940	1st term	
	Clarence E. Kilburn	R	NY-31	February 13, 1940	1st term	
	Clifford Davis	D	TN-10	February 14, 1940	1st term	
	Bartel J. Jonkman	R	MI-05	February 19, 1940	1st term	
	Walter A. Lynch	D	NY-22	February 20, 1940	1st term	
	Frances P. Bolton	R	OH-22	February 27, 1940	1st term	
	J. Harry McGregor	R	OH-17	February 27, 1940	1st term	
	Robert K. Goodwin	R	IA-06	March 5, 1940	1st term	Left the House in 1941.
	John Hyde Sweet	R	NE-01	April 19, 1940	1st term	Left the House in 1941.
	Margaret Chase Smith	R	ME-02	June 3, 1940	1st term	
	Florence Reville Gibbs	D	GA-08	October 1, 1940	1st term	Left the House in 1941.
	Herbert Covington Bonner	D	NC-01	November 5, 1940	1st term	
	William E. Burney	D	CO-03	November 5, 1940	1st term	Left the House in 1941.
	Zadoc L. Weatherford	D	AL-07	November 5, 1940	1st term	Left the House in 1941.

== Delegates ==
Rank	Delegate	Party	District	Seniority date (Previous service, if any)	No.# of term(s)	Notes
1	Anthony Dimond	D	AK	March 4, 1933	4th term	
2	Santiago Iglesias	Coalitionist	PR	March 4, 1933	4th term	
3	Samuel Wilder King	R	HI	January 3, 1935	3rd term	
4	Joaquin Miguel Elizalde	Lib	PHL	September 29, 1938	2nd term	
5	Bolívar Pagán	Socialist	PR	December 26, 1939	1st term	

== See also ==
- 76th United States Congress
- List of United States congressional districts
- List of United States senators in the 76th Congress
