= De Alva S. Alexander =

American politician (1846–1925)

De Alva Stanwood Alexander
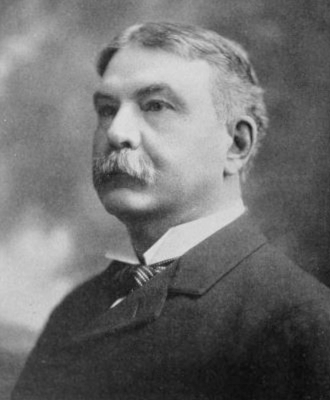

Member of the U.S. House of Representatives from New York
- In office March 4, 1897 – March 3, 1911
- Preceded by: Charles Daniels
- Succeeded by: Charles B. Smith
- Constituency: 33rd district (1897–1903); 36th district (1903–11)

Personal details
- Born: July 17, 1846 Richmond, Maine, U.S.
- Died: January 30, 1925 (aged 78) Buffalo, New York, U.S.
- Citizenship: United States
- Party: Republican
- Spouse: Alice Colby Alexander Anne Gerlach Bliss Alexander
- Education: Bowdoin College
- Profession: Attorney, historian, journalist, politician

Military service
- Allegiance: United States
- Branch/service: United States Army
- Years of service: 1862–1865
- Rank: Private
- Unit: One Hundred and Twenty-eighth Regiment, Ohio Volunteer Infantry
- Battles/wars: American Civil War

De Alva Stanwood Alexander (July 17, 1846 – January 30, 1925) was an American journalist, lawyer, historian, and member of the United States House of Representatives, serving seven terms from 1897 to 1911 as a representative of New York state.

== Early years ==
Alexander was born in Richmond, Maine, on July 17, 1846, the son of Stanwood and Priscilla (Brown) Alexander, grandson of Campbell and Margaret (Stanwood) Alexander, and a descendant on his mother's side of George Brown, who came from England to Plymouth in 1635. He attended the common schools and moved with his mother to Ohio in 1859. He serving as Private in Union Army from 1862 until the end the American Civil War, enlisted in the One Hundred and Twenty-eighth Regiment, Ohio Volunteer Infantry. After the war, he attended Edward Little Institute at Auburn, Maine, to prepare for college, and then attended Bowdoin College at Brunswick, Maine, and graduated in 1870. He served many years as a member and president of the Bowdoin College board of overseers.

== Career ==
When Alexander moved to Fort Wayne, Indiana in 1870, he was one of the editors and proprietors of the Daily Gazette from 1871 to 1874, and a delegate to the Republican National Convention at Philadelphia in 1872. He married Alice Colby on September 21, 1871.

Alexander then moved to Indianapolis, in 1874, where he was a correspondent for the Cincinnati Gazette. He was secretary of the Indiana Republican State committee from 1874 to 1878. While he was in Indianapolis, Alexander met and formed a friendship with U.S. Senator Benjamin Harrison. He studied law and was admitted to the bar in Indiana in 1877, and went into private practice in partnership with the Hon. Stanton J. Peele until 1881, when he was appointed Fifth Auditor of the Treasury Department, serving until 1885.

He was commander of the Department of the Potomac, Grand Army of the Republic, for one term. He then removed to Buffalo, New York, in 1885, and formed a law partnership with the Hon. James A. Roberts. After Harrison was elected President of the United States in 1888, he appointed Alexander as United States Attorney for the Northern District of New York in May 1889, a position Alexander held until his resignation in December 1893. He married Anne Gerlach Bliss on December 28, 1893, and resumed his law practice.

In 1896, Alexander was elected as a Republican to the 55th Congress as a United States representative for New York's thirty-third district, where he served seven terms. In his last term (sixty-first Congress) he was Chairman of House Committee on Rivers and Harbors. After serving from March 4, 1897, to March 3, 1911. He was defeated by Charles Bennett Smith when he ran for re-election in 1910 — Smith won by one vote.

While still serving in Congress, Alexander began work on Political History of the State of New York, a four-volume work finally completed in 1923. It focused on prominent political leaders such as Grover Cleveland, Thomas C. Platt, and Theodore Roosevelt. He also wrote History and Procedure of the House of Representatives (1916).

Alexander died on January 30, 1925, in Buffalo, New York; and was buried at the Forest Lawn Cemetery there.

Legal offices
Preceded by Daniel N. Lockwood	U.S. Attorney for the Northern District of New York; 1889–1893	Succeeded by William A. Poucher
U.S. House of Representatives
Preceded by Charles Daniels	Member of the U.S. House of Representatives from New York's 33rd congressional district 1897–1903	Succeeded by Charles W. Gillet
New district	Member of the U.S. House of Representatives from New York's 36th congressional district 1903–1911	Succeeded by Charles Bennett Smith
