= List of United States senators in the 76th Congress =

This is a complete list of United States senators during the 76th United States Congress listed by seniority from January 3, 1939, to January 3, 1941.

Order of service is based on the commencement of the senator's first term. Behind this is former service as a senator (only giving the senator seniority within their new incoming class), service as vice president, a House member, a cabinet secretary, or a governor of a state. The final factor is the population of the senator's state.

Senators who were sworn in during the middle of the Congress (up until the last senator who was not sworn in early after winning the November 1940 election) are listed at the end of the list with no number.

In this Congress, the most senior junior senator was Gerald Nye. The distinction of most junior senior senator was held by three different individuals: William Smathers from the start of the 76th Congress until April 9, 1939; Scott Lucas from April 9, 1939 to January 19, 1940; and D. Worth Clark from January 19, 1940 to the end of the 76th Congress.

== Terms of service ==
Class	Terms of service of senators that expired in years
Class 1	Terms of service of senators that expired in 1941 (AZ, CA, CT, DE, FL, IN, MA, MD, ME, MI, MN, MO, MS, MT, ND, NE, NJ, NM, NV, NY, OH, PA, RI, TN, TX, UT, VA, VT, WA, WI, WV, and WY.)
Class 2	Terms of service of senators that expired in 1943 (AL, AR, CO, DE, GA, IA, ID, IL, KS, KY, LA, MA, ME, MI, MN, MS, MT, NC, NE, NH, NJ, NM, OK, OR, RI, SC, SD, TN, TX, VA, WV, and WY.)
Class 3	Terms of service of senators that expired in 1945 (AL, AR, AZ, CA, CO, CT, FL, GA, ID, IL, IN, IA, KS, KY, LA, MD, MO, NC, ND, NH, NV, NY, OH, OK, OR, PA, SC, SD, UT, VT, WA, and WI.)

== U.S. Senate seniority list ==
U.S. Senate seniority
Rank	Senator (party-state)	Seniority date	Other factors
1	William Borah (R-ID)	March 4, 1907	
2	Ellison D. Smith (D-SC)	March 4, 1909	
3	Henry F. Ashurst (D-AZ)	April 2, 1912	
4	Key Pittman (D-NV)	January 29, 1913	
5	Morris Sheppard (D-TX)	February 3, 1913	
6	George W. Norris (I-NE)	March 4, 1913	
7	Kenneth McKellar (D-TN)	March 4, 1917	Former representative (6 years)
8	William H. King (D-UT)	March 4, 1917	Former representative (3 years)
9	Frederick Hale (R-ME)	March 4, 1917	
10	Hiram Johnson (R-CA)	March 16, 1917	
11	Charles L. McNary (R-OR)	December 18, 1918	
12	Arthur Capper (R-KS)	March 4, 1919	
13	Pat Harrison (D-MS)	March 5, 1919	
14	Carter Glass (D-VA)	February 2, 1920	
15	Walter F. George (D-GA)	November 22, 1922	
16	Lynn Frazier (R-ND)	March 4, 1923	Former governor
17	Henrik Shipstead (FL-MN)	March 4, 1923	Minnesota 17th in population (1920)
18	Burton K. Wheeler (D-MT)	March 4, 1923	Montana 39th in population (1920)
19	Robert M. La Follette Jr. (WP-WI)	September 30, 1925	
20	Gerald Nye (R-ND)	November 14, 1925	
21	David I. Walsh (D-MA)	December 6, 1926	
22	Carl Hayden (D-AZ)	March 4, 1927	Former representative (15 years)
23	Alben W. Barkley (D-KY)	March 4, 1927	Former representative (14 years)
24	Elmer Thomas (D-OK)	March 4, 1927	Former representative, Oklahoma 21st in population (1920)
25	Millard Tydings (D-MD)	March 4, 1927	Former representative, Maryland 28th in population (1920)
26	Robert F. Wagner (D-NY)	March 4, 1927	
27	Arthur H. Vandenberg (R-MI)	March 31, 1928	
28	Tom Connally (D-TX)	March 4, 1929	Former representative
29	John G. Townsend Jr. (R-DE)	March 4, 1929	
30	James J. Davis (R-PA)	December 2, 1930	
31	Matthew M. Neely (D-WV)	March 4, 1931	Previously a senator (6 years), former representative (8 years)
32	J. Hamilton Lewis (D-IL)	March 4, 1931	Previously a senator (6 years), former representative (2 years)
33	James F. Byrnes (D-SC)	March 4, 1931	Former representative (14 years), South Carolina 26th in population (1930)
34	Wallace H. White Jr. (R-ME)	March 4, 1931	Former representative (14 years), Maine 35th in population (1930)
35	William J. Bulow (D-SD)	March 4, 1931	Former governor
36	Josiah W. Bailey (D-NC)	March 4, 1931	North Carolina 12th in population (1930)
37	John H. Bankhead II (D-AL)	March 4, 1931	Alabama 15th in population (1930)
38	Marvel M. Logan (D-KY)	March 4, 1931	Kentucky 17th in population (1930)
39	Warren Austin (R-VT)	April 1, 1931	
40	Hattie Caraway (D-AR)	November 13, 1931	
41	Robert R. Reynolds (D-NC)	December 5, 1932	
42	Richard Russell Jr. (D-GA)	January 12, 1933	
43	Bennett Champ Clark (D-MO)	February 4, 1933	
44	Alva B. Adams (D-CO)	March 4, 1933	Previously a senator
45	John H. Overton (D-LA)	March 4, 1933	Former representative
46	Harry F. Byrd Sr. (D-VA)	March 4, 1933	Former governor
47	Frederick Van Nuys (D-IN)	March 4, 1933	Indiana 11th in population (1930)
48	Homer T. Bone (D-WA)	March 4, 1933	Washington 30th in population (1930)
49	Elbert D. Thomas (D-UT)	March 4, 1933	Utah 40th in population (1930)
50	Pat McCarran (D-NV)	March 4, 1933	Nevada 48th in population (1930)
51	Carl Hatch (D-NM)	October 10, 1933	
52	Ernest W. Gibson (R-VT)	November 21, 1933	
53	Joseph C. O'Mahoney (D-WY)	January 1, 1934	
54	James Murray (D-MT)	November 7, 1934	
55	Peter G. Gerry (D-RI)	January 3, 1935	Previously a senator
56	Francis T. Maloney (D-CT)	January 3, 1935	Former representative (2 years), Connecticut 29th in population (1930)
57	Edward R. Burke (D-NE)	January 3, 1935	Former representative (2 years), Nebraska 32nd in population (1930)
58	Theodore G. Bilbo (D-MS)	January 3, 1935	Former governor (8 years)
59	Vic Donahey (D-OH)	January 3, 1935	Former governor (6 years)
60	Joseph F. Guffey (D-PA)	January 3, 1935	Pennsylvania 2nd in population (1930)
61	Harry S. Truman (D-MO)	January 3, 1935	Missouri 10th in population (1930)
62	Sherman Minton (D-IN)	January 3, 1935	Indiana 11th in population (1930)
63	George L. P. Radcliffe (D-MD)	January 3, 1935	Maryland 28th in population (1930)
64	Lewis B. Schwellenbach (D-WA)	January 3, 1935	Washington 30th in population (1930)
65	Dennis Chavez (D-NM)	May 11, 1935	
66	Rush D. Holt (D-WV)	June 21, 1935	
67	Guy Mark Gillette (D-IA)	November 4, 1936	Former representative
68	Charles O. Andrews (D-FL)	November 4, 1936	"A" 1st in alphabet
69	Claude Pepper (D-FL)	November 4, 1936	"P" 16th in alphabet
70	Prentiss M. Brown (D-MI)	November 19, 1936	
71	Ernest Lundeen (FL-MN)	January 3, 1937	Former representative (6 years)
72	Joshua B. Lee (D-OK)	January 3, 1937	Former representative (2 years)
73	Clyde L. Herring (D-IA)	January 3, 1937	Former governor (4 years), Iowa 19th in population (1930)
74	Edwin C. Johnson (D-CO)	January 3, 1937	Former governor (4 years), Colorado 33rd in population (1930)
75	Theodore F. Green (D-RI)	January 3, 1937	Former governor (4 years), Rhode Island 37th in population (1930)
76	Styles Bridges (R-NH)	January 3, 1937	Former governor (2 years)
77	Henry Cabot Lodge Jr. (R-MA)	January 3, 1937	Massachusetts 8th in population (1930)
78	Allen J. Ellender (D-LA)	January 3, 1937	Louisiana 22nd in population (1930)
79	James H. Hughes (D-DE)	January 3, 1937	Delaware 46th in population (1930)
80	Henry H. Schwartz (D-WY)	January 3, 1937	Wyoming 47th in population (1930)
81	William H. Smathers (D-NJ)	April 15, 1937	
82	John E. Miller (D-AR)	November 15, 1937	
83	Joseph L. Hill (D-AL)	January 11, 1938	
84	William Warren Barbour (R-NJ)	November 9, 1938	
85	Tom Stewart (D-TN)	November 9, 1938	
86	James M. Mead (D-NY)	December 3, 1938	
87	Charles W. Tobey (R-NH)	January 3, 1939	Former representative (6 years)
88	Scott W. Lucas (D-IL)	January 3, 1939	Former representative (4 years), Illinois 3rd in population (1930)
89	D. Worth Clark (D-ID)	January 3, 1939	Former representative (4 years), Idaho 42nd in population (1930)
90	Clyde M. Reed (R-KS)	January 3, 1939	Former governor
91	Robert A. Taft (R-OH)	January 3, 1939	Ohio 4th in population (1930)
92	Sheridan Downey (D-CA)	January 3, 1939	California 6th in population (1930)
93	John A. Danaher (R-CT)	January 3, 1939	Connecticut 29th in population (1930)
94	Alexander Wiley (R-WI)	January 3, 1939	Wisconsin 30th in population (1930)
95	Rufus C. Holman (R-OR)	January 3, 1939	Oregon 34th in population (1930)
96	John Chandler Gurney (R-SD)	January 3, 1939	South Dakota 36th in population (1930)
	James M. Slattery (D-IL)	April 14, 1939	
	Albert B. Chandler (D-KY)	October 9, 1939	
	John Thomas (R-ID)	January 27, 1940	
	Ernest W. Gibson Jr. (R-VT)	June 24, 1940	
	Joseph H. Ball (R-MN)	October 14, 1940	
	C. Wayland Brooks (R-IL)	November 22, 1940	
	Berkeley L. Bunker (D-NV)	November 27, 1940	
	Monrad C. Wallgren (D-WA)	December 19, 1940	

The senior senators by class were Henry F. Ashurst (R-Arizona) from Class 1, William Borah (R-Idaho) from Class 2, and Ellison D. Smith (D-South Carolina) from Class 3. Borah died on January 19, 1940 with Morris Sheppard (D-Texas) became the senior senator from his class.

== See also ==
- 76th United States Congress
- List of United States representatives in the 76th Congress
