= George B. Kelly =

American politician

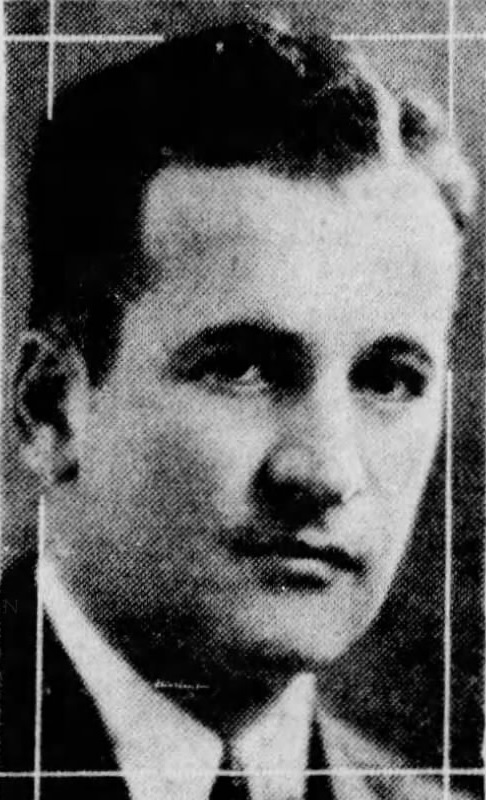
- Kelly in 1933

Member of the U.S. House of Representatives from New York's 38th district
- In office January 3, 1937 – January 3, 1939
- Preceded by: James P.B. Duffy
- Succeeded by: Joseph J. O'Brien

Personal details
- Born: December 12, 1900 Waterloo, New York, U.S.
- Died: June 26, 1971 (aged 70) Lyon, France
- Party: Democratic
- Spouse: Catherine Weber (m. 1936)
- Children: 1
- Parents: James P. Kelly (father); Charlotte Bradshaw (mother)
- Occupation: Labor manager; politician

George Bradshaw Kelly (December 12, 1900 – June 26, 1971) was an American politician from New York. He served one term in the United States House of Representatives from 1937 to 1939.

== Life ==
Kelly was born on December 12, 1900, in Waterloo, Seneca County, New York, the son of James P. and Charlotte Bradshaw Kelly. He studied at ST. Mary's School in Waterloo, Saints Peter and Paul School, and West High School in Rochester, and took extension classes at the University of Rochester. After working at General Railroad Signal, the Ritter dental Company and Pfauldler Co, in 1920 he went to work for Fashion Park, Inc. a men's clothing company in Rochester, where he became labor manager.

=== Political career ===
In 1932, he became the first Democrat to win a seat in the New York state Assembly from Monroe County, NY in more than forty years.

He was a member of the New York State Assembly (Monroe Co., 2nd D.) in 1933 and 1934; and a member of the New York State Senate (45th D.) in 1935 and 1936. In 1936, he defeated the incumbent member of Congress, James P. B. Duffy, in a Democratic primary. His successful campaign in the primary was a defeat for the Democratic organization of Monroe County and was powered by strong support by labor unions, and in particular the Amalgamated Clothing Workers. The District consisted of almost all of the City of Rochester and the Towns of Greece, Irondequoit, Webster, Penfield, Brighton, Perinton, Pittsford, Rush and Henrietta.

Kelly did particularly well in the 1936 primary in the north east section of Rochester, in the 8th and 16th Wards, home of Rochester's Italian community and clothing industry. As a later political analysis put it, "Kelly, who is as Irish as his name, learned Italian as a young man, and he'd the first to tell you that his knowledge of the language didn't hurt him a bit in the early and mid-1930s when he was elected to the State Assembly, then the state Senate, and finally Congress. He always had strong support from the so-called 'industrial wards' on the east side of Rochester, heavily populated by Italian clothing workers."

=== Congress ===
He was elected as a Democrat to the 75th United States Congress, holding office from January 3, 1937, to January 3, 1939. He ran for re-election in 1938 and 1940, but was twice defeated by Republican Joseph J. O'Brien.

=== Family ===
On December 10, 1936, he married Catherine Weber, a secretary in the Democratic party headquarters. They had one son, James Kelly.

=== Death ===
Kelly died on June 26, 1971, while on a European vacation in Lyon, France.

Political offices
Preceded by Harry J. McKay	New York State Assembly; Monroe County, 2nd District; 1933–1934	Succeeded by Joseph DiFede
Preceded by Cosmo A. Cilano	New York State Senate; 45th District; 1935–1936	Succeeded by Emmett L. Doyle
U.S. House of Representatives
Preceded by James P. B. Duffy	Member of the U.S. House of Representatives from New York's 38th congressional district 1937–1939	Succeeded by Joseph J. O'Brien
