= James L. Whitley =

American politician

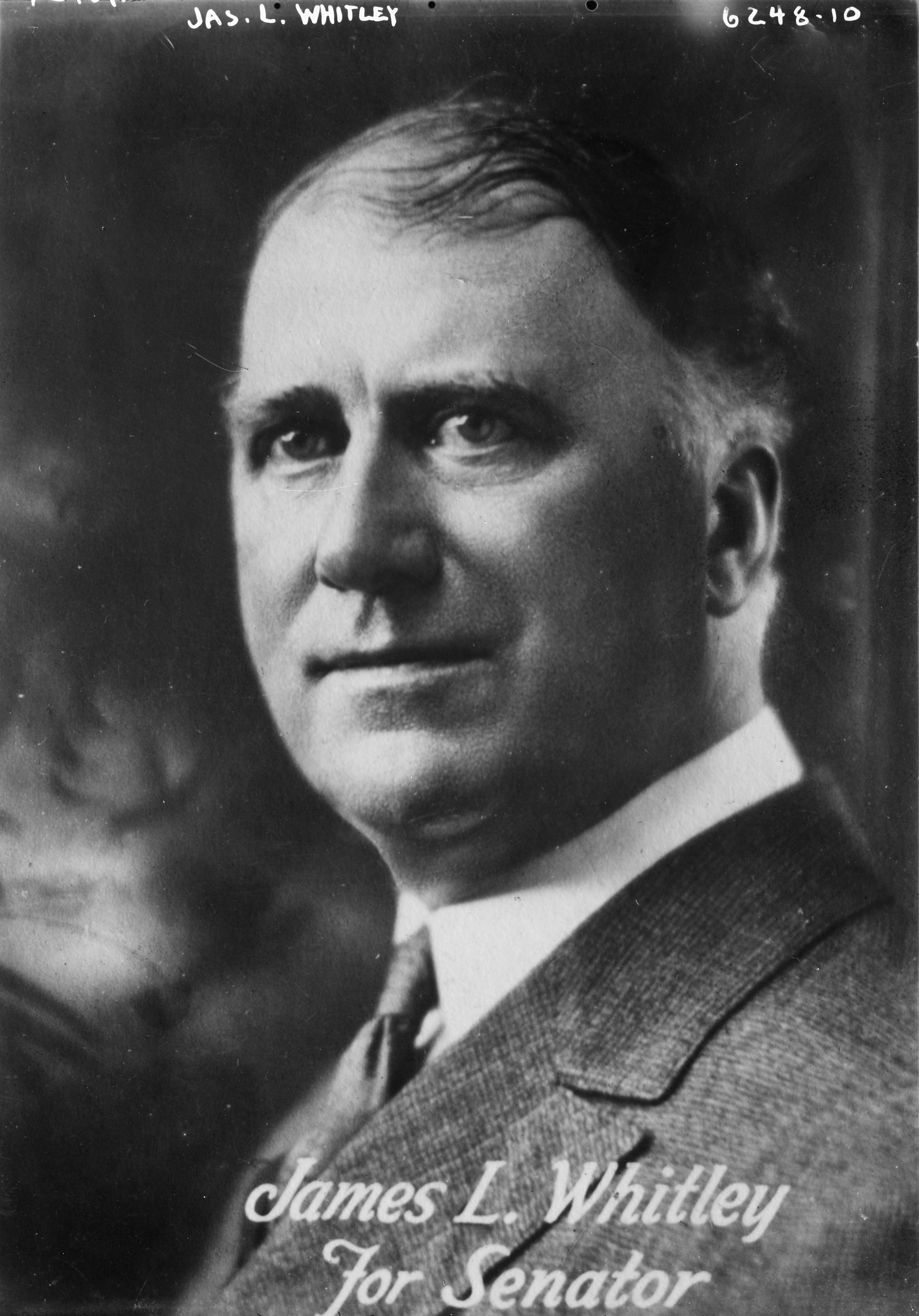

Member of the U.S. House of Representatives from New York's 38th district
- In office March 4, 1929 – January 3, 1935
- Preceded by: Meyer Jacobstein
- Succeeded by: James P.B. Duffy

Personal details
- Born: May 24, 1872 Rochester, New York, US
- Died: May 17, 1959 (aged 86) Rochester, New York, US
- Party: Republican

James Lucius Whitley (May 24, 1872 – May 17, 1959) was an American politician from New York.

== Life ==
Whitley was born in Rochester, New York. He graduated from the law department of Union College in 1898. He served as a sergeant in the Spanish–American War.

He was a member of the New York State Assembly (Monroe Co., 2nd D.) in 1906, 1907, 1908, 1909 and 1910.

He was a member of the New York State Senate (45th D.) from 1919 to 1928, sitting in the 142nd, 143rd, 144th, 145th, 146th, 147th, 148th, 149th, 150th and 151st New York State Legislatures.

He was elected as a Republican to the 71st, 72nd and 73rd United States Congress, holding office from March 4, 1929, to January 3, 1935.

He died on May 17, 1959, in Rochester, New York. He was buried at Mount Hope Cemetery.

New York State Assembly
Preceded by Charles E. Ogden	New York State Assembly; Monroe County, 2nd District; 1906–1910	Succeeded by Simon L. Adler
New York State Senate
Preceded by George F. Argetsinger	New York State Senate; 45th District; 1919–1928	Succeeded by Cosmo A. Cilano
U.S. House of Representatives
Preceded by Meyer Jacobstein	Member of the U.S. House of Representatives from New York's 38th congressional district 1929–1935	Succeeded by James P. B. Duffy
