= Alfred F. Beiter =

American politician (1894-1974)

Alfred Beiter
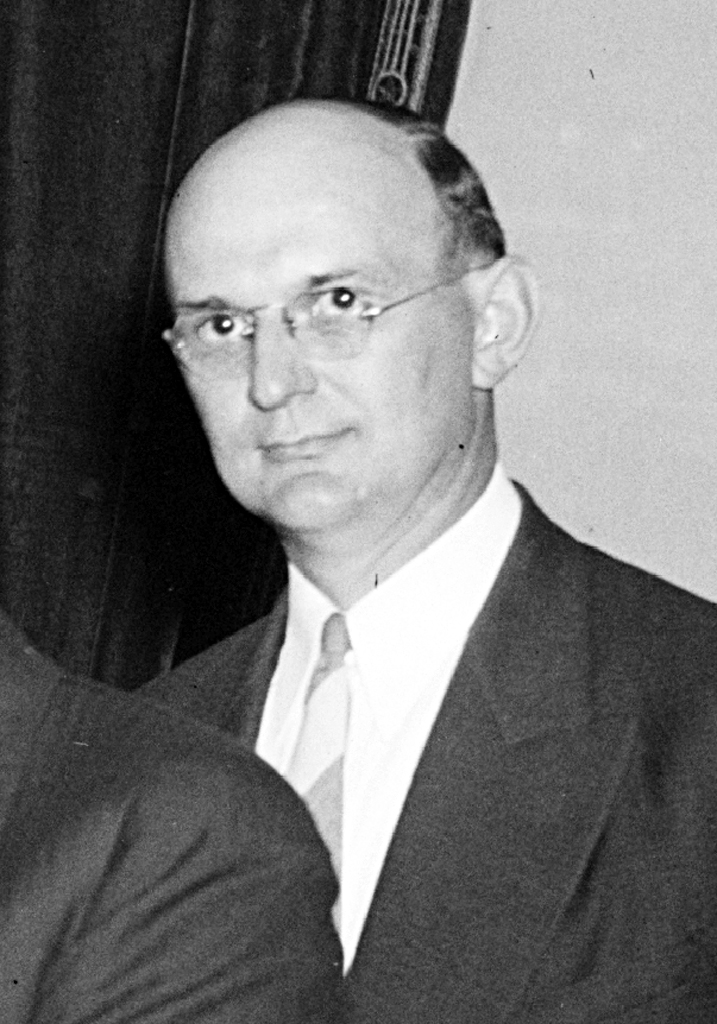

Member of the U.S. House of Representatives from New York's 41st district
- In office January 3, 1941 – January 3, 1943
- Preceded by: J. Francis Harter
- Succeeded by: Joseph Mruk
- In office March 4, 1933 – January 3, 1939
- Preceded by: Edmund F. Cooke
- Succeeded by: J. Francis Harter

Personal details
- Born: Alfred Florian Beiter; July 7, 1894 Clarence, New York, U.S.
- Died: March 11, 1974 (aged 79) Boca Raton, Florida, U.S.
- Resting place: Boca Raton Cemetery
- Party: Democratic
- Spouse: Caroline A. Kibler Beiter
- Education: Niagara University
- Profession: merchant; politician

Alfred Florian Beiter (July 7, 1894 – March 11, 1974) was an American businessman and politician who served four terms as a United States representative from New York from 1933 to 1939 and from 1941 to 1943. He was a Democrat.

== Biography ==
Beiter was born the son of Nicholas I and Elizabeth E Wyman Beiter in Clarence, New York. He attended Williamsville High School and Niagara University. He married Caroline A. Kibler on November 19, 1919.

== Career ==
After a move to Williamsville, New York, Beiter engaged in the general merchandising business from 1915 to 1929. He was a supervisor of the town of Amherst, New York, from 1930 to 1934.

=== Congress ===
Elected as a Democrat to the Seventy-third and the two succeeding Congresses, Beiter was U. S. Representative for the forty-first district of New York from March 4, 1933, to January 3, 1939; and was chairman of the Committee on War Claims during the Seventy-fifth Congress. An unsuccessful candidate for reelection in 1938 to the Seventy-sixth Congress, he was assistant to the United States Secretary of the Interior in 1939 and 1940. He was then elected to the Seventy-seventh Congress and served from January 3, 1941, to January 3, 1943, but was an unsuccessful candidate for reelection in 1942 to the Seventy-eighth Congress.

=== Later career ===
Beiter owned and operated a hatchery and feed business in Buffalo, New York, from 1944 to 1948, and was president of the National Customs Service Association from 1949 to 1961. He finished his career as Deputy Commissioner of Customs for the Treasury Department in Washington, D.C., from 1961 to 1964. He resided in Chevy Chase, Maryland. He moved to Boca Raton, Florida, upon his retirement.

U.S. House of Representatives
Preceded by Edmund F. Cooke	Member of the U.S. House of Representatives from New York's 41st congressional district March 4, 1933 – January 3, 1939	Succeeded by J. Francis Harter
Preceded by J. Francis Harter	Member of the U.S. House of Representatives from New York's 41st congressional district January 3, 1941 – January 3, 1943	Succeeded by Joseph Mruk
