= Edmund F. Cooke =

American politician (1885–1965)

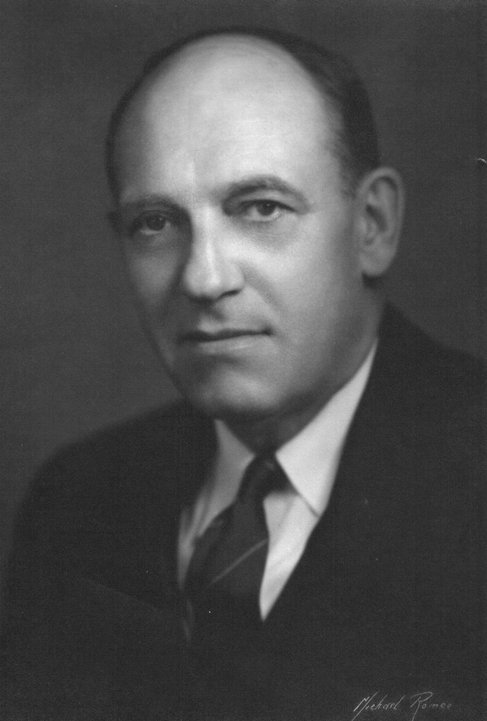

Member of the U.S. House of Representatives from New York's 41st district
- In office March 4, 1929 – March 3, 1933
- Preceded by: Clarence MacGregor
- Succeeded by: Alfred F. Beiter

Member of the New York State Assembly (Erie Co., 7th D.)
- In office 1923 – 1928

Personal details
- Born: April 13, 1885 Prescott, Arizona Territory
- Died: May 13, 1967 (aged 82) Alden, New York
- Party: Republican
- Spouse: Jennie O. Swanson

Edmund Francis Cooke (April 13, 1885 – May 13, 1967) was a Republican member of the United States House of Representatives from New York.

== Early life ==
Cooke was born in Prescott, Arizona, then a small frontier town. In his infancy, the Yavapai Indians were rumored to be preparing an attack on the settlement. Fearing that he might be killed without having been baptized, his mother summoned a neighbor and the two women christened him without benefit of clergy. He moved with his parents to Alden, New York in 1887 where his grandfather lived, and it was there that he gained a first-hand knowledge of dairy farmers' problems and polished his oratorical skills by giving speeches to the corn stalks in the fields.

Cooke studied law in the office of Judge Harold J. Hinman in Albany, was admitted to the bar in 1910, and practiced law in Alden.

== Politics and career ==
During World War I he was Secretary for the YMCA in Europe and laid plans to pursue a political career when he returned home.

He was a member of the New York State Assembly (Erie Co., 7th D.) in 1923, 1924, 1925, 1926, 1927 and 1928.

He was elected as a Republican to the 71st and 72nd United States Congresses, holding office from March 4, 1929, to March 3, 1933. In 1932, he was defeated for re-election by Alfred F. Beiter. Cooke then resumed the practice of law in Buffalo and began his decades of work to improve the lot of dairy farmers in the Northeast Milk Shed.

He was Founder, and for 25 years the General Manager and Counsel for Mutual Federation of Independent Cooperatives, an organization of dairy farmers in the Northeast United States that supplies milk and other dairy products to metropolitan New York.

== Personal life ==
He married Jennie O. Swanson, of Jamestown, in 1908. His children include Eilene, a graduate of the University of Buffalo, John H. Cooke and Richard T. Cooke, both graduates of Washington and Lee University, and the University at Buffalo Law School. His last child, Cynthia G. Cooke, graduated from the University of Arizona and Arizona State University, and lived in Scottsdale, Arizona.

Edmund Cooke became an adopted member of the Tuscarora Tribe because of his contribution to the welfare of Native Americans. He was an avid hunter and fisherman. He died in Alden, New York in 1967.

== Sources ==
- United States Congress. "Edmund F. Cooke (id: C000730)". Biographical Directory of the United States Congress.

New York State Assembly
Preceded by Herbert A. Zimmerman	New York State Assembly; Erie County, 7th District; 1923–1928	Succeeded by Arthur L. Swartz
U.S. House of Representatives
Preceded by Clarence MacGregor	Member of the U.S. House of Representatives from New York's 41st congressional district 1929–1933	Succeeded by Alfred F. Beiter
