= Meyer Jacobstein =

American politician

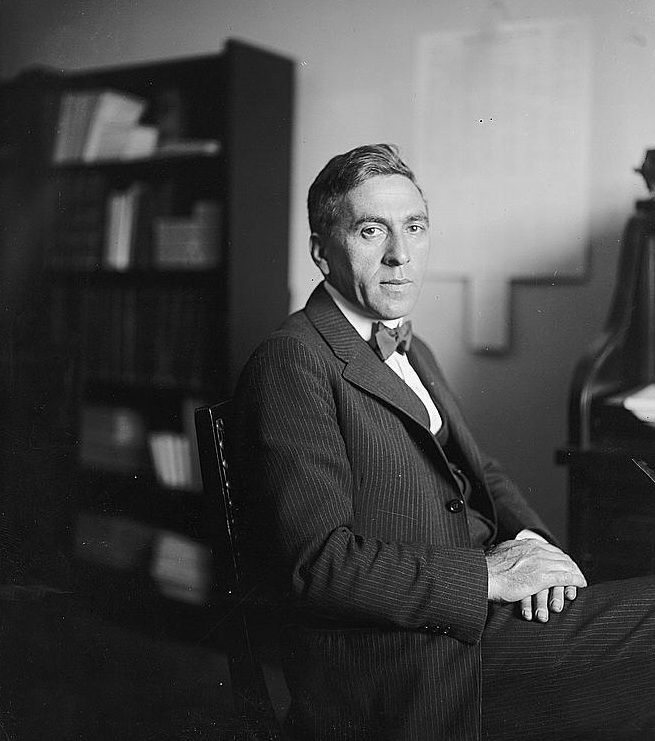

Member of the U.S. House of Representatives from New York's 38th district
- In office March 4, 1923 – March 3, 1929
- Preceded by: Thomas B. Dunn
- Succeeded by: James L. Whitley

Personal details
- Born: January 25, 1880 Manhattan, New York, U.S.
- Died: April 18, 1963 (aged 83) Rochester, New York, U.S.
- Resting place: Mount Hope Cemetery
- Party: Democratic
- Education: University of Rochester; Columbia University

Meyer Jacobstein (January 25, 1880 – April 18, 1963) was an American educator and politician who served three terms as a member of the United States House of Representatives from New York from 1923 to 1929.

== Early life ==
According to family archives, Meyer was born on Henry Street on the Lower East Side of Manhattan to Polish Jews who had only weeks earlier immigrated to New York via Stockholm, Sweden. In 1881, the family moved to Syracuse, New York, and then relocated to Rochester, New York, one year later. Coming from a family of tailors, he worked for less than a week in a Rochester tailor shop before deciding to attend high school instead.

== Academic career ==
After attending public schools in Rochester, New York, he attended the University of Rochester and graduated from Columbia University in 1904. Jacobstein pursued postgraduate courses at the same university in economics and political science and became a special agent in the Bureau of Corporations and Department of Commerce in Washington, D.C., in 1907. Between 1909 and 1913, he worked as an assistant professor of economics at the University of North Dakota at Grand Forks and, one year later, became professor of economics in the University of Rochester. Jacobstein was a director in emergency employment management at the University of Rochester under the auspices of the War Industry Board from 1916 to 1918.

Writing in 1912 about the Aldrich plan for a National Reserve Association, Meyer Jacobstein, assistant professor of economics at the University of North Dakota, encouraged North Dakota's bankers, however unsuccessfully, to leave their rural prejudices behind and consider the greater good of the entire banking industry:

The average country banker is always more or less suspicious of the city banker. As the Aldrich bill bears the name of an unpopular easterner, who is generally believed to be working in the interest of a group of eastern capitalists, it is not unnatural that North Dakota bankers should approach this proposed legislation with considerable timidity and suspicion. It will be well for the rural banker, however, to dispossess himself of this native prejudice and withhold judgment until he has made a careful and conscientious examination of the bill.

== Political Service ==
He was elected as a Democrat to the Sixty-eighth, Sixty-ninth, and Seventieth Congresses (March 4, 1923 – March 3, 1929) yet was not a candidate for renomination in 1928. He served as a delegate to the Democratic National Conventions in 1924 and 1932 but declined the nomination of mayor of Rochester, N.Y., in 1925. His political career is notable for his staunch opposition to the Immigration Act of 1924.

Nothing is more un-American. Nothing could be more dangerous, in a land the Constitution of which says that all men are created equal, than to write into our law a theory which puts one race above another, which stamps one group of people as superior and another as inferior. The fact that it is camouflaged in a maze of statistics will not protect this Nation from the evil consequences of such an unscientific, un-American, wicked philosophy.

== After Politics ==
Jacobstein engaged in banking in Rochester, N.Y., from 1929 to 1936 and in 1936 became chairman of the board of the Rochester Business Institute. He was a member of the Brookings Institution staff from 1939 to 1946 and economic counsel in the legislative reference service of the Library of Congress from 1947 until his retirement May 31, 1952.

== Death and burial ==
Jacobstein resided in Rochester, N.Y., until his death there on April 18, 1963, and was laid to rest at Mount Hope Cemetery.

== See also ==
- List of Jewish members of the United States Congress

== Sources ==
- Biographical Directory of the United States Congress
- Federal Reserve Bank of Minneapolis
- Rose Jacobstein (sister), Jacobstein Family History [unpublished family archive], after 1946.

U.S. House of Representatives
Preceded by Thomas B. Dunn	Member of the U.S. House of Representatives from New York's 38th congressional district 1923–1929	Succeeded by James L. Whitley
