= Norman J. Gould =

American politician and businessman (1877–1964)

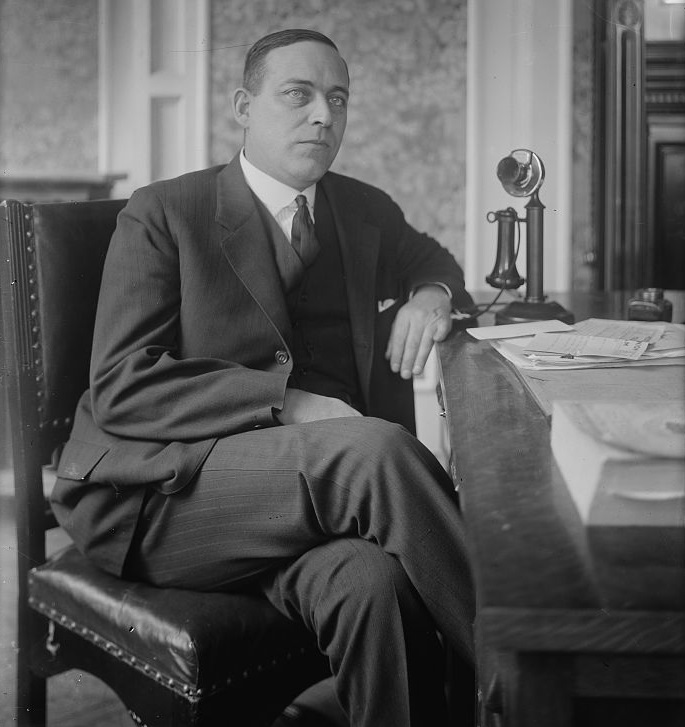
- Portrait of Gould by George Grantham Bain, 1920

Member of the U.S. House of Representatives from New York's 36th district
- In office November 2, 1915 – March 3, 1923
- Preceded by: Sereno E. Payne
- Succeeded by: John Taber

Personal details
- Born: Norman Judd Gould; March 15, 1877 Seneca Falls, New York, US
- Died: August 20, 1964 (aged 87) Geneva, New York, US
- Party: Republican
- Relations: Norman B. Judd (grandfather); Richard Mather; Henry Smith
- Occupation: Politician, businessman

Norman Judd Gould (March 15, 1877 – August 20, 1964) was an American politician and businessman. A Republican, he was a member of the United States House of Representatives from New York. Besides politics, he was president of Goulds Pumps, at the time the world's largest pump manufacturer.

== Early life and education ==
Gould was born on March 15, 1877, in Seneca Falls, New York, the eldest of five children born to Seabury S. Gould II and Mary Mitchell (née Judd) Gould. Through his mother, he was the grandson of politician Norman B. Judd. Other ancestors include Richard Mather and Richard Smith.

Educated between Seneca Falls and the Lawrenceville School, he graduated from Cornell University in 1899, with an engineer's degree. At Cornell, he was class president for a year, and was a member of Quill and Dagger and Sigma Phi.

== Career ==
Gould worked as a mechanical engineer. In September 1899, he was hired to Goulds Pumps, being made a secretary in 1905, followed by vice-president, then in 1908, became president. Under his leadership, Goulds Pumps became the world's largest pump manufacturer. He was also a school commissioner.

Gould was a Republican. He was an alternate delegate to the 1908 Republica National Convention and a delegate to the 1916 Convention. From 1912 to 1923, he was chairman of the Seneca County Republican Committee, and from 1914 to 1922, was a member of the New York Republican State Committee.

Following the death of Sereno E. Payne, Gould was elected to the United States House of Representatives. He served from November 2, 1915, to March 3, 1923, representing New York's 36th district. While serving, he was a member of the Committees on Labor and on Oversight and Government Reform, as well as chairman of the Joint Committee on the Library. he introduced the bill which formed the United States House Science Subcommittee on Space and Aeronautics. He declined to be nominated for the following election. Ideologically, he was conservative.

== Personal life and death ==
After serving in Congress, Gould returned to working manufacturing. On July 2, 1921, he married Anna Benrath. He was Presbyterian, as well as a member of the Benevolent and Protective Order of Elks, the Knights Templar and the Shriners of the Freemasons, the Newcomen Society of the United States. He died on August 20, 1964, aged 87, in Geneva, and was buried at Restvale Cemetery, in Seneca Falls. An archive of his papers is held by Cornell University.

U.S. House of Representatives
Preceded by Sereno E. Payne	Member of the U.S. House of Representatives from New York's 36th congressional district 1915–1923	Succeeded by John Taber
