= John LaFalce =

American politician (1939–2025)

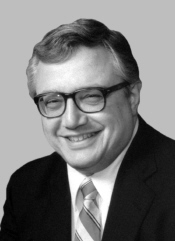

Member of the U.S. House of Representatives from New York
- In office January 3, 1975 – January 3, 2003
- Preceded by: Henry P. Smith III
- Succeeded by: Amo Houghton (redistricted)
- Constituency: 36th district (1975–1983); 32nd district (1983–1993); 29th district (1993–2003)

Member of the New York State Assembly from the 140th district
- In office January 1, 1973 – December 31, 1974
- Preceded by: James T. McFarland
- Succeeded by: Harold H. Izard

Member of the New York State Senate from the 53rd district
- In office January 1, 1971 – December 31, 1972
- Preceded by: William Adams
- Succeeded by: Gordon DeHond

Personal details
- Born: John Joseph LaFalce; October 6, 1939 Buffalo, New York, U.S.
- Died: April 11, 2025 (aged 85) Lockport, New York, U.S.
- Party: Democratic
- Spouse: Patricia Fisher
- Education: Canisius College (BA); Villanova University (JD)

Military service
- Branch: United States Army
- Service years: 1965–1967
- Rank: Captain
- LaFalce's voice LaFalce honors Cardinal John O'Connor, then archbishop of New York; Recorded February 15, 2000

John Joseph LaFalce (October 6, 1939 – April 11, 2025) was an American politician who served as a member of the United States House of Representatives from the state of New York from 1975 to 2003. He retired in 2002 after his district was merged with that of a fellow Democrat.

LaFalce was first elected to the 94th United States Congress in 1974 and re-elected to each succeeding Congress through the 107th United States Congress, serving his Western New York congressional district for 28 years, from 1975 to 2003. He served as Chairman of the United States House Small Business Committee from 1987 to 1995, and as Ranking Democrat of the House Committee on Financial Services from 1999 to 2003. He declined to seek re-election to the 108th Congress.

== Early life and education ==
LaFalce was born in Buffalo, New York, on October 6, 1939. He graduated Canisius High School before earning a bachelor's degree from Canisius College and Juris Doctor from Villanova University School of Law.

From 1965 to 1967, LaFalce served in the United States Army, leaving active duty with the rank of captain. He returned from military service to practice law in Western New York with the law firm of Jaeckle, Fleischmann & Mugel, and soon became active in public service.

== Career ==
=== State politics ===
LaFalce was a member of the New York State Senate (53rd D.) in 1971 and 1972; and a member of the New York State Assembly (140th D.) in 1973 and 1974.

=== Congress ===
In 1974, at the age of 35, LaFalce became the second Democrat, and the first since 1912, to win election to what was then the 36th congressional district of New York, which was based in Niagara Falls and also included much of northern Buffalo and the western suburbs of Rochester. LaFalce was elected as part of the "Watergate babies", the large Democratic freshman class elected in the wake of the Watergate scandal. He was reelected 13 times, rarely facing substantive opposition.

LaFalce played a key role in airing the grievances of the displaced residents of Love Canal, which was part of his district, and spearheading the federal government's subsequent response to the environmental disaster.

During his career in the House of Representatives, he served on both the Committee on Small Business and the Committee on Banking, Finance and Urban Affairs (now the Committee on Financial Services). In January 1987, he was elected by the Democratic U.S. Congressional Caucus as Chairman of the Committee on Small Business, thus becoming the first member of his class to chair a full, standing committee of the House. Following the change in control of Congress in 1994, he served as the committee's ranking Democrat. In February 1998, he was elected the ranking Democrat on the Financial Services Committee and served in that capacity through 2003.

LaFalce had numerous accomplishments as a legislator. For example, he is credited with having initiated the Competitiveness Policy Council.

He crafted legislation that became the Gramm–Leach–Bliley Act of 1999 for which he and three other colleagues earned the American Financial Leadership Award from the Financial Services Roundtable. LaFalce also played a key leadership role in introducing and championing what ultimately became the Sarbanes-Oxley Act, signed by President Bush in July 2002.

He was generally a liberal Democrat, but strongly opposed abortion. At the time of his death LaFalce served on the National Advisory Board of Democrats for Life of America. He also was among a handful of Democratic members who voted against the five Iran sanction bills that passed 1997–2001.

After the 2000 census, New York lost two congressional districts. One plan called for the merger of LaFalce's territory with the neighboring 27th district of Republican Jack Quinn, a longtime friend who represented the other portion of Buffalo. The final map merged his district with the Rochester-based 28th District of fellow Democrat Louise Slaughter. The new district retained Slaughter's district number, but geographically was more LaFalce's district; indeed, only a narrow band of territory from Buffalo to Rochester connected the two areas. Nonetheless, LaFalce did not seek reelection in 2002.

=== Later career ===
LaFalce served on the Board of Directors of State Bancorp, Inc., then parent company of State Bank of Long Island from 2007 to 2012.

LaFalce was Banking Board Member at the New York State Banking Department from 2008 to 2011.

He served as the Chairman and Director of Erie County Industrial Development Agency from April 1, 2012, to May 2013 and was a member of the advisory board to the Canadian American Business Council.

== Personal life and death ==
LaFalce was married to Patricia Fisher and had one son, Martin, who is a graduate of Georgetown University Law Center. Martin served as a public interest lawyer in New York City, and now is a law professor at St John's University School of Law.

LaFalce died from kidney failure at a hospice in Lockport, New York, on April 11, 2025, at the age of 85.

== Honors ==
LaFalce received honorary Doctor of Laws degrees from Villanova University School of Law (1991), St. John's University (1989), and Niagara University (1979), as well as an honorary Doctor of Humane Letters from Canisius College (1990).

U.S. House of Representatives
Preceded by Henry P. Smith III	Member of the U.S. House of Representatives from New York's 36th congressional district 1975–1983	Constituency abolished
Preceded by George C. Wortley	Member of the U.S. House of Representatives from New York's 32nd congressional district 1983–1993	Constituency abolished
Preceded by Parren Mitchell	Chair of the House Small Business Committee; 1987–1995	Succeeded by Jan Meyers
Preceded by Frank Horton	Member of the U.S. House of Representatives from New York's 39th congressional district 1993–2003	Succeeded by Amo Houghton
Preceded by Jan Meyers	Ranking Member of the House Small Business Committee; 1995–1998	Succeeded by Nydia Velázquez
Preceded by Henry B. González	Ranking Member of the House Financial Services Committee; 1998–2003	Succeeded by Barney Frank
