= Henry P. Smith III =

American politician (1911–1995)

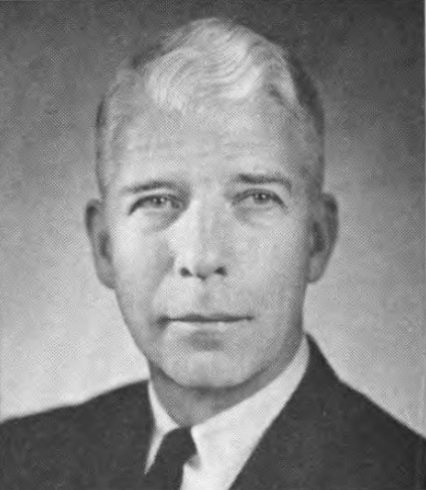

Member of the U.S. House of Representatives from New York
- In office January 3, 1965 – January 3, 1975
- Preceded by: William E. Miller
- Succeeded by: John LaFalce
- Constituency: 40th district (1965–1973); 36th district (1973–1975)

Mayor of North Tonawanda
- In office 1961–1963

Personal details
- Born: September 29, 1911 North Tonawanda, New York, U.S.
- Died: October 1, 1995 (aged 84) Washington, D.C., U.S.
- Party: Republican
- Education: Dartmouth College; Cornell Law School

Henry P. Smith III (September 29, 1911 – October 1, 1995) was an American politician and Republican member of the United States House of Representatives from New York.

Smith was born in North Tonawanda, New York. He graduated from Dartmouth College in 1933 and Cornell Law School in 1936. He was mayor of North Tonawanda, New York from 1961 until 1963. He was elected to Congress in 1964 after William E. Miller gave up the seat to run as Barry Goldwater's running mate. He served from January 3, 1965, until he retired from Congress January 3, 1975 after opting not to seek re-election.

In 1965 he was the sole no vote on a bill to introduce penalties for any person who "knowingly destroys, knowingly mutilates" their draft card.

He is remembered, among other things, for suggesting during the Judiciary Committee hearing on Richard Nixon's impeachment in 1974 that the bombing of Cambodia be added to the articles of impeachment, and that if it were, he would support that article. After serving in Congress, Smith spent time as chairman of the United States section of the International Joint Commission and as executive director of the Association to Unite the Democracies.

== Sources ==
- United States Congress. "Henry P. Smith III (id: S000548)". Biographical Directory of the United States Congress.

U.S. House of Representatives
Preceded by William E. Miller	Member of the U.S. House of Representatives from New York's 40th congressional district 1965–1973	Succeeded by District 40 eliminated after the 1970 census
Preceded by Frank Horton	Member of the U.S. House of Representatives from New York's 36th congressional district 1973–1975	Succeeded by John LaFalce
