= Clarence MacGregor =

American politician

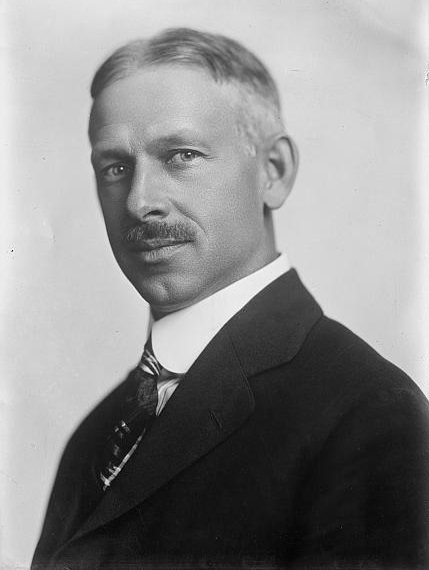

Member of the U.S. House of Representatives from New York's 41st district
- In office March 4, 1919 – December 31, 1928
- Preceded by: Charles Bennett Smith
- Succeeded by: Edmund F. Cooke

Personal details
- Born: September 16, 1872 Newark, New York, US
- Died: February 18, 1952 (aged 79) Buffalo, New York, US
- Party: Republican

Clarence MacGregor (September 16, 1872 – February 18, 1952) was a Republican member of the United States House of Representatives from New York.

== Life ==
MacGregor was born in Newark, New York. He graduated from Hartwick Seminary in 1893. He was a member of the New York State Assembly (Erie Co., 8th D.) in 1908, 1909, 1910, 1911 and 1912.

He was elected as a Republican to the 66th, 67th, 68th, 69th and 70th United States Congresses, holding office from March 4, 1919, until his resignation on December 31, 1928.

He was a justice of the New York Supreme Court from 1929 until the end of 1942 when he reached the constitutional age limit. He was appointed official referee of the New York Supreme Court and served from January 7, 1943, until his death in Buffalo, New York.

== Sources ==
- United States Congress. "Clarence MacGregor (id: M000009)". Biographical Directory of the United States Congress.

New York State Assembly
Preceded by John K. Patton	New York State Assembly; Erie County, 8th District; 1908–1912	Succeeded by George Geoghan
U.S. House of Representatives
Preceded by Charles B. Smith	Member of the U.S. House of Representatives from New York's 41st congressional district 1919–1928	Succeeded by Edmund F. Cooke
