= Frank Horton (New York politician) =

American politician (1919–2004)

Frank J. Horton
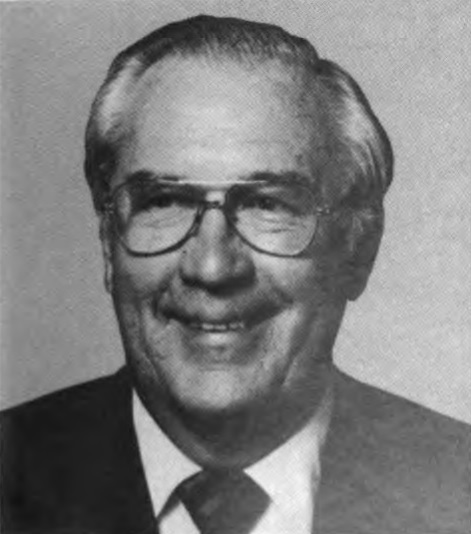
- From 1983's Pocket Congressional Directory of the Ninety-Eighth Congress

Member of the U.S. House of Representatives from New York
- In office January 3, 1963 – January 3, 1993
- Preceded by: Jessica M. Weis (redistricting)
- Succeeded by: John J. LaFalce
- Constituency: 36th district (1963–73); 34th district (1973–83); 29th district (1983–93)

Personal details
- Born: December 12, 1919 Cuero, Texas, U.S.
- Died: August 30, 2004 (aged 84) Winchester, Virginia, U.S.
- Party: Republican
- Spouse(s): Marjorie Wilcox Horton (div.); Nancy Flood Horton
- Education: Louisiana State University (B.A.); Cornell Law School (LL.B.)
- Profession: Lawyer
- Frank Horton's voice Horton speaks in support of the Prompt Payment Act Amendments of 1988; Recorded July 26, 1988

Frank Jefferson Horton (December 12, 1919 – August 30, 2004) was a United States representative from New York State.

== Early life and career ==
Horton was born in Cuero, Texas and was a graduate of Louisiana State University (B.A., 1941) where he was a member of Kappa Sigma fraternity (Gamma chapter). He enlisted in the U.S. Army in 1941 and served until the end of World War II. He then attended Cornell Law School in Ithaca, New York and received a Bachelor of Laws in 1947, the same year that he was admitted to the New York Bar. From 1956 to 1962 he was the President of Rochester Community Baseball, Inc. From 1959 to 1961, Horton served as the Executive Vice President of the International Baseball League, as well as the League's attorney.

== Political career ==
Horton was a member of the Rochester City Council from 1955 to 1961. Elected to the House of Representatives in 1962 as a Republican, Horton was re-elected to 14 additional terms.

In 1966, along with three Republican Senators and four other Republican Representatives, Horton signed a telegram sent to Georgia Governor Carl E. Sanders regarding the Georgia legislature's refusal to seat the recently elected Julian Bond in their state House of Representatives. This refusal, said the telegram, was "a dangerous attack on representative government. None of us agree with Mr. Bond's views on the Vietnam War; in fact we strongly repudiate these views. But unless otherwise determined by a court of law, which the Georgia Legislature is not, he is entitled to express them."

Horton was known as a liberal, a Rockefeller Republican and "the least partisan of Representatives." He rose to the position of Ranking Minority Member of the Government Operations Committee (now known as the United States House Committee on Oversight and Government Reform.)

Horton retired from Congress in 1992 when redistricting placed him in the same district as his friend Rep. Louise Slaughter.

While in Congress, Horton proposed making the United States Environmental Protection Agency a cabinet-level agency and helped introduce the Whistleblower Protection Act in 1987. Horton also introduced legislation which designated the month of May as Asian Pacific American Heritage Month.

== See also ==
- List of federal political scandals in the United States

== Notes ==
U.S. House of Representatives
Preceded by John Taber	Member of the U.S. House of Representatives from New York's 36th congressional district 1963–1973	Succeeded by Henry P. Smith III
Preceded by John H. Terry	Member of the U.S. House of Representatives from New York's 34th congressional district 1973–1983	Succeeded by Stan Lundine
Preceded by Gerald Solomon	Member of the U.S. House of Representatives from New York's 29th congressional district 1983–1993	Succeeded by John LaFalce
Preceded by Florence P. Dwyer	Ranking Member of the House Government Operations Committee; 1973–1993	Succeeded by William Clinger
