= Charles Bennett Smith =

American politician

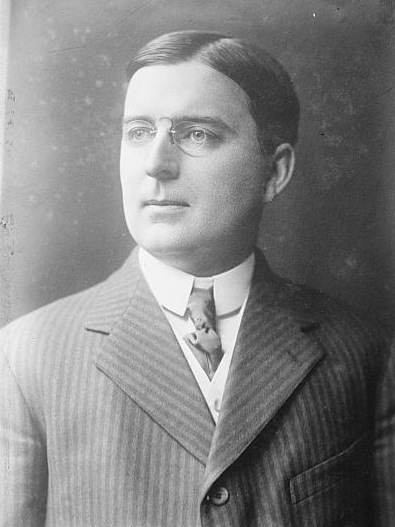

Member of the U.S. House of Representatives from New York
- In office March 4, 1911 – March 3, 1919
- Preceded by: De Alva S. Alexander
- Succeeded by: Clarence MacGregor
- Constituency: 36th district (1911–1913); 41st district (1913–1919)

Personal details
- Born: September 14, 1870 Sardinia, New York
- Died: May 21, 1939 (aged 68) Wilmington, New York
- Resting place: Mount Olivet Cemetery
- Party: Democratic

Charles Bennett Smith (September 14, 1870 – May 21, 1939) was an American newspaperman and politician who served four terms as a U.S. representative from New York from 1911 to 1919.

== Biography ==
Born in Sardinia, New York, Smith attended the district schools, and in 1886 graduated from Arcade Academy in Arcade, New York. He farmed, and subsequently became a railroad telegraph operator.

He was a reporter for the Buffalo Courier from 1890 to 1893, and he became managing editor of the Buffalo Times in 1894. He later served as editor of the Buffalo Evening Enquirer and the Buffalo Morning Courier.

Smith was appointed a member of the Buffalo Board of School Examiners and served two years as its chairman.

=== Congress ===
Smith was elected as a Democrat to the Sixty-second and to the three succeeding Congresses (March 4, 1911 – March 3, 1919). In his first election in 1910 he won by one vote.

He served as chairman of the Committee on Foreign Affairs (Sixty-second Congress), Committee on Expenditures in the Department of Commerce (Sixty-fourth Congress), Committee on Patents (Sixty-fifth Congress). He was an unsuccessful candidate for reelection in 1918 to the Sixty-sixth Congress.

=== Later career and death ===
He engaged in commercial and industrial pursuits in Buffalo, New York. He was the state Superintendent of Standards and Purchases from 1935 until his death in Wilmington, New York, May 21, 1939.

He was interred in Mount Olivet Cemetery, Tonawanda, New York.

=== Family ===
Smith was married to Frances G. Stanton (1871–1931), who worked with him as a newspaper reporter and editor, and served as New York's Civil Service Commissioner from 1929 until her death.

U.S. House of Representatives
| Preceded by De Alva S. Alexander | Member of the U.S. House of Representatives from New York's 36th congressional district 1911–1913 | Succeeded by Sereno E. Payne |
| New district | Member of the U.S. House of Representatives from New York's 41st congressional district 1913–1919 | Succeeded by Clarence MacGregor |
