= James P. B. Duffy =

American politician

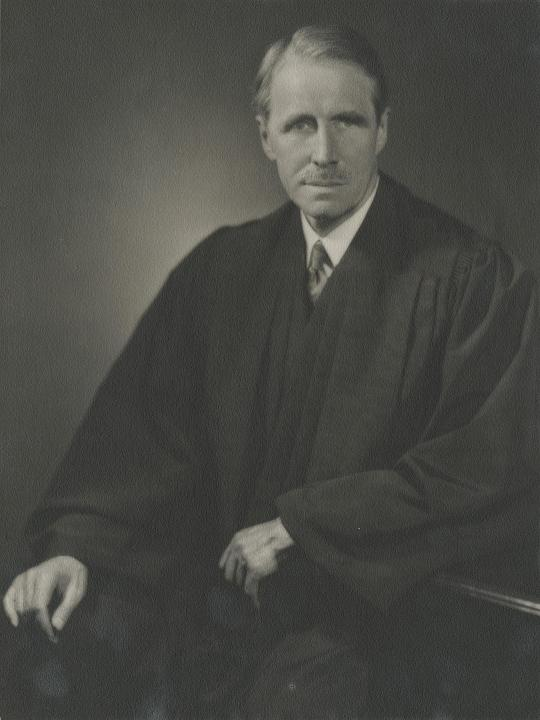

Justice of the New York Supreme Court
- In office April 20, 1937 – December 31, 1937

Member of the U.S. House of Representatives from New York's 38th district
- In office January 3, 1935 – January 3, 1937
- Preceded by: James L. Whitley
- Succeeded by: George B. Kelly

Personal details
- Born: November 25, 1878 Rochester, New York, U.S.
- Died: January 8, 1969 (aged 90) Rochester, New York, U.S.
- Resting place: Holy Sepulchre Cemetery
- Party: Democratic
- Education: Georgetown University; Harvard Law School

James Patrick Bernard Duffy (November 25, 1878 – January 8, 1969) was an American lawyer, jurist, and politician who served one term as a Democratic member of the United States House of Representatives from New York from 1935 to 1937.

== Early life and career ==
Duffy was born in Rochester, New York, one of nine children. He graduated from Georgetown University in 1901 and from Harvard Law School in 1904. He was admitted to the bar the same year and began practice in partnership with Republican James Breck Perkins, a member of Congress. He abandoned the practice of law in 1914 acceding to his father's request to take over as manager of The Duffy-Powers Department Store, the family business. There he remained until the concern went bankrupt in 1932.

== Political career ==
Duffy was an avid Democratic Party member and held a series of political posts before and after his period on the bench. He was a member of the City of Rochester, New York School Board from 1905 to 1932, and a member of the New York State Alcoholic Beverage Control Board from 1933 to 1934.

=== Congress ===
He was elected to Congress in 1934, having defeated incumbent Republican James L. Whitley and represented New York's 38th congressional district from January 3, 1935, until January 3, 1937, departing due to his defeat for renomination in 1936.

=== Later career and interests ===
He was then appointed by Governor Lehman to the New York Supreme Court on April 20, 1937, and served until December 31, 1937. He was defeated by Nathan Lapham in the subsequent election and served until December 31, 1937. Duffy practiced law in partnership from 1938 onward, and sat on the New York State Probation Commission from 1938 to 1944. During the course of his life, Duffy was ubiquitous in the Rochester, New York, region.

He was a founder and for fifty-two years Director of Family Services of Rochester, fifty-two years a Trustee of the Chamber of Commerce, thirty-four years a counsel to the local Red Cross, forty-two years a Trustee of the Community Chest, thirty-four years a Commissioner of the Rochester Museum, thirty-four years a Trustee of the Rochester Savings Bank, thirty-two years a Director and one year President of the local Automobile Club, fifty-two years a Trustee of St. Patrick's Church and three years a functionary of the United Service Organization. He was a member of nine different clubs and brotherhoods.

He received numerous honors during the course of his life, most notable his designation as a Knight of St. Gregory and a Knight of Malta by Pope Pius XI. One report indicated that he went to Mass every day, carried a missal at all times, and meticulously recorded in all his diaries.

In addition, Congressman Duffy's sister Constance Josephine married Bishop Thomas Francis Hickey's brother Jeremiah Griffin.

== Death ==
Duffy died at St. Anne's Home in Rochester, New York, on January 8, 1969, and was laid to rest in Holy Sepulchre Cemetery. "James P. B. Duffy School No. 12" in Rochester, New York, was named in his honor.

== Sources ==
- United States Congress. "James P. B. Duffy (id: D000519)". Biographical Directory of the United States Congress.

U.S. House of Representatives
Preceded by James L. Whitley	Member of the U.S. House of Representatives from New York's 38th congressional district 1935–1937	Succeeded by George B. Kelly
