= New York's 38th congressional district =

Former congressional district

Coordinates: 42°47′N 78°40′W

- Obsolete district
- Created: 1910
- Eliminated: 1980
- Years active: 1913–1983

New York's 38th congressional district was a congressional district for the United States House of Representatives in New York. It was created in 1913 as a result of the 1910 U.S. census and eliminated in 1983 as a result of the redistricting cycle after the 1980 census. It was last represented by Republican Jack Kemp who was redistricted into the 31st congressional district.

== Components ==
1973–1983:

Parts of Erie County

1971–1973:

All of Allegany County, Cattaraugus County, Chautauqua County and Steuben County
Parts of Erie County

1963–1971:

All of Allegany County, Cattaraugus County, Chautauqua County, Schuyler County and Steuben County

1953–1963:

All of Wayne County
Parts of Monroe County

1945–1953:

All of Cayuga County, Cortland County, Ontario County, Seneca County, Wayne County and Yates County

1913–1945:

Parts of Monroe County

== List of members representing the district ==
Representative	Party	Term	Cong ress	Electoral history
District established March 4, 1913
Thomas B. Dunn (Rochester)	Republican	March 4, 1913 – March 3, 1923	63rd 64th 65th 66th 67th	Elected in 1912. Re-elected in 1914. Re-elected in 1916. Re-elected in 1918. Re-elected in 1920. Retired.
Meyer Jacobstein (Rochester)	Democratic	March 4, 1923 – March 3, 1929	68th 69th 70th	Elected in 1922. Re-elected in 1924. Re-elected in 1926. Retired.
James L. Whitley (Rochester)	Republican	March 4, 1929 – January 3, 1935	71st 72nd 73rd	Elected in 1928. Re-elected in 1930. Re-elected in 1932. Lost re-election.
James P.B. Duffy (Rochester)	Democratic	January 3, 1935 – January 3, 1937	74th	Elected in 1934. Lost renomination.
George B. Kelly (Rochester)	Democratic	January 3, 1937 – January 3, 1939	75th	Elected in 1936. Lost re-election.
Joseph J. O'Brien (East Rochester)	Republican	January 3, 1939 – January 3, 1945	76th 77th 78th	Elected in 1938. Re-elected in 1940. Re-elected in 1942. Lost re-election.
John Taber (Auburn)	Republican	January 3, 1945 – January 3, 1953	79th 80th 81st 82nd	Redistricted from the 36th district and re-elected in 1944. Re-elected in 1946. Re-elected in 1948. Re-elected in 1950. Redistricted to the 36th district.
Kenneth Keating (Rochester)	Republican	January 3, 1953 – January 3, 1959	83rd 84th 85th	Redistricted from 40th district and re-elected in 1952. Re-elected in 1954. Re-elected in 1956. Retired to run for U.S. Senator.
Jessica M. Weis (Rochester)	Republican	January 3, 1959 – January 3, 1963	86th 87th	Elected in 1958. Re-elected in 1960. Redistricted to the 36th district and retired.
Charles Goodell (Jamestown)	Republican	January 3, 1963 – September 9, 1968	88th 89th 90th	Redistricted from the 43rd district and re-elected in 1962. Re-elected in 1964. Re-elected in 1966. Resigned upon being appointed to the United States Senate.
Vacant		September 10, 1968 – January 2, 1969	90th	
James F. Hastings (Allegany)	Republican	January 3, 1969 – January 3, 1973	91st 92nd	Elected in 1968. Re-elected in 1970. Redistricted to the 39th district.
Jack Kemp (Hamburg)	Republican	January 3, 1973 – January 3, 1983	93rd 94th 95th 96th 97th	Redistricted from the 39th district and re-elected in 1972. Re-elected in 1974. Re-elected in 1976. Re-elected in 1978. Re-elected in 1980. Redistricted to the 31st district.
District dissolved January 3, 1983

== Election results ==
The following chart shows historic election results. Bold type indicates victor. Italic type indicates incumbent.

Year	Democratic	Republican	Other
1980	Gale A. Denn: 37,875	**Jack Kemp**: 167,434	
1978		**Jack Kemp**: 113,928	James A. Peck (Liberal): 6,204
1976	Peter J. Geraci: 46,307	**Jack Kemp**: 165,702	
1974	Barbara C. Wicks: 48,929	**Jack Kemp**: 126,687	
1972	Anthony P. LoRusso: 57,585	**Jack Kemp**: 156,967	
1970	James G. Cretekos: 37,961	**James F. Hastings**: 94,906	
1968	Wilbur White, Jr.: 47,093	James F. Hastings: 90,281	Gust E. Johnson (Conservative): 3,594; Charles F. Schwartz (Liberal): 1,353
1966	Edison Le Roy, Jr.: 35,785	**Charles E. Goodell**: 82,137	Charles F. Schwartz (Liberal): 2,546; Lloyd R. Murphy (Conservative): 1,695
1964	Robert V. Kelley: 61,179	**Charles E. Goodell**: 90,201	
1962	T. Joseph Lynch: 36,992	**Charles E. Goodell**: 83,361	Leo M. Brushingham (Liberal): 1,611
1960	Arthur B. Curran, Jr.: 84,716	**Jessica M. Weis**: 114,871	
1958	Alphonse L. Cassetti: 66,806	Jessica M. Weis: 92,944	
1956	Reed Harding: 53,477	**Kenneth B. Keating**: 135,572	
1954	Rubin Brodsky: 40,400	**Kenneth B. Keating**: 103,293	
1952	Victor Kruppenbacher: 56,177	**Kenneth B. Keating**: 128,566	Manuel Gitlin (American Labor): 691
1950	Robert G. Gordon: 31,115	**John Taber**: 68,474	
1948	Francis J. Souhan: 48,222	**John Taber**: 66,695	
1946	George T. Franklin: 24,576	**John Taber**: 63,382	
1944	Frank J. Erwin: 36,327	**John Taber**: 75,432	Walter O'Hagan (American Labor): 3,294
1942	Walden Moore: 53,889	**Joseph J. O'Brien**: 77,970	
1940	George B. Kelly: 86,197	**Joseph J. O'Brien**: 92,866	
1938	George B. Kelly: 63,325	Joseph J. O'Brien: 80,963	James Oakes (Socialist): 777
1936	George B. Kelly: 82,708	Joseph Fritsch, Jr.: 72,910	Glenn W. Simpson: 2,519; Richard M. Briggs (Socialist): 1,680; Ezra Harari (Communist): 414
1934	James P.B. Duffy: 64,434	James L. Whitley: 50,066	Jack Britt Gearity (Socialist): 2,876; Getrude Walsh (Communist): 921; James A. Alesi: 464; Harry Paul: 213
1932	Charles Stanton: 58,775	**James L. Whitley**: 64,003	Arthur Rathjen (Law Preservation): 12,097; Richard M. Briggs (Socialist): 3,637
1930	Nelson E. Spencer: 37,500	**James L. Whitley**: 50,083	Harry Hoffman (Socialist): 2,985
1928	Charles Stanton: 43,009	James L. Whitley: 47,298	William MacFarlane: 38,324; Charles Messinger (Socialist): 2,782
1926	**Meyer Jacobstein**: 42,803	James E. Cuff: 41,191	William J. Bolton (Socialist): 3,514
1924	**Meyer Jacobstein**: 63,997	John J. McInerney: 33,895	
1922	Meyer Jacobstein: 35,319	Frederick T. Pierson: 33,690	Joel Moses (Socialist): 5,101
1920	Hiram R. Wood: 20,281	**Thomas B. Dunn**: 56,796	Charles Messinger (Socialist): 8,369; H.C. Gregory (Farmer-Labor): 659
