= New York's 36th congressional district =

Former congressional district

Coordinates: 43°11′N 78°28′W

- Obsolete district
- Created: 1900
- Eliminated: 1980
- Years active: 1903–1983

New York's 36th congressional district was a congressional district for the United States House of Representatives in New York. It was created in 1903 as a result of the 1900 census. It was eliminated as a result of the redistricting cycle after the 1980 census. It was last represented by John LaFalce who was redistricted into the 32nd district.

== Past components ==
1973–1983:

All of Niagara, Orleans
Parts of Erie, Monroe

1963–1973:

All of Wayne
Parts of Monroe

1953–1963:

All of Cayuga, Chenango, Cortland, Ontario, Schuyler, Seneca, Tompkins, Yates

1945–1953:

All of Onondaga

1913–1945:

All of Cayuga, Ontario, Seneca, Wayne, Yates

1903–1913:

All of Erie and Parts of Buffalo

== List of members representing the district ==
Member	Party	Years	Cong ress	Electoral history
District established March 4, 1903
De Alva S. Alexander (Buffalo)	Republican	March 4, 1903 – March 3, 1911	58th 59th 60th 61st	Redistricted from the 33rd district and re-elected in 1902. Re-elected in 1904. Re-elected in 1906. Re-elected in 1908. Lost re-election.
Charles B. Smith (Buffalo)	Democratic	March 4, 1911 – March 3, 1913	62nd	Elected in 1910. Redistricted to the 41st district.
Sereno E. Payne (Auburn)	Republican	March 4, 1913 – December 10, 1914	63rd	Redistricted from the 31st district and re-elected in 1912. Re-elected in 1914, but died before the new Congress began
Vacant		December 11, 1914 – November 1, 1915	63rd	
Norman J. Gould (Seneca Falls)	Republican	November 2, 1915 – March 3, 1923	64th 65th 66th 67th	Elected to finish the vacant term Re-elected in 1916. Re-elected in 1918. Re-elected in 1920. Retired.
John Taber (Auburn)	Republican	March 4, 1923 – January 3, 1945	68th 69th 70th 71st 72nd 73rd 74th 75th 76th 77th 78th	Elected in 1922. Re-elected in 1924. Re-elected in 1926. Re-elected in 1928. Re-elected in 1930. Re-elected in 1932. Re-elected in 1934. Re-elected in 1936. Re-elected in 1938. Re-elected in 1940. Re-elected in 1942. Redistricted to the 38th district.
Clarence E. Hancock (Syracuse)	Republican	January 3, 1945 – January 3, 1947	79th	Redistricted from the 35th district and re-elected in 1944. Retired.
R. Walter Riehlman (Tully)	Republican	January 3, 1947 – January 3, 1953	80th 81st 82nd	Elected in 1946. Re-elected in 1948. Re-elected in 1950. Redistricted to the 35th district.
John Taber (Auburn)	Republican	January 3, 1953 – January 3, 1963	83rd 84th 85th 86th 87th	Redistricted from the 38th district and re-elected in 1952. Re-elected in 1954. Re-elected in 1956. Re-elected in 1958. Re-elected in 1960. Retired rather than face a redistricting contest
Frank Horton (Rochester)	Republican	January 3, 1963 – January 3, 1973	88th 89th 90th 91st 92nd	Elected in 1962. Re-elected in 1964. Re-elected in 1966. Re-elected in 1968. Re-elected in 1970. Redistricted to the 34th district.
Henry P. Smith III (North Tonawanda)	Republican	January 3, 1973 – January 3, 1975	93rd	Redistricted from the 40th district and re-elected in 1972. Retired.
John LaFalce (Tonawanda)	Democratic	January 3, 1975 – January 3, 1983	94th 95th 96th 97th	Elected in 1974. Re-elected in 1976. Re-elected in 1978. Re-elected in 1980. Redistricted to the 32nd district.
District dissolved January 3, 1983

== Election results ==
Year	Democratic	Republican	Other
1920	George K. Shuler: 23,534	√ Norman J. Gould (inc.): 49,160	
1922	David J. Sims: 22,980	√ John Taber: 43,633	
1924	Michael J. Maney: 22,890	√ John Taber (inc.): 57,865	
1926	J. Seldon Brandt: 20,886	√ John Taber (inc.): 48,783	
1928	Joseph P. Craugh: 30,503	√ John Taber (inc.): 68,095	
1930	Joseph P. Craugh: 23,763	√ John Taber (inc.): 43,132	Elmer Pierce (Socialist): 1,272
1932	Lithgow Osborne: 36,648	√ John Taber (inc.): 58,484	Esther Wright (Socialist): 896
1934	Dennis F. Sullivan: 27,129	√ John Taber (inc.): 45,431	Alexander Benedict (Socialist): 1,659; Charles Van Gordon (Law Preservation): 287
1936	William A. Aiken: 32,318	√ John Taber (inc.): 61,271	John E. DuBois (Townsend): 8,003; Walter O'Hagen (Socialist): 1,908
1938	George F. Davis: 20,636	√ John Taber (inc.): 48,344	Charles P. Russell (American Labor): 19,020; Walter O'Hagen (Socialist): 451
1940	John W. Kennelly: 40,929	√ John Taber (inc.): 64,507	Walter Walczyck (American Labor): 2,814
1942	Charles Osborne: 28,502	√ John Taber (inc.): 47,620	
1944	George M. Haight: 70,012	√ Clarence E. Hancock (inc.): 79,535	
1946	Lawson Barnes: 44,371	√ R. Walter Riehlman: 76,372	
1948	Richard T. Mosher: 71,847	√ R. Walter Riehlman (inc.): 78,409	Sidney H. Greenburg (American Labor): 4,883
1950	Alfred W. Haight: 50,107	√ R. Walter Riehlman (inc.): 81,508	
1952	Donald J. O'Connor: 47,189	√ John Taber (inc.): 110,304	Lila K. Larson (American Labor): 311
1954	Daniel J. Carey: 36,910	√ John Taber (inc.): 79,850	
1956	Lewis S. Bell: 47,764	√ John Taber (inc.): 109,101	
1958	Frank B. Lent: 45,822	√ John Taber (inc.): 84,019	
1960	Francis J. Souhan: 76,120	√ John Taber (inc.): 84,441	
1962	Robert R. Bickal: 66,371	√ Frank Horton: 96,581	
1964	John C. Williams: 81,509	√ Frank Horton (inc.): 107,406	Helmut A. Zander (Liberal): 2,834
1966	Milo Thomas: 37,129	√ Frank Horton (inc.): 110,541	Robert H. Detig (Conservative): 10,493; Donald P. Feder (Liberal): 6,048
1968	Augustine J. Marvin: 46,008	√ Frank Horton (inc.): 138,400	Leo J. Kesselring (Conservative): 9,916; Robert L. Holmes (Liberal): 2,409
1970	Jordan E. Pappas: 38,898	√ Frank Horton (inc.): 123,209	David F. Hampson (Conservative): 10,442; Morley Schloss (Liberal): 2,165
1972	Max McCarthy: 82,095	√ Henry P. Smith III (inc.): 110,238	
1974	√ John LaFalce: 90,498	Russell A. Rourke: 61,442	
1976	√ John LaFalce (inc.): 123,246	Ralph J. Argen: 61,701	
1978	√ John LaFalce (inc.): 99,497	Francina Joyce Cartonia: 31,527	Francis P. Mundy (Conservative): 3,233
1980	√ John LaFalce (inc.): 122,929	H. William Feder: 48,428	
