= Joseph J. O'Brien =

American politician

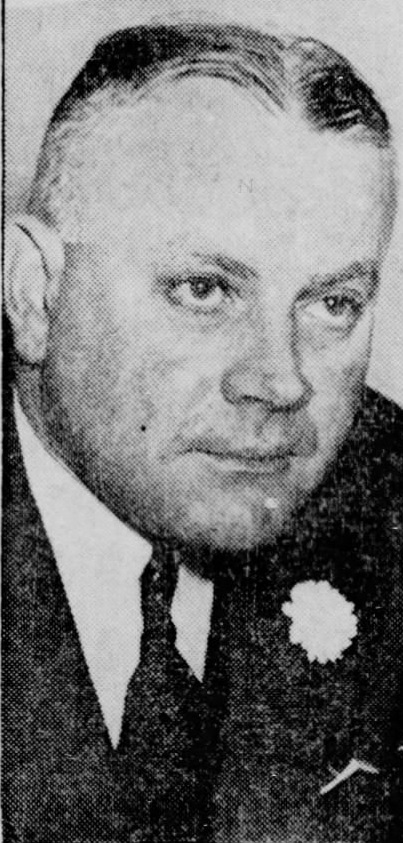
- From the August 25, 1940 edition of the Rochester Democrat and Chronicle.

Member of the U.S. House of Representatives from New York's 38th district
- In office January 3, 1939 – January 3, 1945
- Preceded by: George B. Kelly
- Succeeded by: John Taber

Personal details
- Born: October 9, 1897 Rochester, New York, US
- Died: January 23, 1953 (aged 55) Rochester, New York, US
- Resting place: Holy Sepulchre Cemetery, Rochester, New York
- Education: St. Jerome's University; McGill University
- Profession: Railroad construction supervisor Public official

Joseph John O'Brien (October 9, 1897 – January 23, 1953) was a Republican member of the United States House of Representatives from New York.

== Biography ==
O'Brien was born in Rochester, New York. He graduated from Rochester's Cathedral High School, and attended St. Jerome's University and McGill University. He served in the United States Navy from 1917 until 1919.

After his World War I service, O'Brien was employed by the New York Central Railroad from 1919 until 1938, and advanced to the position of chief construction inspector. From 1919 until 1926 he was both a semiprofessional football player and a professional wrestler.

He entered politics as a Republican, and was elected head of the East Rochester Republican Club in 1932. He served as treasurer of East Rochester, New York from 1932 until 1935 and assessor from 1935 until 1938.

O'Brien was elected to Congress in 1938 and represented New York's 38th congressional district from January 3, 1939, until January 3, 1945. He lost a bid for re-election in 1944.

After leaving Congress, O'Brien was the Rochester area administrator for the state Workmen's Compensation Act.

He died in Rochester, New York after suffering a series of heart attacks beginning in 1950. He was buried at Holy Sepulchre Cemetery in Rochester.

== Family ==
In 1924, O'Brien married Mildred Erway. They had no children.

== Sources ==
- United States Congress. "Joseph J. O'Brien (id: O000014)". Biographical Directory of the United States Congress.

U.S. House of Representatives
Preceded by George B. Kelly	Member of the U.S. House of Representatives from New York's 38th congressional district 1939–1945	Succeeded by John Taber
