= J. Francis Harter =

American politician (1897–1947)

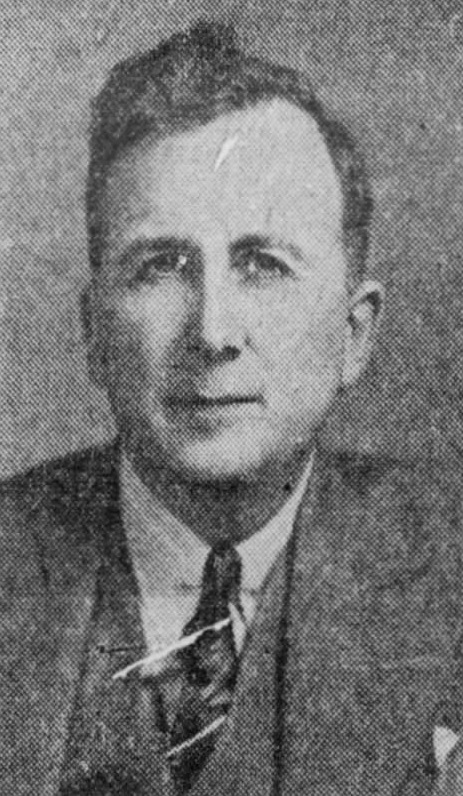

Member of the U.S. House of Representatives from New York's 41st district
- In office January 3, 1939 – January 3, 1941
- Preceded by: Alfred F. Beiter
- Succeeded by: Alfred F. Beiter

Personal details
- Born: September 1, 1897 Perry, New York, US
- Died: December 20, 1947 (aged 50) Eggertsville, New York, US
- Party: Republican

John Francis Harter (September 1, 1897 – December 20, 1947) was a Republican member of the United States House of Representatives from New York.

Harter was born in Perry, New York. He attended the United States Army Officers' Training Camp at Camp Lee, Virginia during World War I.

He received a law degree from the University at Buffalo Law School in 1919 and practiced in Buffalo.

Harter was elected to the United States House of Representatives in 1938 and served in the 67th Congress, January 3, 1939 to January 3, 1941. He ran unsuccessfully for reelection in 1940 against Alfred F. Beiter. He died in Eggertsville, New York on December 20, 1947, and was buried at Forest Lawn Cemetery in Buffalo.

== Family ==
Harter was married to Lillian Unholz Harter. They were the parents of Charles F. Harter and Geraldine R. Harter.

== Sources ==
- United States Congress. "J. Francis Harter (id: H000295)". Biographical Directory of the United States Congress.

U.S. House of Representatives
Preceded by Alfred F. Beiter	Member of the U.S. House of Representatives from New York's 41st congressional district 1939–1941	Succeeded by Alfred F. Beiter
