= John Taber =

American politician (1880–1965)

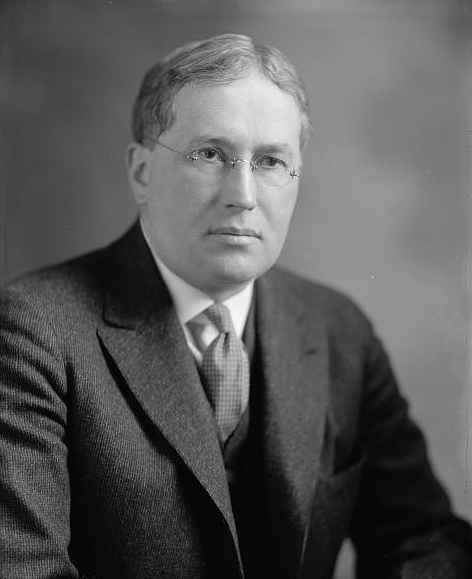

Chair of the House Appropriations Committee
- In office January 3, 1953 – January 3, 1955
- Preceded by: Clarence Cannon
- Succeeded by: Clarence Cannon
- In office January 3, 1947 – January 3, 1949
- Preceded by: Clarence Cannon
- Succeeded by: Clarence Cannon

Member of the U.S. House of Representatives from New York
- In office March 4, 1923 – January 3, 1963
- Preceded by: Norman J. Gould
- Succeeded by: Frank Horton (redistricting)
- Constituency: 36th district (1923–1945); 38th district (1945–1953); 36th district (1953–1963)

Personal details
- Born: May 5, 1880 Auburn, New York, US
- Died: November 22, 1965 (aged 85) Auburn, New York, US
- Resting place: Fort Hill Cemetery, Auburn
- Party: Republican
- Spouse: Gertrude Johnson Beard (m. 1929; died 1964)
- Children: 1
- Education: Yale University; New York Law School
- Profession: Attorney

John Taber (May 5, 1880 – November 22, 1965) was an American attorney and New York politician who represented parts of the Finger Lakes and Central New York regions (Note: Taber represented Cayuga, Ontario, Seneca, and Yates counties for his entire career. Taber represented Wayne County from 1923 to 1945, Cortland County from 1945 to 1963, and three counties in the Southern Tier (Chenango, Schuyler, and Tompkins) from 1953 to 1963.) in the United States House of Representatives from 1923 to 1963.

== Biography ==
Taber was born in Auburn, New York, on May 5, 1880, the son of attorney and businessman Franklin P. Taber and Susan (Parker) Taber. He attended the public schools of Auburn, and graduated from Auburn High School in 1898. He graduated from Yale University in 1902, and received his law degree from New York Law School in 1904. He attained admission to the bar in November 1914, and commenced practice in Auburn.

Taber represented Auburn's second ward on the Cayuga County Board of Supervisors in 1905 and 1906. From 1910 to 1918, he served as a special judge of the county court. Taber was a delegate to the Republican National Conventions in 1920, 1924, and 1936, and chairman of the Cayuga County Republican Committee from 1920 to 1925. In 1922, he was chosen to serve as president of the Auburn Chamber of Commerce.

He represented New York in the House of Representatives as a Republican from the 68th to the 87th Congresses (March 4, 1923 – January 3, 1963), where he was the chairman of the Committee on Appropriations during the 80th and 83rd Congresses.

He was not a candidate for renomination to the 88th Congress in 1962. Taber voted against the Civil Rights Acts of 1957 and 1960, as well as the 24th Amendment to the U.S. Constitution.

In 1945 Tabor was among the house members to visit the Clinton Engineer Works, and General Groves was amazed at his question there is only one thing that worries me. Are you sure that you are spending enough money at Oak Ridge? As he was critical of government expenditure Groves was amazed, and so was Henry Stimson when he was told about it.

Taber died in Auburn on November 22, 1965, and was interred at Fort Hill Cemetery in Auburn.

== Family ==
In 1929, Taber married Gertrude Johnson Beard, who had been working as his secretary. They were the parents of a son, Charles Beard Taber (1920-1969).

== Bibliography ==
Congressman John Taber of Auburn: Politics and Federal Appropriations, 1923–1962, Cary S. Henderson, Ph.D. dissertation, Duke University, 1964.

U.S. House of Representatives
Preceded by Norman J. Gould	Member of the U.S. House of Representatives from New York's 36th congressional district 1923–1945	Succeeded by Clarence E. Hancock
Preceded by Joseph J. O'Brien	Member of the U.S. House of Representatives from New York's 38th congressional district 1945–1953	Succeeded by Kenneth Keating
Preceded by R. Walter Riehlman	Member of the U.S. House of Representatives from New York's 36th congressional district 1953–1963	Succeeded by Frank Horton
