= New York's 41st congressional district =

Former congressional district

Coordinates: 42°53′N 78°51′W

- Obsolete district
- Created: 1910
- Eliminated: 1970
- Years active: 1913–1973

The 41st congressional district of New York was a congressional district for the United States House of Representatives in New York. It was created in 1913 as a result of the 1910 census. It was eliminated in 1973 as a result of the 1970 redistricting cycle after the 1970 United States census. It was last represented by Thaddeus J. Dulski who was redistricted into the 37th district.

== List of members representing the district ==
Representative	Party	Term	Cong ress	Electoral history	District location (counties)
District established March 4, 1913
Charles B. Smith (Buffalo)	Democratic	March 4, 1913 – March 3, 1919	63rd 64th 65th	Redistricted from the 36th district and re-elected in 1912. Re-elected in 1914. Re-elected in 1916. [data missing]	Parts of Erie
Clarence MacGregor (Buffalo)	Republican	March 4, 1919 – December 31, 1928	66th 67th 68th 69th 70th	Elected in 1918. Re-elected in 1920. Re-elected in 1922. Re-elected in 1924. Re-elected in 1926. Resigned after being elected as justice on New York Supreme Court.	Parts of Erie
Vacant		January 1, 1929 – March 3, 1929	70th		Parts of Erie
Edmund F. Cooke (Alden)	Republican	March 4, 1929 – March 3, 1933	71st 72nd	Elected in 1928. Re-elected in 1930. Lost re-election.	Parts of Erie
Alfred F. Beiter (Williamsville)	Democratic	March 4, 1933 – January 3, 1939	73rd 74th 75th	Elected in 1932. Re-elected in 1934. Re-elected in 1936. Lost re-election.	Parts of Erie
J. Francis Harter (Eggertsville)	Republican	January 3, 1939 – January 3, 1941	76th	Elected in 1938. Lost re-election.	Parts of Erie
Alfred F. Beiter (Williamsville)	Democratic	January 3, 1941 – January 3, 1943	77th	Re-elected in 1940. Lost re-election.	Parts of Erie
Joseph Mruk (Buffalo)	Republican	January 3, 1943 – January 3, 1945	78th	Elected in 1942. Unsuccessful candidate for renomination.	Parts of Erie
James W. Wadsworth Jr. (Geneseo)	Republican	January 3, 1945 – January 3, 1951	79th 80th 81st	Redistricted from the 39th district and re-elected in 1944. Re-elected in 1946. Re-elected in 1948.	All of Genesee, Livingston, Orleans, Wyoming; Parts of Monroe
Harold C. Ostertag (Attica)	Republican	January 3, 1951 – January 3, 1953	82nd	Elected in 1950. Redistricted to the 39th district.	All of Genesee, Livingston, Orleans, Wyoming; Parts of Monroe
Edmund P. Radwan (Buffalo)	Republican	January 3, 1953 – January 3, 1959	83rd 84th 85th	Redistricted from the 43rd district and re-elected in 1952. Re-elected in 1954. Re-elected in 1956. Retired.	Parts of Erie
Thaddeus J. Dulski (Buffalo)	Democratic	January 3, 1959 – January 3, 1973	86th 87th 88th 89th 90th 91st 92nd	Elected in 1958. Re-elected in 1960. Re-elected in 1962. Re-elected in 1964. Re-elected in 1966. Re-elected in 1968. Re-elected in 1970. Redistricted to the 37th district.	Parts of Erie
District dissolved January 3, 1973

== Election results ==
The following chart shows historic election results. Bold type indicates victor. Italic type indicates incumbent.

Year	Democratic	Republican	Other
1920	Al J. Egloff: 20,692	**Clarence MacGregor**: 30,560	Martin B. Heisler (Socialist): 4,836
1922	William P. Greiner: 16,301	**Clarence MacGregor**: 25,342	Frank Ehrenfried (Socialist): 4,067
1924	Edward C. Dethloff: 13,754	**Clarence MacGregor**: 40,449	Frank Ehrenfried (Socialist): 5,237
1926	Robert M. Smyth: 16,913	**Clarence MacGregor**: 35,739	Martin B. Heisler (Socialist): 2,273
1928	Fred C. Fornes: 37,057	Edmund F. Cooke: 44,641	Martin B. Heisler (Socialist): 3,075
1930	Henry F. Jerge: 25,861	**Edmund F. Cooke**: 26,995	Fred Weinheimer (Socialist): 2,344
1932	Alfred F. Beiter: 45,120	Edmund F. Cooke: 42,743	Robert A. Hoffman (Socialist): 2,280
1934	**Alfred F. Beiter**: 45,830	Carlton A. Fisher: 33,793	Ernest D. Baumann (Socialist): 2,704
1936	**Alfred F. Beiter**: 55,508	Fred Kohler: 45,113	Leonard P. Becht: 3,935; Benjamin M. Zalikowski: 3,630; Bruno Rantane (Socialist): 1,693; Frank Herron (Communist): 247
1938	Alfred F. Beiter: 45,516	J. Francis Harter: 46,784	Alice Lebert (Socialist): 393
1940	Alfred F. Beiter: 62,843	J. Francis Harter: 57,335	
1942	Alfred F. Beiter: 36,589	Joseph Mruk: 49,239	
1944	Jean Walrath: 41,991	**James W. Wadsworth, Jr.**: 71,988	
1946	Charles J. Reap: 26,332	**James W. Wadsworth, Jr.**: 65,975	
1948	Bernard E. Hart: 45,155	**James W. Wadsworth, Jr.**: 67,882	Helen Lopez (American Labor): 1,874
1950	Bernard E. Hart: 35,370	Harold C. Ostertag: 64,801	Helen Lopez (American Labor): 882
1952	Anthony F. Tauriello: 75,552	**Edmund P. Radwan**: 95,755	
1954	Benard J. Wojtkowiak: 45,144	**Edmund P. Radwan**: 77,259	
1956	Edward P. Jehle: 54,776	**Edmund P. Radwan**: 99,151	
1958	Thaddeus J. Dulski: 60,360	James O. Moore, Jr.: 59,634	
1960	**Thaddeus J. Dulski**: 82,114	Ralph J. Radwan: 63,889	
1962	**Thaddeus J. Dulski**: 93,982	Daniel J. Kij: 37,544	
1964	**Thaddeus J. Dulski**: 130,961	Joseph A. Klawon: 28,578	
1966	**Thaddeus J. Dulski**: 92,222	Francis X. Schwab, Jr.: 28,491	
1968	**Thaddeus J. Dulski**: 96,703	Edward P. Matter: 27,920	
1970	**Thaddeus J. Dulski**: 79,151	William M. Johns: 20,108	
