= 87th United States Congress =

1961–1963 U.S. Congress

←	86th	88th	→
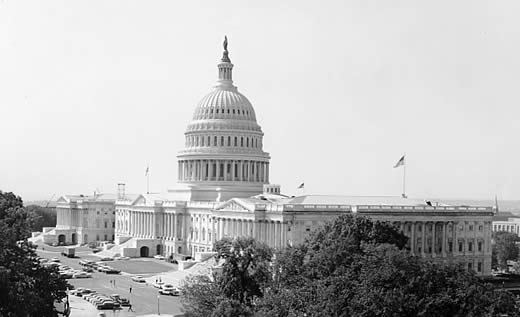
- United States Capitol (1962)

Overview
- Legislative body: United States Congress
- Jurisdiction: United States
- Term: January 3, 1961 – January 3, 1963

Senate
- Members: 100
- President: Richard Nixon (R) (Note: U.S. Vice President Richard Nixon's term as President of the Senate ended at noon January 20, 1961, when Lyndon B. Johnson's term began.) (until January 20, 1961); Lyndon B. Johnson (D) (from January 20, 1961)
- President pro tempore: Carl Hayden (D)
- Party control: Democratic

House of Representatives
- Members: 437
- Speaker: Sam Rayburn (D); John W. McCormack (D)
- Party control: Democratic

Sessions
- 1st: January 3, 1961 – September 27, 1961
- 2nd: January 10, 1962 – October 13, 1962

The 87th United States Congress was a meeting of the legislative branch of the United States federal government, composed of the United States Senate and the United States House of Representatives. It met in Washington, D.C. from January 3, 1961, to January 3, 1963, during the final weeks of Dwight D. Eisenhower's presidency and the first two years of John F. Kennedy's presidency. The apportionment of seats in the House of Representatives was based on the 1950 United States census, along with two seats temporarily added in 1959 (one member each from recently admitted states of Alaska and Hawaii).

Both chambers had a Democratic majority (albeit reduced in the House). With President Kennedy being sworn in on January 20, 1961, this gave the Democrats an overall federal government trifecta for the first time since the 82nd Congress in 1952.

== Major events ==
- January 3, 1961: President Eisenhower severed diplomatic and consular relations with Cuba.
- January 20, 1961: Inauguration of President John F. Kennedy.
- April 17, 1961: Bay of Pigs Invasion of Cuba began; it fails by April 19.
- May 4, 1961: Freedom Riders began interstate bus rides to test the new U.S. Supreme Court integration decision.
- May 5, 1961: Alan Shepard became the first American in space aboard Mercury-Redstone 3.
- May 25, 1961: President Kennedy announced his goal to put a man on the Moon before the end of the decade
- November 16, 1961: House Speaker Sam Rayburn dies from pancreatic cancer. His funeral is held on November 20.
- February 3, 1962: Embargo against Cuba was announced
- February 20, 1962: John Glenn became the first American to orbit the Earth
- March 26, 1962: Supreme Court ruled that federal courts could order state legislatures to reapportion seats (Baker v. Carr)
- October 1, 1962: James Meredith registered as the first black student at the University of Mississippi, escorted by Federal Marshals.
- October 14, 1962 - October 28, 1962: Cuban Missile Crisis

== Major legislation ==
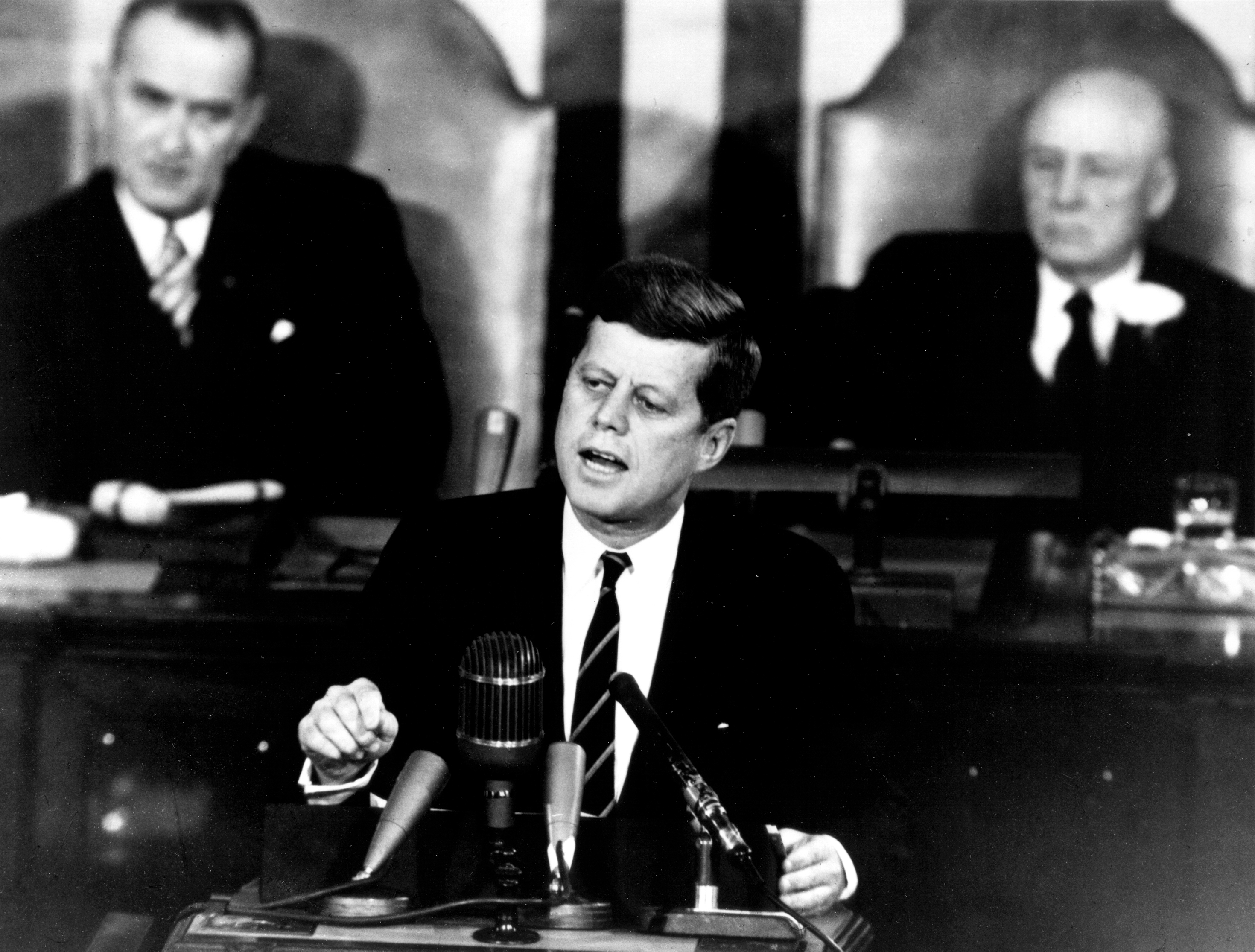
Senate President Lyndon Johnson (L) and House Speaker Sam Rayburn seated behind President John Kennedy during his first State of the Union address on January 30, 1961.

- May 5, 1961: Fair Labor Standards Amendments of 1961, Pub. L. 87–30, 75 Stat. 65
- June 30, 1961: Housing Act of 1961, Pub. L. 87–70, 75 Stat. 149
- August 30, 1961: Oil Pollution Act of 1961, Pub. L. 87–167, 75 Stat. 402
- September 4, 1961: Foreign Assistance Act of 1961, Pub. L. 87–195, 75 Stat. 424
- September 13, 1961: Interstate Wire Act of 1961, Pub. L. 87–216, 75 Stat. 491
- September 21, 1961: Mutual Educational and Cultural Exchange Act of 1961, Pub. L. 87–256, 75 Stat. 527
- September 22, 1961: Peace Corps Act of 1961, Pub. L. 87–293, 75 Stat. 612
- September 26, 1961: Arms Control and Disarmament Act of 1961, Pub. L. 87–297, 75 Stat. 631
- October 15, 1961: Community Health Services and Facilities Act, Pub. L. 87–395, 75 Stat. 824
- March 15, 1962: Manpower Development and Training Act, Pub. L. 87–415, 76 Stat. 23
- June 28, 1962: Migration and Refugee Assistance Act, Pub. L. 87–510, 76 Stat. 121
- August 31, 1962: Communications Satellite Act of 1962, Pub. L. 87–624, 76 Stat. 419
- October 11, 1962: Trade Expansion Act, Pub. L. 87–794, 76 Stat. 872
- October 16, 1962: Revenue Act of 1962, Pub. L. 87–834, 76 Stat. 960

== Constitutional amendments ==
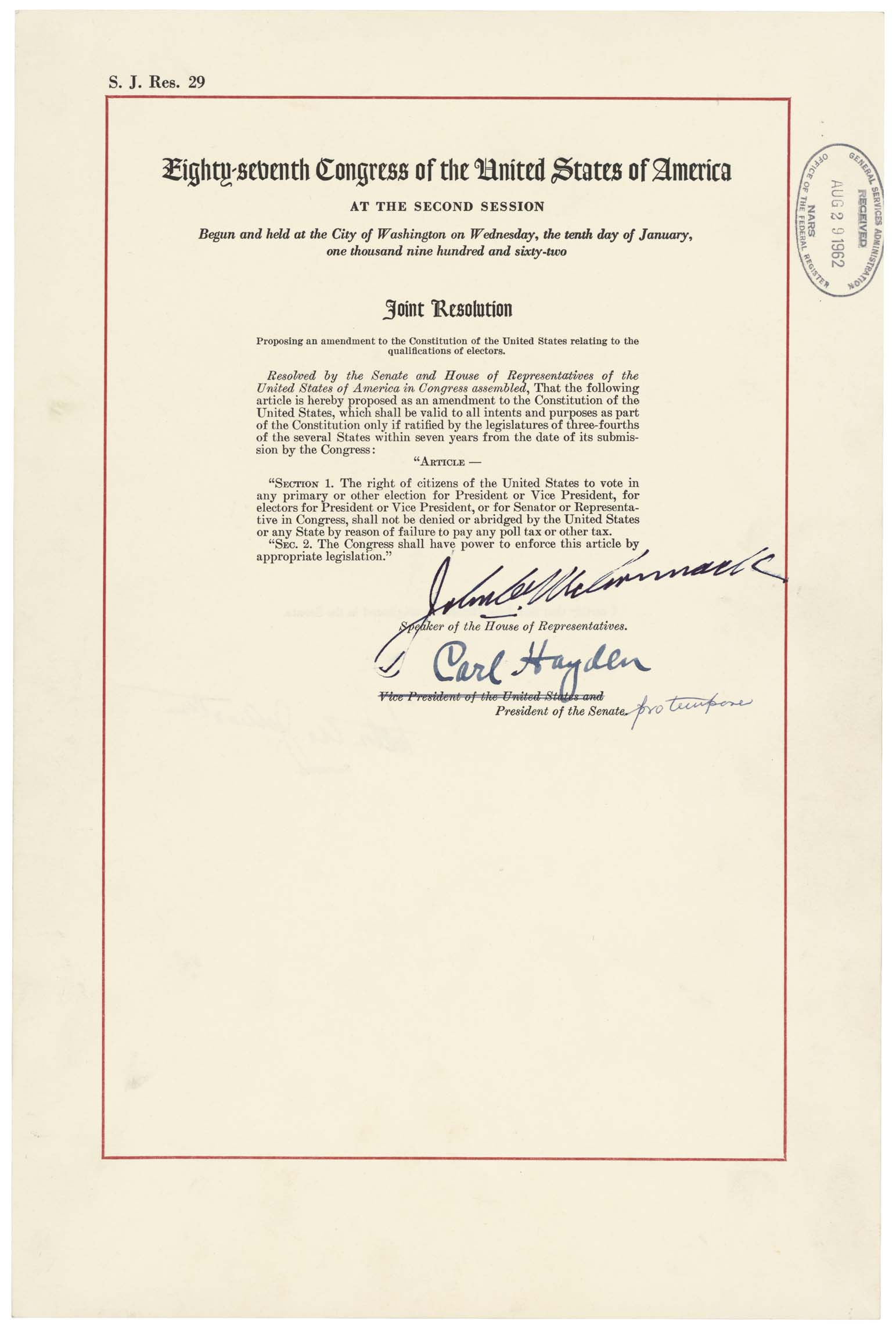
The official Joint Resolution of Congress proposing what became the 24th Amendment as contained in the National Archives

- March 29, 1961: Twenty-third Amendment ratified, extending the right to vote in the presidential election to citizens residing in the District of Columbia by granting the District electors in the Electoral College, as if it were a state.
- August 27, 1962: Twenty-fourth Amendment approved by Congress and sent to the states for consideration. It would prohibit both Congress and the states from conditioning the right to vote in federal elections on payment of a poll tax or other types of tax. The amendment was later ratified on January 23, 1964.

== Party summary ==
=== Senate ===
	Party (shading shows control)		Total	Vacant
	Democratic (D)	Republican (R)	Total	Vacant
End of previous congress	66	34	100	0
Begin	65	35	100	0
End	62	37	99	1
Final voting share	62.6%	37.4%		
Beginning of next congress	65	33	98	2

=== House of Representatives ===
	Party (shading shows control)		Total	Vacant
	Democratic (D)	Republican (R)	Total	Vacant
End of previous congress	281	151	432	5
Begin	263	174	437	0
End	260	174	434	3
Final voting share	59.9%	40.1%		
Beginning of next congress	258	176	434	1

== Leadership ==
Senate President

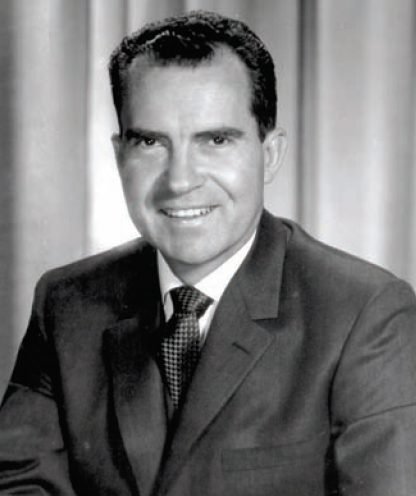
Richard Nixon (R)
Until January 20, 1961

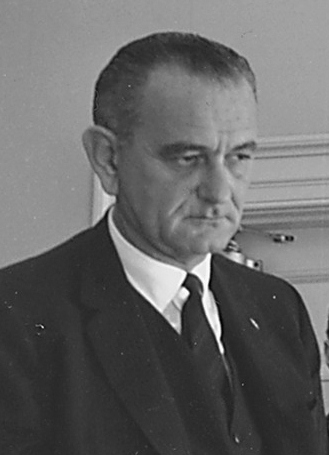
Lyndon B. Johnson (D)
From January 20, 1961

Senate President pro tempore

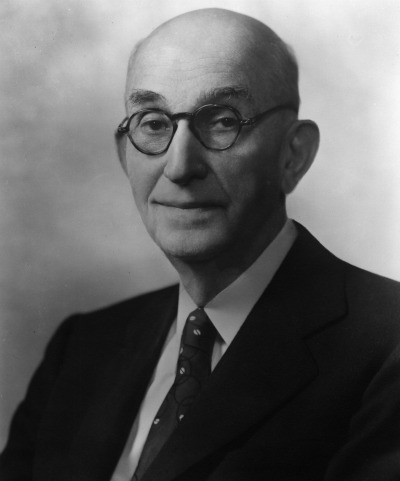
Carl Hayden (D)

=== Senate ===
- President: Richard Nixon (R), until January 20, 1961
  - Lyndon B. Johnson (D), from January 20, 1961
- President pro tempore: Carl Hayden (D)

==== Majority (Democratic) leadership ====
- Majority Leader: Mike Mansfield
- Majority Whip: Hubert Humphrey
- Democratic Caucus Secretary: George Smathers

==== Minority (Republican) leadership ====
- Minority Leader: Everett Dirksen
- Minority Whip: Thomas Kuchel
- Republican Conference Chairman: Leverett Saltonstall
- Republican Conference Secretary: Milton Young
- National Senatorial Committee Chair: Barry Goldwater
- Policy Committee Chairman: Styles Bridges (until November 26, 1961)
  - Bourke B. Hickenlooper (from January 3, 1962)

=== House of Representatives ===
House Speaker

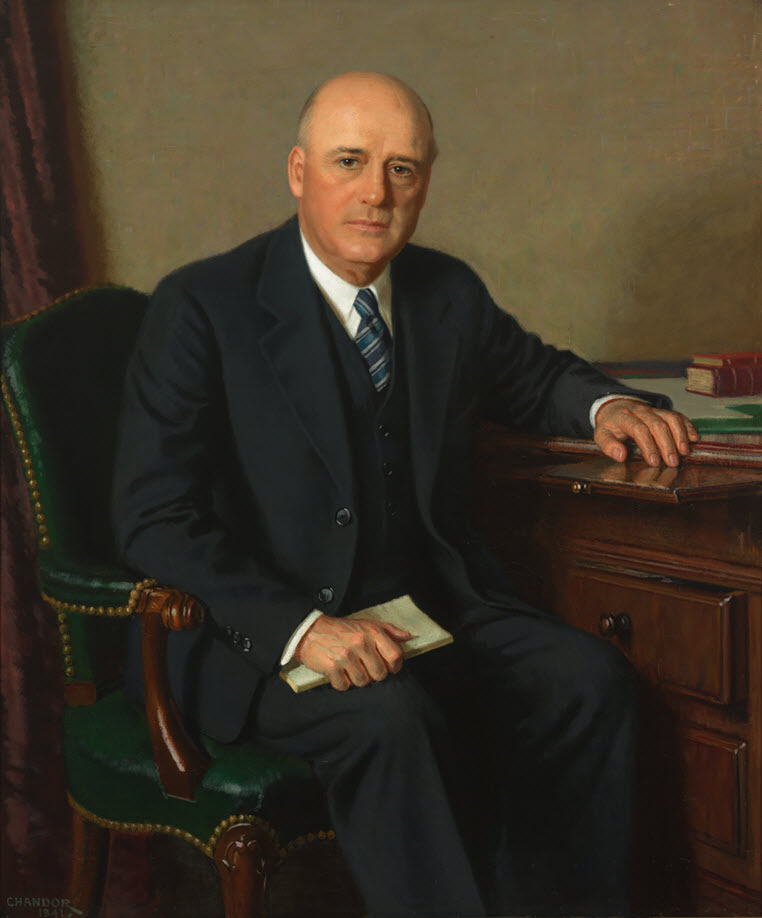
Sam Rayburn (D)
Until November 16, 1961
(1st session)

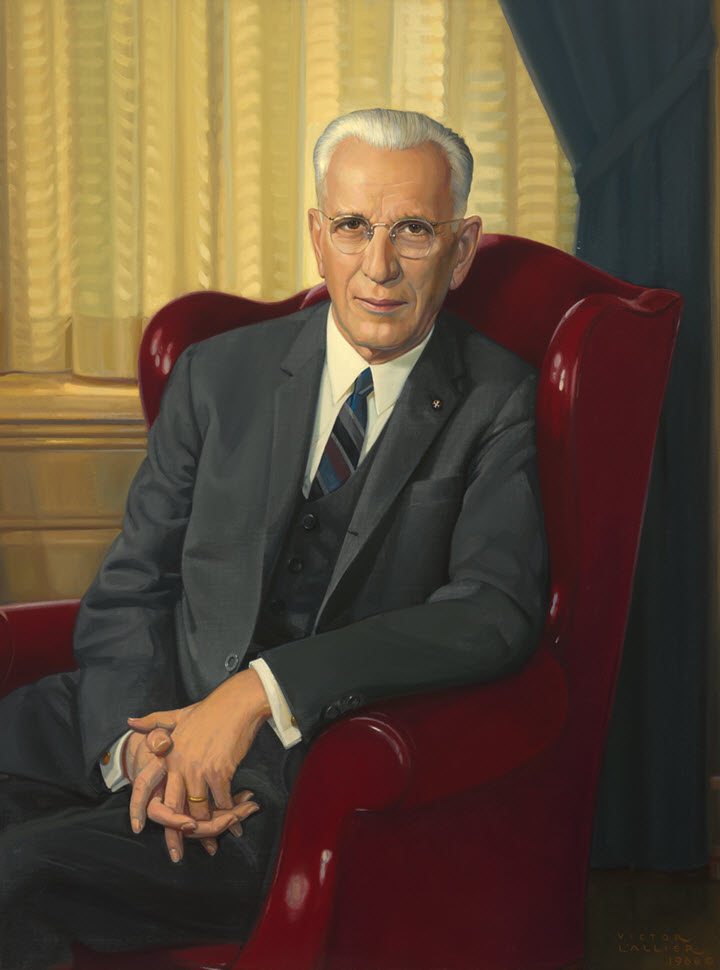
John W. McCormack (D)
From January 10, 1962
(2nd session)

- Speaker: Sam Rayburn (D), until November 16, 1961
  - John W. McCormack (D), from January 10, 1962

==== Majority (Democratic) leadership ====
- Majority Leader: John W. McCormack until January 10, 1962
  - Carl Albert, from January 10, 1962
- Majority Whip: Carl Albert, until January 10, 1962
  - Hale Boggs, from January 10, 1962
- Democratic Caucus Chairman: Francis E. Walter
- Democratic Caucus Secretary: Leonor Sullivan
- Democratic Campaign Committee Chairman: Michael J. Kirwan

==== Minority (Republican) leadership ====
- Minority Leader: Charles A. Halleck
- Minority Whip: Leslie C. Arends
- Republican Conference Chairman: Charles B. Hoeven
- Policy Committee Chairman: John W. Byrnes
- Republican Campaign Committee Chairman: Bob Wilson

== Caucuses ==
- House Democratic Caucus
- Senate Democratic Caucus

== Members ==
=== Senate ===
Senators are popularly elected statewide every two years, with one-third beginning new six-year terms with each Congress. Preceding the names in the list below are Senate class numbers, which indicate the cycle of their election, In this Congress, Class 3 meant their term ended with this Congress, requiring re-election in 1962; Class 1 meant their term began in the last Congress, requiring re-election in 1964; and Class 2 meant their term began in this Congress, requiring re-election in 1966.

Currently, this is the last congressional session in which the Democratic Party commanded all Senate seats from the Deep South, a unity broken when a Republican defeated the appointed successor to Lyndon Johnson's seat in a 1961 Senate special election.

==== Alabama ====
▌2. John J. Sparkman (D)
▌3. J. Lister Hill (D)

==== Alaska ====
▌2. Bob Bartlett (D)
▌3. Ernest Gruening (D)

==== Arizona ====
▌1. Barry Goldwater (R)
▌3. Carl Hayden (D)

==== Arkansas ====
▌2. John L. McClellan (D)
▌3. J. William Fulbright (D)

==== California ====
▌1. Clair Engle (D)
▌3. Thomas Kuchel (R)

==== Colorado ====
▌2. Gordon Allott (R)
▌3. John A. Carroll (D)

==== Connecticut ====
▌1. Thomas J. Dodd (D)
▌3. Prescott Bush (R)

==== Delaware ====
▌1. John J. Williams (R)
▌2. J. Caleb Boggs (R)

==== Florida ====
▌1. Spessard Holland (D)
▌3. George Smathers (D)

==== Georgia ====
▌2. Richard Russell Jr. (D)
▌3. Herman Talmadge (D)

==== Hawaii ====
▌1. Hiram Fong (R)
▌2. Oren E. Long (D)

==== Idaho ====
▌2. Henry Dworshak (R), until July 23, 1962

▌Len Jordan (R), from August 6, 1962

▌3. Frank Church (D)

==== Illinois ====
▌2. Paul Douglas (D)
▌3. Everett M. Dirksen (R)

==== Indiana ====
▌1. Vance Hartke (D)
▌3. Homer E. Capehart (R)

==== Iowa ====
▌2. Jack Miller (R)
▌3. Bourke B. Hickenlooper (R)

==== Kansas ====
▌2. Andrew Frank Schoeppel (R), until January 21, 1962

▌James B. Pearson (R), from January 31, 1962

▌3. Frank Carlson (R)

==== Kentucky ====
▌2. John Sherman Cooper (R)
▌3. Thruston Ballard Morton (R)

==== Louisiana ====
▌2. Allen J. Ellender (D)
▌3. Russell B. Long (D)

==== Maine ====
▌1. Edmund Muskie (D)
▌2. Margaret Chase Smith (R)

==== Maryland ====
▌1. James Glenn Beall (R)
▌3. John Marshall Butler (R)

==== Massachusetts ====
▌1. Benjamin A. Smith II (D), until November 6, 1962

▌Ted Kennedy (D), from November 7, 1962

▌2. Leverett Saltonstall (R)

==== Michigan ====
▌1. Philip Hart (D)
▌2. Patrick V. McNamara (D)

==== Minnesota ====
▌1. Eugene McCarthy (DFL) (Note: The Minnesota Democratic–Farmer–Labor Party (DFL) and the North Dakota Democratic-Nonpartisan League Party (D-NPL) are the Minnesota and North Dakota affiliates of the U.S. Democratic Party and are counted as Democrats.)
▌2. Hubert Humphrey (DFL)

==== Mississippi ====
▌1. John C. Stennis (D)
▌2. James Eastland (D)

==== Missouri ====
▌1. Stuart Symington (D)
▌3. Edward V. Long (D)

==== Montana ====
▌1. Mike Mansfield (D)
▌2. Lee Metcalf (D)

==== Nebraska ====
▌1. Roman Hruska (R)
▌2. Carl Curtis (R)

==== Nevada ====
▌1. Howard Cannon (D)
▌3. Alan Bible (D)

==== New Hampshire ====
▌2. Styles Bridges (R), until November 26, 1961

▌Maurice J. Murphy Jr. (R), from January 10, 1962 - November 6, 1962
▌Thomas J. McIntyre (D), from November 7, 1962

▌3. Norris Cotton (R)

==== New Jersey ====
▌2. Clifford P. Case (R)
▌1. Harrison A. Williams (D)

==== New Mexico ====
▌1. Dennis Chávez (D), until November 18, 1962

▌Edwin L. Mechem (R), from November 30, 1962

▌2. Clinton P. Anderson (D)

==== New York ====
▌1. Kenneth Keating (R)
▌3. Jacob Javits (R)

==== North Carolina ====
▌2. B. Everett Jordan (D)
▌3. Sam Ervin (D)

==== North Dakota ====
▌1. Quentin Burdick (D-NPL)
▌3. Milton Young (R)

==== Ohio ====
▌1. Stephen M. Young (D)
▌3. Frank Lausche (D)

==== Oklahoma ====
▌2. Robert S. Kerr (D), until January 1, 1963, vacant thereafter
▌3. A. S. Mike Monroney (D)

==== Oregon ====
▌2. Maurine Neuberger (D)
▌3. Wayne Morse (D)

==== Pennsylvania ====
▌1. Hugh Scott (R)
▌3. Joseph S. Clark Jr. (D)

==== Rhode Island ====
▌1. John Pastore (D)
▌2. Claiborne Pell (D)

==== South Carolina ====
▌2. Strom Thurmond (D)
▌3. Olin D. Johnston (D)

==== South Dakota ====
▌2. Karl E. Mundt (R)
▌3. Francis Case (R), until June 23, 1962

▌Joseph H. Bottum (R), from July 9, 1962

==== Tennessee ====
▌1. Albert Gore Sr. (D)
▌2. Estes Kefauver (D)

==== Texas ====
▌1. Ralph Yarborough (D)
▌2. Lyndon B. Johnson (D), until January 3, 1961

▌William A. Blakley (D), until June 14, 1961
▌John Tower (R), from June 15, 1961

==== Utah ====
▌1. Frank Moss (D)
▌3. Wallace F. Bennett (R)

==== Vermont ====
▌1. Winston L. Prouty (R)
▌3. George Aiken (R)

==== Virginia ====
▌1. Harry F. Byrd (D)
▌2. A. Willis Robertson (D)

==== Washington ====
▌1. Henry M. Jackson (D)
▌3. Warren G. Magnuson (D)

==== West Virginia ====
▌1. Robert Byrd (D)
▌2. Jennings Randolph (D)

==== Wisconsin ====
▌1. William Proxmire (D)
▌3. Alexander Wiley (R)

==== Wyoming ====
▌1. Gale W. McGee (D)
▌2. John J. Hickey (D), (Note: In Wyoming, Senator-elect Edwin Keith Thomson (R) died December 9, 1960, before the term started.) until November 6, 1962

▌Milward Simpson (R), from November 6, 1962

Senators' party membership by state at the opening of the 87th Congress in January 1961 2 Democrats 1 Democrat and 1 Republican 2 Republicans

=== House of Representatives ===
The names of representatives are preceded by their district numbers.

==== Alabama ====
▌1. Frank W. Boykin (D)
▌2. George M. Grant (D)
▌3. George W. Andrews (D)
▌4. Kenneth A. Roberts (D)
▌5. Albert Rains (D)
▌6. Armistead I. Selden Jr. (D)
▌7. Carl Elliott (D)
▌8. Robert E. Jones Jr. (D)
▌9. George Huddleston Jr. (D)

==== Alaska ====
▌At-large. Ralph Julian Rivers (D)

==== Arizona ====
▌1. John Jacob Rhodes (R)
▌2. Stewart Udall (D), until January 18, 1961

▌Mo Udall (D), from May 2, 1961

==== Arkansas ====
▌1. Ezekiel C. Gathings (D)
▌2. Wilbur Mills (D)
▌3. James William Trimble (D)
▌4. Oren Harris (D)
▌5. Dale Alford (D)
▌6. William F. Norrell (D), until February 15, 1961

▌Catherine Dorris Norrell (D), from April 18, 1961

==== California ====
▌1. Clement Woodnutt Miller (D), until October 7, 1962
▌2. Harold T. Johnson (D)
▌3. John E. Moss (D)
▌4. William S. Mailliard (R)
▌5. John F. Shelley (D)
▌6. John F. Baldwin Jr. (R)
▌7. Jeffery Cohelan (D)
▌8. George P. Miller (D)
▌9. J. Arthur Younger (R)
▌10. Charles Gubser (R)
▌11. John J. McFall (D)
▌12. B. F. Sisk (D)
▌13. Charles M. Teague (R)
▌14. Harlan Hagen (D)
▌15. Gordon L. McDonough (R)
▌16. Alphonzo E. Bell Jr. (R)
▌17. Cecil R. King (D)
▌18. Craig Hosmer (R)
▌19. Chet Holifield (D)
▌20. H. Allen Smith (R)
▌21. Edgar W. Hiestand (R)
▌22. James C. Corman (D)
▌23. Clyde Doyle (D)
▌24. Glenard P. Lipscomb (R)
▌25. John H. Rousselot (R)
▌26. James Roosevelt (D)
▌27. Harry R. Sheppard (D)
▌28. James B. Utt (R)
▌29. Dalip Singh Saund (D)
▌30. Bob Wilson (R)

==== Colorado ====
▌1. Byron G. Rogers (D)
▌2. Peter H. Dominick (R)
▌3. John Chenoweth (R)
▌4. Wayne N. Aspinall (D)

==== Connecticut ====
▌1. Emilio Q. Daddario (D)
▌2. Horace Seely-Brown Jr. (R)
▌3. Robert Giaimo (D)
▌4. Abner W. Sibal (R)
▌5. John S. Monagan (D)
▌At-large. Frank Kowalski (D)

==== Delaware ====
▌At-large. Harris McDowell (D)

==== Florida ====
▌1. William C. Cramer (R)
▌2. Charles E. Bennett (D)
▌3. Robert L. F. Sikes (D)
▌4. Dante Fascell (D)
▌5. Syd Herlong (D)
▌6. Paul Rogers (D)
▌7. James A. Haley (D)
▌8. Donald Ray Matthews (D)

==== Georgia ====
▌1. George Elliott Hagan (D)
▌2. J. L. Pilcher (D)
▌3. Tic Forrester (D)
▌4. John Flynt (D)
▌5. James C. Davis (D)
▌6. Carl Vinson (D)
▌7. John William Davis (D)
▌8. Iris Faircloth Blitch (D)
▌9. Phillip M. Landrum (D)
▌10. Robert Grier Stephens Jr. (D)

==== Hawaii ====
▌At-large. Daniel Inouye (D)

==== Idaho ====
▌1. Gracie Pfost (D)
▌2. Ralph R. Harding (D)

==== Illinois ====
▌1. William L. Dawson (D)
▌2. Barratt O'Hara (D)
▌3. William T. Murphy (D)
▌4. Ed Derwinski (R)
▌5. John C. Kluczynski (D)
▌6. Thomas J. O'Brien (D)
▌7. Roland V. Libonati (D)
▌8. Dan Rostenkowski (D)
▌9. Sidney R. Yates (D)
▌10. Harold R. Collier (R)
▌11. Roman Pucinski (D)
▌12. Edward Rowan Finnegan (D)
▌13. Marguerite S. Church (R)
▌14. Elmer J. Hoffman (R)
▌15. Noah M. Mason (R)
▌16. John B. Anderson (R)
▌17. Leslie C. Arends (R)
▌18. Robert H. Michel (R)
▌19. Robert B. Chiperfield (R)
▌20. Paul Findley (R)
▌21. Peter F. Mack Jr. (D)
▌22. William L. Springer (R)
▌23. George E. Shipley (D)
▌24. Melvin Price (D)
▌25. Kenneth J. Gray (D)

==== Indiana ====
▌1. Ray Madden (D)
▌2. Charles A. Halleck (R)
▌3. John Brademas (D)
▌4. E. Ross Adair (R)
▌5. J. Edward Roush (D)
▌6. Richard L. Roudebush (R)
▌7. William G. Bray (R)
▌8. Winfield K. Denton (D)
▌9. Earl Wilson (R)
▌10. Ralph Harvey (R)
▌11. Donald C. Bruce (R)

==== Iowa ====
▌1. Fred Schwengel (R)
▌2. James E. Bromwell (R)
▌3. H. R. Gross (R)
▌4. John Henry Kyl (R)
▌5. Neal Edward Smith (D)
▌6. Merwin Coad (D)
▌7. Ben F. Jensen (R)
▌8. Charles B. Hoeven (R)

==== Kansas ====
▌1. William H. Avery (R)
▌2. Robert Ellsworth (R)
▌3. Walter Lewis McVey Jr. (R)
▌4. Garner E. Shriver (R)
▌5. James Floyd Breeding (D)
▌6. Bob Dole (R)

==== Kentucky ====
▌1. Frank Stubblefield (D)
▌2. William Natcher (D)
▌3. Frank W. Burke (D)
▌4. Frank Chelf (D)
▌5. Brent Spence (D)
▌6. John C. Watts (D)
▌7. Carl D. Perkins (D)
▌8. Eugene Siler (R)

==== Louisiana ====
▌1. F. Edward Hébert (D)
▌2. Hale Boggs (D)
▌3. Edwin E. Willis (D)
▌4. Overton Brooks (D), until September 16, 1961

▌Joe Waggonner (D), from December 19, 1961

▌5. Otto Passman (D)
▌6. James H. Morrison (D)
▌7. T. Ashton Thompson (D)
▌8. Harold B. McSween (D)

==== Maine ====
▌1. Peter A. Garland (R)
▌2. Stanley R. Tupper (R)
▌3. Clifford McIntire (R)

==== Maryland ====
▌1. Thomas F. Johnson (D)
▌2. Daniel Brewster (D)
▌3. Edward Garmatz (D)
▌4. George Hyde Fallon (D)
▌5. Richard Lankford (D)
▌6. Charles Mathias (R)
▌7. Samuel Friedel (D)

==== Massachusetts ====
▌1. Silvio O. Conte (R)
▌2. Edward Boland (D)
▌3. Philip J. Philbin (D)
▌4. Harold Donohue (D)
▌5. F. Bradford Morse (R)
▌6. William H. Bates (R)
▌7. Thomas J. Lane (D)
▌8. Torbert Macdonald (D)
▌9. Hastings Keith (R)
▌10. Laurence Curtis (R)
▌11. Tip O'Neill (D)
▌12. John W. McCormack (D)
▌13. James A. Burke (D)
▌14. Joseph W. Martin Jr. (R)

==== Michigan ====
▌1. Thaddeus M. Machrowicz (D), until September 18, 1961

▌Lucien Nedzi (D), from November 7, 1961

▌2. George Meader (R)
▌3. August E. Johansen (R)
▌4. Clare E. Hoffman (R)
▌5. Gerald Ford (R)
▌6. Charles E. Chamberlain (R)
▌7. James G. O'Hara (D)
▌8. R. James Harvey (R)
▌9. Robert P. Griffin (R)
▌10. Elford Albin Cederberg (R)
▌11. Victor A. Knox (R)
▌12. John B. Bennett (R)
▌13. Charles Diggs (D)
▌14. Louis C. Rabaut (D), until November 12, 1961

▌Harold M. Ryan (D), from February 13, 1962

▌15. John D. Dingell Jr. (D)
▌16. John Lesinski Jr. (D)
▌17. Martha Griffiths (D)
▌18. William Broomfield (R)

==== Minnesota ====
▌1. Al Quie (R)
▌2. Ancher Nelsen (R)
▌3. Clark MacGregor (R)
▌4. Joseph Karth (DFL)
▌5. Walter Judd (R)
▌6. Fred Marshall (DFL)
▌7. Herman Carl Andersen (R)
▌8. John Blatnik (DFL)
▌9. Odin Langen (R)

==== Mississippi ====
▌1. Thomas Abernethy (D)
▌2. Jamie L. Whitten (D)
▌3. Frank Ellis Smith (D), until November 14, 1962
▌4. John Bell Williams (D)
▌5. W. Arthur Winstead (D)
▌6. William M. Colmer (D)

==== Missouri ====
▌1. Frank M. Karsten (D)
▌2. Thomas B. Curtis (R)
▌3. Leonor Sullivan (D)
▌4. William J. Randall (D)
▌5. Richard Walker Bolling (D)
▌6. William Raleigh Hull Jr. (D)
▌7. Durward Gorham Hall (R)
▌8. Richard Howard Ichord Jr. (D)
▌9. Clarence Cannon (D)
▌10. Paul C. Jones (D)
▌11. Morgan M. Moulder (D)

==== Montana ====
▌1. Arnold Olsen (D)
▌2. James F. Battin (R)

==== Nebraska ====
▌1. Phillip Hart Weaver (R)
▌2. Glenn Cunningham (R)
▌3. Ralph F. Beermann (R)
▌4. David Martin (R)

==== Nevada ====
▌At-large. Walter S. Baring Jr. (D)

==== New Hampshire ====
▌1. Chester Earl Merrow (R)
▌2. Perkins Bass (R)

==== New Jersey ====
▌1. William T. Cahill (R)
▌2. Milton W. Glenn (R)
▌3. James C. Auchincloss (R)
▌4. Frank Thompson (D)
▌5. Peter Frelinghuysen Jr. (R)
▌6. Florence P. Dwyer (R)
▌7. William B. Widnall (R)
▌8. Charles Samuel Joelson (D)
▌9. Frank C. Osmers Jr. (R)
▌10. Peter W. Rodino (D)
▌11. Hugh Joseph Addonizio (D), until June 30, 1962
▌12. George M. Wallhauser (R)
▌13. Cornelius Gallagher (D)
▌14. Dominick V. Daniels (D)

==== New Mexico ====
▌At-large. Thomas G. Morris (D)
▌At-large. Joseph Montoya (D)

==== New York ====
▌1. Otis G. Pike (D)
▌2. Steven Derounian (R)
▌3. Frank J. Becker (R)
▌4. Seymour Halpern (R)
▌5. Joseph P. Addabbo (D)
▌6. Lester Holtzman (D), until December 31, 1961

▌Benjamin Stanley Rosenthal (D), from February 20, 1962

▌7. James J. Delaney (D)
▌8. Victor Anfuso (D)
▌9. Eugene J. Keogh (D)
▌10. Edna F. Kelly (D)
▌11. Emanuel Celler (D)
▌12. Hugh Carey (D)
▌13. Abraham J. Multer (D)
▌14. John J. Rooney (D)
▌15. John H. Ray (R)
▌16. Adam Clayton Powell Jr. (D)
▌17. John Lindsay (R)
▌18. Alfred E. Santangelo (D)
▌19. Leonard Farbstein (D)
▌20. William Fitts Ryan (D)
▌21. Herbert Zelenko (D)
▌22. James C. Healey (D)
▌23. Jacob H. Gilbert (D)
▌24. Charles A. Buckley (D)
▌25. Paul A. Fino (R)
▌26. Edwin B. Dooley (R)
▌27. Robert R. Barry (R)
▌28. Katharine St. George (R)
▌29. J. Ernest Wharton (R)
▌30. Leo W. O'Brien (D)
▌31. Carleton J. King (R)
▌32. Samuel S. Stratton (D)
▌33. Clarence E. Kilburn (R)
▌34. Alexander Pirnie (R)
▌35. R. Walter Riehlman (R)
▌36. John Taber (R)
▌37. Howard W. Robison (R)
▌38. Jessica M. Weis (R)
▌39. Harold C. Ostertag (R)
▌40. William E. Miller (R)
▌41. Thaddeus J. Dulski (D)
▌42. John R. Pillion (R)
▌43. Charles Goodell (R)

==== North Carolina ====
▌1. Herbert Covington Bonner (D)
▌2. Lawrence H. Fountain (D)
▌3. David N. Henderson (D)
▌4. Harold D. Cooley (D)
▌5. Ralph James Scott (D)
▌6. Horace R. Kornegay (D)
▌7. Alton Lennon (D)
▌8. Alvin Paul Kitchin (D)
▌9. Hugh Quincy Alexander (D)
▌10. Charles R. Jonas (R)
▌11. Basil Lee Whitener (D)
▌12. Roy A. Taylor (D)

==== North Dakota ====
▌At-large. Don L. Short (R)
▌At-large. Hjalmar Carl Nygaard (R)

==== Ohio ====
▌1. Gordon H. Scherer (R)
▌2. Donald D. Clancy (R)
▌3. Paul F. Schenck (R)
▌4. William Moore McCulloch (R)
▌5. Del Latta (R)
▌6. Bill Harsha (R)
▌7. Clarence J. Brown (R)
▌8. Jackson Edward Betts (R)
▌9. Thomas L. Ashley (D)
▌10. Walter H. Moeller (D)
▌11. Robert E. Cook (D)
▌12. Samuel L. Devine (R)
▌13. Charles Adams Mosher (R)
▌14. William Hanes Ayres (R)
▌15. Tom Van Horn Moorehead (R)
▌16. Frank T. Bow (R)
▌17. John M. Ashbrook (R)
▌18. Wayne Hays (D)
▌19. Michael J. Kirwan (D)
▌20. Michael A. Feighan (D)
▌21. Charles Vanik (D)
▌22. Frances P. Bolton (R)
▌23. William Edwin Minshall Jr. (R)

==== Oklahoma ====
▌1. Page Belcher (R)
▌2. Ed Edmondson (D)
▌3. Carl Albert (D)
▌4. Tom Steed (D)
▌5. John Jarman (D)
▌6. Victor Wickersham (D)

==== Oregon ====
▌1. A. Walter Norblad (R)
▌2. Al Ullman (D)
▌3. Edith Green (D)
▌4. Edwin Durno (R)

==== Pennsylvania ====
▌1. William A. Barrett (D)
▌2. Kathryn E. Granahan (D)
▌3. James A. Byrne (D)
▌4. Robert N. C. Nix Sr. (D)
▌5. William J. Green Jr. (D)
▌6. Herman Toll (D)
▌7. William H. Milliken Jr. (R)
▌8. Willard S. Curtin (R)
▌9. Paul B. Dague (R)
▌10. William Scranton (R)
▌11. Dan Flood (D)
▌12. Ivor D. Fenton (R)
▌13. Richard Schweiker (R)
▌14. George M. Rhodes (D)
▌15. Francis E. Walter (D)
▌16. Walter M. Mumma (R), until February 25, 1961

▌John C. Kunkel (R), from May 16, 1961

▌17. Herman T. Schneebeli (R)
▌18. J. Irving Whalley (R)
▌19. George Atlee Goodling (R)
▌20. James E. Van Zandt (R)
▌21. John Herman Dent (D)
▌22. John P. Saylor (R)
▌23. Leon H. Gavin (R)
▌24. Carroll D. Kearns (R)
▌25. Frank M. Clark (D)
▌26. Thomas E. Morgan (D)
▌27. James G. Fulton (R)
▌28. William S. Moorhead (D)
▌29. Robert J. Corbett (R)
▌30. Elmer J. Holland (D)

==== Rhode Island ====
▌1. Fernand St Germain (D)
▌2. John E. Fogarty (D)

==== South Carolina ====
▌1. L. Mendel Rivers (D)
▌2. John J. Riley (D), until January 1, 1962

▌Corinne Boyd Riley (D), from April 10, 1962

▌3. William Jennings Bryan Dorn (D)
▌4. Robert T. Ashmore (D)
▌5. Robert W. Hemphill (D)
▌6. John L. McMillan (D)

==== South Dakota ====
▌1. Ben Reifel (R)
▌2. Ellis Yarnal Berry (R)

==== Tennessee ====
▌1. B. Carroll Reece (R), until March 19, 1961

▌Louise Goff Reece (R), from May 16, 1961

▌2. Howard Baker Sr. (R)
▌3. James B. Frazier Jr. (D)
▌4. Joe L. Evins (D)
▌5. Joseph Carlton Loser (D)
▌6. Ross Bass (D)
▌7. Tom J. Murray (D)
▌8. Fats Everett (D)
▌9. Clifford Davis (D)

==== Texas ====
▌1. Wright Patman (D)
▌2. Jack Brooks (D)
▌3. Lindley Beckworth (D)
▌4. Sam Rayburn (D), until November 16, 1961

▌Ray Roberts (D), from January 30, 1962

▌5. Bruce Alger (R)
▌6. Olin E. Teague (D)
▌7. John Dowdy (D)
▌8. Albert Thomas (D)
▌9. Clark W. Thompson (D)
▌10. Homer Thornberry (D)
▌11. William R. Poage (D)
▌12. Jim Wright (D)
▌13. Frank N. Ikard (D), until December 15, 1961

▌Graham B. Purcell Jr. (D), from January 27, 1962

▌14. John Andrew Young (D)
▌15. Joe M. Kilgore (D)
▌16. J. T. Rutherford (D)
▌17. Omar Burleson (D)
▌18. Walter E. Rogers (D)
▌19. George H. Mahon (D)
▌20. Paul J. Kilday (D), until September 24, 1961

▌Henry B. González (D), from November 4, 1961

▌21. O. C. Fisher (D)
▌22. Robert R. Casey (D)

==== Utah ====
▌1. M. Blaine Peterson (D)
▌2. David S. King (D)

==== Vermont ====
▌At-large. Robert Stafford (R)

==== Virginia ====
▌1. Thomas N. Downing (D)
▌2. Porter Hardy Jr. (D)
▌3. J. Vaughan Gary (D)
▌4. Watkins Moorman Abbitt (D)
▌5. William M. Tuck (D)
▌6. Richard Harding Poff (R)
▌7. Burr Harrison (D)
▌8. Howard W. Smith (D)
▌9. W. Pat Jennings (D)
▌10. Joel Broyhill (R)

==== Washington ====
▌1. Thomas Pelly (R)
▌2. Jack Westland (R)
▌3. Julia Butler Hansen (D)
▌4. Catherine Dean May (R)
▌5. Walt Horan (R)
▌6. Thor C. Tollefson (R)
▌7. Donald H. Magnuson (D)

==== West Virginia ====
▌1. Arch A. Moore Jr. (R)
▌2. Harley Orrin Staggers (D)
▌3. Cleveland M. Bailey (D)
▌4. Ken Hechler (D)
▌5. Elizabeth Kee (D)
▌6. John M. Slack Jr. (D)

==== Wisconsin ====
▌1. Henry C. Schadeberg (R)
▌2. Robert Kastenmeier (D)
▌3. Vernon Wallace Thomson (R)
▌4. Clement J. Zablocki (D)
▌5. Henry S. Reuss (D)
▌6. William Van Pelt (R)
▌7. Melvin Laird (R)
▌8. John W. Byrnes (R)
▌9. Lester Johnson (D)
▌10. Alvin O'Konski (R)

==== Wyoming ====
▌At-large. William Henry Harrison III (R)

==== Non-voting members ====
▌Puerto Rico. Antonio Fernós-Isern (Resident Commissioner) (PPD)

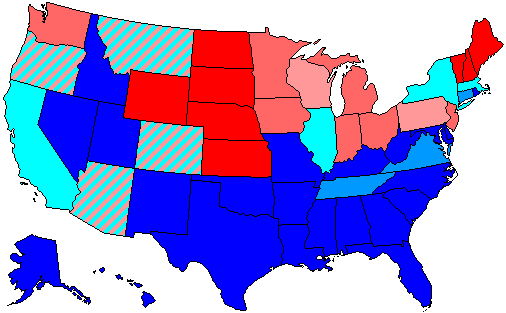
House seats by party holding plurality in state: 80+% Democratic / 80+% Republican; 60+% to 80% Democratic / 60+% to 80% Republican; Up to 60% Democratic / Up to 60% Republican

== Changes in membership ==
=== Senate ===
Senate changes
State (class)	Vacated by	Reason for change	Successor	Date of successor's formal installation (Note: When seated or oath administered, not necessarily when service began.)
Texas (2)	William A. Blakley (D)	Lost special election. Successor elected June 14, 1961.	John Tower (R)	June 15, 1961
New Hampshire (2)	Styles Bridges (R)	Died November 26, 1961. Successor appointed December 7, 1961.	Maurice J. Murphy Jr. (R)	December 7, 1961
Kansas (2)	Andrew Frank Schoeppel (R)	Died January 21, 1962. Successor appointed January 31, 1962, and then elected November 6, 1962.	James B. Pearson (R)	January 31, 1962
South Dakota (3)	Francis H. Case (R)	Died June 23, 1962. Successor appointed July 9, 1962 to finish the term.	Joseph H. Bottum (R)	July 9, 1962
Idaho (2)	Henry Dworshak (R)	Died July 23, 1962. Successor appointed August 6, 1962, and then elected November 6, 1962.	Len Jordan (R)	August 6, 1962
Wyoming (2)	John J. Hickey (D)	Lost special election. Successor elected November 6, 1962.	Milward Simpson (R)	November 6, 1962
Massachusetts (1)	Benjamin A. Smith II (D)	Successor elected November 6, 1962.	Ted Kennedy (D)	November 7, 1962
New Hampshire (2)	Maurice J. Murphy Jr. (R)	Lost special election. Successor elected November 6, 1962.	Thomas J. McIntyre (D)	November 7, 1962
New Mexico (1)	Dennis Chávez (D)	Died November 18, 1962. Successor appointed November 30, 1962 to continue the term.	Edwin L. Mechem (R)	November 30, 1962
Oklahoma (2)	Robert S. Kerr (D)	Died January 1, 1963.	Vacant	Not filled this term

=== House of Representatives ===
House changes
District	Vacated by	Reason for change	Successor	Date of successor's formal installation
Arizona 2nd	Stewart Udall (D)	Resigned January 18, 1961 to become United States Secretary of the Interior.	Mo Udall (D)	May 2, 1961
Arkansas 6th	William F. Norrell (D)	Died February 15, 1961.	Catherine Dorris Norrell (D)	April 18, 1961
Indiana 5th	George O. Chambers (R)	Replaced in house recount	J. Edward Roush (D)	June, 1961
Pennsylvania 16th	Walter M. Mumma (R)	Died February 25, 1961.	John C. Kunkel (R)	May 16, 1961
Tennessee 1st	B. Carroll Reece (R)	Died March 19, 1961.	Louise Goff Reece (R)	May 16, 1961
Louisiana 4th	Overton Brooks (D)	Died September 16, 1961.	Joe Waggonner (D)	December 19, 1961
Michigan 1st	Thaddeus M. Machrowicz (D)	Resigned September 18, 1961 to become judge of the United States District Court for the Eastern District of Michigan.	Lucien Nedzi (D)	November 7, 1961
Texas 20th	Paul J. Kilday (D)	Resigned September 24, 1961 to become judge of United States Court of Appeals for the Armed Forces.	Henry B. González (D)	November 4, 1961
Michigan 14th	Louis C. Rabaut (D)	Died November 12, 1961.	Harold M. Ryan (D)	February 13, 1962
Texas 4th	Sam Rayburn (D)	Died November 16, 1961.	Ray Roberts (D)	January 30, 1962
Texas 13th	Frank N. Ikard (D)	Resigned December 15, 1961.	Graham B. Purcell Jr. (D)	January 27, 1962
New York 6th	Lester Holtzman (D)	Resigned December 31, 1961 to become judge of the New York Supreme Court.	Benjamin Stanley Rosenthal (D)	February 20, 1962
South Carolina 2nd	John J. Riley (D)	Died January 1, 1962.	Corinne Boyd Riley (D)	April 10, 1962
New Jersey 11th	Hugh Joseph Addonizio (D)	Resigned June 30, 1962 to become Mayor of Newark, New Jersey.	Vacant	Not filled this term
California 1st	Clement Woodnutt Miller (D)	Died October 7, 1962.	Vacant	Not filled this term
Mississippi 3rd	Frank Ellis Smith (D)	Resigned November 14, 1962.	Vacant	Not filled this term

== Committees ==
Lists of committees and their party leaders for members of the House and Senate committees can be found through the Official Congressional Directory at the bottom of this article. The directory after the pages of terms of service lists committees of the Senate, House (Standing with Subcommittees, Select and Special) and Joint and, after that, House/Senate committee assignments. On the committees section of the House and Senate in the Official Congressional Directory, the committee's members on the first row on the left side shows the chairman of the committee and on the right side shows the ranking member of the committee.

=== Senate ===
- Aging: (Chairman: Pat McNamara; Ranking Member: )
- Aeronautical and Space Sciences (Chairman: Robert S. Kerr; Ranking Member: Styles Bridges, then Margaret Chase Smith)
- Agriculture and Forestry (Chairman: Allen J. Ellender; Ranking Member: George Aiken)
- Appropriations (Chairman: Carl Hayden; Ranking Member: Styles Bridges, then Leverett Saltonstall)
- Armed Services (Chairman: Richard B. Russell; Ranking Member: Leverett Saltonstall)
- Banking and Currency (Chairman: A. Willis Robertson; Ranking Member: Homer E. Capehart)
- District of Columbia (Chairman: Alan Bible; Ranking Member: J. Glenn Beall)
- Finance (Chairman: Harry F. Byrd; Ranking Member: John J. Williams)
- Foreign Relations (Chairman: J. William Fulbright; Ranking Member: Alexander Wiley)
- Government Operations (Chairman: John L. McClellan; Ranking Member: Karl Mundt)
- Interior and Insular Affairs (Chairman: Clinton P. Anderson; Ranking Member: Henry Dworshak, then Thomas Kuchel)
- Interstate and Foreign Commerce (Chairman: Warren G. Magnuson; Ranking Member: Andrew Frank Schoeppel, then Norris Cotton)
- Judiciary (Chairman: James O. Eastland; Ranking Member: Alexander Wiley)
- Labor and Public Welfare (Chairman: J. Lister Hill; Ranking Member: Barry Goldwater)
- National Fuels Study (Special)
- National Water Resources (Select)
- Post Office and Civil Service (Chairman: Olin D. Johnston; Ranking Member: Frank Carlson)
- Public Works (Chairman: Dennis Chavez; Ranking Member: Francis Case, then John Sherman Cooper)
- Rules and Administration (Chairman: Mike Mansfield; Ranking Member: Carl Curtis)
- Small Business (Select) (Chairman: John J. Sparkman; Ranking Member: )
- Subcommittee on Internal Security
- Whole

=== House of Representatives ===
- Agriculture (Chairman: Harold D. Cooley; Ranking Member: Charles B. Hoeven)
- Appropriations (Chairman: Clarence Cannon; Ranking Member: John Taber)
- Armed Services (Chairman: Carl Vinson; Ranking Member: Leslie C. Arends)
- Banking and Currency (Chairman: Brent Spence; Ranking Member: Clarence E. Kilburn)
- District of Columbia (Chairman: John L. McMillan; Ranking Member: James C. Auchincloss)
- Education and Labor (Chairman: Adam Clayton Powell; Ranking Member: Carroll D. Kearns)
- Export Control (Select) (Chairman: N/A; Ranking Member: N/A)
- Foreign Affairs (Chairman: Thomas E. Morgan; Ranking Member: Robert B. Chiperfield)
- Government Operations (Chairman: William L. Dawson; Ranking Member: Clare Hoffman)
- House Administration (Chairman: Omar Burleson; Ranking Member: Paul F. Schenck)
- Interior and Insular Affairs (Chairman: Wayne N. Aspinall; Ranking Member: John P. Saylor)
- Interstate and Foreign Commerce (Chairman: Oren Harris; Ranking Member: John B. Bennett)
- Judiciary (Chairman: Emanuel Celler; Ranking Member: William Moore McCulloch)
- Merchant Marine and Fisheries (Chairman: Herbert C. Bonner; Ranking Member: Thor C. Tollefson)
- Post Office and Civil Service (Chairman: Tom J. Murray; Ranking Member: Robert J. Corbett)
- Public Works (Chairman: Charles A. Buckley; Ranking Member: James C. Auchincloss)
- Rules (Chairman: Howard W. Smith; Ranking Member: Clarence J. Brown)
- Science and Astronautics (Chairman: Overton Brooks then George P. Miller; Ranking Member: Joseph W. Martin Jr.)
- Small Business (Select) (Chairman: Wright Patman; Ranking Member: )
- Standards of Official Conduct
- Un-American Activities (Chairman: Francis E. Walter; Ranking Member: Gordon H. Scherer)
- Veterans' Affairs (Chairman: Olin E. Teague; Vice Chairman: William Hanes Ayres)
- Ways and Means (Chairman: Wilbur D. Mills; Vice Chairman: Noah M. Mason)
- Whole

=== Joint committees ===
- Atomic Energy (Chairman: Rep. Chet Holifield; Vice Chairman: Sen. )
- Conditions of Indian Tribes (Special)
- Construction of a Building for a Museum of History and Technology for the Smithsonian
- Defense Production (Chairman: Sen. A. Willis Robertson; Vice Chairman: Rep. )
- Economic (Chairman: Rep. Wright Patman; Vice Chairman: Sen. )
- Immigration and Nationality Policy (Chairman: Vacant; Vice Chairman: Vacant)
- Legislative Budget
- The Library (Chairman: Rep. Omar Burleson; Vice Chairman: Sen. )
- Navajo-Hopi Indian Administration
- Printing (Chairman: Rep. Carl Hayden; Vice Chairman: Sen. )
- Reduction of Nonessential Federal Expenditures (Chairman: Sen. Harry F. Byrd; Vice Chairman: Rep. )
- Taxation (Chairman: Rep. Wilbur D. Mills; Vice Chairman: Sen. )

== Employees ==
=== Legislative branch agency directors ===
- Architect of the Capitol: J. George Stewart
- Attending Physician of the United States Congress: George Calver
- Comptroller General of the United States: Joseph Campbell
- Librarian of Congress: Lawrence Quincy Mumford
- Public Printer of the United States: Raymond Blattenberger, until 1961
  - James L. Harrison, from 1961

=== Senate ===
- Chaplain: Frederick Brown Harris (Methodist)
- Parliamentarian: Charles Watkins
- Secretary: Felton McLellan Johnston
- Librarian: Richard D. Hupman
- Secretary for the Majority: Robert G. Baker
- Secretary for the Minority: J. Mark Trice
- Sergeant at Arms: Joseph C. Duke

=== House of Representatives ===
- Chaplain: Bernard Braskamp (Presbyterian)
- Clerk: Ralph R. Roberts
- Doorkeeper: William Mosley "Fishbait" Miller
- Parliamentarian: Lewis Deschler
- Postmaster: H. H. Morris
- Reading Clerk: George J. Maurer (D) and Joe Bartlett (R)
- Sergeant at Arms: Zeake W. Johnson Jr.

== See also ==
- 1960 United States elections (elections leading to this Congress)
  - 1960 United States presidential election
  - 1960 United States Senate elections
  - 1960 United States House of Representatives elections
- 1962 United States elections (elections during this Congress, leading to the next Congress)
  - 1962 United States Senate elections
  - 1962 United States House of Representatives elections
