= Peter Peyser =

Peter Peyser may refer to:

- Peter A. Peyser (1921–2014), United States congressman
- Peter Allen Peyser, United States public affairs consultant
