= Fair Labor Standards Amendments of 1961 =

United States wage law

- Long title: To amend the Fair Labor Standards Act of 1938, as amended, to provide coverage for employees of large enterprises engaged in retail trade or service and of other employers engaged in commerce or in the production of goods for commerce, to increase the minimum wage under the Act to $1.25 an hour, and for other purposes.
- Enacted by: the 87th United States Congress
- Effective: September 3, 1961

Citations
- Public law: 87-30
- Statutes at Large: 75 Stat. 65

Codification
- Acts amended: Fair Labor Standards Act of 1938

Legislative history
- Introduced in the House as H.R. 3935 on February 7, 1961; Committee consideration by Banking; Passed the House on March 24, 1961 (341-78); Passed the Senate on April 20, 1961 (65-28); Reported by the joint conference committee on May 3, 1961; agreed to by the Senate on May 3, 1961 (64-28) and by the House on May 5, 1961 (230-196); Signed into law by President John F. Kennedy on May 5, 1961

The Fair Labor Standards Amendments of 1961 (Pub. L. 87–30, 75 Stat. 65) was a United States federal statute enacted by the 87th United States Congress and signed into law on May 5, 1961 by President John F. Kennedy. As apart of Kennedy's New Frontier agenda, it amends the Fair Labor Standards Act of 1938 to modernize federal labor laws, and introduces adjustments to wages for Americans at the low-end of the income distribution to match increases in the cost-of-living and increases in median earnings.

The Act authorized the expansion of the federal minimum wage to $1.10 per hour later in the year, starting September 3, 1961, and further to $1.25 per hour by September 3, 1963, a 25% increase over baseline levels. The law set allowed retail and service establishments to employ fulltime students at sub-minimum wage rates, but by no more than 15% lower than the statutory minimum rate. Coverage was extended to nearly 4.1 million Americans working in retail, service, construction or naval employment who were previously uncovered by older statutes, broadly in line with administration goals.

A number of amendments aimed at expanding coverage to hundreds of thousands of other service sector workers were proposed, but were defeated in committee. Another amendment, maintaining the exemption of hundreds of thousands of laundry workers from the federal minimum wage, that was proposed by Georgia's powerful conservative representative Carl Vinson, was successfully added to the bill.

Minimum wage coverage formulae were amended to cover all employees working in an enterprise that generates at least $1 million in annual revenue and engages in interstate commerce, rather than only applying to employees who personally engage in interstate commerce or produce goods for commerce. Nevertheless, the law maintained numerous exemptions to the minimum wage, including exemptions for individual establishments within the purview of covered enterprises were categorically exempted from having their employees covered by the new minimum wage law if their sales fell below $250,000 per year.

== See also ==
- Fair Labor Standards Act of 1938
- Minimum wage in the United States
