= Robert Nodar Jr. =

American politician

Robert Joseph Nodar Jr.
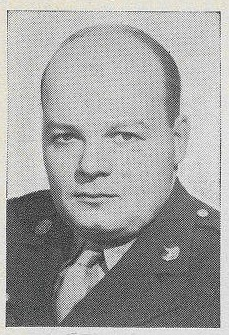

Member of the U.S. House of Representatives from New York's 6th district
- In office January 3, 1947 – January 3, 1949
- Preceded by: James J. Delaney
- Succeeded by: James J. Delaney

Personal details
- Born: March 23, 1916 Brooklyn, New York, U.S.
- Died: September 11, 1974 (aged 58) Flushing, Queens, New York, U.S.
- Party: Republican
- Spouse: Florence M. Nodar
- Education: Newtown High School, Elmhurst, New York
- Occupation: Clerk

Military service
- Allegiance: United States
- Branch/service: United States Army Air Forces
- Years of service: 1942–1946
- Rank: Master Sergeant
- Battles/wars: World War II

Robert Joseph Nodar Jr. (March 23, 1916 – September 11, 1974) was an American politician and a Republican member of the United States House of Representatives from New York.

== Biography ==
Nodar was born in Brooklyn, New York, attended the public schools of New York City and graduated from Newtown High School, Elmhurst, New York, in 1935.

== Career ==
Nodar was engaged as a clerk in the Manufacturers Trust Company, in New York City from 1935 to 1939; and with the Crucible Steel Corp. of America from 1940 to 1942.

During World War II, Nodar served in the United States Army Air Forces, with service in the South Pacific, from March 18, 1942, until discharged as a master sergeant on January 6, 1946.

Elected as a Republican to the Eightieth Congress in 1946, Nodar served from January 3, 1947 to January 3, 1949. An unsuccessful candidate for reelection in 1948 to the Eighty-first Congress, he became a clerk with Salomon Brothers & Hutzler in New York City.

In 1946, Nodar was one of the Republicans that Queens party chairman Warren B. Ashmead put up for three of the borough's four congressional seats, which were held by Democrats. All three of Ashmead's candidates won, though two years later all lost; in Nodar's case vote totals shifted from an eight-point victory to a fourteen-point loss. As a representative, he sponsored one bill that was enacted, which provided an academic advisory board for the Merchant Marine Academy; but he was largely absent from the floor, speaking only once in his two years. In 1950 Republicans renominated his two 1946 compatriots but passed on Nodar.

== Death ==
Nodar died in Flushing, Queens, New York on September 11, 1974 (age 58 years, 172 days). He is interred at Pinelawn Memorial Park, near Farmingdale, Long Island, New York.

U.S. House of Representatives
Preceded by James J. Delaney	Member of the U.S. House of Representatives from New York's 6th congressional district 1947–1949	Succeeded by James J. Delaney
