= James J. Delaney =

American politician (1901–1987)

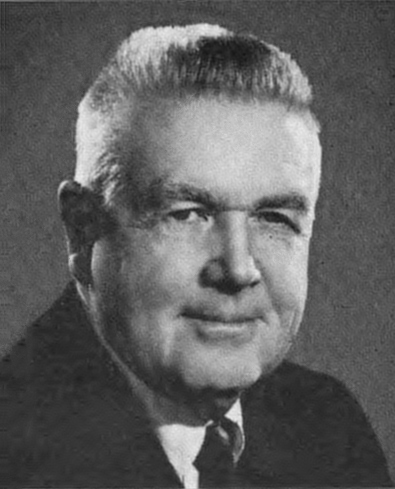

Chair of the House Rules Committee
- In office January 3, 1977 – December 31, 1978
- Speaker: Carl Albert; Tip O'Neill
- Preceded by: Ray Madden
- Succeeded by: Richard W. Bolling

Member of the U.S. House of Representatives from New York
- In office January 3, 1949 – December 31, 1978
- Preceded by: Robert J. Nodar, Jr.
- Succeeded by: Geraldine Ferraro
- Constituency: 6th district (1949–1953); 7th district (1953–1963); 9th district (1963–1978)
- In office January 3, 1945 – January 3, 1947
- Preceded by: Andrew L. Somers
- Succeeded by: Robert J. Nodar, Jr.
- Constituency: 6th district

Personal details
- Born: James Joseph Delaney; March 19, 1901 New York City, New York, U.S.
- Died: May 24, 1987 (aged 86) Key Biscayne, Florida, U.S.
- Party: Democratic
- Education: St. John's College

James Joseph Delaney (March 19, 1901 – May 24, 1987) was an American politician from New York. He was a member of the Democratic Party and served 16 terms in the House of Representatives from 1945 to 1947 and from 1949 to 1978.

== Biography ==
=== Early life ===
Delaney was born in New York City on March 19, 1901. He attended public school in Long Island City, Queens. In 1931, he graduated from the law department of St. John's College in Brooklyn with a LL.B. and was admitted to the bar in 1933. He worked as an assistant district attorney of Queens County from 1936 until his election in 1944.

=== Early career in Congress ===
Delaney was elected as a Democrat to the 79th Congress. In 1944, much of what was the 6th district was shifted to the 10th district taking Rep. Andrew Lawrence Somers with it. Delaney ran for the open 6th district seat and defeated Republican Otto Schuler.

Delaney suffered his only defeat in 1946. With President Harry S. Truman's popularity at a low point, the Republican Party gained 55 seats with Robert Nodar Jr. defeating Delaney. He regained the seat two years later in 1948 and won 14 consecutive elections afterwards.

During the late 1950s, after a series of lurid magazine articles and Hollywood films helped to sensationalize youth gangs and violence, Delaney was one of the first congressmen to author legislation banning automatic-opening or switchblade knives in 1954. On April 17, 1958, Delaney stated, "Every day our newspapers report numerous muggings and attacks, most of them involving knives. Can we sit by complacently and ignore the bloodshed in our streets?" The ban on switchblade knives was eventually enacted into law as the Switchblade Knife Act of 1958. Rep. Delaney and other congressmen supporting the Switchblade Knife Act believed that by stopping the importation and interstate sales of automatic knives (effectively halting sales of new switchblades), the law would reduce youth gang violence by blocking access to what had become a symbolic weapon. However, while switchblade imports, domestic production, and sales to lawful owners soon ended, later legislative research demonstrated that youth gang violence rates had in fact rapidly increased, as gang members turned to firearms instead of knives.

Delaney later became chairman of a Select Committee to conduct an investigation and study of the use of chemicals, pesticides, and insecticides in and with respect to food products (81st and 82nd Congresses). He was noted for adding the 1958 Delaney clause to the 1938 Federal Food, Drug, and Cosmetic Act to ban carcinogens as food additives, Committee on Rules (95th Congress).

=== Later career in Congress ===
His political views tracked those of his constituents, which included many working class, but socially conservative Catholic voters. Voters who supported Franklin Delano Roosevelt and John F. Kennedy in previous elections supported Richard Nixon three-to-one over George McGovern. Delaney's political views became more conservative over his time in Congress. In 1961, he helped to defeat an education funding bill in 1961 because it excluded parochial schools from receiving funding. He also opposed busing to integrate schools and supported the Vietnam War. In the 91st Congress, the liberal interest group Americans for Democratic Action gave him a 25% rating while the American Conservative Union gave him a 69% rating.

He further angered forces in the Democratic Party when he endorsed Conservative Party candidate James Buckley in the 1970 Senate election. Delaney himself received the endorsement on the Conservative line for his own re-election bid in 1970. In 1971, the New York delegation expelled him from delegation meetings after he opposed a bill from Rep. Benjamin S. Rosenthal to set up a consumer protection agency. As a high-ranking member of the House Rules Committee, Delaney helped kill the bill.

In 1972, Delaney faced his closest election race since his defeat in 1946. Councilman Matthew Troy, the Queens Democratic Party leader supported his fellow Councilman Thomas Manton to run in the Democratic primary. The local party split between the two candidates with Troy backing Manton and other party leaders like Thomas J. Mackell, the district attorney, who reported backed Delaney. On Election Day, Delaney won renomination, but Manton took 46% of the vote.

After his 1972 victory, Delaney moved closer to the Democratic fold and was eventually elected as the delegation leader in the House. He also credited his conservative views and friendships with conservative leaders in helping secure the New York City Seasonal Financing Act of 1975, which provided the city with a $2.3 billion loan to stave off bankruptcy. Delaney also played a role in the enactment of the second New York City bailout—the New York City Loan Guarantee Act—when he served as Chairman of the Bipartisan New York State Congressional Delegation and Chairman of the House Committee on Rules, which cleared the bill for consideration on the House floor. Coordinating the activities of the congressional delegation for Delaney was his Legislative Assistant, Peter Allen Peyser.

Delaney did not run for re-election in 1978, and future vice presidential candidate Geraldine Ferraro won the election to succeed him. He resigned December 31, 1978.

=== Later life ===
Delaney was a resident of Key Biscayne, Florida, until his death in Tenafly, New Jersey on May 24, 1987. He was interred in Calvary Cemetery in Queens.

== Notes ==
U.S. House of Representatives
Preceded by Andrew L. Somers	Member of the U.S. House of Representatives from New York's 6th congressional district 1945–1947	Succeeded by Robert Nodar, Jr.
Preceded by Robert Nodar, Jr.	Member of the U.S. House of Representatives from New York's 6th congressional district 1949–1953	Succeeded by Lester Holtzman
Preceded by Louis B. Heller	Member of the U.S. House of Representatives from New York's 7th congressional district 1953–1963	Succeeded by Joseph P. Addabbo
Preceded by Eugene J. Keogh	Member of the U.S. House of Representatives from New York's 9th congressional district 1963–1978	Succeeded by Geraldine Ferraro
Political offices
Preceded by Ray Madden; Indiana	Chairman of House Rules Committee; 1977–1978	Succeeded by Claude D. Pepper; Florida

== General Reference ==
- James Joseph Delaney Papers, 1950-1978. M.E. Grenander Department of Special Collections and Archives, University Libraries, University at Albany, State University of New York (hereafter referred to as the Delaney Papers).
