= Catherine Dorris Norrell =

American politician (1901–1981)

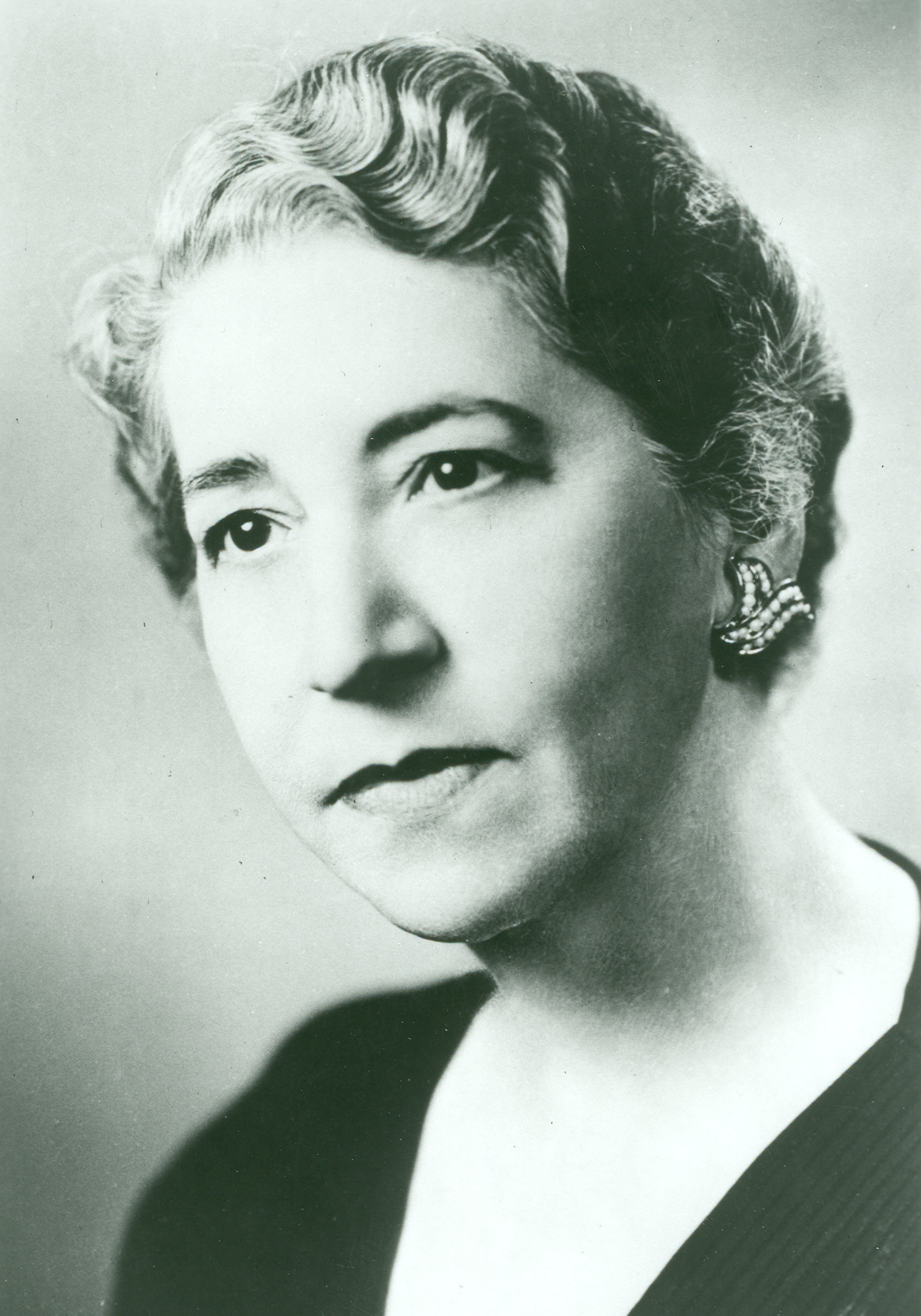

Member of the U.S. House of Representatives from Arkansas's 6th district
- In office April 19, 1961 – January 3, 1963
- Preceded by: William F. Norrell
- Succeeded by: District eliminated

Personal details
- Born: Catherine Dorris; March 30, 1901 Camden, Ouachita County; Arkansas, USA
- Died: August 26, 1981 (aged 80) Warren, Bradley County; Arkansas
- Resting place: Oakland Cemetery in Monticello, Arkansas
- Party: Democratic
- Spouse: William F. Norrell
- Children: Judy Norrell
- Education: Ouachita Baptist University; University of Arkansas at Fayetteville
- Occupation: Educator

Catherine Dorris Norrell (March 30, 1901 – August 26, 1981) was the third woman in Arkansas history to gain a seat in the United States House of Representatives.

== Early life ==
Catherine Dorris was born in Camden, Ouachita County, Arkansas to Baptist preacher Franklin Dorris, and Rose Whitehead Dorris in 1901. The family moved to various congregations in Tennessee, Texas, and Arkansas before they settled and Catherine Dorris finished high school in Monticello, Arkansas. She attended Ouachita Baptist University in Arkadelphia, and the University of Arkansas in Fayetteville. While there, she became a skilled organist and pianist and went on to serve as director of the music department at Arkansas A & M College (now Arkansas State University) and teach in the Arkansas public school system.

== Family ==
Norrell was married to William Frank Norrell from 1922 until his death in 1961. Together they had one child, Julia Jean "Judy" Norrell. Catherine Norrell worked alongside her husband for three decades and succeeded him in the United States House of Representatives following his death. While on leave from George Washington University Law School, Judy Norell managed her mother's 1961 campaign.

== Political career ==
Serving as president of the Congressional Wives Club, Norrell befriended Hattie Wyatt Caraway of Jonesboro, Arkansas, who was the first woman ever elected to the U.S. Senate.

Norrell worked in the political sphere since the 1930s when her husband was elected to the Arkansas Senate and later to the U.S. House of Representatives in 1938. Catherine Norrell worked as her husband's legislative assistant while he served in the state legislation and Congress. Following her husband's death, she began her campaign for his seat with the slogan: "Keep Your Congressional Power Up! Elect Mrs. W. F. Norrell…the Only Candidate Prepared to Step In."

Norrell was elected as a Democratic candidate to the Eighty-seventh United States Congress April 18, 1961, to fill the vacant seat. In the special election she faced four Democratic male candidates, including lawyer and banker John Harris Jones (born 1922) of Pine Bluff, who attacked Norrell, claiming if elected, she would benefit financially from the congressional salary as well as a pension from her husband's House service. Norrell succeeded in defeating her opponents, winning with 43 percent of the vote to 25 percent for Jones and 23 percent for M.C. Lewis. Catherine Norrell was one of only 20 women serving in the 87th Congress. She took her oath of office on April 25, 1961 and served until January 3, 1963. She was ineligible for renomination due to the elimination of Arkansas's 6th congressional district.

Norrell's first vote in Congress was in favor of the Kennedy administration's Cold War policies that proposed foreign aid to Latin American countries.

In office, Norrell focused her efforts on ensuring economic development for Arkansas and especially, her Sixth District. She made legislative strides to protect her home-state's clay, textile, and lumber industries through increased government control. Norrell noticed the wood industry within her district suffered from reduced tariff rates and she sequentially joined Representative Cleveland M. Bailey of West Virginia in supporting a bill that would ease Internal Revenue Service (IRS) efforts to collect retroactive taxes. This was intended to protect businesses in those areas from financial harassment as well as from foreign countries who failed to reciprocate. In May 1961, Norrell showed her support of the Equal Rights Amendment by sponsoring a joint resolution calling for the Amendment's passage.

Norrell also supported the Equal Rights Amendment and signed a joint resolution in May 1961 which called for its passage. Though Norrell and her husband both identified as Democrats, she was able to stand apart from her husband in her political decisions; she claimed "I expect in the future my vote will be more conservative than liberal."

== Legacy ==
The dissolution of Arkansas's Sixth District, paired with familial, political, and especially financial reasons discouraged Norrell from running against two powerful incumbents Representative Mills and Representative Oren Harris. Judy, Norrell's daughter and campaign manager was concerned with the stress the campaign would have on her mother and their family so she consequently discouraged her mother from rerunning. In private, Catherine Norrell revealed to friends that financially, she could not afford the contested campaign.

After her term in Congress, President Kennedy appointed her Deputy Assistant Secretary of State for Educational and Cultural Affairs where she served from 1963 to 1965. She later served from June 1, 1965 until January 5, 1969 as director of the United States Department of State Reception Center in Honolulu after being appointed by Lyndon B. Johnson. Norrell noted that her husband had voted against Hawaii statehood but she had favored admission of the fiftieth state. She explained, "...that was my husband and not me... I'm delighted to be here.".

She resided in Monticello, Arkansas, until her death in Warren in Bradley County. Norrell worked as a church musician in Hawaii for most of her retirement before returning to her hometown of Monticello, Arkansas. On August 26, 1981, Catherine Norrell died in Warren, Arkansas. She was interred alongside her husband at Oakland Cemetery in Monticello.

== See also ==
- Women in the United States House of Representatives

U.S. House of Representatives
| Preceded by William F. Norrell | Member of the U.S. House of Representatives from Arkansas's 6th congressional district April 19, 1961 – January 3, 1963 | Succeeded by Position abolished through reapportionment |
