= Lester Holtzman =

American politician

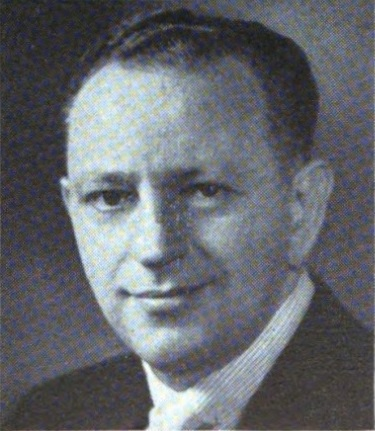

Member of the U.S. House of Representatives from New York's 6th district
- In office January 3, 1953 – December 31, 1961
- Preceded by: James J. Delaney
- Succeeded by: Benjamin Rosenthal

Personal details
- Born: June 1, 1913 New York City
- Died: November 12, 2002 (aged 89) Tamarac, Florida, U.S.
- Party: Democratic Party
- Education: Fordham University School of Law
- Occupation: Attorney

Lester Holtzman (June 1, 1913 – November 12, 2002) was an American lawyer, jurist, and politician. He served four terms in the United States House of Representatives from 1953 to 1961. He was later a justice of the New York Supreme Court, serving from 1962 until 1973.

== Early life ==
Holtzman was born in New York City on June 1, 1913 to Jewish immigrants from Poland, Isidore and Rebecca. Lester was the couple's only child born in the United States. He had an older sister Rose who was born in Poland and immigrated with her parents. They are the only two to survive infancy. The family lived on the Lower East Side in Manhattan until 1916, when Lester contracted polio. They settled in the Middle Village, in Queens which might offer a better chance to recover. He attended Newtown High School in Queens until his father bought a small grocery where Lester would work while doing Prelaw work in the evening.

He was the president of his class at St. John's University School of Law and graduated in 1936. Afterwards, he went into private practice in Queens.

== Political career ==
Holtzman had sought political jobs for several years; once receiving an offer from the Federal Housing Administration. He ran for Congress in 1952, a year that saw Dwight Eisenhower sweep into the White House and the Republicans picked up 22 seats in the House of Representatives. His opponent was Robert Tripp Ross, an incumbent who had won his seat in a special election a few months before. During the campaign, he promised that he would cease takeoffs by low-flying aircraft into Laguardia Airport, which was in the district. Holtzman admitted later this was a lie and was the only lie he consciously told in his career. He defeated Ross by a close 300 votes becoming the only Democrat to unseat a Republican that year, and the first Jewish congressman from Queens.

He defeated popular state senator Seymour Halpern in 1954 by more than 10,000 votes and former justice Albert Buschmann in the 1956 election. In his career, Holtzman was generally a backbencher who supported civil rights, Israel and organized labor; but never introduced any legislation that was signed into law.

== Judicial career ==
After his re-election in 1960, Holtzman decided to run for a seat on the state Supreme Court. The 14-year term and increased salary would give him a measure of security. He secured the nomination thanks to assistance from President John F. Kennedy and his brother Robert.

As a justice, he handled the first divorce case in New York after laws were reformed. In 1971, he was assigned a case that challenged New York's 1970 legalization of abortion. In Byrn v. New York City Health and Hospitals Corp., Holtzman ruled that Professor Robert Byrn of Fordham University could act as a guardian for the unborn, which afforded him legal standing to file suit overturn the state's abortion law. He also entered an order for the city hospitals to show cause why they should not cease abortion procedures while the law was being challenged.

In 1972, Byrn's challenge was decided by an opinion of the Appellate Division and the New York Court of Appeals in which fetuses were not found to have personhood.

He retired from the bench in 1973 to become the president of the Queens Savings & Loan Association.

== Personal life ==
Holtzman married the former Mae Gress in 1936. They had two children, Matthew and Joy. Holtzman died in Rockville, Maryland on November 12, 2002.

== See also ==
- List of Jewish members of the United States Congress

U.S. House of Representatives
Preceded by James J. Delaney	Member of the U.S. House of Representatives from New York's 6th congressional district 1953–1961	Succeeded by Benjamin Rosenthal
