= Peter Allen Peyser =

United States public affairs consultant

Peter Allen Peyser is a United States public affairs consultant. He is a former member of the administration of New York City Mayor Edward I. Koch, former Chief of Staff to Rep. Geraldine A. Ferraro (D-NY) and former staffer to Reps. James J. Delaney (D-NY) and Peter H. Kostmayer (D-PA). In 2012, he founded Peyser Associates LLC, a public affairs and strategic business consulting firm with offices in New York City and Washington, DC. From 2005 to 2012 he was a Principal at Blank Rome Government Relations LLC, a subsidiary of the law firm Blank Rome LLP. He was Managing Principal of the firm from 2006 to 2012. Prior to joining Blank Rome, Peyser was president of Peyser Associates, Inc., a Washington, DC based public affairs firm from 1982 to 2005.

== Career ==
Peyser's consulting practice has focused on the representation of state and local government entities in their dealings with the federal government. Among the elected officials he has represented are Governor and Mayor Ed Rendell (Pennsylvania and Philadelphia, respectively); Governors Bill Richardson (New Mexico), Tim Kaine (Virginia), and Evan Bayh (Indiana); Mayors Norman B. Rice, Paul Schell and Greg Nickels (Seattle), and Mayors Bill Green and Wilson Goode (Philadelphia). He has represented the public transportation authorities in the metro areas of New York, Chicago, Boston, Philadelphia, Seattle, Portland (OR), and San Diego.

Peyser's professional and personal lives intersected dramatically in 1991 when his wife at the time, Penny E. Gentilly, suffered a severe traumatic brain injury in an auto accident. Gentilly had recently left her post as executive director of the House of Representatives Democratic Caucus, where she was one of the highest ranking female staff Members on Capitol Hill. Legislation was pending at that time to make airbags and other head injury protection mandatory in autos sold in the U.S.. Because of both his and his wife's profile on Capitol Hill a group called Advocates for Auto and Highway Safety asked Peyser to join a pro bono lobbying effort on behalf of the legislation. The legislation was adopted as part of the Intermodal Surface Transportation Efficiency Act of 1991 (ISTEA) and signed into law by President George H.W. Bush.

Prior to entering private practice, Peyser was assistant director of the City of New York Washington Office under Mayor Edward I. Koch. In that position, he represented the city's interests on transportation, housing and economic development matters. Prior to that he served as the first Chief of Staff to Rep. Geraldine A. Ferraro and as Legislative Assistant to Representatives James J. Delaney (D-NY) and Peter H. Kostmayer (D-PA).

Peyser and Ferraro were reunited professionally when she joined Blank Rome in 2006.

== Biography ==
Peyser was born on January 14, 1954. His father, Peter A. Peyser (1921–2014), served as a Member of Congress from New York from 1971 to 1977 as a Republican and from 1979 to 1983 as a Democrat. His mother; the former Marguerite Richards of Monroe, LA.; was born in 1930 and died in 2020. He has four siblings, Penny Peyser, James Peyser, Safi Abheeti (born Carolyn Peyser) and Thomas Peyser. He has one daughter, Kimberly A. Peyser of Washington, DC.

Peyser holds a Bachelor of Arts degree from Williams College (1976) and a Master of Arts degree from The George Washington University (1982).
