= William F. Norrell =

American politician (1896-1961)

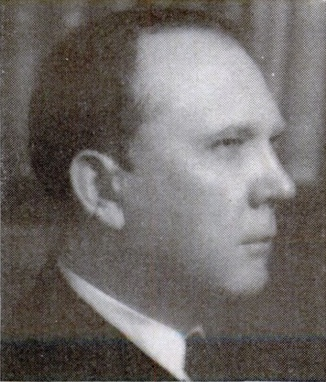

Member of the U.S. House of Representatives from Arkansas's 6th district
- In office January 3, 1939 – February 15, 1961
- Preceded by: John L. McClellan
- Succeeded by: Catherine Dorris Norrell

Arkansas State Senator
- In office 1930–1938

President of the Arkansas State Senate
- In office 1934–1938
- Preceded by: Ned Stewart
- Succeeded by: Fred S. Armstrong

Personal details
- Born: William Frank Norrell; August 29, 1896 Milo, Ashley County, Arkansas, U.S.
- Died: February 15, 1961 (aged 64) Washington, D.C.
- Resting place: Oakland Cemetery; Monticello, Arkansas, U.S.
- Party: Democratic
- Spouse: Catherine Dorris Norrell
- Children: Judy Norrell
- Education: Arkansas Agricultural and Mechanical College of Monticello; College of the Ozarks; University of Arkansas Law School at Little Rock

Military service
- Allegiance: United States
- Branch/service: United States Army

William Frank Norrell (August 29, 1896 – February 15, 1961) was a U.S. representative from Arkansas' former 6th congressional district. Upon his death, he was succeeded in Congress by his widow, Catherine Dorris Norrell. He also served in the Arkansas Senate.

== Early life and education ==
Born on a farm in Milo in Ashley County in south Arkansas, Norrell attended the public schools, the University of Arkansas at Monticello, then known as Arkansas Agricultural and Mechanical College, the University of the Ozarks, then College of the Ozarks in Clarksville, Arkansas, and the University of Arkansas at Little Rock Law School.

== Career ==
During World War I, Norrell served in the United States Army Quartermaster Corps. In 1920, he was admitted to the bar and commenced practice in Monticello in Drew County, Arkansas.

From 1930 to 1938, Norrell served as member of the Arkansas State Senate. He was the Senate President from 1934 to 1938 under lieutenant governors William Lee Cazort and Robert L. Bailey.

Norrell was elected as a Democrat to the Seventy-sixth and to the eleven succeeding Congresses and served from January 3, 1939, until his death in Washington, D.C. He was a signatory to the 1956 Southern Manifesto that opposed the desegregation of public schools ordered by the Supreme Court in Brown v. Board of Education.

== Burial ==
He is interred beside his wife at Oakland Cemetery in Monticello, Arkansas.

== See also ==
- List of members of the United States Congress who died in office (1950–1999)

== Note ==
U.S. House of Representatives
Preceded by John L. McClellan	Member of the U.S. House of Representatives from Arkansas's 6th congressional district 1939–1961	Succeeded by Catherine Dorris Norrell
Preceded by Ned Stewart	President of the Arkansas State Senate; 1934–1938	Succeeded by Fred S. Armstrong
