= New Frontier =

Political slogan and the set of policy programs promoted by John F. Kennedy

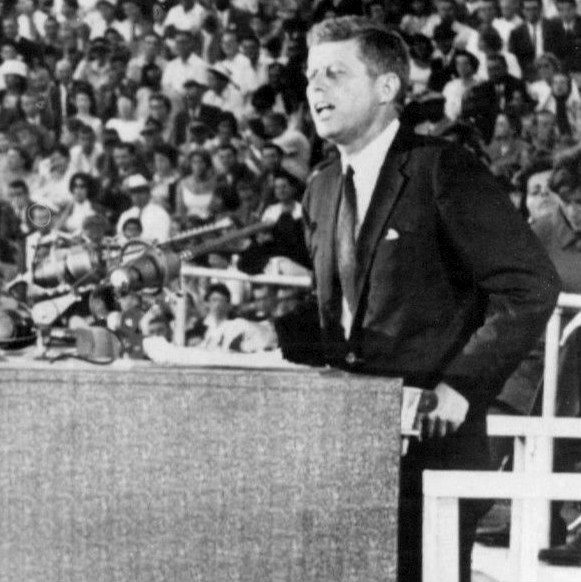
John F. Kennedy delivering his acceptance speech at the Democratic National Convention in 1960.

The term New Frontier was used by Democratic presidential candidate John F. Kennedy in his acceptance speech, delivered July 15, to the 1960 Democratic National Convention at the Los Angeles Memorial Coliseum. The phrase became a label for his administration's domestic and foreign programs.

In the words of Robert D. Marcus: "Kennedy entered office with ambitions to eradicate poverty and to raise America's eyes to the stars through the space program."

== Origin ==
Kennedy proclaimed in his speech:

We stand today on the edge of a New Frontier—the frontier of the 1960s, the frontier of unknown opportunities and perils, the frontier of unfilled hopes and unfilled threats. ... The pioneers gave up their safety, their comfort, and sometimes their lives to build our new west. They were determined to make the new world strong and free - an example to the world. ... Some would say that those struggles are all over, that all the horizons have been explored, that all the battles have been won. That there is no longer an American frontier. ... And we stand today on the edge of a new frontier, the frontier of unknown opportunities and perils. ... Beyond that frontier are uncharted areas of science and space, unsolved problems of peace and war, unconquered problems of ignorance and prejudice, unanswered questions of poverty and surplus. ... I'm asking each of you to be pioneers towards that New Frontier. My call is to the young in heart, regardless of age. ... Can we carry through in an age where we will witness not only new breakthroughs in weapons of destruction, but also a race for mastery of the sky and the rain, the ocean and the tides, the far side of space, and the inside of men's minds? ... All mankind waits upon our decision. A whole world waits to see what we shall do. And we cannot fail that trust, and we cannot fail to try.

== Legislation ==
Among the legislation passed by Congress during the Kennedy administration, unemployment benefits were expanded, aid was provided to cities to improve housing and transportation, funds were allocated to continue the construction of a national highway system started under Eisenhower, a water pollution control act was passed to protect the country's rivers and streams, and an agricultural act to raise farmers' incomes was made law. A significant amount of anti-poverty legislation was passed by Congress, including increases in social security benefits and in the minimum wage, several housing bills, and aid to economically distressed areas.

A few anti-recession public works packages, together with a number of measures designed to assist farmers, were introduced. Major expansions and improvements were made in Social Security (including early retirement at 62 for men), hospital construction, library services, family farm assistance and reclamation. A pilot food stamp program for certain groups of low-income Americans was reintroduced, food distribution to the poor was increased, and there was an expansion in school milk and lunch distribution. The most comprehensive farm legislation since 1938 was carried out, with expansions in rural electrification, soil conservation, crop insurance, farm credit, and marketing orders.

In September 1961, the Arms Control and Disarmament Agency was established as the focal point in government for the "planning, negotiation, and execution of international disarmament and arms control agreements."

Altogether, the New Frontier witnessed the passage of a broad range of social and economic reforms. However, proposed legislation which was considered more revolutionary languished in Congress. According to Theodore White, under John F. Kennedy, more new legislation was actually approved and passed into law than at any other time since the 1930s. When Congress recessed in the latter part of 1961, 33 out of 53 bills that Kennedy had submitted to Congress were enacted. A year later, 40 out of 54 bills that the Kennedy Administration had proposed were passed by Congress, and in 1963, 35 out of 58 "must" bills were enacted. As noted by Larry O'Brien, "A myth had arisen that he [Kennedy] was uninterested in Congress, or that he 'failed' with Congress. The facts, I believe, are otherwise. Kennedy's legislative record in 1961–63 was the best of any President since Roosevelt's first term."

However, the Independence Hall Association's website U.S. History.org describes then-Vice President and future U.S. president Lyndon Johnson's Great Society as the "largest reform agenda since Roosevelt's New Deal" and as what also managed to "complete the unfinished work of JFK's New Frontier." In his book John F. Kennedy on Leadership, John A. Barnes stated Congress in fact passed few of Kennedy's New Frontier proposals during his lifetime, with major initiatives not being enacted until 1964 and 1965, during Johnson's Presidency. The United States Department of Labor also stated that Johnson "immediately set about to enact the balance of Kennedy's New Frontier" after taking office following Kennedy's assassination. It has also been acknowledged that during his presidency, Kennedy had placed Johnson, a former Senate Majority Leader, in charge of getting his New Frontier proposals passed through Congress.

== Advisors ==
Historians and political scientists were given prominent positions within the Kennedy administration. Several themes that were popular in the post-World War II American histories were apparent during the administration and also reflected in the television series Profiles in Courage. Arthur Schlesinger Jr. was an important figure in the post-war efforts to create a "moderately liberal domestic consensus". Beginning in 1961, Schlesinger served as a special assistant to Kennedy. He was a member of the liberal lobbying group Americans for Democratic Action and in 1949 he published The Vital Center, a book which has been described as "a manifesto for anticommunist liberals, defining an agenda that combined the social concerns of the New Deal with support for the Cold War policy of containment of Soviet power."

Within Schlesinger's analytical framework of the domestic politics of the United States during this period he identifies three main ideological currents: 1) what he calls the "vital center" are the "New Deal liberals" who had been gaining ground politically since 1933, 2) right-wing racial extremists mostly confined to the Southern regions of the United States, and 3) Communists who Schlesinger identifies as posing the "primary opposition to American values from within and without". Schlesinger, working on Kennedy's presidential campaign in 1960, sought an image of the candidate that would show the candidate's personal and individual accomplishment as counter to a collectivist ethos. Schlesinger's work along with Richard Neustadt's and other thinkers were key influences in the development of the New Frontier-era policies.

== Legislation and programs ==
=== Economy ===
The Kennedy Administration pushed an economic stimulus program through congress in an effort to kick-start the American economy following an economic downturn. On February 2, 1961, Kennedy sent a comprehensive Economic Message to Congress which had been in preparation for several weeks. The legislative proposals put forward in this message included:

1. The addition of a temporary thirteen-week supplement to jobless benefits,
2. The extension of aid to the children of unemployed workers,
3. The redevelopment of distressed areas,
4. An increase in Social Security payments and the encouragement of earlier retirement,
5. An increase in the minimum wage and an extension in coverage,
6. The provision of emergency relief to feed grain farmers,
7. The financing of a comprehensive home building and slum clearance program.

The following month, the first of these seven measures became law, and the remaining six measures had been signed by the end of June. Altogether, the economic stimulus program provided an estimated 420,000 construction jobs under a new Housing Act, $175 million in higher wages for those below the new minimum, over $400 million in aid to over 1,000 distressed counties, over $200 million in extra welfare payments to 750,000 children and their parents, and nearly $800 million in extended unemployment benefits for nearly three million unemployed Americans.

- Under his own presidential authority, Kennedy carried out various measures to boost the economy under his own executive anti-recessionary acceleration program. Through his own initiative, he directed all Federal agencies to accelerate their procurement and construction, particularly in labor surplus areas. A long-range program of post office construction was compressed into the first six months of his presidency, farm price supports were raised and their payments advanced, over a billion dollars in state highway aid funds were released ahead of schedule, and the distribution of tax refunds and GI life insurance dividends were sped up. In addition, free food distribution to needy families was expanded, state governors were urged by Kennedy to spend federal funds more rapidly for hospitals, schools, roads, and waste treatment facilities, the college housing and urban renewal programs were pushed forward, and procurement agencies were directed to make purchases in areas of high unemployment.
- In an attempt to expand credit and stimulate building, Kennedy ordered a reduction in the maximum permissible interest rate on FHA insured loans, reduced the interest rate on Small Business Administration loans in distressed areas, expanded its available credit and liberalized lending by the Federal Home Loan Banks. The Federal Reserve Board was also encouraged to help keep long-term interest rates low through the purchase of long-term government issues.
- By 1964 economic recovery had begun, as low interest rates in mid-1962 stimulated a boom in the housing industry, while accelerated expenditures on veterans' benefits, highway building, and other government procurement programs revived consumer demand.
- The Trade Expansion Act of 1962 authorized the president to negotiate tariff reductions on a reciprocal basis of up to 50 percent with the European Common Market. It provided legislative authority for U.S. participation in multilateral trade negotiations from 1964 to 1967, which became known as the Kennedy Round. The authority expired June 30, 1967, predetermining the concluding date of the Kennedy Round. U.S. duties below five percent ad valorem, duties on certain agricultural commodities, and duties on tropical products exported by developing countries could be reduced to zero under the act. The 1962 legislation explicitly eliminated the "Peril Point" provision that had limited U.S. negotiating positions in earlier General Agreement on Tariffs and Trade (GATT) rounds, and instead called on the Tariff Commission and other agencies of the U.S. government to provide the president and his negotiators with information regarding the probable economic effects of specific tariff concessions.

=== Taxation ===
Under the Kennedy Administration, the most significant tax reforms since the New Deal were carried out, including a new investment tax credit. President Kennedy said one of the best ways to bolster the economy was to cut taxes, and December 14, 1962, Kennedy stated at the Economic Club of New York that:

The final and best means of strengthening demand among consumers and business is to reduce the burden on private income and the deterrents to private initiative which are imposed by our present tax system; and this administration pledged itself last summer to an across-the-board, top-to-bottom cut in personal and corporate income taxes to be enacted and become effective in 1963. I am not talking about a 'quickie' or a temporary tax cut, which would be more appropriate if a recession were imminent. Nor am I talking about giving the economy a mere shot in the arm, to ease some temporary complaint. I am talking about the accumulated evidence of the last 5 years that our present tax system, developed as it was, in good part, during World War II to restrain growth, exerts too heavy a drag on growth in peacetime; that it siphons out of the private economy too large a share of personal and business purchasing power; that it reduces the financial incentives for personal effort, investment, and risk-taking.

Kennedy specifically advocated cutting the corporate tax rate in this same speech. "Corporate tax rates must also be cut to increase incentives and the availability of investment capital. The Government has already taken major steps this year to reduce business tax liability and to stimulate the modernization, replacement, and expansion of our productive plant and equipment. We have done this through the 1962 investment tax credit and through the liberalization of depreciation allowances—two essential parts of our first step in tax revision which amounted to a 10 percent reduction in corporate income taxes worth $2.5 billion." President Kennedy went on to say he preferred tax cuts for the rich as well as the poor:

Next year's tax bill should reduce personal as well as corporate income taxes, for those in the lower brackets, who are certain to spend their additional take-home pay, and for those in the middle and upper brackets, who can thereby be encouraged to undertake additional efforts and enabled to invest more capital.

On the same evening, President Kennedy said the private sector and not the public sector was the key to economic growth:

"In short, to increase demand and lift the economy, the Federal Government's most useful role is not to rush into a program of excessive increases in public expenditures, but to expand the incentives and opportunities for private expenditures." President Kennedy told the economic club the impact he expected from tax cuts. "Profit margins will be improved and both the incentive to invest and the supply of internal funds for investment will be increased. There will be new interest in taking risks, in increasing productivity, in creating new jobs and new products for long-term economic growth."

=== Labor ===
- Amendments to the Fair Labor Standards Act in 1961 greatly expanded the FLSA's scope in the retail trade sector and increased the minimum wage for previously covered workers to $1.15 an hour, effective September 1961, and to $1.25 an hour by September 1963. The minimum for workers newly subject to the Act was set at $1.00 an hour effective September 1961, $1.15 an hour in September 1964, and $1.25 an hour in September 1965. Retail and service establishments were allowed to employ full-time students at wages of no more than 15 percent below the minimum with proper certification from the Department of Labor. The amendments extended coverage to employees of retail trade enterprises with sales exceeding $1 million annually, although individual establishments within those covered enterprises were exempt if their annual sales fell below $250,000. The concept of enterprise coverage was introduced by the 1961 amendments. Those amendments extended coverage in the retail trade industry from an established 250,000 workers to 2.2 million. According to one study, "It was the first coverage extension of workers' hours and wages since 1938, the last year before the Conservative Coalition took philosophical control of Congress from Roosevelt's New Dealers."
- An Executive Order was issued (1962) which provided federal employees with collective bargaining rights.
- The services of US Employment Offices were expanded.
- The Federal Salary Reform Act (1962) established the principle of "maintaining federal white-collar wages at a level with those paid to employees performing similar jobs in private enterprises."
- A Postal Service and Federal Employees Salary Act was passed (1962) to reform Federal white-collar statutory salary systems, adjust postal rates, and establish a standard for adjusting annuities under the Civil Service Retirement Act. This legislation marked the first time that a consistent guideline for regular increases was applied to the national pay scales for federal white-collar and postal employees.
- The Contract Work Hours and Safety Standards Act (1962) established "standards for hours, overtime compensation, and safety for employees working on federal and federally funded contracts and subcontracts".
- An 11-member Missile Site Labor Commission was established "to develop procedures for settling disputes on the government's 22 missile bases."
- A pilot program was launched to train and place youths in jobs.
- Paid overtime was granted to workers on government financed construction jobs for work in excess of 40 hours.

=== Education ===
- Scholarships and student loans were broadened under existing laws by Kennedy, and new means of specialized aid to education were invented or expanded by the president, including an increase in funds for libraries and school lunches, the provision of funds to teach the deaf, children with physical or cognitive disabilities, and gifted children, the authorization of literacy training under Manpower Development, the allocation of president funds to stop dropouts, a quadrupling of vocational education, and working together with schools on delinquency. Altogether, these measures attacked serious educational problems and freed up local funds for use on general construction and salaries.
- Kennedy used his presidential "emergency fund" to distribute $250,000 for guidance counsellors in a drive against school dropouts.
- Various measures were introduced which aided educational television, college dormitories, medical education, and community libraries.
- The Educational Television Facilities Act (1962) provided federal grants for new station construction, enabling in-class-room instructional television to operate in thousands of elementary schools, offering primarily religious instruction, music, and arts.
- The Health Professions Educational Assistance Act (1963) provided $175 million over a three-year period for matching grants for the construction of facilities for teaching physicians, dentists, nurses, podiatrists, optometrists, pharmacists, and other health professionals. The Act also created a loan program of up to $2000 per annum for students of optometry, dentistry, and medicine.
- The Vocational Education Act (1963) significantly increased enrollment in vocational education.
- A law was enacted (1961) to encourage and facilitate the training of teachers of the deaf.
- The Fulbright-Hays Act of 1961 enlarged the scope of the Fulbright program while extending it geographically.
- An estimated one-third of all major New Frontier programs made some form of education a vital element, and the Office of Education called it "the most significant legislative period in its hundred-year history".
- The McIntire–Stennis Act of 1962 provided federal financial support to universities and colleges for forestry research and graduate education.

=== Welfare ===
- Unemployment and welfare benefits were expanded.
- In 1961, Social Security benefits were increased by 20% and provision for early retirement was introduced, enabling workers to retire at the age of sixty-two while receiving partial benefits.
- The Social Security Amendments of 1961 permitted male workers to elect early retirement age 62, increased minimum benefits, liberalized the benefit payments to aged widow, widower, or surviving dependent parent, and also liberalized eligibility requirements and the retirement test.
- The 1962 amendments to the Social Security Act authorized the federal government to reimburse states for the provision of social services.
- The School Lunch Act was amended for authority to begin providing free meals in poverty-stricken areas.
- A pilot food stamp program was launched (1961), covering six areas in the United States. In 1962, the program was extended to eighteen areas, feeding 240,000 people.
- Various school lunch and school milk programs were extended, "enabling 700,000 more children to enjoy a hot school lunch and eighty-five thousand more schools, child care centers, and camps to receive fresh milk".
- ADC was extended to whole families (1961).
- Aid to Families with Dependent Children (AFDC) replaced the Aid to Dependent Children (ADC) program, as coverage was extended to adults caring for dependent children.
- A major revision of the public welfare laws was carried out, with a $300 million modernisation which emphasised rehabilitation instead of relief".
- A temporary antirecession supplement to unemployment compensation was introduced.
- Food distribution to needy Americans was increased. In January 1961, the first executive order issued by Kennedy mandated that the Department of Agriculture increase the quantity and variety of foods donated for needy households. This executive order represented a shift in the Commodity Distribution Programs' primary purpose, from surplus disposal to that of providing nutritious foods to low-income households.
- Social Security benefits were extended to an additional five million Americans.
- The Self-Employed Individuals Tax Retirement Act (1962) provided self-employed people with a tax postponement for income set aside in qualified pension plans.
- The Public Welfare Amendments of 1962 provided for greater Federal sharing in the cost of rehabilitative services to applicants, recipients, and persons likely to become applicants for public assistance. It increased the Federal share in the cost of public assistance payments, and permitted the States to combine the various categories into one category. The amendments also made permanent the 1961 amendment which extended aid to dependent children to cover children removed from unsuitable homes.
- Federal funds were made available for the payment of foster care costs for AFDC-eligible children who had come into state custody.
- An act was approved (1963) which extended for one year the period during which responsibility for the placement and foster care of dependent children, under the program of aid to families with dependent children under Title IV of the Social Security Act.
- Federal civil service retirement benefits were index-linked to changes in the Consumer Price Index (1962).

=== Civil rights ===
- Various measures were carried out by the Kennedy Justice Department to enforce court orders and existing legislation. The Kennedy Administration promoted a Voter Education Project which led to 688,800 between 1 April 1962 and 1 November 1964, while the Civil Rights Division brought over forty-two suits in four states in order to secure voting rights for Black people. In addition, Kennedy supported the anti-poll tax amendment, which cleared Congress in September 1962 (although it was not ratified until 1964 as the Twenty-fourth Amendment). As noted by one student of Black voting in the South, in relation to the attempts by the Kennedy Administration to promote civil rights, "Whereas the Eisenhower lawyers had moved deliberately, the Kennedy-Johnson attorneys pushed the judiciary far more earnestly."
- Executive Order 10925 (issued in 1961) combined the federal employment and government contractor agencies into a unified Committee on Equal Employment opportunity (CEEO). This new committee helped to put an end to segregation and discriminatory employment practices (such as only employing African Americans for low-skilled jobs) in a number of workplaces across the United States.
- Executive Order 11063 banned discrimination in federally funded housing.
- The Interstate Commerce Commission made Jim Crow illegal in interstate transportation, having been put under pressure to do so by both the Freedom Riders and the Department of Justice.
- Employment of African Americans in federal jobs such as in the Post office, the Navy, and the Veterans Administration as a result of the Kennedy Administration's affirmative action policies.
- The Kennedy Administration forbade government contractors from discriminating against any applicant or employee for employment on the grounds of national origin, color, creed, or race.
- The Plan for Progress was launched by the CEEO to persuade large employers to adopt equal opportunity practices. By 1964 268 firms with 8 million employees had signed on to this, while a nationwide study covering the period from May 1961 to June 1963 of 103 corporations "showed a Negro gain from 28,940 to 42,738 salaried and from 171,021 to 198,161 hourly paid jobs".

=== Housing ===
- The most comprehensive housing and urban renewal program in American history up until that point was carried out, including the first major provisions for middle-income housing, protection of urban open spaces, public mass transit, and private low-income housing.
- The Housing Act of 1961. In March 1961 President Kennedy sent Congress a special message, proposing an ambitious and complex housing program to spur the economy, revitalize cities, and provide affordable housing for middle- and low-income families. The bill proposed spending $3.19 billion and placed major emphasis on improving the existing housing supply, instead of on new housing starts, and creating a cabinet-level Department of Housing and Urban Affairs to oversee the programs. The bill also promised to make the Federal Housing Administration a full partner in urban renewal program by authorizing mortgage loans to finance rehabilitation of homes and urban renewal Committee on housing combined programs for housing, mass transportation, and open space land bills into a single bill.
- Urban renewal grants were increased from $2 to $4 million, while an additional 100,000 units of public housing were constructed.
- Opportunities were provided for coordinated planning of community development: technical assistance to state and local governments.
- Under the Kennedy Administration, there was a change of focus from a wrecker ball approach to small rehabilitation projects in order to preserve existing 'urban textures'.
- Funds for housing for the elderly were increased.
- Title V of the Housing Act was amended (1961) to make nonfarm rural residents eligible for direct housing loans from the Farmers Home Administration. These changes extended the housing program to towns with a population of up to 2,500.
- The Senior Citizens Housing Act (1962) established loans for low-rent apartment projects which were "designed to meet the needs of people age 62 and over".

=== Unemployment ===
- To help the unemployed, Kennedy broadened the distribution of surplus food, created a "pilot" Food Stamp program for poor Americans, directed that preference be given to distressed areas in defense contracts, and expanded the services of U.S. Employment Offices.
- Social security benefits were extended to each child whose father was unemployed.
- The first accelerated public works program for areas of unemployment since the New Deal was launched.
- The first full-scale modernization and expansion of the vocational education laws since 1946 were carried out.
- Federal grants were provided to the states enabling them to extend the period covered by unemployment benefit.
- The Manpower Development and Training Act of 1962 authorized a three-year program aimed at retraining workers displaced by new technology. The bill did not exclude employed workers from benefiting and it authorized a training allowance for unemployed participants. Even though 200,000 people were recruited, there was minimal impact, comparatively. The Area Redevelopment Act, a $394 million spending package passed in 1961, followed a strategy of investing in the private sector to stimulate new job creation. It specifically targeted businesses in urban and rural depressed areas and authorized $4.5 million annually over four years for vocational training programs.
- The 1963 amendments to the National Defense Education Act included $731 million in appropriations to states and localities maintaining vocational training programs.

=== Health ===
- In 1963, Kennedy, who had a mentally ill sister named Rosemary, submitted the nation's first presidential special message to Congress on mental health issues. Congress quickly passed the Mental Retardation Facilities and Community Mental Health Centers Construction Act (P.L. 88-164), beginning a new era in Federal support for mental health services. The National Institute of Mental Health assumed responsibility for monitoring community mental health centers programs. This measure was a great success as there was a sixfold increase in people using Mental Health facilities.
- A Medical Health Bill for the Aged (later known as Medicare) was proposed, but Congress failed to enact it.
- The Community Health Services and Facilities Act (1961) increased the amount of funds available for nursing home construction and extended the research and demonstration grant program to other medical facilities.
- The Health Services for Agricultural Migratory Workers Act (1962) established "a program of federal grants for family clinics and other health services for migrant workers and their families".
- The first major amendments to the food and drug safety laws since 1938 were carried out. The Drug Amendments of 1962 amended the Food, Drug and Cosmetic Act (1938) by strengthening the provisions related to the regulation of therapeutic drugs. The Act required evidence that new drugs proposed for marketing were both safe and effective, and required improved manufacturing processes and procedures.
- The responsibilities of the Food and Drug Administration were significantly enlarged by the Kefauver-Harris Drug Amendments (1962).
- The Vaccination Assistance Act (1962) provided for the vaccination of millions of children against a number of diseases.
- The Social Security Act Amendments of 1963 improved medical services for disabled children and established a new project grant program to improve prenatal care for women from low-income families with very high risks of mental disability and other birth defects. Authorizations for grants to the states under the Maternal and Child Health and Crippled Children's programs were also increased and a research grant program was added.
- The Mental Retardation Facilities Construction Act of 1963 authorized federal support for the construction of university-affiliated training facilities, mental disability research centers, and community service facilities for adults and children with mental disability.

=== Equal rights for women ===
The Presidential Commission on the Status of Women was an advisory commission established on December 14, 1961, by Kennedy to investigate questions regarding women's equality in education, in the workplace, and under the law. The commission, chaired by Eleanor Roosevelt until her death in 1962, was composed of 26 members including legislators, labor union activists and philanthropists who were active in women's rights issues. The main purpose of the committee was to document and examine employment policies in place for women. The commission's final report, American Woman (also known as the Peterson Report after the commission's second chair, Esther Peterson), was issued in October 1963 and documented widespread discrimination against women in the workplace. Among the practices addressed by the group were labor laws pertaining to hours and wages, the quality of legal representation for women, the lack of education and counseling for working women, and federal insurance and tax laws that affected women's incomes. Recommendations included affordable child care for all income levels, hiring practices that promoted equal opportunity for women, and paid maternity leave.

The commission, reflecting the views of Roosevelt and the labor unions, opposed the Equal Rights Amendment (ERA). They feared the ERA would end the special privileges needed by women and accorded to women that were not given to men.

In the early 1960s, full-time working women were paid on average 59 percent of the earnings of their male counterparts. In order to eliminate some forms of sex-based pay discrimination, Kennedy signed the Equal Pay Act into law on June 10, 1963. During the law's first ten years, 171,000 employees received back pay totaling about 84 million dollars.

=== Environment ===
- The Clean Air Act (1963) expanded the powers of the federal government in preventing and controlling air pollution.
- The first major additions to the National Park System since 1946 were made, which included the preservation of wilderness areas and a fund for future acquisitions.
- The water pollution prevention program was doubled.
- More aid was provided to localities to combat water pollution.
- The Rivers and Harbors Act of 1962 reiterated and expanded upon "previous authorizations for outdoor recreation."

=== Agriculture ===
- A new Housing Act of 1961 extended the Farmers Home Administration housing loan assistance for the first time to nonfarm rural residents and providers of low-cost housing for domestic farm laborers. The Farmers Home Administration was therefore able to expand its rural housing loans from less than $70 million to nearly $500 million in 1965, or about enough to provide for 50,000 new or rehabilitated housing units.
- A 1962 farm bill expanded government food donation programs at home and abroad and provided federal aid to farmers who converted crop land to nonfarm income-producing uses.
- Title III of the Food and Agriculture Act of 1962 consolidated and expanded existing loan programs, thereby providing the Farmers Home Administration with increased flexibility in helping a broader spectrum of credit-risky farmers to purchase land and amass working capital. In addition, the Farmers Home Administration assumed responsibility for community water system loans.
- Under the Rural Renewal Program of 1962, the USDA provided technical and financial assistance for locally initiated and sponsored programs aimed at ending chronic underemployment and fostering a sound rural economy. Loans were made to local groups to establish small manufacturing plants, to build hospitals, to establish recreation areas, and to carry out similar developmental activities.

=== Crime ===
Under Kennedy, the first significant package of anticrime bills since 1934 were passed. The Kennedy Administration's anticrime measures included the Juvenile Delinquency and Youth Offenses Control Act, which was signed into law on September 22, 1961. This program aimed to prevent youth from committing delinquent acts. In 1963, 288 mobsters were brought to trial by a team that was headed by Kennedy's brother, Robert.

=== Defense ===
The Kennedy administration with its new Secretary of Defense, Robert S. McNamara, gave a strong priority to countering communist political subversion and guerrilla tactics in the "wars of national liberation" to decolonize the Third World, long held in Western vassalage. As well as fighting and winning a nuclear war, the American military was also trained and equipped for counterinsurgency operations. Though the U.S. Army Special Forces had been created in 1952, Kennedy visited the Fort Bragg U.S. Army Special Warfare Center in a blaze of publicity and gave his permission for the Special Forces to adopt the green beret. The other services launched their own counterinsurgency forces in 1961; the U.S. Air Force created the 1st Air Commando Group and the U.S. Navy created the Navy Seals.

The U.S. military increased in size and faced possible confrontation with the Soviets with the construction of the Berlin Wall in 1961 and with the Cuban Missile Crisis in 1962. American troops were sent to Laos and South Vietnam in increasing numbers. The United States provided a clandestine operation to supply military aid and support to Cuban exiles in the disastrous Bay of Pigs Invasion.

== In popular culture ==
Both Frankie Laine and The Brothers Four released 1962 songs entitled The New Frontier.

Donald Fagen released a song titled "New Frontier" on his 1982 album The Nightfly.

The Speech was played at the end of the DC animated Movie Justice League: The New Frontier released in 2008

== See also ==
- "We choose to go to the Moon"
- Inauguration of John F. Kennedy
- High modernism
- Techno-progressivism
- American pioneer
- Frontier thesis
- Endless Frontier Act
