= Benjamin Rosenthal =

American politician (1923–1983)

Ben Rosenthal
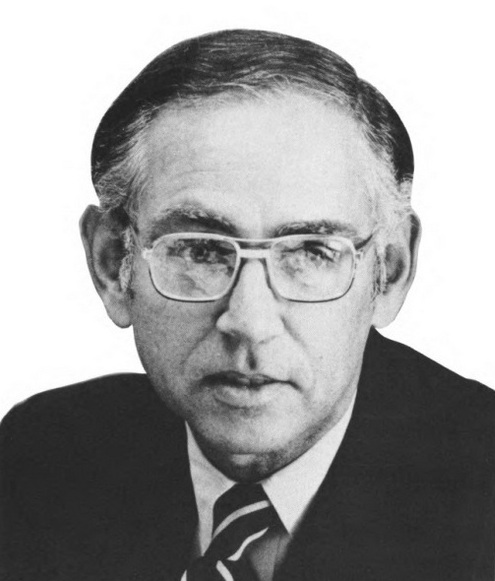

Member of the U.S. House of Representatives from New York
- In office February 20, 1962 – January 4, 1983
- Preceded by: Lester Holtzman
- Succeeded by: Gary Ackerman
- Constituency: 6th district (1962–1963); 8th district (1963–1983); 7th district (1983)

Personal details
- Born: Benjamin Stanley Rosenthal; June 8, 1923 New York City, New York, U.S.
- Died: January 4, 1983 (aged 59) Washington, D.C., U.S.
- Cause of death: Cancer
- Resting place: Beth David Cemetery, Elmont, New York, U.S.
- Party: Democratic
- Education: New York University

Benjamin Stanley Rosenthal (June 8, 1923 – January 4, 1983) was an American Democratic Party politician from New York who represented the northern portion of Queens during twelve congressional terms, from 1962 until his death. Upon his death at age 59, he was the third-most senior representative in the New York delegation.

== Biography ==
Born in New York City, Rosenthal attended public schools (including Stuyvesant High School), Long Island University and the City College of New York.

=== Military service and higher education ===
He served in the United States Army from 1943 to 1946. Thereafter, he received his LL.B. from Brooklyn Law School in 1949 and an LL.M. from New York University in 1952. He was admitted to the New York bar in 1949 and commenced practice in New York City.

=== Congress ===
Rosenthal was elected as a Democrat to the Eighty-seventh United States Congress, filling the vacancy caused by the resignation of Representative Lester Holtzman. Taking office on February 20, 1962, he was re-elected that fall, and then again to ten succeeding Congresses.

Rosenthal was a "regular" or machine Democrat, but held liberal views, opposing the Vietnam War early on and working on consumer protection issues.

On May 17, 1962, Rosenthal read a statement into the Congressional Record praising the magazine Mad on its tenth anniversary. (Rosenthal's district, NY-8, included the part of Manhattan where Mad's offices were.) "Mad Magazine...for the last 10 years has humorously pointed out the laughable foibles of business, labor, advertising, television, sports and entertainment – to say nothing of politics," Rosenthal said.

== Death and burial ==
Rosenthal was re-elected again in 1982, but died from complications of cancer at Georgetown University Hospital on January 4, 1983, just one day after the 98th United States Congress met for the first time. He was sworn in to that Congress from his hospital bed.

Rosenthal is buried in Beth David Cemetery in Elmont, New York.

On March 1, Gary Ackerman was elected to the seat and held it through 2013.

== Legacy ==
The Benjamin S. Rosenthal Library at Queens College, City University of New York, is named in his honor. Rosenthal's papers are held by the library's Department of Special Collections and Archives.

== See also ==
- List of Jewish members of the United States Congress
- List of members of the United States Congress who died in office (1950–1999)

U.S. House of Representatives
Preceded by Lester Holtzman	Member of the U.S. House of Representatives from New York's 6th congressional district 1962–1963	Succeeded by Seymour Halpern
Preceded by Victor L. Anfuso	Member of the U.S. House of Representatives from New York's 8th congressional district 1963–1983	Succeeded by James H. Scheuer
Preceded by Joseph P. Addabbo	Member of the U.S. House of Representatives from New York's 7th congressional district 1983	Succeeded by Gary Ackerman
