= Pete Visclosky =

American politician (born 1949)

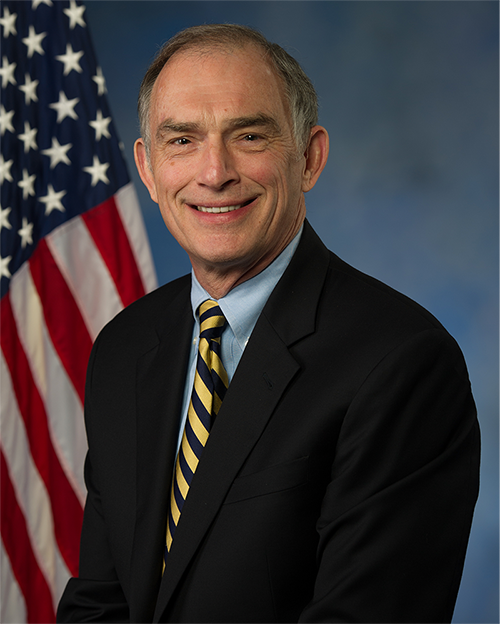

Member of the U.S. House of Representatives from Indiana's 1st district
- In office January 3, 1985 – January 3, 2021
- Preceded by: Katie Hall
- Succeeded by: Frank Mrvan

Personal details
- Born: Peter John Visclosky; August 13, 1949 (age 76) Gary, Indiana, U.S.
- Party: Democratic
- Spouse: Joanne Royce
- Education: Indiana University, Northwest (BA); University of Notre Dame (JD); Georgetown University (LLM)
- Visclosky's voice Visclosky opposing the surge of American troops in Iraq. Recorded February 15, 2007

Peter John Visclosky (/vɪˈsklɒski/ vih-SKLOSS-kee; born August 13, 1949) is an American politician who served as the U.S. representative for Indiana's 1st congressional district from 1985 until his retirement in 2021. He is a member of the Democratic Party and was the dean of the Indiana congressional delegation from 2013 until his retirement in 2021. The District lies in Northwest Indiana, and includes most of the Indiana side of the Chicago metropolitan area. Redistricting passed by the Indiana General Assembly in 2011 changed the district's boundaries, effective January 2013, to include all of Lake and Porter counties as well as the western and northwestern townships of LaPorte County, while shifting Benton, Newton, and Jasper counties out of the district.

On November 6, 2019, Visclosky announced that he would not seek re-election in 2020.

== Early life, education, and pre-congressional career ==
Visclosky was born in Gary, Indiana, the son of John and the late Helen (née Kauzlaric) Visclosky. He is of Croatian-Slovak descent. He was educated at Andrean High School in Merrillville, Indiana. He earned a Bachelor of Science in accounting at Indiana University Northwest in Gary, Indiana and went on to earn his juris doctor from Notre Dame Law School. At Georgetown University in Washington, D.C., Visclosky earned a Master of Laws in International and Comparative Law. He worked as a lawyer and staff member of United States Representative Adam Benjamin before entering the House.

== U.S. House of Representatives ==
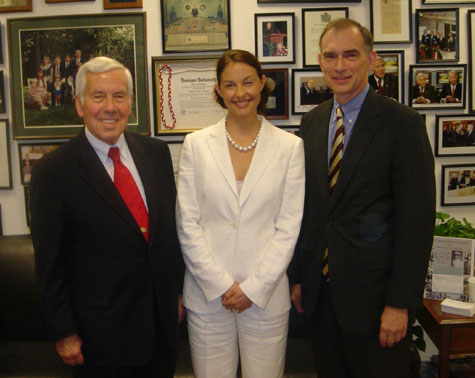
Visclosky with Richard Lugar and Ashley Judd in 2005

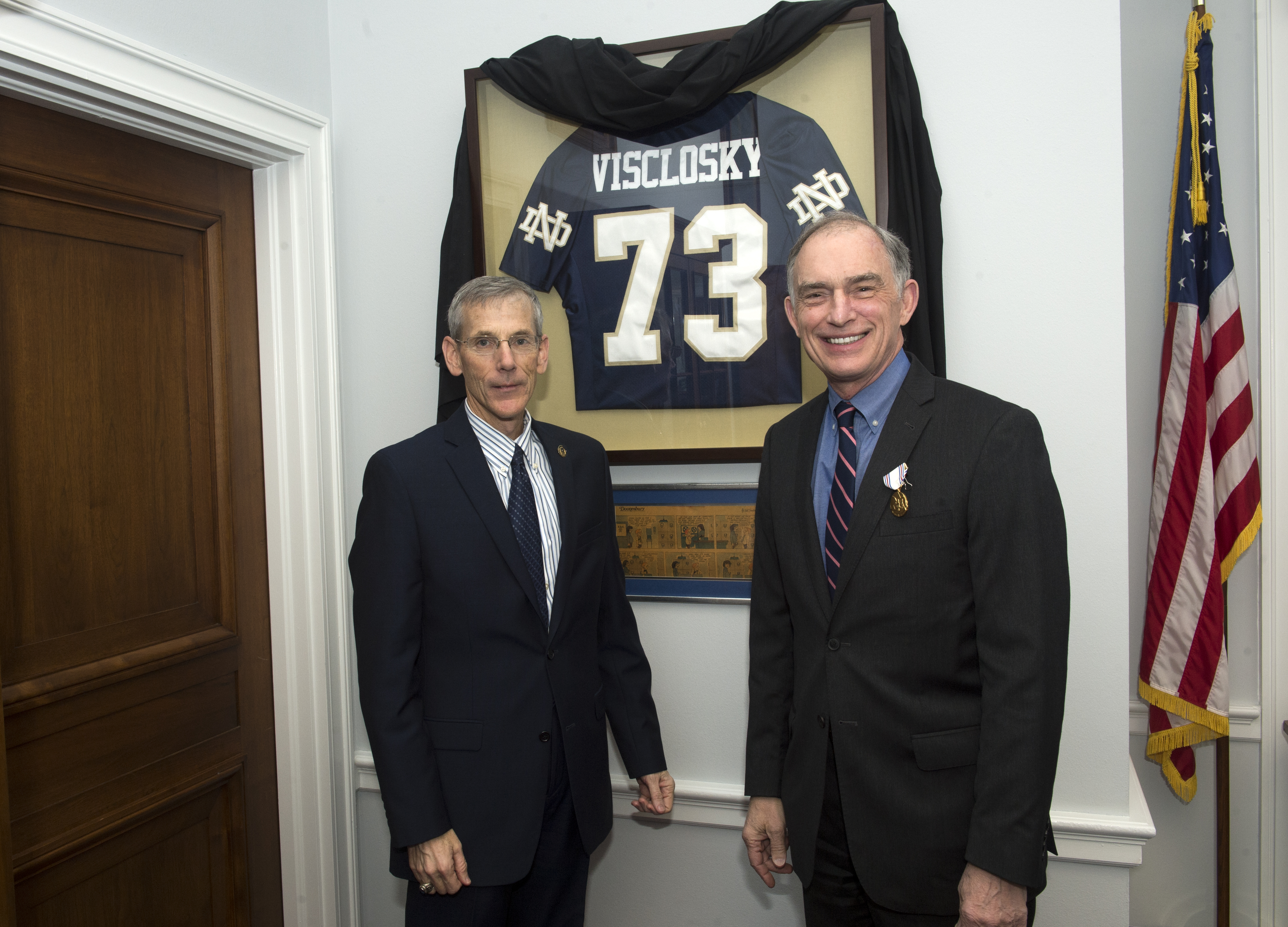
Visclosky with Acting Secretary of the Army Robert M. Speer, 2017

=== Elections ===
In 1984, Visclosky ran for Congress in Indiana's 1st congressional district. In the Democratic primary, he defeated incumbent U.S. Congresswoman Katie Hall, Jack Crawford, and Sandra Smith 34%-33%-31%-1%. In the general election, he defeated Republican Joseph Grenchik 71%-29%. He was reelected 17 times from a district that has been in Democratic hands without interruption since 1931.

In 1986, he won the Democratic primary again with 57%, defeating Hall and three other candidates. He won the general election with 73% of the vote. In 1988, he won the Democratic primary 84%-16% against Sandra Smith. He went on to win the general election with 77% of the vote.

In 1990, Hall challenged Visclosky for the third time and was defeated 51%-30%. He won the general election with 66% of the vote. In 1992, he won the Democratic primary with 72% and the general election with 69%. In 1994, he won the Democratic primary with 77% of the vote. In the general election, he defeated Republican John Larson 56%-44%.

For the rest of his career, he never won a primary with less than 71% and he only once won a general election with less than 60% of the vote - in 2010, when Republicans re-took control of the House of Representatives.

=== Tenure ===
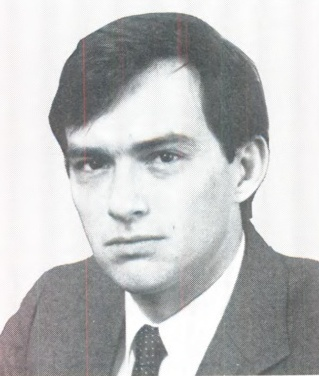
Visclosky as a freshman during the 99th Congress

Rep. Visclosky, Gary Mayor Rudy Clay, Sen. Evan Bayh, Maj. Gen. R. Martin Umbarger, and Gov. Mitch Daniels at ribbon cutting of the Gary Limited Army Aviation Support Facility on Oct. 24, 2008

Visclosky had pro-union and anti free trade legislative record. He supported reinstating the steel tariff, fighting against illegal actions known as "Steel Dumping", in which countries undercut American steel prices by subsidizing steel production, and/or producing steel through nationalized steel companies, which artificially manipulates the market price of steel produced in this manner, a violation of trade agreements, free markets, and certain international laws, and fighting to save American manufacturing jobs have long been priorities of Visclosky. He often served as Chair of the Congressional Steel Caucus when the Democrats held control of the House, and serves as Vice Chair when they did not. He was also at one point Chair of the Energy and Water Development Subcommittee and the current Ranking Member. Congressman Visclosky also opposed actions that would have certain components of advanced U.S. Military weapons and hardware made in foreign countries, most notably in China, which caused the closing of U.S.-based manufacturing centers, such as "Magnequench" in Valparaiso, Indiana, which was covered heavily in the media, most notably in printed media from his district, namely "The Times" and "The Post Tribune", both servicing Northwest Indiana. In this particular case, the component was a sophisticated, high-tech magnet, made of rare earth metals, that is an integral part of U.S. smart-bombs and guided missile systems, including the "Joint Direct Attack Munition" or "JDAM".

Visclosky was one of the 126 Democrats who voted against the Iraq War Resolution. He was also a supporter of high tech solutions as a way to revive the American blue collar work force, and as a way to decrease crime.

Visclocsky was a prime proponent of expanding Gary/Chicago International Airport's runway, and played a role in the securing of $58 million in federal funding to do so in 2006.

=== Indiana's Lake Michigan shoreline ===
During his tenure, one of Visclosky's focuses had been improving Indiana's Lake Michigan shoreline.

In 1985, during his first term, Visclosky proposed the "Marquette Plan", which would have seen 75% of Northwest Indiana's industrial shoreline reclaimed for public uses. Two decades later, he revived the proposal in a revised form, as the "Marquette Greenway", which would have seen bike trails built along the lakefront. While the overall "Marquette Plan" has not been realized, a number of projects have reclaimed some of the industrial lakefront, such as the Portage Lakefront and Riverwalk.

In 2019, Visclosky added a measure making Indiana Dunes a United States National Park to an appropriations bill, which passed into law. Indiana Dunes thereby became the 61st National Park.

=== South Shore Line improvements ===
A large focus of Visclosky during his tenure was improving the South Shore Line rail service. Visclosky managed to help secure federal funding for a number of improvements to the South Shore Line throughout his tenure, including funding for new overpasses and bridges. In his last term as a congressman, two major projects Visclosky had long advocated for to improve the South Shore Line, double tracking on the existing main branch and the construction of the new Monon Corridor, received federal funding.

=== PMA Group investigation ===
The Washington Times reported in March 2009 that Visclosky had received, over ten years, $1.36 million in campaign donations from clients of the PMA Group. In 2007 and 2008, the United States House Committee on Appropriations, of which Visclosky is a member, directed $137 million in government purchasing to PMA's clients. In May 2009, Visclosky received subpoenas in the grand jury investigation into PMA Group, the first member of Congress to be subpoenaed in the investigation. The Congressman was later cleared of all charges by the House Ethics Committee, who detailed in a 305-page report that "Simply because a member sponsors an earmark for an entity that also happens to be a campaign contributor does not, on these two facts alone, support a claim that a member's actions are being influenced by campaign contributions".

Steven V. Roberts and Cokie Roberts called the Visclosky/PMA/Sierra Nevada Corporation relationship "a bribe by any other name".

In 2011, the House Ethics Committee ended its investigation, clearing Visclosky and Republican former Representative Todd Tiahrt of Kansas. While "PMA's lobbyists pushed or directed company executives to maximize personal or Political Action Committee (PAC) campaign contributions and to attend specific fundraisers while pursuing earmarks," the report notes, "the evidence did not show that Members or their official staff were included in discussions or correspondence about, coordinated with PMA on, or knew of these strategies."

=== Committee assignments ===
- Committee on Appropriations
  - Subcommittee on Defense (chair)
  - Subcommittee on Energy and Water Development

=== Caucus memberships ===
- Congressional Steel Caucus (Vice Chair)
- Congressional Caucus on Armenian Issues
- Congressional Caucus on India and Indian Americans
- Congressional Diabetes Caucus
- Congressional Fire Services Caucus
- Congressional Hellenic Caucus
- Congressional Serbian Caucus
- Great Lakes Task Force
- Missing, Exploited, and Runaway Children Caucus
- Northeast-Midwest Congressional Coalition
- Buy America Caucus
- Dairy Farmers Caucus
- French Caucus
- Macedonian Caucus
- National Parks Caucus
- Slovak Caucus
- Friends of Switzerland
- Wine Caucus
- Wire and Wire Products Caucus
- Law Enforcement Caucus
- Congressional Arts Caucus
- U.S.-Japan Caucus

== Subsequent career ==
In January 2022, Indiana Governor Eric Holcomb appointed Visclosky to serve as chairman of the Gary/Chicago Airport Authority.

== Electoral history ==
Indiana's 1st congressional district: Results 1984–2018
| Year | Democratic | Votes | % | Republican | Votes | % | Third Party | Party | Votes | % | Third Party | Party | Votes | % |
|---|---|---|---|---|---|---|---|---|---|---|---|---|---|---|
| 1984 | Pete Visclosky | 147,035 | 71% | Joseph Grenchik | 59,986 | 29% | James Willis | Libertarian | 943 | 0% | | | | |
| 1986 | Pete Visclosky | 86,983 | 73% | William P. Costas | 30,395 | 26% | James Willis | Libertarian | 660 | 1% | Tracy Kyle | Workers League | 403 | 0% |
| 1988 | Pete Visclosky | 138,251 | 77% | Owen Crumpacker | 41,076 | 23% | | | | | | | | |
| 1990 | Pete Visclosky | 68,920 | 66% | William P. Costas | 35,450 | 34% | | | | | | | | |
| 1992 | Pete Visclosky | 147,054 | 69% | David Vucich | 64,770 | 31% | | | | | | | | |
| 1994 | Pete Visclosky | 68,612 | 56% | John Larson | 52,920 | 44% | | | | | | | | |
| 1996 | Pete Visclosky | 133,553 | 69% | Michael Petyo | 56,418 | 29% | Michael Crass | Libertarian | 3,142 | 2% | | | | |
| 1998 | Pete Visclosky | 92,634 | 73% | Michael Petyo | 33,503 | 26% | Michael Crass | Libertarian | 1,617 | 1% | | | | |
| 2000 | Pete Visclosky | 148,683 | 72% | Jack Reynolds | 56,200 | 27% | Christopher Nelson | Libertarian | 2,907 | 1% | | | | |
| 2002 | Pete Visclosky | 90,443 | 67% | Mark Leyva | 41,909 | 31% | Timothy Brennan | Libertarian | 2,759 | 2% | | | | |
| 2004 | Pete Visclosky | 178,406 | 68% | Mark Leyva | 82,858 | 32% | | | | | | | | |
| 2006 | Pete Visclosky | 104,195 | 70% | Mark Leyva | 40,146 | 27% | Charles Barman | Independent | 5,266 | 4% | | | | |
| 2008 | Pete Visclosky | 199,954 | 71% | Mark Leyva | 76,647 | 27% | Timothy Brennan | Libertarian | 5,421 | 2% | | | | |
| 2010 | Pete Visclosky | 99,387 | 59% | Mark Leyva | 65,558 | 39% | Jon Morris | Libertarian | 4,762 | 3% | | | | |
| 2012 | Pete Visclosky | 187,743 | 67% | Joel Phelps | 91,291 | 33% | | | | | | | | |
| 2014 | Pete Visclosky | 86,579 | 61% | Mark Leyva | 51,000 | 36% | Donna Dunn | Libertarian | 4,714 | 3% | | | | |
| 2016 | Pete Visclosky | 207,515 | 82% | | | | Donna Dunn | Libertarian | 47,051 | 18% | John Meyer | Independent | 17 | 0% |
| 2018 | Pete Visclosky | 159,611 | 65% | Mark Leyva | 85,594 | 35% | | | | | | | | |

== Personal life ==
Visclosky is married to Joanne Royce and has two sons, John and Tim. He is a Roman Catholic.

U.S. House of Representatives
| Preceded by Katie Hall | Member of the U.S. House of Representatives from Indiana's 1st congressional district 1985–2021 | Succeeded by Frank J. Mrvan |
U.S. order of precedence (ceremonial)
| Preceded by Nick Rahall as Former U.S. Representative | Order of precedence of the United States as Former U.S. Representative | Succeeded by Sander Levin as Former U.S. Representative |
