= 97th United States Congress =

1981–1983 U.S. Congress

←	96th	98th	→
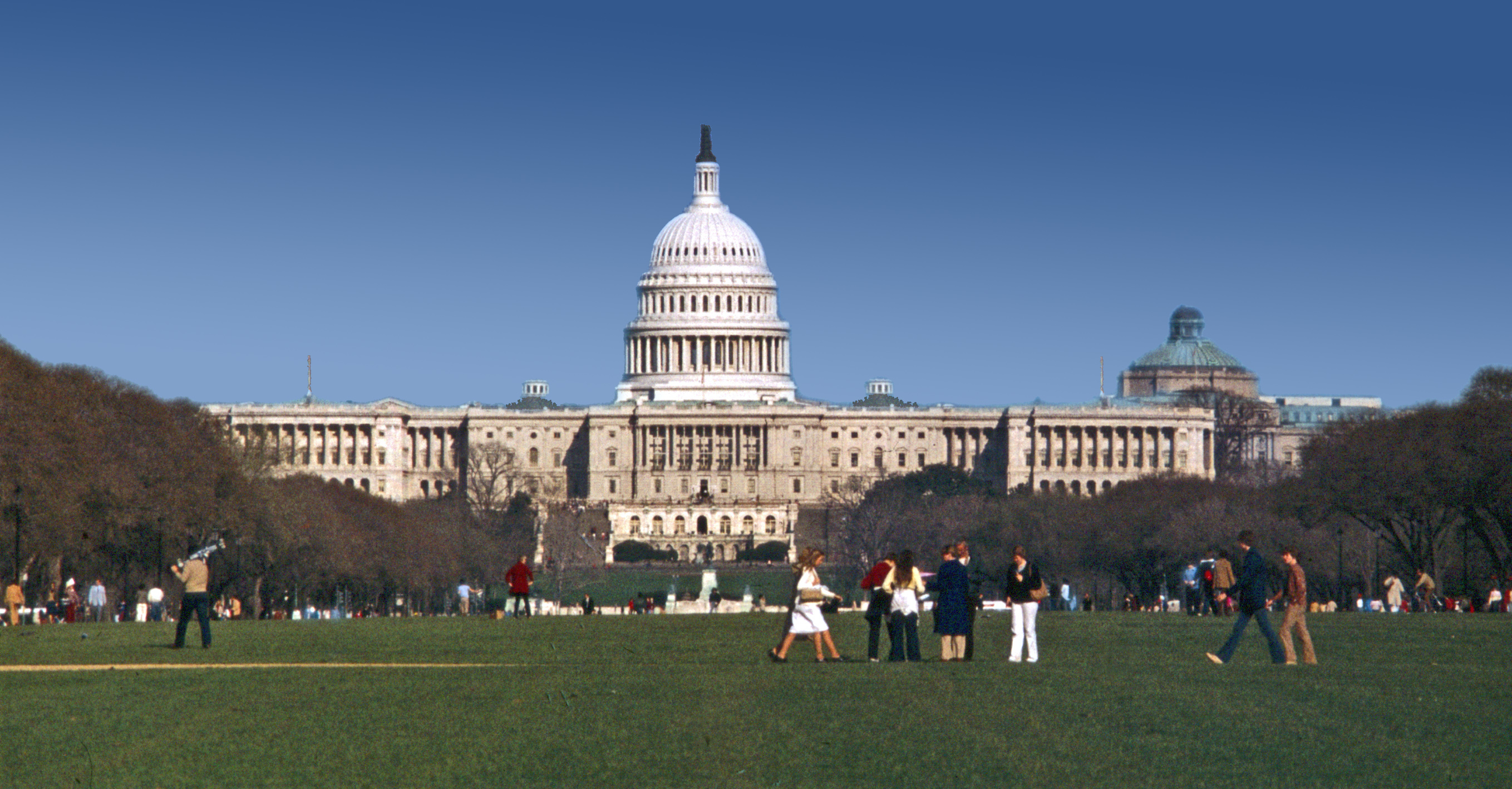
- United States Capitol (1980)

Overview
- Legislative body: United States Congress
- Jurisdiction: United States
- Term: January 3, 1981 – January 3, 1983

Senate
- Members: 100
- President: Walter Mondale (D) (Note: U.S. Vice President Walter Mondale's term as President of the Senate ended at noon on January 20, 1981, when George H. W. Bush's term began.) (until January 20, 1981); George H. W. Bush (R) (from January 20, 1981)
- President pro tempore: Strom Thurmond (R)
- Party control: Republican

House of Representatives
- Members: 435 representatives 5 non-voting delegates
- Speaker: Tip O'Neill (D)
- Party control: Democratic

Sessions
- 1st: January 5, 1981 – December 16, 1981
- 2nd: January 25, 1982 – December 23, 1982

The 97th United States Congress was a meeting of the legislative branch of the United States federal government, composed of the United States Senate and the United States House of Representatives. It met in Washington, D.C., from January 3, 1981, to January 3, 1983, during the final weeks of Jimmy Carter's presidency and the first two years of Ronald Reagan's presidency. The apportionment of seats in the House of Representatives was based on the 1970 United States census.

While the House of Representatives retained a Democratic majority (albeit reduced from the 96th Congress), Republicans gained control of the Senate, marking the first time that they had control of either chamber of Congress since the 83rd Congress in 1953.

== Major events ==
- Early 1980s recession
- January 20, 1981: Inauguration of President Ronald Reagan
- January 20, 1981: Iran hostage crisis ended
- February 18, 1981: President Reagan addressed a joint session of Congress
- March 30, 1981: Reagan assassination attempt
- April 12, 1981: First space shuttle launched
- June 5, 1981: First recognized case of AIDS
- August 5, 1981: President Reagan fired the air traffic controllers
- September 21, 1981: Senate confirmed the first female United States Supreme Court justice, Sandra Day O'Connor
- April 21, 1982: Queen Beatrix of the Netherlands addressed a joint meeting of Congress.
- November 2, 1982: United States general elections; Republicans retained Senate and Democrats increased control in House.

== Major legislation ==
- August 13, 1981: Economic Recovery Tax Act (ERTA or Kemp-Roth Tax Cut), Pub. L. 97–34, 95 Stat. 172
- August 13, 1981: Omnibus Budget Reconciliation Act of 1981, Pub. L. 97–35, 95 Stat. 357
- September 3, 1982: Tax Equity and Fiscal Responsibility Act of 1982, Pub. L. 97–248, 96 Stat. 324
- September 8, 1982: Uniformed Services Former Spouses' Protection Act (USFSPA), Pub. L. 97–252, 96 Stat. 718
- September 13, 1982: Codification of Title 31 of the United States Code, "Money and Finance", Pub. L. 97–258, 96 Stat. 877
- September 20, 1982: Bus Regulatory Reform Act, Pub. L. 97–261, 96 Stat. 1102
- October 13, 1982: Job Training Partnership Act of 1982, Pub. L. 97–300, 96 Stat. 1322
- October 15, 1982: Garn–St. Germain Depository Institutions Act, Pub. L. 97–320, 96 Stat. 1469
- January 6, 1983: Surface Transportation Assistance Act of 1982, Pub. L. 97–424

== Special or select committees ==
- Senate Select Committee on Small Business — Became a standing committee on March 25, 1981
- United States Senate Select Committee on Law Enforcement Undercover Activities of the Justice Department — March 24, 1982 – December 15, 1982

== Party summary ==
=== Senate ===
Party standings on the opening day of the 97th Congress 46 Democratic senators 1 independent senator, caucusing with Democrats 53 Republican senators

	Party (shading shows control)			Total	Vacant
	Democratic (D)	Independent (I)	Republican (R)	Total	Vacant
End of previous congress	55	1	44	100	0
Begin	46	1	53	100	0
End	46	1	53	100	0
Final voting share	46.0%	1.0%	53.0%		
Beginning of next congress	46	0	54	100	0

=== House of Representatives ===
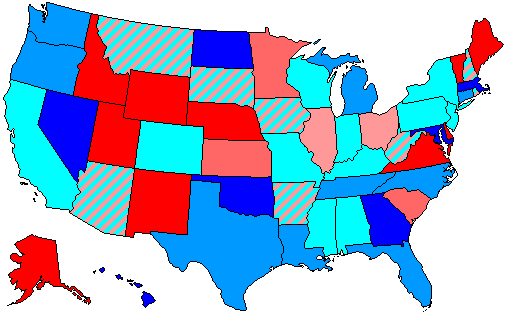
House seats by party holding plurality in state: 80+% Democratic / 80+% Republican; 60+% to 80% Democratic / 60+% to 80% Republican; 50+% to 60% Democratic / 50+% to 60% Republican; (Striped): even split

	Party (shading shows control)			Total	Vacant
	Democratic (D)	Republican (R)	Conservative (C)	Total	Vacant
End of previous congress	272	158	1	431	4
Begin	243	191	1	435	0
End	242	191	1	434	1
Final voting share	55.8%	44.0%	0.2%		
Beginning of next congress	269	164	1	434	1

== Leadership ==
=== Senate ===
Senate President

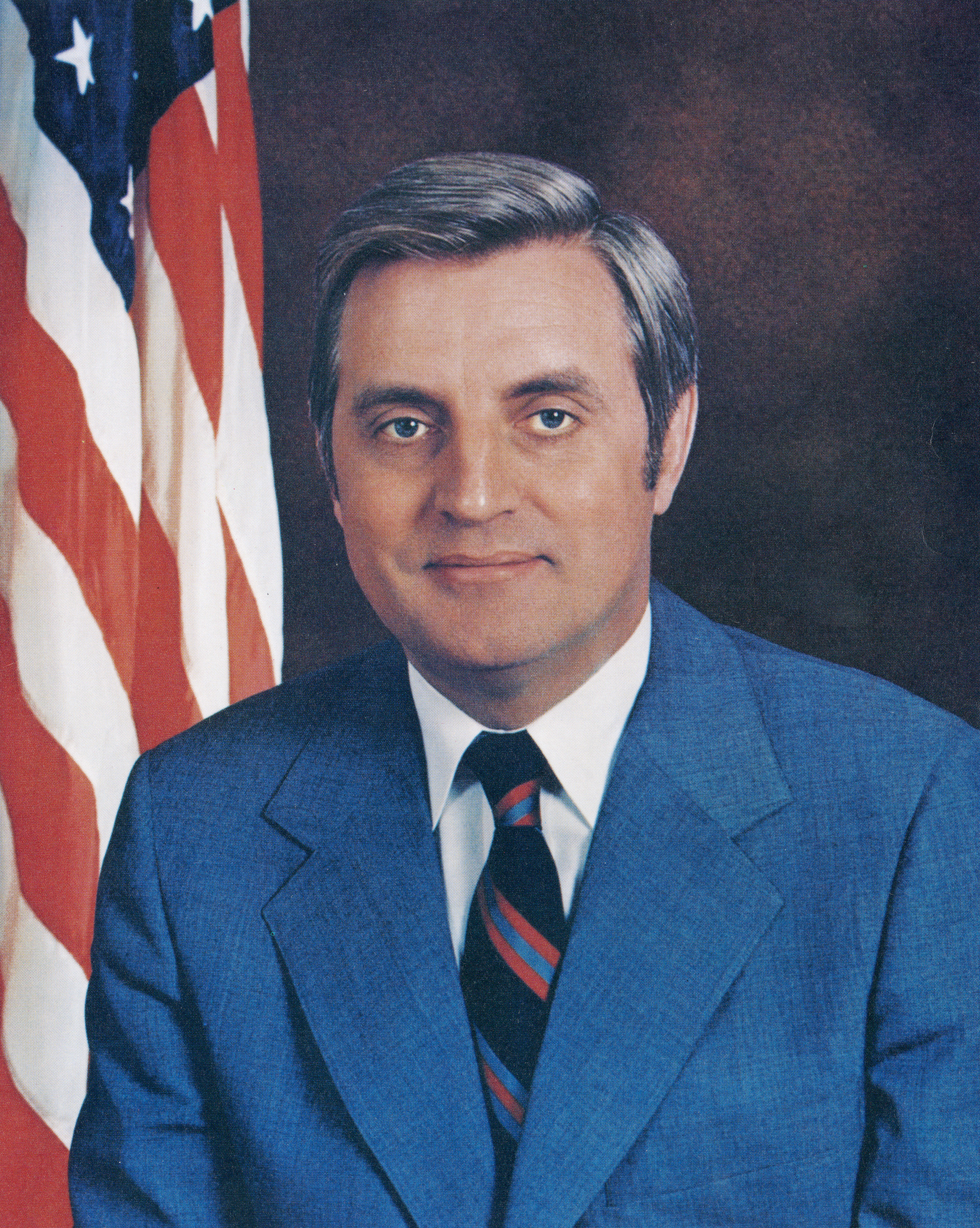
Walter Mondale (D),
until January 20, 1981

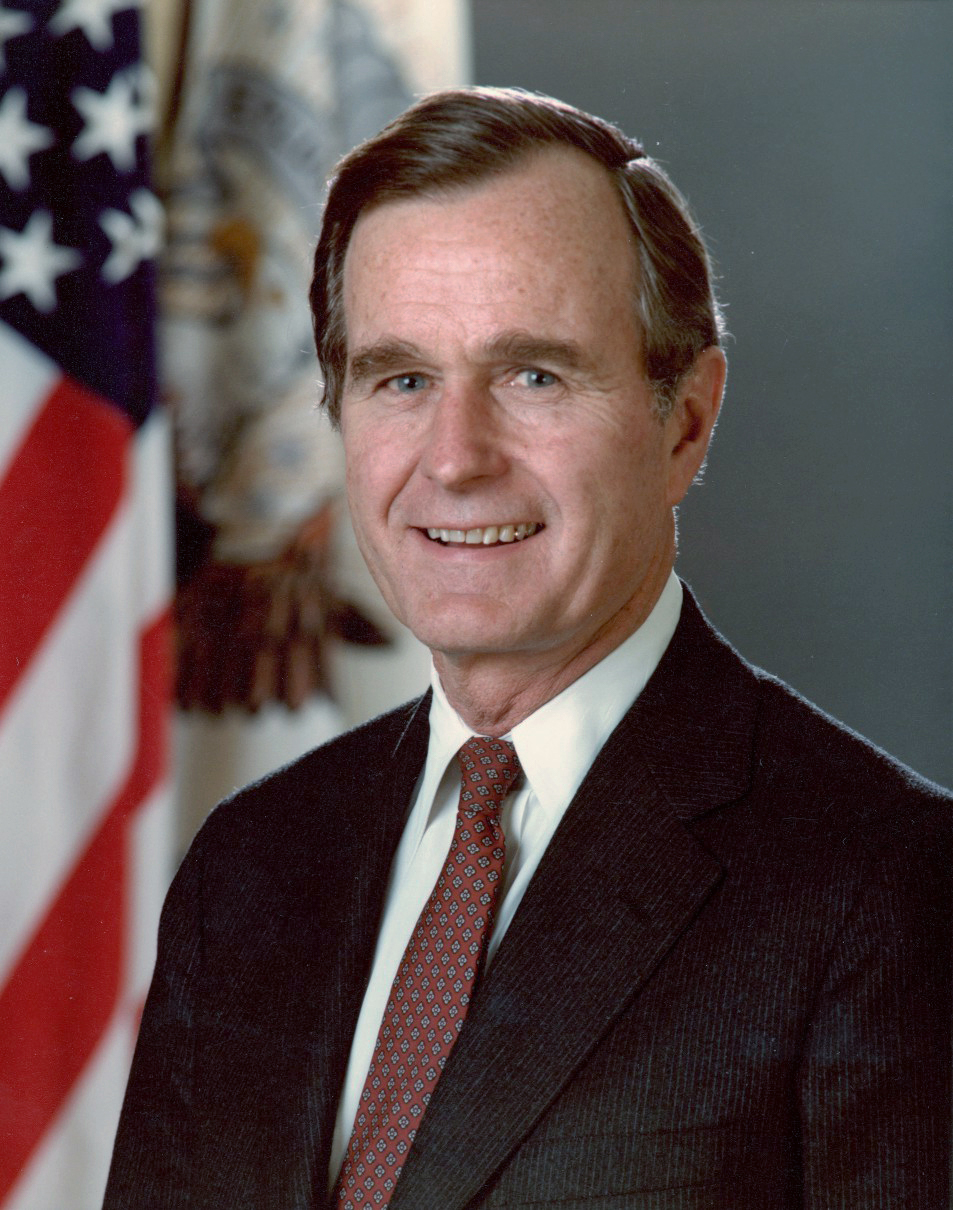
George H. W. Bush (R),
from January 20, 1981

- President: Walter Mondale (D), until January 20, 1981
  - George H. W. Bush (R), from January 20, 1981
- President pro tempore: Strom Thurmond (R)

==== Majority (Republican) leadership ====
- Majority Leader: Howard Baker
- Majority Whip: Ted Stevens
- Republican Conference Chairman: James A. McClure
- Republican Conference Secretary: Jake Garn
- National Senatorial Committee Chair: Bob Packwood
- Policy Committee Chairman: John Tower

==== Minority (Democratic) leadership ====
- Minority Leader: Robert Byrd
- Minority Whip: Alan Cranston
- Democratic Caucus Secretary: Daniel Inouye
- Democratic Campaign Committee Chairman: Wendell Ford

=== House of Representatives ===
House Speaker

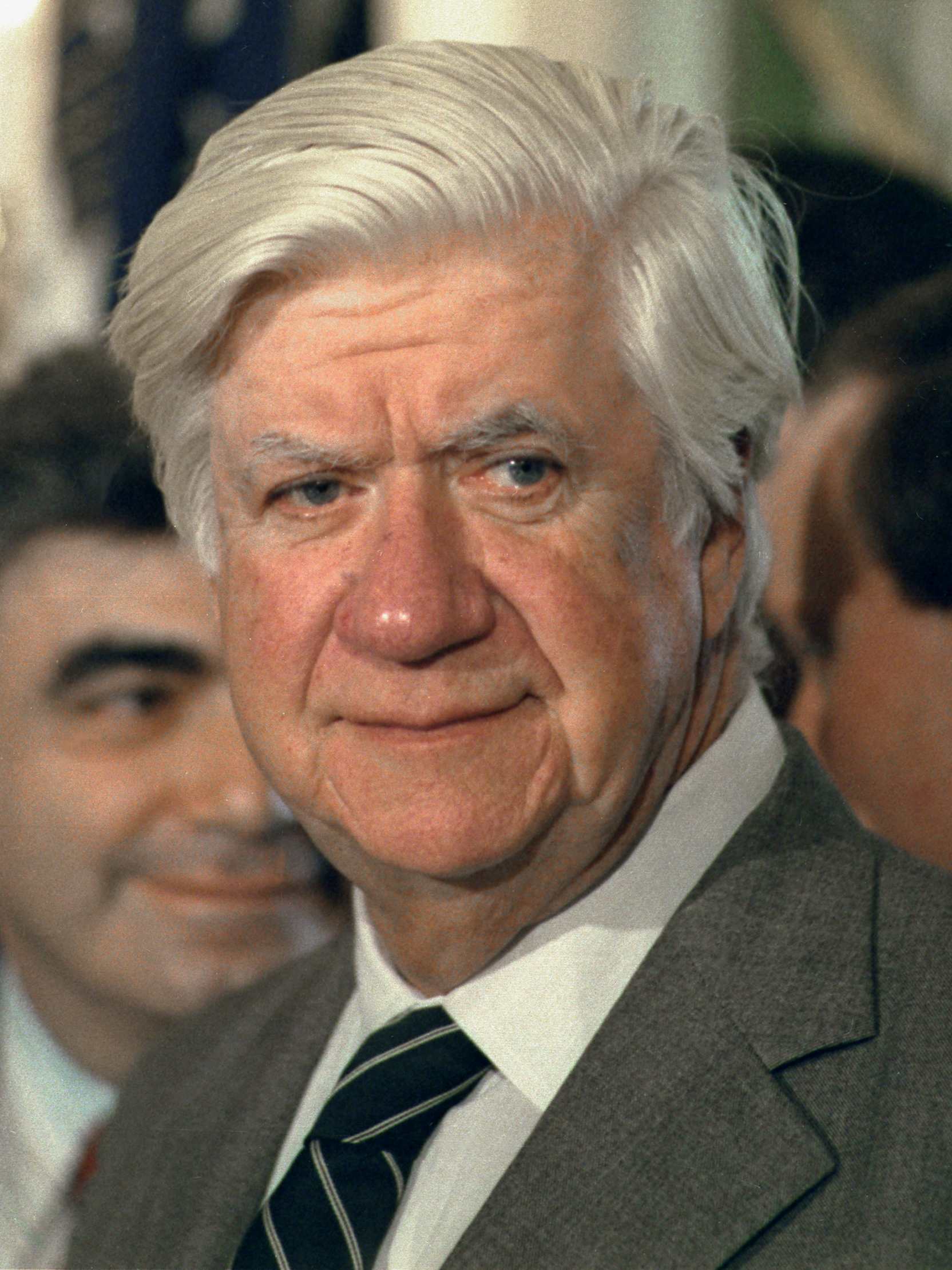
Tip O'Neill (D)

- Speaker: Tip O'Neill (D)

==== Majority (Democratic) leadership ====
- Majority Leader: Jim Wright
- Majority Whip: Tom Foley
- Chief Deputy Majority Whip: William Vollie Alexander Jr.
- Democratic Caucus Chairman: Gillis William Long
- Democratic Caucus Secretary: Geraldine Ferraro
- Democratic Campaign Committee Chairman: Tony Coelho

==== Minority (Republican) leadership ====
- Minority Leader: Robert H. Michel
- Minority Whip: Trent Lott
- Chief Deputy Whip: David F. Emery
- Republican Conference Chairman: Jack Kemp
- Republican Conference Vice-Chairman: Jack Edwards
- Republican Conference Secretary: Clair Burgener
- Policy Committee Chairman: Dick Cheney
- Republican Campaign Committee Chairman: Guy Vander Jagt

== Caucuses ==
- Congressional Arts Caucus
- Congressional Black Caucus
- Congressional Friends of Ireland Caucus
- Congressional Hispanic Caucus
- Congressional Travel & Tourism Caucus
- Congresswomen's Caucus
- House Democratic Caucus
- Senate Democratic Caucus

== Members ==
This list is arranged by chamber, then by state. Senators are listed by class, and representatives are listed by district.

The age distribution of members of the 97th US Congress was younger than later Congresses.

=== Senate ===
Senators are popularly elected statewide every two years, with one-third beginning new six-year terms with each Congress, In this Congress, Class 1 meant their term ended with this Congress, requiring reelection in 1982; Class 2 meant their term began in the last Congress, requiring reelection in 1984; and Class 3 meant their term began in this Congress, requiring reelection in 1986.

==== Alabama ====
▌2. Howell Heflin (D)
▌3. Jeremiah Denton (R)

==== Alaska ====
▌2. Ted Stevens (R)
▌3. Frank Murkowski (R)

==== Arizona ====
▌1. Dennis DeConcini (D)
▌3. Barry Goldwater (R)

==== Arkansas ====
▌2. David Pryor (D)
▌3. Dale Bumpers (D)

==== California ====
▌1. S. I. Hayakawa (R)
▌3. Alan Cranston (D)

==== Colorado ====
▌2. William L. Armstrong (R)
▌3. Gary Hart (D)

==== Connecticut ====
▌1. Lowell Weicker (R)
▌3. Chris Dodd (D)

==== Delaware ====
▌1. William Roth (R)
▌2. Joe Biden (D)

==== Florida ====
▌1. Lawton Chiles (D)
▌3. Paula Hawkins (R)

==== Georgia ====
▌2. Sam Nunn (D)
▌3. Mack Mattingly (R)

==== Hawaii ====
▌1. Spark Matsunaga (D)
▌3. Daniel Inouye (D)

==== Idaho ====
▌2. James A. McClure (R)
▌3. Steve Symms (R)

==== Illinois ====
▌2. Charles H. Percy (R)
▌3. Alan J. Dixon (D)

==== Indiana ====
▌1. Richard Lugar (R)
▌3. Dan Quayle (R)

==== Iowa ====
▌2. Roger Jepsen (R)
▌3. Chuck Grassley (R)

==== Kansas ====
▌2. Nancy Kassebaum (R)
▌3. Bob Dole (R)

==== Kentucky ====
▌2. Walter Dee Huddleston (D)
▌3. Wendell Ford (D)

==== Louisiana ====
▌2. J. Bennett Johnston (D)
▌3. Russell B. Long (D)

==== Maine ====
▌1. George J. Mitchell (D)
▌2. William Cohen (R)

==== Maryland ====
▌1. Paul Sarbanes (D)
▌3. Charles Mathias (R)

==== Massachusetts ====
▌1. Ted Kennedy (D)
▌2. Paul Tsongas (D)

==== Michigan ====
▌1. Donald Riegle (D)
▌2. Carl Levin (D)

==== Minnesota ====
▌1. David Durenberger (I-R) (Note: The Republican Party of Minnesota was officially known as the Independent-Republicans of Minnesota from November 15, 1975, until September 23, 1995, and are counted as Republicans.)
▌2. Rudy Boschwitz (I-R)

==== Mississippi ====
▌1. John C. Stennis (D)
▌2. Thad Cochran (R)

==== Missouri ====
▌1. John Danforth (R)
▌3. Thomas Eagleton (D)

==== Montana ====
▌1. John Melcher (D)
▌2. Max Baucus (D)

==== Nebraska ====
▌1. Edward Zorinsky (D)
▌2. J. James Exon (D)

==== Nevada ====
▌1. Howard Cannon (D)
▌3. Paul Laxalt (R)

==== New Hampshire ====
▌2. Gordon J. Humphrey (R)
▌3. Warren Rudman (R)

==== New Jersey ====
▌1. Harrison A. Williams (D), until March 11, 1982

▌Nicholas F. Brady (R), from April 27, 1982, until December 27, 1982
▌Frank Lautenberg (D), from December 27, 1982

▌2. Bill Bradley (D)

==== New Mexico ====
▌1. Harrison Schmitt (R)
▌2. Pete Domenici (R)

==== New York ====
▌1. Daniel Patrick Moynihan (D)
▌3. Al D'Amato (R)

==== North Carolina ====
▌2. Jesse Helms (R)
▌3. John Porter East (R)

==== North Dakota ====
▌1. Quentin Burdick (D-NPL) (Note: The Minnesota Democratic–Farmer–Labor Party (DFL) and the North Dakota Democratic-Nonpartisan League Party (D-NPL) are the Minnesota and North Dakota affiliates of the U.S. Democratic Party and are counted as Democrats.)
▌3. Mark Andrews (R)

==== Ohio ====
▌1. Howard Metzenbaum (D)
▌3. John Glenn (D)

==== Oklahoma ====
▌2. David Boren (D)
▌3. Don Nickles (R)

==== Oregon ====
▌2. Mark Hatfield (R)
▌3. Bob Packwood (R)

==== Pennsylvania ====
▌1. John Heinz (R)
▌3. Arlen Specter (R)

==== Rhode Island ====
▌1. John Chafee (R)
▌2. Claiborne Pell (D)

==== South Carolina ====
▌2. Strom Thurmond (R)
▌3. Fritz Hollings (D)

==== South Dakota ====
▌2. Larry Pressler (R)
▌3. James Abdnor (R)

==== Tennessee ====
▌1. Jim Sasser (D)
▌2. Howard Baker (R)

==== Texas ====
▌1. Lloyd Bentsen (D)
▌2. John Tower (R)

==== Utah ====
▌1. Orrin Hatch (R)
▌3. Jake Garn (R)

==== Vermont ====
▌1. Robert Stafford (R)
▌3. Patrick Leahy (D)

==== Virginia ====
▌1. Harry F. Byrd Jr. (ID)
▌2. John Warner (R)

==== Washington ====
▌1. Henry M. Jackson (D)
▌3. Slade Gorton (R)

==== West Virginia ====
▌1. Robert Byrd (D)
▌2. Jennings Randolph (D)

==== Wisconsin ====
▌1. William Proxmire (D)
▌3. Bob Kasten (R)

==== Wyoming ====
▌1. Malcolm Wallop (R)
▌2. Alan Simpson (R)

Senators' party membership by state at the opening of the 97th Congress in January 1981 2 Democrats 1 Democrat and 1 Republican 2 Republicans 1 Independent and 1 Republican

Senate majority leadership

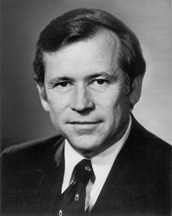
Republican leader
Howard Baker

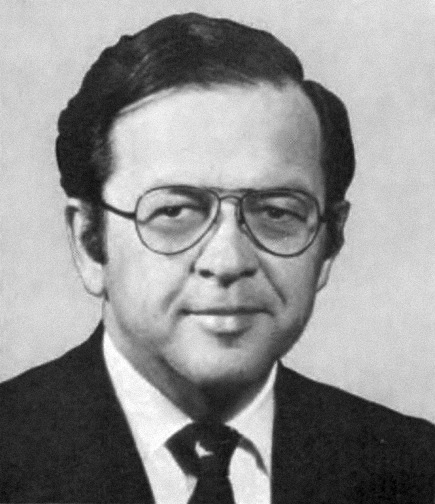
Republican whip
Ted Stevens

Senate minority leadership

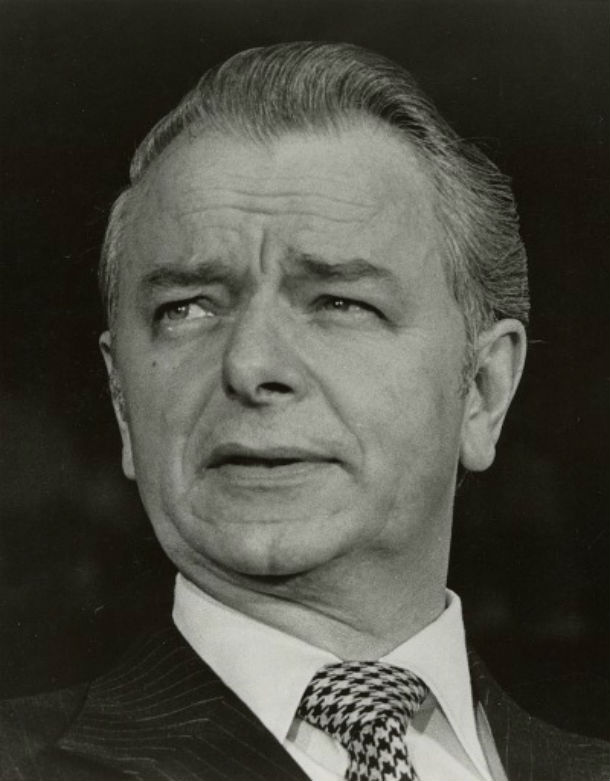
Democratic leader
Robert Byrd

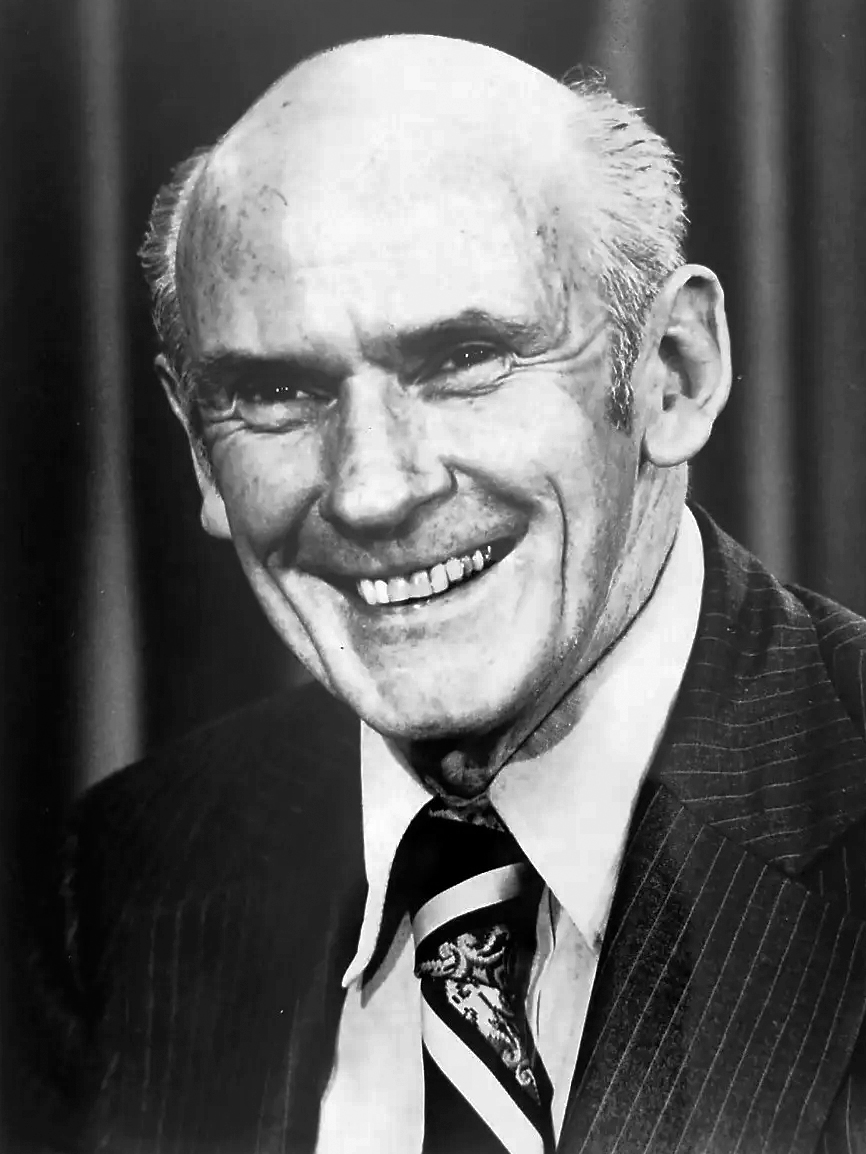
Democratic whip
Alan Cranston

=== House of Representatives ===
Representatives are listed by their district numbers.

==== Alabama ====
▌1. Jack Edwards (R)
▌2. William Louis Dickinson (R)
▌3. Bill Nichols (D)
▌4. Tom Bevill (D)
▌5. Ronnie Flippo (D)
▌6. Albert L. Smith Jr. (R)
▌7. Richard Shelby (D)

==== Alaska ====
▌At-large. Don Young (R)

==== Arizona ====
▌1. John Jacob Rhodes (R)
▌2. Mo Udall (D)
▌3. Bob Stump (D)
▌4. Eldon Rudd (R)

==== Arkansas ====
▌1. William Vollie Alexander Jr. (D)
▌2. Ed Bethune (R)
▌3. John Paul Hammerschmidt (R)
▌4. Beryl Anthony Jr. (D)

==== California ====
▌1. Eugene A. Chappie (R)
▌2. Donald H. Clausen (R)
▌3. Bob Matsui (D)
▌4. Vic Fazio (D)
▌5. John Burton (D)
▌6. Phillip Burton (D)
▌7. George Miller (D)
▌8. Ron Dellums (D)
▌9. Pete Stark (D)
▌10. Don Edwards (D)
▌11. Tom Lantos (D)
▌12. Pete McCloskey (R)
▌13. Norman Mineta (D)
▌14. Norman D. Shumway (R)
▌15. Tony Coelho (D)
▌16. Leon Panetta (D)
▌17. Chip Pashayan (R)
▌18. Bill Thomas (R)
▌19. Robert J. Lagomarsino (R)
▌20. Barry Goldwater Jr. (R)
▌21. Bobbi Fiedler (R)
▌22. Carlos Moorhead (R)
▌23. Anthony Beilenson (D)
▌24. Henry Waxman (D)
▌25. Edward R. Roybal (D)
▌26. John H. Rousselot (R)
▌27. Bob Dornan (R)
▌28. Julian Dixon (D)
▌29. Augustus Hawkins (D)
▌30. George E. Danielson (D), until March 9, 1982

▌Matthew G. Martínez (D), from July 13, 1982

▌31. Mervyn Dymally (D)
▌32. Glenn M. Anderson (D)
▌33. Wayne R. Grisham (R)
▌34. Dan Lungren (R)
▌35. David Dreier (R)
▌36. George Brown Jr. (D)
▌37. Jerry Lewis (R)
▌38. Jerry M. Patterson (D)
▌39. William E. Dannemeyer (R)
▌40. Robert Badham (R)
▌41. Bill Lowery (R)
▌42. Duncan L. Hunter (R)
▌43. Clair Burgener (R)

==== Colorado ====
▌1. Pat Schroeder (D)
▌2. Tim Wirth (D)
▌3. Ray Kogovsek (D)
▌4. Hank Brown (R)
▌5. Ken Kramer (R)

==== Connecticut ====
▌1. William R. Cotter (D), until September 8, 1981

▌Barbara B. Kennelly (D), from January 12, 1982

▌2. Sam Gejdenson (D)
▌3. Lawrence J. DeNardis (R)
▌4. Stewart McKinney (R)
▌5. William R. Ratchford (D)
▌6. Toby Moffett (D)

==== Delaware ====
▌At-large. Thomas B. Evans Jr. (R)

==== Florida ====
▌1. Earl Hutto (D)
▌2. Don Fuqua (D)
▌3. Charles E. Bennett (D)
▌4. Bill Chappell (D)
▌5. Bill McCollum (R)
▌6. Bill Young (R)
▌7. Sam Gibbons (D)
▌8. Andy Ireland (D)
▌9. Bill Nelson (D)
▌10. Skip Bafalis (R)
▌11. Dan Mica (D)
▌12. Clay Shaw (R)
▌13. William Lehman (D)
▌14. Claude Pepper (D)
▌15. Dante Fascell (D)

==== Georgia ====
▌1. Bo Ginn (D)
▌2. Charles Floyd Hatcher (D)
▌3. Jack Brinkley (D)
▌4. Elliott H. Levitas (D)
▌5. Wyche Fowler (D)
▌6. Newt Gingrich (R)
▌7. Larry McDonald (D)
▌8. Billy Lee Evans (D)
▌9. Ed Jenkins (D)
▌10. Doug Barnard Jr. (D)

==== Hawaii ====
▌1. Cecil Heftel (D)
▌2. Daniel Akaka (D)

==== Idaho ====
▌1. Larry Craig (R)
▌2. George V. Hansen (R)

==== Illinois ====
▌1. Harold Washington (D)
▌2. Gus Savage (D)
▌3. Marty Russo (D)
▌4. Ed Derwinski (R)
▌5. John G. Fary (D)
▌6. Henry Hyde (R)
▌7. Cardiss Collins (D)
▌8. Dan Rostenkowski (D)
▌9. Sidney R. Yates (D)
▌10. John Porter (R)
▌11. Frank Annunzio (D)
▌12. Phil Crane (R)
▌13. Robert McClory (R)
▌14. John N. Erlenborn (R)
▌15. Tom Corcoran (R)
▌16. Lynn Morley Martin (R)
▌17. George M. O'Brien (R)
▌18. Robert H. Michel (R)
▌19. Tom Railsback (R)
▌20. Paul Findley (R)
▌21. Edward Rell Madigan (R)
▌22. Dan Crane (R)
▌23. Melvin Price (D)
▌24. Paul Simon (D)

==== Indiana ====
▌1. Adam Benjamin Jr. (D), until September 7, 1982

▌Katie Hall (D), from November 2, 1982

▌2. Floyd Fithian (D)
▌3. John P. Hiler (R)
▌4. Dan Coats (R)
▌5. Elwood Hillis (R)
▌6. David W. Evans (D)
▌7. John T. Myers (R)
▌8. H. Joel Deckard (R)
▌9. Lee H. Hamilton (D)
▌10. Philip Sharp (D)
▌11. Andrew Jacobs Jr. (D)

==== Iowa ====
▌1. Jim Leach (R)
▌2. Tom Tauke (R)
▌3. T. Cooper Evans (R)
▌4. Neal Edward Smith (D)
▌5. Tom Harkin (D)
▌6. Berkley Bedell (D)

==== Kansas ====
▌1. Pat Roberts (R)
▌2. James Edmund Jeffries (R)
▌3. Larry Winn (R)
▌4. Dan Glickman (D)
▌5. Bob Whittaker (R)

==== Kentucky ====
▌1. Carroll Hubbard (D)
▌2. William Natcher (D)
▌3. Romano Mazzoli (D)
▌4. Gene Snyder (R)
▌5. Hal Rogers (R)
▌6. Larry J. Hopkins (R)
▌7. Carl D. Perkins (D)

==== Louisiana ====
▌1. Bob Livingston (R)
▌2. Lindy Boggs (D)
▌3. Billy Tauzin (D)
▌4. Buddy Roemer (D)
▌5. Jerry Huckaby (D)
▌6. Henson Moore (R)
▌7. John Breaux (D)
▌8. Gillis William Long (D)

==== Maine ====
▌1. David F. Emery (R)
▌2. Olympia Snowe (R)

==== Maryland ====
▌1. Roy Dyson (D)
▌2. Clarence Long (D)
▌3. Barbara Mikulski (D)
▌4. Marjorie Holt (R)
▌5. Gladys Spellman (D), until February 24, 1981

▌Steny Hoyer (D), from May 19, 1981

▌6. Beverly Byron (D)
▌7. Parren Mitchell (D)
▌8. Michael D. Barnes (D)

==== Massachusetts ====
▌1. Silvio O. Conte (R)
▌2. Edward Boland (D)
▌3. Joseph D. Early (D)
▌4. Barney Frank (D)
▌5. James Shannon (D)
▌6. Nicholas Mavroules (D)
▌7. Ed Markey (D)
▌8. Tip O'Neill (D)
▌9. Joe Moakley (D)
▌10. Margaret Heckler (R)
▌11. Brian J. Donnelly (D)
▌12. Gerry Studds (D)

==== Michigan ====
▌1. John Conyers (D)
▌2. Carl Pursell (R)
▌3. Howard Wolpe (D)
▌4. David Stockman (R), until January 27, 1981

▌Mark D. Siljander (R), from April 21, 1981

▌5. Harold S. Sawyer (R)
▌6. James Whitney Dunn (R)
▌7. Dale Kildee (D)
▌8. J. Bob Traxler (D)
▌9. Guy Vander Jagt (R)
▌10. Donald J. Albosta (D)
▌11. Robert William Davis (R)
▌12. David Bonior (D)
▌13. George Crockett Jr. (D)
▌14. Dennis Hertel (D)
▌15. William D. Ford (D)
▌16. John D. Dingell Jr. (D)
▌17. William M. Brodhead (D)
▌18. James Blanchard (D)
▌19. William Broomfield (R)

==== Minnesota ====
▌1. Arlen Erdahl (I-R)
▌2. Tom Hagedorn (I-R)
▌3. Bill Frenzel (I-R)
▌4. Bruce Vento (DFL)
▌5. Martin Olav Sabo (DFL)
▌6. Vin Weber (R)
▌7. Arlan Stangeland (R)
▌8. Jim Oberstar (DFL)

==== Mississippi ====
▌1. Jamie L. Whitten (D)
▌2. David R. Bowen (D)
▌3. Sonny Montgomery (D)
▌4. Jon Hinson (R), until April 13, 1981

▌ Wayne Dowdy (D), from July 7, 1981

▌5. Trent Lott (R)

==== Missouri ====
▌1. Bill Clay (D)
▌2. Robert A. Young (D)
▌3. Dick Gephardt (D)
▌4. Ike Skelton (D)
▌5. Richard Walker Bolling (D)
▌6. Tom Coleman (R)
▌7. Gene Taylor (R)
▌8. Wendell Bailey (R)
▌9. Harold Volkmer (D)
▌10. Bill Emerson (R)

==== Montana ====
▌1. Pat Williams (D)
▌2. Ron Marlenee (R)

==== Nebraska ====
▌1. Doug Bereuter (R)
▌2. Hal Daub (R)
▌3. Virginia D. Smith (R)

==== Nevada ====
▌At-large. James David Santini (D)

==== New Hampshire ====
▌1. Norman D'Amours (D)
▌2. Judd Gregg (R)

==== New Jersey ====
▌1. James Florio (D)
▌2. William J. Hughes (D)
▌3. James J. Howard (D)
▌4. Chris Smith (R)
▌5. Millicent Fenwick (R)
▌6. Edwin B. Forsythe (R)
▌7. Marge Roukema (R)
▌8. Robert A. Roe (D)
▌9. Harold C. Hollenbeck (R)
▌10. Peter W. Rodino (D)
▌11. Joseph Minish (D)
▌12. Matthew John Rinaldo (R)
▌13. Jim Courter (R)
▌14. Frank Joseph Guarini (D)
▌15. Bernard J. Dwyer (D)

==== New Mexico ====
▌1. Manuel Lujan Jr. (R)
▌2. Joe Skeen (R)

==== New York ====
▌1. William Carney (C) (Note: Caucused with the Republicans.)
▌2. Thomas Downey (D)
▌3. Gregory W. Carman (R)
▌4. Norman F. Lent (R)
▌5. Raymond J. McGrath (R)
▌6. John LeBoutillier (R)
▌7. Joseph P. Addabbo (D)
▌8. Benjamin Stanley Rosenthal (D)
▌9. Geraldine Ferraro (D)
▌10. Mario Biaggi (D)
▌11. James H. Scheuer (D)
▌12. Shirley Chisholm (D)
▌13. Stephen Solarz (D)
▌14. Fred Richmond (D), until August 25, 1982
▌15. Leo C. Zeferetti (D)
▌16. Chuck Schumer (D)
▌17. Guy Molinari (R)
▌18. Bill Green (R)
▌19. Charles Rangel (D)
▌20. Theodore S. Weiss (D)
▌21. Robert Garcia (D)
▌22. Jonathan Brewster Bingham (D)
▌23. Peter A. Peyser (D)
▌24. Richard Ottinger (D)
▌25. Hamilton Fish IV (R)
▌26. Benjamin Gilman (R)
▌27. Matthew F. McHugh (D)
▌28. Samuel S. Stratton (D)
▌29. Gerald Solomon (R)
▌30. David O'Brien Martin (R)
▌31. Donald J. Mitchell (R)
▌32. George C. Wortley (R)
▌33. Gary A. Lee (R)
▌34. Frank Horton (R)
▌35. Barber Conable (R)
▌36. John J. LaFalce (D)
▌37. Henry J. Nowak (D)
▌38. Jack Kemp (R)
▌39. Stan Lundine (D)

==== North Carolina ====
▌1. Walter B. Jones Sr. (D)
▌2. Lawrence H. Fountain (D)
▌3. Charles Orville Whitley (D)
▌4. Ike Franklin Andrews (D)
▌5. Stephen L. Neal (D)
▌6. Walter E. Johnston III (R)
▌7. Charlie Rose (D)
▌8. Bill Hefner (D)
▌9. James G. Martin (R)
▌10. Jim Broyhill (R)
▌11. Bill Hendon (R)

==== North Dakota ====
▌At-large. Byron Dorgan (D-NPL)

==== Ohio ====
▌1. Bill Gradison (R)
▌2. Tom Luken (D)
▌3. Tony P. Hall (D)
▌4. Tennyson Guyer (R), until April 12, 1981

▌Mike Oxley (R), from June 25, 1981

▌5. Del Latta (R)
▌6. Bob McEwen (R)
▌7. Bud Brown (R)
▌8. Tom Kindness (R)
▌9. Ed Weber (R)
▌10. Clarence E. Miller (R)
▌11. J. William Stanton (R)
▌12. Bob Shamansky (D)
▌13. Donald J. Pease (D)
▌14. John F. Seiberling (D)
▌15. Chalmers Wylie (R)
▌16. Ralph Regula (R)
▌17. John M. Ashbrook (R), until April 24, 1982

▌Jean Spencer Ashbrook (R), from June 29, 1982

▌18. Douglas Applegate (D)
▌19. Lyle Williams (R)
▌20. Mary Rose Oakar (D)
▌21. Louis Stokes (D)
▌22. Dennis E. Eckart (D)
▌23. Ronald M. Mottl (D)

==== Oklahoma ====
▌1. James R. Jones (D)
▌2. Mike Synar (D)
▌3. Wes Watkins (D)
▌4. Dave McCurdy (D)
▌5. Mickey Edwards (R)
▌6. Glenn English (D)

==== Oregon ====
▌1. Les AuCoin (D)
▌2. Denny Smith (R)
▌3. Ron Wyden (D)
▌4. Jim Weaver (D)

==== Pennsylvania ====
▌1. Thomas M. Foglietta (D)
▌2. William H. Gray III (D)
▌3. Raymond Lederer (D), until April 29, 1981

▌Joseph F. Smith (D), from July 21, 1981

▌4. Charles F. Dougherty (R)
▌5. Richard T. Schulze (R)
▌6. Gus Yatron (D)
▌7. Robert W. Edgar (D)
▌8. James K. Coyne III (R)
▌9. Bud Shuster (R)
▌10. Joseph M. McDade (R)
▌11. James Nelligan (R)
▌12. John Murtha (D)
▌13. Lawrence Coughlin (R)
▌14. William J. Coyne (D)
▌15. Donald L. Ritter (R)
▌16. Robert Smith Walker (R)
▌17. Allen E. Ertel (D)
▌18. Doug Walgren (D)
▌19. William F. Goodling (R)
▌20. Joseph M. Gaydos (D)
▌21. Donald A. Bailey (D)
▌22. Austin Murphy (D)
▌23. William F. Clinger Jr. (R)
▌24. Marc L. Marks (R)
▌▌25. Eugene Atkinson (D), changed to (R) October 14, 1981

==== Rhode Island ====
▌1. Fernand St Germain (D)
▌2. Claudine Schneider (R)

==== South Carolina ====
▌1. Thomas F. Hartnett (R)
▌2. Floyd Spence (R)
▌3. Butler Derrick (D)
▌4. Carroll A. Campbell Jr. (R)
▌5. Kenneth Lamar Holland (D)
▌6. John Light Napier (R)

==== South Dakota ====
▌1. Tom Daschle (D)
▌2. Clint Roberts (R)

==== Tennessee ====
▌1. Jimmy Quillen (R)
▌2. John Duncan Sr. (R)
▌3. Marilyn Lloyd (D)
▌4. Albert Gore Jr. (D)
▌5. Bill Boner (D)
▌6. Robin Beard (R)
▌7. Ed Jones (D)
▌8. Harold Ford Sr. (D)

==== Texas ====
▌1. Sam B. Hall Jr. (D)
▌2. Charlie Wilson (D)
▌3. James M. Collins (R)
▌4. Ralph Hall (D)
▌5. Jim Mattox (D)
▌6. Phil Gramm (D)
▌7. Bill Archer (R)
▌8. Jack Fields (R)
▌9. Jack Brooks (D)
▌10. J. J. Pickle (D)
▌11. Marvin Leath (D)
▌12. Jim Wright (D)
▌13. Jack Hightower (D)
▌14. William Neff Patman (D)
▌15. Kika de la Garza (D)
▌16. Richard Crawford White (D)
▌17. Charles Stenholm (D)
▌18. Mickey Leland (D)
▌19. Kent Hance (D)
▌20. Henry B. González (D)
▌21. Tom Loeffler (R)
▌22. Ron Paul (R)
▌23. Abraham Kazen (D)
▌24. Martin Frost (D)

==== Utah ====
▌1. Jim Hansen (R)
▌2. David Daniel Marriott (R)

==== Vermont ====
▌At-large. Jim Jeffords (R)

==== Virginia ====
▌1. Paul Trible (R)
▌2. G. William Whitehurst (R)
▌3. Thomas J. Bliley Jr. (R)
▌4. Robert Daniel (R)
▌5. Dan Daniel (D)
▌6. M. Caldwell Butler (R)
▌7. J. Kenneth Robinson (R)
▌8. Stanford Parris (R)
▌9. William C. Wampler (R)
▌10. Frank Wolf (R)

==== Washington ====
▌1. Joel Pritchard (R)
▌2. Al Swift (D)
▌3. Don Bonker (D)
▌4. Sid Morrison (R)
▌5. Tom Foley (D)
▌6. Norm Dicks (D)
▌7. Mike Lowry (D)

==== West Virginia ====
▌1. Bob Mollohan (D)
▌2. Cleve Benedict (R)
▌3. Mick Staton (R)
▌4. Nick Rahall (D)

==== Wisconsin ====
▌1. Les Aspin (D)
▌2. Robert Kastenmeier (D)
▌3. Steve Gunderson (R)
▌4. Clement J. Zablocki (D)
▌5. Henry S. Reuss (D)
▌6. Tom Petri (R)
▌7. Dave Obey (D)
▌8. Toby Roth (R)
▌9. Jim Sensenbrenner (R)

==== Wyoming ====
▌At-large. Dick Cheney (R)

==== Non-voting members ====
▌American Samoa. Fofó Iosefa Fiti Sunia (D)
▌District of Columbia. Walter Fauntroy (D)
▌Guam. Antonio Borja Won Pat (D)
▌Virgin Islands. Ron de Lugo (D)
▌Puerto Rico. Baltasar Corrada del Rio (PNP)

House majority leadership

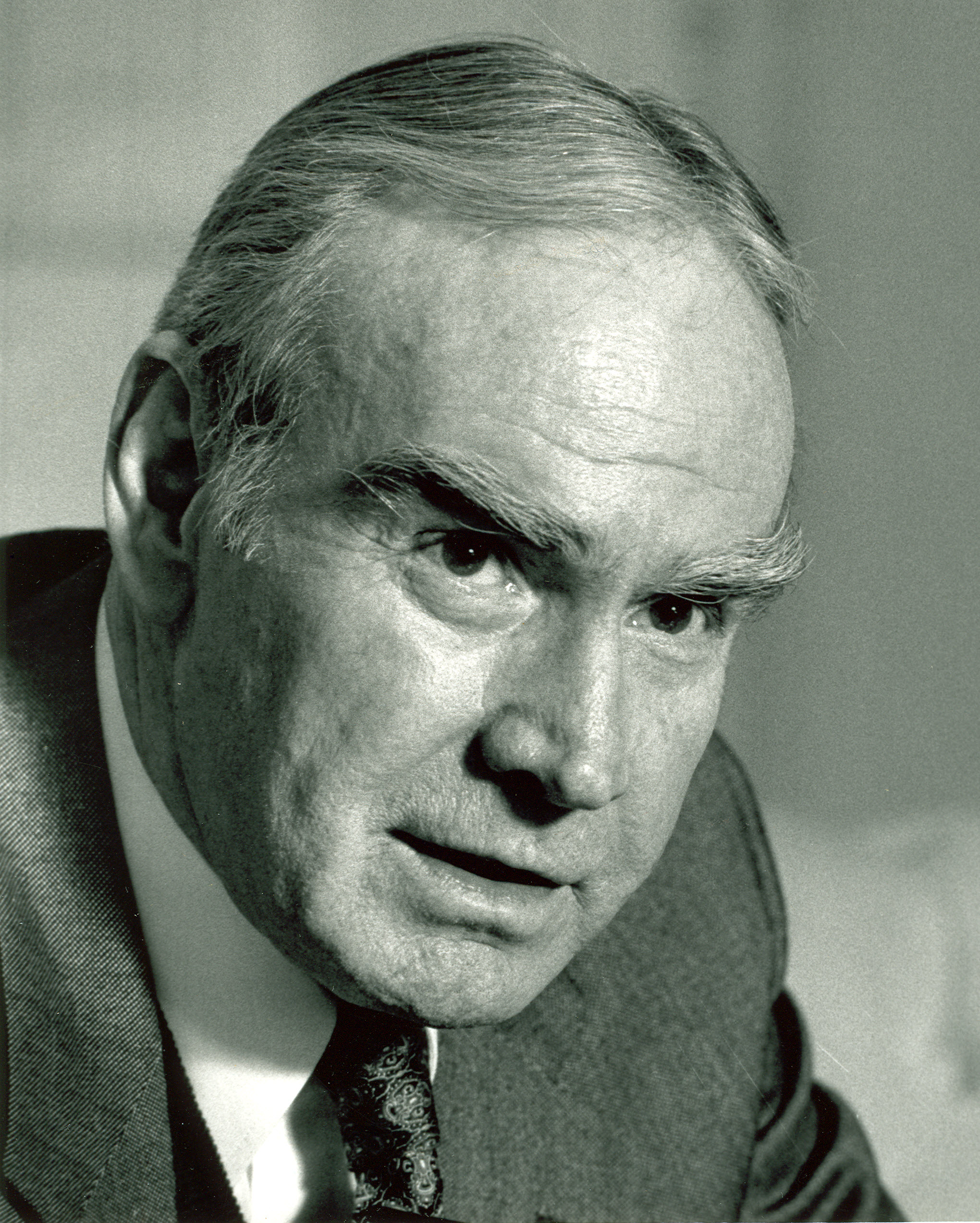
Democratic leader
Jim Wright

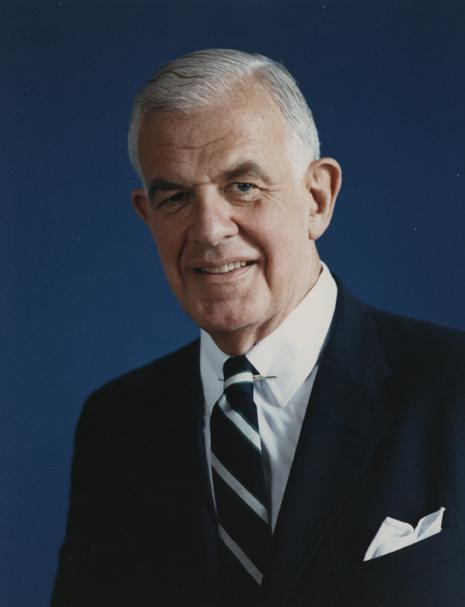
Democratic whip
Tom Foley

House minority leadership

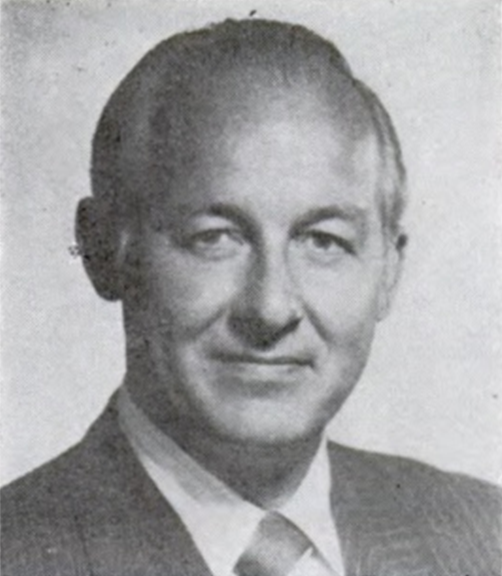
Republican leader
Bob Michel

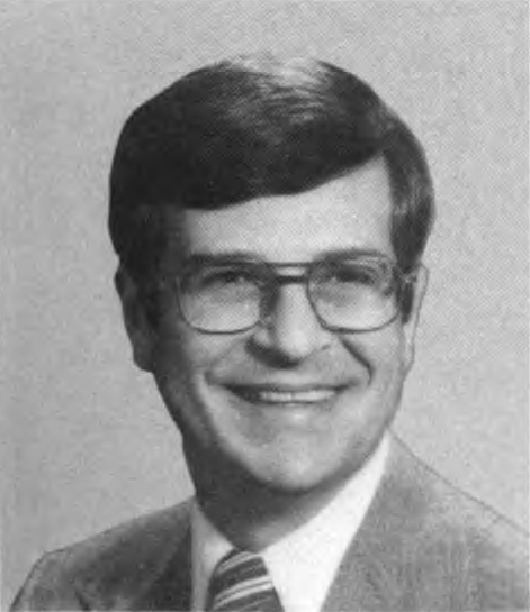
Republican whip
Trent Lott

== Changes in membership ==
=== Senate ===
There were 2 resignations.

Senate changes
State (class)	Vacated by	Reason for change	Successor	Date of successor's formal installation (Note: When seated or oath administered, not necessarily when service began.)
New Jersey (Class 1)	Harrison A. Williams (D)	Incumbent resigned March 11, 1982, before a planned expulsion vote, having been convicted of bribery in the Abscam sting operation. A successor was appointed April 12, 1982, to finish the term.	Nicholas F. Brady (R)	April 12, 1982
New Jersey (Class 1)	Nicholas F. Brady (R)	Incumbent resigned December 27, 1982, so his elected successor could be appointed for preferential seniority. A successor was appointed December 27, 1982, having already been elected to the next term.	Frank Lautenberg (D)	December 27, 1982

=== House of Representatives ===
There were 4 deaths, 4 resignations, one declared vacancy, and one party change.

House changes
District	Vacated by	Reason for change	Successor	Date of successor's formal installation
Michigan 4th	David Stockman (R)	Resigned January 27, 1981, after being appointed Director of the Office of Management and Budget	Mark D. Siljander (R)	April 21, 1981
Maryland 5th	Gladys Spellman (D)	Incapacitated since last Congress and seat declared vacant February 24, 1981	Steny Hoyer (D)	May 19, 1981
Ohio 4th	Tennyson Guyer (R)	Died April 12, 1981	Mike Oxley (R)	June 25, 1981
Mississippi 4th	Jon Hinson (R)	Resigned April 13, 1981	Wayne Dowdy (D)	July 7, 1981
Pennsylvania 3rd	Raymond Lederer (D)	Resigned April 29, 1981, before a planned expulsion vote, having been convicted of bribery in the Abscam sting operation	Joseph F. Smith (D)	July 21, 1981
Connecticut 1st	William R. Cotter (D)	Died September 8, 1981	Barbara B. Kennelly (D)	January 12, 1982
Pennsylvania 25th	Eugene Atkinson (D)	Changed parties October 14, 1981	Eugene Atkinson (R)	October 14, 1981
California 30th	George E. Danielson (D)	Resigned March 9, 1982, after being appointed associate justice of the California Courts of Appeal	Matthew G. Martínez (D)	July 13, 1982
Ohio 17th	John M. Ashbrook (R)	Died April 24, 1982	Jean Spencer Ashbrook (R)	June 29, 1982
New York 14th	Fred Richmond (D)	Resigned August 25, 1982	Vacant until end of Congress	
Indiana 1st	Adam Benjamin Jr. (D)	Died September 7, 1982	Katie Hall (D)	November 2, 1982

== Committees ==
Lists of committees and their party leaders for members of the House and Senate committees can be found through the Official Congressional Directory at the bottom of this article. The directory after the pages of terms of service lists committees of the Senate, House (Standing with Subcommittees, Select and Special) and Joint and, after that, House/Senate committee assignments. On the committees section of the House and Senate in the Official Congressional Directory, the committee's members on the first row on the left side shows the chairman of the committee and on the right side shows the ranking member of the committee.

=== Senate ===
- Aging (Special) (Chair: H. John Heinz III)
- Agriculture, Nutrition and Forestry (Chair: Jesse Helms; Ranking Member: Howell Heflin)
  - Soil and Water Conservation (Chair: Roger W. Jepsen; Ranking Member: Edward Zorinsky)
  - Agricultural Credit and Rural Electrification (Chair: Paula Hawkins; Ranking Member: Walter D. Huddleston)
  - Agricultural Production, Marketing and Stabilization of Prices (Chair: Thad Cochran; Ranking Member: David L. Boren)
  - Agricultural Research and General Legislation (Chair: Richard G. Lugar; Ranking Member: Alan J. Dixon)
  - Rural Development, Oversight and Investigations (Chair: Mark Andrews; Ranking Member: Edward Zorinsky)
  - Foreign Agricultural Policy (Chair: Rudy Boschwitz; Ranking Member: Alan J. Dixon)
  - Nutrition (Chair: Bob Dole; Ranking Member: Patrick J. Leahy)
  - Foreign, Water Resources and Environment (Chair: S.I. Hayakawa; Ranking Member: John Melcher)
- Appropriations (Chair: Mark Hatfield; Ranking Member: William Proxmire)
  - Agriculture and Related Agencies (Chair: Thad Cochran; Ranking Member: Thomas F. Eagleton)
  - Defense (Chair: Ted Stevens; Ranking Member: John C. Stennis)
  - District of Columbia (Chair: Al D'Amato; Ranking Member: Patrick J. Leahy)
  - Energy and Water Development (Chair: Mark Hatfield; Ranking Member: J. Bennett Johnston)
  - Foreign Operations (Chair: Bob Kasten; Ranking Member: Daniel K. Inouye)
  - HUD-Independent Agencies (Chair: Jake Garn; Ranking Member: Walter D. Huddleston)
  - Interior (Chair: James A. McClure; Ranking Member: Robert C. Byrd)
  - Labor-Health, Education and Welfare (Chair: Harrison Schmitt; Ranking Member: William Proxmire)
  - Legislative (Chair: Mack Mattingly; Ranking Member: Dale Bumpers)
  - Military Construction (Chair: Paul Laxalt; Ranking Member: Jim Sasser)
  - State, Justice, Commerce and Judiciary (Chair: Lowell P. Weicker; Ranking Member: Ernest F. Hollings)
  - Transportation (Chair: Mark Andrews; Ranking Member: Lawton Chiles)
  - Treasury, Postal Service and General Government (Chair: James Abdnor; Ranking Member: Dennis DeConcini)
- Armed Services (Chair: John Tower; Ranking Member: John C. Stennis)
  - Military Construction (Chair: Strom Thurmond; Ranking Member: Howard Cannon)
  - Tactical Warfare (Chair: Barry Goldwater; Ranking Member: Henry M. Jackson)
  - Strategic and Theater Nuclear Forces (Chair: John W. Warner; Ranking Member: Carl Levin)
  - Preparedness (Chair: Gordon J. Humphrey; Ranking Member: Carl Levin)
  - Sea Power and Force Projection (Chair: William S. Cohen; Ranking Member: Harry F. Byrd Jr.)
  - Manpower and Personnel (Chair: Roger W. Jepsen; Ranking Member: J. James Exon)
- Banking, Housing and Urban Affairs (Chair: Jake Garn; Ranking Member: Harrison A. Williams Jr.)
  - Housing and Urban Affairs (Chair: Richard G. Lugar; Ranking Member: Harrison A. Williams Jr.)
  - Financial Institutions (Chair: John Tower; Ranking Member: Alan Cranston)
  - International Finance and Monetary Policy (Chair: H. John Heinz III; Ranking Member: William Proxmire)
  - Economic Policy (Chair: William L. Armstrong; Ranking Member: Donald W. Riegle Jr.)
  - Securities (Chair: Al D'Amato; Ranking Member: Paul Sarbanes)
  - Rural Housing and Development (Chair: Harrison Schmitt; Ranking Member: Alan Dixon)
  - Consumer Affairs (Chair: John H. Chafee; Ranking Member: Chris Dodd)
- Budget (Chair: Pete Domenici; Ranking Member: Ernest F. Hollings)
- Commerce, Science and Transportation (Chair: Bob Packwood; Ranking Member: Howard Cannon)
  - Aviation (Chair: Nancy L. Kassebaum; Ranking Member: Howard Cannon)
  - Business, Trade and Tourism (Chair: Larry Pressler; Ranking Member: J. James Exon)
  - Communications (Chair: Barry Goldwater; Ranking Member: Ernest F. Hollings)
  - Consumer (Chair: Bob Kasten; Ranking Member: Wendell H. Ford)
  - Merchant Marine (Chair: Slade Gorton; Ranking Member: Daniel K. Inouye)
  - Science, Technology and Space (Chair: Harrison Schmitt; Ranking Member: Donald W. Riegle Jr.)
  - Surface Transportation (Chair: John C. Danforth; Ranking Member: Russell B. Long)
- Energy and Natural Resources (Chair: James A. McClure; Ranking Member: Henry M. Jackson)
  - Energy Conservation and Supply (Chair: Lowell P. Weicker; Ranking Member: Howard M. Metzenbaum)
  - Energy Regulation (Chair: Gordon J. Humphrey; Ranking Member: J. Bennett Johnston)
  - Energy Research and Development (Chair: Pete Domenici; Ranking Member: Wendell H. Ford)
  - Energy and Mineral Resources (Chair: John W. Warner; Ranking Member: Spark M. Matsunaga)
  - Water and Power (Chair: Frank H. Murkowski; Ranking Member: John Melcher)
  - Public Lands and Reserved Water (Chair: Malcolm Wallop; Ranking Member: Dale Bumpers)
- Environment and Public Works (Chair: Robert Stafford; Ranking Member: Jennings Randolph)
  - Environmental Pollution (Chair: John H. Chafee; Ranking Member: Jennings Randolph)
  - Nuclear Regulation (Chair: Alan K. Simpson; Ranking Member: George J. Mitchell)
  - Water Resources (Chair: James Abdnor; Ranking Member: Gary Hart)
  - Transportation (Chair: Steve Symms; Ranking Member: Lloyd Bentsen)
  - Toxic Substances and Environmental Oversight (Chair: Slade Gorton; Ranking Member: Max Baucus)
  - Regional and Community Development (Chair: Frank H. Murkowski; Ranking Member: Quentin N. Burdick)
- Ethics (Select) (Chair: Malcolm Wallop; Vice Chairman: Howell Heflin)
- Finance (Chair: Bob Dole; Ranking Member: Harry F. Byrd Jr.)
  - Taxation and Debt Management (Chair: Bob Packwood; Ranking Member: Lloyd Bentsen)
  - International Trade (Chair: John C. Danforth; Ranking Member: Spark Matsunaga)
  - Savings, Pensions and Investment Policy (Chair: John H. Chafee; Ranking Member: Spark Matsunaga)
  - Economic Growth, Employment and Revenue Sharing (Chair: H. John Heinz III; Ranking Member: George J. Mitchell)
  - Energy and Agricultural Taxation (Chair: Malcolm Wallop; Ranking Member: Bill Bradley)
  - Estate and Gift Taxation (Chair: Steve Symms; Ranking Member: David L. Boren)
  - Oversight of the Internal Revenue Service (Chair: Chuck Grassley; Ranking Member: Max Baucus)
- Foreign Relations (Chair: Charles H. Percy; Ranking Member: Claiborne Pell)
  - International Economic Policy (Chair: Jesse Helms; Ranking Member: Edward Zorinsky)
  - Arms Control, Oceans, International Operations and Environment (Chair: S.I. Hayakawa; Ranking Member: John Glenn)
  - Western Hemisphere Affairs (Chair: Jesse Helms; Ranking Member: Edward Zorinsky)
  - East Asian and Pacific Affairs (Chair: S.I. Hayakawa; Ranking Member: John Glenn)
  - European Affairs (Chair: Richard G. Lugar; Ranking Member: Joe Biden)
  - International Economic Policy (Chair: Charles Mathias; Ranking Member: Chris Dodd)
  - African Affairs (Chair: Nancy Kassebaum; Ranking Member: Paul Tsongas)
  - Near Eastern and South Asian Affairs (Chair: Rudy Boschwitz; Ranking Member: Paul Sarbanes)
  - Arms Control, Oceans, International Operations and Environment (Chair: Larry Pressler; Ranking Member: Alan Cranston)
- Governmental Affairs (Chair: Bill Roth; Ranking Member: Thomas F. Eagleton)
  - Permanent Subcommittee on Investigations (Chair: William V. Roth; Ranking Member: Sam Nunn)
  - Intergovernmental Relations (Chair: David Durenberger; Ranking Member: Jim Sasser)
  - Governmental Efficiency and the District of Columbia (Chair: Charles Mathias; Ranking Member: Thomas F. Eagleton)
  - Energy, Nuclear Proliferation and Federal Services (Chair: Charles H. Percy; Ranking Member: John Glenn)
  - Federal Expenditures, Research and Rules (Chair: John C. Danforth; Ranking Member: Lawton Chiles)
  - Civil Service, Post Office and General Services (Chair: Ted Stevens; Ranking Member: Jim Sasser)
  - Oversight of Government Management (Chair: William S. Cohen; Ranking Member: Carl Levin)
  - Congressional Operations and Oversight (Chair: Mack Mattingly; Ranking Member: David Pryor)
- Indian Affairs (Select) (Chair: William Cohen)
- Judiciary (Chair: Strom Thurmond; Ranking Member: Joe Biden)
  - Criminal Law (Chair: Charles Mathias; Ranking Member: Joe Biden)
  - Regulatory Reform (Chair: Paul Laxalt; Ranking Member: Patrick J. Leahy)
  - Constitution (Chair: Orrin Hatch; Ranking Member: Dennis DeConcini)
  - Courts (Chair: Bob Dole; Ranking Member: Howell Heflin)
  - Immigration and Refugee Policy (Chair: Alan K. Simpson; Ranking Member: Ted Kennedy)
  - Separation of Powers (Chair: John P. East; Ranking Member: Max Baucus)
  - Agency Administration (Chair: Chuck Grassley; Ranking Member: Howard M. Metzenbaum)
  - Security and Terrorism (Chair: Jeremiah Denton; Ranking Member: Max Baucus)
  - Juvenile Justice (Chair: Arlen Specter; Ranking Member: Howard M. Metzenbaum)
- Intelligence (Select) (Chair: Barry Goldwater; Vice Chairman: Daniel Moynihan)
- Labor and Human Resources (Chair: Orrin Hatch; Ranking Member: Ted Kennedy)
  - Labor (Chair: Don Nickles; Ranking Member: Harrison A. Williams)
  - Education, Arts and Humanities (Chair: Robert Stafford; Ranking Member: Claiborne Pell)
  - Employment and Productivity (Chair: Dan Quayle; Ranking Member: Howard M. Metzenbaum)
  - Handicapped (Chair: Lowell P. Weicker; Ranking Member: Jennings Randolph)
  - Alcoholism and Drug Abuse (Chair: Gordon J. Humphrey; Ranking Member: Donald W. Riegle Jr.)
  - Aging, Family and Human Services (Chair: Jeremiah Denton; Ranking Member: Thomas F. Eagleton)
  - Investigations and General Oversight (Chair: Paula Hawkins; Ranking Member: Ted Kennedy)
- Nutrition and Human Needs (Select) (Chair: [data missing]; Ranking Member: [data missing])
- Rules and Administration (Chair: Charles Mathias; Ranking Member: Wendell H. Ford)
- Small Business (Chair: Lowell P. Weicker Jr.; Ranking Member: Sam Nunn)
- Capital Formation and Retention (Chair: Bob Packwood; Ranking Member: Sam Nunn)
- Government Regulation and Paperwork (Chair: Orrin G. Hatch; Ranking Member: Dale Bumpers)
- Urban and Rural Economic Development (Chair: Al D'Amato; Ranking Member: Alan J. Dixon)
- Government Procurement (Chair: Don Nickles; Ranking Member: Jim Sasser)
- Productivity and Competition (Chair: Slade Gorton; Ranking Member: Max Baucus)
- Innovation and Technology (Chair: Warren Rudman; Ranking Member: Carl Levin)
- Export Promotion and Market Development (Chair: Rudy Boschwitz; Ranking Member: Walter D. Huddleston)
- Advocacy and Future of Small Business (Chair: S.I. Hayakawa; Ranking Member: Paul Tsongas)
- Veterans' Affairs (Chair: Alan K. Simpson; Ranking Member: Alan Cranston)
- Whole

=== House of Representatives ===
- Aging (Select) (Chair: Claude Pepper)
- Agriculture (Chair: Kika de la Garza; Ranking Member: William C. Wampler)
  - Cotton, Rice and Sugar (Chair: David R. Bowen; Ranking Member: Bill Thomas)
  - Livestock, Dairy and Poultry (Chair: Tom Harkin; Ranking Member: Tom Hagedorn)
  - Tobacco and Peanuts (Chair: Charlie Rose; Ranking Member: Larry J. Hopkins)
  - Wheat, Soybeans and Feed Grains (Chair: Tom Foley; Ranking Member: Paul Findley)
  - Conservation Credit and Rural Development (Chair: Ed Jones; Ranking Member: Jim Jeffords)
  - Department Operations Research and Foreign Agriculture (Chair: George E. Brown Jr.; Ranking Member: William C. Wampler)
  - Domestic Marketing, Consumer Relations and Nutrition (Chair: Frederick W. Richmond; Ranking Member: Ron Marlenee)
  - Forests, Family Farms and Energy (Chair: Jim Weaver; Ranking Member: Jim Weaver)
- Appropriations (Chair: Jamie L. Whitten; Ranking Member: Silvio O. Conte)
  - Agriculture, Rural Development and Related Agencies (Chair: Jamie L. Whitten; Ranking Member: Virginia Smith)
  - Defense (Chair: Joseph P. Addabbo; Ranking Member: Jack Edwards)
  - District of Columbia (Chair: Julian C. Dixon; Ranking Member: Lawrence Coughlin)
  - Energy and Power (Chair: Tom Bevill; Ranking Member: John T. Myers)
  - Foreign Operations (Chair: Clarence D. Long; Ranking Member: Jack F. Kemp)
  - HUD-Independent Agencies (Chair: Edward P. Boland; Ranking Member: Bill Green)
  - Interior (Chair: Sidney R. Yates; Ranking Member: Joseph M. McDade)
  - Labor-Health and Human Services (Chair: William Huston Natcher; Ranking Member: Silvio O. Conte)
  - Legislative (Chair: Vic Fazio; Ranking Member: Clair W. Burgener)
  - Military Construction (Chair: Bo Ginn; Ranking Member: Ralph Regula)
  - Commerce, Justice, State and the Judiciary (Chair: Neal Edward Smith; Ranking Member: George M. O'Brien)
  - Transportation (Chair: Adam Benjamin Jr.; Ranking Member: Lawrence Coughlin)
  - Treasury, Postal Service and General Government (Chair: Edward Roybal; Ranking Member: Clarence E. Miller)
- Armed Services (Chair: Charles Melvin Price; Ranking Member: William L. Dickinson)
  - Research and Development (Chair: Charles Melvin Price; Ranking Member: William L. Dickinson)
  - Seapower, Strategic and Critical Materials (Chair: Charles Edward Bennett; Ranking Member: Floyd Spence)
  - Procurement and Military Nuclear Systems (Chair: Samuel S. Stratton; Ranking Member: Marjorie S. Holt)
  - Investigations (Chair: Richard Crawford White; Ranking Member: Robin Beard)
  - Military Personnel and Compensation (Chair: Bill Nichols; Ranking Member: Donald J. Mitchell)
  - Military Installations and Facilities (Chair: Jack Brinkley; Ranking Member: Paul S. Trible)
  - Readiness (Chair: Dan Daniel; Ranking Member: G. William Whitehurst)
- Banking, Finance and Urban Affairs (Chair: Fernand St. Germain; Ranking Member: J. William Stanton)
  - Financial Institutions Supervision, Regulation and Insurance (Chair: Fernand St. Germain; Ranking Member: Chalmers P. Wylie)
  - Housing and Community Development (Chair: Henry B. Gonzalez; Ranking Member: J. William Stanton)
  - General Oversight and Renegotiation (Chair: Joseph G. Minish; Ranking Member: Ron Paul)
  - Consumer Affairs and Coinage (Chair: Frank Annunzio; Ranking Member: Thomas B. Evans Jr.)
  - International Development Institutions and Finance (Chair: Jerry M. Patterson; Ranking Member: Henry J. Hyde)
  - Domestic Monetary Policy (Chair: Walter E. Fauntroy; Ranking Member: George V. Hansen)
  - International Trade, Investment and Monetary Policy (Chair: Stephen L. Neal; Ranking Member: Jim Leach)
  - Economic Stabilization (Chair: James J. Blanchard; Ranking Member: Stewart B. McKinney)
- Budget (Chair: James R. Jones; Ranking Member: Del Latta)
- District of Columbia (Chair: Ron Dellums; Ranking Member: Stewart B. McKinney)
  - Fiscal Affairs and Health (Chair: Ron Dellums; Ranking Member: Stewart B. McKinney)
  - Government Operations and Metropolitan Affairs (Chair: William H. Gray III; Ranking Member: Stanford Parris)
  - Judiciary and Education (Chair: Mervyn M. Dymally; Ranking Member: Thomas J. Bliley Jr.)
- Education and Labor (Chair: Carl D. Perkins; Ranking Member: John M. Ashbrook)
  - Elementary, Secondary and Vocational Education (Chair: Carl D. Perkins; Ranking Member: William F. Goodling)
  - Employment Opportunities (Chair: Augustus F. Hawkins; Ranking Member: Jim Jeffords)
  - Labor-Management Relations (Chair: Phillip Burton; Ranking Member: John M. Ashbrook)
  - Health and Safety (Chair: Joseph M. Gaydos; Ranking Member: Ken Kramer)
  - Human Resources (Chair: Ike Andrews; Ranking Member: Tom Petri)
  - Postsecondary Education (Chair: Paul Simon; Ranking Member: E. Thomas Coleman)
  - Labor Standards (Chair: George Miller; Ranking Member: E. Thomas Coleman)
  - Select Education (Chair: Austin J. Murphy; Ranking Member: Arlen Erdahl)
- Energy and Commerce (Chair: John Dingell; Ranking Member: Jim Broyhill)
  - Oversight and Investigations (Chair: John D. Dingell; Ranking Member: Marc L. Marks)
  - Energy Conservation and Power (Chair: Richard L. Ottinger; Ranking Member: Carlos J. Moorhead)
  - Health and the Environment (Chair: Henry Waxman; Ranking Member: Edward R. Madigan)
  - Telecommunications, Consumer Protection and Finance (Chair: Timothy E. Wirth; Ranking Member: James M. Collins)
  - Fossil and Synthetic Fuels (Chair: Philip R. Sharp; Ranking Member: Clarence J. Brown)
  - Commerce, Transportation and Tourism (Chair: James J. Florio; Ranking Member: Norman F. Lent)
- Foreign Affairs (Chair: Clement J. Zablocki; Ranking Member: William S. Broomfield)
  - International Security and Scientific Affairs (Chair: Clement J. Zablocki; Ranking Member: William S. Broomfield)
  - International Operations (Chair: Dante B. Fascell; Ranking Member: Edward J. Derwinski)
  - Europe and the Middle East (Chair: Lee H. Hamilton; Ranking Member: Paul Findley)
  - Asian and Pacific Affairs (Chair: Stephen J. Solarz; Ranking Member: N/A)
  - International Economic Policy and Trade (Chair: Jonathan B. Bingham; Ranking Member: Robert J. Lagomarsino)
  - Human Rights and International Organizations (Chair: Stephen J. Solarz; Ranking Member: Jim Leach)
  - Africa (Chair: Howard Wolpe; Ranking Member: William F. Goodling)
  - Inter-American Affairs (Chair: Michael D. Barnes; Ranking Member: Benjamin A. Gilman)
- Government Operations (Chair: Jack Brooks; Ranking Member: Frank Horton)
  - Legislation and National Security (Chair: Jack Brooks; Ranking Member: Frank Horton)
  - Ingovernmental Relations and Human Resources (Chair: Lawrence H. Fountain; Ranking Member: Clarence J. Brown)
  - Commerce, Consumer and Monetary Affairs (Chair: Benjamin S. Rosenthal; Ranking Member: Lyle Williams)
  - Manpower and Housing (Chair: Cardiss Collins; Ranking Member: Paul N. McCloskey Jr.)
  - Government Activities and Transportation (Chair: John L. Burton; Ranking Member: Robert S. Walker)
  - Government Information and Individual Rights (Chair: Glenn English; Ranking Member: Thomas N. Kindness)
  - Environment, Energy and Natural Resources (Chair: Toby Moffett; Ranking Member: H. Joel Deckard)
- House Administration (Chair: Augustus F. Hawkins; Ranking Member: Bill Frenzel)
  - Accounts (Chair: Frank Annunzio; Ranking Member: Robert E. Badham)
  - Contracts and Printing (Chair: Joseph M. Gaydos; Ranking Member: Newt Gingrich)
  - Services (Chair: Ed Jones; Ranking Member: William L. Dickinson)
  - Office Systems (Chair: Bob Mollohan; Ranking Member: Bill Thomas)
  - Personnel and Police (Chair: Joseph G. Minish; Ranking Member: Gary Lee)
  - Policy Group on Information and Computers (Chair: Charlie Rose; Ranking Member: James K. Coyne)
- Insular Affairs (Chair: Mo Udall; Ranking Member: Manuel Lujan Jr.)
  - Energy and the Environment (Chair: Mo Udall; Ranking Member: Manuel Lujan Jr.)
  - Water and Power Resources (Chair: Abraham Kazen Jr.; Ranking Member: Don H. Clausen)
  - Public Lands and National Lands (Chair: John Seiberling; Ranking Member: Don Young)
  - Insular Affairs (Chair: Antonio B. Won Pat; Ranking Member: Robert J. Lagomarsino)
  - Mines and Mining (Chair: Jim Santini; Ranking Member: Dan Marriott)
  - Oversight and Investigations (Chair: Edward J. Markey; Ranking Member: Ron Marlenee)
- Judiciary (Chair: Peter W. Rodino; Ranking Member: Robert McClory)
  - Immigration, Refugees and International Law (Chair: Romano L. Mazzoli; Ranking Member: Hamilton Fish IV)
  - Administrative Law and Governmental Relations (Chair: George E. Danielson; Ranking Member: Carlos J. Moorhead)
  - Courts, Civil Liberties and the Administration of Justice (Chair: Robert W. Kastenmeier; Ranking Member: Thomas Railsback)
  - Civil and Constitutional Rights (Chair: Don Edwards; Ranking Member: Henry J. Hyde)
  - Monopolies and Commercial Law (Chair: Peter W. Rodino; Ranking Member: Robert McClory)
  - Crime (Chair: William J. Hughes; Ranking Member: John M. Ashbrook)
  - Criminal Justice (Chair: John Conyers; Ranking Member: James Sensenbrenner)
- Merchant Marine and Fisheries (Chair: Walter B. Jones Sr.; Ranking Member: Gene Snyder)
  - Merchant Marine (Chair: Mario Biaggi; Ranking Member: Paul N. McCloskey Jr.)
  - Fisheries, Wildlife Conservation and the Environment (Chair: John B. Breaux; Ranking Member: Edwin B. Forsythe)
  - Coast Guard and Navigation (Chair: Gerry E. Studds; Ranking Member: Don Young)
  - Oceanography (Chair: Norman D'Amours; Ranking Member: Joel Pritchard)
  - Panama Canal and Outer Continental Stuff (Chair: Carroll Hubbard Jr.; Ranking Member: Norman F. Lent)
- Narcotics Abuse and Control (Select) (Chair: Leo C. Zeferetti)
- Post Office and Civil Service (Chair: William D. Ford; Ranking Member: Edward J. Derwinski)
  - Investigations (Chair: William D. Ford; Ranking Member: Edward J. Derwinski)
  - Postal Operations and Services (Chair: Bill Clay; Ranking Member: Gene Taylor)
  - Civil Service (Chair: Patricia Schroeder; Ranking Member: Chip Pashayan)
  - Compensation and Employee Benefits (Chair: Mary Rose Oakar; Ranking Member: William E. Dannemeyer)
  - Census and Population (Chair: Robert Garcia; Ranking Member: Jim Courter)
  - Postal Personnel and Modernization (Chair: Mickey Leland; Ranking Member: Benjamin A. Gilman)
  - Human Resources (Chair: Geraldine A. Ferraro; Ranking Member: Tom Corcoran)
- Public Works and Transportation (Chair: James J. Howard; Ranking Member: Don H. Clausen)
  - Aviation (Chair: Norman Y. Mineta; Ranking Member: Gene Snyder)
  - Economic Development (Chair: Jim Oberstar; Ranking Member: Tom Hagedorn)
  - Investigations and Oversight (Chair: Elliott H. Levitas; Ranking Member: Barry M. Goldwater)
  - Public Buildings and Grounds (Chair: John G. Fary; Ranking Member: Arlan Stangeland)
  - Surface Transportation (Chair: Glenn M. Anderson; Ranking Member: Bud Shuster)
  - Water Resources (Chair: Robert A. Roe; Ranking Member: John Paul Hammerschmidt)
- Rules (Chair: Richard Walker Bolling; Ranking Member: Jimmy Quillen)
  - The Legislative Process (Chair: Gillis W. Long; Ranking Member: Trent Lott)
  - Rules of the House (Chair: Joe Moakley; Ranking Member: Gene Taylor)
- Science and Technology (Chair: Don Fuqua; Ranking Member: Larry Winn Jr.)
  - Energy Development and Applications (Chair: Don Fuqua; Ranking Member: Hamilton Fish IV)
  - Natural Resources, Agriculture Research and Environment (Chair: James H. Scheuer; Ranking Member: William Carney)
  - Energy Research and Production (Chair: Marilyn Lloyd; Ranking Member: Manuel Lujan Jr.)
  - Science, Research and Technology (Chair: Doug Walgren; Ranking Member: Margaret M. Heckler)
  - Space Science and Applications (Chair: Ronnie G. Flippo; Ranking Member: Harold C. Hollenbeck)
  - Transportation, Aviation and Materials (Chair: Dan Glickman; Ranking Member: Barry M. Goldwater)
  - Investigations and Oversight (Chair: Al Gore; Ranking Member: Robert S. Walker)
- Small Business (Chair: Parren Mitchell; Ranking Member: Joseph M. McDade)
  - SBA and SBIC Authority, Minority Enterprise and General Small Business Problems (Chair: Parren J. Mitchell; Ranking Member: Joseph M. McDade)
  - General Oversight (Chair: John J. LaFalce; Ranking Member: J. William Stanton)
  - Antitrust and Restraint of Trade Activities affecting Small Business (Chair: Tom Luken; Ranking Member: Lyle Williams)
  - Energy, Environment and Safety Issues affecting Small Business (Chair: Berkley Bedell; Ranking Member: Silvio O. Conte)
  - Tax, Access to Equity Capital and Business Opportunities (Chair: Henry Nowak; Ranking Member: Dan Marriott)
  - Export Opportunities and Special Small Business Problems (Chair: Andy Ireland; Ranking Member: William S. Broomfield)
- Standards of Official Conduct (Chair: Louis Stokes; Ranking Member: Floyd D. Spence)
- Veterans' Affairs (Chair: Gillespie V. Montgomery; Ranking Member: John Paul Hammerschmidt)
  - Oversight and Investigations (Chair: Gillespie V. Montgomery; Ranking Member: Elwood Hillis)
  - Hospitals and Health Care (Chair: Ronald M. Mottl; Ranking Member: John Paul Hammerschmidt)
  - Education, Training and Employment (Chair: Bob Edgar; Ranking Member: Margaret M. Heckler)
  - Compensation, Pension and Insurance (Chair: Sam B. Hall; Ranking Member: Chalmers P. Wylie)
  - Housing and Memorial Affairs (Chair: Marvin Leath; Ranking Member: N/A)
- Ways and Means (Chair: Dan Rostenkowski; Ranking Member: Barber B. Conable)
  - Trade (Chair: Sam Gibbons; Ranking Member: Guy Vander Jagt)
  - Social Security (Chair: J.J. Pickle; Ranking Member: Bill Archer)
  - Oversight (Chair: Charles Rangel; Ranking Member: Phil Crane)
  - Select Revenue Measures (Chair: William Cotter; Ranking Member: John Duncan Sr.)
  - Public Assistance and Unemployment Compensation (Chair: Pete Stark; Ranking Member: Skip Bafalis)
  - Health (Chair: Andrew Jacobs Jr.; Ranking Member: Bill Gradison)
- Whole

=== Joint committees ===
- Economic (Chair: Rep. Henry S. Reuss; Vice Chair: Sen. Roger W. Jepsen)
- Taxation (Chair: Rep. Dan Rostenkowski; Vice Chair: Sen. Bob Dole)
- The Library (Chair: Rep. Augustus F. Hawkins; Vice Chair: Sen. Charles Mathias)
- Printing (Chair: Sen. Charles Mathias; Vice Chair: Rep. Augustus F. Hawkins)

== Employees ==
=== Legislative branch agency directors ===
- Architect of the Capitol: George Malcolm White
- Attending Physician of the United States Congress: Freeman H. Cary
- Comptroller General of the United States: Elmer B. Staats, until March 3, 1981
  - Charles A. Bowsher, starting date unknown in 1981
- Director of the Congressional Budget Office: Alice M. Rivlin
- Librarian of Congress: Daniel J. Boorstin
- Public Printer of the United States: Danford L. Sawyer Jr.

=== Senate ===
- Chaplain: Edward L.R. Elson (Presbyterian), until February 9, 1981
  - Richard C. Halverson (Presbyterian), from February 9, 1981
- Curator: James R. Ketchum
- Historian: Richard A. Baker
- Parliamentarian: Robert Dove
- Secretary: William Hildenbrand
- Librarian: Roger K. Haley
- Sergeant at Arms: Howard S. Liebengood
- Secretary for the Majority: Howard O. Greene Jr.
- Secretary for the Minority: Walter J. Stewart, until September 1, 1981
  - Terrence E. Sauvain, from September 1, 1981

=== House of Representatives ===
- Chaplain: James D. Ford (Lutheran)
- Clerk: Edmund L. Henshaw Jr.
- Doorkeeper: James T. Molloy
- Parliamentarian: William Holmes Brown
- Postmaster: Robert V. Rota
- Reading Clerks:
  - Charles W. Hackney, Jr. (D) (until December 9, 1982), Meg Goetz (D) (starting December 9, 1982)
  - Bob Berry (R)
- Sergeant at Arms: Benjamin J. Guthrie

== See also ==
- List of new members of the 97th United States Congress
- 1980 United States elections (elections leading to this Congress)
  - 1980 United States presidential election
  - 1980 United States Senate elections
  - 1980 United States House of Representatives elections
- 1982 United States elections (elections during this Congress, leading to the next Congress)
  - 1982 United States Senate elections
  - 1982 United States House of Representatives elections
