= Earline S. Rogers =

American politician (1934–2024)

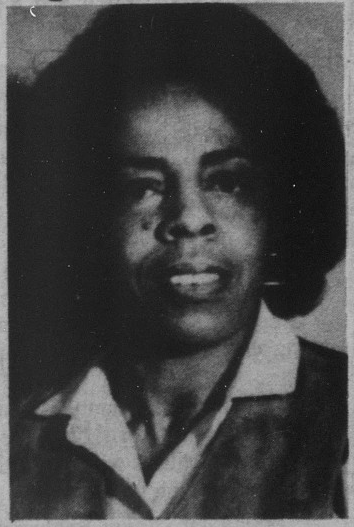
- Rogers in the Greencastle Banner Graphic in 1988

Member of the Indiana Senate from the 3rd district
- In office February 1, 1990 – November 9, 2016
- Preceded by: Carolyn Brown Mosby
- Succeeded by: Eddie Melton

Member of the Indiana House of Representatives from the 14th district
- In office December 11, 1982 – February 1, 1990
- Preceded by: Carolyn Brown Mosby
- Succeeded by: Vernon Smith

Personal details
- Born: December 20, 1934 Gary, Indiana, U.S.
- Died: September 5, 2024 (aged 89)
- Party: Democratic
- Spouse: Louis
- Education: Indiana University
- Profession: Educator

Earline S. Rogers (December 20, 1934 – September 5, 2024) was an American politician who was a Democratic member of the Indiana Senate, representing the 3rd District from 1990 through 2016. She earlier served in the Indiana House of Representatives from 1982 through 1990. Rogers was a member of the Indiana Black Legislative Caucus. Rogers died on September 5, 2024, at the age of 89.
