= Carolyn Brown Mosby =

American politician (1932–1990)

Carolyn Brown Mosby (May 10, 1932 – January 19, 1990) (D- Gary, Indiana) was elected to the Indiana State Senate in 1982, filling a vacancy left by Katie Hall (D-Gary) who gave up her senate seat to fill a vacancy in the United States Congress when Congressman Adam Benjamin (D-Gary) died. Previously, Mosby had served in the Indiana House of Representatives since 1978, also representing Gary.

== Biography ==
Mosby was born in Nashville, Tennessee to Alvin Thomas Brown (1912 – 2007) and Mary Snelling Brown (1912 – 1989), and moved to Gary in 1943. A marriage to the late William E. Jordan Jr., produced one son, William E. Jordan, III (1952 - ). In 1966 she married the late John Oliver Mosby, Sr. To this union one daughter, Carolyn Elizabeth Mosby (1967 - ) was born.

Mosby was a 1949 graduate of Roosevelt High School in Gary, and then attended the University of Illinois Urbana-Champaign and Indiana University Northwest in Gary. In 1951, she became the first black clerical employee at the Northern Indiana Public Service Company. She was also employed by the University of Chicago in the Economics department where she became friends with Nobel prize winning economist Milton Friedman, author Saul Bellow and historian John Hope Franklin (1915 - 2009), author of From Slavery to Freedom. She died in Gary on January 19, 1990.

== Politics ==
Mosby was elected to the Indiana General Assembly in 1978, and re-elected in 1980, and then to the Indiana State Senate in 1982. She was re-elected in 1984, and again in 1988. In the state Senate, she was the author of Indiana's first Minority Business legislation (Indiana Public Law 32 – 1982) which created the Governor's Commission on Minority Business Development. She was also the original author for the state's casino gaming legislation, with Gary being the site of the first riverboat casino.

She was the first Black to serve on the Indiana Legislative Council and also served on the National Conference of Insurance Legislators Executive Committee, National Conference of State Legislators, National Legislative Conference on Arson and National Black Caucus of State Legislators. She also a member of the State Tourism Promotion Grant Fund Committee, Governor's Commission on Minority Business Development, Sunset Evaluation Committee, the Interim Study Committee on the Uniform Marital Property Act and the Democratic National Committee Platform Accountability Commission. She was named Gary INFO News' Outstanding Citizen; recipient of the Gary Branch NAACP Ovington Award. Received the Presidential Award from the National Black Caucus of State Legislators and the prestigious and coveted Sagamore of the Wabash Award presented to her by former Indiana Governor Evan Bayh (D). She was also the recipient of a Residence Fellowship at the Harvard University John F. Kennedy School of Politics.

Mosby was honored posthumously by Indiana Black Expo renaming their humanitarian award the Senator Carolyn Brown Mosby Above & Beyond Award. The award is presented each year during the organization’s Corporate Luncheon. It has been given to actor Louis Gossett Jr., former NBA player Alan Henderson and gospel recording artist Kirk Franklin, just to name a few. A senior citizens high rise in Gary, Indiana also bears her name, along with Indiana State Road 53 – “Broadway”, that runs from the entrance to the U.S. Steel plant in Gary to Crown Point, Indiana. NIPSCO also funds a scholarship in her memory for high school students presented by the Urban League of Northwest Indiana each year.
