= Katie Hall (American politician) =

American politician (1938–2012)

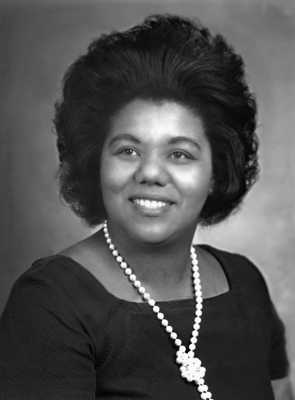

Member of the U.S. House of Representatives from Indiana's 1st district
- In office November 2, 1982 – January 3, 1985
- Preceded by: Adam Benjamin Jr.
- Succeeded by: Pete Visclosky

Member of the Indiana Senate from the 3rd district
- In office November 3, 1976 – November 10, 1982
- Preceded by: Rudy Clay
- Succeeded by: Carolyn Brown Mosby

Member of the Indiana House of Representatives from the 5th district
- In office November 6, 1974 – November 3, 1976
- Preceded by: Robert L. Freeland, Jr.
- Succeeded by: Rayfield Fisher

Personal details
- Born: Katie Beatrice Green; April 3, 1938 Mound Bayou, Mississippi, U.S.
- Died: February 20, 2012 (aged 73) Gary, Indiana, U.S.
- Party: Democratic
- Spouse: John Henry Hall
- Education: Mississippi Valley State University (BS); Indiana University, Bloomington (MS)
- Occupation: Educator

Katie Beatrice Hall (April 3, 1938 – February 20, 2012) was an American educator in Gary, Indiana, and a politician who served as a U.S. Representative from Indiana from 1982 to 1985. When Hall was sworn into federal office on November 2, 1982, she became the first black woman from Indiana to serve in the U.S. House of Representatives. Hall represented Indiana's 1st Congressional District in the final months of the 97th Congress and an entire two-year term in the 98th Congress from 1983 to 1985. She is best known for sponsoring legislation and leading efforts on the floor of the U.S. House in 1983 to make Martin Luther King Jr.'s birthday a national holiday after previous efforts had failed. H.R. 3706 to establish the third Monday in January as a federal holiday in King's honor was introduced in July 1983 and passed in the House on August 2, 1983. President Ronald Reagan signed the bill into law on November 2, 1983.

Prior to her election to the U.S. House, Hall served in the Indiana House of Representatives from 1974 to 1976, and as a member of the Indiana Senate from 1976 to 1982. She was also a delegate to the Democratic Mini Convention in Memphis, Tennessee, in 1978; chairperson of the Lake County, Indiana, Democratic Committee from 1978 to 1980; and chairperson of the Indiana State Democratic convention in 1980. Hall was defeated in her bid for reelection to the U.S. Congress in the Democratic primary in May 1984, narrowly losing to Peter Visclosky by 2,367 votes. She also lost two subsequent efforts against Visclosky in 1986 and 1990 to recapture Indiana's 1st District seat in the U.S. House. After serving in Congress, Hall was vice chairperson of the Gary Housing Board of Commissioners. In 1985, she became the city clerk of Gary; however, she resigned the position in January 2003 after signing a plea agreement related to mail fraud. Hall was subsequently sentenced to house arrest and probation. She retired from teaching in the Gary public schools in 2004.

== Early life and education ==
Katie Beatrice Green was born on April 3, 1938, to Jeff and Bessie Mae (Hooper) Green at Mound Bayou in Bolivar County, Mississippi. She attended the public schools of Mound Bayou and earned a Bachelor of Science (B.S.) degree from Mississippi Valley State University, Itta Bena, Mississippi, in 1960 and a Master of Science (M.S.) degree in education from Indiana University in Bloomington, Indiana, in 1968.

== Personal life ==
Katie Green married John Henry Hall on August 15, 1957. They were the parents of three daughters: Jacqueline Hall, Junifer Hall, and Michelle Hall.

== Career ==
=== Early years ===
After completing her education, Katie and her husband, John, moved to Gary, Indiana, where she became a social studies teacher in the city's public schools. Her involvement in local politics began in 1962 when she worked on Richard Hatcher's successful campaign to become mayor of Gary. Hall's campaign for city councilwoman in 1972 ended in defeat, but two years later she sought a seat in the Indiana General Assembly and won.

=== State legislator and Democratic leader ===
Hall served as a member of the Indiana House of Representatives from 1974 to 1976 and as a member of the Indiana Senate from 1976 to 1982. During this period she was also a delegate to the Democratic Mini Convention in Memphis, Tennessee, in 1978; Lake County, Indiana, Democratic Committee from 1978 to 1980; and chaired the Indiana State Democratic convention in 1980.

=== 1982 congressional campaign ===
Following the sudden death of U.S. Congressman Adam Benjamin, Jr. in September 1982, Gary mayor Richard Hatcher, who was also serving as the head of the 1st District's Democratic committee, selected Hall as the Democratic candidate in a special election to fill the vacancy for the remainder of Benjamin's term in the 97th Congress, as well as Benjamin's replacement on the ballot in the November election for a full two-year term in the 98th Congress.

Hall's selection as the Democratic nominee over more experienced candidates virtually assured her of a win in this heavily Democratic northwest Indiana district. She was simultaneously elected to Indiana's 1st District seat in the 97th and 98th Congresses, defeating Thomas Krieger, the Republican nominee in both races, with 63 percent of the vote in her bid for the remainder of Benjamin's term and 58 percent of the vote for the full two-year term.

=== U.S. congresswoman ===
Hall was sworn into office on November 2, 1982, becoming the first African American from Indiana elected to the U.S. House of Representatives. She served in the final months of the 97th Congress and an entire two-year term in the 98th Congress (1983–85). Hall was a member of the House Committee of Post Office and Civil Service and chaired its Subcommittee on Census and Population. She also served on the House Committee on Public Works and Transportation.

As a freshman congresswoman in 1983, Hall sponsored legislation and led the Capitol Hill drive to make Martin Luther King Jr.'s birthday a national holiday. Previous efforts to secure a national holiday in King's honor had been delayed in the U.S. House for more than fourteen years. (Legislators who opposed the previous bills largely argued against passage due to the cost of holiday and overtime pay for government employees, as well as the fixed date of January 15.) Hall sponsored H.R. 3706, which set the King holiday on the third Monday in January, and led efforts on the House floor to secure its passage. Introduced in July 1983, it passed in the House on August 2, 1983, with a favorable vote of 338 to 90. The U.S. Senate also voted in favor of the measure with a vote of 78 to 22. On November 2, 1983, President Ronald Reagan signed the bill into law in ceremonies held in the White House Rose Garden in Washington, D.C.

In other legislation, Hall supported measures to reduce unemployment in her district, as well as efforts to reduce crime, substance abuse, and family bankruptcy. As a member House's Steel Caucus, she also endorsed Fair Trade in Steel Act, which was "intended to revitalize Gary’s ailing steel industry." Her voting record, which supported the Democratic majority, opposed President Reagan's legislative agenda. Hall also took two congressional trips to Ethiopia, where she became interested in famine relief in Africa.

In May 1984, Hall faced two candidates in the Democratic primary for Indiana's 1st District seat as U.S. Representative to the 99th Congress: Peter Visclosky, a former aide to Congressman Benjamin, and Lake County prosecutor Jack Crawford. Visclosky narrowly prevailed by 2,367 votes (34 percent of the total compared to Hall's 33 percent and Crawford's 31 percent. Hall filed a petition and won a suit for a recount of the votes, but it confirmed her loss to Visclosky.

=== Gary city government ===
After concluding her term in Congress in 1985, Hall returned to public service and work in Gary, Indiana, as a social studies teacher. She also remained active in Democratic politics, making two unsuccessful attempts in 1986 and 1990 to recapture the 1st District congressional seat from Visclosky in the Democratic primaries. In addition, Hall served in local government as vice chairperson of the Gary Housing Board of Commissioners and subsequently became the City Clerk of Gary in 1985.

=== Legal issues ===
In May 2002, a federal grand jury indicted Hall and her daughter, Chief Deputy Clerk Junifer Hall, on charges of racketeering, conspiracy to commit racketeering, extortion, and mail fraud. Junifer Hall was also charged with five counts of perjury. The fraud consisted of putting another daughter on the city payroll in a no-show job. Katie Hall resigned as Gary's city clerk in January 2003 after signing a plea agreement related to mail fraud. She was sentenced to house arrest and probation. Junifer Hall was sentenced to 16 months in federal prison.

== Later years ==
Hall retired from teaching in the Gary School Corporation in 2004.

== Death and legacy ==
Katie Hall died of heart failure at Gary, Indiana, on February 20, 2012, at the age of seventy-three.

Hall, the first black woman from Indiana elected to the U.S. House of Representatives, is remembered for sponsoring legislation in the U.S. House in 1983 to make Martin Luther King Jr.'s birthday a national holiday on the third Monday in January. President Ronald Reagan signed the bill into law on November 2, 1983.

== See also ==
- List of African-American United States representatives
- Women in the United States House of Representatives

U.S. House of Representatives
Preceded by Adam Benjamin, Jr.	Member of the U.S. House of Representatives from Indiana's 1st congressional district November 2, 1982 – January 3, 1985	Succeeded by Pete Visclosky
