= Vernon Smith (Indiana politician) =

American politician from Indiana

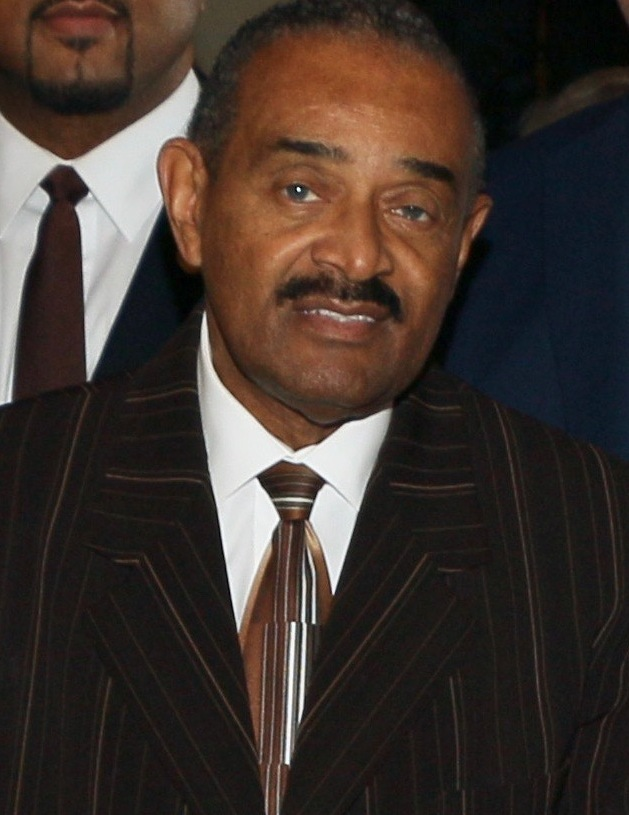

Member of the Indiana House of Representatives from the 14th district
- Incumbent
- Assumed office February 11, 1990
- Preceded by: Earline S. Rogers

Personal details
- Born: April 11, 1944 (age 82) Gary, Indiana
- Party: Democratic
- Education: Indiana University Bloomington
- Occupation: Educator

Vernon G. Smith (born April 11, 1944) is a Democratic member of the Indiana House of Representatives, representing the 14th District since 1990. He was the chair of the Indiana Black Legislative Caucus from 2006 to 2008.

Smith is a Baptist.

Smith received his bachelor of education in 1966, master of education in 1969 and doctor of education in 1978 from Indiana University Bloomington. He has taught at Indiana University Northwest since 1992.
