= PMA Group =

Lobbying firm based in Washington D.C.

The PMA Group is a defunct lobbying firm based in Washington D.C. It was founded and owned by ex-House Appropriations Subcommittee on Defense staffer Paul Magliocchetti.

The firm's annual lobbying income climbed steadily to its 2006 peak at $16.06 Million. In November 2008 the PMA Group's offices were raided by the FBI. The subsequent investigation into illegal pay to play activities has led to the resignation of five of its senior lobbyists who started their own firm and brought clients with them. As a result, the firm ceased operations on March 31, 2009.

== History and Personnel ==
The PMA Group was founded by Paul Magliocchetti in 1989. For a decade, Magliocchetti worked as a senior staffer on the House Defense Appropriations Subcommittee under its chairman, U.S. Rep. John Murtha (D-PA). In September 2007, the nonprofit Citizens for Responsibility and Ethics in Washington (CREW) ranked Murtha, a congressman for thirty-six years, one of the twenty-two "most corrupt" members of Congress, due to "alleged ethics violations stemming “from abuse of his position on the subcommittee to benefit the lobbying firm of a former long-term staffer and for threatening to block earmarks of other members for political purposes." Since Magliocchetti's departure from the defense subcommittee, PMA and its clients have established themselves as "major contributors to Murtha's campaign committee," donating well over $200,000 to the 2002, 2004, and 2006 campaign cycles, for a total of $2.37 million.

Consequently, PMA's clients have received notable benefits from Murtha's earmarks. In 2006, for example, PMA clients were given "at least 60 earmarks totaling $95.1 million." Other congressmen contacted by PMA included Pete Visclosky and Jim Moran. In 2007 and 2008, Murtha, Visclosky, and Moran directed $137 million in government purchasing to PMA's clients. PMA's clients donated $1.36 million to Visclosky and $997,348 to Moran over the past ten years.

On or around November 25, 2008 FBI agents raided PMA's offices and removed records of the firm's political action committee and files from some of its employees. According to the Washington Times, the FBI is probing the appointment by Magliocchetti of two people from Florida, a hotel wine steward and a hotel golf director, to PMA's board of directors, along with his daughter and a PMA accountant whom Magliocchetti married in 2008. All of them, as well as several relatives of Magliocchetti's, made large campaign donations, raising the question of whether Magliocchetti has illegally reimbursed them.
