= Adam Benjamin Jr. =

American politician (1935–1982)

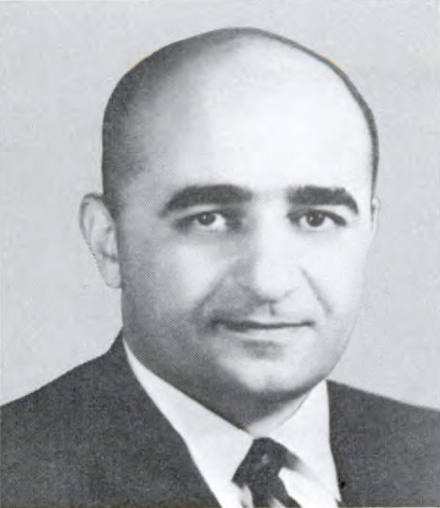

Member of the U.S. House of Representatives from Indiana's 1st district
- In office January 3, 1977 – September 7, 1982
- Preceded by: Ray J. Madden
- Succeeded by: Katie Hall

Member of the Indiana Senate
- In office 1971–1977

Member of the Indiana House of Representatives
- In office 1967–1971

Personal details
- Born: August 6, 1935 Gary, Indiana, U.S.
- Died: September 7, 1982 (aged 47) Washington, D.C., U.S.
- Resting place: Calumet Park Cemetery; Merrillville, Indiana, U.S.
- Party: Democratic
- Spouse: Patricia
- Children: 3
- Education: B.S. United States Military Academy, J.D. Valparaiso University
- Profession: Lawyer
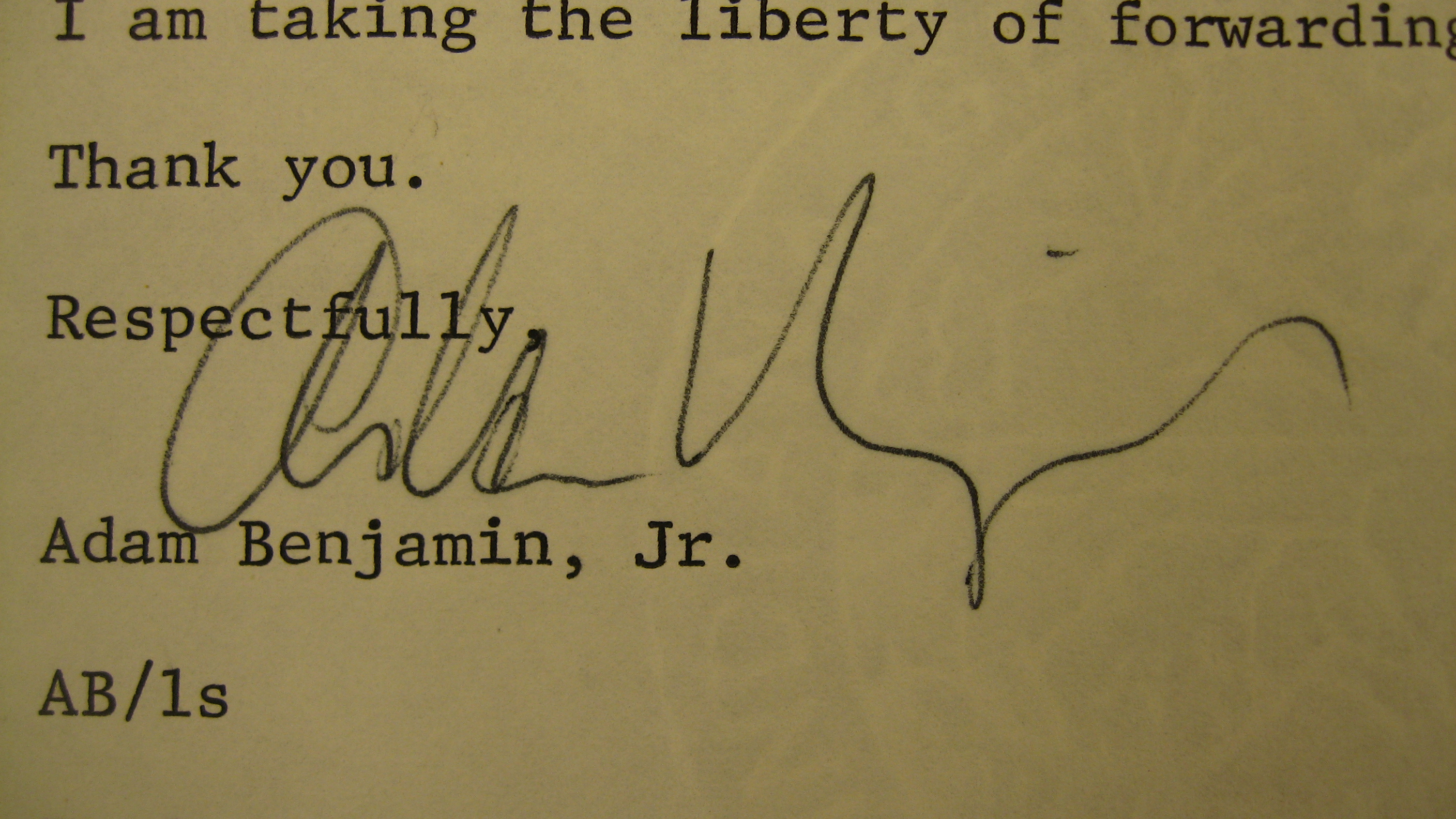
- Signature

Military service
- Branch/service: United States Marine Corps; United States Army
- Years of service: 1952–1961
- Rank: First lieutenant
- Unit: 101st Airborne Division
- Battles/wars: Korean War

Adam Benjamin Jr. (August 6, 1935 – September 7, 1982) was an American politician and a United States representative from Indiana's 1st congressional district, serving from 1977 until his death from a heart attack in Washington, D.C. in 1982. Benjamin was the first Assyrian-American to be elected to the United States House of Representatives in American history. Benjamin served in the Indiana Senate from 1971 to 1977, the Indiana House of Representatives from 1967 to 1971, and was a member of the Democratic Party.

== Early life and career ==
Born to an Assyrian father, Adam Benjamin, and Armenian mother, Margaret Marjanian, in Gary, Indiana, on August 6, 1935, Adam Benjamin Jr. graduated from Kemper Military School in Boonville, Missouri, in 1952. Benjamin joined the Marine Corps in 1952, and served as a corporal in the Korean War until he was honorably discharged in 1954. After serving in the Marine Corps, he gained an appointment to the United States Military Academy, West Point, New York, earning a B.S. degree in engineering in 1958. Following three years in the 101st airborne division the "Screaming Eagles", and ranger training in the U.S. Army, in 1961 Benjamin left the Army as a first lieutenant.

After his service in the Military, Benjamin returned to Gary in 1961 and began teaching math and physics at Edison High School. Two years later, he entered public service as Gary's zoning administrator from 1963 to 1965, and gained further experience in local government acting as Gary Mayor A. Martin Katz's executive secretary from 1965 through 1966.

During his work in public service, Benjamin attended Valparaiso University Law School, graduated with his Juris Doctor and was admitted to the Indiana Bar Association in 1966. Shortly after Benjamin was admitted to the Indiana Bar, he ran for a seat in the Indiana House of Representatives, winning two consecutive terms in 1966, and in 1968. Benjamin served in the Indiana House until he won a seat in the Indiana Senate in 1970, winning reelection in 1974, and served in the Indiana Senate from 1971 to 1977. During his time in the Indiana Senate, Benjamin was named Outstanding State Senator by newsmen assigned to report on the Indiana General Assembly. As a state legislator, Mr. Benjamin developed a new code of ethics for legislators, worked on a new state medical malpractice act, and facilitated court reform for the Lake County Superior Court system. Two years after Benjamin won a seat in the Indiana Senate, he challenged incumbent 12-term Congressman Ray J. Madden for the Democratic nomination for Indiana's 1st congressional district, but eventually lost the hotly contested primary. By 1976, having gained significant name recognition as an Indiana legislator, Benjamin again challenged Madden in the Democratic primary, this time defeating him with 56% of the vote, compared with Madden's 34%. In the general election Benjamin beat evangelical Protestant educator, and co-founder of Moral Majority, Robert J. Billings, with a 40% margin of victory.

== United States House of Representatives ==
Benjamin served in the 95th, 96th, and 97th Congresses from 1977 until his death in 1982. Benjamin sat on the House Appropriations Committee, and served as the chairman of the House Appropriations Subcommittee on Transportation, aiding Northwest Indiana with projects such as improved Amtrak facilities, new South Shore Railroad commuter cars, and funding for an I-94 interchange to provide access to the Indiana Dunes National Lakeshore as well as improvements in Gary's bus system and municipal airport. In addition, Benjamin chaired the executive committee of the Congressional Steel Caucus, a bi-partisan coalition of congressman that promotes the health and stability of the domestic steel industry. To encourage the Calumet Region's economic recovery, Benjamin worked to establish the Calumet Forum, with representatives of labor, industry, banking, publishing, education, politics, transportation, and the religious community seeking to promote the economic resurgence and development of the Region. Regarding the importance of the Forum, Benjamin commented, "I've put myself on the line for this ... I've got to do it. It just has to be done."

Benjamin continued to gain a reputation for hard work, dedication, effectiveness, and loyalty among both his colleagues and his constituents. He retained his seat in the 1978 and 1980 elections, and was seeking a fourth congressional term in 1982. However, on September 7, 1982, he was found dead in his Washington apartment, aged 47; the cause was arteriosclerosis. He is buried in Merrillville, Indiana's Calumet Park Cemetery.

Gary Metro Center in downtown Gary, Indiana and the Veterans Affairs clinic in Crown Point, Indiana, are named in his honor. Indiana State Road 51 in Hobart, Indiana is signed as the Adam Benjamin Highway.

== Personal life ==
Benjamin and his wife, Patricia, had three children.

== Electoral history ==
=== 1976 ===
Indiana's 1st congressional district election, 1976
Party	Candidate	Votes	%	±%
Democratic	Adam Benjamin Jr.	121,155	71.3	
Republican	Robert J. Billings	48,756	28.7	

=== 1978 ===
Indiana's 1st congressional district election, 1978
Party	Candidate	Votes	%	±%
Democratic	Adam Benjamin Jr.	72,367	80.2%	
Republican	Robert J. Billings	17,419	19.3	
U.S. Labor	Christopher Martinson	384	0.4%	

=== 1980 ===
Indiana's 1st congressional district election, 1980
Party	Candidate	Votes	%	±%
Democratic	Adam Benjamin Jr.	112,016	72.0%	
Republican	Joseph Douglas Harkin	43,537	28.0%	

== See also ==
- Assyrian Church of the East
- List of ethnic Assyrians
- List of Arab and Middle Eastern Americans in the United States Congress
- List of members of the United States Congress who died in office (1950–1999)

U.S. House of Representatives
Preceded by Ray J. Madden	Member of the U.S. House of Representatives from Indiana's 1st congressional district 1977–1982	Succeeded by Katie B. Hall
