= Congressional Steel Caucus =

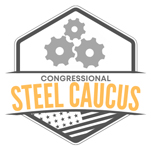
- Senate Co-Chairs: Sherrod Brown, Pat Toomey
- House Co-Chairs: Mike Bost, Rick Crawford, Conor Lamb, Frank Mrvan
- Seats in the Senate: 5 / 100
- Seats in the House: 48 / 435

The Congressional Steel Caucus is a bipartisan caucus of the United States Congress whose members represent regions with steel manufacturers or care about the health of the American steel industry. Caucus members will routinely meet with the current officials from the Administration and international organization representatives to promote the interests of the American industry and its steelworkers.

== House Steel Caucus ==
Founded in the early 1970s by Representatives John Murtha (D-PA) and Ralph Regula (R-OH), this bi-partisan coalition promotes the health and stability of the domestic steel industry, as well as the interests of its workforce.

The House Steel Caucus is extremely active on Capitol Hill, frequently holding policy-forums, media briefings, and hearings regarding issues affecting domestic steel producers and their downstream counterparts.

=== 117th Congress ===
==== Chairman ====
- Rep. Conor Lamb (D-PA-17) Retiring at end of 117th Congress.

==== Co-Chairs ====
- Rep. Mike Bost (R-IL-12)
- Rep. Rick Crawford (R-AR-1)
- Rep. Frank Mrvan (D-IN-1)

==== Members ====
- Rep. Robert Aderholt (R-AL-4)
- Rep. Jim Banks (R-IN-3)
- Rep. Gus Bilirakis (R-FL-12)
- Rep. Sanford Bishop (D-GA-2)
- Rep. Mo Brooks (R-AL-5) Retiring at end of 117th Congress.
- Rep. G. K. Butterfield (D-NC-1) Retiring at end of 117th Congress.
- Rep. Matt Cartwright (D-PA-8)
- Rep. Steve Chabot (R-OH-1)
- Rep. Steve Cohen (D-TN-9)
- Rep. Warren Davidson (R-OH-8)
- Rep. Rodney Davis (R-IL-13) Lost renomination in 2022 due to redistricting.
- Rep. Peter Defazio (D-OR-4) Retiring at end of 117th Congress.
- Rep. Rosa DeLauro (D-CT-3)
- Rep. Mike Doyle (D-PA-18) Retiring at end of 117th Congress.
- Rep. Adriano Espaillat (D-NY-13)
- Rep. John Garamendi (D-CA-3)
- Rep. Bob Gibbs (R-OH-7) Retiring at end of 117th Congress.
- Rep. Sam Graves (R-MO-6)
- Rep. Brian Higgins (D-NY-26)
- Rep. Chrissy Houlahan (D-PA-6)
- Rep. Richard Hudson (R-NC-8)
- Rep. Jim Jordan (R-OH-4)
- Rep. Dave Joyce (R-OH-14)
- Rep. Marcy Kaptur (D-OH-9)
- Rep. Mike Kelly (R-PA-16)
- Rep. Robin Kelly (D-IL-2)
- Rep. Trent Kelly (R-MS-1)
- Rep. Bob Latta (R-OH-5)
- Rep. Stephen Lynch (D-MA-8)
- Rep. Lisa McClain (R-MI-10)
- Rep. Betty McCollum (D-MN-4)
- Rep. Jim McGovern (D-MA-2)
- Rep. David McKinley (R-WV-1) Lost renomination in 2022 due to redistricting.
- Rep. Mariannette Miller-Meeks (R-IA-2)
- Rep. Grace Napolitano (D-CA-32)
- Rep. Frank Pallone (D-NJ-6)
- Rep. Tom Rice (R-SC-7) Lost renomination in 2022.
- Rep. Dutch Ruppersberger (D-MD-2)
- Rep. Tim Ryan (D-OH-13) Retiring at end of 117th Congress.
- Rep. Bobby Scott (D-VA-3)
- Rep. Fred Upton (R-MI-6) Retiring at end of 117th Congress.
- Rep. Tim Walberg (R-MI-7)
- Rep. John Yarmuth (D-KY-3) Retiring at 117th Congress.

== Senate Steel Caucus ==
A prominent Senate organization consisting of nearly three dozen members, the Caucus operates as a bi-partisan coalition advocating for domestic steel producers and workers. In addition to introducing legislation supporting the domestic steel community, members also routinely meet with Administration officials and WTO representatives to communicate the interests of American producers and labor groups.

=== 117th Congress ===
==== Co-Chairs ====
- Sen. Sherrod Brown (D-OH)
- Sen. Pat Toomey (R-PA) Retiring at end of 117th Congress.

==== Members ====
- Sen. John Boozman (R-AR)
- Sen. Lindsey Graham (R-SC)
- Sen. Debbie Stabenow (D-MI)
