= Electoral history of George McGovern =

List of elections featuring George McGovern as a candidate

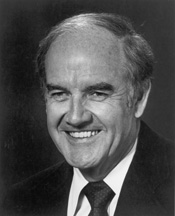
U.S. Senator George McGovern of South Dakota

George McGovern, a Democratic Party politician from South Dakota, was first elected to the United States House of Representatives to represent South Dakota's 1st congressional district in 1956. He was re-elected in 1958, before making an unsuccessful run for the United States Senate in 1960 against Republican incumbent Karl Earl Mundt. After serving in the John F. Kennedy administration as director of the Food for Peace program, McGovern ran again for the Senate and narrowly prevailed over appointed Senator Joseph H. Bottum. In 1968, McGovern unsuccessfully sought the Democratic Party's presidential nomination at the Democratic National Convention and was re-elected to the Senate over former Governor of South Dakota Archie M. Gubbrud. In 1972, McGovern was successful in his campaign for the Democratic presidential nomination, but lost the election in a landslide to incumbent President Richard Nixon. McGovern was re-elected to the Senate in 1974 over Vietnam War veteran Leo K. Thorsness, but lost re-election in 1980 to then-U.S. Representative James Abdnor. McGovern made a final unsuccessful run for president in 1984 United States presidential election.

== United States House of Representatives (1956–1958) ==
South Dakota's 1st congressional district, 1956:

- George McGovern (D) – 116,516 (52.40%)
- Harold O. Lovre (R) (inc.) – 105,835 (47.60%)

South Dakota's 1st congressional district, 1958:

- George McGovern (D) (inc.) – 107,133 (53.44%)
- Joseph Jacob "Joe" Foss (R) – 93,358 (46.56%)

== United States Senate (1960–1968) and 1968 Democratic National Convention ==
South Dakota United States Senate election, 1960:

- Karl E. Mundt (R) (inc.) – 178,417 (55.12%)
- George McGovern (D) – 145,261 (44.88%)

South Dakota United States Senate election, 1962:

- George McGovern (D) – 127,458 (50.12%)
- Joe H. Bottum (R) (inc.) – 126,681 (49.88%)

1968 Democratic National Convention (presidential tally):

- Hubert Humphrey – 1,760 (67.43%)
- Eugene McCarthy – 601 (23.03%)
- George McGovern – 147 (5.63%)
- Channing Phillips – 68 (2.61%)
- Daniel K. Moore – 18 (0.69%)
- Ted Kennedy – 13 (0.50%)
- Paul Bryant – 1 (0.04%)
- James H. Gray – 1 (0.04%)
- George Wallace – 1 (0.04%)

1968 Democratic National Convention (vice presidential tally):

- Edmund Muskie – 1,945 (74.01%)
- Abstaining – 605 (23.02%)
- Julian Bond – 49 (1.87%)
- David C. Hoeh – 4 (0.15%)
- Ted Kennedy – 4 (0.15%)
- Eugene McCarthy – 3 (0.11%)
- Richard J. Daley – 2 (0.08%)
- Don Edwards – 2 (0.08%)
- George McGovern – 2 (0.08%)
- Robert McNair – 2 (0.08%)
- Abraham A. Ribicoff – 2 (0.08%)
- James Tate – 2 (0.08%)
- Allard Lowenstein – 1 (0.04%)
- Paul O'Dwyer – 1 (0.04%)
- Henry Reuss – 1 (0.04%)
- William F. Ryan – 1 (0.04%)
- Terry Sanford – 1 (0.04%)
- Sargent Shriver – 1 (0.04%)

South Dakota United States Senate election, 1968:

- George McGovern (D) (inc.) – 158,961 (56.79%)
- Archie Gubbrud (R) – 120,951 (43.21%)

== 1972 presidential election ==
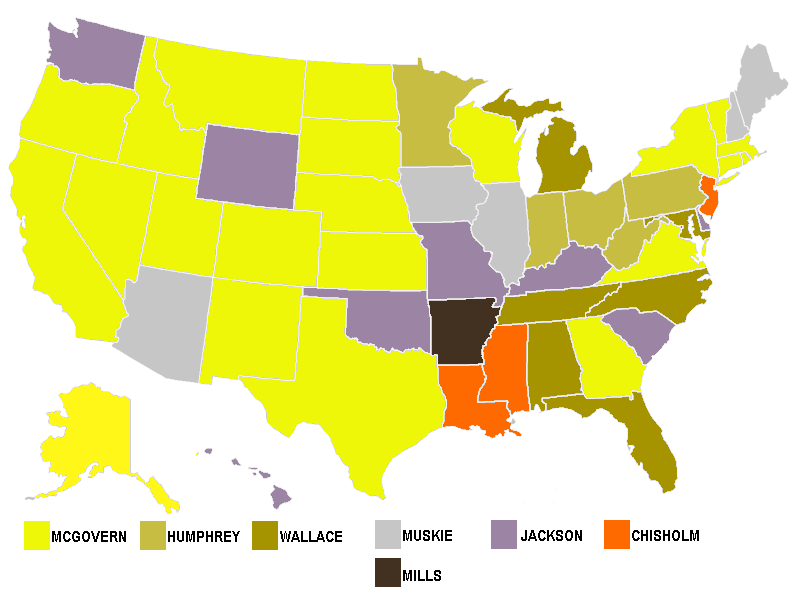
1972 Democratic primaries by state results

1972 presidential election by state results

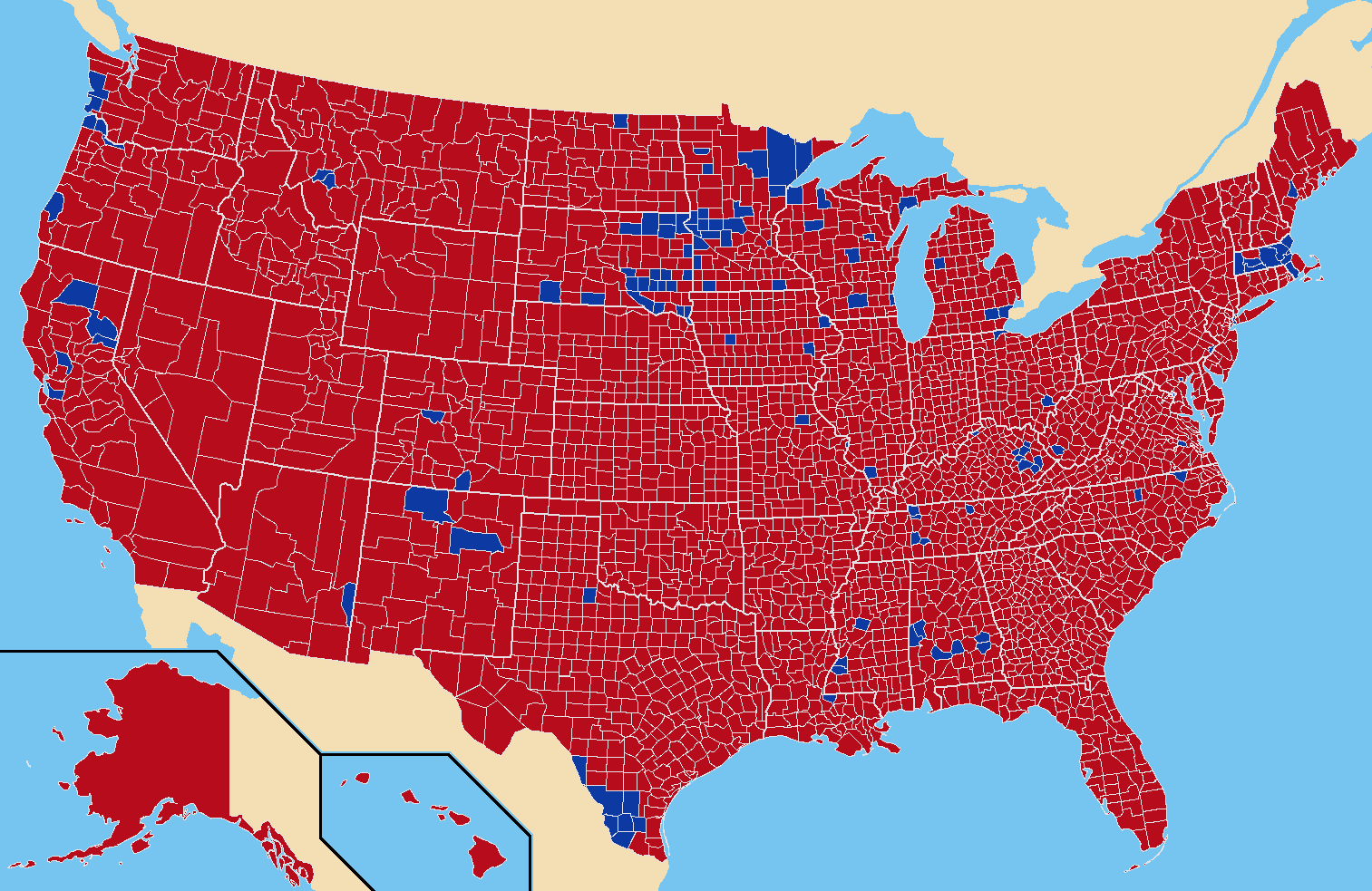
1972 presidential election by county results

1972 Democratic Presidential primaries

- Hubert Humphrey - 4,121,372 (25.77%)
- George McGovern - 4,053,451 (25.34%)
- George Wallace - 3,755,424 (23.48%)
- Edmund Muskie - 1,840,217 (11.51%)
- Eugene McCarthy - 553,990 (3.46%)
- Henry M. Jackson - 505,198 (3.16%)
- Shirley Chisholm - 430,703 (2.69%)
- Terry Sanford - 331,415 (2.07%)
- John Lindsay - 196,406 (1.23%)
- Samuel Yorty - 79,446 (0.50%)
- Wilbur Mills - 37,401 (0.23%)
- Walter E. Fauntroy - 21,217 (0.13%)
- Unpledged - 19,533 (0.12%)
- Ted Kennedy - 16,693 (0.10%)
- Vance Hartke - 11,798 (0.07%)
- Patsy Mink - 8,286 (0.05%)
- None - 6,269 (0.04%)

1972 Democratic National Convention (presidential tally):

- George McGovern - 1,729 (57.37%)
- Henry M. Jackson - 525 (17.42%)
- George Wallace - 382 (12.67%)
- Shirley Chisholm - 152 (5.04%)
- Terry Sanford - 78 (2.59%)
- Hubert Humphrey - 67 (2.22%)
- Wilbur Mills - 34 (1.13%)
- Edmund Muskie - 25 (0.83%)
- Ted Kennedy - 13 (0.43%)
- Wayne L. Hays - 5 (0.17%)
- Eugene McCarthy - 2 (0.07%)
- Ramsey Clark - 1 (0.03%)
- Walter Mondale - 1 (0.03%)

1972 Liberal Party Convention (presidential tally):

- George McGovern - 218 (95.61%)
- Benjamin Spock - 8 (3.51%)
- Abstaining - 2 (0.88%)

1972 United States presidential election:

- Richard Nixon/Spiro Agnew (R) (inc.) - 47,168,710 (60.7%) and 520 electoral votes (49 states carried)
- George McGovern/Sargent Shriver (D) - 29,173,222 (37.5%) and 17 electoral votes (1 state and D.C. carried)
- John Hospers/Theodora Nathan (LBT) - 3,674 (0.0%) and 1 electoral vote (Virginia Republican faithless elector)
- John G. Schmitz/Thomas J. Anderson (AI) - 1,100,868 (1.4%)
- Linda Jenness/Andrew Pulley (Socialist Workers) - 83,380 (0.1%)
- Benjamin Spock/Julius Hobson (People's) - 78,759 (0.1%)
- Others - 135,414 (0.2%)

South Dakota United States Senate election, 1974:

- George McGovern (D) (inc.) - 147,929 (53.04%)
- Leo K. Thorsness (R) - 130,955 (46.96%)

== United States Senate (1974–1980) and 1980 Democratic National Convention ==
Democratic primary for United States Senate, South Dakota, 1980:

- George McGovern (inc.) - 44,822 (62.44%)
- Larry Schumaker - 26,958 (37.56%)

1980 Democratic National Convention (vice Presidential tally)

- Walter Mondale (inc.) - 2,429 (72.99%)
- Abstaining - 724 (21.76%)
- Melvin Boozer - 49 (1.44%)
- Ed Rendell - 28 (0.84%)
- Roberto A. Mondragon - 19 (0.57%)
- Patricia Stone Simon - 11 (0.33%)
- Tom Daschle - 10 (0.30%)
- Ted Kulongoski - 8 (0.24%)
- Terry Chisholm - 6 (0.18%)
- Shirley Chisholm - 6 (0.18%)
- Barbara Jordan - 4 (0.12%)
- Richard M. Nolan - 4 (0.12%)
- Patrick Joseph Lucey - 3 (0.09%)
- Jerry Brown - 2 (0.06%)
- George McGovern - 2 (0.06%)
- Eric Tovar - 2 (0.06%)
- Mo Udall - 2 (0.06%)
- Les Aspin, Mario Biaggi, George S. Broody, Michelle Kathleen Gray, Michael J. Harrington, Frank Johnson, Paul Karratz, Eunice Kennedy Shriver, Dennis Krumm, Mary Ann Kuharski, Jim McDermott, Barbara Mikulski, Gaylord Nelson, George Orwell, Charles Prine, William A. Redmond, Jim Thomas, Elly Uharis, Jim Weaver, William Winpisinger - each 1 vote (0.03%)

South Dakota United States Senate election, 1980:

- James Abdnor (R) - 190,594 (58.20%)
- George McGovern (D) (inc.) - 129,018 (39.40%)
- Wayne Peterson (I) - 7,866 (2.40%)

== 1984 presidential election ==
1984 Democratic Party presidential primaries

- Walter Mondale - 6,952,912 (38.32%)
- Gary Hart - 6,504,842 (35.85%)
- Jesse Jackson - 3,282,431 (18.09%)
- John Glenn - 617,909 (3.41%)
- George McGovern - 334,801 (1.85%)
- Unpledged - 146,212 (0.81%)
- Lyndon LaRouche - 123,649 (0.68%)
- Reubin O'Donovan Askew - 52,759 (0.29%)
- Alan Cranston - 51,437 (0.28%)
- Ernest Hollings - 33,684 (0.19%)

1984 Democratic National Convention

- Walter Mondale - 2,191 (56.41%)
- Gary Hart - 1,201 (30.92%)
- Jesse Jackson - 466 (12.00%)
- Thomas F. Eagleton - 18 (0.46%)
- George McGovern - 4 (0.10%)
- John Glenn - 2 (0.05%)
- Joe Biden - 1 (0.03%)
- Martha Kirkland - 1 (0.03%)
