= Jonathan Zucker =

American businessman

Jonathan Zucker (born December 23, 1971) is an American political technology entrepreneur and campaign finance attorney best known as the founder of Democracy Engine, the first COO and second CEO of ActBlue and the founder of Every State Blue (founded as It Starts Today).

== History ==
Zucker worked at the Democratic National Committee from 2003–2005, as the National Director of Operations for Finance, overseeing technology, legal, compliance, vetting, and data-management for the DNC's $100 million major-donor program. Prior to the DNC, Zucker worked with progressive and Democratic organizations as a fundraiser, legal counsel, and field organizer, including The Interfaith Alliance, Human Rights Campaign, GenderPAC, and the Democratic Leadership Council. Zucker was later the first employee of ActBlue, where he was Senior Strategist & Counsel, COO & Counsel, and Executive Director (CEO) between 2005 and 2008.

== Political startups ==
Zucker is involved in two current organizations:

- Democracy Engine — which he founded in 2009 and is CEO—is a nonpartisan online donation processing platform to handle fundraising for candidates at all level of US elections as well as political committees and nonprofits.
- Every State Blue —which he founded in 2017 as It Starts Today—is a partisan Democratic PAC that operates an online donation platform soliciting monthly donations that fund state legislative candidates who do not otherwise have funding. In 2026, ESB supported 630 state legislative nominees and operated Blue Missouri, Blue Ohio, and Blue Tennessee.

Past projects include:

- CrowdPAC — founded by Steve Hilton and for which he was Strategist and Counsel — used data on political candidates to recommend them to users based on each user's interests. Crowdpac ceased operations in June 2019.
- if.then.fund — co-founded with Joshua Tauberer uses votes on legislation (and other congressional business) as the trigger for campaign contributions to re-elect or oppose members of Congress.
- Ruck.us — which he joined in 2013 as co-Founder and COO—is a digital toolkit for down-ballot political candidates, he left his role as COO in 2016.
- Candi-Date (founded by Zucker in 2011) used nonprofit scorecards of incumbents to recommend candidates based on user interest.
- ActBlue — which he joined in March 2005 as the first employee, going on to be the first COO and second CEO (Executive Director) before leaving at end of 2008.

== Campaign finance law ==
Zucker has been involved with numerous advisory opinion requests to the Federal Election Commission in the area of technology and fundraising, including:

- AO 2006-30, in which the FEC permitted fundraising for an individual who had not yet declared for office.
- AO 2007-27, in which ActBlue requested permission to raise funds on behalf of Separate Segregated Funds.
- AOR 2007-35, in which Zucker advised FreeCause, Inc, in an attempt to receive permission to implement a browser tool bar that used commissions from online shopping to make contributions to political candidates. The FEC was unable to address the merits of the request due to it only having 2 members at the time of the request. The Office of General Counsel issued a draft opinion favorable to the request.
- AO 2008-08, in which Zucker sought clarification about the application of biennial contribution limits (these limits were overturned by the US Supreme Court in McCutcheon v. FEC) to a donation made to a future, as yet undetermined, candidate.
- AOR 2009-28, in which the FEC deadlocked on partisan lines in response to Zucker's request from a Separate Segregated Fund to accept earmarked contributions from non-members of the SSF. The initial draft from the FEC's Office of General Council provided a favorable answer to the request.
- AO 2011-06, in which Democracy Engine received permission to operate as a vendor, establishing a new model for political fundraising technology.
- AO 2014-07, in which Crowdpac received permission to operate as one of the most disruptive new forces in campaign finance.
- AO 2019-01, in which It Starts Today (now Every State Blue) received permission to solicit conditional earmarked donations to future party nominees.
- AO 2022-03, in which Democracy Engine received permission for political committee clients (specifically corporate separate segregated funds (SSFs) to use the company's web platform to solicit and track contributions to federal candidates and political committees.

== Education ==
Zucker holds a B.A. in Political Science from Yale and a J.D. from Georgetown University.
