= Heatherly =

Heatherly is an English surname. Notable people with the surname include:

- Charles Heatherly (born 1942), American politician
- Eric Heatherly (born 1970), American singer
- May Heatherly (1942–2015), American actress
