= Clint Roberts (politician) =

American politician (1935–2017)

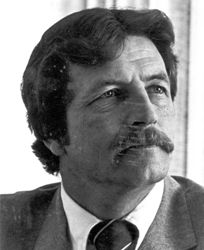

Member of the U.S. House of Representatives from South Dakota's 2nd district
- In office January 3, 1981 – January 3, 1983
- Preceded by: James Abdnor
- Succeeded by: District abolished

Member of the South Dakota Senate
- In office 1972–1978

Personal details
- Born: Clint Ronald Roberts; January 30, 1935 Presho, South Dakota, U.S.
- Died: February 12, 2017 (aged 82) Pierre, South Dakota, U.S.
- Resting place: Presho Cemetery in Presho
- Party: Republican

Clint Ronald Roberts (January 30, 1935 – February 12, 2017) was an American rancher, Marlboro man, and one term U.S. representative from South Dakota, serving from 1981 to 1983.

== Early life and education ==
Roberts was born in Presho, South Dakota, and attended Black Hills State College from 1952 to 1953. Roberts was a rancher.

== Political career ==
Roberts was a member of the South Dakota Senate from 1972 to 1978 and served as Secretary of the South Dakota Department of Agriculture from 1979 to 1980.

=== Congress ===
In 1980 he was elected to the United States House of Representatives as a Republican. He succeeded James Abdnor, who was elected to the U.S. Senate that year. After South Dakota lost its 2nd District due to redistricting in 1982, Roberts ran against Tom Daschle, then the representative from the 1st District. He lost to Daschle in the race for the at-large seat.

=== Gubernatorial campaigns ===
Roberts twice ran for Governor of South Dakota, in 1978 and 1986, but failed to gain the Republican nomination on both occasions.

== Movie career ==
Roberts auditioned for the cigarette commercial "The Marlboro Man", and was nicknamed "the Marlboro Man." He also was in several commercials and movies in the role of a cowboy. He also did tourist promotions for South Dakota.

== Later life and death ==
Roberts retired to a home in Fort Pierre, South Dakota. Roberts died in a hospital in Pierre, South Dakota, from chronic obstructive pulmonary disease (COPD) on February 12, 2017, at the age of 82. He was buried at Presho Cemetery in Presho, South Dakota.

U.S. House of Representatives
Preceded by James Abdnor	Member of the U.S. House of Representatives from South Dakota's 2nd congressional district 1981 – 1983	District eliminated
