= List of Arab and Middle Eastern Americans in the United States Congress =

This article is a list of all Arab Americans and Middle Eastern Americans who have ever served in the United States Congress. This list includes persons of North African or Horn of Africa native ancestry who identify as Arabs, as well as Middle Eastern Americans who are not Arabs. Middle Eastern Americans are defined by people who have ancestry identifying from Southwest Asia and North Africa. This includes North African countries, the Arab Peninsula, Levant, Horn of Africa, Turkey, and the Iranian Plateau which encompasses Iran and Afghanistan.

The first Arab American to serve in the U.S. House of Representatives was George A. Kasem in 1959, and the first Arab-American U.S. senator was James Abourezk in 1973. In the 115th Congress, there were six U.S. representatives and no U.S. senators of Arab-American descent serving in Congress. On November 6, 2018, four additional Arab Americans, all of whom are female, were elected to the U.S. House of Representatives: Debbie Mucarsel-Powell, Ilhan Omar, Donna Shalala, and Rashida Tlaib. Tlaib and Omar were also the first Muslim women in Congress. The U.S. House of Representatives currently has five Arab-American members.

The first Assyrian American to serve in the U.S. House of Representatives was Adam Benjamin in 1977, and the first Persian-American U.S. representative was Stephanie Bice in 2021. The first Egyptian-American and Coptic-American U.S. senator was George Helmy in 2024. Up until January 3, 2025, Congress had an Assyrian-American U.S. representative, Anna Eshoo, who retired after serving 16 terms in the House.

== Senate ==
Name (lifespan)	Ethnicity	Religion	Party	State	Start	End	Notes
James Abourezk (1931–2023)	Lebanese	Maronite Catholic	Democratic	South Dakota	January 3, 1973	January 3, 1979	Retired
George J. Mitchell (born 1933)	Lebanese	Maronite Catholic	Democratic	Maine	May 17, 1980	January 3, 1995	Retired
James Abdnor (1923–2012)	Lebanese	Christian	Republican	South Dakota	January 3, 1981	January 3, 1987	Lost reelection
Spencer Abraham (born 1952)	Lebanese	Eastern Orthodox	Republican	Michigan	January 3, 1995	January 3, 2001	Lost reelection
John E. Sununu (born 1964)	Palestinian, Lebanese	Eastern Orthodox	Republican	New Hampshire	January 3, 2003	January 3, 2009	Lost reelection
George Helmy (born 1979)	Egyptian (Coptic)	Oriental Orthodox	Democratic	New Jersey	September 9, 2024	December 8, 2024	Appointed following the resignation of Bob Menendez Resigned to allow for the appointment of Andy Kim

=== Senators-elect ===
Name (lifespan)	Ethnicity	Religion	Party	State	Start	Notes
Abdul El-Sayed (born 1984)	Egyptian	Muslim	Democratic	Michigan	January 3, 2027	Elect

== House of Representatives ==
Name (lifespan)	Ethnicity	Religion	Party	State	Start	End	Notes
George A. Kasem (1919–2002)	Lebanese	Christian	Democratic	California	January 3, 1959	January 3, 1961	Lost reelection
Abraham Kazen (1919–1987)	Lebanese	Maronite Catholic	Democratic	Texas	January 3, 1967	January 3, 1985	Lost renomination
James Abourezk (1931–2023)	Lebanese	Maronite Catholic	Democratic	South Dakota	January 3, 1971	January 3, 1973	Retired to run successfully for U.S. Senator from South Dakota
James Abdnor (1923–2012)	Lebanese	Christian	Republican	South Dakota	January 3, 1973	January 3, 1981	Retired to run successfully for U.S. Senator from South Dakota
Toby Moffett (born 1944)	Lebanese	Maronite Catholic	Democratic	Connecticut	January 3, 1975	January 3, 1983	Retired to run unsuccessfully for U.S. Senator from Connecticut
Adam Benjamin (1935–1982)	Assyrian	Christian	Democratic	Indiana	January 3, 1977	September 7, 1982	Died in office
Mary Rose Oakar (1940–2025)	Lebanese, Syrian	Eastern Catholic	Democratic	Ohio	January 3, 1977	January 3, 1993	Lost reelection
Nick Rahall (born 1949)	Lebanese	Melkite Catholic	Democratic	West Virginia	January 3, 1977	January 3, 2015	Lost reelection
Pat Danner (born 1934)	Lebanese	Baptist	Democratic	Missouri	January 3, 1993	January 3, 2001	Retired
Anna Eshoo (born 1942)	Assyrian	Chaldean Catholic	Democratic	California	January 3, 1993	January 3, 2025	Retired
John Baldacci (born 1955)	Lebanese	Roman Catholic	Democratic	Maine	January 3, 1995	January 3, 2003	Retired to run successfully for Governor of Maine
Ray LaHood (born 1945)	Lebanese	Roman Catholic	Republican	Illinois	January 3, 1995	January 3, 2009	Retired to become U.S. Secretary of Transportation
Chris John (born 1960)	Lebanese	Roman Catholic	Democratic	Louisiana	January 3, 1997	January 3, 2005	Retired to run unsuccessfully for U.S. Senator from Louisiana
John E. Sununu (born 1964)	Palestinian, Lebanese	Eastern Orthodox	Republican	New Hampshire	January 3, 1997	January 3, 2003	Retired to run successfully for U.S. Senator from New Hampshire
Darrell Issa (born 1953)	Lebanese	Eastern Orthodox	Republican	California	January 3, 2001	January 3, 2019	Retired
Darrell Issa (born 1953)	Lebanese	Eastern Orthodox	Republican	California	January 3, 2021	January 3, 2027	Retiring
Charles Boustany (born 1956)	Lebanese	Maronite Catholic	Republican	Louisiana	January 3, 2005	January 3, 2017	Retired to run unsuccessfully for U.S. Senator from Louisiana
Justin Amash (born 1980)	Palestinian, Syrian	Eastern Orthodox	Republican (2011–2019)	Michigan	January 3, 2011	January 3, 2021	Retired
Justin Amash (born 1980)	Palestinian, Syrian	Eastern Orthodox	Independent (2019–2020)	Michigan	January 3, 2011	January 3, 2021	Retired
Justin Amash (born 1980)	Palestinian, Syrian	Eastern Orthodox	Libertarian (2020–2021)	Michigan	January 3, 2011	January 3, 2021	Retired
Richard L. Hanna (1951–2020)	Lebanese	Presbyterian	Republican	New York	January 3, 2011	January 3, 2017	Retired
Ralph Abraham (born 1954)	Lebanese	Baptist	Republican	Louisiana	January 3, 2015	January 3, 2021	Retired
Gwen Graham (born 1963)	Lebanese	Episcopalian	Democratic	Florida	January 3, 2015	January 3, 2017	Retired
Garret Graves (born 1972)	Lebanese	Roman Catholic	Republican	Louisiana	January 3, 2015	January 3, 2025	Retired
Darin LaHood (born 1968)	Lebanese	Roman Catholic	Republican	Illinois	September 10, 2015	Incumbent	
Charlie Crist (born 1956)	Greek Cypriot, Lebanese	Episcopalian	Democratic	Florida	January 3, 2017	August 31, 2022	Resigned
Rubén Kihuen (born 1980)	Lebanese	Roman Catholic	Democratic	Nevada	January 3, 2017	January 3, 2019	Retired
Debbie Mucarsel-Powell (born 1971)	Lebanese	Roman Catholic	Democratic	Florida	January 3, 2019	January 3, 2021	Lost reelection
Ilhan Omar (born 1981)	Somali (Note: Although Somalis are not considered ethnically Arab, Somalia is considered to be part of the Arab World, being a member nation of the Arab League, and Omar was listed in the Arab American Institute's 2019 list of officeholders.)	Sunni Muslim	Democratic	Minnesota	January 3, 2019	Incumbent	
Donna Shalala (born 1941)	Lebanese	Maronite Catholic	Democratic	Florida	January 3, 2019	January 3, 2021	Lost reelection
Rashida Tlaib (born 1976)	Palestinian	Sunni Muslim	Democratic	Michigan	January 3, 2019	Incumbent	
Stephanie Bice (born 1973)	Persian	Roman Catholic	Republican	Oklahoma	January 3, 2021	Incumbent	
Yassamin Ansari (born 1992)	Persian	Agnostic (born to Muslim parents)	Democratic	Arizona	January 3, 2025	Incumbent	
Abraham Hamadeh (born 1991)	Syrian	Non-denominational (born to a Muslim father and Druze mother)	Republican	Arizona	January 3, 2025	Incumbent	

=== Representatives-elect ===
Name (lifespan)	Ethnicity	Party	State	Start	Notes
Daniel Biss (born 1977)	Israeli	Democratic	Illinois	January 3, 2027	Elect
Adam Hamawy (born 1969/1970)	Egyptian	Democratic	New Jersey	January 3, 2027	Elect
Dan Koh (born 1985)	Lebanese	Democratic	Massachusetts	January 3, 2027	Elect
Stefany Shaheen (born 1974)	Lebanese	Democratic	New Hampshire	January 3, 2027	Elect

== See also ==
- List of Jewish members of the United States Congress
