= Ruck.us =

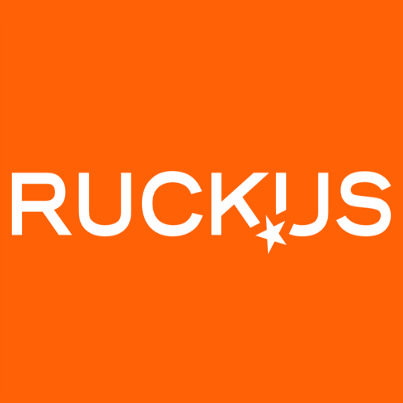

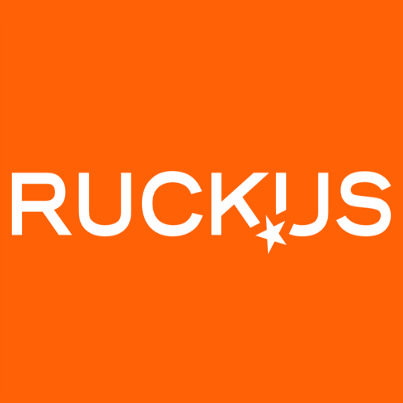
- Industry: Software; campaigns; civic technology
- Founded: 2011
- Headquarters: Washington, D.C.
- Key people: Nathan Daschle, Jonathan Zucker, and Leo Wang
- Products: Consumer Technology Company
- Revenue: N/A
- Website: Ruck.us - 2019 archive

Ruck.us was a political website builder designed for American candidates and organizations seeking state and local-level political office. It was designed for ease of use.

== History ==
Ruck.us was founded by Nathan Daschle, former executive director of the Democratic Governors Association and son of former Senator Tom Daschle, and Raymond Glendening, former Democratic Governors Association political director and son of former Maryland Governor Parris Glendening, in 2011. It began as a second generation social network for politicians intending to break up the two-party system.

In late 2013, Daschle "realized that while technology has revolutionized the more well-funded campaigns, basic tools were still out of reach for the over 1 million candidates at the state and local level" and pivoted into the campaign technology business. He was joined by Jonathan Zucker, the founder of the political fundraising company Democracy Engine and former executive director of ActBlue, as co-founder, CTO and Head of Product, and angel investor. Consultant Leo Wang joined as co-founder and Chief Strategy Officer.

Ruck.us' Board of Advisors included presidential strategist Mark McKinnon, former Bloomberg for Mayor campaign manager Bradley Tusk, well-known pundit and strategist Joe Trippi, former mayor of Washington D.C., Adrian Fenty, and several others.

== Feature set ==
Ruck.us aimed to offer tools to create a “professional and highly functional campaign website".

Its feature set:

- Online donation processing through Democracy Engine
- Facebook and Twitter integration
- Photo and video hosting
- Space for a candidate or organization biography
- "Issues statement" panels for staking positions on specific topics
- Event management
- Space for press clips

In February 2015, Ruck.us unveiled “Ruck.us Premium,” an expanded feature set which offers users more tools, like custom domain names and multiple-administrator support, for a monthly fee.

== Recognition ==
In recognition of the platform's potential, Nathan Daschle was named as being one of Campaigns & Elections Magazine's Top 50 Political Influencers for 2014 for his work on Ruck.us and his commitment to “better meet the digital demands of campaigns lower down the ballot.”

== Status ==
In the 2014 election cycle, Ruck.us partnered with the Democratic Party of Michigan, Maryland and Idaho, bringing hundreds of candidates and organizations online in those states and securing an additional $500,000 in funding and investment. Since then it has formed partnerships with the Democratic Party of Georgia, Louisiana, and the Association of State Democratic Chairs.
