= 1986 United States Senate election in South Dakota =

- November 4, 1986
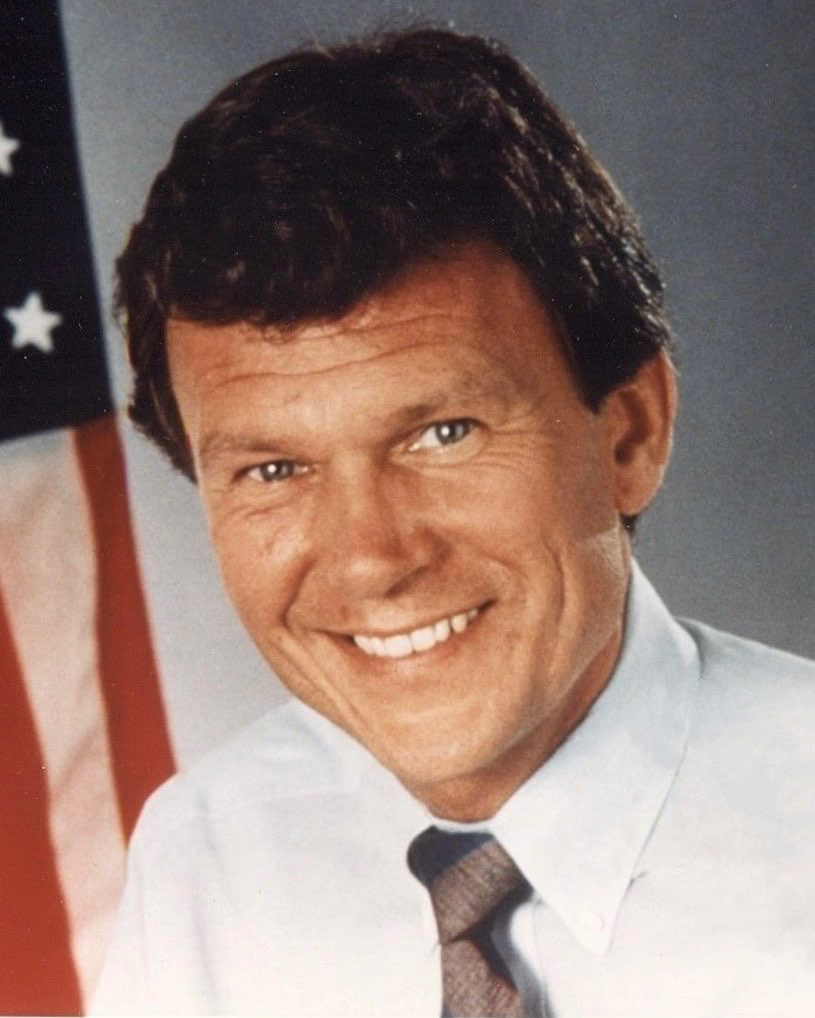

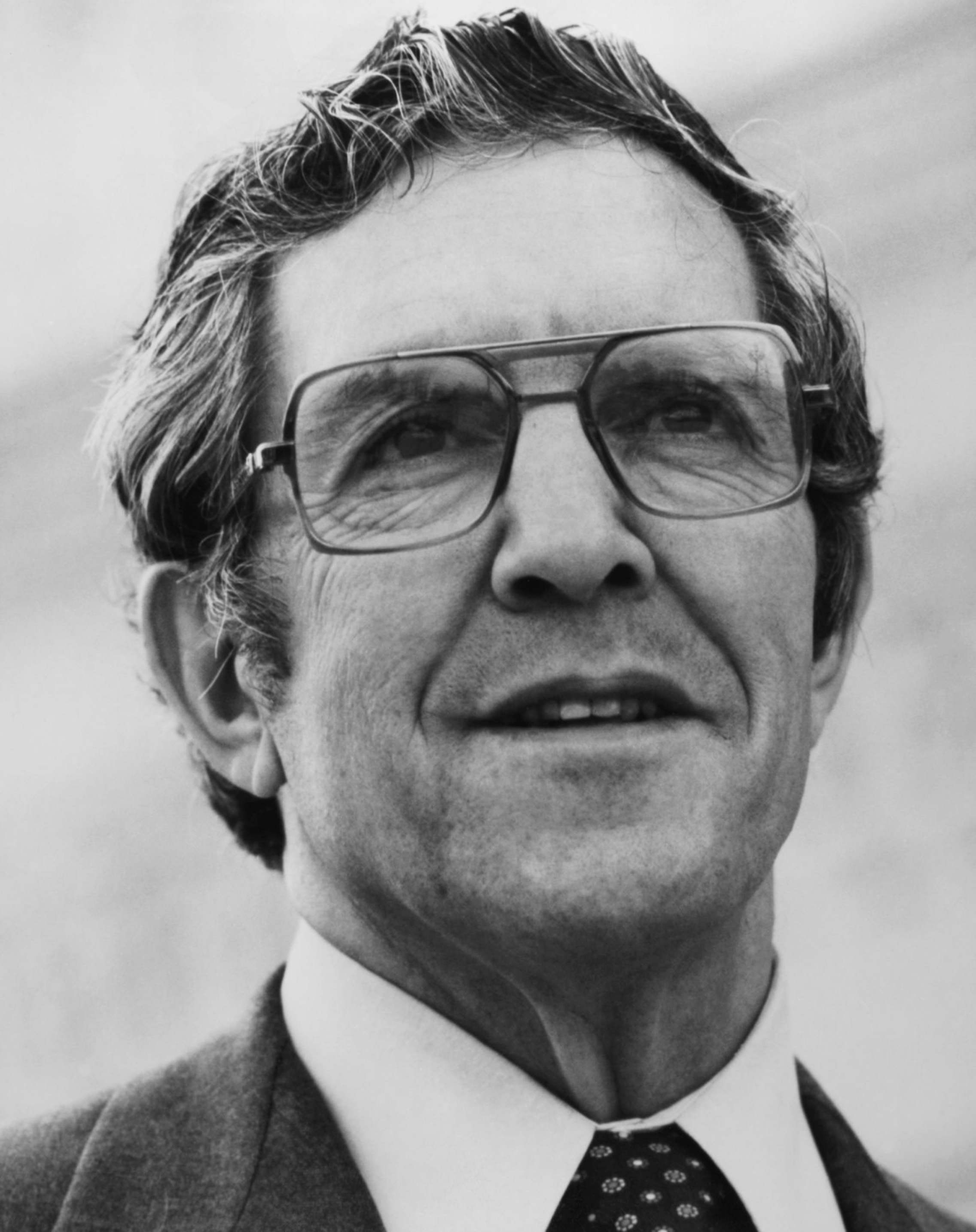
Nominee	Tom Daschle	James Abdnor
Party	Democratic	Republican
Popular vote	152,657	143,173
Percentage	51.60%	48.40%
- County results Daschle: 50–60% 60–70% 70–80% 80–90% Abdnor: 50–60% 60–70% 70–80%
U.S. senator before election
James Abdnor
Republican
Elected U.S. Senator
Tom Daschle
Democratic

The 1986 United States Senate election in South Dakota was held on November 4, 1986. Incumbent Republican U.S. Senator James Abdnor ran for re-election to a second term, but was defeated by Democrat and future Senate Majority Leader Tom Daschle. This was the only one of Daschle's Senate races that he won with less than 60% of the vote.

== Republican primary ==
=== Candidates ===
- James Abdnor, incumbent U.S. Senator
- Bill Janklow, Governor of South Dakota

=== Results ===
Although Abdnor won the primary by a fairly comfortable margin, it hurt him badly. Daschle was uncontested for the Democratic nomination and therefore was able to focus on the general election early, while Abdnor had to fight a challenge from a popular incumbent governor. Many political analysts say this was one of the factors in Abdnor's general election loss.

Republican Primary results by county: Abdnor: 50–60%; 60–70%; 70–80%; 80–90%; Janklow: 50–60%; 60–70%; 70–80%

Republican primary results
Party	Candidate	Votes	%
Republican	James Abdnor (incumbent)	63,414	54.51%
Republican	Bill Janklow	52,924	45.49%
Total votes		116,338	100.00%

== General election ==
=== Candidates ===
- James Abdnor (R), incumbent U.S. Senator
- Tom Daschle (D), U.S. Representative

=== Results ===
General election results
Party	Candidate	Votes	%	±%
Democratic	Tom Daschle	152,657	51.60%	+12.21%
Republican	James Abdnor (incumbent)	143,173	48.40%	−9.80%
Total votes		295,830	100.00%	N/A
Democratic gain from Republican				

== See also ==
- 1986 United States Senate elections
