= James P. Cain =

American diplomat

James Cain
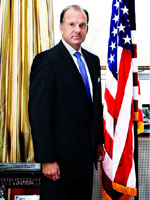

United States Ambassador to Denmark
- In office September 9, 2005 – January 24, 2009
- President: George W. Bush
- Preceded by: Stuart Bernstein
- Succeeded by: Laurie Fulton

Personal details
- Born: October 23, 1957 (age 68) High Point, North Carolina, U.S.
- Party: Republican
- Education: Wake Forest University (BA, JD)

James P. Cain (born October 23, 1957) is a hockey team executive and former United States Ambassador to Denmark from July 2005 to January 2009. He was appointed by President George W. Bush on June 30, 2005. He was replaced by Laurie S. Fulton. Cain is a member of the North Carolina Republican Party. He is a former president of the National Hockey League team, Carolina Hurricanes, a position that he held before becoming an ambassador.

== Early life, education, and family ==
Cain was born and raised in High Point, North Carolina. He earned a B.A. degree in Politics and a J.D degree from Wake Forest University, where he was a member of Sigma Chi fraternity.

In 2016, Alexander Pinczowski, who was engaged to Cain's daughter Cameron, was killed during a March 22, 2016 ISIS Bombing of the Brussels-National Airport. Cain subsequently acted as the representative of the Pinczowski family, providing the press with Facebook posts from Sascha Pinczowski (also killed in the bombing), a Dutch national and sister of Alexander who had promoted open borders and welcoming of refugees into Belgium.

== Business career ==
He was with the international law firm of Kilpatrick Stockton for 20 years, co-founding the firm's Research Triangle office in 1985. As a lawyer, Cain focused his legal practice on advising corporate and government clients on strategies relating to growth, economic development and community enhancement.

Cain took a leave of absence from Kilpatrick Stockton from January 2000 to November 2002 to serve as the President and Chief Operating Officer of the National Hockey League Carolina Hurricanes and their parent company, Gale Force Holdings. He stepped down after the team went to the Stanley Cup Finals in 2002. He took another leave of absence in 2005 to become U.S. Ambassador to Denmark. He rejoined the firm in March 2009.

Cain served in leadership positions for numerous civic and non-profit institutions, including the Raleigh Chamber of Commerce, Character Education Foundation, American Red Cross, American Diabetes Association, and Boy Scouts of America. He has chaired the Boards of the Food Bank of North Carolina, Communities in Schools of Wake County, and the Eastern North Carolina Chamber of Commerce. Cain was named "Business Leader of the Year" by Business Leader Magazine, received the John Ross Leadership Award from the Greater Raleigh Convention and Visitors Bureau, and received the National Outstanding Community Service Award from the American Diabetes Association in 2003.

He has received numerous awards including "Business Leader of the Year", "John Ross Leadership Award", and "National Outstanding Community Service Award."

In 2020, Delta Crescent Energy LLC, a company partnered by Cain and James Reese, a former officer in the Delta Force, signed an agreement with the Autonomous Administration of North and East Syria to develop oil fields in the region.

As of 2026, Cain continues to serve as a Director for Alexandria Real Estate Equities, Inc., a position he has held since 2015.

== Political career ==
=== Activism ===
Cain served as Republican National Committeeman for North Carolina from 2003 to 2005, and served as Regional Chairman and the State Finance Vice Chairman for Bush's 2004 presidential campaign. He served as President Bush's Emissary to the Philippines for the inauguration of President Gloria Macapagal Arroyo in 2004.

=== Ambassadorship ===
Cain was nominated by President Bush as U.S. Ambassador to Denmark on June 30, 2005. Following confirmation by the U.S. Senate on July 29, Ambassador Cain took the oath of office in the Old House Chamber of the State Capitol in Raleigh, North Carolina on August 10, 2005. He and his family arrived in Denmark on August 14, 2005, and departed Denmark on January 23, 2009.

During his three and a half years in Denmark, Cain oversaw the 13 agencies of the American government that comprised the 150-person US Embassy in Copenhagen. His efforts focused on areas of national security, counter-terrorism, alternative energy and energy security, commerce and investment, and promotion of shared values.

Cain was a strong believer in public diplomacy, getting out of the Embassy and "Selling America". His efforts included a 37-day, 1,500 mile "Rediscovery Tour" of Denmark by bicycle, and the publication in December 2008 of the book The American: On Diplomacy, Democracy and Denmark. On January 16, 2009, Ambassador Cain received the Grand Cross of the Order of the Dannebrog bestowed by Queen Margrethe II. Cain is also a member of the Royal Copenhagen Shooting Society, Sølyst, Klampenborg. The Society only allows new members, which are invited by existing ones.

=== WikiLeaks ===
In December, 2010, Cain called for the death penalty for Chelsea Manning, the U.S. soldier alleged to have supplied WikiLeaks with diplomatic cables and Iraq War logs. He said, "The cables I wrote, they were written for the president, and they're to guide the president on his decision-making. If you disclose those publicly, it can do severe damage to our national security and is, in my opinion, high treason." Cain was quoted in one of the released diplomatic cables as having sought to prevent the Danish newspaper Jyllands-Posten from reprinting a series of controversial Muhammad cartoons in 2006.

=== Politics ===
In May 2013, Cain told the press that he was considering running for the U.S. Senate, saying "The race is indeed something that I am considering. Many friends and supporters around the state are encouraging me to challenge Senator Hagan." Cain chose not to run, and Hagan was defeated in the election by Thom Tillis, Speaker of the North Carolina House of Representatives.

Diplomatic posts
Preceded by Stuart Bernstein	U.S. Ambassador to Denmark; 2005–2009	Succeeded by Laurie Fulton
