= Mail-in-a-Box =

Open Source software for mail server hosting

- Original author: Joshua Tauberer
- Release: August 2013; 13 years ago
- Stable release: v76 / 24 May 2026; 3 months ago
- Written in: Python
- Operating system: Ubuntu Server 22.04
- Available in: English
- Type: Email service
- License: CC0
- Website: mailinabox.email
- Repository: github.com/mail-in-a-box/mailinabox/

Mail-in-a-Box is a free and open-source program for mail server hosting developed by Joshua Tauberer. The software's goal is to enable any user to turn a cloud system into a mail server in a few hours. The tool enables developers to host mail for multiple users and multiple domain names.

The default configuration provides a spam detection system, monitoring, reporting and backup mechanisms. It can also set up and automatically renew a Let's Encrypt certificate, as well as configuring the detailed DNS configurations needed to ensure that a mail server's IP address is trusted by other servers, and less likely to be blacklisted. Its support for IMAP/SMTP facilitates synchronizing across devices.

First developed in 2013 by Tauberer, the tool is written in Python and Bash. The project supports Ubuntu LTS.

It has been recommended by the notable Hackaday and MakeTechEasier.
