= Nathan Daschle =

American political strategist

Nathan Daschle (born December 10, 1973) is a political strategist who is the CEO of DB3, a full-service bipartisan lobbying & strategic advocacy firm. He was previously President & COO of The Daschle Group, and Executive Vice President for Political Strategy at Clear Channel Media and Entertainment, where he ran a business unit dedicated to political advertising. Daschle was also the founder and CEO of Ruck.us, which provides a digital toolkit for political candidates.

== Early life and education ==
Nathan Daschle was born on December 10, 1973, in Washington D.C. to Tom Daschle (later a U.S. Representative and Senator) and Laurie S. Fulton (later the United States Ambassador to Denmark). Daschle received his B.A., with distinction, from Northwestern University in 1995 and his J.D., cum laude, from Harvard Law School in 2002.

== Career ==
From 2007 to 2010, Daschle was the Executive Director of the Democratic Governors Association (DGA), where he managed a $50 million annual budget and a staff of over 20. Over the four-year period he led DGA, the organization set fundraising records and won a majority of its targeted races. Daschle previously served as DGA's Counsel and Director of Policy, and before this, he was a litigation associate at Covington and Burling in Washington, D.C. Daschle has served in the legislative affairs office of the American Federation of State, County, and Municipal Employees and the Natural Resources Defense Council. He also worked on the 1996 U.S. Senate campaign of Tom Strickland in Colorado.

Nathan is on the Board of Directors of the 150PAC, a bipartisan political organization dedicated to promoting American global leadership and The Good Fight, a non-profit dedicated to teaching youth leadership and resilience through boxing.

== Awards ==
Daschle has been recognized by The Hill as a "Top Lobbyist" for several years, including in 2017, 2018, 2019, 2020, and 2021. In September 2021, he was recognized as a Global Top 200 Cannabis Lawyer by Cannabis Law Report.

In October 2010, Daschle was recognized as one of Time magazine's "40 under 40" rising stars in politics. He was also profiled in the September 2010 issue of Details magazine as one of the "16 game-changers in the worlds of entertainment, politics, fashion, and technology" in a piece titled "Mavericks." In July 2006, Nathan was named as one of Washington's "40 Top Lawyers Under 40" by Washingtonian magazine.

== Personal life ==
Daschle has two sons and is married to Jennifer Mormile, CEO of RavenX Ventures.
