= Laurie S. Fulton =

American diplomat (born 1949)

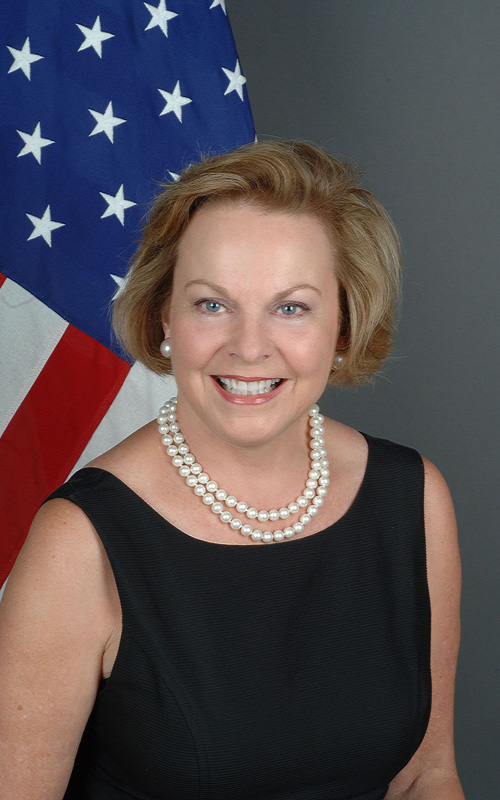

61st United States Ambassador to Denmark
- In office August 3, 2009 – February 15, 2013
- President: Barack Obama
- Preceded by: James P. Cain
- Succeeded by: Rufus Gifford

Personal details
- Born: Laurie Susan Klinkel; July 2, 1949 (age 77) Sioux Falls, South Dakota, U.S.
- Spouse: Tom Daschle (m. 1969; div. 1983)
- Children: 3, including Nathan
- Education: University of Nebraska at Omaha (BA); Georgetown University (JD)

Laurie Susan Fulton (née Klinkel; born July 2, 1949) is an American attorney, diplomat and the former United States Ambassador to Denmark. She was sworn in on July 15, 2009, and presented her credentials to the Queen of Denmark on August 3, 2009. She resigned effective February 15, 2013. In March 2013, she returned to Williams & Connolly LLP until July 2014.

== Early life and education ==
Fulton was born in Sioux Falls, South Dakota. Prior to entering the field of law, Fulton worked in various positions on Capitol Hill.

Fulton earned a B.A. from the University of Nebraska at Omaha and a J.D. from the Georgetown University Law Center from 1986 to 1989, both magna cum laude..

From 1982 to 1985, she was executive director of Peace Links, an organization dedicated to involving mainstream women to end the threat of nuclear war, engage in peace-building and promote alternative means of resolving international conflicts.

Fulton served on the Peace Links Board of Directors from 1989 to 2000. Her work was honored with the Pioneering Peace Builder Award by the National Peace Foundation in 2002.

== Legal career ==
Prior to becoming ambassador and again after resigning as ambassador, Fulton was a partner at the law firm of Williams & Connolly in Washington, D.C., where her law practice included complex civil litigation, government investigations, and white-collar criminal defense.

In 2004, she was named as one of "Washington's Top Lawyers" by Washingtonian, a DC magazine. She is a member of the Bars of the District of Columbia and Virginia, the United States Supreme Court, the United States Court of Appeals for the District of Columbia Circuit, Fourth and Eleventh Circuits and various United States District Courts. Fulton was an active member of the American Bar Association, and the Litigation, Criminal Justice and International Law Sections. She served as co-chair of the Criminal Litigation Committee of the Litigation Section.

== Federal foreign service ==
Fulton has long-standing ties to Denmark. Her maternal grandfather immigrated to the United States from Denmark and served in the United States armed forces in Europe during World War I. Her great-grandfather served in the Danish parliament from 1918 to 1940.

== Other activities ==
Fulton also has been active in community and non-profit organizations. In January 2004, she was confirmed by the United States Senate to serve on the board of directors of the United States Institute of Peace and was co-chair of the USIP International Advisory Council.

== Personal life ==
Fulton was married to future-U.S. Senate Majority Leader Tom Daschle, with whom she had three children, Kelly, Nathan, and Lindsay, before divorcing in 1983. Fulton has five grandchildren.

Diplomatic posts
Preceded by James P. Cain	U.S. Ambassador to Denmark; 2009–2013	Succeeded by Rufus Gifford
