= GovTrack =

Website that tracks U.S. Congress members, bills

GovTrack.us
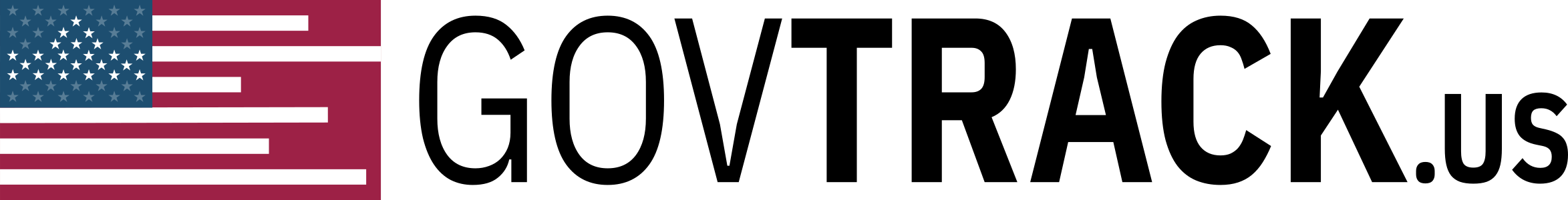
- Website type: Tracking activities of Congress
- Available in: English
- Owners: Civic Impulse, LLC and Joshua Tauberer
- Revenue: For-profit
- Website: www.govtrack.us
- Launched: 2004
- Current status: Active
- Content license: Copyleft

GovTrack.us is a website developed by then-student Joshua Tauberer. It is based in Washington, D.C., and was launched as a hobby. It enables its users to track the bills and members of the United States Congress. Users can add trackers to certain bills, thereby narrowing the scope of the information they receive. The website collects data on members of Congress, allowing users to check members' voting records and attendance relative to their peers. It propagates the ideology of increasing transparency in the government and building better communication between the general public and the government.

== History ==
Tauberer started govtrack.us when he was a student at Princeton University. In 2005, GovTrack was the first to make U.S. federal legislative information comprehensively available in an open, structured data format for researchers, journalists, other public interest projects, and anyone to freely reuse for any purpose. Their data was the basis for dozens of other open government projects, including major projects of the Sunlight Foundation and investigative stories at major news publications, and its data offering continued until 2017, when the U.S. Congress began publishing open, structured data itself.

The website was briefly "on pause" in September 2020 in protest of then-President Donald Trump's refusal to commit to a peaceful transition of power regarding the 2020 U.S. Presidential Election.

== Legislator report cards ==
Since 2004, GovTrack had published specific legislator report cards ranking Senators based who their bill co-sponsors were. Most of the rankings on their cards included more than one year of data, except for 2013, 2015, 2017, and 2019 which only used one year of data. In 2020, GovTrack stopped publishing single-year rankings and only published the more reliable and more statistically-significant multi-year rankings. In July 2024, GovTrack retracted these four single-year report cards.

Republicans had been citing the single-year 2019 ranking that labeled Kamala Harris as the most liberal senator in criticism of her in 2020 and 2024. The two-year rating for 2019 and 2020 combined had her as the most liberal "Democratic senator," with Independent Bernie Sanders as the most liberal senator, which, published in 2021, has also been cited during the 2024 Presidential campaign.

== Reception ==
GovTrack was cited by Clyde Haberman in The New York Times, and was mentioned as striving to help educate voters about legislation by The San Francisco Chronicle. The student wire service University Wire said the site was making it easy for people to learn about the government.

A survey conducted showed that GovTrack helped raise awareness among common citizens through their report card for each legislative year since 2013.

== See also ==
- Elections in the United States
- Politics of the United States
- TheyWorkForYou - British equivalent
