= Mandate for Leadership =

Book series by the Heritage Foundation

Mandate for Leadership is a series of books published by the Heritage Foundation, an American conservative think tank based in Washington, D.C. They offer specific conservative policy recommendations designed to be implemented by the federal government. The books have traditionally been released to coincide with an incoming U.S. presidential administration. The first edition was released in 1981, following the election of Ronald Reagan, to serve as policy guidance for the incoming Reagan administration. The latest edition, published in April 2023, is a major component of Project 2025.

== History ==
In 1979, at a trustees' meeting of the Heritage Foundation, Jack Eckerd, former head of the General Services Administration in the Ford administration, suggested that the foundation draw up a conservative plan of action for the next incoming presidential administration in January 1981. Robert Krieble proposed that Heritage produce a manual to help policymakers "cut the size of government and manage it more effectively".

The first edition was overseen and edited by Charles Heatherly, a former field director of the Intercollegiate Studies Institute. In late January 1980, Heatherly produced a five-page outline titled Mandate for Leadership. Heatherly explained that the purpose of the project was to present concrete proposals to "revitalize our economy, strengthen our national security and halt the centralization of power in the federal government".

Both the Reagan and Carter campaigns were approached by the foundation to discuss the project; however, they only received a reply from the Reagan–Bush campaign. In July 1980, Reagan aide Edwin Meese was a surprise guest at a dinner held by Heritage for the project's team chairmen and co-chairmen. There, Meese gave the Heritage study his blessing, which was seen as a sign of the Reagan administration's receptiveness to the project.

=== Mandate I: Policy Management in a Conservative Administration ===
In January 1981, Mandate for Leadership: Policy Management in a Conservative Administration was released as a 20-volume, 3,000-page publication. Mandate contained more than 2,000 individual suggestions to move the federal government in a conservative direction, focusing on management and administration. The report "presented an explicit plan for reshaping public discourse on civil rights issues". To that end, it recommended the Justice Department "halt its affirmative action policies to remedy past discrimination against women and other minorities."

Specific suggestions related to spending included raising the defense budget by $20 billion in fiscal year 1981 and increasing it by an average of $35 billion over the next five years; establishing urban "enterprise zones" to encourage businesses to move into the nation's inner cities; reducing personal income tax rates by 10 percent across the board; calling for line-item veto power by the president; and developing a new strategic bomber by using B-1 and advanced bomber technology. At the first meeting of his cabinet, President Reagan passed out copies of Mandate, and many of the study's authors were recruited into the White House administration. In particular, the Reagan administration hired key Mandate contributors: William Bennett as chairman of the National Endowment for the Humanities (and later as Secretary of Education) and James G. Watt as Secretary of the Interior.

According to Mandate's authors, around 60% of the 2,000 proposals in it were implemented or initiated at the end of Reagan's first year in office. In a report on the first year of the Reagan administration, the Heritage Foundation expressed disappointment with the government's defense and foreign policy, while it lauded the Office of Management and Budget. Mandate for Leadership appeared on The Washington Post's paperback bestseller list, and the Post called it "an action plan for turning the government toward the right as fast as possible." In 2002, The New York Times called it "the manifesto of the Reagan revolution".

=== Mandate II: Continuing the Conservative Revolution ===
In 1984, Heritage released Mandate for Leadership II: Continuing the Conservative Revolution. The study featured 1,300 recommendations from 150 contributors, and continued the original Mandate's aim of reforming the federal government and strengthening U.S. defenses.

=== Mandate III: Policy Strategies for the 1990s ===
Heritage published its third manual for an incoming administration in 1988, titled Mandate for Leadership III: Policy Strategies for the 1990s. This edition was edited by Charles Heatherly and Burt Pines.

=== Mandate IV: Turning Ideas into Action ===
Prior to the 1996 U.S. presidential election, Heritage published the fourth Mandate for Leadership edition. Mandate for Leadership IV: Turning Ideas into Action was aimed at Congress, and focused on presenting a political strategy for Congress to continue the conservative policies of the outgoing Republican presidential administration. This edition of Mandate was offered as study material at an orientation conference attended by both Democratic and Republican freshman congressmen held by The Heritage Foundation and Empower America. In particular, a chapter on moving an agenda through Congress was recommended by Senate Majority Leader Trent Lott to House Speaker Newt Gingrich.

=== Mandate V: Mandate for Leadership 2000 ===
The fifth edition in the Mandate series, Mandate for Leadership 2000, included the edited transcripts of nine nonpartisan public sessions held by Heritage in 2000 called "The Keys to a Successful Presidency". The forums focused on how past presidents and administrations implemented their policy agendas from their first day in office. Participants included Leon Panetta, former chief of staff to President Clinton; Martin Anderson, who advised President Reagan on domestic policy; Zbigniew Brzezinski, national security adviser to President Carter; and columnist Robert Novak. Historian and former congressional aide, Alvin S. Felzenberg was Mandate for Leadership 2000's project director.

=== Mandate VI: Principles to Limit Government, Expand Freedom, and Strengthen America ===
In 2005, Heritage published the sixth edition, Mandate for Leadership: Principles to Limit Government, Expand Freedom, and Strengthen America. This edition of Mandate was just 156 pages long. According to Heritage, the shorter length reflected that policies and ideas from the early Mandate editions had, by the time of this publication, largely become part of the mainstream debate.

=== Mandate VII: Blueprint for Reform ===
The seventh edition, Mandate for Leadership: Blueprint for Reform, was published in November 2016, shortly after the 2016 U.S. presidential election won by Donald Trump. This edition was longer than prior editions, published in three volumes, (Note: Part I, Blueprint for Balance: A Federal Budget for 2017; Part II, Blueprint for Reform: A Comprehensive Policy Agenda for a New Administration in 2017; and Part III, Blueprint for a New Administration: Priorities for the President.) in part because much of the progress of the foundation's public policy agenda had been lost during the presidency of Barack Obama. In 2018, Heritage claimed the Trump administration had by then embraced 64%, or nearly 2/3rds, of 334 proposed policies in the foundation's Mandate for Leadership.

=== Mandate VIII: Mandate 2020: Clear Vision for the Next Administration ===
The eighth edition, Mandate 2020: Clear Vision for the Next Administration, was published in July 2020. A companion document, Solutions 2020, was also released.

=== Mandate IX: Mandate for Leadership 2025: The Conservative Promise (Project 2025) ===
The ninth edition in the Mandate series, Mandate for Leadership 2025: The Conservative Promise, was published in April 2023 prior to the 2024 U.S. presidential election. The ninth edition includes 30 chapters and is over 900 pages in length. This document provides the policy agenda for Project 2025.
