= Democratic Governors Association =

Organization of U.S. Democratic governors

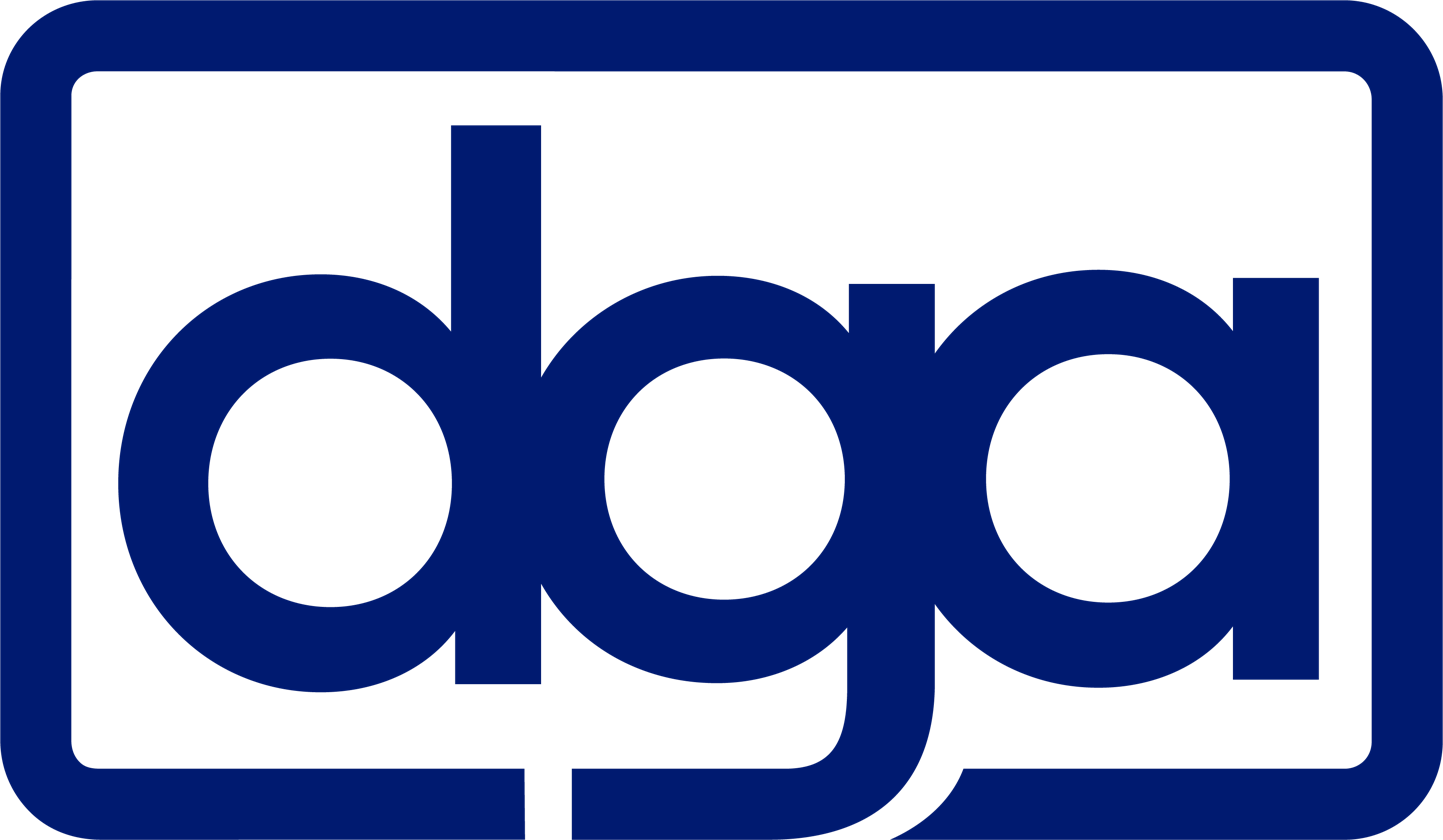
- Chair: Andy Beshear (KY)
- Vice Chair: Gretchen Whitmer (MI)
- Policy Chair: Gavin Newsom (CA)
- Finance Chair: Tim Walz (MN)
- Founded: 1965 (Democratic Governors Conference); 1983 (Democratic Governors Association)
- Headquarters: 1225 Eye St NW; Ste 1100; Washington, D.C., 20005; United States
- Affiliated: Democratic Party
- State governors: 24 / 50
- Territorial governors: 2 / 5
- Federal district mayorship: 1 / 1

Website
- democraticgovernors.org

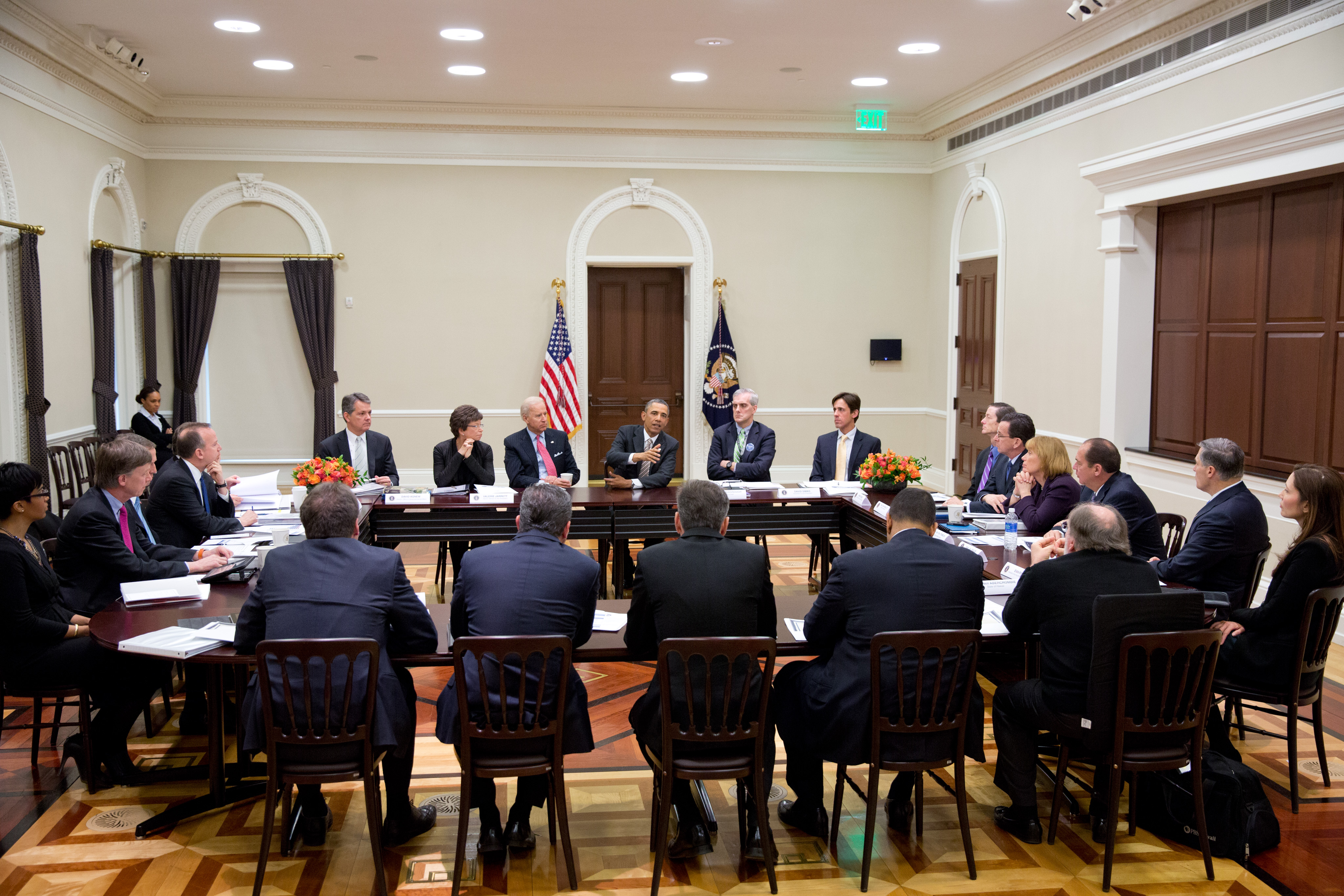
United States President Barack Obama and Vice President Joe Biden meet with the Democratic Governors Association in the Eisenhower Executive Office Building on 22 February 2013.

The Democratic Governors Association (DGA) is a Washington, D.C.–based 527 organization founded in 1983, consisting of U.S. state and territorial governors affiliated with the Democratic Party. The main purpose of the organization is to provide party support to the election and re-election of Democratic gubernatorial candidates. The DGA's Republican counterpart is the Republican Governors Association. The DGA is not directly affiliated with the non-partisan National Governors Association.

Meghan Meehan-Draper is currently the DGA's executive director, and Governor of Kentucky Andy Beshear is the current chair.

== History ==
Previously known as the Democratic Governors Conference within the Democratic National Committee, DGA became an independent institution in 1983 under the leadership of then-Virginia governor Chuck Robb with the help of then-Democratic National Committee chair Charles Manatt. The purpose of the committee was to raise funds to elect Democrats to governorships and to improve the partnership between Democratic governors and the Democratic leadership of the U.S. Congress. Prior to its current formation in mid-1983, they met as the Democratic Governors Conference.

The DGA played a pivotal role in the election of Arkansas governor Bill Clinton to the presidency in 1992. Under the leadership of DGA chair and Hawaii governor John Waiheʻe, the DGA helped organize Clinton's "winning the West" campaign tour through Colorado, Wyoming, Montana, Washington, Oregon, Nevada and California. Republicans had handily won all of those states except Washington and Oregon the previous three elections. According to The Washington Post, it was "all but unthinkable to Republicans that the GOP could lose such stalwart pieces of the party's electoral base as Wyoming and Nevada." Clinton lost Wyoming but carried Nevada, Colorado, Montana, Washington, Oregon, and California.

== Leadership ==
The DGA is led by two elected Democratic governors.

| Office | Officer | State | Since |
|---|---|---|---|
| Chair | Andy Beshear | Kentucky | 2025 |
| Vice Chair | Gretchen Whitmer | Michigan | 2025 |

== List of current Democratic governors ==
There are currently 24 Democratic governors.

| Current governor | State | Past | Took office | Current term |
|---|---|---|---|---|
| Katie Hobbs | Arizona | List | 2023 | First term |
| Gavin Newsom | California | List | 2019 | Second term (term-limited in 2026) |
| Jared Polis | Colorado | List | 2019 | Second term (term-limited in 2026) |
| Ned Lamont | Connecticut | List | 2019 | Second term |
| Matt Meyer | Delaware | List | 2025 | First term |
| Josh Green | Hawaii | List | 2022 | First term |
| J. B. Pritzker | Illinois | List | 2019 | Second term |
| Laura Kelly | Kansas | List | 2019 | Second term (term-limited in 2026) |
| Andy Beshear | Kentucky | List | 2019 | Second term (term-limited in 2027) |
| Janet Mills | Maine | List | 2019 | Second term (term-limited in 2026) |
| Wes Moore | Maryland | List | 2023 | First term |
| Maura Healey | Massachusetts | List | 2023 | First term |
| Gretchen Whitmer | Michigan | List | 2019 | Second term (term-limited in 2026) |
| Tim Walz | Minnesota | List | 2019 | Second term (retiring in 2026) |
| Mikie Sherrill | New Jersey | List | 2026 | First term |
| Michelle Lujan Grisham | New Mexico | List | 2019 | Second term (term-limited in 2026) |
| Kathy Hochul | (New York (state)) New York | List | 2021 (succeeded) | First full term |
| Josh Stein | North Carolina | List | 2025 | First term |
| Tina Kotek | Oregon | List | 2023 | First term |
| Josh Shapiro | Pennsylvania | List | 2023 | First term |
| Dan McKee | Rhode Island | List | 2021 (succeeded) | First full term |
| Abigail Spanberger | Virginia | List | 2026 | First term (term-limited in 2029) |
| Bob Ferguson | (Washington (state)) Washington | List | 2025 | First term |
| Tony Evers | Wisconsin | List | 2019 | Second term (retiring in 2026) |

In addition to governors of U.S. states, the DGA also offers membership to Democratic governors of U.S. territories.

| Current governor | Territory | Past | Took office | Current term |
|---|---|---|---|---|
| Lou Leon Guerrero | Guam | List | 2019 | Second term (term-limited in 2026) |
| Albert Bryan | (United States Virgin Islands) U.S. Virgin Islands | List | 2019 | Second term (term-limited in 2026) |

In addition, the DGA offers membership to the mayor of the District of Columbia.

| Current mayor | Federal district | Past | Took office | Current term |
|---|---|---|---|---|
| Muriel Bowser | (Washington, D.C.) District of Columbia | List | 2015 | Third term |

== List of DGA chairs ==
| Election cycle(s) | Chair | State |
|---|---|---|
| 1965 | John Connally | Texas |
| 1966–1967 | Harold Hughes | Iowa |
| 1968 | Robert Evander McNair | South Carolina |
| 1969 | John N. Dempsey | Connecticut |
| 1970 | Robert W. Scott | North Carolina |
| 1971 | Marvin Mandel | Maryland |
| 1972 | Dale Bumpers | Arkansas |
| 1973 | Wendell Ford | Kentucky |
| 1974 | Wendell R. Anderson | Minnesota |
| 1975 | Philip W. Noel | Rhode Island |
| 1976 | Reubin Askew | Florida |
| 1977 | Patrick Lucey | Wisconsin |
| 1977 | Unknown | Unknown |
| 1978 | Jim Hunt | North Carolina |
| 1979 | Ella Grasso | Connecticut |
| 1980 | Brendan Byrne | New Jersey |
| 1981 | Jerry Brown | California |
| 1982 | John Y. Brown Jr. | Kentucky |
| 1983 | Scott M. Matheson | Utah |
| 1984 | Chuck Robb | Virginia |
| 1985 | Bruce Babbitt | Arizona |
| 1986 | Richard Riley | South Carolina |
| 1987 | Michael Dukakis | Massachusetts |
| 1988 | Bill Clinton | Arkansas |
| 1989 | James Blanchard | Michigan |
| 1990 | Dick Celeste | Ohio |
| 1991 | Roy Romer | Colorado |
| 1992 | John D. Waihee III | Hawaii |
| 1993 | David Walters | Oklahoma |
| 1994 | Evan Bayh | Indiana |
| 1995 | Mel Carnahan | Missouri |
| 1996 | Gaston Caperton | West Virginia |
| 1997 | Howard Dean | Vermont |
| 1998 | Pedro Rosselló | Puerto Rico |
| 1999 | Frank O'Bannon | Indiana |
| 2000 | Paul E. Patton | Kentucky |
| 2001 | Gray Davis | California |
| 2002 | Parris Glendening | Maryland |
| 2003 | Gary Locke | (Washington (state)) Washington |
| 2004 | Tom Vilsack | Iowa |
| 2005–2006 | Bill Richardson | New Mexico |
| 2007 | Kathleen Sebelius | Kansas |
| 2008 | Joe Manchin | West Virginia |
| 2009 | Brian Schweitzer | Montana |
| 2010 | Jack Markell | Delaware |
| 2011–2012 | Martin O'Malley | Maryland |
| 2013–2014 | Peter Shumlin | Vermont |
| 2015 | Steve Bullock | Montana |
| 2016–2017 | Dannel Malloy | Connecticut |
| 2018 | Jay Inslee | (Washington (state)) Washington |
| 2019 | Gina Raimondo | Rhode Island |
| 2020 | Phil Murphy | New Jersey |
| 2021 | Michelle Lujan Grisham | New Mexico |
| 2022 | Roy Cooper | North Carolina |
| 2023 | Phil Murphy | New Jersey |
| 2024 | Tim Walz | Minnesota |
| 2024–2025 | Laura Kelly | Kansas |
| 2025–present | Andy Beshear | Kentucky |

=== Executive directors ===
| Term | Director |
|---|---|
| 1983–1989 | Chuck Dolan |
| 1990–1992 | Mark Gearan |
| 1993–1998 | Katie Whelan |
| 1999–2004 | BJ Thornberry |
| 2005–2006 | Penny Lee |
| 2007–2010 | Nathan Daschle |
| 2011–2014 | Colm O'Comartun |
| 2015–2018 | Elisabeth Pearson |
| 2018–2022 | Noam Lee |
| 2022–present | Meghan Meehan-Draper |

== Other offices ==
Democratic governors have served in various other government positions after their tenure. The following list includes recent positions from the DGA's formalization in 1983.

Democratic governors elected as President:

- Jimmy Carter of Georgia, 1977–1981
- Bill Clinton of Arkansas, 1993–2001

Democratic governors appointed to the U.S. Cabinet:

- Reubin Askew of Florida: Trade Representative, 1979–1980 (Carter)
- Bruce Babbitt of Arizona: Secretary of the Interior, 1993–2001 (Clinton)
- Richard Riley of South Carolina: Secretary of Education, 1993–2001 (Clinton)
- Andrew Cuomo of New York (served prior to governorship): Secretary of Housing and Urban Development, 1997–2001 (Clinton)
- Bill Richardson of New Mexico (served prior to governorship): Ambassador to the United Nations, 1997–1998 and Secretary of Energy, 1998–2001 (Clinton)
- Gary Locke of Washington: Secretary of Commerce, 2009–2011 (Obama)
- Ray Mabus of Mississippi: Secretary of the Navy, 2009–2017 (Obama)
- Janet Napolitano of Arizona: Secretary of Homeland Security, 2009–2013 (Obama)
- Kathleen Sebelius of Kansas: Secretary of Health and Human Services, 2009–2014 (Obama)
- Tom Vilsack of Iowa: Secretary of Agriculture, 2009–2017 (Obama) and 2021– 2025 (Biden)
- Jennifer Granholm of Michigan: Secretary of Energy, 2021– 2025 (Biden)
- Gina Raimondo of Rhode Island: Secretary of Commerce, 2021–2025 (Biden)

Democratic governors appointed to ambassadorships:

- James Blanchard of Michigan: Ambassador to Canada, 1993–1996 (Clinton)
- Ray Mabus of Mississippi: Ambassador to Saudi Arabia, 1994–1996 (Clinton)
- Dick Celeste of Ohio: Ambassador to India, 1997–2001 (Clinton)
- Mike Sullivan of Wyoming: Ambassador to Ireland, 1998–2001 (Clinton)
- Gary Locke of Washington: Ambassador to China, 2011–2014 (Obama)
- Phil Murphy of New Jersey (served prior to governorship): Ambassador to Germany, 2009–2013 (Obama)
- Jack Markell of Delaware: Ambassador to the OECD, 2022–2023 and Ambassador to Italy, 2023– 2025 (Biden)

Democratic governors elected as chair of the Democratic National Committee:

- Roy Romer of Colorado, 1997–1999
- Howard Dean of Vermont, 2005–2009
- Tim Kaine of Virginia, 2009–2011

Democratic governors elected to the U.S. Senate:

- Clyde R. Hoey of North Carolina, 1945–1954
- J. Melville Broughton of North Carolina, 1948–1949
- W. Kerr Scott of North Carolina, 1954–1958
- Fritz Hollings of South Carolina, 1966–2005
- Dale Bumpers of Arkansas, 1975–1999
- Wendell Ford of Kentucky, 1974–1999
- David Boren of Oklahoma, 1979–1994
- J. James Exon of Nebraska, 1979–1997
- David Pryor of Arkansas, 1979–1997
- Jay Rockefeller of West Virginia, 1985–2015
- Terry Sanford of North Carolina, 1986–1993
- Bob Graham of Florida, 1987–2005
- Bob Kerrey of Nebraska, 1989–2001
- Chuck Robb of Virginia, 1989–2001
- Evan Bayh of Indiana, 1999–2011
- Zell Miller of Georgia, 2000–2005
- Tom Carper of Delaware, 2001–2025
- Mark Dayton of Minnesota (served prior to governorship), 2001–2007
- Jon Corzine of New Jersey (served prior to governorship), 2001–2006
- Ben Nelson of Nebraska, 2001–2013
- Jeanne Shaheen of New Hampshire, 2009–present
- Mark Warner of Virginia, 2009–present
- Joe Manchin of West Virginia, 2010–2025
- Tim Kaine of Virginia, 2013–present
- Maggie Hassan of New Hampshire, 2017–present
- John Hickenlooper of Colorado, 2021–present

== Fundraising ==
The DGA reported raising over $20 million in 2011, almost doubling what it raised during the comparable 2007 election cycle. "Because of our strong efforts in 2011, we will have the resources to aid Democratic candidates in targeted states and continue to fight for our core priorities: Jobs. Opportunity. Now.," DGA Chair Martin O'Malley said. Executive Director Colm O'Comartun added, "There is no doubt that we will face a challenging electoral environment in 2012, but our victories in 2011 showed that we know how to wisely and strategically deploy our resources. We are delighted with the continued support of everyone who believes in our mission of creating jobs and expanding opportunity now."

== Notable staff alumni ==
Several former DGA staff members have gone on to hold prominent positions in the government and in the private and non-profit sectors.

Former communications director Jake Siewert served as press secretary for President Bill Clinton for four months from 2000 to 2001. From 2001 to 2009, he worked for Alcoa Inc. In 2009, he became an advisor to then-Treasury Secretary Timothy Geithner.

Former policy director Sheryl Rose Parker was director of intergovernmental affairs for U.S. House speaker Nancy Pelosi. She is currently deputy director of government affairs for the Bill and Melinda Gates Foundation.

Former policy communications director Doug Richardson served as director of public affairs at the White House Office of National Drug Control Policy in the Obama administration. He is currently public relations director for R&R Partners.

Former executive director Katie Whelan served as a senior advisor to Republican California governor Arnold Schwarzenegger. She was an Institute of Politics Fellow at Harvard's John F. Kennedy School of Government. She is currently senior public policy advisor for Patton Boggs LLP.

Former executive director Nathan Daschle is the founder and CEO of Ruckus, Inc., an online political engagement platform. He is the son of former U.S. senator Tom Daschle. In October 2010, Daschle was recognized as one of Time magazine's "40 under 40" rising stars in politics.

Former executive director Mark Gearan was director of communications during the Clinton administration and served as director of the Peace Corps. He served as president of Hobart and William Smith Colleges in Geneva, New York from 1999 to 2017.

Founding executive director Chuck Dolan is a senior vice president at kglobal and was appointed by President Clinton as vice-chair of the Advisory Commission on Public Diplomacy. He is a lecturer at the George Washington University School of Media and Public Affairs.
