= James Abdnor =

American politician (1923–2012)

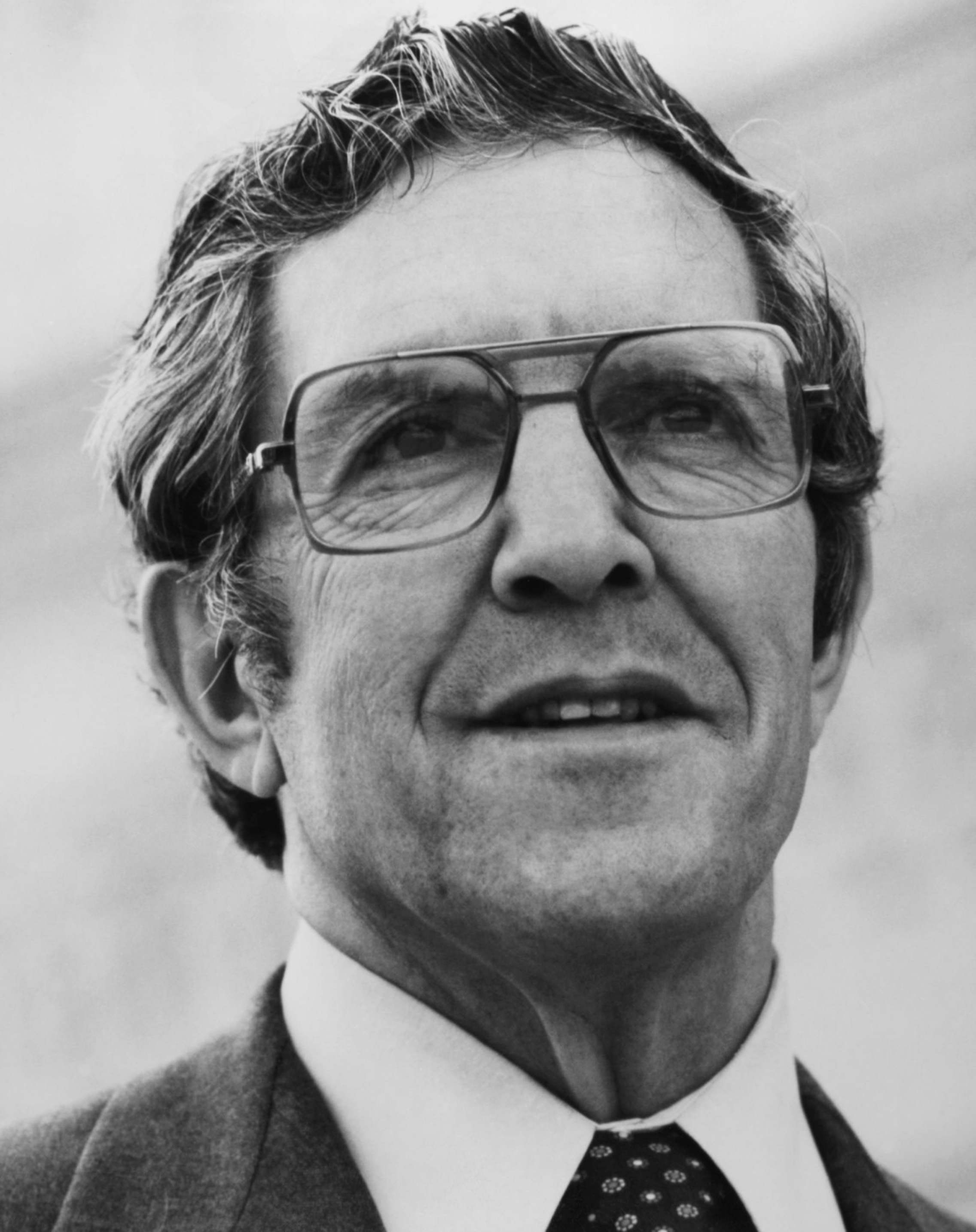
- Official portrait, 1983

15th Administrator of the Small Business Administration
- In office March 12, 1987 – April 18, 1989
- President: Ronald Reagan; George H. W. Bush
- Preceded by: James C. Sanders
- Succeeded by: Susan Engeleiter

United States Senator from South Dakota
- In office January 3, 1981 – January 3, 1987
- Preceded by: George McGovern
- Succeeded by: Tom Daschle

Member of the U.S. House of Representatives from South Dakota's 2nd district
- In office January 3, 1973 – January 3, 1981
- Preceded by: James Abourezk
- Succeeded by: Clint Roberts

30th Lieutenant Governor of South Dakota
- In office January 7, 1969 – January 5, 1971
- Governor: Frank Farrar
- Preceded by: Lem Overpeck
- Succeeded by: William Dougherty

Member of the South Dakota Senate
- In office 1957–1969

Personal details
- Born: Ellis James Abdnor; February 13, 1923 Kennebec, South Dakota, U.S
- Died: May 16, 2012 (aged 89) Sioux Falls, South Dakota, U.S
- Party: Republican
- Education: University of Nebraska (BA)

Military service
- Allegiance: United States
- Branch/service: United States Army
- Battles/wars: World War II

Ellis James Abdnor (February 13, 1923 – May 16, 2012) was an American politician who served as a member of the United States Senate from South Dakota. He was also the 15th administrator of the Small Business Administration under presidents Ronald Reagan and George H. W. Bush.

Abdnor had previously represented South Dakota's 2nd congressional district in the United States House of Representatives and served as the 30th Lieutenant Governor of South Dakota and a member of the South Dakota Senate.

== Early life and education ==
Abdnor was born in Kennebec, South Dakota, on February 13, 1923, the son of Lebanese parents Mary (née Wehby) and Samuel Joseph Abdnor. Abdnor served in the United States Army during World War II and then graduated from the University of Nebraska in 1945 where he became a member of the Sigma Chi fraternity.

== Career ==
From 1946 to 1948, James Abdnor worked as a teacher and coach. Abdnor was chief clerk of the South Dakota Legislature in the early-1950s.

He was a member of the South Dakota Senate from 1957 to 1969. A common, decent, plain spoken man, he was affectionately known as "the people's Senator." He was also described as a "nice-guy public servant" with a "down-home, warm and fuzzy way. His staff considered him to be a friend as well as an honorable mentor and public servant. Like his South Dakota congressional colleague James Abourezk, he was a second-generation Lebanese American and second U.S. Senator of Lebanese descent after Abourezk, as well.

Abdnor was the 30th Lieutenant Governor of South Dakota from 1969 to 1971, and unsuccessfully sought the nomination for the House of Representatives in 1970.

== Tenure in Congress ==
In 1972, he was elected to the United States House of Representatives as a Republican.

Abdnor ran in 1980 against three-term incumbent and 1972 Democratic presidential nominee George McGovern for the United States Senate. Abdnor claimed McGovern was out of touch with the state and unseated him by a large margin. During his term as a senator, Abdnor served on the Appropriations Committee and Environment and Public Works Committee, and chaired three subcommittees, including the Environment and Public Works Water Resources Subcommittee.

In 1986, after winning by a wide margin a bruising re-election primary campaign against then Governor Bill Janklow, Abdnor narrowly lost his Senate seat to then-Representative Tom Daschle. He served as the administrator of the Small Business Administration from 1987 to 1989, and served in an advisory capacity for John Thune's successful campaign against Daschle in 2004.

=== Legislation ===
Abdnor's accomplishments included authorization of the Grassropes irrigation project and the Walworth, Edmunds, Brown (WEB) rural water system, reauthorization of the Belle Fourche irrigation project, and the inclusion of oats (of which South Dakota is a major producer) in the farm program.

As a fiscal conservative, on April 2, 1984, he introduced S. 2516, the Deficit Reduction Act, a forerunner to the Gramm–Rudman–Hollings Balanced Budget Act. As chair of the Senate Environment and Public Works Subcommittee on Water Resources, he exerted leadership in passage of legislation requiring cost-sharing for Federal water development projects. His interest in chairing the subcommittee was spawned by the importance of water to South Dakota's primary industry, agriculture, and the fact the state had been promised irrigation development in trade for inundation of its Missouri River bottom land behind massive dams in order to provide flood control and navigation benefits to downstream states.

=== Notable Abdnor staffers ===
United States Senator John Thune had been a member of Senator Abdnor's staff.

Other notable members of Abdnor's staff who went on to fill important public service roles include:John Hamre, Undersecretary of Defense; Jeff Trandahl, Clerk of the House; Bruce Knight, Undersecretary, Marketing and Regulatory Programs, U.S. Department of Agriculture (USDA); Larry Parkinson, Deputy Assistant Secretary for Law Enforcement and Security, U.S. Department of the Interior (DOI) and Director, Office of Enforcement, Federal Energy Regulatory Commission (FERC); Phil Hogen, Chairman of the National Indian Gaming Commission (NIGC); Vern Larson, South Dakota State Treasurer and Auditor; South Dakota State Senators Walter Conahan, Mike Vehle, Lee Schoenbeck and Scott Heidepriem; South Dakota State Representative Sean O'Brien; Charlotte Fischer, South Dakota Public Utilities Commissioner; Roland Dolly, Commissioner of Economic Development for the State Of South Dakota; and Stephen Censky, Administrator of the Foreign Agricultural Service, CEO of the American Soybean Association, and United States Deputy Secretary of Agriculture.

== Death ==
Abdnor died on May 16, 2012, at the age of 89.

== See also ==
- List of Arab and Middle-Eastern Americans in the United States Congress

Political offices
Preceded by Lem Overpeck	Lieutenant Governor of South Dakota; 1969–1971	Succeeded by William Dougherty
Preceded by Charles Heatherly; Acting	Administrator of the Small Business Administration; 1987–1989	Succeeded by Susan Engeleiter
U.S. House of Representatives
Preceded by James Abourezk	Member of the U.S. House of Representatives from South Dakota's 2nd congressional district 1973–1981	Succeeded by Clint Roberts
Party political offices
Preceded by Lem Overpeck	Republican nominee for Lieutenant Governor of South Dakota; 1968	Succeeded by Neal Strand
Preceded by Leo K. Thorsness	Republican nominee for U.S. Senator from South Dakota (Class 3); 1980, 1986	Succeeded by Charlene Haar
U.S. Senate
Preceded by George McGovern	U.S. Senator (Class 3) from South Dakota; 1981–1987; Served alongside: Larry Pressler	Succeeded by Tom Daschle
