= Joshua Tauberer =

American activist

- Education: Princeton University (BA); University of Pennsylvania (PhD)
- Occupations: Civic hacker Software developer Technical advisor
- Notable work: Mail-in-a-Box
- Website: razor.occams.info www.govtrack.us mailinabox.email

Joshua Tauberer is a civic hacker, open government activist, entrepreneur, and author. He is the creator and maintainer of the website GovTrack, a portal for information about legislation in Congress, and developer for EveryCRSReport.com, which makes Congressional Research Service Reports available to the public. Tauberer is also the lead developer for Mail-in-a-Box, an Open Source software project for mail server hosting.

== Early life ==
Tauberer attended Plainview-Old Bethpage John F. Kennedy High School in Plainview, New York, before going on to earn a Bachelor of Arts in psychology from Princeton University in 2004. After Princeton, he earned a Doctorate in Linguistics from the University of Pennsylvania.

== GovTrack ==
Tauberer created GovTrack in 2004 to make legislative information more easily accessible to everyone, providing research and tracking tools but also raw data feeds that third parties use to create other services. He conceived the idea for GovTrack during his freshman year at Princeton. The utility of the data that Tauberer made available on his site (and later became available on other sites) was part of the inspiration for Congressman Mike Honda's legislation to provide new sources of legislative data; Congress is now publishing legislative information as data.

== Policy and activism ==
Tauberer has occasionally used these technical tools and others to advise policy, including publication of uses of GovTrack by Congressional IP addresses and FOIA requests regarding the DC government's open data administration.

== Career ==
Tauberer is the president of Civic Impulse, LLC, a consultant to GovReady PBC, and a senior technologist at LARSA, Inc.

He serves as a member of the D.C. government's Open Government Advisory Group and the Congressional Data Coalition, is the author of Open Government Data: the Book, and co-organized the now defunct yearly Open Data Day DC conference. Among his notable writings are "So You Want to Reform Democracy" and "How to Run a Successful Hackathon."
