= Charles Heatherly =

American bureaucrat

Charles L. Heatherly
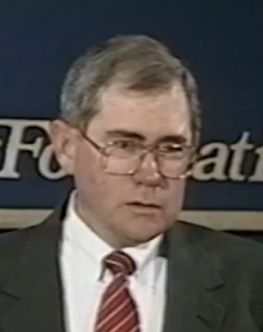
- Heatherly speaking at the Heritage Foundation in 1990

15th Administrator of the Small Business Administration
- Acting
- In office March 31, 1986 – March 23, 1987
- President: Ronald Reagan
- Preceded by: James C. Sanders
- Succeeded by: James Abdnor

Director of the President's Commission on White House Fellowships
- Former
- Assumed office April 1, 1984
- President: Ronald Reagan
- Preceded by: James C. Roberts
- Succeeded by: Linda L. Tarr

Deputy Under Secretary for Management in the U.S. Department of Education
- Former
- Assumed office September 3, 1982
- President: Ronald Reagan
- Preceded by: Kent Lloyd
- Succeeded by: Linda M. Combs

Personal details
- Born: June 6, 1942 Elizabethton, Tennessee, U.S.
- Party: Republican
- Nickname: Angel of Death

Charles L. Heatherly (born June 6, 1942) is an American bureaucrat who was the acting administrator of the U.S. Small Business Administration from 1986 to 1987 following the resignation of James C. Sanders.

== Early life and education ==
Heatherly attended the University of Arizona, where he became involved in Barry Goldwater's 1964 presidential campaign. After graduating, Heatherly became an organizer for the Intercollegiate Studies Institute. In 1975, Heatherly received a master's degree from Claremont Graduate School and University Center.

== Career ==
=== The Heritage Foundation ===
Heatherly joined the Heritage Foundation, where, in 1981, he helped author and edit Mandate for Leadership, which offered policy recommendations to the incoming Reagan administration. Subsequent versions of Mandate have since been published by the foundation.

=== Small Business Administration ===
Heatherly's tenure was characterized by his efforts in attempting to carry out the Reagan Administration's plan to merge the independent SBA into the U.S. Department of Commerce. The plan was ultimately dropped due to a lack of support from Congress and intense criticism from the small business community. Heatherly conceded that the decision to merge the SBA with the Department of Commerce had "nothing to do with budget savings" and soon shifted his efforts to examining the effectiveness of the SBA's loan guarantee and educational programs.

==== Criticism ====
Heatherly's ascension as SBA administrator drew bipartisan ire from Senators Lowell Weicker (R-CT) and Dale Bumpers (D-AR), who both took issue with Heatherly's appointment, which was never considered by the Senate Small Business Committee.

Senator Weicker sent a letter to the U.S. Government Accountability Office (GAO) requesting that they examine a pamphlet published by the SBA at Heatherly's direction, titled The Future of SBA. While the GAO determined that the pamphlet did not violate the law, the office stated that they had "serious difficulties" with the SBA's distribution of its accompanying "suggested editorials" supporting the Reagan administration's reorganization plan for the SBA. The GAO stated that the suggested editorials were "misleading as to their origin and reasonably constitute[d] 'propaganda...'"

Following pressure from small business delegates to the 1986 White House Conference on Small Business, President Ronald Reagan announced that Heatherly would be replaced as the SBA's acting head.

=== Return to Heritage Foundation ===
Following his ouster from the SBA, Heatherly returned to the Heritage Foundation as the organization's vice president for academic relations.

== Published works ==
=== Books ===
- Heritage Foundation (1981). Heatherly, Charles (ed.). Mandate for Leadership I. Washington, D.C.: Heritage Foundation. ISBN 0891950281.
- Heritage Foundation (1989). Heatherly, Charles; Pines, Burt (eds.). Mandate for Leadership III: Policy Strategies for the 1990s. Washington, D.C.: Heritage Foundation. ISBN 089195046X.
- Lundberg, Kevin (September 11, 2020). Heatherly, Charles (ed.). UNMASKED2020: Colorado's Radical Left Turn and a Warning to America. Republican Study Committee of Colorado. ISBN 978-0578748016.
