= 1980 United States Senate election in South Dakota =

- November 4, 1980
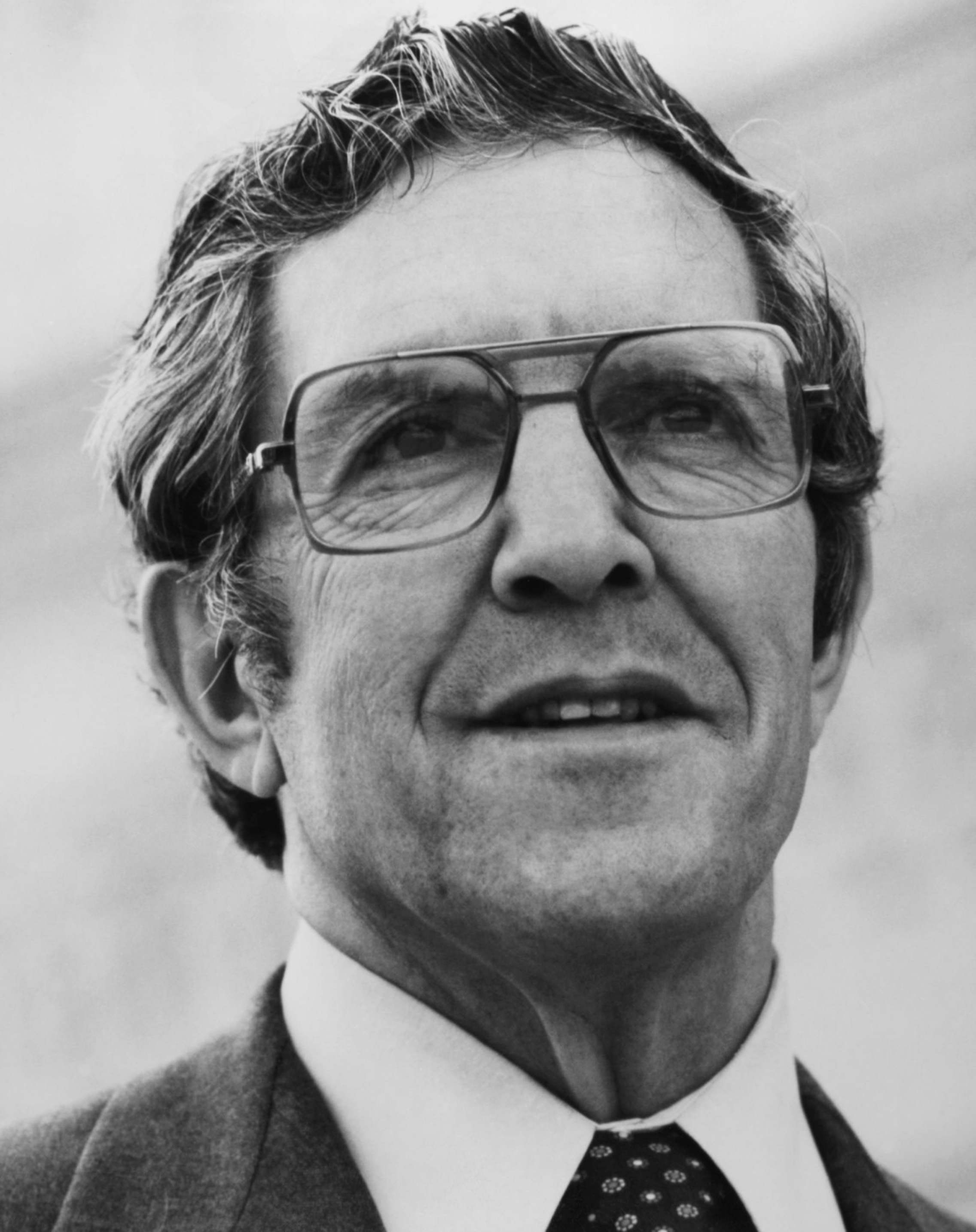

Nominee	James Abdnor	George McGovern
Party	Republican	Democratic
Popular vote	190,594	129,018
Percentage	58.20%	39.40%
- County results Abdnor: 40–50% 50–60% 60–70% 70–80% 80–90% McGovern: 50–60% 60–70% 70–80%
U.S. senator before election
George McGovern
Democratic
Elected U.S. Senator
James Abdnor
Republican

The 1980 United States Senate election in South Dakota was held on Tuesday November 4, 1980. Incumbent Democratic U.S. Senator George McGovern ran for re-election to a fourth term, but was defeated by Republican James Abdnor.

== Democratic primary ==
=== Candidates ===
- George McGovern, incumbent U.S. senator
- Larry Schumaker, educator and pro-life activist

=== Results ===
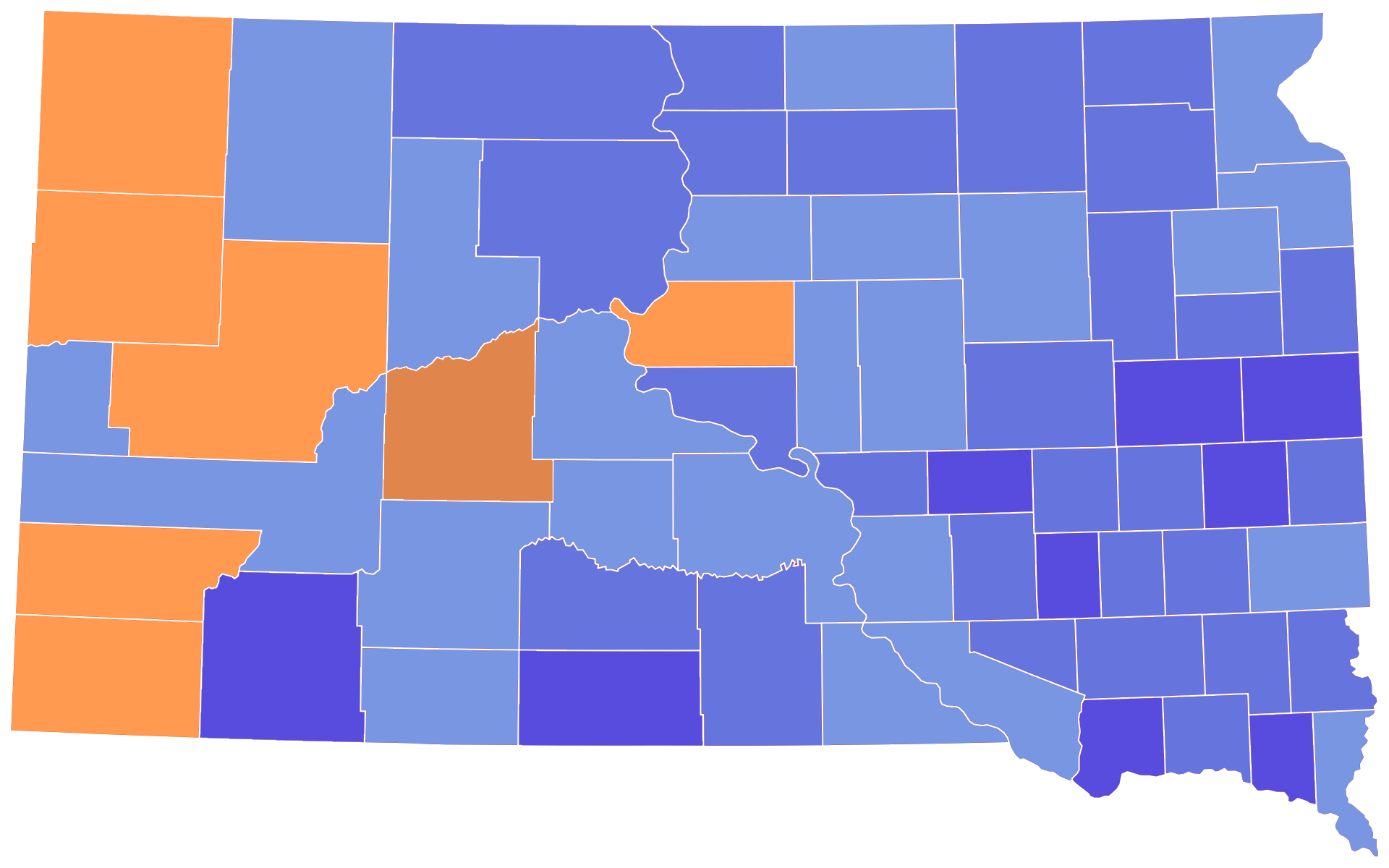
Results by county: McGovern: 50–60%; 60–70%; 70–80%; Schumaker: 50–60%; 60–70%

Democratic primary results
Party	Candidate	Votes	%
Democratic	George McGovern (incumbent)	44,822	62.44%
Democratic	Larry Schumaker	26,958	37.56%
Total votes		71,780	100.00%

== Republican primary ==
=== Candidates ===
- James Abdnor, U.S. representative
- Dale Bell

=== Results ===
Republican primary results
Party	Candidate	Votes	%
Republican	James Abdnor	68,196	72.93%
Republican	Dale Bell	25,314	27.07%
Total votes		93,510	100.00%

== General election ==
=== Candidates ===
- James Abdnor (R), U.S. representative
- George McGovern (D), incumbent U.S. senator

=== Campaign ===
McGovern was one of several liberal Democratic U.S. senators targeted for defeat in 1980 by the National Conservative Political Action Committee (NCPAC), which put out a year's worth of negative portrayals of McGovern. They and other anti-abortion groups especially focused on McGovern's support for pro-choice abortion laws. McGovern faced a Democratic primary challenge for the first time, from an anti-abortion candidate.

Abdnor, a four-term incumbent congressman who held identical positions to McGovern on farm issues, was solidly conservative on national issues, and was well liked within the state. Abdnor's campaign focused on both McGovern's liberal voting record and what it said was McGovern's lack of involvement in South Dakotan affairs. McGovern made an issue of NCPAC's outside involvement, and that group eventually withdrew from the campaign after Abdnor denounced a letter they had sent out. Far behind in the polls earlier, McGovern outspent Abdnor 2-to-1, hammered away at Abdnor's refusal to debate him (drawing attention to a slight speech defect Abdnor had), and, showing the comeback pattern of some of his past races in the state, closed the gap for a while.

However, McGovern was solidly defeated in the general election, receiving only 39 percent of the vote to Abdnor's 58 percent. McGovern became one of many Democratic casualties in that year's Republican sweep, which became known as the "Reagan Revolution". McGovern was one of nine incumbent senators to lose a general election that year.

=== Results ===
General election results
Party	Candidate	Votes	%	±%
Republican	James Abdnor	190,594	58.20%	+11.24%
Democratic	George McGovern (incumbent)	129,018	39.40%	−13.65%
Independent	Wayne Peterson	7,866	2.40%	N/A
Total votes		327,478	100.00%	N/A
Republican gain from Democratic				

== See also ==
- 1980 United States Senate elections
