= Tom Daschle =

American politician (born 1947)

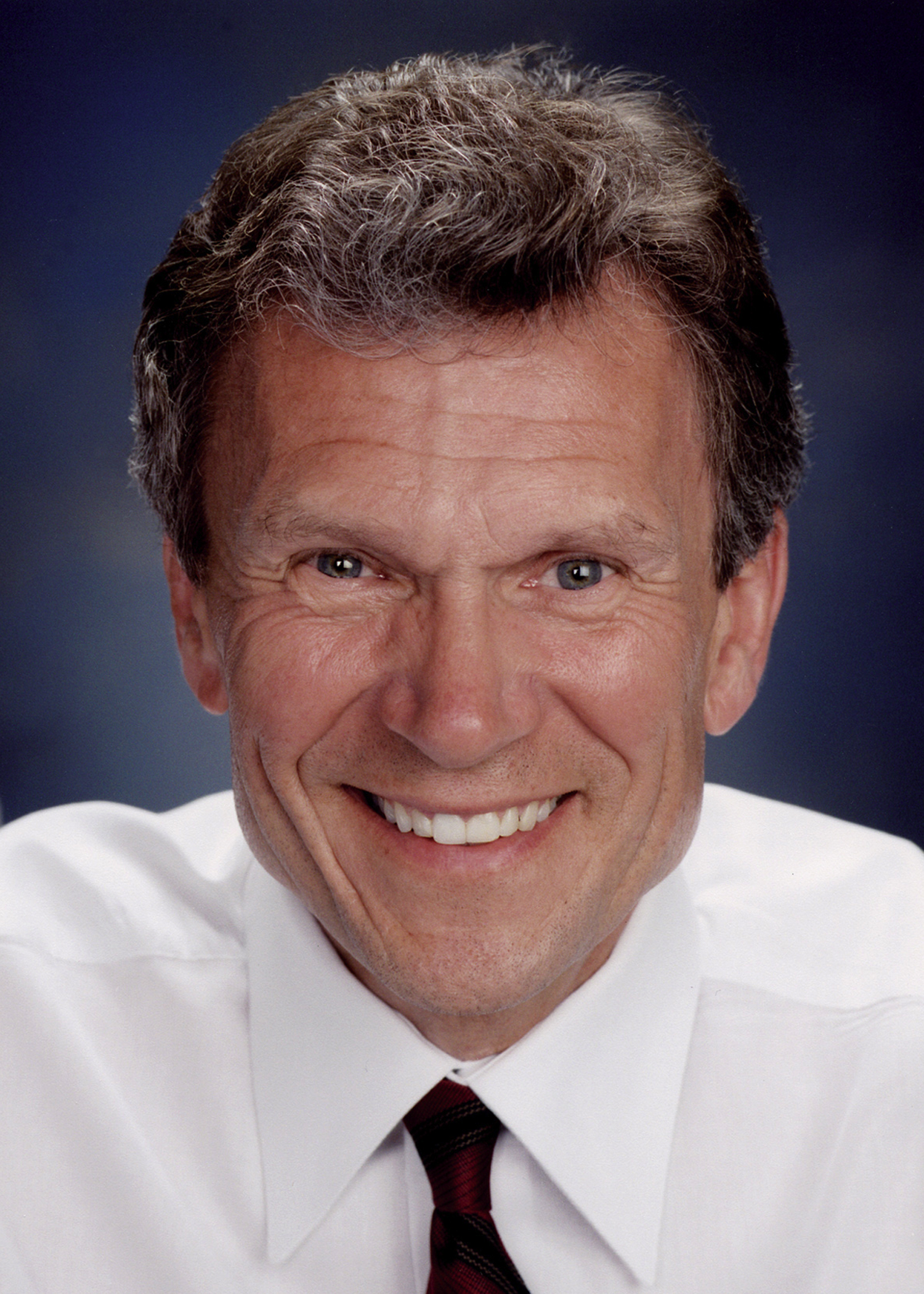
- Official portrait, c. 2002

Senate Majority Leader
- In office June 6, 2001 – January 3, 2003
- Whip: Harry Reid
- Preceded by: Trent Lott
- Succeeded by: Bill Frist
- In office January 3, 2001 – January 20, 2001
- Whip: Harry Reid
- Preceded by: Trent Lott
- Succeeded by: Trent Lott

United States Senator from South Dakota
- In office January 3, 1987 – January 3, 2005
- Preceded by: James Abdnor
- Succeeded by: John Thune
Senate positions
Senate Minority Leader
In office January 3, 2003 – January 3, 2005
Deputy	Harry Reid
Preceded by	Trent Lott
Succeeded by	Harry Reid
In office January 20, 2001 – June 6, 2001
Deputy	Harry Reid
Preceded by	Trent Lott
Succeeded by	Trent Lott
In office January 3, 1995 – January 3, 2001
Deputy	Wendell Ford; Harry Reid
Preceded by	Bob Dole
Succeeded by	Trent Lott
Chair of the Senate Democratic Caucus
In office January 3, 1995 – January 3, 2005
Preceded by	George J. Mitchell
Succeeded by	Harry Reid

Member of the U.S. House of Representatives from South Dakota
- In office January 3, 1979 – January 3, 1987
- Preceded by: Larry Pressler
- Succeeded by: Tim Johnson
- Constituency: 1st district (1979–1983) at-large district (1983–1987)

Personal details
- Born: Thomas Andrew Daschle; December 9, 1947 (age 78) Aberdeen, South Dakota, U.S.
- Party: Democratic
- Spouses: Laurie Fulton (m. 1969; div. 1983); Linda Hall (m. 1984)
- Children: 3, including Nathan
- Education: South Dakota State University (BA)

Military service
- Allegiance: United States
- Branch/service: United States Air Force
- Years of service: 1969–1972
- Unit: Strategic Air Command
- Battles/wars: Vietnam War
- Daschle's voice Daschle on challenges facing the new Homeland Security Department. Recorded January 22, 2003

Thomas Andrew Daschle (/ˈdæʃəl/ DASH-əl; born December 9, 1947) is an American politician and lobbyist who represented South Dakota in the United States Senate from 1987 to 2005. A member of the Democratic Party, he led the Senate Democratic Caucus during the final ten years of his tenure, during which time he served as Senate Majority Leader and Minority Leader.

After leaving the United States Air Force, he was elected to the United States House of Representatives in 1978 and served four terms. In 1986, he was elected to the U.S. Senate, becoming Minority Leader in 1995 and Majority Leader in 2001, becoming the highest-ranking elected official in South Dakota history, a position tied by John Thune in 2025.

In 2004, he was defeated for reelection in a close race by Thune, who would go on to become Majority Leader himself. Later, he took a position as a policy advisor with a lobbying firm, became a senior fellow at the Center for American Progress, and co-authored a book advocating universal health care.

Daschle was an early supporter of Barack Obama's presidential candidacy, and was nominated by President-elect Obama for the position of Secretary of the Department of Health and Human Services after the 2008 election. However, Daschle withdrew his name on February 3, 2009, amid a growing controversy over his failure to properly report and pay income taxes. He works for The Daschle Group, a Public Policy Advisory of Baker Donelson, a large law firm and lobbying group.

== Early life and education ==
Daschle was born in Aberdeen, South Dakota, the son of Elizabeth B. (née Meier) and Sebastian C. Daschle, both of German descent. His paternal grandparents were Volga Germans. He grew up in a working-class Roman Catholic family, the eldest of four brothers. (Note: As a result of controversy surrounding Daschle's views on abortion, he was ordered by his bishop in 2003 to stop identifying as Catholic.)

He attended Central High School in Aberdeen before becoming the first person in his family to graduate from college when he earned a Bachelor of Arts from the Department of Political Science at South Dakota State University in 1969. While attending South Dakota State University, Daschle became a brother of Alpha Phi Omega. From 1969 to 1972, Daschle served in the United States Air Force as an intelligence officer with the Strategic Air Command.

In the mid-1970s, Daschle was an aide to Senator James Abourezk.

== House of Representatives (1979–1987) ==
Although Daschle was not seeking the vice presidency, (Note: Daschle would only have been 33 on Inauguration Day in 1981; two years below the Constitutional minimum age of 35 for a President or Vice-President) he received 10 (0.30%) delegate votes for Vice President of the United States at the 1980 Democratic National Convention. Several others also received protest votes, but incumbent Vice President Walter Mondale was nevertheless renominated easily.

== United States Senate (1987–2005) ==
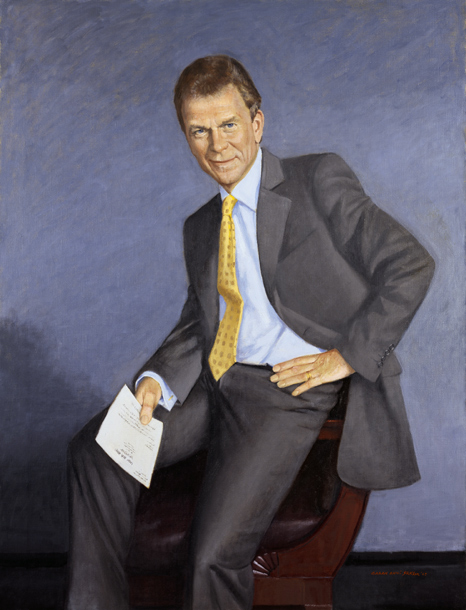
Official Senate portrait by Aaron Shikler

In 1986, Daschle was elected to the U.S. Senate in a close victory over incumbent Republican James Abdnor. In his first year, he was appointed to the Finance Committee.

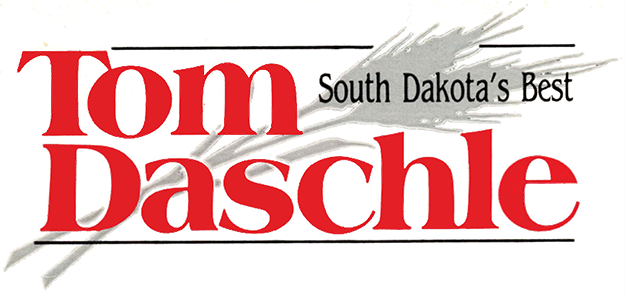
1986 United States Senate Campaign Logo

=== Party leadership ===
In 1994, he was chosen by his colleagues to succeed the retiring Senator George Mitchell as Democratic minority leader. In the history of the Senate, only Lyndon B. Johnson had served fewer years before being elected to lead his party. In addition to the minority leader's post, Daschle served as a member of the Senate Agriculture, Nutrition, and Forestry Committee. South Dakotans reelected Daschle to the Senate with 62.1% of votes in 1998.

At various points in his career, he served on the Veterans Affairs, Indian Affairs, Finance, and Ethics Committees.

When the 107th Congress commenced on January 3, 2001, the Senate was evenly divided—that is, there were 50 Democrats and 50 Republicans. Outgoing Vice President Al Gore acted in his constitutional capacity as ex officio President of the Senate, and used his tie-breaking vote to give the Democrats the majority in that chamber. For the next 17 days, Daschle served as Senate Majority Leader.

Upon the commencement of the Bush administration on January 20, 2001, Dick Cheney became president of the senate, thereby returning Democrats to the minority in that body; Daschle reverted to the position of Senate Minority Leader. However, on June 6, 2001, Senator Jim Jeffords of Vermont announced that he was leaving the Senate Republican caucus to become an independent and to caucus with Democrats; this once again returned control of the body to the Democrats and Daschle again became majority leader.

External videos
- Booknotes interview with Daschle on Like No Other Time, November 30, 2003, C-SPAN

Democratic losses in the November 2002 elections returned the party to the minority in the senate in January 2003, and Daschle once more reverted to being minority leader.

Daschle recounted his senate experiences from 2001 to 2003 in his first book, Like No Other Time: The 107th Congress and the Two Years That Changed America Forever, published in 2003. With Charles Robbins, he has also written the book The U.S. Senate, part of the Fundamentals of American Government series.

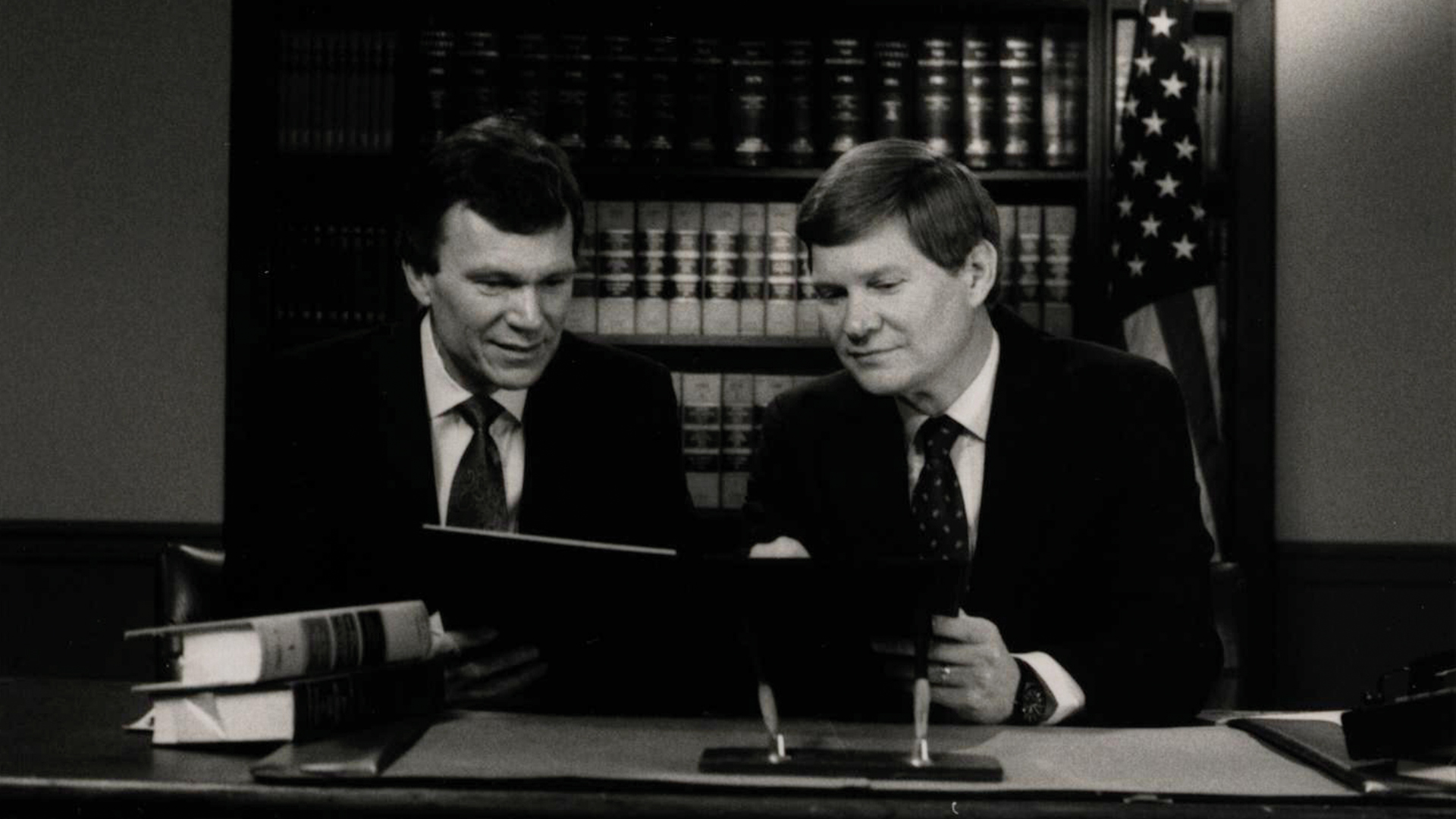
Daschle and Representative Tim Johnson during a Constituent Service Meeting

=== Anthrax case in 2001 ===
In October 2001, while he was the Senate Majority Leader, Daschle's office received a letter containing anthrax, becoming a target of the 2001 anthrax attacks. Some of his staffers were confirmed to have been exposed, as well as several of Senator Russ Feingold's staffers and Capitol police officers. His suite at the Hart Senate Office Building was the focus of an intensive cleanup led by the Environmental Protection Agency.

=== Views on abortion ===
Daschle has a mixed voting record on abortion-related issues, which led the pro-choice organization NARAL to give him a 50% vote rating.

In 1999 and 2003, Daschle voted in favor of the ban on partial-birth abortion, and supported legislation making it a crime to harm an unborn child when someone attacks a pregnant woman. Investigators into the 2001 anthrax attacks, which included Senator Daschle's Capitol Hill office, suspect that alleged anthrax mailer Bruce Ivins may have chosen to target Daschle over his views on abortion, although Ivins's lawyer disputed this alleged motive.

In 2003, Roman Catholic Bishop Robert Carlson reportedly wrote to Daschle, criticizing his stance on abortion as conflicting with Roman Catholic teaching, and stating that Daschle should no longer identify himself as a Catholic.

=== 2004 Senate election ===
In the 2004 Senate election, John Thune defeated Daschle by 4,508 votes, 50.6% to 49.4%. It was the first time that a Senate party leader had lost a bid for reelection since 1952, when Barry Goldwater defeated Ernest McFarland in Arizona. Senate Majority Leader Bill Frist visited South Dakota to campaign for Thune, breaking an unwritten tradition that a leader of one party would not actively campaign for the defeat of the other.

Throughout the campaign, Thune, along with Frist, President George W. Bush, and Vice President Cheney, frequently accused Daschle of being the "chief obstructionist" of Bush's agenda and charged him with using filibusters to unjustly block confirmation of several of Bush's nominees. The Republican candidate also drove home his strong support for the war. In a nationally televised debate on NBC's Meet the Press, Thune accused Daschle of "emboldening the enemy" in his skepticism of the Iraq War.

When the race began in early 2004, Daschle led by 7% in January and February. By May, his lead was just 2% and summer polls showed a varying number of trends: Daschle or Thune led by no more than 2%, but some polls showed a tie. Throughout September, Daschle led Thune by margins of 2–5% while during the entire month of October into the November 2 election, most polls showed that Thune and Daschle were dead even, usually tied 49–49 among likely voters. Some polls showed either Thune or Daschle leading by extremely slim margins.

== Post-Senate career ==
=== Career and public service ===
Following his reelection defeat, Daschle took a position with the lobbying arm of the K Street law firm Alston & Bird. Because he was prohibited by law from lobbying for one year after leaving the Senate, he instead worked as a "special policy adviser" for the firm.

Alston & Bird's healthcare clients include CVS Caremark, the National Association for Home Care and Hospice, Abbott Laboratories, and HealthSouth. The firm was paid $5.8 million between January and September 2008 to represent companies and associations before Congress and the executive branch, with 60% of that money coming from the healthcare industry. Daschle was recruited by the former Republican Senate Majority Leader Bob Dole. Daschle's salary from Alston & Bird for the year 2008 was reportedly $2 million.

Daschle was also a senior fellow at the Center for American Progress. In addition, he served as National Co-Chair of ONE Vote '08, along with former senator Bill Frist. He and former senators George Mitchell, Bob Dole, and Howard Baker formed the Bipartisan Policy Center (BPC), dedicated to finding bipartisan solutions for policy disputes. Daschle is also a co-chair of BPC's Health Project.

In 2003, Daschle received the Golden Plate Award of the American Academy of Achievement presented by Awards Council member Senator Bill Frist.

In May 2005, South Dakota State University, Daschle's alma mater, conferred upon him an honorary doctorate for public service. In May 2011, Daschle was further honored with an honorary Doctorate of Humane Letters by Northern State University in his hometown of Aberdeen.

In late September 2005, Daschle caught the attention of the media by reactivating his political action committee, changing its name from DASHPAC to New Leadership for America PAC and procuring a speaking slot at the Iowa Democratic Party's annual Jefferson-Jackson Day dinner. He continued to keep a relatively high-profile among Democratic interest groups. These moves were interpreted by the media as an exploration of a potential 2008 Presidential candidacy. On December 2, 2006, he announced he would not run for president in 2008.

In an appearance on Meet the Press on February 12, 2006, Daschle endorsed a controversial warrantless surveillance program conducted by the National Security Agency (NSA), explaining that he had been briefed on the program while he was the Democratic leader in the Senate.

In addition, Senator Daschle is a member of the board of trustees for the Richard C. Blum Center for Developing Economies at the University of California, Berkeley. The center is focused on finding solutions to address the crisis of extreme poverty and disease in the developing world.

Daschle is a Member of the Global Leadership Foundation, an organization which works to support democratic leadership, prevent and resolve conflict through mediation and promote good governance in the form of democratic institutions, open markets, human rights and the rule of law. It does so by making available, discreetly and in confidence, the experience of former leaders to today's national leaders. It is a not-for-profit organization composed of former heads of government, senior governmental and international organization officials who work closely with heads of Government on governance-related issues of concern to them.

Daschle also served as vice chair of the board of directors of National Democratic Institute for International Affairs.

Daschle is a member of the ReFormers Caucus of Issue One.

Daschle is the co-chair of the national advisory board at the National Institute for Civil Discourse (NICD). The institute was created at the University of Arizona after the 2011 shooting of former Congresswoman Gabby Giffords that killed six people and wounded 13 others.

In 2019, Daschle was named to the advisory board of Northern Swan Holdings Inc., a cannabis investment firm. Daschle stated: "I believe it is imperative to loosen the restrictions on cannabis so we can research its properties and fully understand how patients can benefit from its medicinal use." In 2020, Daschle endorsed Constitutional Amendment A, a ballot initiative to legalize cannabis for recreational use in South Dakota.

In 2021, Daschle co-wrote an op-ed for The Hill criticizing proposed cuts to pandemic preparedness programs, describing them as "unthinkable" in the midst of the COVID-19 pandemic.

=== Obama campaign ===
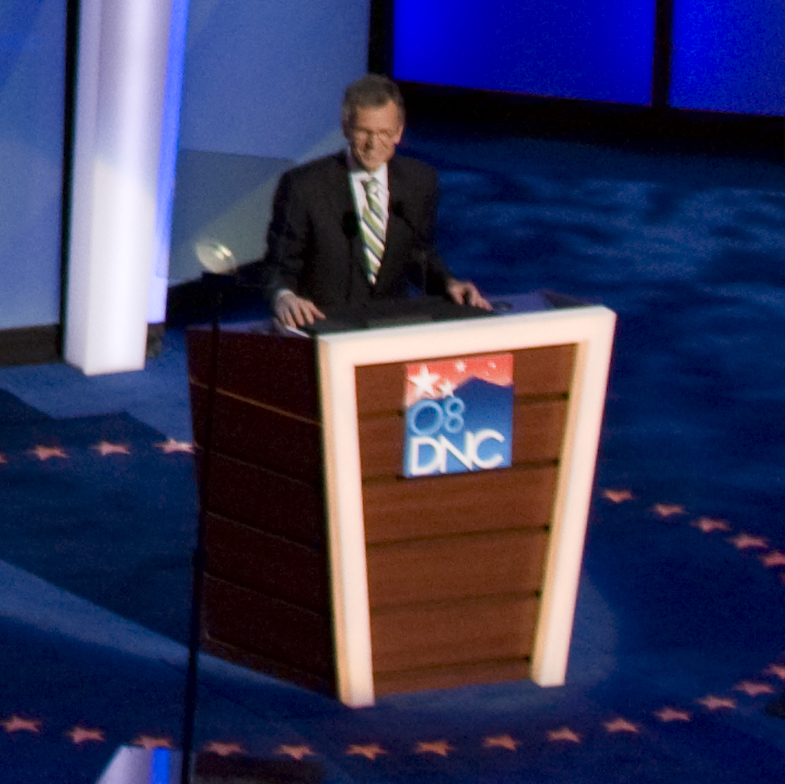
Daschle speaks during the third night of the 2008 Democratic National Convention in Denver.

On February 21, 2007, the Associated Press reported that Daschle, after ruling out a presidential bid of his own in December 2006, had thrown his support behind Senator Barack Obama of Illinois for the 2008 presidential election, saying that Obama "personifies the future of Democratic leadership in our country."

In January 2005, having suggested that Obama take on some of his staffers, Daschle exited the Senate just as Obama entered. These included Daschle's outgoing chief-of-staff Pete Rouse who helped to create a two-year plan in the Senate that would fast-track Obama for the presidential nomination. Daschle himself told Obama in 2006 that "windows of opportunity for running for the presidency close quickly. And that he should not assume, if he passes up this window, that there will be another."

During the 2008 presidential campaign, Daschle served as a key advisor to Obama and one of the national co-chairs for Obama's campaign. On June 3, 2008, Obama lost to Hillary Clinton in the Democratic primary in Daschle's home state of South Dakota, although that night Obama clinched his party's nomination anyway.

Two days later, sources indicated Daschle "is interested in universal health care and might relish serving as HHS secretary." In the general election campaign, Daschle continued to consult Obama, campaign for him across swing states, and advise his campaign organization until Obama was ultimately elected the 44th President of the United States on November 4, 2008.

=== Obama administration nomination ===
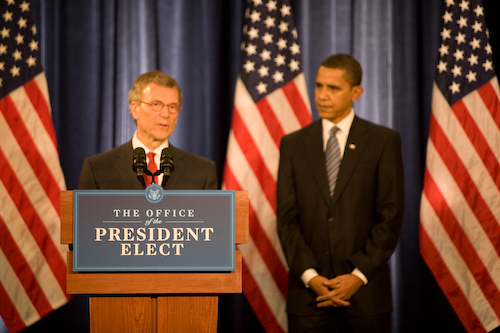
Daschle, standing with then-President-elect Barack Obama, speaks to reporters after the announcement of his selection to be Obama's nominee for the position of Secretary of Health and Human Services.

On November 19, 2008, the press reported that Daschle had accepted Obama's offer to be nominated for Health and Human Services Secretary. His selection was announced at a news conference with Obama on December 11, 2008.

Some organizations objected to Daschle's selection, arguing that his work at Alston & Bird was tantamount to lobbying and therefore his selection violated Obama's promise to keep special interests out of the White House. According to Ellen Miller, executive director of the Sunlight Foundation, Daschle technically complies with the transition rules against lobbyists but "many power brokers never register as lobbyists, but they are every bit as powerful." Stephanie Cutter, a spokeswoman for the Obama transition, responded that Daschle's work "does not represent a bar to his service in the transition" since "he was not a lobbyist, and he will recuse himself from any work that presents a conflict of interest." Ron Pollack, executive director of Families USA, praised Daschle on his nomination to Secretary of Health and Human Services for his "deep commitment to securing high-quality, affordable health care for everyone in our nation."

When Daschle was officially nominated for his Cabinet position on January 20, 2009, confirmation by the Senate was required. The Senate Health, Education, Labor, and Pensions (HELP) Committee held a confirmation hearing for Daschle on January 8, 2009. A second Senate committee, the Finance Committee, also traditionally reviews HHS Secretary nominees; the committee discussed his nomination behind closed doors on February 2, 2009.

==== Withdrawal ====
On January 30, 2009, it was reported that Daschle's friendship and business partnership with businessman Leo Hindery could cause problems for Daschle's Senate confirmation. Daschle has been a paid consultant and advisor to Hindery's InterMedia Partners since 2005, during which time he received from Hindery access to a limousine and chauffeur. Daschle reportedly did not declare this service on his annual tax forms as required by law. A spokeswoman for Daschle said that he "simply and probably naively" considered the use of the car and driver "a generous offer" from Hindery, "a longtime friend." Daschle told the Senate Finance Committee that in June 2008—just as he was letting the press know he would like to be HHS secretary in an Obama administration—that "something made him think that the car service might be taxable" and he began seeking to remedy the situation.

Daschle reportedly also did not pay taxes on an additional $83,333 that he earned as a consultant to InterMedia Partners in 2007; this was discovered by Senator Daschle's accountant in December 2008. According to ABC News, Daschle also took tax deductions for $14,963 in donations that he made between 2005 and 2007 to charitable organizations that did not meet the requirements for being tax deductible.

The former senator paid the three years of owed taxes and interest—an amount totaling $140,167—in January 2009, but still reportedly owed "Medicare taxes equal to 2.9 percent" of the value of the car service he received, amounting to "thousands of dollars in additional unpaid taxes."

On February 3, 2009, Daschle withdrew his nomination, saying that he did not wish to be a "distraction" to the Obama agenda.

=== Health policy ===
Daschle co-wrote the 2008 book Critical: What We Can Do About the Health-Care Crisis ISBN 9780312383015. He and his co-authors point out that "most of the world's highest-ranking health-care systems employ some kind of 'single-payer' strategy – that is, the government, directly or through insurers, is responsible for paying doctors, hospitals, and other health-care providers." They argue that a single-payer approach is simple, equitable, provides everyone with the same benefits, and saves billions of dollars through economies of scale and simplified administration. They concede that implementing a single-payer system in the United States would be "politically problematic" even though some polls show more satisfaction with the single-payer Medicare system than private insurance.

A key element of the single-payer plan that Daschle and his co-authors propose in the book is a new "Federal Health Board" that would establish the framework and fill in the details. The board would somehow be simultaneously "insulated from political pressure" and "accountable to elected officials and the American people." The board would "promote 'high-value' medical care by recommending coverage of those drugs and procedures backed by solid evidence." This proposal has been criticized by conservatives and libertarians who argue that such a board will lead to rationing of health care, and by progressives who believe the board will, as one writer put it, "get defanged by lobbyists immediately."

One of Daschle's co-authors, Jeanne Lambrew, had been slated before his withdrawal to serve as his deputy in the White House Office of Health Reform.

Daschle also served as a panelist on the Blue Ribbon Study Panel on Biodefense, a body that recommended changes to U.S. policy to strengthen national biodefense. In order to address biological threats facing the nation, the Blue Ribbon Study Panel on Biodefense created a 33 step initiative for the U.S. Government to implement. Headed by former senator Joe Lieberman and former governor Tom Ridge, the Study Panel assembled in Washington, D.C., for four meetings concerning current biodefense programs. The Study Panel concluded that the federal government had little to no defense mechanisms in case of a biological event. The Study Panel's final report, The National Blueprint for Biodefense, proposes a string of solutions and recommendations for the U.S. Government to take, including items such as giving the vice president authority over biodefense responsibilities and merging the entire biodefense budget. These solutions represent the Panel's call to action in order to increase awareness and activity for pandemic related issues.

=== 9/11 ===
Daschle claims he was asked by vice president Dick Cheney "not to investigate" the events of 9/11.

He told reporters, "the vice president expressed the concern that a review of what happened on September 11 would take resources and personnel away from the effort in the war on terrorism. I acknowledged that concern, and it is for that reason that the Intelligence Committee is going to begin this effort, trying to limit the scope and the overall review of what happened. But clearly, I think the American people are entitled to know what happened and why."

== Personal life ==
Daschle has been married to Linda Hall, who was Miss Kansas in 1976, since 1984, one year after his marriage to his first wife, Laurie, later-U.S. Ambassador to Denmark, ended in divorce.

Hall was acting administrator of the Federal Aviation Administration in the Clinton administration; she is now a Washington lobbyist. Her lobbying clients have included American Airlines, Lockheed Martin, and Boeing, Senate lobbying records show.

Tom Daschle has three children from his first marriage: Kelly, Nathan, and Lindsay. Nathan is the CEO of Ruck.us and former executive director of the Democratic Governors Association.

== Honors ==
- Grand Cordon of the Order of the Rising Sun (2023)

== See also ==
- Unsuccessful nominations to the Cabinet of the United States

== Notes ==
U.S. House of Representatives
Preceded by Larry Pressler	Member of the U.S. House of Representatives from South Dakota's 1st congressional district 1979–1983	Constituency abolished
New constituency	Member of the U.S. House of Representatives from South Dakota's at-large congressional district 1983–1987	Succeeded by Tim Johnson
Party political offices
Preceded by Robert Byrd, Alan Cranston, Al Gore, Gary Hart, Bennett Johnston, Ted Kennedy, Tip O'Neill, Don Riegle, Paul Sarbanes, Jim Sasser	Response to the State of the Union address 1983; Served alongside: Les AuCoin, Joe Biden, Bill Bradley, Robert Byrd, Bill Hefner, Barbara B. Kennelly, George Miller, Tip O'Neill, Paul Simon, Paul Tsongas, Tim Wirth	Succeeded by Max Baucus, Joe Biden, David L. Boren, Barbara Boxer, Robert Byrd, Dante Fascell, Bill Gray, Tom Harkin, Dee Huddleston, Carl Levin, Tip O'Neill, Claiborne Pell
Preceded by Bill Clinton; Bob Graham; Tip O'Neill	Response to the State of the Union address 1986; Served alongside: Bill Gray, George J. Mitchell, Chuck Robb, Harriett Woods	Succeeded by Robert Byrd; Jim Wright
Preceded by George McGovern	Democratic nominee for U.S. Senator from South Dakota (Class 3); 1986, 1992, 1998, 2004	Vacant Title next held by Jay Williams
Preceded by Robert Byrd	Chair of the Senate Democratic Policy Committee; 1989–1999; Served alongside: George Mitchell, Harry Reid	Succeeded by Byron Dorgan
Preceded by George Mitchell	Senate Democratic Leader; 1995–2005	Succeeded by Harry Reid
Preceded by Susan Collins; Bill Frist	Response to the State of the Union address 2001; Served alongside: Dick Gephardt	Succeeded by Dick Gephardt
Preceded by Gary Locke	Response to the State of the Union address 2004; Served alongside: Nancy Pelosi	Succeeded by Nancy Pelosi; Harry Reid
U.S. Senate
Preceded by James Abdnor	U.S. Senator (Class 3) from South Dakota; 1987–2005; Served alongside: Larry Pressler, Tim Johnson	Succeeded by John Thune
Preceded by Bob Dole	Senate Minority Leader; 1995–2001	Succeeded by Trent Lott
Preceded by Trent Lott	Senate Minority Leader; 2001	Succeeded by Trent Lott
Preceded by Trent Lott	Senate Majority Leader; 2001–2003	Succeeded by Bill Frist
Preceded by Trent Lott	Senate Minority Leader; 2003–2005	Succeeded by Harry Reid
U.S. order of precedence (ceremonial)
Preceded by Trent Lott as Former U.S. Senate Majority Leader	Order of precedence of the United States as Former U.S. Senate Majority Leader	Succeeded by Bill Frist as Former U.S. Senate Majority Leader
