= 1988 United States House of Representatives elections =

House elections for the 101st U.S. Congress

- November 8, 1988

All 435 seats in the United States House of Representatives 218 seats needed for a majority
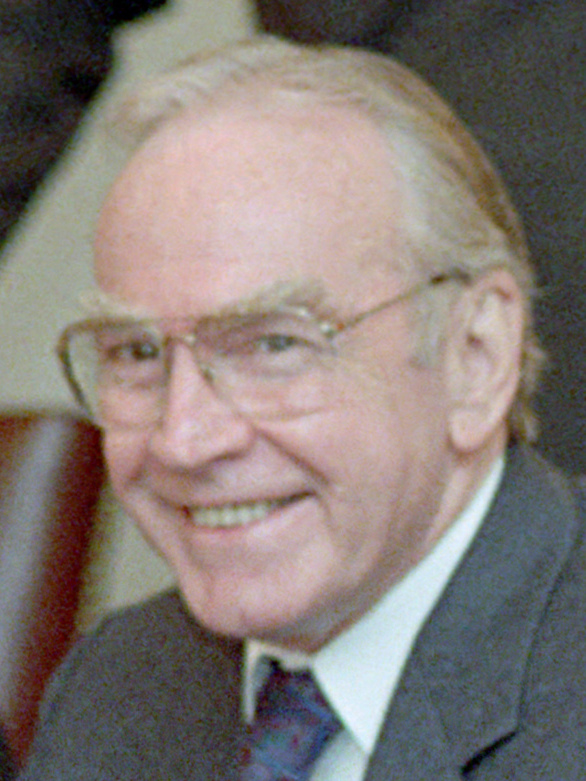

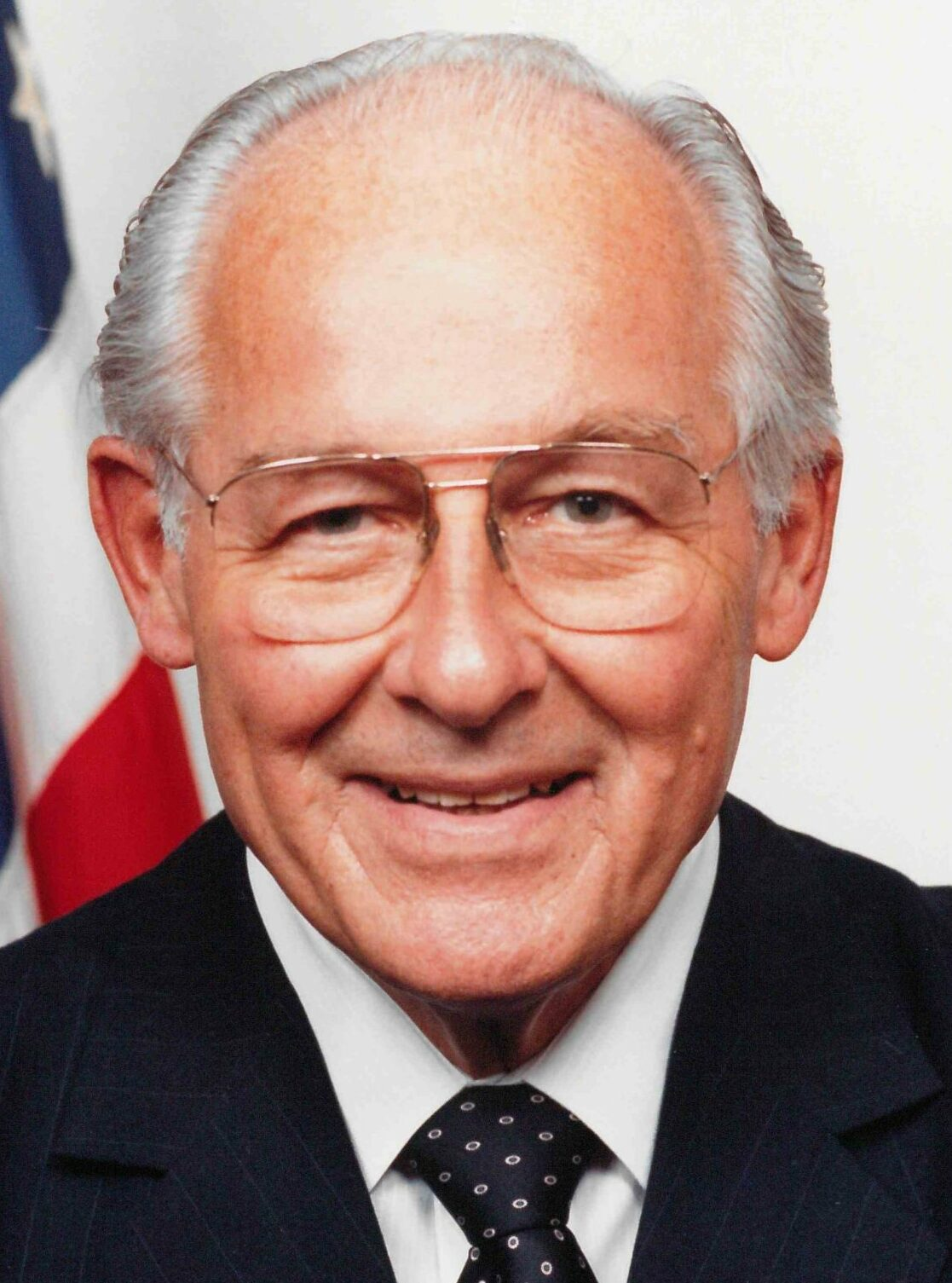
	Majority party	Minority party
Leader	Jim Wright	Bob Michel
Party	Democratic	Republican
Leader since	January 3, 1987	January 3, 1981
Leader's seat	Texas 12th	Illinois 18th
Last election	258 seats	177 seats
Seats won	260	175
Seat change	▲2	▼2
Popular vote	43,544,565	37,209,219
Percentage	53.3%	45.6%
Swing	▼1.0pp	▲1.2pp
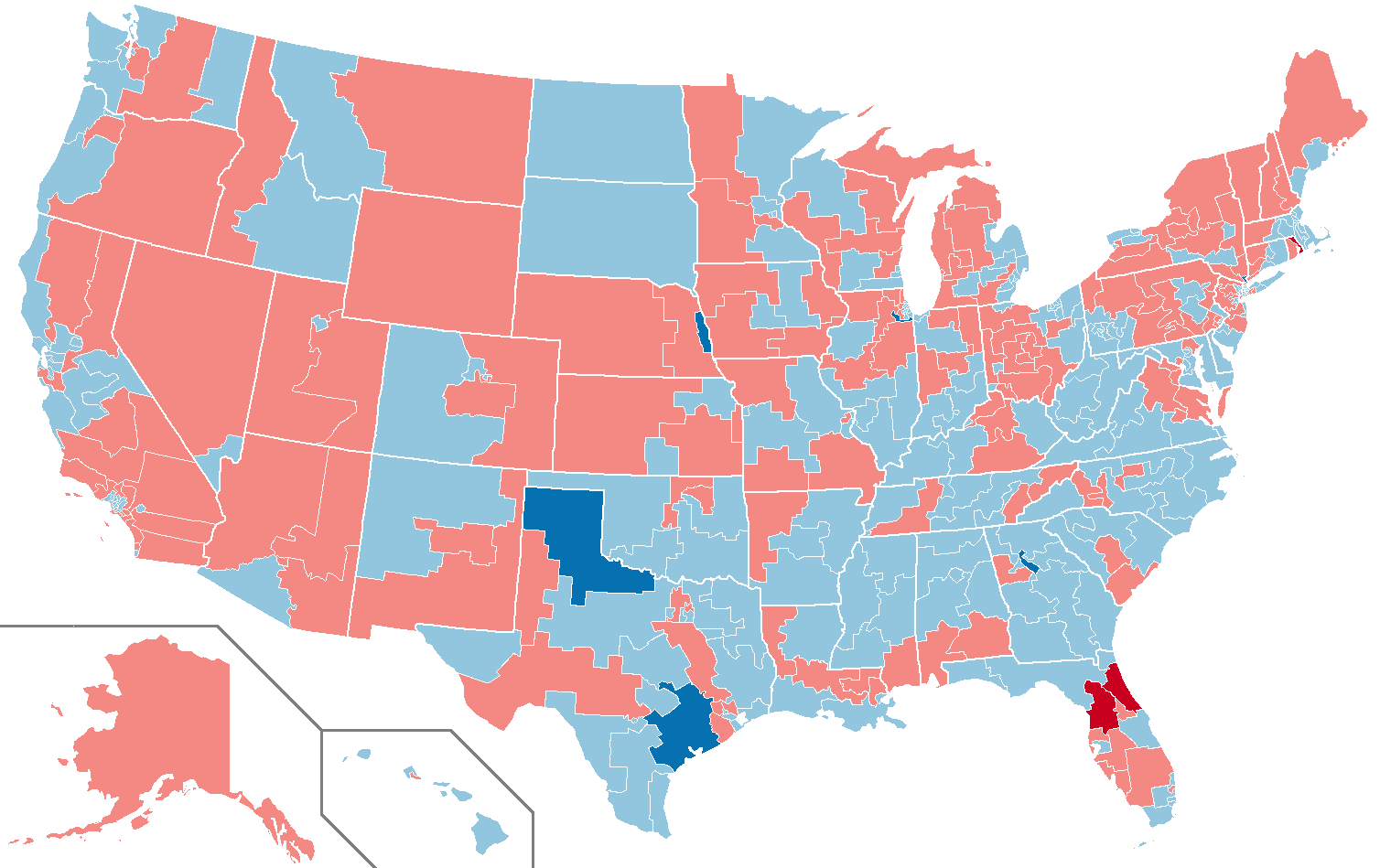
- Results: Democratic hold Democratic gain Republican hold Republican gain
Speaker before election
Jim Wright
Democratic
Elected Speaker
Jim Wright
Democratic

The 1988 United States House of Representatives elections was an election for the United States House of Representatives on November 8, 1988, to elect members to serve in the 101st United States Congress. They coincided with the election of George H. W. Bush as president. Although Bush won with a strong majority, his Republican Party lost a net of two seats to the Democratic Party, slightly increasing the Democratic majority in the House. It was the first time since 1960 that an incoming president's party lost seats in the House.

== Overall results ==
409 incumbent members sought reelection, but one was defeated in a primary and six were defeated in the general election for a total of 402 incumbents winning. This was the highest number and percentage of incumbents who won reelection between 1954 and 1992.

The Republicans did not field a candidate in one-fourth of the seats in the Southern United States. This is the last congressional election in which Republicans won a House seat in Hawaii for a full term and the last time they won a seat in Vermont.

↓
260	175
Democratic	Republican

Party	Seats			Seat percentage	Vote percentage	Popular vote
Party	Last election (1986)	This election	Net change	Seat percentage	Vote percentage	Popular vote
Democratic Party	258	260	▲2	59.8%	53.3%	43,544,565
Republican Party	177	175	▼2	40.2%	45.6%	37,209,219
Libertarian Party	0	0	Steady	0.0%	0.6%	445,708
Independent	0	0	Steady	0.0%	0.2%	161,381
Peace and Freedom Party	0	0	Steady	0.0%	0.1%	89,494
Right to Life Party	0	0	Steady	0.0%	0.1%	52,296
Conservative Party	0	0	Steady	0.0%	0.1%	47,577
Others	0	0	Steady	0.0%	0.2%	131,945
Totals	435	435	Steady	100.0%	100.0%	81,682,185

Source: Election Statistics – Office of the Clerk

Popular vote
Democratic	53.31%
Republican	45.55%
Libertarian	0.55%
Others	0.59%

House seats
Democratic	59.77%
Republican	40.23%

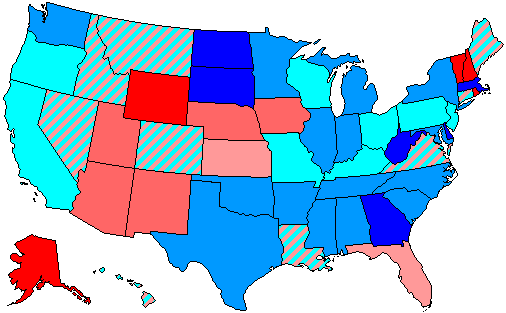
House seats by party holding plurality in state: 80+% Democratic / 80+% Republican; 60+% to 80% Democratic / 60+% to 80% Republican; Up to 60% Democratic / Up to 60% Republican

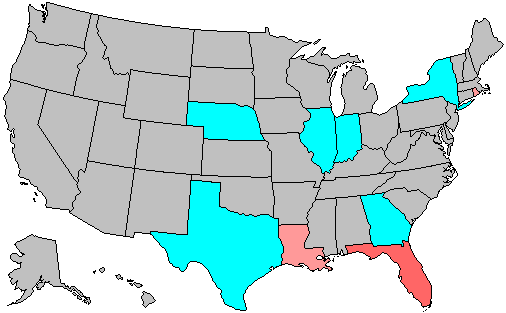
/ 3-5 Republican gain; 1-2 Democratic gain / 1-2 Republican gain; no net change

== Retirements ==
=== Democrats ===
1. Florida 6: Buddy MacKay retired to run for U.S. Senate.
2. Florida 14: Dan Mica retired to run for U.S. Senate.
3. Illinois 22: Kenneth J. Gray retired.
4. Massachusetts 2: Edward Boland retired.
5. Mississippi 4: Wayne Dowdy retired to run for U.S. Senate.
6. New Jersey 10: Peter W. Rodino retired.
7. New York 23: Samuel S. Stratton retired.
8. Tennessee 8: Ed Jones retired.
9. Washington 3: Don Bonker retired run for U.S. Senate.
10. Washington 7: Mike Lowry retired run for U.S. Senate.

=== Republicans ===
1. California 40: Robert Badham retired.
2. California 42: Dan Lungren retired to become California State Treasurer.
3. Florida 13: Connie Mack III retired to run for U.S. Senate.
4. Mississippi 5: Trent Lott retired to run for U.S. Senate.
5. Missouri 7: Gene Taylor retired.
6. Nebraska 2: Hal Daub retired to run for U.S. Senate.
7. New Hampshire 2: Judd Gregg retired to run for governor of New Hampshire.
8. New Mexico 1: Manuel Lujan Jr. retired.
9. New York 27: George C. Wortley retired.
10. Ohio 5: Del Latta retired.
11. Texas 13: Beau Boulter retired to run for U.S. Senate.
12. Vermont at-large: Jim Jeffords retired to run for U.S. Senate.

== Resignations and deaths ==
=== Democrats ===
1. Tennessee 5: Bill Boner resigned October 5, 1987, to become Mayor of Nashville.
2. Virginia 5: Dan Daniel died January 24, 1988.
3. New Jersey 5: James J. Howard died March 25, 1988.
4. New York 19: Mario Biaggi resigned August 5, 1988.

=== Republicans ===
1. Louisiana 5: Buddy Roemer resigned March 3, 1988, to become Governor of Louisiana.
2. Tennessee 2: John Duncan Sr. died June 21, 1988.

== Incumbents defeated ==
=== In primary elections ===
==== Republicans ====
1. California 12: Ernie Konnyu lost renomination to Tom Campbell, who won the general election.

=== In general elections ===
==== Democrats ====
Two Democrats lost re-election to Republicans

1. Florida 4: Bill Chappell lost re-election to Craig James.
2. Rhode Island 2: Fernand St Germain lost re-election to Ronald Machtley.

==== Republicans ====
Four Republicans lost re-election to Democrats

1. Georgia 4: Pat Swindall lost re-election to Ben Jones.
2. Illinois 4: Jack Davis lost re-election to George E. Sangmeister.
3. New York 20: Joe DioGuardi lost re-election to Nita Lowey.
4. Texas 14: Mac Sweeney lost re-election to Greg Laughlin.

== Open seats that changed parties ==
=== Republican seats won by Democrats ===
Two Republican seats were won by Democrats:

1. Nebraska 2: won by Peter Hoagland.
2. Texas 13: won by Bill Sarpalius.

=== Democratic seats won by Republicans ===
One Democratic seat was won by a Republican:

1. Florida 6: won by Cliff Stearns.

== Open seats that parties held ==
=== Democratic seats held by Democrats ===
Democrats held twelve of their open seats

1. Florida 14: Won by Harry Johnston
2. Illinois 22: Won by Glenn Poshard
3. Massachusetts 2: Won by Richard Neal
4. Mississippi 4: Won by Michael Parker
5. New Jersey 3: Won by Frank Pallone
6. New Jersey 10: Won by Donald M. Payne
7. New York 19: Won by Elliot Engel
8. New York 23: Won by Michael McNulty
9. Tennessee 8: Won by John S. Tanner
10. Washington 3: Won by Jolene Unsoeld
11. Washington 7: Won by Jim McDermott
12. American Samoa at-large: Won by Eni Faleomavaega

=== Republican seats held by Republicans ===
Republicans held thirteen of their open seats

1. California 12: Won by Tom Campbell
2. California 40: Won by Christopher Cox
3. California 42: Won by Dana Rohrabacher
4. Florida 13: Won by Porter Goss
5. Mississippi 5: Won by Larkin I. Smith
6. Missouri 7: Won by Mel Hancock
7. New Hampshire 2: Won by Chuck Douglas
8. New Mexico 1: Won by Steven Schiff
9. New York 27: Won by James T. Walsh
10. New York 31: Won by Bill Paxon
11. Ohio 5: Won by Paul Gillmor
12. Tennessee 2: Won by Jimmy Duncan, who also won the district's special election, see below
13. Vermont at-large: Won by Peter Plympton Smith

== Closest races ==
Thirty four races were decided by 10% or lower.

District	Winner	Margin
Washington 3rd	Democratic	0.28%
Florida 4th	Republican (flip)	0.32%
Oregon 5th	Republican	0.32%
Illinois 4th	Democratic (flip)	0.58%
North Carolina 11th	Democratic	0.72%
Maryland 1st	Democratic	0.80%
Nebraska 2nd	Democratic (flip)	1.34%
New York 1st	Democratic	1.58%
California 19th	Republican	1.72%
New York 20th	Democratic (flip)	2.84%
North Carolina 8th	Democratic	2.98%
New Mexico 1st	Republican	3.28%
Vermont at-large	Republican	3.71%
New Jersey 3rd	Democratic	4.21%
South Carolina 4th	Democratic	4.30%
Texas 13th	Democratic (flip)	4.92%
Illinois 21st	Democratic	5.20%
North Carolina 5th	Democratic	5.22%
Oklahoma 1st	Republican	5.26%
California 12th	Republican	5.63%
South Carolina 2nd	Republican	6.11%
Indiana 2nd	Democratic	6.40%
New York 31st	Republican	6.78%
Florida 6th	Republican (flip)	6.92%
Missouri 7th	Republican	6.93%
Texas 14th	Democratic (flip)	7.33%
Michigan 12th	Democratic	8.12%
South Carolina 3rd	Democratic	8.14%
Indiana 3rd	Republican	8.58%
Minnesota 7th	Republican	9.16%
Illinois 18th	Republican	9.42%
Florida 14th	Democratic	9.70%
Michigan 2nd	Republican	9.91%
Mississippi 5th	Republican	9.95%

== Special elections ==
Ordered by election date, then by state/district.

District	Incumbent	Party	First elected	Result	Candidates
Tennessee 5	Bill Boner	Democratic	1978	Incumbent resigned October 5, 1987, to become Mayor of Nashville. New member elected January 19, 1988. Democratic hold. Winner was subsequently re-elected in November; see below.	▌ ✓ Bob Clement (Democratic) 62.3%; ▌Terry Holcomb (Republican) 36.3%; Others: ▌Suzanne Stewart (Independent) 0.8%; ▌Joe Driscoll (Independent) 0.7%
Louisiana 4	Buddy Roemer	Democratic	1980	Incumbent resigned March 3, 1988, to become Governor of Louisiana. New member elected April 16, 1988. Republican gain. Winner was subsequently re-elected in November; see below.	▌ ✓ Jim McCrery (Republican) 51%; ▌ Foster Campbell (Democratic) 49%
Virginia 5	Dan Daniel	Democratic	1968	Incumbent died January 24, 1988. New member elected June 14, 1988. Democratic hold. Winner was subsequently re-elected in November; see below.	▌ ✓ Lewis F. Payne Jr. (Democratic) 59.3%; ▌Linda Arey (Republican) 40.7%
Illinois 21	Melvin Price	Democratic	1944	Incumbent died April 22, 1988. New member elected August 9, 1988. Democratic hold. Winner was subsequently re-elected in November; see below.	▌ ✓ Jerry Costello (Democratic) 51.5%; ▌Robert Gaffner (Republican) 48.5%
New Jersey 3	James J. Howard	Democratic	1964	Incumbent died March 25, 1988. New member elected November 8, 1988. Democratic hold. Concurrently, winner was also elected to the next term; see below.	▌ ✓ Frank Pallone (Democratic) 51.95%; ▌Joseph Azzolina (Republican) 47.29%; ▌Laura Stewart (Libertarian) 0.76%
Tennessee 2	John Duncan Sr.	Republican	1964	Incumbent died June 21, 1988. New member elected November 8, 1988. Republican hold. Concurrently, winner was also elected to the next term; see below.	▌ ✓ Jimmy Duncan (Republican) 56.11%; ▌Dudley W. Taylor (Democratic) 42.61%; ▌Charles West (Independent) 1.28%

== Alabama ==
District	Incumbent	Party	First elected	Result	Candidates
Alabama 1	Sonny Callahan	Republican	1984	Incumbent re-elected.	▌ ✓ Sonny Callahan (Republican) 59.3%; ▌John M. Tyson Jr. (Democratic) 40.0%; ▌Kenneth Ament (Libertarian) 0.8%
Alabama 2	Bill Dickinson	Republican	1964	Incumbent re-elected.	▌ ✓ Bill Dickinson (Republican) 94.2%; ▌Joel Brooke King (Libertarian) 5.8%
Alabama 3	Bill Nichols	Democratic	1966	Incumbent re-elected.	▌ ✓ Bill Nichols (Democratic) 96.1%; ▌Jerome Shockley (Libertarian) 3.9%
Alabama 4	Tom Bevill	Democratic	1966	Incumbent re-elected.	▌ ✓ Tom Bevill (Democratic) 96.2%; ▌John Sebastian (Libertarian) 3.8%
Alabama 5	Ronnie Flippo	Democratic	1976	Incumbent re-elected.	▌ ✓ Ronnie Flippo (Democratic) 64.4%; ▌Stan McDonald (Republican) 34.6%; ▌John Palmer (Libertarian) 1.1%
Alabama 6	Ben Erdreich	Democratic	1982	Incumbent re-elected.	▌ ✓ Ben Erdreich (Democratic) 66.5%; ▌Charles Caddis (Republican) 32.9%; ▌William Wingo (Libertarian) 0.5%
Alabama 7	Claude Harris Jr.	Democratic	1986	Incumbent re-elected.	▌ ✓ Claude Harris Jr. (Democratic) 67.7%; ▌James E. Bacon (Republican) 31.5%; ▌Alan F. Barksdale (Libertarian) 0.7%

== Alaska ==
District	Incumbent	Party	First elected	Result	Candidates
Alaska at-large	Don Young	Republican	1973 (special)	Incumbent re-elected.	▌ ✓ Don Young (Republican) 62.7%; ▌Peter Gruenstein (Democratic) 37.3%

== Arizona ==
District	Incumbent	Party	First elected	Result	Candidates
Arizona 1	John Jacob Rhodes III	Republican	1986	Incumbent re-elected.	▌ ✓ John Jacob Rhodes III (Republican) 72.1%; ▌John M. Fillmore (Democratic) 27.9%
Arizona 2	Mo Udall	Democratic	1961 (special)	Incumbent re-elected.	▌ ✓ Mo Udall (Democratic) 73.3%; ▌Joseph D. Sweeney (Republican) 26.7%
Arizona 3	Bob Stump	Republican	1976 (Note: Stump was originally elected as a Democrat. He switched parties in 1982 and was re-elected as such that year.)	Incumbent re-elected.	▌ ✓ Bob Stump (Republican) 68.9%; ▌Dave Moss (Democratic) 28.6%; ▌John Parsons (Independent) 2.6%
Arizona 4	Jon Kyl	Republican	1986	Incumbent re-elected.	▌ ✓ Jon Kyl (Republican) 87.1%; ▌Gary Sprunk (Libertarian) 12.9%
Arizona 5	Jim Kolbe	Republican	1984	Incumbent re-elected.	▌ ✓ Jim Kolbe (Republican) 67.8%; ▌Judith E. Belcher (Democratic) 32.2%

== Arkansas ==
District	Incumbent	Party	First elected	Result	Candidates
Arkansas 1	Bill Alexander	Democratic	1968	Incumbent re-elected.	▌ ✓ Bill Alexander (Democratic); Uncontested
Arkansas 2	Tommy F. Robinson	Democratic	1984	Incumbent re-elected.	▌ ✓ Tommy F. Robinson (Democratic) 83.5%; ▌Warren D. Carpenter (Republican) 16.5%
Arkansas 3	John Paul Hammerschmidt	Republican	1966	Incumbent re-elected.	▌ ✓ John Paul Hammerschmidt (Republican) 74.7%; ▌David Stewart (Democratic) 25.3%
Arkansas 4	Beryl Anthony Jr.	Democratic	1978	Incumbent re-elected.	▌ ✓ Beryl Anthony Jr. (Democratic) 69.2%; ▌Roger N. Bell (Republican) 30.8%

== California ==
District	Incumbent	Party	First elected	Result	Candidates
California 1	Douglas H. Bosco	Democratic	1982	Incumbent re-elected.	▌ ✓ Douglas H. Bosco (Democratic) 62.9%; ▌Samuel Vanderbilt (Republican) 28.4%; ▌Eric Fried (Peace and Freedom) 8.7%
California 2	Wally Herger	Republican	1986	Incumbent re-elected.	▌ ✓ Wally Herger (Republican) 58.8%; ▌Wayne Meyer (Democratic) 38.5%; ▌Doc Pendery (Libertarian) 2.6%
California 3	Bob Matsui	Democratic	1978	Incumbent re-elected.	▌ ✓ Bob Matsui (Democratic) 71.2%; ▌Lowell P. Landowski (Republican) 28.8%
California 4	Vic Fazio	Democratic	1978	Incumbent re-elected.	▌ ✓ Vic Fazio (Democratic) 99.3%
California 5	Nancy Pelosi	Democratic	1987 (special)	Incumbent re-elected.	▌ ✓ Nancy Pelosi (Democratic) 76.4%; ▌Bruce O'Neill (Republican) 19.3%; ▌Ted Zuur (Peace and Freedom) 2.3%; ▌Sam Grove (Libertarian) 2.0%
California 6	Barbara Boxer	Democratic	1982	Incumbent re-elected.	▌ ✓ Barbara Boxer (Democratic) 73.4%; ▌William Steinmetz (Republican) 26.6%
California 7	George Miller	Democratic	1974	Incumbent re-elected.	▌ ✓ George Miller (Democratic) 68.4%; ▌Jean Last (Republican) 31.6%
California 8	Ron Dellums	Democratic	1970	Incumbent re-elected.	▌ ✓ Ron Dellums (Democratic) 66.6%; ▌John J. Cuddihy Jr. (Republican) 31.2%; ▌Tom Condit (Peace and Freedom) 2.2%
California 9	Pete Stark	Democratic	1972	Incumbent re-elected.	▌ ✓ Pete Stark (Democratic) 73%; ▌Howard Hertz (Republican) 27%
California 10	Don Edwards	Democratic	1972	Incumbent re-elected.	▌ ✓ Don Edwards (Democratic) 86.2%; ▌Kennita Watson (Libertarian) 13.8%
California 11	Tom Lantos	Democratic	1980	Incumbent re-elected.	▌ ✓ Tom Lantos (Democratic) 71%; ▌Bill Quraishi (Republican) 24.4%; ▌Bill Wade (Libertarian) 2.3%; ▌Victor Martinez (Peace and Freedom) 1.4%; ▌Nicholas W. Kudrovzeff (American Independent) 0.9%
California 12	Ernie Konnyu	Republican	1986	Incumbent lost renomination. Republican hold.	▌ ✓ Tom Campbell (Republican) 51.7%; ▌Anna Eshoo (Democratic) 46.0%; ▌Tom Grey (Libertarian) 2.3%
California 13	Norman Mineta	Democratic	1974	Incumbent re-elected.	▌ ✓ Norman Mineta (Democratic) 67.1%; ▌Luke Sommer (Republican) 29.8%; ▌John H. Webster (Libertarian) 3.1%
California 14	Norman D. Shumway	Republican	1978	Incumbent re-elected.	▌ ✓ Norman D. Shumway (Republican) 62.6%; ▌Patricia Malberg (Democratic) 37.4%
California 15	Tony Coelho	Democratic	1978	Incumbent re-elected.	▌ ✓ Tony Coelho (Democratic) 69.8%; ▌Carol Harner (Republican) 28.2%; ▌Richard M. Harris (Libertarian) 2.1%
California 16	Leon Panetta	Democratic	1976	Incumbent re-elected.	▌ ✓ Leon Panetta (Democratic) 78.6%; ▌Stanley Monteith (Republican) 21.4%
California 17	Chip Pashayan	Republican	1978	Incumbent re-elected.	▌ ✓ Chip Pashayan (Republican) 71.5%; ▌Vincent Lavery (Democratic) 28.5%
California 18	Richard H. Lehman	Democratic	1982	Incumbent re-elected.	▌ ✓ Richard H. Lehman (Democratic) 69.9%; ▌David A. Linn (Republican) 30.1%
California 19	Bob Lagomarsino	Republican	1974	Incumbent re-elected.	▌ ✓ Bob Lagomarsino (Republican) 50.2%; ▌Gary K. Hart (Democratic) 48.5%; ▌Robert Donaldson (Libertarian) 1.2%
California 20	Bill Thomas	Republican	1978	Incumbent re-elected.	▌ ✓ Bill Thomas (Republican) 71.1%; ▌Lita Reid (Democratic) 27.1%; ▌David Bersohn (Libertarian) 1.8%
California 21	Elton Gallegly	Republican	1986	Incumbent re-elected.	▌ ✓ Elton Gallegly (Republican) 69.1%; ▌Donald E. Stevens (Democratic) 28.8%; ▌Robert Jay (Libertarian) 2.1%
California 22	Carlos Moorhead	Republican	1972	Incumbent re-elected.	▌ ✓ Carlos Moorhead (Republican) 69.5%; ▌John G. Simmons (Democratic) 26%; ▌Shirley Rachel Isaacson (Peace and Freedom) 2.7%; ▌Ted Brown (Libertarian) 1.8%
California 23	Anthony Beilenson	Democratic	1976	Incumbent re-elected.	▌ ✓ Anthony Beilenson (Democratic) 63.5%; ▌Jim Salomon (Republican) 33.1%; ▌John Vernon (Libertarian) 1.9%; ▌John Honigsfeld (Peace and Freedom) 1.4%
California 24	Henry Waxman	Democratic	1974	Incumbent re-elected.	▌ ✓ Henry Waxman (Democratic) 72.2%; ▌John N. Cowles (Republican) 23.8%; ▌James Green (Peace and Freedom) 2.3%; ▌George Abrahams (Libertarian) 1.7%
California 25	Edward R. Roybal	Democratic	1962	Incumbent re-elected.	▌ ✓ Edward R. Roybal (Democratic) 85.5%; ▌Paul Reyes (Peace and Freedom) 8.8%; ▌John C. Thie (Libertarian) 5.8%
California 26	Howard Berman	Democratic	1982	Incumbent re-elected.	▌ ✓ Howard Berman (Democratic) 70.3%; ▌Brodie Broderson (Republican) 29.7%
California 27	Mel Levine	Democratic	1982	Incumbent re-elected.	▌ ✓ Mel Levine (Democratic) 67.5%; ▌Dennis Galbraith (Republican) 29.6%; ▌William J. Fulco (Libertarian) 2.8%
California 28	Julian Dixon	Democratic	1978	Incumbent re-elected.	▌ ✓ Julian Dixon (Democratic) 76.1%; ▌George Adams (Republican) 19.8%; ▌Howard Johnson (Libertarian) 2.1%; ▌Salomea Honigsfeld (Peace and Freedom) 1.9%
California 29	Augustus Hawkins	Democratic	1962	Incumbent re-elected.	▌ ✓ Augustus Hawkins (Democratic) 82.8%; ▌Reuben D. Franco (Republican) 13.7%; ▌Gregory P. Gilmore (Libertarian) 3.5%
California 30	Matthew G. Martínez	Democratic	1982	Incumbent re-elected.	▌ ✓ Matthew G. Martínez (Democratic) 59.9%; ▌Ralph R. Ramirez (Republican) 36.3%; ▌Houston Myers (American Independent) 2.2%; ▌Kim J. Goldsworthy (Libertarian) 1.5%
California 31	Mervyn Dymally	Democratic	1982	Incumbent re-elected.	▌ ✓ Mervyn Dymally (Democratic) 71.6%; ▌Arnold C. May (Republican) 25.5%; ▌B. Kwaku Duren (Peace and Freedom) 2.9%
California 32	Glenn M. Anderson	Democratic	1968	Incumbent re-elected.	▌ ✓ Glenn M. Anderson (Democratic) 66.9%; ▌Sanford W. Kahn (Republican) 29.6%; ▌Vikki Murdock (Peace and Freedom) 2.4%; ▌Marc F. Denny (Libertarian) 1.1%
California 33	David Dreier	Republican	1980	Incumbent re-elected.	▌ ✓ David Dreier (Republican) 69.2%; ▌Nelson Gentry (Democratic) 26.2%; ▌Gail Lightfoot (Libertarian) 3%; ▌Mike Noonan (Peace and Freedom) 1.6%
California 34	Esteban Torres	Democratic	1982	Incumbent re-elected.	▌ ✓ Esteban Torres (Democratic) 63.2%; ▌Charles M. House (Republican) 35.0%; ▌Carl M. Swinney (Libertarian) 1.8%
California 35	Jerry Lewis	Republican	1978	Incumbent re-elected.	▌ ✓ Jerry Lewis (Republican) 70.4%; ▌Paul Sweeney (Democratic) 27.7%; ▌Jeff Shuman (Libertarian) 1.9%
California 36	George Brown Jr.	Democratic	1962; 1970 (retired); 1972	Incumbent re-elected.	▌ ✓ George Brown Jr. (Democratic) 54%; ▌John Paul Stark (Republican) 42.5%; ▌Kenneth E. Valentine (Libertarian) 1.8%; ▌Fred L. Anderson (American Independent) 1.8%
California 37	Al McCandless	Republican	1982	Incumbent re-elected.	▌ ✓ Al McCandless (Republican) 64.3%; ▌Johnny Pearson (Democratic) 33.1%; ▌Bonnie Flickinger (Libertarian) 2.6%
California 38	Bob Dornan	Republican	1976; 1982 (retired); 1984	Incumbent re-elected.	▌ ✓ Bob Dornan (Republican) 59.5%; ▌Jerry Yudelson (Democratic) 35.6%; ▌Bruce McKay (Libertarian) 2.5%; ▌Frank German (Peace and Freedom) 2.4%
California 39	William Dannemeyer	Republican	1978	Incumbent re-elected.	▌ ✓ William Dannemeyer (Republican) 74%; ▌Don E. Marquis (Democratic) 22.8%; ▌Lee Connelly (Libertarian) 3.3%
California 40	Robert Badham	Republican	1976	Incumbent retired. Republican hold.	▌ ✓ Christopher Cox (Republican) 67.1%; ▌Lida Lenney (Democratic) 29.9%; ▌Roger Bloxham (Libertarian) 1.7%; ▌Gretchen J. Farsai (Peace and Freedom) 1.4%
California 41	Bill Lowery	Republican	1980	Incumbent re-elected.	▌ ✓ Bill Lowery (Republican) 64.8%; ▌Dan Kripke (Democratic) 31.5%; ▌Dick Rider (Libertarian) 1.9%; ▌C. T. Weber (Peace and Freedom) 1.7%
California 42	Dan Lungren	Republican	1978	Incumbent retired to become California State Treasurer. Republican hold.	▌ ✓ Dana Rohrabacher (Republican) 64.2%; ▌Guy C. Kimbrough (Democratic) 33%; ▌Richard D. Rose (Peace and Freedom) 2.8%
California 43	Ron Packard	Republican	1982	Incumbent re-elected.	▌ ✓ Ron Packard (Republican) 71.7%; ▌Howard Greenebaum (Democratic) 25.7%; ▌Daniel L. Muhe (Libertarian) 2.7%
California 44	Jim Bates	Democratic	1982	Incumbent re-elected.	▌ ✓ Jim Bates (Democratic) 59.7%; ▌Rob Butterfield (Republican) 36.5%; ▌Dennis Thompson (Libertarian) 3.8%
California 45	Duncan L. Hunter	Republican	1980	Incumbent re-elected.	▌ ✓ Duncan L. Hunter (Republican) 74.0%; ▌Pete Lepiscopo (Democratic) 24.0%; ▌Perry Willis (Libertarian) 2.0%

== Colorado ==
District	Incumbent	Party	First elected	Result	Candidates
Colorado 1	Pat Schroeder	Democratic	1972	Incumbent re-elected.	▌ ✓ Pat Schroeder (Democratic) 69.9%; ▌Joy Wood (Republican) 30.1%
Colorado 2	David Skaggs	Democratic	1986	Incumbent re-elected.	▌ ✓ David Skaggs (Democratic) 62.7%; ▌Dave Bath (Republican) 37.3%
Colorado 3	Ben Nighthorse Campbell	Democratic	1986	Incumbent re-elected.	▌ ✓ Ben Nighthorse Campbell (Democratic) 78.0%; ▌Jim Zartman (Republican) 22.0%
Colorado 4	Hank Brown	Republican	1980	Incumbent re-elected.	▌ ✓ Hank Brown (Republican) 73.1%; ▌Charles S. Vigil (Democratic) 26.9%
Colorado 5	Joel Hefley	Republican	1986	Incumbent re-elected.	▌ ✓ Joel Hefley (Republican) 75.1%; ▌John J. Mitchell (Democratic) 24.9%
Colorado 6	Daniel Schaefer	Republican	1983	Incumbent re-elected.	▌ ✓ Daniel Schaefer (Republican) 63.0%; ▌Martha Ezzard (Democratic) 35.6%; ▌John Heckman (Independent) 1.3%

== Connecticut ==
District	Incumbent	Party	First elected	Result	Candidates
Connecticut 1	Barbara B. Kennelly	Democratic	1982	Incumbent re-elected.	▌ ✓ Barbara B. Kennelly (Democratic) 77.2%; ▌Mario Robles Jr. (Republican) 22.8%
Connecticut 2	Sam Gejdenson	Democratic	1980	Incumbent re-elected.	▌ ✓ Sam Gejdenson (Democratic) 63.6%; ▌Glenn Carberry (Republican) 36.4%
Connecticut 3	Bruce Morrison	Democratic	1982	Incumbent re-elected.	▌ ✓ Bruce Morrison (Democratic) 66.5%; ▌Gerard B. Patton (Republican) 33.5%
Connecticut 4	Chris Shays	Republican	1987 (special)	Incumbent re-elected.	▌ ✓ Chris Shays (Republican) 71.8%; ▌Roger Pearson (Democratic) 27.1%; ▌Nicholas J. Tarzia (Independent) 1.2%
Connecticut 5	John G. Rowland	Republican	1984	Incumbent re-elected.	▌ ✓ John G. Rowland (Republican) 73.6%; ▌Joseph Marinan Jr. (Democratic) 26.4%
Connecticut 6	Nancy Johnson	Republican	1982	Incumbent re-elected.	▌ ✓ Nancy Johnson (Republican) 66.3%; ▌James L. Griffin (Democratic) 33.3%; ▌Louis J. Marietta (Independent) 0.4%

== Delaware ==
District	Incumbent	Party	First elected	Result	Candidates
Delaware at-large	Tom Carper	Democratic	1982	Incumbent re-elected.	▌ ✓ Tom Carper (Democratic) 67.5%; ▌James P. Krapf (Republican) 32.5%

== Florida ==
District	Incumbent	Party	First elected	Result	Candidates
Florida 1	Earl Hutto	Democratic	1978	Incumbent re-elected.	▌ ✓ Earl Hutto (Democratic) 66.9%; ▌E. D. Armbruster (Republican) 33.1%
Florida 2	Bill Grant	Democratic	1986	Incumbent re-elected.	▌ ✓ Bill Grant (Democratic) 99.7%
Florida 3	Charles E. Bennett	Democratic	1948	Incumbent re-elected.	▌ ✓ Charles E. Bennett (Democratic); Uncontested
Florida 4	Bill Chappell	Democratic	1968	Incumbent lost re-election. Republican gain.	▌ ✓ Craig James (Republican) 50.2%; ▌Bill Chappell (Democratic) 49.8%
Florida 5	Bill McCollum	Republican	1980	Incumbent re-elected.	▌ ✓ Bill McCollum (Republican); Uncontested
Florida 6	Buddy MacKay	Democratic	1982	Incumbent retired to run for U.S. Senator. Republican gain.	▌ ✓ Cliff Stearns (Republican) 53.5%; ▌Jon Mills (Democratic) 46.5%
Florida 7	Sam Gibbons	Democratic	1962	Incumbent re-elected.	▌ ✓ Sam Gibbons (Democratic); Uncontested
Florida 8	Bill Young	Republican	1970	Incumbent re-elected.	▌ ✓ Bill Young (Republican) 73.0%; ▌C. Bette Wimbish (Democratic) 27.0%
Florida 9	Michael Bilirakis	Republican	1982	Incumbent re-elected.	▌ ✓ Michael Bilirakis (Republican) 99.9%
Florida 10	Andy Ireland	Republican	1976	Incumbent re-elected.	▌ ✓ Andy Ireland (Republican) 73.5%; ▌David B. Higginbottom (Democratic) 26.5%
Florida 11	Bill Nelson	Democratic	1978	Incumbent re-elected.	▌ ✓ Bill Nelson (Democratic) 60.8%; ▌Bill Tolley (Republican) 39.2%
Florida 12	Tom Lewis	Republican	1982	Incumbent re-elected.	▌ ✓ Tom Lewis (Republican); Uncontested
Florida 13	Connie Mack III	Republican	1982	Incumbent retired to run for U.S. Senator. Republican hold.	▌ ✓ Porter Goss (Republican) 71.2%; ▌Jack Conway (Democratic) 28.8%
Florida 14	Dan Mica	Democratic	1978	Incumbent retired to run for U.S. Senator. Democratic hold.	▌ ✓ Harry Johnston (Democratic) 54.9%; ▌Ken Adams (Republican) 45.1%
Florida 15	Clay Shaw	Republican	1980	Incumbent re-elected.	▌ ✓ Clay Shaw (Republican) 66.1%; ▌Michael A. Kuhle (Democratic) 33.9%
Florida 16	Lawrence J. Smith	Democratic	1982	Incumbent re-elected.	▌ ✓ Lawrence J. Smith (Democratic) 69.4%; ▌Joseph Smith (Republican) 30.6%
Florida 17	William Lehman	Democratic	1972	Incumbent re-elected.	▌ ✓ William Lehman (Democratic); Uncontested
Florida 18	Claude Pepper	Democratic	1962	Incumbent re-elected.	▌ ✓ Claude Pepper (Democratic); Uncontested
Florida 19	Dante Fascell	Democratic	1954	Incumbent re-elected.	▌ ✓ Dante Fascell (Democratic) 72.4%; ▌Ralph Carlos Rocheteau (Republican) 27.6%

== Georgia ==
District	Incumbent	Party	First elected	Result	Candidates
Georgia 1	Lindsay Thomas	Democratic	1982	Incumbent re-elected.	▌ ✓ Lindsay Thomas (Democratic) 67.0%; ▌ Chris Meredith (Republican) 33.0%
Georgia 2	Charles Hatcher	Democratic	1980	Incumbent re-elected.	▌ ✓ Charles Hatcher (Democratic) 61.7%; ▌ Ralph Hudgens (Republican) 38.3%
Georgia 3	Richard Ray	Democratic	1982	Incumbent re-elected.	▌ ✓ Richard Ray (Democratic); Uncontested
Georgia 4	Pat Swindall	Republican	1984	Incumbent lost re-election. Democratic gain.	▌ ✓ Ben Jones (Democratic) 60.3%; ▌ Pat Swindall (Republican) 39.7%
Georgia 5	John Lewis	Democratic	1986	Incumbent re-elected.	▌ ✓ John Lewis (Democratic) 78.2%; ▌J. W. Tibbs (Republican) 21.8%
Georgia 6	Newt Gingrich	Republican	1978	Incumbent re-elected.	▌ ✓ Newt Gingrich (Republican) 58.9%; ▌David Worley (Democratic) 41.1%
Georgia 7	Buddy Darden	Democratic	1983 (special)	Incumbent re-elected.	▌ ✓ Buddy Darden (Democratic) 64.8%; ▌Robert Lamutt (Republican) 35.2%
Georgia 8	J. Roy Rowland	Democratic	1982	Incumbent re-elected.	▌ ✓ J. Roy Rowland (Democratic); Uncontested
Georgia 9	Ed Jenkins	Democratic	1976	Incumbent re-elected.	▌ ✓ Ed Jenkins (Democratic) 62.9%; ▌Joe Hoffman (Republican) 37.1%
Georgia 10	Doug Barnard Jr.	Democratic	1976	Incumbent re-elected.	▌ ✓ Doug Barnard Jr. (Democratic) 64.0%; ▌Mark Myers (Republican) 36.0%

Source: "N 1988 General Electionovember 8, 1988". Secretary of State of Georgia. Archived from the original on March 18, 2012.

== Hawaii ==
District	Incumbent	Party	First elected	Result	Candidates
Hawaii 1	Pat Saiki	Republican	1986	Incumbent re-elected.	▌ ✓ Pat Saiki (Republican) 54.7%; ▌Mary Bitterman (Democratic) 43.2%; ▌Blase Harris (Libertarian) 2.1%
Hawaii 2	Daniel Akaka	Democratic	1976	Incumbent re-elected.	▌ ✓ Daniel Akaka (Democratic) 88.9%; ▌Lloyd J. Mallan (Libertarian) 11.1%

== Idaho ==
District	Incumbent	Party	First elected	Result	Candidates
Idaho 1	Larry Craig	Republican	1980	Incumbent re-elected.	▌ ✓ Larry Craig (Republican) 65.8%; ▌Jeanne Givens (Democratic) 34.2%
Idaho 2	Richard H. Stallings	Democratic	1984	Incumbent re-elected.	▌ ✓ Richard H. Stallings (Democratic) 63.4%; ▌Dane Watkins (Republican) 33.8%; ▌Donovan Bramwell (Libertarian) 2.8%

== Illinois ==
District	Incumbent	Party	First elected	Result	Candidates
Illinois 1	Charles Hayes	Democratic	1983 (special)	Incumbent re-elected.	▌ ✓ Charles Hayes (Democratic) 96.0%; ▌Stephen J. Evans (Republican) 4.0%
Illinois 2	Gus Savage	Democratic	1980	Incumbent re-elected.	▌ ✓ Gus Savage (Democratic) 82.7%; ▌William T. Hespel (Republican) 17.3%
Illinois 3	Marty Russo	Democratic	1974	Incumbent re-elected.	▌ ✓ Marty Russo (Democratic) 62.2%; ▌Joseph J. McCarthy (Republican) 37.8%
Illinois 4	Jack Davis	Republican	1986	Incumbent lost re-election. Democratic gain.	▌ ✓ George E. Sangmeister (Democratic) 50.3%; ▌Jack Davis (Republican) 49.7%
Illinois 5	Bill Lipinski	Democratic	1982	Incumbent re-elected.	▌ ✓ Bill Lipinski (Democratic) 61.3%; ▌John J. Holowinski (Republican) 38.7%
Illinois 6	Henry Hyde	Republican	1974	Incumbent re-elected.	▌ ✓ Henry Hyde (Republican) 73.7%; ▌William J. Andrle (Democratic) 26.3%
Illinois 7	Cardiss Collins	Democratic	1973 (special)	Incumbent re-elected.	▌ ✓ Cardiss Collins (Democratic); Uncontested
Illinois 8	Dan Rostenkowski	Democratic	1958	Incumbent re-elected.	▌ ✓ Dan Rostenkowski (Democratic) 74.6%; ▌V. Stephen Vetter (Republican) 24.0%; ▌Mark J. Almberg (Communist) 1.3%
Illinois 9	Sidney R. Yates	Democratic	1948; 1962 (retired); 1964	Incumbent re-elected.	▌ ✓ Sidney R. Yates (Democratic) 66.1%; ▌Herbert Sohn (Republican) 32.9%; ▌Jessie Fields (Solidarity) 1.0%
Illinois 10	John Porter	Republican	1980	Incumbent re-elected.	▌ ✓ John Porter (Republican) 72.5%; ▌Eugene F. Friedman (Democratic) 27.5%
Illinois 11	Frank Annunzio	Democratic	1964	Incumbent re-elected.	▌ ✓ Frank Annunzio (Democratic) 64.5%; ▌George S. Gottlieb (Republican) 35.5%
Illinois 12	Phil Crane	Republican	1969 (special)	Incumbent re-elected.	▌ ✓ Phil Crane (Republican) 75.2%; ▌John A. Leonardi (Democratic) 24.8%
Illinois 13	Harris Fawell	Republican	1984	Incumbent re-elected.	▌ ✓ Harris Fawell (Republican) 70.2%; ▌Evelyn E. Craig (Democratic) 29.8%
Illinois 14	Dennis Hastert	Republican	1986	Incumbent re-elected.	▌ ✓ Dennis Hastert (Republican) 73.7%; ▌Stephen Youhanaie (Democratic) 26.3%
Illinois 15	Ed Madigan	Republican	1972	Incumbent re-elected.	▌ ✓ Ed Madigan (Republican) 71.7%; ▌Thomas J. Curl (Democratic) 28.3%
Illinois 16	Lynn M. Martin	Republican	1980	Incumbent re-elected.	▌ ✓ Lynn M. Martin (Republican) 63.9%; ▌Steven E. Mahan (Democratic) 36.1%
Illinois 17	Lane Evans	Democratic	1982	Incumbent re-elected.	▌ ✓ Lane Evans (Democratic) 64.9%; ▌William E. Stewart (Republican) 35.1%
Illinois 18	Robert H. Michel	Republican	1956	Incumbent re-elected.	▌ ✓ Robert H. Michel (Republican) 54.7%; ▌G. Douglas Stephens (Democratic) 45.3%
Illinois 19	Terry L. Bruce	Democratic	1984	Incumbent re-elected.	▌ ✓ Terry L. Bruce (Democratic) 64.2%; ▌Robert F. Kerans (Republican) 35.8%
Illinois 20	Dick Durbin	Democratic	1982	Incumbent re-elected.	▌ ✓ Dick Durbin (Democratic) 68.9%; ▌Paul E. Jurgens (Republican) 31.1%
Illinois 21	Jerry Costello	Democratic	1988	Incumbent re-elected.	▌ ✓ Jerry Costello (Democratic) 52.6%; ▌Bob Gaffner (Republican) 47.4%
Illinois 22	Kenneth J. Gray	Democratic	1954; 1974 (retired); 1984	Incumbent retired. Democratic hold.	▌ ✓ Glenn Poshard (Democratic) 64.9%; ▌Patrick J. Kelley (Republican) 35.1%

== Indiana ==
District	Incumbent	Party	First elected	Result	Candidates
Indiana 1	Pete Visclosky	Democratic	1984	Incumbent re-elected.	▌ ✓ Pete Visclosky (Democratic) 77.1%; ▌Owen W. Crumpacker (Republican) 22.9%
Indiana 2	Philip Sharp	Democratic	1974	Incumbent re-elected.	▌ ✓ Philip Sharp (Democratic) 53.2%; ▌Mike Pence (Republican) 46.8%
Indiana 3	John P. Hiler	Republican	1980	Incumbent re-elected.	▌ ✓ John P. Hiler (Republican) 54.3%; ▌Thomas W. Ward (Democratic) 45.7%
Indiana 4	Dan Coats	Republican	1980	Incumbent re-elected.	▌ ✓ Dan Coats (Republican) 62.1%; ▌Jill Long (Democratic) 37.9%
Indiana 5	Jim Jontz	Democratic	1986	Incumbent re-elected.	▌ ✓ Jim Jontz (Democratic) 56.3%; ▌Patricia L. Williams (Republican) 43.7%
Indiana 6	Dan Burton	Republican	1982	Incumbent re-elected.	▌ ✓ Dan Burton (Republican) 72.9%; ▌George T. Holland (Democratic) 27.1%
Indiana 7	John T. Myers	Republican	1966	Incumbent re-elected.	▌ ✓ John T. Myers (Republican) 61.8%; ▌Mark R. Waterfill (Democratic) 38.2%
Indiana 8	Frank McCloskey	Democratic	1982	Incumbent re-elected.	▌ ✓ Frank McCloskey (Democratic) 61.8%; ▌John L. Myers (Republican) 38.2%
Indiana 9	Lee H. Hamilton	Democratic	1964	Incumbent re-elected.	▌ ✓ Lee H. Hamilton (Democratic) 70.7%; ▌Floyd E. Coates (Republican) 29.3%
Indiana 10	Andrew Jacobs Jr.	Democratic	1964; 1972 (defeated); 1974	Incumbent re-elected.	▌ ✓ Andrew Jacobs Jr. (Democratic) 60.5%; ▌James C. Cummings (Republican) 39.5%

== Iowa ==
District	Incumbent	Party	First elected	Result	Candidates
Iowa 1	Jim Leach	Republican	1976	Incumbent re-elected.	▌ ✓ Jim Leach (Republican) 60.7%; ▌Bill Gluba (Democratic) 38.4%; ▌Judy Stav-River (Independent) 0.9%
Iowa 2	Tom Tauke	Republican	1978	Incumbent re-elected.	▌ ✓ Tom Tauke (Republican) 56.8%; ▌Eric Tabor (Democratic) 43.2%
Iowa 3	David R. Nagle	Democratic	1986	Incumbent re-elected.	▌ ✓ David R. Nagle (Democratic) 63.4%; ▌Donald B. Redfern (Republican) 36.6%
Iowa 4	Neal Smith	Democratic	1958	Incumbent re-elected.	▌ ✓ Neal Smith (Democratic) 71.7%; ▌Paul Lunde (Republican) 28.3%
Iowa 5	Jim Ross Lightfoot	Republican	1984	Incumbent re-elected.	▌ ✓ Jim Ross Lightfoot (Republican) 63.9%; ▌Gene Freund (Democratic) 36.1%
Iowa 6	Fred Grandy	Republican	1986	Incumbent re-elected.	▌ ✓ Fred Grandy (Republican) 64.4%; ▌Dave O'Brien (Democratic) 35.6%

== Kansas ==
District	Incumbent	Party	First elected	Result	Candidates
Kansas 1	Pat Roberts	Republican	1980	Incumbent re-elected.	▌ ✓ Pat Roberts (Republican) 100%
Kansas 2	Jim Slattery	Democratic	1982	Incumbent re-elected.	▌ ✓ Jim Slattery (Democratic) 73.3%; ▌Phil Meinhardt (Republican) 26.7%
Kansas 3	Jan Meyers	Republican	1984	Incumbent re-elected.	▌ ✓ Jan Meyers (Republican) 73.6%; ▌Lionel Kunst (Democratic) 26.4%
Kansas 4	Dan Glickman	Democratic	1976	Incumbent re-elected.	▌ ✓ Dan Glickman (Democratic) 64.0%; ▌Lee Thompson (Republican) 36.0%
Kansas 5	Bob Whittaker	Republican	1978	Incumbent re-elected.	▌ ✓ Bob Whittaker (Republican) 70.2%; ▌John A. Barnes (Democratic) 29.8%

== Kentucky ==
District	Incumbent	Party	First elected	Result	Candidates
Kentucky 1	Carroll Hubbard	Democratic	1974	Incumbent re-elected.	▌ ✓ Carroll Hubbard (Democratic) 95.1%; ▌Charles K. Hatchett (Independent) 4.9%
Kentucky 2	William Natcher	Democratic	1953 (special)	Incumbent re-elected.	▌ ✓ William Natcher (Democratic) 60.6%; ▌Martin A. Tori (Republican) 39.4%
Kentucky 3	Romano Mazzoli	Democratic	1970	Incumbent re-elected.	▌ ✓ Romano Mazzoli (Democratic) 69.7%; ▌Philip Dunnagan (Republican) 30.3%
Kentucky 4	Jim Bunning	Republican	1986	Incumbent re-elected.	▌ ✓ Jim Bunning (Republican) 74.2%; ▌Richard V. Beliles (Democratic) 25.8%
Kentucky 5	Hal Rogers	Republican	1980	Incumbent re-elected.	▌ ✓ Hal Rogers (Republican); Uncontested
Kentucky 6	Larry J. Hopkins	Republican	1978	Incumbent re-elected.	▌ ✓ Larry J. Hopkins (Republican) 74.0%; ▌Milton Patton (Democratic) 26.0%
Kentucky 7	Chris Perkins	Democratic	1984	Incumbent re-elected.	▌ ✓ Chris Perkins (Democratic) 58.7%; ▌Will T. Scott (Republican) 41.3%

== Louisiana ==
District	Incumbent	Party	First elected	Result	Candidates
Louisiana 1	Bob Livingston	Republican	1977 (special)	Incumbent re-elected.	▌ ✓ Bob Livingston (Republican) 78.5%; ▌George Mustakas (Democratic) 15.2%; ▌Eric Honig (Democratic) 6.3%
Louisiana 2	Lindy Boggs	Democratic	1973 (special)	Incumbent re-elected.	▌ ✓ Lindy Boggs (Democratic) 89.5%; ▌Roger C. Johnson (Republican) 10.5%
Louisiana 3	Billy Tauzin	Democratic	1980	Incumbent re-elected.	▌ ✓ Billy Tauzin (Democratic) 89.3%; ▌Millard Clement (Democratic) 10.7%
Louisiana 4	Jim McCrery	Republican	1988 (special)	Incumbent re-elected.	▌ ✓ Jim McCrery (Republican) 68.6%; ▌Adeline Roemer (Democratic) 26.6%; ▌Bob Briggs (Democratic) 4.8%
Louisiana 5	Jerry Huckaby	Democratic	1976	Incumbent re-elected.	▌ ✓ Jerry Huckaby (Democratic) 71.1%; ▌Jack Wright (Democratic) 20.0%; ▌Bradley T. Roark (Republican) 8.9%
Louisiana 6	Richard Baker	Republican	1986	Incumbent re-elected.	▌ ✓ Richard Baker (Republican); Uncontested
Louisiana 7	Jimmy Hayes	Democratic	1986	Incumbent re-elected.	▌ ✓ Jimmy Hayes (Democratic); Uncontested
Louisiana 8	Clyde C. Holloway	Republican	1986	Incumbent re-elected.	▌ ✓ Clyde C. Holloway (Republican) 56.8%; ▌Faye Williams (Democratic) 43.2%

== Maine ==
District	Incumbent	Party	First elected	Result	Candidates
Maine 1	Joseph E. Brennan	Democratic	1986	Incumbent re-elected.	▌ ✓ Joseph E. Brennan (Democratic) 63.2%; ▌Edward S. O'Meara (Republican) 36.8%
Maine 2	Olympia Snowe	Republican	1978	Incumbent re-elected.	▌ ✓ Olympia Snowe (Republican) 66.2%; ▌Kenneth P. Hayes (Democratic) 33.8%

== Maryland ==
District	Incumbent	Party	First elected	Result	Candidates
Maryland 1	Roy Dyson	Democratic	1980	Incumbent re-elected.	▌ ✓ Roy Dyson (Democratic) 50.4%; ▌Wayne Gilchrest (Republican) 49.6%
Maryland 2	Helen Delich Bentley	Republican	1984	Incumbent re-elected.	▌ ✓ Helen Delich Bentley (Republican) 71.5%; ▌Joseph Bartenfelder (Democratic) 28.5%
Maryland 3	Ben Cardin	Democratic	1986	Incumbent re-elected.	▌ ✓ Ben Cardin (Democratic) 72.9%; ▌Ross Z. Pierpont (Republican) 27.1%
Maryland 4	Tom McMillen	Democratic	1986	Incumbent re-elected.	▌ ✓ Tom McMillen (Democratic) 68.3%; ▌Bradlyn McClanahan (Republican) 31.7%
Maryland 5	Steny Hoyer	Democratic	1981 (special)	Incumbent re-elected.	▌ ✓ Steny Hoyer (Democratic) 78.6%; ▌John Eugene Sellner (Republican) 21.4%
Maryland 6	Beverly Byron	Democratic	1978	Incumbent re-elected.	▌ ✓ Beverly Byron (Democratic) 75.4%; ▌Kenneth W. Halsey (Republican) 24.6%
Maryland 7	Kweisi Mfume	Democratic	1986	Incumbent re-elected.	▌ ✓ Kweisi Mfume (Democratic); Uncontested
Maryland 8	Connie Morella	Republican	1986	Incumbent re-elected.	▌ ✓ Connie Morella (Republican) 62.7%; ▌Peter Franchot (Democratic) 37.3%

== Massachusetts ==
District	Incumbent	Party	First elected	Result	Candidates
Massachusetts 1	Silvio O. Conte	Republican	1958	Incumbent re-elected.	▌ ✓ Silvio O. Conte (Republican) 82.7%; ▌John R. Arden (Democratic) 17.3%
Massachusetts 2	Edward Boland	Democratic	1952	Incumbent retired. Democratic hold.	▌ ✓ Richard Neal (Democratic) 80.3%; ▌Louis R. Godena (Independent) 19.7%
Massachusetts 3	Joseph D. Early	Democratic	1974	Incumbent re-elected.	▌ ✓ Joseph D. Early (Democratic); Uncontested
Massachusetts 4	Barney Frank	Democratic	1980	Incumbent re-elected.	▌ ✓ Barney Frank (Democratic) 70.3%; ▌Debra R. Tucker (Republican) 29.7%
Massachusetts 5	Chester G. Atkins	Democratic	1984	Incumbent re-elected.	▌ ✓ Chester G. Atkins (Democratic) 84.1%; ▌T. David Hudson (Libertarian) 15.9%
Massachusetts 6	Nicholas Mavroules	Democratic	1978	Incumbent re-elected.	▌ ✓ Nicholas Mavroules (Democratic) 69.7%; ▌Paul McCarthy (Republican) 30.3%
Massachusetts 7	Ed Markey	Democratic	1976	Incumbent re-elected.	▌ ✓ Ed Markey (Democratic); Uncontested
Massachusetts 8	Joseph P. Kennedy II	Democratic	1986	Incumbent re-elected.	▌ ✓ Joseph P. Kennedy II (Democratic) 80.4%; ▌Glenn W. Fiscus (Republican) 19.6%
Massachusetts 9	Joe Moakley	Democratic	1972	Incumbent re-elected.	▌ ✓ Joe Moakley (Democratic); Uncontested
Massachusetts 10	Gerry Studds	Democratic	1972	Incumbent re-elected.	▌ ✓ Gerry Studds (Democratic) 66.7%; ▌Jon L. Bryan (Republican) 33.3%
Massachusetts 11	Brian J. Donnelly	Democratic	1978	Incumbent re-elected.	▌ ✓ Brian J. Donnelly (Democratic) 80.8%; ▌Michael C. Gilleran (Republican) 19.2%

== Michigan ==
District	Incumbent	Party	First elected	Result	Candidates
Michigan 1	John Conyers	Democratic	1964	Incumbent re-elected.	▌ ✓ John Conyers (Democratic) 91.2%; ▌Bill Ashe (Republican) 7.8%; Others: ▌Jonathan Paul Flint (Libertarian) 0.5%; ▌Sam Johnson (WAC) 0.4%
Michigan 2	Carl Pursell	Republican	1976	Incumbent re-elected.	▌ ✓ Carl Pursell (Republican) 54.7%; ▌Lana Pollack (Democratic) 44.7%; ▌David Raaflaub (Libertarian) 0.6%
Michigan 3	Howard Wolpe	Democratic	1978	Incumbent re-elected.	▌ ✓ Howard Wolpe (Democratic) 57.3%; ▌Cal Allgaier (Republican) 42.7%
Michigan 4	Fred Upton	Republican	1986	Incumbent re-elected.	▌ ✓ Fred Upton (Republican) 70.8%; ▌Norman Rivers (Democratic) 29.2%
Michigan 5	Paul B. Henry	Republican	1984	Incumbent re-elected.	▌ ✓ Paul B. Henry (Republican) 72.6%; ▌James Catchick (Democratic) 27.4%
Michigan 6	Bob Carr	Democratic	1974; 1980 (defeated); 1982	Incumbent re-elected.	▌ ✓ Bob Carr (Democratic) 58.9%; ▌Scott Schultz (Republican) 39.6%; Others: ▌Tony Wright (Libertarian) 0.9%; ▌Judith Christensen (WAC) 0.5%
Michigan 7	Dale Kildee	Democratic	1976	Incumbent re-elected.	▌ ✓ Dale Kildee (Democratic) 75.8%; ▌Jeff Coad (Republican) 23.6%; ▌Gary Walkowicz (WAC) 0.6%
Michigan 8	J. Bob Traxler	Democratic	1974	Incumbent re-elected.	▌ ✓ J. Bob Traxler (Democratic) 72.1%; ▌Lloyd F. Buhl (Republican) 27.9%
Michigan 9	Guy Vander Jagt	Republican	1966	Incumbent re-elected.	▌ ✓ Guy Vander Jagt (Republican) 69.8%; ▌David John Gawron (Democratic) 30.2%
Michigan 10	Bill Schuette	Republican	1984	Incumbent re-elected.	▌ ✓ Bill Schuette (Republican) 72.7%; ▌Mathias G. Forbes (Democratic) 26.4%; ▌Gary R. Bradley (Libertarian) 0.9%
Michigan 11	Bob Davis	Republican	1978	Incumbent re-elected.	▌ ✓ Bob Davis (Republican) 59.6%; ▌Mitch Irwin (Democratic) 40.0%; ▌Denise Kline (Libertarian) 0.4%
Michigan 12	David Bonior	Democratic	1976	Incumbent re-elected.	▌ ✓ David Bonior (Democratic) 53.6%; ▌Douglas Carl (Republican) 45.5%; Others: ▌Keith P. Edwards (Libertarian) 0.6%; ▌Vincent Mario Contrera (WAC) 0.3%
Michigan 13	George Crockett Jr.	Democratic	1980	Incumbent re-elected.	▌ ✓ George Crockett Jr. (Democratic) 87.0%; ▌John W. Savage II (Republican) 11.5%; Others: ▌Alan H. Harris (Libertarian) 0.8%; ▌Martinez Alfred Gomez (WAC) 0.8%
Michigan 14	Dennis Hertel	Democratic	1980	Incumbent re-elected.	▌ ✓ Dennis Hertel (Democratic) 62.6%; ▌Kenneth C. McNealy (Republican) 36.3%; Others: ▌Robert W. Roddis (Libertarian) 0.7%; ▌James L. Breeland (WAC) 0.4%
Michigan 15	William D. Ford	Democratic	1964	Incumbent re-elected.	▌ ✓ William D. Ford (Democratic) 63.8%; ▌Burl C. Adkins (Republican) 34.8%; ▌Eric Blankenburg (Libertarian) 1.0%; ▌Ronda M. Reed Bell (WAC) 0.4%
Michigan 16	John Dingell	Democratic	1955 (special)	Incumbent re-elected.	▌ ✓ John Dingell (Democratic) 97.4%; ▌Russell W. Leone (WAC) 2.6%
Michigan 17	Sander Levin	Democratic	1982	Incumbent re-elected.	▌ ✓ Sander Levin (Democratic) 70.2%; ▌Dennis M. Flessland (Republican) 28.6%; ▌Charles Hahn (Libertarian) 1.2%
Michigan 18	William Broomfield	Republican	1956	Incumbent re-elected.	▌ ✓ William Broomfield (Republican) 76.0%; ▌Gary L. Kohut (Democratic) 22.4%; ▌Timothy J. O'Brien (Libertarian) 1.6%

== Minnesota ==
District	Incumbent	Party	First elected	Result	Candidates
Minnesota 1	Tim Penny	DFL	1982	Incumbent re-elected.	▌ ✓ Tim Penny (DFL) 70.1%; ▌Curt Schrimpf (Ind.-Republican) 29.5%; ▌Craig Honts (Socialist Workers) 0.4%
Minnesota 2	Vin Weber	Independent- Republican	1980	Incumbent re-elected.	▌ ✓ Vin Weber (Ind.-Republican) 57.8%; ▌Doug Peterson (DFL) 42.2%
Minnesota 3	Bill Frenzel	Independent- Republican	1970	Incumbent re-elected.	▌ ✓ Bill Frenzel (Ind.-Republican) 68.2%; ▌Dave Carlson (DFL) 31.6%
Minnesota 4	Bruce Vento	DFL	1976	Incumbent re-elected.	▌ ✓ Bruce Vento (DFL) 72.4%; ▌Ian Maitland (Ind.-Republican) 26.8%; ▌Natasha Terlexis (Socialist Workers) 0.7%
Minnesota 5	Martin Olav Sabo	DFL	1978	Incumbent re-elected.	▌ ✓ Martin Olav Sabo (DFL) 72.1%; ▌Raymond C. Gilbertson (Ind.-Republican) 25.1%; ▌Chris Wright (Grassroots) 2.7%
Minnesota 6	Gerry Sikorski	DFL	1982	Incumbent re-elected.	▌ ✓ Gerry Sikorski (DFL) 65.4%; ▌Ray Ploetz (Ind.-Republican) 34.4%
Minnesota 7	Arlan Stangeland	Independent- Republican	1977 (special)	Incumbent re-elected.	▌ ✓ Arlan Stangeland (Ind.-Republican) 54.6%; ▌Marv Hanson (DFL) 45.4%
Minnesota 8	Jim Oberstar	DFL	1974	Incumbent re-elected.	▌ ✓ Jim Oberstar (DFL) 74.5%; ▌Jerry Shuster (Ind.-Republican) 25.5%

== Mississippi ==
District	Incumbent	Party	First elected	Result	Candidates
Mississippi 1	Jamie Whitten	Democratic	1941 (special)	Incumbent re-elected.	▌ ✓ Jamie Whitten (Democratic) 78.2%; ▌Jim Bush (Republican) 21.8%
Mississippi 2	Mike Espy	Democratic	1986	Incumbent re-elected.	▌ ✓ Mike Espy (Democratic) 64.7%; ▌Jack Coleman (Republican) 34.5%; ▌Dorothy Benford (Independent) 0.8%
Mississippi 3	Sonny Montgomery	Democratic	1966	Incumbent re-elected.	▌ ✓ Sonny Montgomery (Democratic) 93.9%; ▌Jimmie Ray Bourland (Republican) 6.1%
Mississippi 4	Wayne Dowdy	Democratic	1981 (special)	Incumbent retired to run for U.S. Senator. Democratic hold.	▌ ✓ Michael Parker (Democratic) 54.8%; ▌Thomas Collins (Republican) 44.0%; ▌Liz Gilchrist (Independent) 1.2%
Mississippi 5	Trent Lott	Republican	1972	Incumbent retired to run for U.S. Senator. Republican hold.	▌ ✓ Larkin I. Smith (Republican) 55.0%; ▌Gene Taylor (Democratic) 45.0%

== Missouri ==
District	Incumbent	Party	First elected	Result	Candidates
Missouri 1	Bill Clay	Democratic	1968	Incumbent re-elected.	▌ ✓ Bill Clay (Democratic) 71.6%; ▌Joseph A. Schwan (Republican) 27.0%; ▌Terry Inman (Libertarian) 1.4%
Missouri 2	Jack Buechner	Republican	1986	Incumbent re-elected.	▌ ✓ Jack Buechner (Republican) 66.3%; ▌Robert H. Feigenbaum (Democratic) 32.6%; ▌Deania Lohmann (Libertarian) 1.1%
Missouri 3	Dick Gephardt	Democratic	1976	Incumbent re-elected.	▌ ✓ Dick Gephardt (Democratic) 62.8%; ▌Mark F. Hearne (Republican) 36.3%; ▌Lloyd Sloan (Libertarian) 0.9%
Missouri 4	Ike Skelton	Democratic	1976	Incumbent re-elected.	▌ ✓ Ike Skelton (Democratic) 71.8%; ▌David Eyerly (Republican) 28.2%
Missouri 5	Alan Wheat	Democratic	1982	Incumbent re-elected.	▌ ✓ Alan Wheat (Democratic) 70.3%; ▌Mary Ellen Lobb (Republican) 28.5%; ▌Mike Hurley (Libertarian) 1.2%
Missouri 6	Tom Coleman	Republican	1976	Incumbent re-elected.	▌ ✓ Tom Coleman (Republican) 59.3%; ▌Doug R. Hughes (Democratic) 40.7%
Missouri 7	Gene Taylor	Republican	1972	Incumbent retired. Republican hold.	▌ ✓ Mel Hancock (Republican) 53.1%; ▌Max Bacon (Democratic) 46.2%; ▌Rob Lurvey (Libertarian) 0.7%
Missouri 8	Bill Emerson	Republican	1980	Incumbent re-elected.	▌ ✓ Bill Emerson (Republican) 58.1%; ▌Wayne Cryts (Democratic) 41.9%
Missouri 9	Harold Volkmer	Democratic	1976	Incumbent re-elected.	▌ ✓ Harold Volkmer (Democratic) 67.9%; ▌Ken Dudley (Republican) 32.1%

== Montana ==
District	Incumbent	Party	First elected	Result	Candidates
Montana 1	Pat Williams	Democratic	1978	Incumbent re-elected.	▌ ✓ Pat Williams (Democratic) 60.8%; ▌Jim Fenlason (Republican) 39.2%
Montana 2	Ron Marlenee	Republican	1976	Incumbent re-elected.	▌ ✓ Ron Marlenee (Republican) 55.5%; ▌Buck O'Brien (Democratic) 44.5%

== Nebraska ==
District	Incumbent	Party	First elected	Result	Candidates
Nebraska 1	Doug Bereuter	Republican	1978	Incumbent re-elected.	▌ ✓ Doug Bereuter (Republican) 67.0%; ▌Corky Jones (Democratic) 33.0%
Nebraska 2	Hal Daub	Republican	1980	Incumbent retired to run for U.S. Senator. Democratic gain.	▌ ✓ Peter Hoagland (Democratic) 50.7%; ▌Jerry Schenken (Republican) 49.3%
Nebraska 3	Virginia D. Smith	Republican	1974	Incumbent re-elected.	▌ ✓ Virginia D. Smith (Republican) 79.0%; ▌John D. Racek (Democratic) 21.0%

== Nevada ==
District	Incumbent	Party	First elected	Result	Candidates
Nevada 1	James Bilbray	Democratic	1986	Incumbent re-elected.	▌ ✓ James Bilbray (Democratic) 64.0%; ▌Lucille Lusk (Republican) 33.7%; ▌Patrick O'Neill (Libertarian) 2.3%
Nevada 2	Barbara Vucanovich	Republican	1982	Incumbent re-elected.	▌ ✓ Barbara Vucanovich (Republican) 57.3%; ▌Jim Spoo (Democratic) 40.6%; ▌Kent Cromwell (Libertarian) 2.1%

== New Hampshire ==
District	Incumbent	Party	First elected	Result	Candidates
New Hampshire 1	Bob Smith	Republican	1984	Incumbent re-elected.	▌ ✓ Bob Smith (Republican) 60.3%; ▌Joseph F. Keefe (Democratic) 39.7%
New Hampshire 2	Judd Gregg	Republican	1980	Incumbent retired to run for Governor of New Hampshire. Republican hold.	▌ ✓ Chuck Douglas (Republican) 56.8%; ▌James W. Donchess (Democratic) 42.5%; ▌Roy Kendel (Independent) 0.7%

== New Jersey ==
District	Incumbent	Party	First elected	Result	Candidates
New Jersey 1	James Florio	Democratic	1974	Incumbent re-elected.	▌ ✓ James Florio (Democratic) 69.9%; ▌Frank A. Cristaudo (Republican) 29.6%; ▌Richard Bartucci (Libertarian) 0.6%
New Jersey 2	William J. Hughes	Democratic	1974	Incumbent re-elected.	▌ ✓ William J. Hughes (Democratic) 65.7%; ▌Kirk W. Conover (Republican) 33.1%; ▌Richard A. Schindewolf Jr. (Pro-Life) 1.2%
New Jersey 3	James J. Howard	Democratic	1964	Incumbent died. Democratic hold. Winner was also elected to finish the current term; see above.	▌ ✓ Frank Pallone (Democratic) 51.6%; ▌Joseph Azzolina (Republican) 47.4%; ▌Laura Stewart (Libertarian) 0.9%
New Jersey 4	Chris Smith	Republican	1980	Incumbent re-elected.	▌ ✓ Chris Smith (Republican) 65.7%; ▌Betty Holland (Democratic) 33.4%; Others: ▌Judson M. Carter (Independent) 0.5%; ▌Daniel A. Maiullo Jr. (Libertarian) 0.3%
New Jersey 5	Marge Roukema	Republican	1980	Incumbent re-elected.	▌ ✓ Marge Roukema (Republican) 75.7%; ▌Lee Monaco (Democratic) 23.6%; ▌Daniel M. Karlan (Libertarian) 0.7%
New Jersey 6	Bernard J. Dwyer	Democratic	1980	Incumbent re-elected.	▌ ✓ Bernard J. Dwyer (Democratic) 61.1%; ▌Peter J. Sica (Republican) 38.1%; Others: ▌Joan Paltrineri (Socialist Workers) 0.5%; ▌Howard F. Schoen (Libertarian) 0.3%
New Jersey 7	Matthew J. Rinaldo	Republican	1972	Incumbent re-elected.	▌ ✓ Matthew J. Rinaldo (Republican) 74.6%; ▌James Hely (Democratic) 25.4%
New Jersey 8	Robert A. Roe	Democratic	1970	Incumbent re-elected.	▌ ✓ Robert A. Roe (Democratic); Uncontested
New Jersey 9	Robert Torricelli	Democratic	1982	Incumbent re-elected.	▌ ✓ Robert Torricelli (Democratic) 67.1%; ▌Roger J. Lane (Republican) 32.3%; ▌Richard J. Kemly (Independent) 0.5%
New Jersey 10	Peter W. Rodino	Democratic	1948	Incumbent retired. Democratic hold.	▌ ✓ Donald M. Payne (Democratic) 77.4%; ▌Michael Webb (Republican) 12.6%; ▌Anthony Imperiale (Independent) 5.0%; ▌Mindy Birdno (Socialist Workers) 4.1%; Others: ▌Alvin Curtis (Independent) 0.5%; ▌Alan Bowser (Independent) 0.4%
New Jersey 11	Dean Gallo	Republican	1984	Incumbent re-elected.	▌ ✓ Dean Gallo (Republican) 70.5%; ▌John C. Shaw (Democratic) 29.5%
New Jersey 12	Jim Courter	Republican	1978	Incumbent re-elected.	▌ ✓ Jim Courter (Republican) 69.3%; ▌Norman J. Weinstein (Democratic) 29.9%; ▌Stephen Friedlander (Libertarian) 0.8%
New Jersey 13	Jim Saxton	Republican	1984	Incumbent re-elected.	▌ ✓ Jim Saxton (Republican) 69.5%; ▌James B. Smith (Democratic) 30.5%
New Jersey 14	Frank J. Guarini	Democratic	1978	Incumbent re-elected.	▌ ✓ Frank J. Guarini (Democratic) 67.3%; ▌Fred J. Theemling Jr. (Republican) 30.6%; Others: ▌John A. Jones (Independent) 0.9%; ▌Christopher White (Libertarian) 0.7%; ▌John Rummel (Communist) 0.3%; ▌Peter Galbo (Independent) 0.2%

== New Mexico ==
District	Incumbent	Party	First elected	Result	Candidates
New Mexico 1	Manuel Lujan Jr.	Republican	1968	Incumbent retired. Republican hold.	▌ ✓ Steven Schiff (Republican) 50.6%; ▌Tom Udall (Democratic) 47.3%; ▌Allen M. Parkman (Libertarian) 2.2%
New Mexico 2	Joe Skeen	Republican	1980	Incumbent re-elected.	▌ ✓ Joe Skeen (Republican); Uncontested
New Mexico 3	Bill Richardson	Democratic	1982	Incumbent re-elected.	▌ ✓ Bill Richardson (Democratic) 73.1%; ▌Cecilia M. Salazar (Republican) 26.9%

== New York ==
District	Incumbent	Party	First elected	Result	Candidates
New York 1	George J. Hochbrueckner	Democratic	1986	Incumbent re-elected.	▌ ✓ George J. Hochbrueckner (Democratic) 50.8%; ▌Edward P. Romaine (Republican) 49.2%
New York 2	Thomas Downey	Democratic	1974	Incumbent re-elected.	▌ ✓ Thomas Downey (Democratic) 61.6%; ▌Joseph Cardino Jr. (Republican) 38.4%
New York 3	Robert J. Mrazek	Democratic	1982	Incumbent re-elected.	▌ ✓ Robert J. Mrazek (Democratic) 57.2%; ▌Robert Previdi (Republican) 40.6%; ▌Robert J. Considine (Right to Life) 1.6%; ▌Anthony Signorelli (Liberal) 0.5%
New York 4	Norman F. Lent	Republican	1970	Incumbent re-elected.	▌ ✓ Norman F. Lent (Republican) 70.1%; ▌Francis T. Goban (Democratic) 27.6%; ▌Margaret T. McGeary (Right to Life) 2.3%
New York 5	Ray McGrath	Republican	1980	Incumbent re-elected.	▌ ✓ Ray McGrath (Republican) 65.1%; ▌William G. Kelly (Democratic) 33.2%; ▌James A. Matier (Right to Life) 1.7%
New York 6	Floyd Flake	Democratic	1986	Incumbent re-elected.	▌ ✓ Floyd Flake (Democratic) 85.9%; ▌Robert L. Brandofino (Conservative) 14.1%
New York 7	Gary Ackerman	Democratic	1983	Incumbent re-elected.	▌ ✓ Gary Ackerman (Democratic); Uncontested
New York 8	James H. Scheuer	Democratic	1964; 1972 (lost); 1974	Incumbent re-elected.	▌ ✓ James H. Scheuer (Democratic); Uncontested
New York 9	Thomas Manton	Democratic	1984	Incumbent re-elected.	▌ ✓ Thomas Manton (Democratic); Uncontested
New York 10	Chuck Schumer	Democratic	1980	Incumbent re-elected.	▌ ✓ Chuck Schumer (Democratic) 78.4%; ▌George S. Popielarski (Republican) 17.8%; ▌Alice Gaffney (Conservative) 3.8%
New York 11	Edolphus Towns	Democratic	1982	Incumbent re-elected.	▌ ✓ Edolphus Towns (Democratic) 88.7%; ▌Riaz B. Hussain (Republican) 8.9%; ▌Alfred Hamel (Conservative) 1.5%; ▌Lorraine Stevens (New Alliance) 0.9%
New York 12	Major Owens	Democratic	1982	Incumbent re-elected.	▌ ✓ Major Owens (Democratic) 93.0%; ▌Owen Augustin (Republican) 7.0%
New York 13	Stephen Solarz	Democratic	1974	Incumbent re-elected.	▌ ✓ Stephen Solarz (Democratic) 74.7%; ▌Anthony M. Curci (Republican) 25.3%
New York 14	Guy Molinari	Republican	1980	Incumbent re-elected.	▌ ✓ Guy Molinari (Republican) 63.3%; ▌Jerome X. O'Donovan (Democratic) 36.7%
New York 15	Bill Green	Republican	1978	Incumbent re-elected.	▌ ✓ Bill Green (Republican) 61.3%; ▌Peter G. Doukas (Democratic) 36.7%; ▌John B. Levitt (Liberal) 2.0%
New York 16	Charles Rangel	Democratic	1970	Incumbent re-elected.	▌ ✓ Charles Rangel (Democratic) 97.1%; ▌Michael Liccione (Conservative) 1.6%; ▌Barbara R. Taylor (New Alliance) 1.3%
New York 17	Ted Weiss	Democratic	1976	Incumbent re-elected.	▌ ✓ Ted Weiss (Democratic) 84.4%; ▌Myrna C. Albert (Republican) 15.6%
New York 18	Robert García	Democratic	1978	Incumbent re-elected.	▌ ✓ Robert García (Democratic) 91.1%; ▌Fred Brown (Republican) 7.0%; ▌Rafael Méndez (New Alliance) 1.1%; ▌Daniel Verhoff (Conservative) 0.9%
New York 19	Mario Biaggi	Democratic	1968	Incumbent resigned August 5, 1988, but remained on the ballot. Democratic hold.	▌ ✓ Eliot Engel (Democratic) 56.0%; ▌Mario Biaggi (Republican) 27.2%; ▌Martin J. O'Grady (Right to Life) 8.2%; ▌Robert Blumetti (Conservative) 8.1%; ▌Michael Zagarell (Independent) 0.5%
New York 20	Joe DioGuardi	Republican	1984	Incumbent lost re-election. Democratic gain.	▌ ✓ Nita Lowey (Democratic) 50.3%; ▌Joe DioGuardi (Republican) 47.5%; ▌Florence T. O'Grady (Right to Life) 1.4%; ▌Henry M. Levine (Liberal) 0.8%
New York 21	Hamilton Fish IV	Republican	1968	Incumbent re-elected.	▌ ✓ Hamilton Fish IV (Republican) 74.6%; ▌Lawrence W. Grunberger (Democratic) 23.5%; ▌Richard S. Curtin II (Right to Life) 1.9%
New York 22	Benjamin Gilman	Republican	1972	Incumbent re-elected.	▌ ✓ Benjamin Gilman (Republican) 70.8%; ▌Eleanor F. Burlingham (Democratic) 26.7%; ▌Barbara E. Braun (Right to Life) 2.5%
New York 23	Samuel S. Stratton	Democratic	1958	Incumbent retired. Democratic hold.	▌ ✓ Michael McNulty (Democratic) 61.7%; ▌Peter M. Bakal (Republican) 38.3%
New York 24	Gerald Solomon	Republican	1978	Incumbent re-elected.	▌ ✓ Gerald Solomon (Republican) 72.4%; ▌Fred Baye (Democratic) 27.6%
New York 25	Sherwood Boehlert	Republican	1982	Incumbent re-elected.	▌ ✓ Sherwood Boehlert (Republican); Uncontested
New York 26	David O'Brien Martin	Republican	1980	Incumbent re-elected.	▌ ✓ David O'Brien Martin (Republican) 75.0%; ▌Donald R. Ravenscroft (Democratic) 25.0%
New York 27	George C. Wortley	Republican	1980	Incumbent retired. Republican hold.	▌ ✓ James T. Walsh (Republican) 57.5%; ▌Rosemary S. Pooler (Democratic) 41.8%; ▌Stephen K. Hoff (Right to Life) 0.8%
New York 28	Matthew F. McHugh	Democratic	1974	Incumbent re-elected.	▌ ✓ Matthew F. McHugh (Democratic) 93.2%; ▌Mary C. Dixon (Right to Life) 6.8%
New York 29	Frank Horton	Republican	1962	Incumbent re-elected.	▌ ✓ Frank Horton (Republican) 68.8%; ▌James R. Vogel (Democratic) 26.6%; ▌Richard G. Baxter (Conservative) 3.0%; ▌Donald M. Peters (Right to Life) 1.6%
New York 30	Louise Slaughter	Democratic	1986	Incumbent re-elected.	▌ ✓ Louise Slaughter (Democratic) 56.9%; ▌John D. Bouchard (Republican) 39.5%; ▌Thomas D. Cook (Conservative) 2.8%; ▌Michael P. Flanagan (Right to Life) 0.9%
New York 31	Jack Kemp	Republican	1970	Incumbent retired to run for U.S. President. Republican hold.	▌ ✓ Bill Paxon (Republican) 53.4%; ▌David J. Swarts (Democratic) 46.6%
New York 32	John LaFalce	Democratic	1974	Incumbent re-elected.	▌ ✓ John LaFalce (Democratic) 72.7%; ▌Emil K. Everett (Republican) 27.3%
New York 33	Henry J. Nowak	Democratic	1974	Incumbent re-elected.	▌ ✓ Henry J. Nowak (Democratic); Uncontested
New York 34	Amo Houghton	Republican	1986	Incumbent re-elected.	▌ ✓ Amo Houghton (Republican) 96.5%; ▌Ian Kelly Woodward (Liberal) 3.5%

== North Carolina ==
District	Incumbent	Party	First elected	Result	Candidates
North Carolina 1	Walter B. Jones Sr.	Democratic	1966	Incumbent re-elected.	▌ ✓ Walter B. Jones Sr. (Democratic) 65.2%; ▌Howard Moye (Republican) 34.8%
North Carolina 2	Tim Valentine	Democratic	1982	Incumbent re-elected.	▌ ✓ Tim Valentine (Democratic); Uncontested
North Carolina 3	Martin Lancaster	Democratic	1986	Incumbent re-elected.	▌ ✓ Martin Lancaster (Democratic); Uncontested
North Carolina 4	David Price	Democratic	1986	Incumbent re-elected.	▌ ✓ David Price (Democratic) 58.0%; ▌Tom Fetzer (Republican) 42.0%
North Carolina 5	Stephen L. Neal	Democratic	1974	Incumbent re-elected.	▌ ✓ Stephen L. Neal (Democratic) 52.6%; ▌Lyons Gray (Republican) 47.4%
North Carolina 6	Howard Coble	Republican	1984	Incumbent re-elected.	▌ ✓ Howard Coble (Republican) 62.5%; ▌Tom Gilmore (Democratic) 37.5%
North Carolina 7	Charlie Rose	Democratic	1972	Incumbent re-elected.	▌ ✓ Charlie Rose (Democratic) 67.3%; ▌George G. Thompson (Republican) 32.7%
North Carolina 8	Bill Hefner	Democratic	1974	Incumbent re-elected.	▌ ✓ Bill Hefner (Democratic) 51.5%; ▌Ted Blanton (Republican) 48.5%
North Carolina 9	Alex McMillan	Republican	1984	Incumbent re-elected.	▌ ✓ Alex McMillan (Republican) 65.9%; ▌Mark Sholander (Democratic) 34.1%
North Carolina 10	Cass Ballenger	Republican	1986	Incumbent re-elected.	▌ ✓ Cass Ballenger (Republican) 61.0%; ▌Jack L. Rhyne (Democratic) 39.0%
North Carolina 11	James M. Clarke	Democratic	1982; 1984 (lost); 1986	Incumbent re-elected.	▌ ✓ James M. Clarke (Democratic) 50.4%; ▌Charles Taylor (Republican) 49.6%

== North Dakota ==
District	Incumbent	Party	First elected	Result	Candidates
North Dakota at-large	Byron Dorgan	Democratic-NPL	1980	Incumbent re-elected.	▌ ✓ Byron Dorgan (Democratic-NPL) 70.9%; ▌Steve Sydness (Republican) 28.2%; ▌Kris Brekke (Independent) 1.0%

== Ohio ==
District	Incumbent	Party	First elected	Result	Candidates
Ohio 1	Tom Luken	Democratic	1974 (special); 1974 (lost); 1976	Incumbent re-elected.	▌ ✓ Tom Luken (Democratic) 56.5%; ▌Steve Chabot (Republican) 43.5%
Ohio 2	Bill Gradison	Republican	1974	Incumbent re-elected.	▌ ✓ Bill Gradison (Republican) 72.3%; ▌Chuck R. Stidham (Democratic) 27.7%
Ohio 3	Tony P. Hall	Democratic	1978	Incumbent re-elected.	▌ ✓ Tony P. Hall (Democratic) 76.9%; ▌Ron Crutcher (Republican) 23.1%
Ohio 4	Mike Oxley	Republican	1972	Incumbent re-elected.	▌ ✓ Mike Oxley (Republican); Uncontested
Ohio 5	Del Latta	Republican	1958	Incumbent retired. Republican hold.	▌ ✓ Paul Gillmor (Republican) 60.6%; ▌Tom Murray (Democratic) 39.4%
Ohio 6	Bob McEwen	Republican	1980	Incumbent re-elected.	▌ ✓ Bob McEwen (Republican) 74.3%; ▌Gordon R. Roberts (Democratic) 25.7%
Ohio 7	Mike DeWine	Republican	1982	Incumbent re-elected.	▌ ✓ Mike DeWine (Republican) 73.9%; ▌Jack Schira (Democratic) 26.1%
Ohio 8	Buz Lukens	Republican	1966; 1970 (retired); 1986	Incumbent re-elected.	▌ ✓ Buz Lukens (Republican) 75.9%; ▌John W. Griffin (Democratic) 24.1%
Ohio 9	Marcy Kaptur	Democratic	1982	Incumbent re-elected.	▌ ✓ Marcy Kaptur (Democratic) 81.3%; ▌Al Hawkins (Republican) 18.7%
Ohio 10	Clarence E. Miller	Republican	1966	Incumbent re-elected.	▌ ✓ Clarence E. Miller (Republican) 71.6%; ▌John M. Buchanan (Democratic) 28.4%
Ohio 11	Dennis E. Eckart	Democratic	1980	Incumbent re-elected.	▌ ✓ Dennis E. Eckart (Democratic) 61.5%; ▌Margaret R. Mueller (Republican) 38.5%
Ohio 12	John Kasich	Republican	1982	Incumbent re-elected.	▌ ✓ John Kasich (Republican) 80.1%; ▌Mark P. Brown (Democratic) 19.9%
Ohio 13	Donald J. Pease	Democratic	1976	Incumbent re-elected.	▌ ✓ Donald J. Pease (Democratic) 69.8%; ▌Dwight Brown (Republican) 30.2%
Ohio 14	Tom Sawyer	Democratic	1986	Incumbent re-elected.	▌ ✓ Tom Sawyer (Democratic) 74.7%; ▌Loretta Lang (Republican) 25.3%
Ohio 15	Chalmers Wylie	Republican	1966	Incumbent re-elected.	▌ ✓ Chalmers Wylie (Republican) 75.1%; ▌Mark S. Froehlich (Democratic) 24.9%
Ohio 16	Ralph Regula	Republican	1972	Incumbent re-elected.	▌ ✓ Ralph Regula (Republican) 78.6%; ▌Melvin J. Gravely (Democratic) 21.4%
Ohio 17	James Traficant	Democratic	1984	Incumbent re-elected.	▌ ✓ James Traficant (Democratic) 77.2%; ▌Frederick W. Lenz (Republican) 22.8%
Ohio 18	Douglas Applegate	Democratic	1976	Incumbent re-elected.	▌ ✓ Douglas Applegate (Democratic) 77.6%; ▌William C. Abraham (Republican) 22.4%
Ohio 19	Ed Feighan	Democratic	1982	Incumbent re-elected.	▌ ✓ Ed Feighan (Democratic) 70.5%; ▌Noel F. Roberts (Republican) 29.5%
Ohio 20	Mary Rose Oakar	Democratic	1976	Incumbent re-elected.	▌ ✓ Mary Rose Oakar (Democratic) 82.6%; ▌Michael Sajna (Republican) 17.4%
Ohio 21	Louis Stokes	Democratic	1968	Incumbent re-elected.	▌ ✓ Louis Stokes (Democratic) 85.7%; ▌Franklin H. Roski (Republican) 14.3%

== Oklahoma ==
District	Incumbent	Party	First elected	Result	Candidates
Oklahoma 1	Jim Inhofe	Republican	1986	Incumbent re-elected.	▌ ✓ Jim Inhofe (Republican) 52.6%; ▌Kurt Glassco (Democratic) 47.4%
Oklahoma 2	Mike Synar	Democratic	1978	Incumbent re-elected.	▌ ✓ Mike Synar (Democratic) 64.9%; ▌Ira Phillips (Republican) 35.1%
Oklahoma 3	Wes Watkins	Democratic	1976	Incumbent re-elected.	▌ ✓ Wes Watkins (Democratic); Uncontested
Oklahoma 4	Dave McCurdy	Democratic	1980	Incumbent re-elected.	▌ ✓ Dave McCurdy (Democratic); Uncontested
Oklahoma 5	Mickey Edwards	Republican	1976	Incumbent re-elected.	▌ ✓ Mickey Edwards (Republican) 72.2%; ▌Terry J. Montgomery (Democratic) 27.8%
Oklahoma 6	Glenn English	Democratic	1974	Incumbent re-elected.	▌ ✓ Glenn English (Democratic) 73.1%; ▌Mike Brown (Republican) 26.9%

== Oregon ==
District	Incumbent	Party	First elected	Result	Candidates
Oregon 1	Les AuCoin	Democratic	1974	Incumbent re-elected.	▌ ✓ Les AuCoin (Democratic) 69.6%; ▌Earl Molander (Republican) 30.4%
Oregon 2	Bob Smith	Republican	1982	Incumbent re-elected.	▌ ✓ Bob Smith (Republican) 62.7%; ▌Larry Tuttle (Democratic) 37.3%
Oregon 3	Ron Wyden	Democratic	1980	Incumbent re-elected.	▌ ✓ Ron Wyden (Democratic); Uncontested
Oregon 4	Peter DeFazio	Democratic	1986	Incumbent re-elected.	▌ ✓ Peter DeFazio (Democratic) 72.0%; ▌Jim Howard (Republican) 28.0%
Oregon 5	Denny Smith	Republican	1980	Incumbent re-elected.	▌ ✓ Denny Smith (Republican) 50.2%; ▌Mike Kopetski (Democratic) 49.8%

== Pennsylvania ==
District	Incumbent	Party	First elected	Result	Candidates
Pennsylvania 1	Thomas M. Foglietta	Democratic	1980	Incumbent re-elected.	▌ ✓ Thomas M. Foglietta (Democratic) 76.3%; ▌William J. O'Brien (Republican) 23.7%
Pennsylvania 2	William H. Gray III	Democratic	1978	Incumbent re-elected.	▌ ✓ William H. Gray III (Democratic) 93.7%; ▌Richard L. Harsch (Republican) 6.3%
Pennsylvania 3	Robert Borski	Democratic	1982	Incumbent re-elected.	▌ ✓ Robert Borski (Democratic) 63.2%; ▌Mark Matthews (Republican) 36.8%
Pennsylvania 4	Joe Kolter	Democratic	1982	Incumbent re-elected.	▌ ✓ Joe Kolter (Democratic) 69.8%; ▌Gordon R. Johnston (Republican) 29.5%; ▌Erich L. Kaltenhauser (Populist) 0.7%
Pennsylvania 5	Dick Schulze	Republican	1974	Incumbent re-elected.	▌ ✓ Dick Schulze (Republican) 78.2%; ▌Donald A. Hadley (Democratic) 21.8%
Pennsylvania 6	Gus Yatron	Democratic	1968	Incumbent re-elected.	▌ ✓ Gus Yatron (Democratic) 63.1%; ▌James R. Erwin (Republican) 36.1%; ▌Louis Perugini Jr. (Independent) 0.7%
Pennsylvania 7	Curt Weldon	Republican	1986	Incumbent re-elected.	▌ ✓ Curt Weldon (Republican) 67.8%; ▌David Landau (Democratic) 32.2%
Pennsylvania 8	Peter H. Kostmayer	Democratic	1976; 1980 (lost); 1982	Incumbent re-elected.	▌ ✓ Peter H. Kostmayer (Democratic) 56.8%; ▌Ed Howard (Republican) 41.5%; ▌Donald C. Ernsberger (Libertarian) 1.7%
Pennsylvania 9	Bud Shuster	Republican	1972	Incumbent re-elected.	▌ ✓ Bud Shuster (Republican); Uncontested
Pennsylvania 10	Joseph M. McDade	Republican	1962	Incumbent re-elected.	▌ ✓ Joseph M. McDade (Republican) 73.2%; ▌Robert C. Cordaro (Democratic) 26.8%
Pennsylvania 11	Paul Kanjorski	Democratic	1984	Incumbent re-elected.	▌ ✓ Paul Kanjorski (Democratic); Uncontested
Pennsylvania 12	John Murtha	Democratic	1974	Incumbent re-elected.	▌ ✓ John Murtha (Democratic); Uncontested
Pennsylvania 13	Lawrence Coughlin	Republican	1968	Incumbent re-elected.	▌ ✓ Lawrence Coughlin (Republican) 66.6%; ▌Bernard Tomkin (Democratic) 33.4%
Pennsylvania 14	William J. Coyne	Democratic	1980	Incumbent re-elected.	▌ ✓ William J. Coyne (Democratic) 78.6%; ▌Richard E. Caligiuri (Libertarian) 21.4%
Pennsylvania 15	Donald L. Ritter	Republican	1978	Incumbent re-elected.	▌ ✓ Donald L. Ritter (Republican) 57.5%; ▌Ed Reibman (Democratic) 42.5%
Pennsylvania 16	Bob Walker	Republican	1976	Incumbent re-elected.	▌ ✓ Bob Walker (Republican) 74.0%; ▌Ernest Eric Guyll (Democratic) 26.0%
Pennsylvania 17	George Gekas	Republican	1982	Incumbent re-elected.	▌ ✓ George Gekas (Republican); Uncontested
Pennsylvania 18	Doug Walgren	Democratic	1976	Incumbent re-elected.	▌ ✓ Doug Walgren (Democratic) 62.7%; ▌John A. Newman (Republican) 37.1%; ▌James J. Bailey (Populist) 0.3%
Pennsylvania 19	Bill Goodling	Republican	1974	Incumbent re-elected.	▌ ✓ Bill Goodling (Republican) 77.2%; ▌Paul E. Ritchey (Democratic) 22.8%
Pennsylvania 20	Joseph M. Gaydos	Democratic	1968	Incumbent re-elected.	▌ ✓ Joseph M. Gaydos (Democratic) 98.5%; ▌Richard W. Wilson (Populist) 1.5%
Pennsylvania 21	Tom Ridge	Republican	1982	Incumbent re-elected.	▌ ✓ Tom Ridge (Republican) 78.7%; ▌George R. H. Elder (Democratic) 21.3%
Pennsylvania 22	Austin Murphy	Democratic	1976	Incumbent re-elected.	▌ ✓ Austin Murphy (Democratic) 72.4%; ▌William Hodgkiss (Republican) 27.6%
Pennsylvania 23	William Clinger	Republican	1978	Incumbent re-elected.	▌ ✓ William Clinger (Republican) 62.0%; ▌Howard Shakespeare (Democratic) 37.3%; ▌William Smolik (Populist) 0.7%

== Rhode Island ==
District	Incumbent	Party	First elected	Result	Candidates
Rhode Island 1	Fernand St Germain	Democratic	1960	Incumbent lost re-election. Republican gain.	▌ ✓ Ronald Machtley (Republican) 55.6%; ▌Fernand St Germain (Democratic) 44.4%
Rhode Island 2	Claudine Schneider	Republican	1980	Incumbent re-elected.	▌ ✓ Claudine Schneider (Republican) 72.1%; ▌Ruth S. Morgenthau (Democratic) 27.9%

== South Carolina ==
District	Incumbent	Party	First elected	Result	Candidates
South Carolina 1	Arthur Ravenel Jr.	Republican	1986	Incumbent re-elected.	▌ ✓ Arthur Ravenel Jr. (Republican) 63.8%; ▌Wheeler Tillman (Democratic) 36.2%
South Carolina 2	Floyd Spence	Republican	1970	Incumbent re-elected.	▌ ✓ Floyd Spence (Republican) 52.8%; ▌Jim Leventis (Democratic) 46.7%; ▌Geb Sommer (Libertarian) 0.6%
South Carolina 3	Butler Derrick	Democratic	1974	Incumbent re-elected.	▌ ✓ Butler Derrick (Democratic) 53.7%; ▌Henry Jordan (Republican) 45.6%; ▌John B. Heaton (Libertarian) 0.7%
South Carolina 4	Liz J. Patterson	Democratic	1986	Incumbent re-elected.	▌ ✓ Liz J. Patterson (Democratic) 52.2%; ▌Knox White (Republican) 47.8%
South Carolina 5	John Spratt	Democratic	1982	Incumbent re-elected.	▌ ✓ John Spratt (Democratic) 69.8%; ▌Robert K. Carley (Republican) 30.2%
South Carolina 6	Robin Tallon	Democratic	1982	Incumbent re-elected.	▌ ✓ Robin Tallon (Democratic) 76.1%; ▌Bob Cunningham (Republican) 23.9%

== South Dakota ==
District	Incumbent	Party	First elected	Result	Candidates
South Dakota at-large	Tim Johnson	Democratic	1986	Incumbent re-elected.	▌ ✓ Tim Johnson (Democratic) 71.7%; ▌David Volk (Republican) 28.3%

== Tennessee ==
District	Incumbent	Party	First elected	Result	Candidates
Tennessee 1	Jimmy Quillen	Republican	1962	Incumbent re-elected.	▌ ✓ Jimmy Quillen (Republican) 80.2%; ▌Sidney S. Smith (Democratic) 19.8%
Tennessee 2	John Duncan Sr.	Republican	1964	Incumbent died June 21, 1988. Republican hold. Winner was also elected to finish the current term; see above.	▌ ✓ Jimmy Duncan (Republican) 56.2%; ▌Dudley W. Taylor (Democratic) 43.8%
Tennessee 3	Marilyn Lloyd	Democratic	1974	Incumbent re-elected.	▌ ✓ Marilyn Lloyd (Democratic) 57.4%; ▌Harold L. Coker (Republican) 42.6%
Tennessee 4	Jim Cooper	Democratic	1982	Incumbent re-elected.	▌ ✓ Jim Cooper (Democratic); Uncontested
Tennessee 5	Bob Clement	Democratic	1988	Incumbent re-elected.	▌ ✓ Bob Clement (Democratic); Uncontested
Tennessee 6	Bart Gordon	Democratic	1984	Incumbent re-elected.	▌ ✓ Bart Gordon (Democratic) 76.5%; ▌Wallace Embry (Republican) 23.5%
Tennessee 7	Don Sundquist	Republican	1982	Incumbent re-elected.	▌ ✓ Don Sundquist (Republican) 80.1%; ▌Ken Bloodworth (Democratic) 19.9%
Tennessee 8	Ed Jones	Democratic	1969	Incumbent retired. Democratic hold.	▌ ✓ John S. Tanner (Democratic) 62.4%; ▌Ed Bryant (Republican) 37.6%
Tennessee 9	Harold Ford Sr.	Democratic	1974	Incumbent re-elected.	▌ ✓ Harold Ford Sr. (Democratic) 81.6%; ▌Isaac Richmond (Independent) 18.4%

== Texas ==
District	Incumbent	Party	First elected	Result	Candidates
Texas 1	Jim Chapman	Democratic	1985	Incumbent re-elected.	▌ ✓ Jim Chapman (Democratic) 62.2%; ▌Horace McQueen (Republican) 37.8%
Texas 2	Charles Wilson	Democratic	1972	Incumbent re-elected.	▌ ✓ Charles Wilson (Democratic) 87.7%; ▌Gary W. Nelson (Libertarian) 12.3%
Texas 3	Steve Bartlett	Republican	1982	Incumbent re-elected.	▌ ✓ Steve Bartlett (Republican) 81.8%; ▌Blake Cowden (Democratic) 18.2%
Texas 4	Ralph Hall	Democratic	1980	Incumbent re-elected.	▌ ✓ Ralph Hall (Democratic) 66.4%; ▌Randy Sutton (Republican) 32.1%; ▌Melanie A. Dunn (Libertarian) 1.5%
Texas 5	John Bryant	Democratic	1982	Incumbent re-elected.	▌ ✓ John Bryant (Democratic) 60.7%; ▌Lon Williams (Republican) 38.1%; ▌Ken Ashby (Libertarian) 1.1%
Texas 6	Joe Barton	Republican	1984	Incumbent re-elected.	▌ ✓ Joe Barton (Republican) 67.6%; ▌Pat Kendrick (Democratic) 32.4%
Texas 7	Bill Archer	Republican	1970	Incumbent re-elected.	▌ ✓ Bill Archer (Republican) 79.1%; ▌Dianne Richards (Democratic) 20.9%
Texas 8	Jack Fields	Republican	1980	Incumbent re-elected.	▌ ✓ Jack Fields (Republican); Uncontested
Texas 9	Jack Brooks	Democratic	1952	Incumbent re-elected.	▌ ✓ Jack Brooks (Democratic); Uncontested
Texas 10	J. J. Pickle	Democratic	1963	Incumbent re-elected.	▌ ✓ J. J. Pickle (Democratic) 93.4%; ▌Vincent J. May (Libertarian) 6.6%
Texas 11	Marvin Leath	Democratic	1978	Incumbent re-elected.	▌ ✓ Marvin Leath (Democratic) 95.4%; ▌Frederick M. King (Libertarian) 4.6%
Texas 12	Jim Wright	Democratic	1954	Incumbent re-elected.	▌ ✓ Jim Wright (Democratic); Uncontested
Texas 13	Beau Boulter	Republican	1984	Incumbent retired to run for U.S. Senator. Democratic gain.	▌ ✓ Bill Sarpalius (Democratic) 52.5%; ▌Larry S. Milner (Republican) 47.5%
Texas 14	Mac Sweeney	Republican	1984	Incumbent lost re-election. Democratic gain.	▌ ✓ Greg Laughlin (Democratic) 53.2%; ▌Mac Sweeney (Republican) 45.9%; ▌Don Kelley (Libertarian) 0.9%
Texas 15	Kika de la Garza	Democratic	1964	Incumbent re-elected.	▌ ✓ Kika de la Garza (Democratic) 93.9%; ▌Gloria Joyce Hendrix (Libertarian) 6.1%
Texas 16	Ron Coleman	Democratic	1982	Incumbent re-elected.	▌ ✓ Ron Coleman (Democratic); Uncontested
Texas 17	Charles Stenholm	Democratic	1978	Incumbent re-elected.	▌ ✓ Charles Stenholm (Democratic); Uncontested
Texas 18	Mickey Leland	Democratic	1978	Incumbent re-elected.	▌ ✓ Mickey Leland (Democratic) 92.9%; ▌J. Alejandro Snead (Libertarian) 7.1%
Texas 19	Larry Combest	Republican	1984	Incumbent re-elected.	▌ ✓ Larry Combest (Republican) 67.7%; ▌Gerald McCathern (Democratic) 32.3%
Texas 20	Henry B. González	Democratic	1961	Incumbent re-elected.	▌ ✓ Henry B. González (Democratic) 70.7%; ▌Lee Travino (Republican) 27.5%; ▌Theresa S. Doyle (Libertarian) 1.8%
Texas 21	Lamar Smith	Republican	1986	Incumbent re-elected.	▌ ✓ Lamar Smith (Republican) 93.2%; ▌Jim Robinson (Libertarian) 6.8%
Texas 22	Tom DeLay	Republican	1984	Incumbent re-elected.	▌ ✓ Tom DeLay (Republican) 67.4%; ▌Wayne Walker (Democratic) 31.4%; ▌George Harper (Libertarian) 1.2%
Texas 23	Albert Bustamante	Democratic	1984	Incumbent re-elected.	▌ ✓ Albert Bustamante (Democratic) 64.5%; ▌Jerry Gonzales (Republican) 33.6%; ▌Tony R. Garza (Libertarian) 1.9%
Texas 24	Martin Frost	Democratic	1978	Incumbent re-elected.	▌ ✓ Martin Frost (Democratic) 92.6%; ▌Leo Sadovy (Republican) 7.4%
Texas 25	Michael A. Andrews	Democratic	1982	Incumbent re-elected.	▌ ✓ Michael A. Andrews (Democratic) 71.4%; ▌George Loeffler (Republican) 27.7%; ▌Kevin Southwick (Libertarian) 0.9%
Texas 26	Dick Armey	Republican	1984	Incumbent re-elected.	▌ ✓ Dick Armey (Republican) 69.3%; ▌Jo Ann Reyes (Democratic) 30.7%
Texas 27	Solomon Ortiz	Democratic	1982	Incumbent re-elected.	▌ ✓ Solomon Ortiz (Democratic); Uncontested

== Utah ==
District	Incumbent	Party	First elected	Result	Candidates
Utah 1	Jim Hansen	Republican	1980	Incumbent re-elected.	▌ ✓ Jim Hansen (Republican) 59.8%; ▌K. Gunn McKay (Democratic) 40.2%
Utah 2	Wayne Owens	Democratic	1972; 1974 (retired); 1986	Incumbent re-elected.	▌ ✓ Wayne Owens (Democratic) 57.4%; ▌Richard Snelgrove (Republican) 41.1%; ▌Michael Lee (Libertarian) 1.5%
Utah 3	Howard C. Nielson	Republican	1982	Incumbent re-elected.	▌ ✓ Howard C. Nielson (Republican) 66.8%; ▌Robert W. Stringham (Democratic) 30.9%; ▌E. Dean Christensen (American) 1.7%; ▌Judy Stranahan (Socialist Workers) 0.6%

== Vermont ==
District	Incumbent	Party	First elected	Result	Candidates
Vermont at-large	Jim Jeffords	Republican	1974	Incumbent retired to run for U.S. Senator. Republican hold.	▌ ✓ Peter Plympton Smith (Republican) 41.2%; ▌Bernie Sanders (Independent) 37.5%; ▌Paul N. Poirier (Democratic) 18.9%; ▌Jim Hedbor (Libertarian) 1.3%; ▌Peter Diamondstone (Liberty Union) 0.6%; ▌Morris Earle (Independent) 0.4%

== Virginia ==
District	Incumbent	Party	First elected	Result	Candidates
Virginia 1	Herb Bateman	Republican	1982	Incumbent re-elected.	▌ ✓ Herb Bateman (Republican) 73.3%; ▌James S. Ellenson (Democratic) 26.7%
Virginia 2	Owen B. Pickett	Democratic	1986	Incumbent re-elected.	▌ ✓ Owen B. Pickett (Democratic) 60.5%; ▌Jerry R. Curry (Republican) 35.5%; ▌Stephen P. Shao (Independent) 2.4%; ▌Robert A. Smith (Independent) 1.5%
Virginia 3	Thomas J. Bliley Jr.	Republican	1980	Incumbent re-elected.	▌ ✓ Thomas J. Bliley Jr. (Republican); Uncontested
Virginia 4	Norman Sisisky	Democratic	1982	Incumbent re-elected.	▌ ✓ Norman Sisisky (Democratic); Uncontested
Virginia 5	Lewis F. Payne Jr.	Democratic	1988	Incumbent re-elected.	▌ ✓ Lewis F. Payne Jr. (Democratic) 54.2%; ▌Charles R. Hawkins (Republican) 43.7%; ▌Frank Cole (Independent) 2.1%
Virginia 6	Jim Olin	Democratic	1982	Incumbent re-elected.	▌ ✓ Jim Olin (Democratic) 63.9%; ▌Charles E. Judd (Republican) 36.1%
Virginia 7	D. French Slaughter Jr.	Republican	1984	Incumbent re-elected.	▌ ✓ D. French Slaughter Jr. (Republican); Uncontested
Virginia 8	Stanford Parris	Republican	1972; 1974 (lost); 1980	Incumbent re-elected.	▌ ✓ Stanford Parris (Republican) 62.3%; ▌David G. Brickley (Democratic) 37.7%
Virginia 9	Rick Boucher	Democratic	1982	Incumbent re-elected.	▌ ✓ Rick Boucher (Democratic) 63.4%; ▌John C. Brown (Republican) 36.6%
Virginia 10	Frank Wolf	Republican	1980	Incumbent re-elected.	▌ ✓ Frank Wolf (Republican) 68.1%; ▌Robert L. Weinberg (Democratic) 31.9%

== Washington ==
District	Incumbent	Party	First elected	Result	Candidates
Washington 1	John Miller	Republican	1984	Incumbent re-elected.	▌ ✓ John Miller (Republican) 55.4%; ▌Reese M. Lindquist (Democratic) 44.6%
Washington 2	Al Swift	Democratic	1978	Incumbent re-elected.	▌ ✓ Al Swift (Democratic); Uncontested
Washington 3	Don Bonker	Democratic	1974	Incumbent retired to run for U.S. Senator. Democratic hold.	▌ ✓ Jolene Unsoeld (Democratic) 50.1%; ▌Bill Wight (Republican) 49.9%
Washington 4	Sid Morrison	Republican	1980	Incumbent re-elected.	▌ ✓ Sid Morrison (Republican) 74.5%; ▌J. Richard Golob (Democratic) 25.5%
Washington 5	Tom Foley	Democratic	1964	Incumbent re-elected.	▌ ✓ Tom Foley (Democratic) 76.4%; ▌Marlyn A. Derby (Republican) 23.6%
Washington 6	Norm Dicks	Democratic	1976	Incumbent re-elected.	▌ ✓ Norm Dicks (Democratic) 67.6%; ▌Kevin P. Cook (Republican) 32.4%
Washington 7	Mike Lowry	Democratic	1978	Incumbent retired to run for U.S. Senator. Democratic hold.	▌ ✓ Jim McDermott (Democratic) 76.3%; ▌Robert Edwards (Republican) 23.7%
Washington 8	Rod Chandler	Republican	1982	Incumbent re-elected.	▌ ✓ Rod Chandler (Republican) 70.9%; ▌Jim Kean (Democratic) 29.1%

== West Virginia ==
District	Incumbent	Party	First elected	Result	Candidates
West Virginia 1	Alan Mollohan	Democratic	1982	Incumbent re-elected.	▌ ✓ Alan Mollohan (Democratic) 74.5%; ▌Howard Tuck (Republican) 25.5%
West Virginia 2	Harley O. Staggers Jr.	Democratic	1982	Incumbent re-elected.	▌ ✓ Harley O. Staggers Jr. (Democratic); Uncontested
West Virginia 3	Bob Wise	Democratic	1982	Incumbent re-elected.	▌ ✓ Bob Wise (Democratic) 74.3%; ▌Paul W. Hart (Republican) 25.7%
West Virginia 4	Nick Rahall	Democratic	1976	Incumbent re-elected.	▌ ✓ Nick Rahall (Democratic) 61.3%; ▌Marianne R. Brewster (Republican) 38.7%

== Wisconsin ==
District	Incumbent	Party	First elected	Result	Candidates
Wisconsin 1	Les Aspin	Democratic	1970	Incumbent re-elected.	▌ ✓ Les Aspin (Democratic) 76.2%; ▌Bernard J. Weaver (Republican) 23.8%
Wisconsin 2	Robert Kastenmeier	Democratic	1958	Incumbent re-elected.	▌ ✓ Robert Kastenmeier (Democratic) 58.5%; ▌Ann J. Haney (Republican) 41.5%
Wisconsin 3	Steve Gunderson	Republican	1980	Incumbent re-elected.	▌ ✓ Steve Gunderson (Republican) 68.4%; ▌Karl Krueger (Democratic) 31.6%
Wisconsin 4	Jerry Kleczka	Democratic	1984	Incumbent re-elected.	▌ ✓ Jerry Kleczka (Democratic); Uncontested
Wisconsin 5	Jim Moody	Democratic	1982	Incumbent re-elected.	▌ ✓ Jim Moody (Democratic) 64.2%; ▌Helen I. Barnhill (Republican) 35.8%
Wisconsin 6	Tom Petri	Republican	1979 (special)	Incumbent re-elected.	▌ ✓ Tom Petri (Republican) 74.2%; ▌Joseph Garrett (Democratic) 25.8%
Wisconsin 7	Dave Obey	Democratic	1969 (special)	Incumbent re-elected.	▌ ✓ Dave Obey (Democratic) 61.8%; ▌Kevin J. Hermening (Republican) 37.4%; ▌John T. A. Duelge (Independent) 0.8%
Wisconsin 8	Toby Roth	Republican	1978	Incumbent re-elected.	▌ ✓ Toby Roth (Republican) 69.7%; ▌Robert A. Baron (Democratic) 30.3%
Wisconsin 9	Jim Sensenbrenner	Republican	1978	Incumbent re-elected.	▌ ✓ Jim Sensenbrenner (Republican) 74.9%; ▌Thomas J. Hickey (Democratic) 25.1%

== Wyoming ==
District	Incumbent	Party	First elected	Result	Candidates
Wyoming at-large	Dick Cheney	Republican	1978	Incumbent re-elected.	▌ ✓ Dick Cheney (Republican) 66.6%; ▌Bryan Sharratt (Democratic) 31.8%; ▌Craig Alan McCune (Libertarian) 1.1%; ▌Al Hamburg (New Alliance) 0.5%

== Non-voting delegates ==
District	Incumbent			This race	
District	Delegate	Party	First elected	Results	Candidates
American Samoa at-large	Fofō Iosefa Fiti Sunia	Democratic	1980	Incumbent resigned September 6, 1988. New delegate elected. Democratic hold.	▌ ✓ Eni Faleomavaega (Democratic) 51.0%; ▌Tufele Lia (Independent) 49.0%
District of Columbia at-large	Walter Fauntroy	Democratic	1970	Incumbent re-elected.	▌ ✓ Walter Fauntroy (Democratic) 71.3%; ▌W. Ron Evans (Republican) 13.4%; ▌Alvin Frost (Independent) 8.1%; ▌David Dabney (Independent) 6.1%
Guam at-large	Ben Blaz	Republican	1986	Incumbent re-elected.	▌ ✓ Ben Blaz (Republican) 54.7%; ▌Vicente C. Pangelinan (Democratic) 45.3%
Puerto Rico at-large	Jaime Fuster	Popular Democratic/ Democratic	1984	Incumbent re-elected.	▌ ✓ Jaime Fuster (PPD/Democratic) 49.0%; ▌Pedro Rosselló (PNP/Democratic) 46.6%; ▌Luis Pío Sánchez Longo (PIP) 4.5%
U.S. Virgin Islands at-large	Ron de Lugo	Democratic	1972; 1978 (retired); 1980	Incumbent re-elected.	▌ ✓ Ron de Lugo (Democratic) 97.4%

== See also ==
- 1988 United States elections
  - 1988 United States gubernatorial elections
  - 1988 United States presidential election
  - 1988 United States Senate elections
- 100th United States Congress
- 101st United States Congress

== Works cited ==
- Abramson, Paul; Aldrich, John; Rohde, David (1995). Change and Continuity in the 1992 Elections. CQ Press. ISBN 0871878399.
- Moreland, Laurence; Steed, Robert; Baker, Tod, eds. (1991). The 1988 Presidential Election in the South: Continuity Amidst Change in Southern Party Politics. Praeger Publishers. ISBN 0275931455.
