= Harold Knight =

Harold Knight may refer to:

- Harold Knight (artist) (1874–1961), British painter
- Harold Knight (American football) (1932–2016), American college football coach
- Harold L. Knight (1911–1982), American politician
- H. M. Knight (Harold Murray Knight; 1919–2015), Australian economist

== See also ==
- Harry Knight (disambiguation)
