= Walter Conlon =

American politician (born 1947)

Member of the Iowa House of Representatives from the 76th district
- In office January 10, 1977 – January 9, 1983
- Preceded by: Richard F. Drake
- Succeeded by: Kyle Hummel

Personal details
- Born: February 20, 1947 (age 79) Jersey City, New Jersey, U.S.
- Party: Republican
- Spouse: Kristine Meyer (m. 1973)
- Children: 2
- Education: Loras College (BA); University of Iowa (MA, JD)
- Occupation: Politician, lawyer

Military service
- Allegiance: United States
- Branch/service: United States Army
- Years of service: 1969–1971

Walter Conlon (born February 20, 1947) is an American politician and lawyer.

He was born in Jersey City, New Jersey, to parents Walter and Anastasia Conlon. The younger Walter Conlon graduated from Loras College in 1969, and served in the United States Army until 1971. He subsequently enrolled at the University of Iowa to complete a Master of Arts degree, and earned his Juris Doctor from UI's College of Law in 1975. Conlon then practiced law with the Drake & Petersen and Mealy, Metcalf & Conlon firms in Muscatine.

Conlon served on the Iowa House of Representatives from January 10, 1977, to January 9, 1983, as a Republican legislator for District 76.
