= Harold L. Knight =

American politician (1911–1982)

Member of the Iowa House of Representatives from the 76th district
- In office January 9, 1967 – January 10, 1971
- Preceded by: Theodore Gleason
- Succeeded by: Bill Gluba

Personal details
- Born: February 10, 1911 Ames, Iowa
- Died: July 19, 1982 (aged 71) Calico Rock, Arkansas
- Party: Republican

Harold L. Knight (February 10, 1911 – July 19, 1982) was an American politician.

Born in Ames, Iowa to parents Charles D. and Mary Craven Knight on February 10, 1911, Harold Knight graduated from Ames High School in 1929, and earned his degree in agriculture at Iowa State University in 1937. Knight moved to Des Moines, where Anderson Erickson Dairy was headquartered, to work as a cottage cheese producer. He moved to Humboldt in 1947 to establish an eponymous cottage cheese company, Knight's Cottage Cheese.

Politically, Knight was affiliated with the Republican Party, and served in the Iowa House of Representatives for two terms, representing District 76 from January 9, 1967, to January 10, 1971.

Knight moved to Horseshoe Bend, Arkansas, in 1974, and died in Calico Rock on July 19, 1982.
