= Henry Knight =

Henry Knight may refer to:

== Politicians ==
- Henry Knight (Great Grimsby MP) (1728–1762), British Member of Parliament for Great Grimsby
- Henry Edmund Knight (1833–1917), British lord mayor for city of London.
- Henry Gally Knight (1786–1846), British politician
- Henry Foley Knight (1886–1960), British administrator and civil servant

== Others ==
- Henry Knight (bishop) (1859–1920), Bishop of Gibraltar in the Church of England
- Henry Knight (cricketer) (1796–1843), English cricketer
- Henry James Knight (1878–1955), English recipient of the Victoria Cross
- Henry Granger Knight (1878–1942), American chemist
- Henry Knight (rugby league), New Zealand international

== See also ==
- Harry Knight (disambiguation)
