= Iowa's 76th House of Representatives district =

American legislative district

House District 76
- Type: District of the Lower house
- Location: Iowa
- Representative: Derek Wulf
- Parent organization: Iowa General Assembly

The 76th District of the Iowa House of Representatives in the state of Iowa is composed of part of Black Hawk, Benton, and Tama counties.

== Current elected officials ==
Derek Wulf is the representative currently representing the district.

== Past representatives ==
The district has previously been represented by:

- William E. Gluba, 1971–1973
- Richard F. Drake, 1973–1977
- Walter Conlon, 1977–1983
- Perry K. Hummel, 1983–1989
- William J. Brand, 1989–1993
- Steven W. Churchill, 1993–1999
- Scott Raecker, 1999–2003
- Betty De Boef, 2003–2013
- David Maxwell, 2013–2023
- Derek Wulf, 2023–2027
- Matt Reisetter, 2027–
