= Harry Knight =

Harry Knight may refer to:

- Harry Knight (racing driver), American racecar driver
- Harry Knight (farmer) (1860–1935), New Zealand farmer, politician and racehorse owner
- Harry Knight (Canadian football) (born 1953), American football quarterback
- Harry Adam Knight, writer
- Harry Knight, character in A Pair of Blue Eyes

== See also ==
- Henry Knight (disambiguation)
- Harold Knight (disambiguation)
