= Theodore Gleason =

American politician (1904–1975)

Theodore Michael Gleason (April 4, 1904 – January 3, 1975) was an American politician.

Theodore Gleason was born in Blairsburg, Iowa, on April 4, 1904, to parents Michael J. and Alice Henning Gleason. After graduating from Blairsburg High School, Gleason attended the State College of Iowa. He married Dorothy Neel Gleason in 1934, and moved to Gilmore City. The couple raised six children, and Theodore variously worked as a rural schoolteacher, at a lumber yard, ran a movie theatre, and farmed until retirement in 1973. He died on January 3, 1975, at Pocahontas Community Hospital in Pocahontas, Iowa, aged 70.

Politically, Gleason was affiliated with the Democratic Party. He served on the Gilmore City city council prior to his election as a member of the Iowa House of Representatives. Gleason held the state house District 76 seat for one term, from January 11, 1965, to January 8, 1967.
