= Steven W. Churchill =

American politician (born 1963)

- Born: May 8, 1963 (age 63); Akron, Ohio, U.S.
- Education: Iowa State University
- Occupations: Politician, fundraising professional
- Political party: Republican

Steven W. Churchill (born May 8, 1963) is an American politician and fundraising professional. He served as a Republican member of the Iowa House of Representatives from 1993 to 1999.

== Early life ==
Steven W. Churchill was born May 8, 1963, in Akron, Ohio. His father was Wayne Churchill and his mother, Sue Churchill. He graduated from Iowa State University in Ames, Iowa, in 1985.

== Career ==
He served in the Iowa House of Representatives from 1993 to 1999. He is a co-founder and former President of The Bull Moose Club of Des Moines, Iowa, an organization of Republicans under the age of forty based in Des Moines, Iowa.

He was the founder and President of The Churchill Group from 1993 to 1997, a fundraising firm. He served as the Director of Major Gifts at Simpson College in Indianola, Iowa. He served as the Vice President of Development and Alumni Relations at Des Moines University in Des Moines, Iowa. He served as the Executive Director of the American Medical Association Foundation from 2007 to 2014.

He served as the President and Chief Executive Officer of the Associate of Healthcare Philanthropy in Falls Church, Virginia. He also served as the Eminent Supreme Archon of Sigma Alpha Epsilon until 2017.

He is the recipient of the Commander's Award for Public Service from the United States Department of the Army.

He is now the Chief of Staff at the Embassy of the United States of America in Beijing, China.

== Personal life ==
He has attended the Plymouth Congregational Church.
