= Bill Gluba =

American mayor (born 1942)

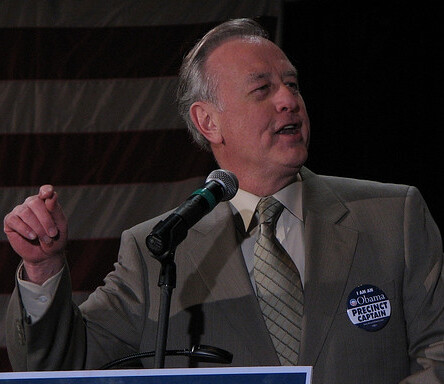
- Gluba in 2007

74th Mayor of Davenport, Iowa
- In office January 1, 2008 – January 6, 2016
- Preceded by: Ed Winborn
- Succeeded by: Frank Klipsch

Member of the Iowa Senate from the 41st district
- In office January 8, 1973 – January 9, 1977
- Preceded by: Earl G. Bass
- Succeeded by: Forrest F. Ashcraft

Member of the Iowa House of Representatives from the 76th district
- In office January 11, 1971 – January 7, 1973
- Preceded by: Harold L. Knight
- Succeeded by: Richard F. Drake

Personal details
- Born: October 7, 1942 (age 83) Davenport, Iowa
- Party: Democratic
- Spouse: Trish
- Children: 5
- Education: University of Iowa and St. Ambrose University

William E. Gluba (born October 7, 1942) is a former American politician who served as mayor of Davenport, Iowa from 2008 to 2016. He is a member of the Democratic Party.

== Early life and education ==
Gluba was born in Davenport, Iowa, on October 7, 1942. He received a bachelor's degree in political science from St. Ambrose University in Davenport. He later received a master's degree in political science from the University of Iowa. In 1963, he took part in the historic March on Washington for Jobs and Freedom.

== Political career ==
Gluba served in the Iowa House of Representatives from 1971 to 1972, and in the Iowa Senate from 1973 to 1976. From 1977 to 1980, Gluba served on the Scott County Board of Supervisors.

He has unsuccessfully run for Congress in Iowa's 1st Congressional District three times, first against Congressman Jim Leach in 1982 (Leach 59.2% - Gluba 40.8%) and again in 1988 (Leach 60.7% - Gluba 38.4%). In 2004 he was nominated to run against incumbent Congressman Jim Nussle and was defeated by a 55% to 44% margin.

In 2006, Nussle decided to not seek another term in Congress, but instead run for the office of Iowa governor as Tom Vilsack was not seeking another term for that office. Gluba, Rick Dickinson of Dubuque, and Bruce Braley had declared themselves candidates to be the representative for the Democratic leaning district that includes Dubuque, Davenport, and Waterloo as its largest cities. Braley later won the primary, and subsequently won the seat in the November 2006 general election.

On August 31, 2007, Gluba officially filed as a candidate for mayor of his hometown of Davenport, Iowa. He faced former mayor Phil Yerington and at-large Alderwoman Jamie Howard in the primary. On primary day, October 9, Gluba won, receiving 4,784 votes, or 45.33%; while Yerington finished second, receiving 3,945 votes, or 33.12%. A run-off election between Gluba and Yerington was held on November 6, which Gluba won with 10,544 votes or 62% percent. In 2009 and 2011 Gluba ran for a second and third term as mayor unopposed. In 2013, he won election to a fourth term with 65% of the vote. Gluba ran for a fifth mayoral term in 2015, but was defeated by newcomer Frank Klipsch who received 67% of the vote.

== Other activities ==
Gluba has also worked as a real estate broker with RE/MAX River Cities. Inc., Bettendorf, Iowa.
