= Jerry Yudelson =

- Born: Greenwich, Connecticut
- Education: Caltech
- Occupations: Author and environmentalist

Jerry Yudelson (born in Greenwich, Connecticut) is an environmentalist and author, best known for publishing 14 green building and sustainable design books since 2006. Yudelson’s work is focused on the long-term environmental impact that urban development has on climate change, resulting from greenhouse gas emissions caused by operating home and buildings.

== Academic achievements ==
Yudelson has a B.S. in engineering from the California Institute of Technology (Caltech), an A.M. in water resources engineering from Harvard University, and a Master Of Business Administration from the University of Oregon. He was a Rotary Foundation Fellow for International Understanding for his graduate studies in West Germany at the Technical University in Aachen. He was a U.S. Public Health Service Trainee in environmental engineering science for Ph.D. studies at Caltech.

== Environmentalism ==
Yudelson was a pioneer in organizing Earth Day activities in 1970 on the Caltech campus. He taught some of the first university courses in the U.S. in the new field of environmental studies, while at the University of California, Santa Cruz. In 1972, he organized community opposition to a proposed convention center on the Monterey Bay headlands at Lighthouse Point in Santa Cruz, resulting in the cancellation of the project and eventually the creation of Lighthouse Field State Beach. In a 2014 article in The Guardian, Yudelson likened sustainable architecture to sex, saying, “It’s all about performance, not promise. Show me your numbers."

== Professional achievements ==
In 1978, California Governor Jerry Brown appointed Yudelson as director of the SolarCal Office. In 1979, SolarCal produced the first state-level solar energy development plan in the U.S.

In 2011, Wired magazine anointed Yudelson as the "Godfather of Green".

In 2011, Yudelson was named to the prestigious inaugural class of LEED Fellows by the Green Business Certification Inc. (GBCI).

In 2014 and 2015, Yudelson served as president of the Green Building Initiative, a national nonprofit and originator of the Green Globes green building rating system.

== Books ==
Reinventing Green Building: Why Certification Systems Aren't Working and What We Can Do About It (2016)	ISBN 978-0865718159
The World's Greenest Buildings: Promise Versus Performance in Sustainable Design (2013)	ISBN 978-1138409071
Dry Run: Preventing the Next Urban Water Crisis (2010)	ISBN 978-0865716704
Sustainable Retail Development: New Success Strategies (2009)	ISBN 978-9048127818
Greening Existing Buildings (2009)	ISBN 978-0071638326
Green Building Trends: Europe (2009)	ISBN 978-1597264761
Green Building through Integrated Design (2008)	ISBN 978-0071546010
Choosing Green: The Home Buyer's Guide to Good Green Homes (2008)	ISBN 978-0865716100
Green Building: A to Z (2007)	ISBN 978-0865715721
The Green Building Revolution (2007)	ISBN 978-1597261784
Marketing Green Building Services: Strategies for Success (2007)	ISBN 978-0849393815
Developing Green: Strategies for Success (2006)	ISBN 978-0971895577
The Insider’s Guide to Marketing Green Buildings. Society for Marketing Professional Services	ISBN 978-0976501909
