= Wheeler Mellette Tillman =

American politician

Member of the South Carolina House of Representatives for the 117th district
- In office 1972–1976

Personal details
- Born: August 25, 1941 (age 85) Charleston, South Carolina, United States
- Died: November 15, 2021 (aged 80) North Charleston, South Carolina, United States
- Party: Democratic
- Occupation: lawyer

Wheeler Mellette Tillman (born August 25, 1941 – November 15, 2021) was an American politician in the state of South Carolina. He served in the South Carolina House of Representatives as a member of the Democratic Party from 1972 to 1976, representing Charleston County, South Carolina. He was a lawyer in Charleston. He died in North Charleston, South Carolina at the age of 80.
