= 1988 New Hampshire gubernatorial election =

- November 6, 1988

Nominee	Judd Gregg	Paul McEachern
Party	Republican	Democratic
Popular vote	267,064	172,543
Percentage	60.45%	39.05%
- Gregg: 40–50% 50–60% 60–70% 70–80% 80–90% >90% McEachern: 50–60% 60–70%
Governor before election
John Sununu
Republican
Elected Governor
Judd Gregg
Republican

The 1988 New Hampshire gubernatorial election took place on November 6, 1988. Incumbent Governor John Sununu did not run for re-election, and was succeeded by U.S. Representative Judd Gregg.

As of 2020, this marks the most recent time that Republicans won the races for Governor and for President concurrently.

== Election results ==
New Hampshire gubernatorial election, 1988
Party	Candidate	Votes	%	±%
Republican	Judd Gregg	267,064	60.45%	▲6.73
Democratic	Paul McEachern	172,543	39.05%	▼7.23
Libertarian	Howard L. Wilson	2,216	0.50%	N/A
Republican hold		Swing		
