= Kyle Hummel =

American politician (1935–2024)

Member of the Iowa House of Representatives
- In office January 8, 1979 – January 8, 1989

Personal details
- Born: July 23, 1935 Woodbury County, Iowa, U.S.
- Died: June 24, 2024 (aged 88)
- Party: Republican
- Spouse: Shirley
- Children: 6
- Parents: Perry Joseph Hummel (father); Mary Paisley (mother)
- Occupation: Businessman, real estate broker

Perry Kyle Hummel (July 23, 1935 – June 24, 2024) was an American politician in the state of Iowa.

Hummel was born in Woodbury County, Iowa, the son of Perry Joseph and Mary (née Paisley) Hummel, and was a lifelong resident of Vinton, Iowa. After growing up working on the family farm, he owned tiling and real estate businesses. He served in the Iowa House of Representatives from 1979 to 1989, as a Republican.
