= List of new members of the 97th United States Congress =

The 97th United States Congress began on January 3, 1981. There were 15 new senators (two Democrats, 13 Republicans) and 73 new representatives (21 Democrats, 52 Republicans), as well as two new delegates (both Democrats), at the start of the first session. Additionally, two senators (one Democrat, one Republican) and nine representatives (six Democrats, three Republicans) took office on various dates in order to fill vacancies during the 97th Congress before it ended on January 3, 1983.

== Senate ==
=== Took office January 3, 1981 ===
State	Image	Senator	Seniority	Switched party	Prior background	Birth year	Ref
Alaska		Frank Murkowski (R)	15th (100th overall)	Yes; Replaced Mike Gravel (D), who was defeated in a primary	Alaska Commissioner of Economic Development; U.S. Coast Guard	1933	
Connecticut		Chris Dodd (D)	4th (89th overall)	No; Open seat; replaced Abraham Ribicoff (D)	U.S. House of Representatives (Note: Elected to the 94th Congress, serving from 1975 to 1981 in Connecticut's 2nd district.); U.S. Army Reserve	1944	
Georgia		Mack Mattingly (R)	12th (97th overall)	Yes; Defeated Herman Talmadge (D)	Chair of the Georgia Republican Party; U.S. Air Force	1931	
Idaho		Steve Symms (R)	2nd (87th overall)	Yes; Defeated Frank Church (D)	U.S. House of Representatives (Note: Elected to the 93rd Congress, serving from 1973 to 1981 in Idaho's 1st district.); U.S. Marine Corps First Lieutenant	1938	
Illinois		Alan J. Dixon (D)	10th (95th overall)	No; Open seat; replaced Adlai Stevenson III (D)	Illinois Secretary of State; Illinois Treasurer; Illinois Senate; Illinois House of Representatives; U.S. Navy	1927	
Indiana		Dan Quayle (R)	6th (91st overall)	Yes; Defeated Birch Bayh (D)	U.S. House of Representatives (Note: Elected to the 95th Congress, serving from 1977 to 1981 in Indiana's 4th district.); U.S. Army Sergeant	1947	
Iowa		Chuck Grassley (R)	5th (90th overall)	Yes; Defeated John Culver (D)	U.S. House of Representatives (Note: Elected to the 94th Congress, serving from 1975 to 1981 in Iowa's 3rd district.); Iowa House of Representatives	1933	
New York		Al D'Amato (R)	8th (93rd overall)	No; Defeated Jacob Javits (R) in a primary (Note: Javits ran in the general election as nominee of the Liberal Party and was subsequently defeated by D'Amato.)	Nassau County Board of Supervisors; Hempstead Presiding Supervisor	1937	
North Carolina		John Porter East (R)	11th (96th overall)	Yes; Defeated Robert Burren Morgan (D)	Professor	1931	
North Dakota		Mark Andrews (R)	1st (86th overall)	No; Open seat; replaced Milton Young (R)	U.S. House of Representatives (Note: Elected to the 88th Congress, serving from 1963 to 1981 in North Dakota's at-large district.)	1926	
Oklahoma		Don Nickles (R)	14th (99th overall)	No; Open seat; replaced Henry Bellmon (R)	Oklahoma Senate; Oklahoma National Guard	1948	
Pennsylvania		Arlen Specter (R)	9th (94th overall)	No (Note: Specter joined the Democratic Party in April 2009, during the 111th Congress.); Open seat; replaced Richard Schweiker (R)	District Attorney of Philadelphia; Assistant counsel to the Warren Commission; U.S. Air Force First Lieutenant	1930	
South Dakota		James Abdnor (R)	3rd (88th overall)	Yes; Defeated George McGovern (D)	U.S. House of Representatives (Note: Elected to the 93rd Congress, serving from 1973 to 1981 in South Dakota's 2nd district.); Lieutenant Governor of South Dakota; South Dakota Senate; U.S. Army	1923	
Washington		Slade Gorton (R)	13th (98th overall)	Yes; Defeated Warren Magnuson (D)	Attorney General of Washington; Washington House of Representatives; U.S. Air Force Reserve Colonel	1928	
Wisconsin		Bob Kasten (R)	7th (92nd overall)	Yes; Defeated Gaylord Nelson (D)	U.S. House of Representatives (Note: Elected to the 94th Congress, serving from 1975 to 1981 in Wisconsin's 9th district.); Wisconsin Senate; Wisconsin Air National Guard	1942	

=== Took office during the 97th Congress ===
State	Image	Senator	Took office	Switched party	Prior background	Birth year	Ref
New Jersey		Nicholas F. Brady (R)	April 12, 1982	Yes; Appointed; replaced Harrison A. Williams (D)	Businessman	1930	
New Jersey		Frank Lautenberg (D)	December 27, 1982	Yes; Open seat; replaced Nicholas F. Brady (R) (Note: In New Jersey, Brady did not run to finish the final two months of the current term.)	Port Authority of New York and New Jersey; U.S. Army Technician	1924	

== House of Representatives ==
=== Took office January 3, 1981 ===
District	Representative	Switched party	Prior background	Birth year	Ref
Alabama 6	Albert L. Smith Jr. (R)	No	Insurance agent	1931	
California 1	Eugene A. Chappie (R)	Yes	State Assemblyman	1920	
California 11	Tom Lantos (D)	Yes	Professor	1928	
California 21	Bobbi Fiedler (R)	Yes	Education official	1937	
California 31	Mervyn Dymally (D)	No	Lieutenant Governor of California	1926	
California 35	David Dreier (R)	Yes	Philanthropist	1952	
California 41	Bill Lowery (R)	No	City Councilor	1947	
California 42	Duncan L. Hunter (R)	Yes	U.S. Army First Lieutenant	1948	
Colorado 4	Hank Brown (R)	No	State Senator	1940	
Connecticut 2	Sam Gejdenson (D)	No	State Representative	1948	
Connecticut 3	Lawrence J. DeNardis (R)	Yes	State Senator	1938	
Florida 5	Bill McCollum (R)	No	County Party Chair	1944	
Florida 12	Clay Shaw (R)	Yes	Mayor of Fort Lauderdale	1939	
Georgia 2	Charles Floyd Hatcher (D)	No	State Representative	1939	
Idaho 1	Larry Craig (R)	No	State Senator	1945	
Illinois 1	Harold Washington (D)	No	State Senator	1922	
Illinois 2	Gus Savage (D)	No	Journalist	1925	
Illinois 16	Lynn Morley Martin (R)	No	State Senator	1939	
Indiana 3	John P. Hiler (R)	Yes	Marketing director	1953	
Indiana 4	Dan Coats (R)	No	Congressional staffer	1943	
Iowa 3	T. Cooper Evans (R)	No	State Representative	1924	
Kansas 1	Pat Roberts (R)	No	Congressional staffer	1936	
Kentucky 5	Hal Rogers (R)	No	Commonwealth Attorney	1937	
Louisiana 4	Buddy Roemer (D)	No	Banker	1943	
Maryland 1	Roy Dyson (D)	Yes	State Delegate	1948	
Massachusetts 4	Barney Frank (D)	No	State Representative	1940	
Michigan 6	James Whitney Dunn (R)	Yes	Businessman	1943	
Michigan 14	Dennis Hertel (D)	No	Lawyer	1948	
Minnesota 6	Vin Weber (R)	Yes	Newspaper publisher	1952	
Missouri 8	Wendell Bailey (R)	Yes	State Representative	1940	
Missouri 10	Bill Emerson (R)	Yes	Consultant	1938	
Nebraska 2	Hal Daub (R)	Yes	Lawyer	1941	
New Hampshire 2	Judd Gregg (R)	No	Executive Councilor	1947	
New Jersey 4	Chris Smith (R)	Yes	Nonprofit executive	1953	
New Jersey 7	Marge Roukema (R)	Yes	School Board Member	1929	
New Jersey 15	Bernard J. Dwyer (D)	No	State Senator	1921	
New Mexico 2	Joe Skeen (R)	Yes	State Party Chair	1927	
New York 3	Gregory W. Carman (R)	Yes	Town Councilor	1937	
New York 5	Raymond J. McGrath (R)	No	State Assemblyman	1942	
New York 6	John LeBoutillier (R)	Yes	Campaign coordinator	1953	
New York 16	Chuck Schumer (D)	No	State Assemblyman	1950	
New York 17	Guy Molinari (R)	Yes	State Assemblyman	1928	
New York 30	David O'Brien Martin (R)	No	State Assemblyman	1944	
New York 32	George C. Wortley (R)	Yes	Business executive	1926	
North Carolina 6	Walter E. Johnston III (R)	Yes	Lawyer	1936	
North Carolina 11	Bill Hendon (R)	Yes	Businessman	1944	
North Dakota at-large	Byron Dorgan (D–NPL)	Yes	North Dakota Tax Commissioner	1942	
Ohio 6	Bob McEwen (R)	No	State Representative	1950	
Ohio 9	Ed Weber (R)	Yes	Law professor	1931	
Ohio 12	Bob Shamansky (D)	Yes	Lawyer	1927	
Ohio 22	Dennis E. Eckart (D)	No	State Representative	1950	
Oklahoma 4	Dave McCurdy (D)	No	Assistant Attorney General of Oklahoma	1950	
Oregon 2	Denny Smith (R)	Yes	Flight engineer	1938	
Oregon 3	Ron Wyden (D)	No	Gerontology professor	1949	
Pennsylvania 1	Thomas M. Foglietta (D)	No	City Councillor	1928	
Pennsylvania 8	James K. Coyne III (R)	Yes	Business executive	1946	
Pennsylvania 11	James Nelligan (R)	Yes	Federal government official	1929	
Pennsylvania 14	William J. Coyne (D)	No	City Councillor	1936	
Rhode Island 2	Claudine Schneider (R)	Yes	Director of the CLF	1947	
South Carolina 1	Thomas F. Hartnett (R)	Yes	State Senator	1941	
South Carolina 6	John Light Napier (R)	Yes	Congressional staffer	1947	
South Dakota 2	Clint Roberts (R)	No	State Senator	1935	
Texas 4	Ralph Hall (D)	No	State Senator	1923	
Texas 8	Jack Fields (R)	Yes	Lawyer	1952	
Texas 14	Bill Patman (D)	No	State Senator	1927	
Utah 1	Jim Hansen (R)	Yes	State House Speaker	1932	
Virginia 3	Thomas J. Bliley Jr. (R)	Yes	Mayor of Richmond	1932	
Virginia 8	Stanford Parris (R)	Yes	U.S. Representative (Note: Previously elected to the 93rd Congress, serving from 1973 to 1975.)	1929	
Virginia 10	Frank Wolf (R)	Yes	U.S. DOI official	1939	
Washington 4	Sid Morrison (R)	Yes	State Senator	1933	
West Virginia 2	Cleve Benedict (R)	Yes	State Party Chair	1935	
West Virginia 3	Mick Staton (R)	Yes	Banker	1940	
Wisconsin 3	Steve Gunderson (R)	Yes	State Assemblyman	1951	

==== Non-voting delegates ====
District	Delegate	Switched party	Prior background	Birth year	Ref
American Samoa at-large	Fofō Iosefa Fiti Sunia (D)	New seat	Territorial Senator	1937	
U.S. Virgin Islands at-large	Ron de Lugo (D)	Yes	U.S. Delegate (Note: Previously elected to the 93rd Congress, serving from 1973 to 1979.)	1930	

=== Took office during the 97th Congress ===
District	Representative	Took office	Switched party	Prior background	Birth year	Ref
Michigan 4	Mark D. Siljander (R)	April 21, 1981	No	State Representative	1951	
Maryland 5	Steny Hoyer (D)	May 19, 1981	No	State Senate President	1939	
Ohio 4	Mike Oxley (R)	June 25, 1981	No	State Representative	1944	
Mississippi 4	Wayne Dowdy (D)	July 7, 1981	Yes	Mayor of McComb	1943	
Pennsylvania 3	Joseph F. Smith (D)	July 21, 1981	No	State Senator	1920	
Connecticut 1	Barbara B. Kennelly (D)	January 12, 1982	No	Connecticut Secretary of State	1936	
Ohio 17	Jean Spencer Ashbrook (R)	June 29, 1982	No	None	1934	
California 30	Matthew G. Martínez (D)	July 13, 1982	No	State Assemblyman	1929	
Indiana 1	Katie Hall (D)	November 2, 1982	No	State Senator	1938	

== See also ==
- List of United States representatives in the 97th Congress
- List of United States senators in the 97th Congress

== Notes ==
Preceded by New members of the 96th Congress	New members of the 97th Congress; 1981–1983	Succeeded by New members of the 98th Congress
