= 1981 United States House of Representatives elections =

There were five special elections in 1981 to the United States House of Representatives:

== List of elections ==
Elections are listed by date and district.

District	Incumbent			This race	
District	Member	Party	First elected	Results	Candidates
Michigan 4	David Stockman	Republican	1976	Incumbent resigned January 27, 1981, to become Director of the Office of Management and Budget. New member elected April 21, 1981. Republican hold.	▌ ✓ Mark D. Siljander (Republican) 68.5%; ▌Johnie Rodebush (Democratic) 29.0%; ▌Bette Erwin (Libertarian) 1.5%; ▌Robert C. Drenkhahn (American Independent) 1.0%
Maryland 5	Gladys Spellman	Democratic	1974	Incapacitated since last Congress and seat declared vacant February 24, 1981. New member elected May 19, 1981. Democratic hold.	▌ ✓ Steny Hoyer (Democratic) 55.8%; ▌Audrey E. Scott (Republican) 44.2%
Ohio 4	Tennyson Guyer	Republican	1972	Incumbent died April 12, 1981. New member elected June 25, 1981. Republican hold.	▌ ✓ Mike Oxley (Republican) 50.2%; ▌Dale Locker (Democratic) 49.8%
Mississippi 4	Jon Hinson	Republican	1978	Incumbent resigned April 13, 1981. New member elected July 7, 1981. Democratic gain.	▌ ✓ Wayne Dowdy (Democratic) 50.4%; ▌Liles Williams (Republican) 49.6%
Pennsylvania 3	Raymond Lederer	Democratic	1976	Incumbent resigned April 29, 1981, before a planned expulsion vote, having been convicted of bribery in the Abscam sting operation. New member elected July 21, 1981. Democratic hold.	▌ ✓ Joseph F. Smith (Democratic) 52.5%; ▌David B. Glancey (Democratic) 42.8%; ▌Charles Duncan (Consumer) 4.0%; ▌David A. Dorn (Libertarian) 0.7%
