= 1988 United States presidential election in Mississippi =

- November 8, 1988

Nominee	George H. W. Bush	Michael Dukakis
Party	Republican	Democratic
Home state	Texas	Massachusetts
Running mate	Dan Quayle	Lloyd Bentsen
Electoral vote	7	0
Popular vote	557,890	363,921
Percentage	59.89%	39.07%

Bush
40–50%
50–60%
60–70%
70–80%
Dukakis
50–60%
60–70%
70–80%
President before election
Ronald Reagan
Republican
Elected President
George H. W. Bush
Republican

The 1988 United States presidential election in Mississippi took place on November 8, 1988. All fifty states and the District of Columbia, were part of the 1988 United States presidential election. Mississippi voters chose seven electors to the Electoral College, which selected the president and vice president.

Mississippi was won by incumbent Vice President George H. W. Bush, running with U.S. Senator Dan Quayle, against Governor Michael Dukakis, running with U.S Senator Lloyd Bentsen.

Notably, however, George County, in Mississippi's Pine Belt, gave former Ku Klux Klan Grand Wizard David Duke his largest vote share of any county in the country (about 4%). George County also gave third parties in the aggregate their largest vote share of any county in the country.

As of the 2024 presidential election, this is the last election in which Adams County, Kemper County, Washington County, and Leflore County voted for the Republican presidential nominee; and the last in which Hinds County, the most populous in the state, gave a Republican an outright majority.

== Background ==
Thad Cochran's victory in the 1978 election made him the first Republican elected to the United States Senate from Mississippi since the end of Reconstruction. However, the Democrats maintained control over all state-level offices.

== Campaign ==
The racial composition of the Democratic primary was 55% white and 45% black. Gore won 64% of the white vote, and 44% of white voters participated in the Republican primary.

Dukakis was the first presidential candidate to visit the Neshoba County Fair since Ronald Reagan during the 1980 election. Among white voters, 76% supported Bush while 23% supported Dukakis.

Democratic nominee Wayne Dowdy lost in the concurrent U.S. Senate election resulting in Mississippi having two Republican senators for the first time since Reconstruction. However, the Democrats controlled four of the state's five seats in the United States House of Representatives.

Harry Allen, Rhesa Barksdale, Robbie Hughes, Henry Paris, Fred Reeder, Michael Allred, and Ed Weeks were the Republican electors that cast their ballots for Bush and Quayle. Allred was selected to replace John Palmer as Palmer was unable to cast his ballot.

=== Polling ===
Poll source	Date(s) administered	Sample size	Margin of error	George Bush Republican	Michael Dukakis Democratic	Other / Undecided
Mason-Dixon Polling & Strategy	June 9–12, 1988			50%	39%	11%
Mason-Dixon Polling & Strategy	August 1–3, 1988			50%	43%	7%

== Results ==
1988 United States presidential election in Mississippi
Party	Candidate	Votes	Percentage	Electoral votes
Republican	George H. W. Bush	557,890	59.89%	7
Democratic	Michael Dukakis	363,921	39.07%	0
Independent	David Duke	4,232	0.45%	0
Libertarian	Ron Paul	3,329	0.36%	0
Independent	Lenora Fulani	2,155	0.23%	0
Totals		931,527	100.00%	7

=== Results by county ===
County	George H.W. Bush Republican		Michael Dukakis Democratic		David Duke Independent		Ron Paul Libertarian		Leonora Fulani Independent		Margin		Total votes cast
County	#	%	#	%	#	%	#	%	#	%	#	%	Total votes cast
Adams	8,116	50.74%	7,732	48.34%	96	0.60%	25	0.16%	25	0.16%	384	2.40%	15,994
Alcorn	6,641	54.88%	5,335	44.08%	38	0.31%	73	0.60%	15	0.12%	1,306	10.80%	12,102
Amite	3,333	53.88%	2,834	45.81%	14	0.23%	5	0.08%	0	0.00%	499	8.07%	6,186
Attala	4,524	59.87%	2,997	39.66%	21	0.28%	7	0.09%	7	0.09%	1,527	20.21%	7,556
Benton	1,565	47.30%	1,718	51.92%	20	0.60%	3	0.09%	3	0.09%	-153	-4.62%	3,309
Bolivar	6,105	43.34%	7,606	54.00%	101	0.72%	204	1.45%	69	0.49%	-1,501	-10.66%	14,085
Calhoun	3,375	61.55%	2,086	38.04%	7	0.13%	11	0.20%	4	0.07%	1,289	23.51%	5,483
Carroll	2,628	62.51%	1,560	37.11%	1	0.02%	11	0.26%	4	0.10%	1,068	25.40%	4,204
Chickasaw	3,390	55.35%	2,713	44.29%	15	0.24%	1	0.02%	6	0.10%	677	11.06%	6,125
Choctaw	2,297	62.98%	1,335	36.61%	10	0.27%	2	0.05%	3	0.08%	962	26.37%	3,647
Claiborne	1,233	28.35%	3,083	70.89%	12	0.28%	6	0.14%	15	0.34%	-1,850	-42.54%	4,349
Clarke	4,522	63.71%	2,576	36.29%	0	0.00%	0	0.00%	0	0.00%	1,946	27.42%	7,098
Clay	3,645	48.26%	3,849	50.96%	39	0.52%	10	0.13%	10	0.13%	-204	-2.70%	7,553
Coahoma	4,939	43.79%	6,139	54.43%	86	0.76%	76	0.67%	38	0.34%	-1,200	-10.64%	11,278
Copiah	5,100	54.64%	4,175	44.73%	28	0.30%	23	0.25%	8	0.09%	925	9.91%	9,334
Covington	4,005	60.38%	2,591	39.06%	24	0.36%	7	0.11%	6	0.09%	1,414	21.32%	6,633
DeSoto	14,681	72.50%	5,449	26.91%	57	0.28%	43	0.21%	20	0.10%	9,232	45.59%	20,250
Forrest	14,249	66.84%	6,953	32.62%	52	0.24%	38	0.18%	26	0.12%	7,296	34.22%	21,318
Franklin	2,376	59.97%	1,563	39.45%	14	0.35%	6	0.15%	3	0.08%	813	20.52%	3,962
George	4,545	58.40%	2,435	31.29%	328	4.21%	253	3.25%	221	2.84%	2,110	27.11%	7,782
Greene	2,837	57.08%	1,637	32.94%	195	3.90%	187	3.74%	144	2.88%	1,200	24.14%	4,970
Grenada	5,352	59.10%	3,683	40.67%	4	0.04%	9	0.10%	8	0.09%	1,669	18.43%	9,056
Hancock	7,763	66.42%	3,760	32.17%	104	0.90%	31	0.27%	29	0.25%	4,003	34.25%	11,687
Harrison	32,892	68.88%	14,439	30.24%	191	0.40%	162	0.34%	70	0.15%	18,453	38.64%	47,754
Hinds	52,749	55.52%	41,058	43.22%	593	0.62%	315	0.33%	291	0.31%	11,691	12.30%	95,006
Holmes	2,737	33.68%	5,350	65.84%	18	0.22%	8	0.10%	13	0.16%	-2,613	-32.16%	8,126
Humphreys	2,018	42.98%	2,644	56.32%	12	0.26%	11	0.23%	10	0.21%	-626	-13.34%	4,695
Issaquena	424	43.58%	511	52.52%	17	1.75%	11	1.13%	10	1.03%	-87	-8.94%	973
Itawamba	4,535	58.95%	3,143	40.86%	7	0.09%	6	0.08%	2	0.03%	1,392	18.09%	7,693
Jackson	29,830	73.90%	10,328	25.59%	85	0.21%	76	0.19%	45	0.11%	19,502	48.31%	40,364
Jasper	3,368	51.25%	3,184	48.45%	8	0.12%	5	0.08%	7	0.11%	184	2.80%	6,572
Jefferson	702	20.64%	2,693	79.18%	1	0.03%	1	0.03%	4	0.12%	-1,991	-58.54%	3,401
Jefferson Davis	2,745	47.92%	2,948	51.47%	20	0.35%	6	0.10%	9	0.16%	-203	-3.55%	5,728
Jones	16,764	69.07%	7,383	30.42%	65	0.27%	27	0.11%	33	0.14%	9,381	38.65%	24,272
Kemper	2,128	50.25%	2,069	48.85%	16	0.38%	12	0.28%	10	0.24%	59	1.40%	4,235
Lafayette	5,841	59.29%	3,967	40.27%	18	0.18%	17	0.17%	9	0.09%	1,874	19.02%	9,852
Lamar	9,145	77.86%	2,535	21.58%	42	0.36%	13	0.11%	11	0.09%	6,610	56.28%	11,746
Lauderdale	18,302	68.99%	7,967	30.03%	77	0.29%	138	0.52%	45	0.17%	10,335	38.96%	26,529
Lawrence	3,682	59.17%	2,517	40.45%	12	0.19%	6	0.10%	6	0.10%	1,165	18.72%	6,223
Leake	4,168	59.86%	2,787	40.03%	2	0.03%	3	0.04%	3	0.04%	1,381	19.83%	6,963
Lee	13,767	66.42%	6,604	31.86%	56	0.27%	261	1.26%	40	0.19%	7,163	34.56%	20,728
Leflore	6,409	50.95%	5,830	46.35%	129	1.03%	147	1.17%	64	0.51%	579	4.60%	12,579
Lincoln	8,710	65.50%	4,534	34.10%	42	0.32%	5	0.04%	6	0.05%	4,176	31.40%	13,297
Lowndes	11,258	64.96%	5,993	34.58%	29	0.17%	27	0.16%	24	0.14%	5,265	30.38%	17,331
Madison	11,399	57.50%	8,242	41.57%	99	0.50%	41	0.21%	44	0.22%	3,157	15.93%	19,825
Marion	7,019	61.87%	4,240	37.38%	50	0.44%	17	0.15%	18	0.16%	2,779	24.49%	11,344
Marshall	4,668	39.72%	6,982	59.42%	47	0.40%	32	0.27%	22	0.19%	-2,314	-19.70%	11,751
Monroe	6,447	57.70%	4,669	41.79%	33	0.30%	14	0.13%	10	0.09%	1,778	15.91%	11,173
Montgomery	2,504	56.79%	1,893	42.93%	6	0.14%	4	0.09%	2	0.05%	611	13.86%	4,409
Neshoba	6,363	68.08%	2,942	31.48%	19	0.20%	17	0.18%	6	0.06%	3,421	36.60%	9,347
Newton	5,658	70.70%	2,332	29.14%	6	0.07%	5	0.06%	2	0.02%	3,326	41.56%	8,003
Noxubee	1,870	40.38%	2,722	58.78%	17	0.37%	12	0.26%	10	0.22%	-852	-18.40%	4,631
Oktibbeha	7,126	57.99%	5,100	41.50%	19	0.15%	22	0.18%	22	0.18%	2,026	16.49%	12,289
Panola	5,382	50.46%	5,222	48.96%	28	0.26%	17	0.16%	16	0.15%	160	1.50%	10,665
Pearl River	10,220	71.30%	3,939	27.48%	124	0.87%	33	0.23%	17	0.12%	6,281	43.82%	14,333
Perry	2,983	68.62%	1,326	30.50%	27	0.62%	6	0.14%	5	0.12%	1,657	38.12%	4,347
Pike	7,637	53.63%	6,531	45.87%	43	0.30%	18	0.13%	10	0.07%	1,106	7.76%	14,239
Pontotoc	4,939	63.81%	2,772	35.81%	17	0.22%	11	0.14%	1	0.01%	2,167	28.00%	7,740
Prentiss	4,348	55.09%	3,429	43.45%	43	0.54%	45	0.57%	27	0.34%	919	11.64%	7,892
Quitman	1,832	42.11%	2,497	57.39%	10	0.23%	4	0.09%	8	0.18%	-665	-15.28%	4,351
Rankin	22,937	78.41%	6,201	21.20%	46	0.16%	39	0.13%	31	0.11%	16,736	57.21%	29,254
Scott	5,522	65.06%	2,939	34.63%	15	0.18%	6	0.07%	6	0.07%	2,583	30.43%	8,488
Sharkey	1,277	43.00%	1,609	54.18%	35	1.18%	27	0.91%	22	0.74%	-332	-11.18%	2,970
Simpson	6,151	66.69%	3,016	32.70%	25	0.27%	26	0.28%	5	0.05%	3,135	33.99%	9,223
Smith	4,573	72.76%	1,660	26.41%	36	0.57%	13	0.21%	3	0.05%	2,913	46.35%	6,285
Stone	3,007	66.84%	1,452	32.27%	26	0.58%	13	0.29%	1	0.02%	1,555	34.57%	4,499
Sunflower	4,362	46.96%	4,898	52.73%	14	0.15%	12	0.13%	3	0.03%	-536	-5.77%	9,289
Tallahatchie	2,633	47.47%	2,881	51.94%	15	0.27%	15	0.27%	3	0.05%	-248	-4.47%	5,547
Tate	4,553	61.12%	2,872	38.56%	10	0.13%	9	0.12%	5	0.07%	1,681	22.56%	7,449
Tippah	4,593	60.41%	2,958	38.91%	20	0.26%	15	0.20%	17	0.22%	1,635	21.50%	7,603
Tishomingo	3,646	51.70%	3,378	47.90%	14	0.20%	12	0.17%	2	0.03%	268	3.80%	7,052
Tunica	896	36.87%	1,510	62.14%	18	0.74%	3	0.12%	3	0.12%	-614	-25.27%	2,430
Union	5,511	64.15%	3,044	35.43%	15	0.17%	12	0.14%	9	0.10%	2,467	28.72%	8,591
Walthall	3,103	56.40%	2,354	42.78%	29	0.53%	11	0.20%	5	0.09%	749	13.62%	5,502
Warren	12,507	62.01%	7,437	36.87%	79	0.39%	68	0.34%	79	0.39%	5,070	25.14%	20,170
Washington	10,229	49.45%	10,222	49.41%	84	0.41%	87	0.42%	65	0.31%	7	0.04%	20,687
Wayne	4,496	60.64%	2,889	38.97%	12	0.16%	12	0.16%	5	0.07%	1,607	21.67%	7,414
Webster	3,061	66.08%	1,550	33.46%	14	0.30%	5	0.11%	2	0.04%	1,511	32.62%	4,632
Wilkinson	1,528	36.18%	2,678	63.41%	6	0.14%	9	0.21%	2	0.05%	-1,150	-27.23%	4,223
Winston	5,317	57.61%	3,851	41.73%	15	0.16%	28	0.30%	18	0.20%	1,466	15.88%	9,229
Yalobusha	2,660	52.23%	2,402	47.16%	19	0.37%	7	0.14%	5	0.10%	258	5.07%	5,093
Yazoo	5,538	48.03%	4,989	43.27%	391	3.39%	314	2.72%	298	2.58%	549	4.76%	11,530
Totals	557,890	59.89%	363,921	39.07%	4,232	0.45%	3,329	0.36%	2,155	0.23%	193,969	20.82%	931,527

==== Counties that flipped from Republican to Democratic ====
- Benton
- Clay
- Issaquena
- Jefferson Davis
- Sunflower
- Tallahatchie

== See also ==
- Presidency of George H. W. Bush

== Works cited ==
- Black, Earl; Black, Merle (1992). The Vital South: How Presidents Are Elected. Harvard University Press. ISBN 0674941306.
- Moreland, Laurence; Steed, Robert; Baker, Tod, eds. (1991). The 1988 Presidential Election in the South: Continuity Amidst Change in Southern Party Politics. Praeger Publishers. ISBN 0275931455.
