= List of United States representatives in the 97th Congress =

This is a complete list of United States representatives during the 97th United States Congress listed by seniority.

As an historical article, the districts and party affiliations listed reflect those during the 97th Congress (January 3, 1981 – January 3, 1983). Seats and party affiliations on similar lists for other congresses will be different for certain members.

Seniority depends on the date on which members were sworn into office. Since many members are sworn in on the same day, subsequent ranking is based on previous congressional service of the individual and then by alphabetical order by the last name of the representative.

Committee chairmanship in the House is often associated with seniority. However, party leadership is typically not associated with seniority.

Note: The "*" indicates that the representative/delegate may have served one or more non-consecutive terms while in the House of Representatives of the United States Congress.

== U.S. House seniority list ==
U.S. House seniority
Rank	Representative	Party	District	Seniority date (Previous service, if any)	No.# of term(s)	Notes
1	Jamie Whitten	D	MS-01	November 4, 1941	21st term	Dean of the House
2	Charles Melvin Price	D	IL-23	January 3, 1945	19th term	
3	Charles Edward Bennett	D	FL-03	January 3, 1949	17th term	
4	Richard Walker Bolling	D	MO-05	January 3, 1949	17th term	Left the House in 1983.
5	Carl D. Perkins	D	KY-07	January 3, 1949	17th term	
6	Peter W. Rodino	D	NJ-10	January 3, 1949	17th term	
7	Clement J. Zablocki	D	WI-04	January 3, 1949	17th term	
8	Edward Boland	D	MA-02	January 3, 1953	15th term	
9	Jack Brooks	D	TX-09	January 3, 1953	15th term	
10	Lawrence H. Fountain	D	NC-02	January 3, 1953	15th term	Left the House in 1983.
11	Tip O'Neill	D	MA-08	January 3, 1953	15th term	Speaker of the House
12	John J. Rhodes	R	AZ-01	January 3, 1953	15th term	Left the House in 1983.
13	William Natcher	D	KY-02	August 1, 1953	15th term	
14	Dante Fascell	D	FL-15	January 3, 1955	14th term	
15	Henry S. Reuss	D	WI-05	January 3, 1955	14th term	Left the House in 1983.
16	Jim Wright	D	TX-12	January 3, 1955	14th term	
17	John Dingell	D	MI-16	December 13, 1955	14th term	
18	William Broomfield	R	MI-19	January 3, 1957	13th term	
19	Robert Michel	R	IL-18	January 3, 1957	13th term	
20	Silvio O. Conte	R	MA-01	January 3, 1959	12th term	
21	Ed Derwinski	R	IL-04	January 3, 1959	12th term	Left the House in 1983.
22	Robert Kastenmeier	D	WI-02	January 3, 1959	12th term	
23	Del Latta	R	OH-05	January 3, 1959	12th term	
24	Dan Rostenkowski	D	IL-08	January 3, 1959	12th term	
25	Neal Smith	D	IA-04	January 3, 1959	12th term	
26	Samuel S. Stratton	D	NY-28	January 3, 1959	12th term	
27	Joseph Patrick Addabbo	D	NY-07	January 3, 1961	11th term	
28	Fernand St. Germain	D	RI-01	January 3, 1961	11th term	
29	John M. Ashbrook	R	OH-17	January 3, 1961	11th term	Died on April 24, 1982.
30	Paul Findley	R	IL-20	January 3, 1961	11th term	Left the House in 1983.
31	Mo Udall	D	AZ-02	May 2, 1961	11th term	
32	Henry B. González	D	TX-20	November 4, 1961	11th term	
33	Benjamin S. Rosenthal	D	NY-08	February 20, 1962	11th term	
34	Jim Broyhill	R	NC-10	January 3, 1963	10th term	
35	Don Edwards	D	CA-10	January 3, 1963	10th term	
36	Don Fuqua	D	FL-02	January 3, 1963	10th term	
37	Sam Gibbons	D	FL-07	January 3, 1963	10th term	
38	Augustus F. Hawkins	D	CA-29	January 3, 1963	10th term	
39	Frank Horton	R	NY-34	January 3, 1963	10th term	
40	Clarence Long	D	MD-02	January 3, 1963	10th term	
41	Robert McClory	R	IL-13	January 3, 1963	10th term	Left the House in 1983.
42	Joseph McDade	R	PA-10	January 3, 1963	10th term	
43	Joseph Minish	D	NJ-11	January 3, 1963	10th term	
44	Claude Pepper	D	FL-14	January 3, 1963	10th term	
45	Jimmy Quillen	R	TN-01	January 3, 1963	10th term	
46	Edward R. Roybal	D	CA-25	January 3, 1963	10th term	
47	Don H. Clausen	R	CA-02	January 22, 1963	10th term	Left the House in 1983.
48	J. J. Pickle	D	TX-10	December 21, 1963	10th term	
49	Phillip Burton	D	CA-06	February 18, 1964	10th term	
50	Frank Annunzio	D	IL-11	January 3, 1965	9th term	
51	Jonathan Brewster Bingham	D	NY-22	January 3, 1965	9th term	Left the House in 1983.
52	Barber Conable	R	NY-35	January 3, 1965	9th term	
53	John Conyers	D	MI-01	January 3, 1965	9th term	
54	Bill Dickinson	R	AL-02	January 3, 1965	9th term	
55	John Duncan Sr.	R	TN-02	January 3, 1965	9th term	
56	Jack Edwards	R	AL-01	January 3, 1965	9th term	
57	John N. Erlenborn	R	IL-14	January 3, 1965	9th term	
58	Tom Foley	D	WA-05	January 3, 1965	9th term	
59	William Ford	D	MI-15	January 3, 1965	9th term	
60	Kika De la Garza	D	TX-15	January 3, 1965	9th term	
61	Lee Hamilton	D	IN-09	January 3, 1965	9th term	
62	James J. Howard	D	NJ-03	January 3, 1965	9th term	
63	J. William Stanton	R	OH-11	January 3, 1965	9th term	Left the House in 1983.
64	Richard Crawford White	D	TX-16	January 3, 1965	9th term	Left the House in 1983.
65	Sidney Yates	D	IL-09	January 3, 1965; Previous service, 1949–1963.	16th term*	
66	Clarence Brown Jr.	R	OH-07	November 2, 1965	9th term	Left the House in 1983.
67	Walter B. Jones Sr.	D	NC-01	February 5, 1966	9th term	
68	Guy Vander Jagt	R	MI-09	November 8, 1966	9th term	
69	Tom Bevill	D	AL-04	January 3, 1967	8th term	
70	Jack Thomas Brinkley	D	GA-03	January 3, 1967	8th term	Left the House in 1983.
71	John Paul Hammerschmidt	R	AR-03	January 3, 1967	8th term	
72	Margaret Heckler	R	MA-10	January 3, 1967	8th term	Left the House in 1983.
73	Abraham Kazen	D	TX-23	January 3, 1967	8th term	
74	Clarence E. Miller	R	OH-10	January 3, 1967	8th term	
75	Sonny Montgomery	D	MS-03	January 3, 1967	8th term	
76	John Myers	R	IN-07	January 3, 1967	8th term	
77	Bill Nichols	D	AL-03	January 3, 1967	8th term	
78	Tom Railsback	R	IL-19	January 3, 1967	8th term	Left the House in 1983.
79	Gene Snyder	R	KY-04	January 3, 1967; Previous service, 1963–1965.	9th term*	
80	William C. Wampler	R	VA-09	January 3, 1967; Previous service, 1953–1955.	9th term*	Left the House in 1983.
81	Larry Winn	R	KS-03	January 3, 1967	8th term	
82	Chalmers Wylie	R	OH-15	January 3, 1967	8th term	
83	Pete McCloskey	D	CA-12	December 12, 1967	8th term	Left the House in 1983.
84	James M. Collins	R	TX-03	August 24, 1968	8th term	Left the House in 1983.
85	Joseph M. Gaydos	D	PA-20	November 5, 1968	8th term	
86	Bill Alexander	D	AR-01	January 3, 1969	7th term	
87	Glenn M. Anderson	D	CA-32	January 3, 1969	7th term	
88	Mario Biaggi	D	NY-10	January 3, 1969	7th term	
89	William V. Chappell Jr.	D	FL-04	January 3, 1969	7th term	
90	Shirley Chisholm	D	NY-12	January 3, 1969	7th term	Left the House in 1983.
91	Bill Clay	D	MO-01	January 3, 1969	7th term	
92	Lawrence Coughlin	R	PA-13	January 3, 1969	7th term	
93	Dan Daniel	D	VA-05	January 3, 1969	7th term	
94	Hamilton Fish	R	NY-25	January 3, 1969	7th term	
95	Manuel Lujan Jr.	R	NM-01	January 3, 1969	7th term	
96	Bob Mollohan	D	WV-01	January 3, 1969; Previous service, 1953–1957.	9th term*	Left the House in 1983.
97	Louis Stokes	D	OH-21	January 3, 1969	7th term	
98	G. William Whitehurst	R	VA-02	January 3, 1969	7th term	
99	Gus Yatron	D	PA-06	January 3, 1969	7th term	
100	Ed Jones	D	TN-07	March 25, 1969	7th term	
101	Dave Obey	D	WI-07	April 1, 1969	7th term	
102	Barry Goldwater Jr.	R	CA-20	April 29, 1969	7th term	Left the House in 1983.
103	Robert A. Roe	D	NJ-08	November 4, 1969	7th term	
104	Phil Crane	R	IL-12	November 25, 1969	7th term	
105	John H. Rousselot	R	CA-26	June 30, 1970; Previous service, 1961–1963.	8th term*	Left the House in 1983.
106	Edwin B. Forsythe	R	NJ-06	November 3, 1970	7th term	
107	Bill Archer	R	TX-07	January 3, 1971	6th term	
108	Les Aspin	D	WI-01	January 3, 1971	6th term	
109	William R. Cotter	D	CT-01	January 3, 1971	6th term	Died on September 8, 1981.
110	George E. Danielson	D	CA-30	January 3, 1971	6th term	Resigned on March 9, 1982.
111	Ron Dellums	D	CA-08	January 3, 1971	6th term	
112	Bill Frenzel	R	MN-03	January 3, 1971	6th term	
113	Elwood Hillis	R	IN-05	January 3, 1971	6th term	
114	Jack Kemp	R	NY-38	January 3, 1971	6th term	
115	Norman F. Lent	R	NY-04	January 3, 1971	6th term	
116	Stewart McKinney	R	CT-04	January 3, 1971	6th term	
117	Romano Mazzoli	D	KY-03	January 3, 1971	6th term	
118	Parren Mitchell	D	MD-07	January 3, 1971	6th term	
119	Charles B. Rangel	D	NY-19	January 3, 1971	6th term	
120	J. Kenneth Robinson	R	VA-07	January 3, 1971	6th term	
121	John F. Seiberling	D	OH-14	January 3, 1971	6th term	
122	Floyd Spence	R	SC-02	January 3, 1971	6th term	
123	Bill Young	R	FL-06	January 3, 1971	6th term	
124	John Breaux	D	LA-07	September 30, 1972	6th term	
125	M. Caldwell Butler	R	VA-06	November 7, 1972	6th term	Left the House in 1983.
126	Ike F. Andrews	D	NC-04	January 3, 1973	5th term	
127	Louis A. Bafalis	R	FL-10	January 3, 1973	5th term	Left the House in 1983.
128	Robin Beard	R	TN-06	January 3, 1973	5th term	Left the House in 1983.
129	David R. Bowen	D	MS-02	January 3, 1973	5th term	Left the House in 1983.
130	George Brown Jr.	D	CA-36	January 3, 1973; Previous service, 1963–1971.	9th term*	
131	Clair Burgener	R	CA-43	January 3, 1973	5th term	Left the House in 1983.
132	Robert Daniel	R	VA-04	January 3, 1973	5th term	Left the House in 1983.
133	Benjamin A. Gilman	R	NY-26	January 3, 1973	5th term	
134	Ronald Ginn	D	GA-01	January 3, 1973	5th term	Left the House in 1983.
135	Tennyson Guyer	R	OH-04	January 3, 1973	5th term	Died on April 12, 1981.
136	Marjorie Holt	R	MD-04	January 3, 1973	5th term	
137	James Robert Jones	D	OK-01	January 3, 1973	5th term	
138	William Lehman	D	FL-13	January 3, 1973	5th term	
139	Gillis W. Long	D	LA-08	January 3, 1973; Previous service, 1963–1965.	6th term*	
140	Trent Lott	R	MS-05	January 3, 1973	5th term	
141	Edward Rell Madigan	R	IL-21	January 3, 1973	5th term	
142	James G. Martin	R	NC-09	January 3, 1973	5th term	
143	Donald J. Mitchell	R	NY-31	January 3, 1973	5th term	Left the House in 1983.
144	Joe Moakley	D	MA-09	January 3, 1973	5th term	
145	Carlos Moorhead	R	CA-22	January 3, 1973	5th term	
146	George M. O'Brien	R	IL-17	January 3, 1973	5th term	
147	Joel Pritchard	R	WA-01	January 3, 1973	5th term	
148	Ralph Regula	R	OH-16	January 3, 1973	5th term	
149	Matthew John Rinaldo	R	NJ-12	January 3, 1973	5th term	
150	Charlie Rose	D	NC-07	January 3, 1973	5th term	
151	Patricia Schroeder	D	CO-01	January 3, 1973	5th term	
152	Bud Shuster	R	PA-09	January 3, 1973	5th term	
153	Pete Stark	D	CA-09	January 3, 1973	5th term	
154	Gerry Studds	D	MA-12	January 3, 1973	5th term	
155	Gene Taylor	R	MO-07	January 3, 1973	5th term	
156	Charles Wilson	D	TX-02	January 3, 1973	5th term	
157	Don Young	R	AK	March 6, 1973	5th term	
158	Lindy Boggs	D	LA-02	March 20, 1973	5th term	
159	Cardiss Collins	D	IL-07	June 5, 1973	5th term	
160	John Murtha	D	PA-12	February 5, 1974	5th term	
161	Robert J. Lagomarsino	R	CA-19	March 5, 1974	5th term	
162	J. Bob Traxler	D	MI-08	April 23, 1974	5th term	
163	John L. Burton	D	CA-05	June 4, 1974	5th term	Left the House in 1983.
164	Les AuCoin	D	OR-01	January 3, 1975	4th term	
165	Berkley Bedell	D	IA-06	January 3, 1975	4th term	
166	James Blanchard	D	MI-18	January 3, 1975	4th term	Resigned on January 1, 1983.
167	Don Bonker	D	WA-03	January 3, 1975	4th term	
168	William M. Brodhead	D	MI-17	January 3, 1975	4th term	Left the House in 1983.
169	Butler Derrick	D	SC-03	January 3, 1975	4th term	
170	Thomas Downey	D	NY-02	January 3, 1975	4th term	
171	Norman D'Amours	D	NH-01	January 3, 1975	4th term	
172	Joseph D. Early	D	MA-03	January 3, 1975	4th term	
173	Robert W. Edgar	D	PA-07	January 3, 1975	4th term	
174	David F. Emery	R	ME-01	January 3, 1975	4th term	Left the House in 1983.
175	Glenn English	D	OK-06	January 3, 1975	4th term	
176	David W. Evans	D	IN-06	January 3, 1975	4th term	Left the House in 1983.
177	Millicent Fenwick	R	NJ-05	January 3, 1975	4th term	Left the House in 1983.
178	Floyd Fithian	D	IN-02	January 3, 1975	4th term	Left the House in 1983.
179	James Florio	D	NJ-01	January 3, 1975	4th term	
180	Harold Ford	D	TN-08	January 3, 1975	4th term	
181	Bill Goodling	R	PA-19	January 3, 1975	4th term	
182	Bill Gradison	R	OH-01	January 3, 1975	4th term	
183	Tom Hagedorn	R	MN-02	January 3, 1975	4th term	Left the House in 1983.
184	George V. Hansen	R	ID-02	January 3, 1975; Previous service, 1965–1969.	6th term*	
185	Tom Harkin	D	IA-05	January 3, 1975	4th term	
186	Bill Hefner	D	NC-08	January 3, 1975	4th term	
187	Jack English Hightower	D	TX-13	January 3, 1975	4th term	
188	Kenneth Lamar Holland	D	SC-05	January 3, 1975	4th term	Left the House in 1983.
189	Carroll Hubbard	D	KY-01	January 3, 1975	4th term	
190	William Hughes	D	NJ-02	January 3, 1975	4th term	
191	Henry Hyde	R	IL-06	January 3, 1975	4th term	
192	Andrew Jacobs Jr.	D	IN-11	January 3, 1975; Previous service, 1965–1973.	8th term*	
193	Jim Jeffords	R	VT	January 3, 1975	4th term	
194	Tom Kindness	R	OH-08	January 3, 1975	4th term	
195	John LaFalce	D	NY-36	January 3, 1975	4th term	
196	Elliott H. Levitas	D	GA-04	January 3, 1975	4th term	
197	Marilyn Lloyd	D	TN-03	January 3, 1975	4th term	
198	Larry McDonald	D	GA-07	January 3, 1975	4th term	
199	Matthew F. McHugh	D	NY-27	January 3, 1975	4th term	
200	George Miller	D	CA-07	January 3, 1975	4th term	
201	Norman Mineta	D	CA-13	January 3, 1975	4th term	
202	Toby Moffett	D	CT-06	January 3, 1975	4th term	Left the House in 1983.
203	Henson Moore	R	LA-06	January 3, 1975	4th term	
204	Ronald M. Mottl	D	OH-23	January 3, 1975	4th term	Left the House in 1983.
205	Stephen Neal	D	NC-05	January 3, 1975	4th term	
206	Henry J. Nowak	D	NY-37	January 3, 1975	4th term	
207	Jim Oberstar	D	MN-08	January 3, 1975	4th term	
208	Richard Ottinger	D	NY-24	January 3, 1975; Previous service, 1965–1971.	7th term*	
209	Jerry M. Patterson	D	CA-38	January 3, 1975	4th term	
210	Fred Richmond	D	NY-14	January 3, 1975	4th term	Resigned on August 25, 1982.
211	Marty Russo	D	IL-03	January 3, 1975	4th term	
212	James David Santini	D	NV	January 3, 1975	4th term	Left the House in 1983.
213	James H. Scheuer	D	NY-11	January 3, 1975; Previous service, 1965–1973.	8th term*	
214	Richard T. Schulze	R	PA-05	January 3, 1975	4th term	
215	Philip Sharp	D	IN-10	January 3, 1975	4th term	
216	Paul Simon	D	IL-24	January 3, 1975	4th term	
217	Virginia D. Smith	R	NE-03	January 3, 1975	4th term	
218	Stephen J. Solarz	D	NY-13	January 3, 1975	4th term	
219	Gladys Spellman	D	MD-05	January 3, 1975	4th term	Declared incapacitated on February 24, 1981.
220	Henry Waxman	D	CA-24	January 3, 1975	4th term	
221	Jim Weaver	D	OR-03	January 3, 1975	4th term	
222	Tim Wirth	D	CO-02	January 3, 1975	4th term	
223	Leo C. Zeferetti	D	NY-15	January 3, 1975	4th term	Left the House in 1983.
224	John G. Fary	D	IL-05	July 8, 1975	4th term	Left the House in 1983.
225	Stan Lundine	D	NY-39	March 2, 1976	4th term	
226	Sam B. Hall Jr.	D	TX-01	June 19, 1976	4th term	
227	Earl Thomas Coleman	R	MO-06	November 2, 1976	4th term	
228	Ed Markey	D	MA-07	November 2, 1976	4th term	
229	Daniel Akaka	D	HI-02	January 3, 1977	3rd term	
230	Douglas Applegate	D	OH-18	January 3, 1977	3rd term	
231	Robert Badham	R	CA-40	January 3, 1977	3rd term	
232	Doug Barnard Jr.	D	GA-10	January 3, 1977	3rd term	
233	Anthony C. Beilenson	D	CA-23	January 3, 1977	3rd term	
234	Adam Benjamin Jr.	D	IN-01	January 3, 1977	3rd term	Died on September 7, 1982.
235	David Bonior	D	MI-12	January 3, 1977	3rd term	
236	Tom Corcoran	R	IL-15	January 3, 1977	3rd term	
237	Norm Dicks	D	WA-06	January 3, 1977	3rd term	
238	Bob Dornan	R	CA-27	January 3, 1977	3rd term	Left the House in 1983.
239	Mickey Edwards	R	OK-05	January 3, 1977	3rd term	
240	Allen E. Ertel	D	PA-17	January 3, 1977	3rd term	Left the House in 1983.
241	Billy Lee Evans	D	GA-08	January 3, 1977	3rd term	Left the House in 1983.
242	Thomas B. Evans Jr.	R	DE	January 3, 1977	3rd term	Left the House in 1983.
243	Ronnie Flippo	D	AL-05	January 3, 1977	3rd term	
244	Dick Gephardt	D	MO-03	January 3, 1977	3rd term	
245	Dan Glickman	D	KS-04	January 3, 1977	3rd term	
246	Al Gore	D	TN-04	January 3, 1977	3rd term	
247	Cecil Heftel	D	HI-01	January 3, 1977	3rd term	
248	Harold C. Hollenbeck	R	NJ-09	January 3, 1977	3rd term	Left the House in 1983.
249	Jerry Huckaby	D	LA-05	January 3, 1977	3rd term	
250	Andy Ireland	D	FL-08	January 3, 1977	3rd term	
251	Ed Jenkins	D	GA-09	January 3, 1977	3rd term	
252	Dale Kildee	D	MI-07	January 3, 1977	3rd term	
253	Jim Leach	R	IA-01	January 3, 1977	3rd term	
254	Raymond F. Lederer	D	PA-03	January 3, 1977	3rd term	Resigned on April 29, 1981.
255	Tom Luken	D	OH-02	January 3, 1977; Previous service, 1974–1975.	4th term*	
256	Ron Marlenee	R	MT-02	January 3, 1977	3rd term	
257	Marc L. Marks	R	PA-24	January 3, 1977	3rd term	Left the House in 1983.
258	David D. Marriott	R	UT-02	January 3, 1977	3rd term	
259	Jim Mattox	D	TX-05	January 3, 1977	3rd term	Left the House in 1983.
260	Barbara Mikulski	D	MD-03	January 3, 1977	3rd term	
261	Austin Murphy	D	PA-22	January 3, 1977	3rd term	
262	Mary Rose Oakar	D	OH-20	January 3, 1977	3rd term	
263	Leon Panetta	D	CA-16	January 3, 1977	3rd term	
264	Donald J. Pease	D	OH-13	January 3, 1977	3rd term	
265	Carl Pursell	R	MI-02	January 3, 1977	3rd term	
266	Nick Rahall	D	WV-04	January 3, 1977	3rd term	
267	Eldon Rudd	R	AZ-04	January 3, 1977	3rd term	
268	Harold S. Sawyer	R	MI-05	January 3, 1977	3rd term	
269	Ike Skelton	D	MO-04	January 3, 1977	3rd term	
270	David Stockman	R	MI-04	January 3, 1977	3rd term	Resigned on January 21, 1981.
271	Bob Stump	D	AZ-03	January 3, 1977	3rd term	
272	Paul S. Trible Jr.	R	VA-01	January 3, 1977	3rd term	Left the House in 1983.
273	Bruce Vento	D	MN-04	January 3, 1977	3rd term	
274	Harold Volkmer	D	MO-09	January 3, 1977	3rd term	
275	Doug Walgren	D	PA-18	January 3, 1977	3rd term	
276	Robert Walker	R	PA-16	January 3, 1977	3rd term	
277	Wes Watkins	D	OK-03	January 3, 1977	3rd term	
278	Theodore S. Weiss	D	NY-20	January 3, 1977	3rd term	
279	Charles Whitley	D	NC-03	January 3, 1977	3rd term	
280	Robert A. Young	D	MO-02	January 3, 1977	3rd term	
281	Arlan Stangeland	R	MN-07	February 22, 1977	3rd term	
282	Wyche Fowler	D	GA-05	April 6, 1977	3rd term	
283	Bob Livingston	R	LA-01	August 27, 1977	3rd term	
284	S. William Green	R	NY-18	February 14, 1978	3rd term	
285	Robert Garcia	D	NY-21	February 21, 1978	3rd term	
286	Donald J. Albosta	D	MI-10	January 3, 1979	2nd term	
287	Beryl Anthony Jr.	D	AR-04	January 3, 1979	2nd term	
288	Eugene Atkinson	D	PA-25	January 3, 1979	2nd term	Left the House in 1983.
289	Donald A. Bailey	D	PA-21	January 3, 1979	2nd term	Left the House in 1983.
290	Michael D. Barnes	D	MD-08	January 3, 1979	2nd term	
291	Doug Bereuter	R	NE-01	January 3, 1979	2nd term	
292	Ed Bethune	R	AR-02	January 3, 1979	2nd term	
293	Bill Boner	D	TN-05	January 3, 1979	2nd term	
294	Beverly Byron	D	MD-06	January 3, 1979	2nd term	
295	Carroll A. Campbell Jr.	R	SC-04	January 3, 1979	2nd term	
296	William Carney	R	NY-01	January 3, 1979	2nd term	
297	Dick Cheney	R	WY	January 3, 1979	2nd term	
298	Bill Clinger	R	PA-23	January 3, 1979	2nd term	
299	Tony Coelho	D	CA-15	January 3, 1979	2nd term	
300	Jim Courter	R	NJ-13	January 3, 1979	2nd term	
301	Dan Crane	R	IL-22	January 3, 1979	2nd term	
302	William E. Dannemeyer	R	CA-39	January 3, 1979	2nd term	
303	Thomas Daschle	D	SD-01	January 3, 1979	2nd term	
304	Robert William Davis	R	MI-11	January 3, 1979	2nd term	
305	H. Joel Deckard	R	IN-08	January 3, 1979	2nd term	Left the House in 1983.
306	Julian C. Dixon	D	CA-28	January 3, 1979	2nd term	
307	Brian J. Donnelly	D	MA-11	January 3, 1979	2nd term	
308	Charles F. Dougherty	R	PA-04	January 3, 1979	2nd term	Left the House in 1983.
309	Arlen Erdahl	R	MN-01	January 3, 1979	2nd term	Left the House in 1983.
310	Vic Fazio	D	CA-04	January 3, 1979	2nd term	
311	Geraldine Ferraro	D	NY-09	January 3, 1979	2nd term	
312	Martin Frost	D	TX-24	January 3, 1979	2nd term	
313	Newt Gingrich	R	GA-06	January 3, 1979	2nd term	
314	Phil Gramm	D	TX-06	January 3, 1979	2nd term	
315	William H. Gray	D	PA-02	January 3, 1979	2nd term	
316	Wayne R. Grisham	R	CA-33	January 3, 1979	2nd term	Left the House in 1983.
317	Frank Joseph Guarini	D	NJ-14	January 3, 1979	2nd term	
318	Tony Hall	D	OH-03	January 3, 1979	2nd term	
319	Kent Hance	D	TX-19	January 3, 1979	2nd term	
320	Jon Hinson	R	MS-04	January 3, 1979	2nd term	Resigned on April 13, 1981.
321	Larry J. Hopkins	R	KY-06	January 3, 1979	2nd term	
322	Earl Dewitt Hutto	D	FL-01	January 3, 1979	2nd term	
323	James Edmund Jeffries	R	KS-02	January 3, 1979	2nd term	Left the House in 1983.
324	Ken Kramer	R	CO-05	January 3, 1979	2nd term	
325	Raymond P. Kogovsek	D	CO-03	January 3, 1979	2nd term	
326	Marvin Leath	D	TX-11	January 3, 1979	2nd term	
327	Mickey Leland	D	TX-18	January 3, 1979	2nd term	
328	Gary A. Lee	R	NY-33	January 3, 1979	2nd term	Left the House in 1983.
329	Jerry Lewis	R	CA-37	January 3, 1979	2nd term	
330	Tom Loeffler	R	TX-21	January 3, 1979	2nd term	
331	Mike Lowry	D	WA-07	January 3, 1979	2nd term	
332	Dan Lungren	R	CA-34	January 3, 1979	2nd term	
333	Bob Matsui	D	CA-03	January 3, 1979	2nd term	
334	Nicholas Mavroules	D	MA-06	January 3, 1979	2nd term	
335	Dan Mica	D	FL-11	January 3, 1979	2nd term	
336	Bill Nelson	D	FL-09	January 3, 1979	2nd term	
337	Chip Pashayan	R	CA-17	January 3, 1979	2nd term	
338	Peter A. Peyser	D	NY-23	January 3, 1979; Previous service, 1971–1977.	5th term*	Left the House in 1983.
339	Ron Paul	R	TX-22	January 3, 1979; Previous service, 1976–1977.	3rd term*	
340	William R. Ratchford	D	CT-05	January 3, 1979	2nd term	
341	Donald L. Ritter	R	PA-15	January 3, 1979	2nd term	
342	Toby Roth	R	WI-08	January 3, 1979	2nd term	
343	Martin Olav Sabo	D	MN-05	January 3, 1979	2nd term	
344	James Sensenbrenner	R	WI-09	January 3, 1979	2nd term	
345	James Shannon	D	MA-05	January 3, 1979	2nd term	
346	Richard Shelby	D	AL-07	January 3, 1979	2nd term	
347	Norman D. Shumway	R	CA-14	January 3, 1979	2nd term	
348	Olympia Snowe	R	ME-02	January 3, 1979	2nd term	
349	Charles Stenholm	D	TX-17	January 3, 1979	2nd term	
350	Gerald Solomon	R	NY-29	January 3, 1979	2nd term	
351	Al Swift	D	WA-02	January 3, 1979	2nd term	
352	Mike Synar	D	OK-02	January 3, 1979	2nd term	
353	Tom Tauke	R	IA-02	January 3, 1979	2nd term	
354	Bill Thomas	R	CA-18	January 3, 1979	2nd term	
355	Bob Whittaker	R	KS-05	January 3, 1979	2nd term	
356	Pat Williams	D	MT-01	January 3, 1979	2nd term	
357	Lyle Williams	R	OH-19	January 3, 1979	2nd term	
358	Howard Wolpe	D	MI-03	January 3, 1979	2nd term	
359	Tom Petri	R	WI-06	April 3, 1979	2nd term	
360	John Porter	R	IL-10	January 22, 1980	2nd term	
361	Billy Tauzin	D	LA-03	May 22, 1980	2nd term	
362	George W. Crockett Jr.	D	MI-13	November 4, 1980	2nd term	
363	Wendell Bailey	R	MO-08	January 3, 1981	1st term	Left the House in 1983.
364	Cleve Benedict	R	WV-02	January 3, 1981	1st term	Left the House in 1983.
365	Thomas Bliley	R	VA-03	January 3, 1981	1st term	
366	Hank Brown	R	CO-04	January 3, 1981	1st term	
367	Gregory W. Carman	R	NY-03	January 3, 1981	1st term	Left the House in 1983.
368	Eugene A. Chappie	R	CA-01	January 3, 1981	1st term	
369	Dan Coats	R	IN-04	January 3, 1981	1st term	
370	James K. Coyne III	R	PA-08	January 3, 1981	1st term	Left the House in 1983.
371	William Coyne	D	PA-14	January 3, 1981	1st term	
372	Larry Craig	R	ID-01	January 3, 1981	1st term	
373	Hal Daub	R	NE-02	January 3, 1981	1st term	
374	Lawrence J. DeNardis	R	CT-03	January 3, 1981	1st term	Left the House in 1983.
375	Byron Dorgan	D	ND	January 3, 1981	1st term	
376	David Dreier	R	CA-35	January 3, 1981	1st term	
377	James Whitney Dunn	R	MI-06	January 3, 1981	1st term	Left the House in 1983.
378	Bernard J. Dwyer	D	NJ-15	January 3, 1981	1st term	
379	Mervyn M. Dymally	D	CA-31	January 3, 1981	1st term	
380	Roy Dyson	D	MD-01	January 3, 1981	1st term	
381	Dennis E. Eckart	D	OH-22	January 3, 1981	1st term	
382	Bill Emerson	R	MO-10	January 3, 1981	1st term	
383	T. Cooper Evans	R	IA-03	January 3, 1981	1st term	
384	Bobbi Fiedler	R	CA-21	January 3, 1981	1st term	
385	Jack Fields	R	TX-08	January 3, 1981	1st term	
386	Tom Foglietta	D	PA-01	January 3, 1981	1st term	
387	Barney Frank	D	MA-04	January 3, 1981	1st term	
388	Sam Gejdenson	D	CT-02	January 3, 1981	1st term	
389	Judd Gregg	R	NH-02	January 3, 1981	1st term	
390	Steve Gunderson	R	WI-03	January 3, 1981	1st term	
391	Ralph Hall	D	TX-04	January 3, 1981	1st term	
392	James Hansen	R	UT-01	January 3, 1981	1st term	
393	Charles Floyd Hatcher	D	GA-02	January 3, 1981	1st term	
394	Thomas F. Hartnett	R	SC-01	January 3, 1981	1st term	
395	Bill Hendon	R	NC-11	January 3, 1981	1st term	Left the House in 1983.
396	Dennis M. Hertel	D	MI-14	January 3, 1981	1st term	
397	John P. Hiler	R	IN-03	January 3, 1981	1st term	
398	Duncan Hunter	R	CA-42	January 3, 1981	1st term	
399	Tom Lantos	D	CA-11	January 3, 1981	1st term	
400	John LeBoutillier	R	NY-06	January 3, 1981	1st term	Left the House in 1983.
401	Bill Lowery	R	CA-41	January 3, 1981	1st term	
402	Walter E. Johnston, III	R	NC-06	January 3, 1981	1st term	Left the House in 1983.
403	David O'Brien Martin	R	NY-30	January 3, 1981	1st term	
404	Lynn Morley Martin	R	IL-16	January 3, 1981	1st term	
405	Bill McCollum	R	FL-05	January 3, 1981	1st term	
406	Dave McCurdy	D	OK-04	January 3, 1981	1st term	
407	Bob McEwen	R	OH-06	January 3, 1981	1st term	
408	Raymond J. McGrath	R	NY-05	January 3, 1981	1st term	
409	Guy Molinari	R	NY-17	January 3, 1981	1st term	
410	Sid Morrison	R	WA-04	January 3, 1981	1st term	
411	John Light Napier	R	SC-06	January 3, 1981	1st term	Left the House in 1983.
412	James L. Nelligan	R	PA-11	January 3, 1981	1st term	Left the House in 1983.
413	Stanford Parris	R	VA-08	January 3, 1981; Previous service, 1973–1975.	2nd term*	
414	Clint Roberts	R	SD-02	January 3, 1981	1st term	Left the House in 1983.
415	Pat Roberts	R	KS-01	January 3, 1981	1st term	
416	Buddy Roemer	D	LA-04	January 3, 1981	1st term	
417	Hal Rogers	R	KY-05	January 3, 1981	1st term	
418	Marge Roukema	R	NJ-07	January 3, 1981	1st term	
419	William Neff Patman	D	TX-14	January 3, 1981	1st term	
420	Gus Savage	D	IL-02	January 3, 1981	1st term	
421	Claudine Schneider	R	RI-02	January 3, 1981	1st term	
422	Chuck Schumer	D	NY-16	January 3, 1981	1st term	
423	Bob Shamansky	D	OH-12	January 3, 1981	1st term	Left the House in 1983.
424	E. Clay Shaw Jr.	R	FL-12	January 3, 1981	1st term	
425	Joe Skeen	R	NM-02	January 3, 1981	1st term	
426	Albert L. Smith Jr.	R	AL-06	January 3, 1981	1st term	Left the House in 1983.
427	Christopher Smith	R	NJ-04	January 3, 1981	1st term	
428	Denny Smith	R	OR-04	January 3, 1981	1st term	
429	Mick Staton	R	WV-03	January 3, 1981	1st term	Left the House in 1983.
430	Harold Washington	D	IL-01	January 3, 1981	1st term	
431	Ed Weber	R	OH-09	January 3, 1981	1st term	Left the House in 1983.
432	Vin Weber	R	MN-06	January 3, 1981	1st term	
433	Frank Wolf	R	VA-10	January 3, 1981	1st term	
434	George C. Wortley	R	NY-32	January 3, 1981	1st term	
435	Ron Wyden	D	OR-02	January 3, 1981	1st term	
	Mark D. Siljander	R	MI-04	April 21, 1981	1st term	
	Steny H. Hoyer	D	MD-05	May 19, 1981	1st term	
	Mike Oxley	R	OH-04	June 25, 1981	1st term	
	Wayne Dowdy	D	MS-04	July 7, 1981	1st term	
	Joseph F. Smith	D	PA-03	July 21, 1981	1st term	Left the House in 1983.
	Barbara B. Kennelly	D	CT-01	January 12, 1982	1st term	
	Jean Spencer Ashbrook	R	OH-17	June 29, 1982	1st term	Left the House in 1983.
	Matthew G. Martínez	D	CA-30	July 13, 1982	1st term	
	Katie Hall	D	IN-01	November 2, 1982	1st term	

== Delegates ==
Rank	Delegate	Party	District	Seniority date (Previous service, if any)	No.# of term(s)	Notes
1	Walter E. Fauntroy	D	DC	March 23, 1971	6th term	
2	Antonio Borja Won Pat	D	GU	January 3, 1973	5th term	
3	Baltasar Corrada del Río	D	PR	January 3, 1977	3rd term	
4	Ron de Lugo	D	VI	January 3, 1981; Previous service, 1973–1979.	4th term*	
5	Fofó Iosefa Fiti Sunia	D	AS	January 3, 1981	1st term	

== See also ==
- 97th United States Congress
- List of United States congressional districts
- List of United States senators in the 97th Congress
