= 1988 United States Senate election in Mississippi =

- November 8, 1988
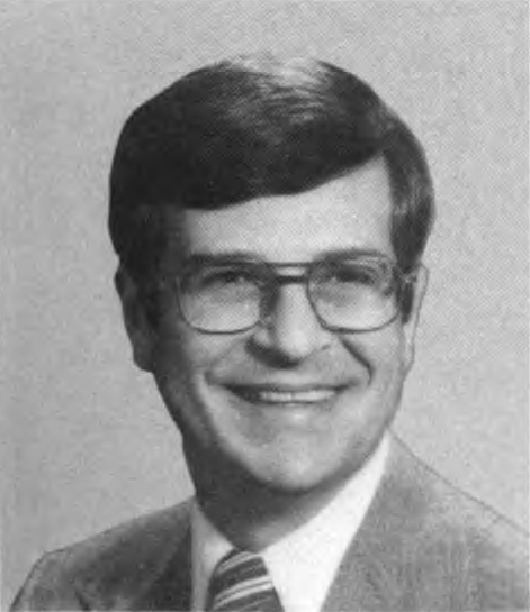

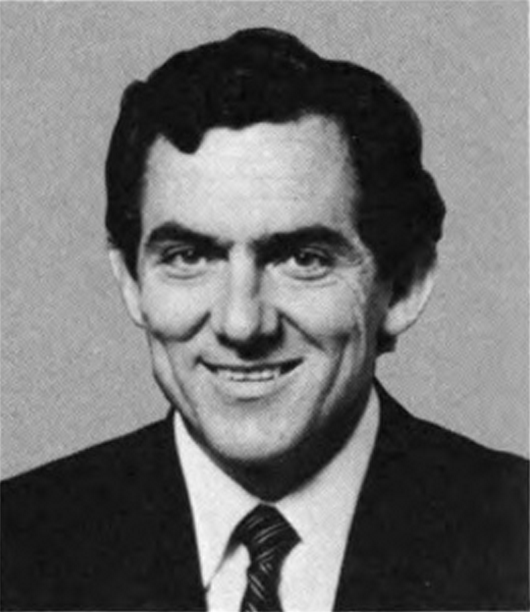
Nominee	Trent Lott	Wayne Dowdy
Party	Republican	Democratic
Popular vote	510,380	436,339
Percentage	53.91%	46.09%
- County results Lott: 50–60% 60–70% 70–80% Dowdy: 50–60% 60–70% 70–80% 80–90%
U.S. senator before election
John C. Stennis
Democratic
Elected U.S. Senator
Trent Lott
Republican

The 1988 United States Senate election in Mississippi was held on November 8, 1988. Incumbent Democratic U.S. Senator John C. Stennis decided to retire instead of seeking a seventh full term. Republican Trent Lott won the open seat, becoming the first of his party to win this seat since 1874.

This was the first time since the end of Reconstruction in 1877 that Mississippi had two Republican senators serving concurrently.

== Democratic primary ==
=== Candidates ===
- Wayne Dowdy, U.S. Representative from McComb since 1981
- Dick Molpus, Secretary of State of Mississippi
- Gilbert Fountain, Biloxi pipefitter

Dean Pittman managed Dowdy's campaign.

During the campaign Molpus criticized Dowdy for his low voting attendance of 68 percent, a line of rhetoric which was later used by Republican nominee Trent Lott in the general election.

=== Results ===
Results by county Dowdy: 40–50%; 50–60%; 60–70%; 70–80%; Molpus: 40–50%; 50–60%; 60–70%; 70–80%

Democratic primary results
Party	Candidate	Votes	%
Democratic	Wayne Dowdy	189,954	53.46%
Democratic	Dick Molpus	152,126	42.81%
Democratic	Gilbert Fountain	13,276	3.74%
Total votes		355,356	100%

== Republican primary ==
=== Candidates ===
- Trent Lott, U.S. Representative from Pascagoula since 1973, House Minority Whip since 1981

== General ==
During Lott's tenure in the U.S. House of Representatives he opposed the Comprehensive Anti-Apartheid Act, Civil Rights Restoration Act of 1987, and the creation of Martin Luther King Jr. Day while Dowdy supported those bills. Robert Goodman, who Bill Minor named Dr. Feelgood for being able to portray candidates positively, was hired by Lott's campaign to create advertisements in anticipation to attacks on his voting record by Dowdy. Lott voted in favor of cutting Social Security spending while Dowdy voted against, but Lott argued that he was more likely to support Social Security as his mother lived off of it while Dowdy's family was worth $60 million.

Blacks for Trent Lott was formed by Isadora Hyde and Cleve McDowell, a former field director for the NAACP in the Delta region, worked for Lott's campaign. Dowdy's campaign criticized Lott for only having hired two black people out of the 163 people he had hired since 1972. Lott claimed that he hired many black workers, but "I don't keep count" and later claimed he hired five or six black workers.

Country musician Mel Tillis made radio ads for him targeted at rural areas in northern Mississippi. Dowdy received 87% of the black vote.

=== Polling ===
Poll source	Date(s) administered	Sample size	Margin of error	Trent Lott Republican	Wayne Dowdy Democratic	Other / Undecided
The Clarion-Ledger/WLOX	October 31 – November 2, 1988	817 LV	±3.5%	48%	34%	18%

=== Endorsements ===
List of Trent Lott endorsements

Municipal officials

- Charles Evers, mayor of Fayette, Mississippi (1969–1981; 1985–1989)

Newspapers

- The Commercial Appeal
List of Wayne Dowdy endorsements

Newspapers

- The Clarion-Ledger

== Results ==
General election results
Party	Candidate	Votes	%
Republican	Trent Lott	510,380	53.91%
Democratic	Wayne Dowdy	436,339	46.09%
Total votes		946,719	100.0%
Republican gain from Democratic			

== See also ==
- 1988 United States Senate elections

== Works cited ==
- Black, Earl; Black, Merle (1992). The Vital South: How Presidents Are Elected. Harvard University Press. ISBN 0674941306.
- Moreland, Laurence; Steed, Robert; Baker, Tod, eds. (1991). The 1988 Presidential Election in the South: Continuity Amidst Change in Southern Party Politics. Praeger Publishers. ISBN 0275931455.
