= List of United States senators in the 97th Congress =

This is a complete list of United States senators during the 97th United States Congress listed by seniority from January 3, 1981, to January 3, 1983.

Order of service is based on the commencement of the senator's first term. Behind this is former service as a senator (only giving the senator seniority within their new incoming class), service as vice president, a House member, a cabinet secretary, or a governor of a state. The final factor is the population of the senator's state.

In this congress, Robert Byrd (D-West Virginia) was the most senior junior senator and Gordon J. Humphrey (R-New Hampshire) was the most junior senior senator.

Senators who were sworn in during the middle of the two-year congressional term (up until the last senator who was not sworn in early after winning the November 1982 election) are listed at the end of the list with no number.

== Terms of service ==
Class	Terms of service of senators that expired in years
Class 1	Terms of service of senators that expired in 1983 (AZ, CA, CT, DE, FL, HI, IN, MA, MD, ME, MI, MN, MO, MS, MT, ND, NE, NJ, NM, NV, NY, OH, PA, RI, TN, TX, UT, VA, VT, WA, WI, WV, and WY.)
Class 2	Terms of service of senators that expired in 1985 (AK, AL, AR, CO, DE, GA, IA, ID, IL, KS, KY, LA, MA, ME, MI, MN, MS, MT, NC, NE, NH, NJ, NM, OK, OR, RI, SC, SD, TN, TX, VA, WV, and WY.)
Class 3	Terms of service of senators that expired in 1987 (AK, AL, AR, AZ, CA, CO, CT, DE, FL, GA, HI, IA, ID, IL, IN, KS, KY, LA, MA, ME, MI, MN, MS, NC, ND, NH, NM, NV, NY, OK, OR, SC, SD, TN, TX, VA, WA, WV, and WY.)

== U.S. Senate seniority list ==
U.S. Senate seniority
Rank	Senator (party-state)	Seniority date	Other factors
1	John C. Stennis (D-MS)	November 17, 1947	
2	Russell B. Long (D-LA)	December 31, 1948	
3	Henry M. Jackson (D-WA)	January 3, 1953	
4	Strom Thurmond (R-SC)	November 7, 1956	
5	William Proxmire (D-WI)	August 28, 1957	
6	Jennings Randolph (D-WV)	November 5, 1958	
7	Robert Byrd (D-WV)	January 3, 1959	Former representative (6 years)
8	Harrison A. Williams (D-NJ)	January 3, 1959	Former representative (4 years)
9	Howard Cannon (D-NV)	January 3, 1959	
10	Quentin Northrup Burdick (D-ND)	August 8, 1960	
11	Claiborne Pell (D-RI)	January 3, 1961	
12	John Tower (R-TX)	June 15, 1961	
13	Ted Kennedy (D-MA)	November 7, 1962	
14	Daniel Inouye (D-HI)	January 3, 1963	
15	Harry F. Byrd, Jr. (I-VA)	November 12, 1965	
16	Ernest Hollings (D-SC)	November 9, 1966	
17	Charles H. Percy (R-IL)	January 3, 1967	Illinois 4th in population (1960)
18	Howard Baker (R-TN)	January 3, 1967	Tennessee 17th in population (1960)
19	Mark Hatfield (R-OR)	January 10, 1967	
20	Ted Stevens (R-AK)	December 24, 1968	
21	Thomas Eagleton (D-MO)	December 28, 1968	
22	Barry Goldwater (R-AZ)	January 3, 1969	Previously a senator
23	Charles Mathias (R-MD)	January 3, 1969	Former representative (8 years) - Maryland 21st in population (1960)
24	Bob Dole (R-KS)	January 3, 1969	Former representative (8 years) - Kansas 29th in population (1960)
25	Alan Cranston (D-CA)	January 3, 1969	California 2nd in population (1960)
26	Bob Packwood (R-OR)	January 3, 1969	Oregon 32nd in population (1960)
27	Bill Roth (R-DE)	January 1, 1971	
28	Lloyd Bentsen (D-TX)	January 3, 1971	Former representative (6 years)
29	Lowell Weicker (R-CT)	January 3, 1971	Former representative (2 years)
30	Lawton Chiles (D-FL)	January 3, 1971	
31	Robert Stafford (R-VT)	September 16, 1971	
32	Sam Nunn (D-GA)	November 8, 1972	
33	Bennett Johnston Jr. (D-LA)	November 14, 1972	
34	James A. McClure (R-ID)	January 3, 1973	Former representative
35	Jesse Helms (R-NC)	January 3, 1973	North Carolina 12th in population (1970)
36	Walter Huddleston (D-KY)	January 3, 1973	Kentucky 23rd in population (1970)
37	Pete Domenici (R-NM)	January 3, 1973	New Mexico 37th in population (1970)
38	Joe Biden (D-DE)	January 3, 1973	Delaware 46th in population (1970)
39	Paul Laxalt (R-NV)	December 18, 1974	
40	Jake Garn (R-UT)	December 21, 1974	
41	John Glenn (D-OH)	December 24, 1974	
42	Wendell H. Ford (D-KY)	December 28, 1974	
43	Dale Bumpers (D-AR)	January 3, 1975	Former governor
44	Gary Hart (D-CO)	January 3, 1975	Colorado 30th in population (1970)
45	Patrick Leahy (D-VT)	January 3, 1975	Vermont 48th in population (1970)
46	John Danforth (R-MO)	December 27, 1976	
47	Edward Zorinsky (D-NE)	December 28, 1976	
48	Howard Metzenbaum (D-OH)	December 29, 1976	Previously a senator
49	John Chafee (R-RI)	December 29, 1976	
50	Donald W. Riegle, Jr. (D-MI)	December 30, 1976	
51	Samuel Hayakawa (R-CA)	January 2, 1977	
52	Spark Matsunaga (D-HI)	January 3, 1977	Former representative (14 years)
53	John Melcher (D-MT)	January 3, 1977	Former representative (7 years, 7 months)
54	H. John Heinz III (R-PA)	January 3, 1977	Former representative (6 years)
55	Paul Sarbanes (D-MD)	January 3, 1977	Former representative (6 years)
56	Pat Moynihan (D-NY)	January 3, 1977	New York 2nd in population (1970)
57	Richard Lugar (R-IN)	January 3, 1977	Indiana 11th in population (1970)
58	Jim Sasser (D-TN)	January 3, 1977	Tennessee 17th in population (1970)
59	Dennis DeConcini (D-AZ)	January 3, 1977	Arizona 33rd in population (1970)
60	Orrin Hatch (R-UT)	January 3, 1977	Utah 36th in population (1970)
61	Harrison Schmitt (R-NM)	January 3, 1977	New Mexico 37th in population (1970)
62	Malcolm Wallop (R-WY)	January 3, 1977	Wyoming 49th in population (1970)
63	David Durenberger (R-MN)	November 8, 1978	
64	Max Baucus (D-MT)	December 15, 1978	
65	Nancy Kassebaum Baker (R-KS)	December 23, 1978	
66	Thad Cochran (R-MS)	December 27, 1978	
67	Rudy Boschwitz (R-MN)	December 30, 1978	
68	Alan K. Simpson (R-WY)	January 1, 1979	
69	John Warner (R-VA)	January 2, 1979	
70	David Pryor (D-AR)	January 3, 1979	Former representative (6 years, 2 months)
71	William Cohen (R-ME)	January 3, 1979	Former representative (6 years)
72	Paul Tsongas (D-MA)	January 3, 1979	Former representative (4 years) - Massachusetts 10th in population (1970)
73	William L. Armstrong (R-CO)	January 3, 1979	Former representative (4 years) - Colorado 30th in population (1970)
74	Larry Pressler (R-SD)	January 3, 1979	Former representative (4 years) - South Dakota 44th in population (1970)
75	David L. Boren (D-OK)	January 3, 1979	Former governor - Oklahoma 27th in population (1970)
76	J. James Exon (D-NE)	January 3, 1979	Former governor - Nebraska 35th in population (1970)
77	Carl Levin (D-MI)	January 3, 1979	Michigan 7th in population (1970)
78	Bill Bradley (D-NJ)	January 3, 1979	New Jersey 8th in population (1970)
79	Howell Heflin (D-AL)	January 3, 1979	Alabama 21st in population (1970)
80	Roger Jepsen (R-IA)	January 3, 1979	Iowa 25th in population (1970)
81	Gordon J. Humphrey (R-NH)	January 3, 1979	New Hampshire 41st in population (1970)
82	George J. Mitchell (D-ME)	May 17, 1980	
83	Warren Rudman (R-NH)	December 31, 1980	
84	Paula Hawkins (R-FL)	January 1, 1981	
85	Jeremiah Denton (R-AL)	January 2, 1981	
86	Mark Andrews (R-ND)	January 3, 1981	Former representative (16 years)
87	Steve Symms (R-ID)	January 3, 1981	Former representative (12 years)
88	James Abdnor (R-SD)	January 3, 1981	Former representative (8 years)
89	Chris Dodd (D-CT)	January 3, 1981	Former representative (6 years) - Connecticut 24th in population (1970)
90	Chuck Grassley (R-IA)	January 3, 1981	Former representative (6 years) - Iowa 25th in population (1970)
91	Dan Quayle (R-IN)	January 3, 1981	Former representative (4 years) - Indiana 11th in population (1970)
92	Bob Kasten (R-WI)	January 3, 1981	Former representative (4 years) - Wisconsin 16th in population (1970)
93	Al D'Amato (R-NY)	January 3, 1981	New York 2nd in population (1970)
94	Arlen Specter (R-PA)	January 3, 1981	Pennsylvania 3rd in population (1970)
95	Alan J. Dixon (D-IL)	January 3, 1981	Illinois 5th in population (1970)
96	John Porter East (R-NC)	January 3, 1981	North Carolina 12th in population (1970)
97	Mack Mattingly (R-GA)	January 3, 1981	Georgia 15th in population (1970)
98	Slade Gorton (R-WA)	January 3, 1981	Washington 22nd in population (1970)
99	Don Nickles (R-OK)	January 3, 1981	Oklahoma 27th in population (1970)
100	Frank Murkowski (R-AK)	January 3, 1981	Alaska 50th in population (1970)
	Nicholas F. Brady (R-NJ)	April 20, 1982	
	Frank Lautenberg (D-NJ)	December 27, 1982	

The most senior senators by class were John C. Stennis (D-Mississippi) from Class 1, Strom Thurmond (R-South Carolina) from Class 2, and Russell B. Long (D-Louisiana) from Class 3.

== See also ==
- 97th United States Congress
- List of United States representatives in the 97th Congress
