= Bill Minor =

American journalist (1922–2017)

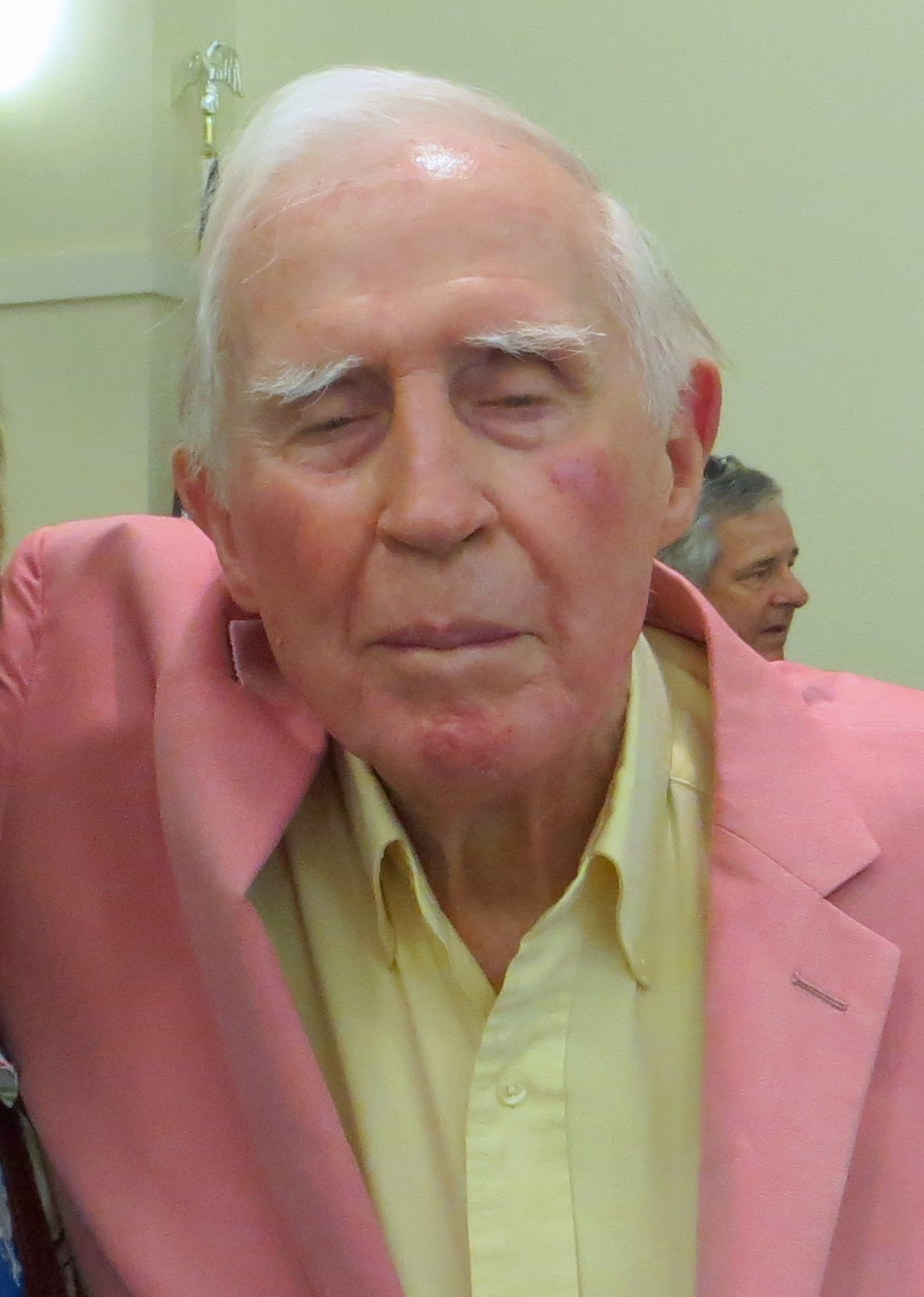
Minor in 2014

Wilson Floyd Minor (May 17, 1922 – March 28, 2017) was an American journalist and columnist who covered events in Mississippi.

== Early life ==
Wilson Floyd Minor was born on May 17, 1922, in Hammond, Louisiana, to Jacob Minor and Josie Clement Minor. His father worked as a newspaper typesetter but struggled to maintain a quality standard of living during the Great Depression, leading him to urge his son to choose a different line of work. After an English teacher at Bogalusa High School complemented Bill's writing, he got a summer job at The Bogalusa Enterprise. He moved to covering high school sports for The Times-Picayune and studied journalism at Tulane University, graduating in 1943. Minor served in the U.S. Navy during World War II as a gunnery officer aboard a destroyer, the USS Stephen Potter.

== Career ==
After the war, Minor began working at The Times-Picayune. In 1946 he was made the head of the paper's news bureau in Jackson, Mississippi. His first major assignment there was covering the funeral of U.S. Senator Theodore G. Bilbo. He went on to report on numerous events during the civil rights movement, including the 1948 Dixiecrat movement, the 1955 trial of the murderers of Emmett Till, the 1962 integration of the University of Mississippi, the 1963 murder of Medgar Evers, and the 1964 Mississippi Burning murders. During his tenure at The Times-Picayune he also worked as a stringer for The Washington Post, The New York Times, and Newsweek and advised other traveling journalists on regional sources and information. During the 1960s, Robert G. Clark Jr. became the first black man elected to serve in the Mississippi House of Representatives since Reconstruction. Minor befriended Clark and advised him on the workings of the legislature. One night, after being shunned in a debate on a bill in the House, Clark cleared out his desk and prepared to quit his seat in exasperation. Minor and Representative Butch Lambert stopped him and convinced him to stay. Mississippi Governor John Bell Williams disapproved of Minor and banned him from attending press conferences.

In 1973 Minor purchased a Jackson weekly paper for $5,000 and renamed it the Capital Reporter. He left The Times-Picayune after it closed its news bureau in Jackson in 1976 and focused his attention on the Capital Reporter. Under his ownership, the paper published investigative journalism, and on several occasions he reported seeing bullet holes in the windows of its offices and, after one story on a potential link between a district attorney and organized crime, the windows were smashed and the typesetting machine was stolen. After printing a story on the Ku Klux Klan, a cross was burned outside the offices. The paper struggled to garner advertising and eventually folded in 1981, partly due to the fact that it lost advertising from a bank after it reported that police had found drugs in the bank president's home.

Minor wrote a syndicated column for over 30 years titled "Eyes on Mississippi", which was printed in The Clarion-Ledger and other state newspapers. After suffering a stroke in 1994, he was reduced to typing with two fingers. He published a book, "Eyes on Mississippi: A Fifty-Year Chronicle of Change", in 2001. His last entry in his column was published on November 24, 2016.

== Later life ==
Several months before his death, Minor underwent heart surgery. Afterwards he contracted pneumonia and his health declined. He succumbed to congestive heart failure and died on March 28, 2017, at a hospice facility in Ridgeland, Mississippi.

== Works cited ==
- Campbell, Will D. (2003). Robert G. Clark's Journey to the House: A Black Politician's Story. Jackson: University Press of Mississippi. ISBN 978-1-57806-526-4.
