= Jon Hinson =

American politician (1942–1995)

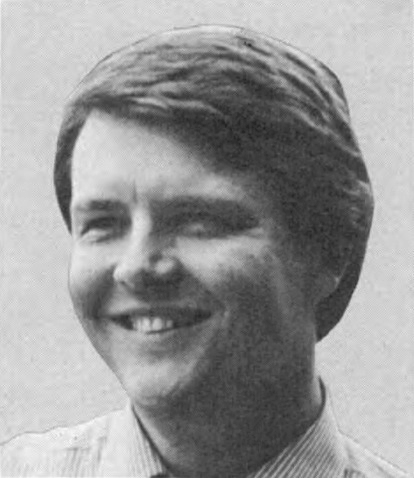
- Hinson in 1979

Member of the U.S. House of Representatives from Mississippi's 4th district
- In office January 3, 1979 – April 13, 1981
- Preceded by: Thad Cochran
- Succeeded by: Wayne Dowdy

Personal details
- Born: Jon Clifton Hinson; March 16, 1942 Tylertown, Mississippi, U.S.
- Died: July 21, 1995 (aged 53) Silver Spring, Maryland, U.S.
- Party: Republican
- Spouse: Cynthia Lee Johnson (m. 1979; div. 1989)
- Education: University of Mississippi (BA)

Military service
- Branch/service: United States Marine Corps; Marine Corps Reserve
- Years of service: 1964‍–‍1970

Jon Clifton Hinson (March 16, 1942 – July 21, 1995) was an American politician who served as a Republican U.S. representative for Mississippi's 4th congressional district from 1979 to 1981. Following his 1981 resignation after his arrest for engaging in a homosexual act, he became a gay rights activist in metropolitan Washington, D.C.

== Early life ==
Hinson was born in Tylertown, Mississippi, in 1942. He was the son of Clifton Ford Hinson and Lyndell Newman. In 1959, he worked as a page for Democratic U. S. representative John Bell Williams, who subsequently became governor of Mississippi in 1968.

Hinson graduated from the University of Mississippi in 1964 and joined the United States Marine Corps Reserve, in which he served until 1970.

== Career ==
Hinson worked on the U.S. House staff as a doorman in 1967, and then served on the staffs of Representatives Charles H. Griffin, a Democrat, and Thad Cochran, a Republican. In 1978, Cochran ran successfully for the United States Senate, and Hinson was elected to succeed Cochran in the House. With 51.6 percent of the vote, Hinson defeated the Democrat John H. Stennis, the son of U.S. senator John C. Stennis, who finished with 26.4 percent of the vote. The remaining ballots were cast for independent candidates.

== Sexual orientation ==
Prior to his 1978 candidacy for the U.S. House, Hinson survived a fire on October 24, 1977, at the Gay Cinema Follies in Washington, D.C. Firefighters found him under a pile of bodies; he was one of only four men rescued.

On August 11, 1979, Hinson married Cynthia Lee Johnson in Alexandria, Virginia. The couple separated on November 22, 1987. Their marriage was dissolved by divorce on March 29, 1989.

In 1980, Hinson admitted that in 1976, while an aide to Cochran, he had been arrested for committing an obscene act after he exposed himself to an undercover policeman at the Iwo Jima Memorial near Arlington National Cemetery. Hinson then denied that he was homosexual and blamed his problems on alcoholism. He also said that he had reformed and refused to yield to demands that he resign. He won reelection in November of 1980, with a plurality of 39 percent of the vote. Independent candidate Leslie B. McLemore received 30 percent, and Democrat Britt Singletary received 29 percent.

Hinson, who by this time was married, was arrested again on February 4, 1981, and charged with attempted sodomy for performing oral sex on a male employee of the Library of Congress in a restroom of the Longworth House Office Building. After an investigation prompted by complaints about similar incidents in the same restroom, Hinson was charged with sodomy.

At the time, homosexual acts, even between consenting adults, were a criminal offense in Washington, D.C. The charge was a felony that could have resulted in up to ten years in prison and fines of up to $10,000. Since both parties were consenting adults (and social attitudes were changing), the U.S. attorney's office reduced the charge to a misdemeanor. Facing a maximum penalty of one year in prison and a $1,000 fine, Hinson pleaded not guilty to a charge of attempted sodomy the following day and was released without bail pending a trial scheduled for May 4, 1981. Soon thereafter, he checked himself into Sibley Memorial Hospital for professional care. Hinson later received a 30-day suspended sentence and a year's probation, on condition that he continue counseling and treatment.

== Resignation and later life ==
Hinson resigned on April 13, 1981, just three months into his second term in the House. He said that his resignation had been "the most painful and difficult decision of my life". He was succeeded by Democrat Wayne Dowdy, who won the special election held in the summer of 1981.

After publicly acknowledging that he was gay, he became a gay rights activist, organizing lobbying groups and fighting against the ban on gays in the military. He lived the rest of his life in Alexandria, Virginia, and Silver Spring, Maryland.

== Death ==
Hinson died of respiratory failure resulting from AIDS in Silver Spring, Maryland, at the age of fifty-three.

Hinson's body was cremated. His ashes were buried in his native Tylertown, Mississippi, after a private service. By then divorced from his wife Cynthia, Hinson was survived by a brother, Robert Hinson of Gulfport, Mississippi.

== See also ==
- List of American federal politicians convicted of crimes
- List of federal political sex scandals in the United States
- List of LGBT members of the United States Congress

== Additional sources ==
- "Hinson, Facing a Morals Charge, Shuns Clamor to Quit Congress," The New York Times, 9 March 1981, A18;
- Associated Press, "Jon Hinson Dies at 53," July 25, 1995;
- Art Harris, "Hinson's Memory Haunts His Mississippi District," Washington Post, 17 June 1981.

U.S. House of Representatives
Preceded by Thad Cochran	Member of the U.S. House of Representatives from Mississippi's 4th congressional district 1979–1981	Succeeded by Wayne Dowdy
