= Wayne Dowdy =

American politician (born 1943)

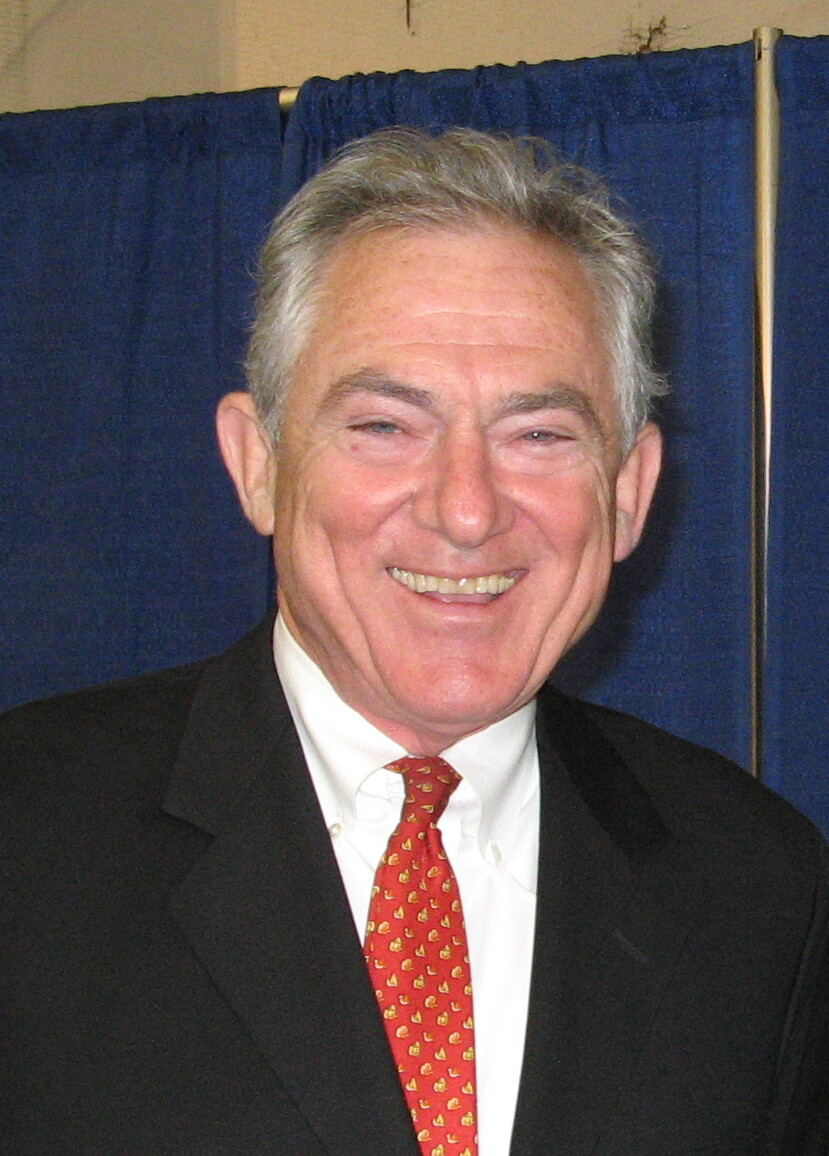

Chair of the Mississippi Democratic Party
- In office 2004–2008
- Preceded by: Rickey Cole
- Succeeded by: Jamie Franks (acting)

Member of the U.S. House of Representatives from Mississippi's 4th district
- In office July 7, 1981 – January 3, 1989
- Preceded by: Jon Hinson
- Succeeded by: Mike Parker

Personal details
- Born: Charles Wayne Dowdy; July 27, 1943 (age 83) Fitzgerald, Georgia, U.S.
- Party: Democratic
- Spouse: Susan Dowdy
- Children: 3
- Education: Millsaps College (BA); Mississippi College (LLB)

Charles Wayne Dowdy (born July 27, 1943) is an American politician, lawyer, and jurist from Mississippi. He was first elected in a 1981 special election and served four terms in the United States House of Representatives from 1981 to 1989. He later served as chairman of the Mississippi Democratic Party.

== Early life ==
Dowdy was born in Fitzgerald, Ben Hill County, Georgia. He grew up in the Methodist Church and is a graduate of Millsaps College in Jackson, Mississippi. He set up a law practice in Mississippi and purchased two local radio stations. He entered politics and was elected as mayor of McComb, Mississippi, serving from 1978 to 1981.

== Political career ==
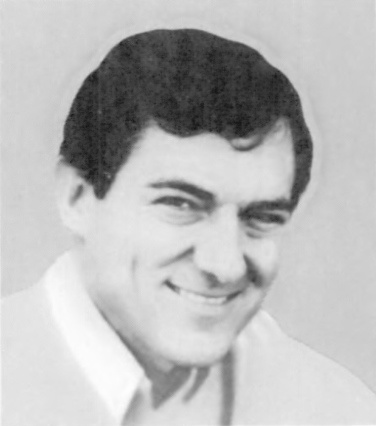
Dowdy during his final term in Congress.

On July 7, 1981, Dowdy was elected to the House of Representatives as a Democrat in a special election for the 4th District. In this election the Democrats recaptured a Southern district from the Republicans, in a period when the white electorate in the South was shifting to the Republican Party. Dowdy carefully managed to avoid drawing strong Republican challengers in the general election or African-American opponents in the Democratic primary.

He won re-election in 1982 and 1984, with 53% and 55% of the vote, before being re-elected with 72% of the vote in the 1986 elections. He was notable for being a rather progressive Democrat by Mississippi standards of the time; in 1982 he voted for renewal of the Voting Rights Act. He built a large base in the African-American community, important in a district with 37 percent African-American population.

In 1988, when John Stennis retired from the Senate, Dowdy won the Democratic nomination. His opponent was Republican House Minority Whip Trent Lott. Dowdy was unable to implement his rural strategy and lost to Lott by a 54% to 46% margin. He was severely hampered by George H. W. Bush carrying Mississippi with a 59% to 39% margin. He also lost badly in Lott's 5th congressional district, taking only 30% of the vote. Despite several Bush voters splitting their tickets to vote for Dowdy, it was not enough to overcome the Republican tide.

Dowdy attempted to stage a comeback against Governor Ray Mabus in the 1991 Democratic gubernatorial primary, but lost with 41 percent of the vote. Mabus would go on to lose the general election in a close race against Republican businessman Kirk Fordice. Dowdy later expressed regret for challenging Mabus, saying the governor "had some good achievements as governor, and frankly, I think that our spirited primary contributed to his loss for re-election."

== Post-political career ==
He returned and resumed his law practice in Magnolia, Mississippi. He practiced civil and trial law and represented Pike County and its Board of Supervisors, the City of Magnolia, and the Town of Summit.

He was elected and served as chairman of the Mississippi Democratic Party from 2004 to 2008.

He served as city attorney of McComb, Mississippi, from 2009 to 2018.

== Personal life ==
Dowdy is a Methodist. His wife, Susan is from Grenada, Mississippi. They have three children.

He practices law in Magnolia, Mississippi. His family owns several radio stations in Mississippi and Louisiana and is a former staff announcer for television station WJTV-TV in Jackson, Mississippi.

== Works cited ==
- Nash, Jere; Taggart, Andy (2009). Mississippi Politics: The Struggle for Power, 1976-2008 (second ed.). University Press of Mississippi. ISBN 9781604733570.

U.S. House of Representatives
Preceded by Jon Hinson	Member of the U.S. House of Representatives from Mississippi's 4th congressional district 1981–1989	Succeeded by Mike Parker
Party political offices
Preceded by John C. Stennis	Democratic nominee for U.S. Senator from Mississippi (Class 1); 1988	Succeeded by Ken Harper
U.S. order of precedence (ceremonial)
Preceded by Susan Brooks as Former U.S. Representative	Order of precedence of the United States as Former U.S. Representative	Succeeded by Randy Hultgren as Former U.S. Representative
