= 61st United States Congress =

1909-1911 U.S. Congress

←	60th	62nd	→
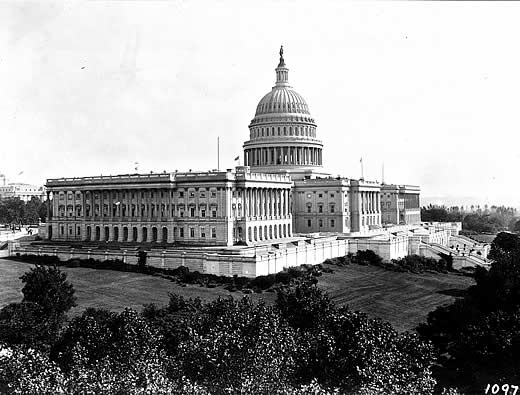
- United States Capitol (1906)

Overview
- Legislative body: United States Congress
- Jurisdiction: United States
- Term: March 4, 1909 – March 4, 1911

Senate
- Members: 92
- President: James S. Sherman (R)
- President pro tempore: William P. Frye (R)
- Party control: Republican

House of Representatives
- Members: 391 representatives 7 non-voting delegates
- Speaker: Joseph G. Cannon (R)
- Party control: Republican

Sessions
- Special (Note: Special session of the Senate.): March 4, 1909 – March 6, 1909
- 1st: March 15, 1909 – August 5, 1909
- 2nd: December 6, 1909 – June 25, 1910
- 3rd: December 5, 1910 – March 3, 1911

The 61st United States Congress was a meeting of the legislative branch of the United States federal government, composed of the United States Senate and the United States House of Representatives. It met in Washington, D.C., from March 4, 1909, to March 4, 1911, during the first two years of William H. Taft's presidency. The apportionment of seats in the House of Representatives was based on the 1900 United States census. Both chambers had a Republican majority.

== Major events ==
- March 4, 1909: William Howard Taft became President of the United States.

== Major legislation ==
- August 5, 1909 – Payne–Aldrich Tariff Act, ch. 6, 36 Stat. 11
- May 16, 1910: Federal Mines Safety Act of 1910, ch. 240, 36 Stat. 369-b
- June 1, 1910: Height of Buildings Act of 1910, ch. 263, 36 Stat. 452
- June 18, 1910: Mann–Elkins Act, ch. 309, 36 Stat. 539
- June 25, 1910: Mann Act, ch. 395, 36 Stat. 825
- March 3, 1911: Judicial Code of 1911, ch. 231, 36 Stat. 1087

== Constitutional amendments ==
- July 12, 1909: Approved an amendment to the United States Constitution allowing the Congress to levy an income tax without apportioning it among the states or basing it on the United States Census, and submitted it to the state legislatures for ratification
  - Amendment was later ratified on February 3, 1913, becoming the Sixteenth Amendment to the United States Constitution

== Party summary ==
=== Senate ===
	Party (shading shows control)		Total	Vacant
	Democratic (D)	Republican (R)	Total	Vacant
End of previous congress	31	61	92	0
Begin	32	59	91	1
End	32	59	91	1
Final voting share	35.2%	64.8%		
Beginning of next congress	40	50	90	2

=== House of Representatives ===
	Party (shading shows control)				Total	Vacant
	Democratic (D)	Independent Democratic (ID)	Republican (R)	Other (O)	Total	Vacant
End of previous congress	164	1	220	0	385	6
Begin	170	1	218	0	389	2
End	173	1	210	0	384	7
Final voting share	45.1%	0.3%	54.7%	0.0%		
Beginning of next congress	228	0	160	2 (Note: Progressive Republican & Socialist)	390	1

== Leadership ==
Senate president

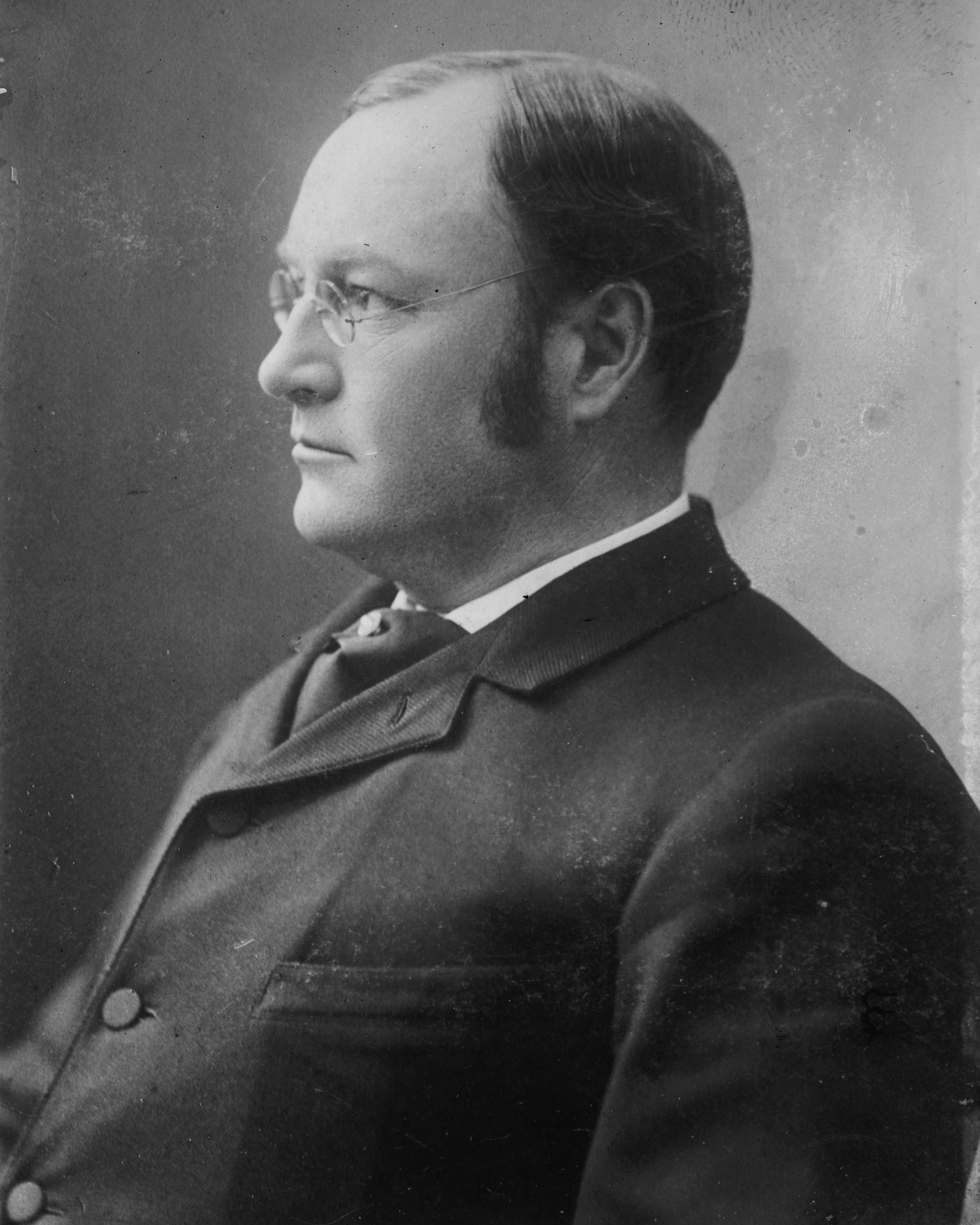
James S. Sherman (R)

Senate president pro tempore

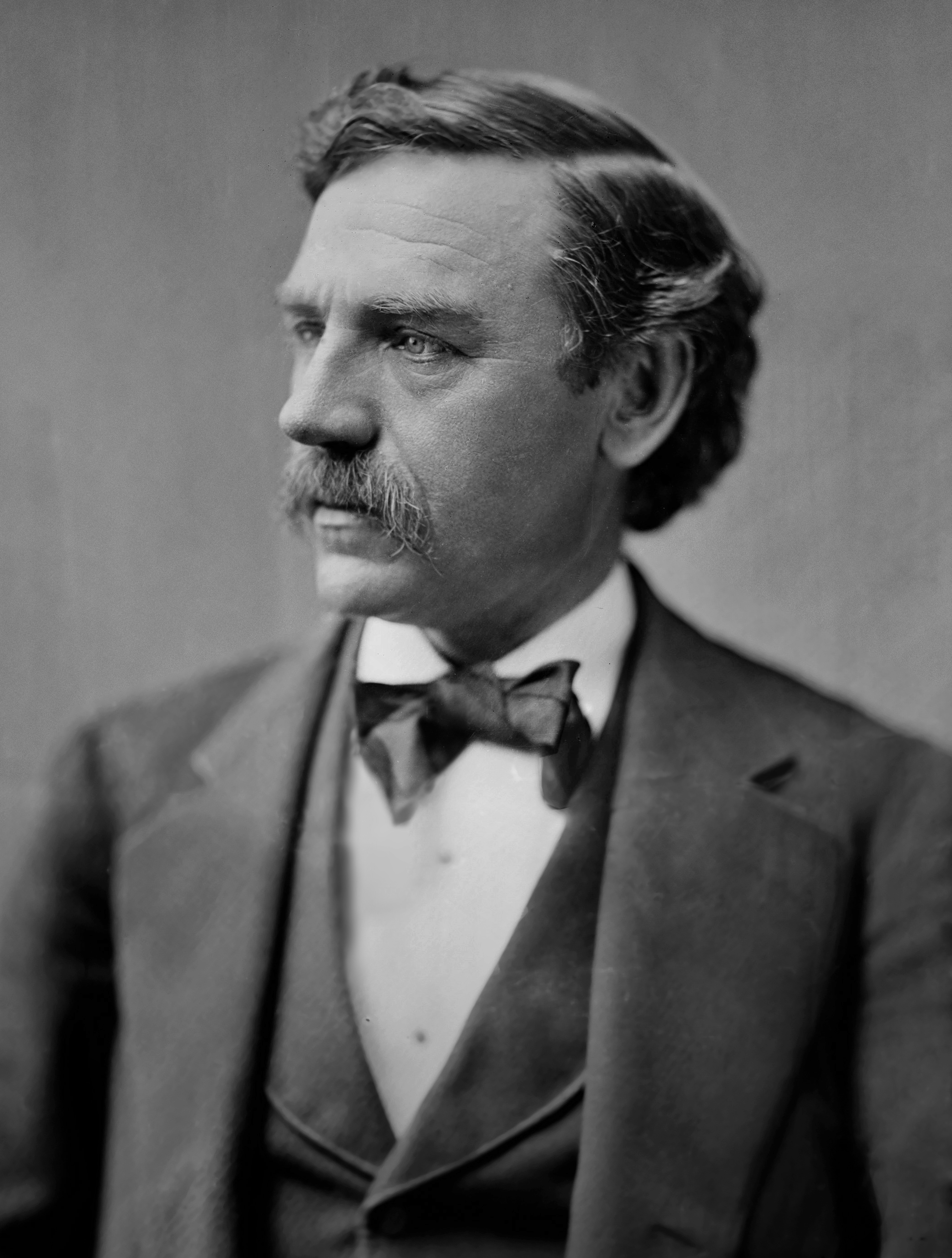
William P. Frye (R)

=== Senate ===
- President: James S. Sherman (R)
- President pro tempore: William P. Frye (R)
- Republican Conference Chairman: Eugene Hale
- Republican Conference Secretary: Charles Curtis
- Democratic Caucus Chairman: Hernando Money
- Democratic Caucus Secretary: Robert Latham Owen

=== House of Representatives ===
House Speaker

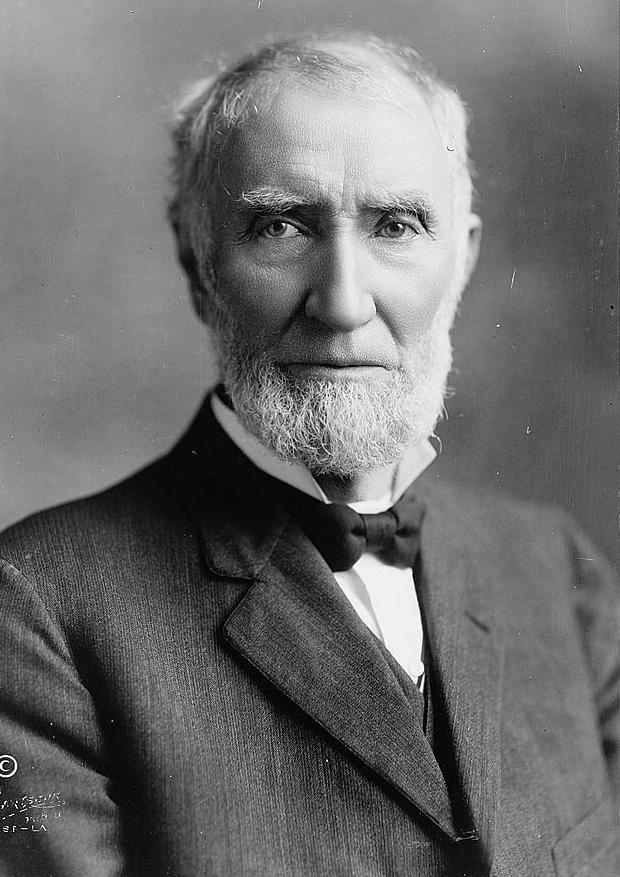
Joseph Gurney Cannon (R)

- Speaker: Joseph Gurney Cannon (R)

==== Majority (Republican) leadership ====
- Majority Leader: Sereno E. Payne
- Majority Whip: John W. Dwight
- Republican Conference Chairman: Frank Dunklee Currier

==== Minority (Democratic) leadership ====
- Minority Leader: Champ Clark
- Minority Whip: vacant
- Democratic Caucus Chairman: Henry De Lamar Clayton Jr.
- Democratic Campaign Committee Chairman: James Tilghman Lloyd

== Members ==
Skip to House of Representatives, below

=== Senate ===
At this time, most senators were elected by the state legislatures every two years, with one-third beginning new six-year terms with each Congress. A few senators were elected directly by the residents of the state. Preceding the names in the list below are Senate class numbers, which indicate the cycle of their election, In this Congress, Class 1 meant their term ended with this Congress, requiring reelection in 1910; Class 2 meant their term began in the last Congress, requiring reelection in 1912; and Class 3 meant their term began in this Congress, requiring reelection in 1914.

==== Alabama ====
▌2. John H. Bankhead (D)
▌3. Joseph F. Johnston (D)

==== Arkansas ====
▌2. Jeff Davis (D)
▌3. James P. Clarke (D)

==== California ====
▌1. Frank P. Flint (R)
▌3. George C. Perkins (R)

==== Colorado ====
▌2. Simon Guggenheim (R)
▌3. Charles J. Hughes Jr. (D), until January 11, 1911

==== Connecticut ====
▌1. Morgan G. Bulkeley (R)
▌3. Frank B. Brandegee (R)

==== Delaware ====
▌1. Henry A. du Pont (R)
▌2. Harry A. Richardson (R)

==== Florida ====
▌1. James P. Taliaferro (D)
▌3. Duncan U. Fletcher (D)

==== Georgia ====
▌2. Augustus O. Bacon (D)
▌3. Alexander S. Clay (D), until November 10, 1910

▌Joseph M. Terrell (D), from November 17, 1910

==== Idaho ====
▌2. William E. Borah (R)
▌3. Weldon B. Heyburn (R)

==== Illinois ====
▌2. Shelby Moore Cullom (R)
▌3. William Lorimer (R), from June 18, 1909

==== Indiana ====
▌1. Albert J. Beveridge (R)
▌3. Benjamin F. Shively (D)

==== Iowa ====
▌2. Jonathan P. Dolliver (R), until October 15, 1910

▌Lafayette Young (R), from November 12, 1910

▌3. Albert B. Cummins (R)

==== Kansas ====
▌2. Charles Curtis (R)
▌3. Joseph L. Bristow (R)

==== Kentucky ====
▌2. Thomas H. Paynter (D)
▌3. William O. Bradley (R)

==== Louisiana ====
▌2. Murphy J. Foster (D)
▌3. Samuel D. McEnery (D), until June 10, 1910

▌John Thornton (D), from December 10, 1910

==== Maine ====
▌1. Eugene Hale (R)
▌2. William P. Frye (R)

==== Maryland ====
▌1. Isidor Rayner (D)
▌3. John W. Smith (D)

==== Massachusetts ====
▌1. Henry Cabot Lodge (R)
▌2. Winthrop M. Crane (R)

==== Michigan ====
▌1. Julius C. Burrows (R)
▌2. William Alden Smith (R)

==== Minnesota ====
▌1. Moses E. Clapp (R)
▌2. Knute Nelson (R)

==== Mississippi ====
▌1. Hernando D. Money (D)
▌2. Anselm J. McLaurin (D), until December 22, 1909

▌James Gordon (D), December 27, 1909 – February 22, 1910
▌LeRoy Percy (D), from February 23, 1910

==== Missouri ====
▌1. William Warner (R)
▌3. William J. Stone (D)

==== Montana ====
▌1. Thomas H. Carter (R)
▌2. Joseph M. Dixon (R)

==== Nebraska ====
▌1. Elmer J. Burkett (R)
▌2. Norris Brown (R)

==== Nevada ====
▌1. George S. Nixon (R)
▌3. Francis G. Newlands (D)

==== New Hampshire ====
▌2. Henry E. Burnham (R)
▌3. Jacob H. Gallinger (R)

==== New Jersey ====
▌1. John Kean Jr. (R)
▌2. Frank O. Briggs (R)

==== New York ====
▌1. Chauncey M. Depew (R)
▌3. Elihu A. Root (R)

==== North Carolina ====
▌2. Furnifold M. Simmons (D)
▌3. Lee S. Overman (D)

==== North Dakota ====
▌1. Porter J. McCumber (R)
▌3. Martin N. Johnson (R), until October 21, 1909

▌Fountain L. Thompson (D), November 10, 1909 – January 31, 1910
▌William E. Purcell (D), February 1, 1910 – February 1, 1911
▌Asle Gronna (R), from February 2, 1911

==== Ohio ====
▌1. Charles W. F. Dick (R)
▌3. Theodore E. Burton (R)

==== Oklahoma ====
▌2. Robert L. Owen (D)
▌3. Thomas P. Gore (D)

==== Oregon ====
▌2. Jonathan Bourne Jr. (R)
▌3. George E. Chamberlain (D)

==== Pennsylvania ====
▌1. Philander C. Knox (R), until March 4, 1909

▌George T. Oliver (R), from March 17, 1909

▌3. Boies Penrose (R)

==== Rhode Island ====
▌1. Nelson W. Aldrich (R)
▌2. George P. Wetmore (R)

==== South Carolina ====
▌2. Benjamin R. Tillman (D)
▌3. Ellison D. Smith (D)

==== South Dakota ====
▌2. Robert J. Gamble (R)
▌3. Coe I. Crawford (R)

==== Tennessee ====
▌1. James B. Frazier (D)
▌2. Robert L. Taylor (D)

==== Texas ====
▌1. Charles A. Culberson (D)
▌2. Joseph W. Bailey (D)

==== Utah ====
▌1. George Sutherland (R)
▌3. Reed Smoot (R)

==== Vermont ====
▌1. Carroll S. Page (R)
▌3. William P. Dillingham (R)

==== Virginia ====
▌1. John W. Daniel (D), until June 29, 1910

▌Claude A. Swanson (D), from August 1, 1910

▌2. Thomas S. Martin (D)

==== Washington ====
▌1. Samuel H. Piles (R)
▌3. Wesley L. Jones (R)

==== West Virginia ====
▌1. Nathan B. Scott (R)
▌2. Stephen B. Elkins (R), until January 4, 1911

▌Davis Elkins (R), January 9, 1911 – January 31, 1911
▌Clarence W. Watson (D), from February 1, 1911

==== Wisconsin ====
▌1. Robert M. La Follette Sr. (R)
▌3. Isaac Stephenson (R)

==== Wyoming ====
▌1. Clarence D. Clark (R)
▌2. Francis E. Warren (R)

Senators' party membership by state at the opening of the 61st Congress in March 1909. 2 Democrats 1 Democrat and 1 Republican 2 Republicans Territories

=== House of Representatives ===
==== Alabama ====
▌1. George W. Taylor (D)
▌2. S. Hubert Dent Jr. (D)
▌3. Henry D. Clayton (D)
▌4. William B. Craig (D)
▌5. J. Thomas Heflin (D)
▌6. Richmond P. Hobson (D)
▌7. John L. Burnett (D)
▌8. William N. Richardson (D)
▌9. Oscar Underwood (D)

==== Arkansas ====
▌1. Robert B. Macon (D)
▌2. William A. Oldfield (D)
▌3. John C. Floyd (D)
▌4. William B. Cravens (D)
▌5. Charles C. Reid (D)
▌6. Joseph Taylor Robinson (D)
▌7. Robert M. Wallace (D)

==== California ====
▌1. William F. Englebright (R)
▌2. Duncan E. McKinlay (R)
▌3. Joseph R. Knowland (R)
▌4. Julius Kahn (R)
▌5. Everis A. Hayes (R)
▌6. James C. Needham (R)
▌7. James McLachlan (R)
▌8. Sylvester C. Smith (R)

==== Colorado ====
▌1. Atterson Walden Rucker (D)
▌2. John A. Martin (D)
▌At-large. Edward T. Taylor (D)

==== Connecticut ====
▌1. E. Stevens Henry (R)
▌2. Nehemiah D. Sperry (R)
▌3. Edwin W. Higgins (R)
▌4. Ebenezer J. Hill (R)
▌At-large. John Q. Tilson (R)

==== Delaware ====
▌At-large. William H. Heald (R)

==== Florida ====
▌1. Stephen M. Sparkman (D)
▌2. Frank Clark (D)
▌3. Dannite H. Mays (D)

==== Georgia ====
▌1. Charles G. Edwards (D)
▌2. James M. Griggs (D), until January 5, 1910

▌Seaborn Roddenbery (D), from February 6, 1910

▌3. Dudley M. Hughes (D)
▌4. William C. Adamson (D)
▌5. Leonidas F. Livingston (D)
▌6. Charles L. Bartlett (D)
▌7. Gordon Lee (D)
▌8. William M. Howard (D)
▌9. Thomas Montgomery Bell (D)
▌10. Thomas W. Hardwick (D)
▌11. William G. Brantley (D)

==== Idaho ====
▌At-large. Thomas Ray Hamer (R)

==== Illinois ====
▌1. Martin B. Madden (R)
▌2. James R. Mann (R)
▌3. William W. Wilson (R)
▌4. James T. McDermott (D)
▌5. Adolph J. Sabath (D)
▌6. William Lorimer (R), until June 17, 1909

▌William J. Moxley (R), from November 23, 1909

▌7. Frederick Lundin (R)
▌8. Thomas Gallagher (D)
▌9. Henry S. Boutell (R)
▌10. George E. Foss (R)
▌11. Howard M. Snapp (R)
▌12. Charles Eugene Fuller (R)
▌13. Frank O. Lowden (R)
▌14. James McKinney (R)
▌15. George W. Prince (R)
▌16. Joseph V. Graff (R)
▌17. John A. Sterling (R)
▌18. Joseph G. Cannon (R)
▌19. William B. McKinley (R)
▌20. Henry T. Rainey (D)
▌21. James M. Graham (D)
▌22. William A. Rodenberg (R)
▌23. Martin D. Foster (D)
▌24. Pleasant T. Chapman (R)
▌25. Napoleon B. Thistlewood (R)

==== Indiana ====
▌1. John W. Boehne (D)
▌2. William A. Cullop (D)
▌3. William E. Cox (D)
▌4. Lincoln Dixon (D)
▌5. Ralph Wilbur Moss (D)
▌6. William O. Barnard (R)
▌7. Charles A. Korbly (D)
▌8. John A. M. Adair (D)
▌9. Martin A. Morrison (D)
▌10. Edgar D. Crumpacker (R)
▌11. George W. Rauch (D)
▌12. Cyrus Cline (D)
▌13. Henry A. Barnhart (D)

==== Iowa ====
▌1. Charles A. Kennedy (R)
▌2. Albert F. Dawson (R)
▌3. Charles E. Pickett (R)
▌4. Gilbert N. Haugen (R)
▌5. James W. Good (R)
▌6. Nathan E. Kendall (R)
▌7. John A. T. Hull (R)
▌8. William Darius Jamieson (D)
▌9. Walter I. Smith (R)
▌10. Frank P. Woods (R)
▌11. Elbert H. Hubbard (R)

==== Kansas ====
▌1. Daniel Read Anthony Jr. (R)
▌2. Charles Frederick Scott (R)
▌3. Philip P. Campbell (R)
▌4. James Monroe Miller (R)
▌5. William A. Calderhead (R)
▌6. William A. Reeder (R)
▌7. Edmond H. Madison (R)
▌8. Victor Murdock (R)

==== Kentucky ====
▌1. Ollie M. James (D)
▌2. Augustus Stanley (D)
▌3. Robert Y. Thomas Jr. (D)
▌4. Ben Johnson (D)
▌5. J. Swagar Sherley (D)
▌6. Joseph L. Rhinock (D)
▌7. J. Campbell Cantrill (D)
▌8. Harvey Helm (D)
▌9. Joseph B. Bennett (R)
▌10. John W. Langley (R)
▌11. Don C. Edwards (R)

==== Louisiana ====
▌1. Albert Estopinal (D)
▌2. Samuel Louis Gilmore (D), March 30, 1909 – July 18, 1910

▌Henry Garland Dupré (D), from November 8, 1910

▌3. Robert F. Broussard (D)
▌4. John Thomas Watkins (D)
▌5. Joseph E. Ransdell (D)
▌6. Robert Charles Wickliffe (D)
▌7. Arsène Paulin Pujó (D)

==== Maine ====
▌1. Amos L. Allen (R), until February 20, 1911
▌2. John P. Swasey (R)
▌3. Edwin C. Burleigh (R)
▌4. Frank E. Guernsey (R)

==== Maryland ====
▌1. J. Harry Covington (D)
▌2. J. Frederick C. Talbott (D)
▌3. John Kronmiller (R)
▌4. John Gill Jr. (D)
▌5. Sydney E. Mudd (R)
▌6. George A. Pearre (R)

==== Massachusetts ====
▌1. George P. Lawrence (R)
▌2. Frederick H. Gillett (R)
▌3. Charles G. Washburn (R)
▌4. Charles Q. Tirrell (R), until July 31, 1910

▌John Joseph Mitchell (D), from November 8, 1910

▌5. Butler Ames (R)
▌6. Augustus P. Gardner (R)
▌7. Ernest W. Roberts (R)
▌8. Samuel W. McCall (R)
▌9. John A. Keliher (D)
▌10. Joseph F. O'Connell (D)
▌11. Andrew J. Peters (D)
▌12. John W. Weeks (R)
▌13. William S. Greene (R)
▌14. William C. Lovering (R), until February 4, 1910

▌Eugene Foss (D), March 22, 1910 – January 4, 1911

==== Michigan ====
▌1. Edwin C. Denby (R)
▌2. Charles E. Townsend (R)
▌3. Washington Gardner (R)
▌4. Edward L. Hamilton (R)
▌5. Gerrit J. Diekema (R)
▌6. Samuel W. Smith (R)
▌7. Henry McMorran (R)
▌8. Joseph W. Fordney (R)
▌9. James C. McLaughlin (R)
▌10. George A. Loud (R)
▌11. Francis H. Dodds (R)
▌12. H. Olin Young (R)

==== Minnesota ====
▌1. James Albertus Tawney (R)
▌2. Winfield Scott Hammond (D)
▌3. Charles Russell Davis (R)
▌4. Frederick C. Stevens (R)
▌5. Frank Nye (R)
▌6. Charles August Lindbergh (R)
▌7. Andrew Volstead (R)
▌8. Clarence B. Miller (R)
▌9. Halvor Steenerson (R)

==== Mississippi ====
▌1. Ezekiel S. Candler Jr. (D)
▌2. Thomas Spight (D)
▌3. Benjamin G. Humphreys II (D)
▌4. Thomas U. Sisson (D)
▌5. Adam M. Byrd (D)
▌6. Eaton J. Bowers (D)
▌7. William A. Dickson (D)
▌8. James W. Collier (D)

==== Missouri ====
▌1. James T. Lloyd (D)
▌2. William W. Rucker (D)
▌3. Joshua Willis Alexander (D)
▌4. Charles F. Booher (D)
▌5. William Patterson Borland (D)
▌6. David A. De Armond (D), until November 23, 1909

▌Clement C. Dickinson (D), from February 1, 1910

▌7. Courtney W. Hamlin (D)
▌8. Dorsey W. Shackleford (D)
▌9. James Beauchamp Clark (D)
▌10. Richard Bartholdt (R)
▌11. Patrick F. Gill (D)
▌12. Harry M. Coudrey (R)
▌13. Politte Elvins (R)
▌14. Charles A. Crow (R)
▌15. Charles H. Morgan (R)
▌16. Arthur P. Murphy (R)

==== Montana ====
▌At-large. Charles N. Pray (R)

==== Nebraska ====
▌1. John A. Maguire (D)
▌2. Gilbert M. Hitchcock (D)
▌3. James P. Latta (D)
▌4. Edmund H. Hinshaw (R)
▌5. George W. Norris (R)
▌6. Moses P. Kinkaid (R)

==== Nevada ====
▌At-large. George A. Bartlett (D)

==== New Hampshire ====
▌1. Cyrus A. Sulloway (R)
▌2. Frank Dunklee Currier (R)

==== New Jersey ====
▌1. Henry C. Loudenslager (R)
▌2. John J. Gardner (R)
▌3. Benjamin F. Howell (R)
▌4. Ira W. Wood (R)
▌5. Charles N. Fowler (R)
▌6. William Hughes (D)
▌7. Richard Wayne Parker (R)
▌8. William H. Wiley (R)
▌9. Eugene F. Kinkead (D)
▌10. James A. Hamill (D)

==== New York ====
▌1. William W. Cocks (R)
▌2. George H. Lindsay (D)
▌3. Otto G. Foelker (R)
▌4. Charles B. Law (R)
▌5. Richard Young (R)
▌6. William M. Calder (R)
▌7. John J. Fitzgerald (D)
▌8. Daniel J. Riordan (D)
▌9. Henry M. Goldfogle (D)
▌10. William Sulzer (D)
▌11. Charles V. Fornes (D)
▌12. Michael F. Conry (D)
▌13. Herbert Parsons (R)
▌14. William Willett Jr. (D)
▌15. J. Van Vechten Olcott (R)
▌16. Francis B. Harrison (D)
▌17. William S. Bennet (R)
▌18. Joseph A. Goulden (D)
▌19. John E. Andrus (R)
▌20. Thomas W. Bradley (R)
▌21. Hamilton Fish II (R)
▌22. William H. Draper (R)
▌23. George N. Southwick (R)
▌24. George W. Fairchild (R)
▌25. Cyrus Durey (R)
▌26. George R. Malby (R)
▌27. Charles S. Millington (R)
▌28. Charles L. Knapp (R)
▌29. Michael E. Driscoll (R)
▌30. John W. Dwight (R)
▌31. Sereno E. Payne (R)
▌32. James B. Perkins (R), until March 11, 1910

▌James Smith Havens (D), from April 19, 1910

▌33. J. Sloat Fassett (R)
▌34. James S. Simmons (R)
▌35. Daniel A. Driscoll (D)
▌36. De Alva S. Alexander (R)
▌37. Edward B. Vreeland (R)

==== North Carolina ====
▌1. John Humphrey Small (D)
▌2. Claude Kitchin (D)
▌3. Charles R. Thomas (D)
▌4. Edward W. Pou (D)
▌5. John M. Morehead (R)
▌6. Hannibal L. Godwin (D)
▌7. Robert N. Page (D)
▌8. Charles H. Cowles (R)
▌9. Edwin Y. Webb (D)
▌10. John G. Grant (R)

==== North Dakota ====
▌1. Louis B. Hanna (R)
▌2. Asle Gronna (R), until February 11, 1911

==== Ohio ====
▌1. Nicholas Longworth (R)
▌2. Herman P. Goebel (R)
▌3. James M. Cox (D)
▌4. William E. Tou Velle (D)
▌5. Timothy T. Ansberry (D)
▌6. Matthew R. Denver (D)
▌7. J. Warren Keifer (R)
▌8. Ralph D. Cole (R)
▌9. Isaac R. Sherwood (D)
▌10. Adna R. Johnson (R)
▌11. Albert Douglas (R)
▌12. Edward L. Taylor Jr. (R)
▌13. Carl C. Anderson (D)
▌14. William G. Sharp (D)
▌15. James Joyce (R)
▌16. David Hollingsworth (R)
▌17. William A. Ashbrook (D)
▌18. James Kennedy (R)
▌19. W. Aubrey Thomas (R)
▌20. L. Paul Howland (R)
▌21. James H. Cassidy (R), from April 20, 1909

==== Oklahoma ====
▌1. Bird Segle McGuire (R)
▌2. Dick Thompson Morgan (R)
▌3. Charles E. Creager (R)
▌4. Charles D. Carter (D)
▌5. Scott Ferris (D)

==== Oregon ====
▌1. Willis C. Hawley (R)
▌2. William R. Ellis (R)

==== Pennsylvania ====
▌1. Henry H. Bingham (R)
▌2. Joel Cook (R), until December 15, 1910
▌3. J. Hampton Moore (R)
▌4. Reuben O. Moon (R)
▌5. William W. Foulkrod (R), until November 13, 1910
▌6. George D. McCreary (R)
▌7. Thomas S. Butler (R)
▌8. Irving P. Wanger (R)
▌9. William W. Griest (R)
▌10. Thomas D. Nicholls (ID)
▌11. Henry W. Palmer (R)
▌12. Alfred B. Garner (R)
▌13. John H. Rothermel (D)
▌14. Charles C. Pratt (R)
▌15. William B. Wilson (D)
▌16. John G. McHenry (D)
▌17. Benjamin K. Focht (R)
▌18. Marlin E. Olmsted (R)
▌19. John M. Reynolds (R), until January 17, 1911
▌20. Daniel F. Lafean (R)
▌21. Charles F. Barclay (R)
▌22. George F. Huff (R)
▌23. Allen F. Cooper (R)
▌24. John K. Tener (R), until January 16, 1911
▌25. Arthur L. Bates (R)
▌26. A. Mitchell Palmer (D)
▌27. J. N. Langham (R)
▌28. Nelson P. Wheeler (R)
▌29. William H. Graham (R)
▌30. John Dalzell (R)
▌31. James F. Burke (R)
▌32. Andrew J. Barchfeld (R)

==== Rhode Island ====
▌1. William P. Sheffield Jr. (R)
▌2. Adin B. Capron (R)

==== South Carolina ====
▌1. George S. Legare (D)
▌2. James O. Patterson (D)
▌3. Wyatt Aiken (D)
▌4. Joseph T. Johnson (D)
▌5. David E. Finley (D)
▌6. J. Edwin Ellerbe (D)
▌7. Asbury F. Lever (D)

==== South Dakota ====
▌At-large. Charles H. Burke (R)
▌At-large. Eben W. Martin (R)

==== Tennessee ====
▌1. Walter P. Brownlow (R), until July 8, 1910

▌Zachary D. Massey (R), from November 8, 1910

▌2. Richard W. Austin (R)
▌3. John A. Moon (D)
▌4. Cordell Hull (D)
▌5. William C. Houston (D)
▌6. Joseph W. Byrns (D)
▌7. Lemuel P. Padgett (D)
▌8. Thetus W. Sims (D)
▌9. Finis J. Garrett (D)
▌10. George W. Gordon (D)

==== Texas ====
▌1. Morris Sheppard (D)
▌2. Martin Dies (D)
▌3. Gordon J. Russell (D), until June 14, 1910

▌Robert M. Lively (D), from July 23, 1910

▌4. Choice B. Randell (D)
▌5. James Andrew Beall (D)
▌6. Rufus Hardy (D)
▌7. Alexander W. Gregg (D)
▌8. John M. Moore (D)
▌9. George Farmer Burgess (D)
▌10. Albert S. Burleson (D)
▌11. Robert L. Henry (D)
▌12. Oscar W. Gillespie (D)
▌13. John H. Stephens (D)
▌14. James L. Slayden (D)
▌15. John Nance Garner (D)
▌16. William R. Smith (D)

==== Utah ====
▌At-large. Joseph Howell (R)

==== Vermont ====
▌1. David J. Foster (R)
▌2. Frank Plumley (R)

==== Virginia ====
▌1. William A. Jones (D)
▌2. Harry L. Maynard (D)
▌3. John Lamb (D)
▌4. Francis R. Lassiter (D), until October 31, 1909

▌Robert Turnbull (D), from March 8, 1910

▌5. Edward W. Saunders (D)
▌6. Carter Glass (D)
▌7. James Hay (D)
▌8. Charles Creighton Carlin (D)
▌9. C. Bascom Slemp (R)
▌10. Henry D. Flood (D)

==== Washington ====
▌1. William E. Humphrey (R)
▌2. Francis W. Cushman (R), until July 6, 1909

▌William W. McCredie (R), from November 2, 1909

▌3. Miles Poindexter (R)

==== West Virginia ====
▌1. William P. Hubbard (R)
▌2. George Cookman Sturgiss (R)
▌3. Joseph Holt Gaines (R)
▌4. Harry C. Woodyard (R)
▌5. James Anthony Hughes (R)

==== Wisconsin ====
▌1. Henry Allen Cooper (R)
▌2. John M. Nelson (R)
▌3. Arthur W. Kopp (R)
▌4. William J. Cary (R)
▌5. William H. Stafford (R)
▌6. Charles H. Weisse (D)
▌7. John J. Esch (R)
▌8. James H. Davidson (R)
▌9. Gustav Küstermann (R)
▌10. Elmer A. Morse (R)
▌11. Irvine L. Lenroot (R)

==== Wyoming ====
▌At-large. Frank W. Mondell (R)

==== Non-voting members ====
▌Alaska Territory. James Wickersham (R)
▌Arizona Territory. Ralph Henry Cameron (R)
▌Hawaii Territory. Jonah Kunio Kalanianaole (R)
▌New Mexico Territory. William Henry Andrews (R)
▌Philippines. Benito Legarda (Fed., R)
▌Philippines. Pablo Ocampo, until November 22, 1909 (Nac., D)

▌Manuel Quezon, (Nacionalista), from November 23, 1909

▌Puerto Rico. Tulio Larrínaga (Resident Commissioner), (Unionist)

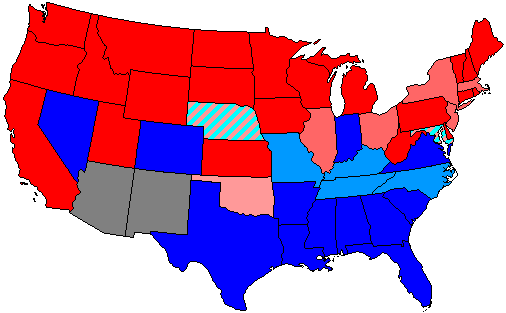
House seats by party holding plurality in state: 80+% Democratic / 80+% Republican; 60+% to 80% Democratic / 60+% to 80% Republican; Up to 60% Democratic / Up to 60% Republican

== Changes in membership ==
The count below reflects changes from the beginning of the first session of this Congress.

=== Senate ===
- Replacements: 13
  - Democratic: 1 seat net gain
  - Republican: 1 seat net loss
- Deaths: 8
- Resignations: 2
- Vacancy: 1
- Total seats with changes: 14

State (class)	Vacated by	Reason for vacancy	Subsequent	Date of successor's installation
Illinois (3)	Vacant	Sen. was elected at beginning of term. Served in House until resigning June 18, 1909	William Lorimer (R)	June 18, 1909
Pennsylvania (1)	Philander C. Knox (R)	Resigned March 4, 1909, after being appointed United States Secretary of State. Successor was elected.	George T. Oliver (R)	March 17, 1909
North Dakota (3)	Martin N. Johnson (R)	Died October 21, 1909. Successor was appointed.	Fountain L. Thompson (D)	November 10, 1909
Mississippi (2)	Anselm J. McLaurin (D)	Died December 22, 1909. Successor was appointed.	James Gordon (D)	December 27, 1909
North Dakota (3)	Fountain L. Thompson (D)	Resigned January 31, 1910. Successor was appointed.	William E. Purcell (D)	February 1, 1910
Mississippi (2)	James Gordon (D)	Successor was elected.	LeRoy Percy (D)	February 23, 1910
Louisiana (3)	Samuel D. McEnery (D)	Died June 28, 1910. Successor was appointed and subsequently elected.	John Thornton (D)	December 7, 1910
Virginia (1)	John W. Daniel (D)	Died June 29, 1910. Successor was appointed.	Claude A. Swanson (D)	August 1, 1910
Iowa (2)	Jonathan P. Dolliver (R)	Died October 15, 1910	Lafayette Young (R)	November 12, 1910
Georgia (3)	Alexander S. Clay (D)	Died November 13, 1910. Successor was appointed.	Joseph M. Terrell (D)	November 17, 1910
West Virginia (2)	Stephen B. Elkins (R)	Died January 4, 1911. Successor was appointed.	Davis Elkins (R)	January 9, 1911
Colorado (3)	Charles J. Hughes Jr. (D)	Died January 11, 1911.	Vacant until next Congress	
West Virginia (2)	Davis Elkins (R)	Successor was elected.	Clarence W. Watson (D)	February 1, 1911
North Dakota (3)	William E. Purcell (D)	Successor was elected.	Asle Gronna (R)	February 2, 1911

=== House of Representatives ===
- Replacements: 12
  - Democratic: 3 seat gain
  - Republican: 3 seat loss
- Deaths: 12
- Resignations: 6
- Contested elections: 0
- Total seats with changes: 21

District	Vacated by	Reason for vacancy	Successor	Date of successor's installation
Louisiana 2nd	Vacant	Rep. Robert C. Davey died during previous congress	Samuel L. Gilmore (D)	March 30, 1909
Ohio 21st	Vacant	Rep. Theodore E. Burton resigned during previous congress	James H. Cassidy (R)	April 20, 1909
Illinois 6th	William Lorimer (R)	Resigned June 17, 1909, after being elected to the U.S. Senate	William Moxley (R)	November 23, 1909
Washington 2nd	Francis W. Cushman (R)	Died July 6, 1909	William W. McCredie (R)	November 2, 1909
Virginia 4th	Francis R. Lassiter (D)	Died October 31, 1909	Robert Turnbull (D)	March 8, 1910
Philippines Resident Commissioner	Pablo Ocampo	Term ended November 22, 1909	Manuel L. Quezon (Unionist)	November 23, 1909
Missouri 6th	David A. De Armond (D)	Died November 23, 1909	Clement C. Dickinson (D)	February 1, 1910
Georgia 2nd	James M. Griggs (D)	Died January 5, 1910	Seaborn Roddenbery (D)	February 6, 1910
Massachusetts 14th	William C. Lovering (R)	Died March 11, 1910	Eugene Foss (D)	January 4, 1911
New York 32nd	James B. Perkins (R)	Died February 4, 1910	James S. Havens (D)	April 19, 1910
Texas 3rd	Gordon J. Russell (D)	Resigned June 14, 1910, after being appointed judge for the United States District Court for the Eastern District of Texas	Robert M. Lively (D)	July 23, 1910
Tennessee 1st	Walter P. Brownlow (R)	Died July 8, 1910	Zachary D. Massey (R)	November 8, 1910
Louisiana 2nd	Samuel L. Gilmore (D)	Died July 18, 1910	H. Garland Dupré (D)	November 8, 1910
Massachusetts 4th	Charles Q. Tirrell (R)	Died July 31, 1910	John J. Mitchell (D)	November 8, 1910
Pennsylvania 5th	William W. Foulkrod (R)	Died November 13, 1910	Seat remained vacant until next Congress	
Pennsylvania 2nd	Joel Cook (R)	Died December 15, 1910	Seat remained vacant until next Congress	
Massachusetts 14th	Eugene Foss (D)	Resigned January 4, 1911, after being elected Governor of Massachusetts	Seat remained vacant until next Congress	
Pennsylvania 24th	John K. Tener (R)	Resigned January 16, 1911, after being elected Governor of Pennsylvania	Seat remained vacant until next Congress	
Pennsylvania 19th	John M. Reynolds (R)	Resigned January 17, 1911, after being elected Lieutenant Governor of Pennsylvania	Seat remained vacant until next Congress	
North Dakota 2nd	Asle Gronna (R)	Resigned February 11, 1911, after being elected to the U.S. Senate	Seat remained vacant until next Congress	
Maine 1st	Amos L. Allen (R)	Died February 20, 1911	Seat remained vacant until next Congress	

== Committees ==
Lists of committees and their party leaders for members of the House and Senate committees can be found through the Official Congressional Directory at the bottom of this article. The directory after the pages of terms of service lists committees of the Senate, House (Standing with Subcommittees, Select and Special) and Joint and, after that, House/Senate committee assignments. On the committees section of the House and Senate in the Official Congressional Directory, the committee's members on the first row on the left side shows the chairman of the committee and on the right side shows the ranking member of the committee.

=== Senate ===
- Additional Accommodations for the Library of Congress (Select) (Chairman: Charles A. Culberson; Ranking Member: Shelby M. Cullom)
- Agriculture and Forestry (Chairman: Jonathan P. Dolliver; Ranking Member: Hernando D. Money)
- Appropriations (Chairman: Eugene Hale; Ranking Member: Benjamin R. Tillman)
- Audit and Control the Contingent Expenses of the Senate (Chairman: John Kean; Ranking Member: Hernando D. Money)
- Canadian Relations (Chairman: William A. Smith; Ranking Member: Benjamin R. Tillman)
- Census (Chairman: Robert M. La Follette; Ranking Member: Samuel D. McEnery)
- Civil Service and Retrenchment (Chairman: Albert B. Cummins; Ranking Member: N/A)
- Claims (Chairman: Henry E. Burnham; Ranking Member: Thomas S. Martin)
- Coast and Insular Survey (Chairman: Samuel H. Piles; Ranking Member: Alexander S. Clay)
- Coast Defenses (Chairman: George S. Nixon; Ranking Member: James P. Taliaferro)
- Commerce (Chairman: William P. Frye; Ranking Member: Thomas S. Martin)
- Conservation of National Resources (Chairman: Joseph M. Dixon; Ranking Member: Francis G. Newlands)
- Corporations Organized in the District of Columbia (Chairman: James P. Taliaferro; Ranking Member: Norris Brown)
- Cuban Relations (Chairman: George Sutherland; Ranking Member: Jacob H. Gallinger)
- Disposition of Useless Papers in the Executive Departments (Chairman: Furnifold M. Simmons; Ranking Member: Jacob H. Gallinger)
- Distributing Public Revenue Among the States (Select)
- District of Columbia (Chairman: Jacob H. Gallinger; Ranking Member: Norris Brown)
- Education and Labor (Chairman: William E. Borah; Ranking Member: John W. Daniel)
- Engrossed Bills (Chairman: Augustus O. Bacon; Ranking Member: Henry Cabot Lodge)
- Enrolled Bills (Chairman: Robert J. Gamble; Ranking Member: Murphy J. Foster)
- Establish a University in the United States (Select) (Chairman: Simon Guggenheim)
- Examination of Disposition of Documents (Select)
- Examine the Several Branches in the Civil Service (Chairman: Isaac Stephenson; Ranking Member: Charles A. Culberson)
- Expenditures in the Department of Agriculture (Chairman: Harry A. Richardson; Ranking Member: Furnifold M. Simmons)
- Expenditures in the Interior Department (Chairman: Coe I. Crawford; Ranking Member: Jeff Davis)
- Expenditures in the Department of Justice (Select) (Chairman: William O. Bradley; Ranking Member: Joseph W. Bailey)
- Expenditures in the Navy Department (Select) (Chairman: William Lorimer; Ranking Member: Thomas S. Martin)
- Expenditures in the Post Office Department (Chairman: Joseph L. Bristow; Ranking Member: Augustus O. Bacon)
- Expenditures in the Department of State (Select) (Chairman: Elihu Root; Ranking Member: N/A)
- Expenditures in the Treasury Department (Select) (Chairman: Theodore E. Burton; Ranking Member: James P. Clarke)
- Expenditures in the War Department (Select) (Chairman: Henry A. du Pont; Ranking Member: Hernando D. Money)
- Finance (Chairman: Nelson W. Aldrich; Ranking Member: John W. Daniel)
- Fisheries (Chairman: Jonathan Bourne Jr.; Ranking Member: Samuel D. McEnery)
- Five Civilized Tribes of Indians (Select) (Chairman: Benjamin R. Tillman; Ranking Member: Moses E. Clapp)
- Foreign Relations (Chairman: Shelby M. Cullom; Ranking Member: Augustus O. Bacon)
- Forest Reservations and the Protection of Game (Chairman: Frank B. Brandegee; Ranking Member: Benjamin R. Tillman)
- Geological Survey (Chairman: Frank O. Briggs; Ranking Member: Hernando D. Money)
- Immigration (Chairman: William P. Dillingham; Ranking Member: N/A)
- Indian Affairs (Chairman: Moses E. Clapp; Ranking Member: William J. Stone)
- Indian Depredations (Chairman: Charles Curtis; Ranking Member: Thomas S. Martin)
- Indian Contracts Investigation (Select)
- Industrial Expositions (Chairman: Wesley L. Jones; Ranking Member: John W. Daniel)
- Interoceanic Canals (Chairman: Frank P. Flint; Ranking Member: James P. Taliaferro)
- Interstate Commerce (Chairman: Stephen B. Elkins; Ranking Member: Benjamin R. Tillman)
- Irrigation and Reclamation of Arid Lands (Chairman: Thomas H. Carter; Ranking Member: Joseph W. Bailey)
- Judiciary (Chairman: Clarence D. Clark; Ranking Member: Augustus O. Bacon)
- Library (Chairman: George P. Wetmore; Ranking Member: John W. Daniel)
- Manufactures (Chairman: Weldon B. Heyburn; Ranking Member: Alexander S. Clay)
- Military Affairs (Chairman: Francis E. Warren; Ranking Member: James P. Taliaferro)
- Mines and Mining (Chairman: Charles Dick; Ranking Member: Benjamin R. Tillman)
- Mississippi River and its Tributaries (Select) (Chairman: William Warner; Ranking Member: Samuel D. McEnery)
- National Banks (Chairman: N/A; Ranking Member: N/A)
- Naval Affairs (Chairman: George C. Perkins; Ranking Member: Benjamin R. Tillman)
- Pacific Islands and Puerto Rico (Chairman: Chauncey M. Depew; Ranking Member: James P. Clarke)
- Pacific Railroads (Chairman: Elmer J. Burkett; Ranking Member: James P. Taliaferro)
- Patents (Chairman: Norris Brown; Ranking Member: Murphy J. Foster Jr.)
- Pensions (Chairman: Porter J. McCumber; Ranking Member: James P. Taliaferro)
- Philippines (Chairman: Henry Cabot Lodge; Ranking Member: Joseph F. Johnston)
- Post Office and Post Roads (Chairman: Boies Penrose; Ranking Member: Alexander S. Clay)
- Potomac River Front (Select)
- Printing (Chairman: Reed Smoot; Ranking Member: John W. Smith)
- Private Land Claims (Chairman: John W. Daniel; Ranking Member: Julius Kahn)
- Privileges and Elections (Chairman: Julius C. Burrows; Ranking Member: John Kean)
- Public Buildings and Grounds (Chairman: Nathan B. Scott; Ranking Member: Charles A. Culberson)
- Public Expenditures (Chairman: Eugene Hale; Ranking Member: N/A)
- Public Health and National Quarantine (Chairman: Thomas S. Martin; Ranking Member: Chauncey M. Depew)
- Public Lands (Chairman: Knute Nelson; Ranking Member: Samuel D. McEnery)
- Railroads (Chairman: Morgan G. Bulkeley; Ranking Member: Augustus O. Bacon)
- Revision of the Laws (Chairman: Weldon B. Heyburn; Ranking Member: N/A)
- Revolutionary Claims (Chairman: Joseph W. Bailey; Ranking Member: William O. Bradley)
- Rules (Chairman: Winthrop Murray Crane; Ranking Member: Augustus O. Bacon)
- Standards, Weights and Measures (Select) (Chairman: Carroll S. Page; Ranking Member: Augustus O. Bacon)
- Tariff Regulation (Select)
- Territories (Chairman: Albert J. Beveridge; Ranking Member: James P. Clarke)
- Third Degree Ordeal
- Transportation and Sale of Meat Products (Select) (Chairman: Samuel D. McEnery; Ranking Member: John W. Daniel)
- Transportation Routes to the Seaboard (Chairman: George T. Oliver; Ranking Member: John W. Daniel)
- Trespassers upon Indian Lands (Select) (Chairman: N/A; Ranking Member: N/A)
- Wages and Prices of Commodities (Select)
- Whole
- Woman Suffrage (Chairman: Alexander S. Clay; Ranking Member: Albert J. Beveridge)

=== House of Representatives ===
- Accounts (Chairman: James A. Hughes; Ranking Member: Charles L. Bartlett)
- Agriculture (Chairman: Charles Frederick Scott; Ranking Member: John Lamb)
- Alcoholic Liquor Traffic (Chairman: Nehemiah D. Sperry; Ranking Member: Ezekiel S. Candler Jr.)
- Appropriations (Chairman: James A. Tawney; Ranking Member: Leonidas F. Livingston)
- Banking and Currency (Chairman: Edward B. Vreeland; Ranking Member: Arsene Pujo)
- Census (Chairman: Edgar D. Crumpacker; Ranking Member: James Hay)
- Claims (Chairman: George W. Prince; Ranking Member: Henry M. Goldfogle)
- Coinage, Weights and Measures (Chairman: William B. McKinley; Ranking Member: Thomas W. Hardwick)
- Disposition of Executive Papers (Chairman: Arthur L. Bates; Ranking Member: Joshua Frederick Cockey Talbott)
- District of Columbia (Chairman: Samuel W. Smith; Ranking Member: Dorsey W. Shackleford)
- Education (Chairman: James F. Burke; Ranking Member: Asbury F. Lever)
- Election of the President, Vice President and Representatives in Congress (Chairman: Joseph H. Gaines; Ranking Member: William W. Rucker)
- Elections No.#1 (Chairman: Charles L. Knapp; Ranking Member: Ollie M. James)
- Elections No.#2 (Chairman: James M. Miller; Ranking Member: William E. Tou Velle)
- Elections No.#3 (Chairman: Michael E. Driscoll; Ranking Member: Charles C. Carlin)
- Enrolled Bills (Chairman: William W. Wilson; Ranking Member: Henry Thomas Rainey)
- Expenditures in the Agriculture Department (Chairman: William H. Graham; Ranking Member: Henry D. Flood)
- Expenditures in the Commerce and Labor Departments (Chairman: David J. Foster; Ranking Member: Arsene P. Pujo)
- Expenditures in the Interior Department (Chairman: Bird S. McGuire; Ranking Member: Robert N. Page)
- Expenditures in the Justice Department (Chairman: Sydney E. Mudd; Ranking Member: Henry M. Goldfogle)
- Expenditures in the Navy Department (Chairman: Henry S. Boutell; Ranking Member: Lemuel P. Padgett)
- Expenditures in the Post Office Department (Chairman: Irving P. Wanger; Ranking Member: Carter Glass)
- Expenditures in the State Department (Chairman: Don C. Edwards; Ranking Member: Courtney W. Hamlin)
- Expenditures in the Treasury Department (Chairman: Ebenezer J. Hill; Ranking Member: John Lamb)
- Expenditures in the War Department (Chairman: George P. Lawrence; Ranking Member: Joseph L. Rhinock)
- Expenditures on Public Buildings (Chairman: E. Stevens Henry; Ranking Member: John H. Small)
- Foreign Affairs (Chairman: James B. Perkins; Ranking Member: William M. Howard)
- Immigration and Naturalization (Chairman: Benjamin F. Howell; Ranking Member: John L. Burnett)
- Indian Affairs (Chairman: Charles H. Burke; Ranking Member: John H. Stephens)
- Industrial Arts and Expositions (Chairman: William A. Rodenberg; Ranking Member: Harry L. Maynard)
- Insular Affairs (Chairman: Marlin E. Olmsted; Ranking Member: William A. Jones)
- Interstate and Foreign Commerce (Chairman: James R. Mann; Ranking Member: William C. Adamson)
- Invalid Pensions (Chairman: Cyrus A. Sulloway; Ranking Member: George H. Lindsay)
- Irrigation of Arid Lands (Chairman: William A. Reeder; Ranking Member: William R. Smith)
- Judiciary (Chairman: Richard W. Parker; Ranking Member: Henry De Lamar Clayton)
- Labor (Chairman: John J. Gardner; Ranking Member: Henry Thomas Rainey)
- Levees and Improvements of the Mississippi River (Chairman: Philip P. Campbell; Ranking Member: Robert B. Macon)
- Library (Chairman: Samuel W. McCall; Ranking Member: William M. Howard)
- Manufactures (Chairman: Henry McMorran; Ranking Member: Joseph T. Johnson)
- Merchant Marine and Fisheries (Chairman: William S. Greene; Ranking Member: Thomas Spight)
- Mileage (Chairman: Charles A. Kennedy; Ranking Member: Matthew R. Denver)
- Military Affairs (Chairman: John A.T. Hull; Ranking Member: William Sulzer)
- Militia (Chairman: Halvor Steenerson; Ranking Member: John Gill Jr.)
- Mines and Mining (Chairman: George F. Huff; Ranking Member: George A. Bartlett)
- Naval Affairs (Chairman: George E. Foss; Ranking Member: Lemuel P. Padgett)
- Pacific Railroads (Chairman: Thomas S. Butler; Ranking Member: James L. Slayden)
- Patents (Chairman: Frank D. Currier; Ranking Member: William Sulzer)
- Pensions (Chairman: Henry C. Loudenslager; Ranking Member: William Richardson)
- Post Office and Post Roads (Chairman: John W. Weeks; Ranking Member: John A. Moon)
- Printing (Chairman: Allen F. Cooper; Ranking Member: David E. Finley)
- Private Land Claims (Chairman: Ernest W. Roberts; Ranking Member: William A. Jones)
- Public Buildings and Grounds (Chairman: Richard Bartholdt; Ranking Member: William G. Brantley)
- Public Lands (Chairman: Frank W. Mondell; Ranking Member: Adam M. Byrd)
- Railways and Canals (Chairman: James H. Davidson; Ranking Member: William Hughes)
- Reform in the Civil Service (Chairman: Frederick H. Gillett; Ranking Member: William O. Barnard)
- Revision of Laws (Chairman: Reuben O. Moon; Ranking Member: John T. Watkins)
- Rivers and Harbors (Chairman: De Alva S. Alexander; Ranking Member: Stephen M. Sparkman)
- Rules (Chairman: John Dalzell; Ranking Member: Champ Clark)
- Standards of Official Conduct
- Territories (Chairman: Edward L. Hamilton; Ranking Member: James T. Lloyd)
- Ventilation and Acoustics (Chairman: George D. McCreary; Ranking Member: George W. Rauch)
- War Claims (Chairman: Charles B. Law; Ranking Member: Thetus W. Sims)
- Ways and Means (Chairman: Sereno E. Payne; Ranking Member: Champ Clark)
- Whole

=== Joint committees ===
- Conditions of Indian Tribes (Special)
- Disposition of (Useless) Executive Papers
- Investigate the Interior Department and Forestry Service
- The Library
- Printing

== Caucuses ==
- Democratic (House)
- Democratic (Senate)

== Employees ==
=== Legislative branch agency directors ===
- Architect of the Capitol: Elliott Woods
- Librarian of Congress: Herbert Putnam
- Public Printer of the United States: Samuel B. Donnelly

=== Senate ===
- Chaplain: Edward E. Hale (Unitarian) until June 10, 1909
  - Ulysses G.B. Pierce (Unitarian) elected June 18, 1909
- Librarian: Edward C. Goodwin
- Secretary: Charles G. Bennett
- Sergeant at Arms: Daniel M. Ransdell

=== House of Representatives ===
- Chaplain: Henry N. Couden (Universalist)
- Clerk: Alexander McDowell
- Doorkeeper: Frank B. Lyon
- Clerk at the Speaker's Table: Asher C. Hinds
- Postmaster: Samuel Langum
- Reading Clerks: E. L. Sampson (D) and Dennis E. Alward (R)
- Sergeant at Arms: Henry Casson

== See also ==
- 1908 United States elections (elections leading to this Congress)
  - 1908 United States presidential election
  - 1908–09 United States Senate elections
  - 1908 United States House of Representatives elections
- 1910 United States elections (elections during this Congress, leading to the next Congress)
  - 1910–11 United States Senate elections
  - 1910 United States House of Representatives elections
