= Henry C. Hansbrough =

American politician (1848–1933)

Henry Clay Hansbrough
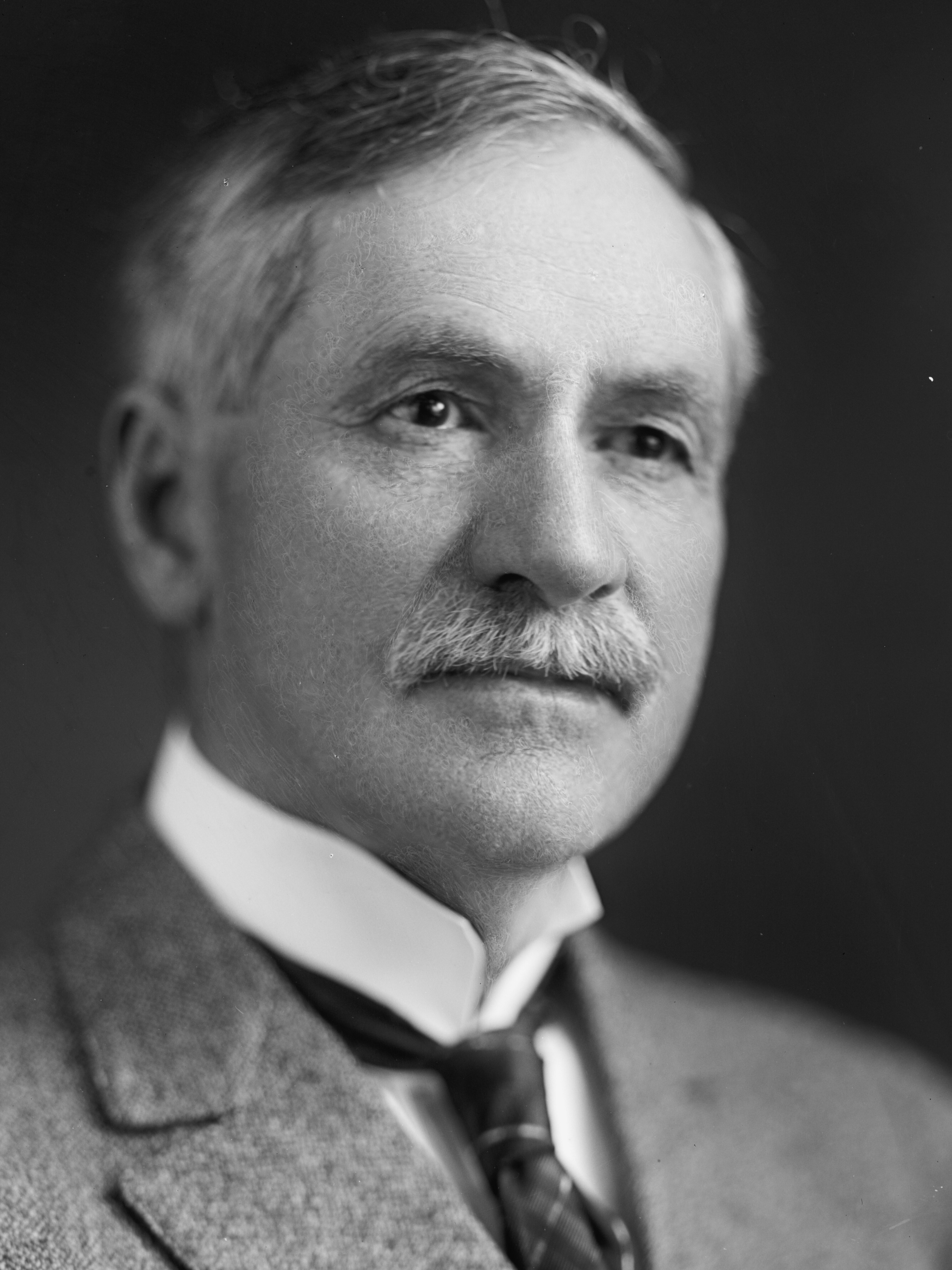

United States Senator from North Dakota
- In office March 4, 1891 – March 3, 1909
- Preceded by: Gilbert A. Pierce
- Succeeded by: Martin N. Johnson

Member of the U.S. House of Representatives from North Dakota's at-large district
- In office November 2, 1889 – March 3, 1891
- Preceded by: Constituency established
- Succeeded by: Martin N. Johnson

Personal details
- Born: January 30, 1848 Prairie du Rocher, Illinois, U.S.
- Died: November 16, 1933 (aged 85) Washington, D.C., U.S.
- Party: Republican
- Spouse: Mary Berri Chapman Hansbrough
- Profession: Printing

Henry Clay Hansbrough (January 30, 1848 – November 16, 1933) was a United States politician who served as the first United States representative from North Dakota, as well as a senator from North Dakota.

== Biography ==
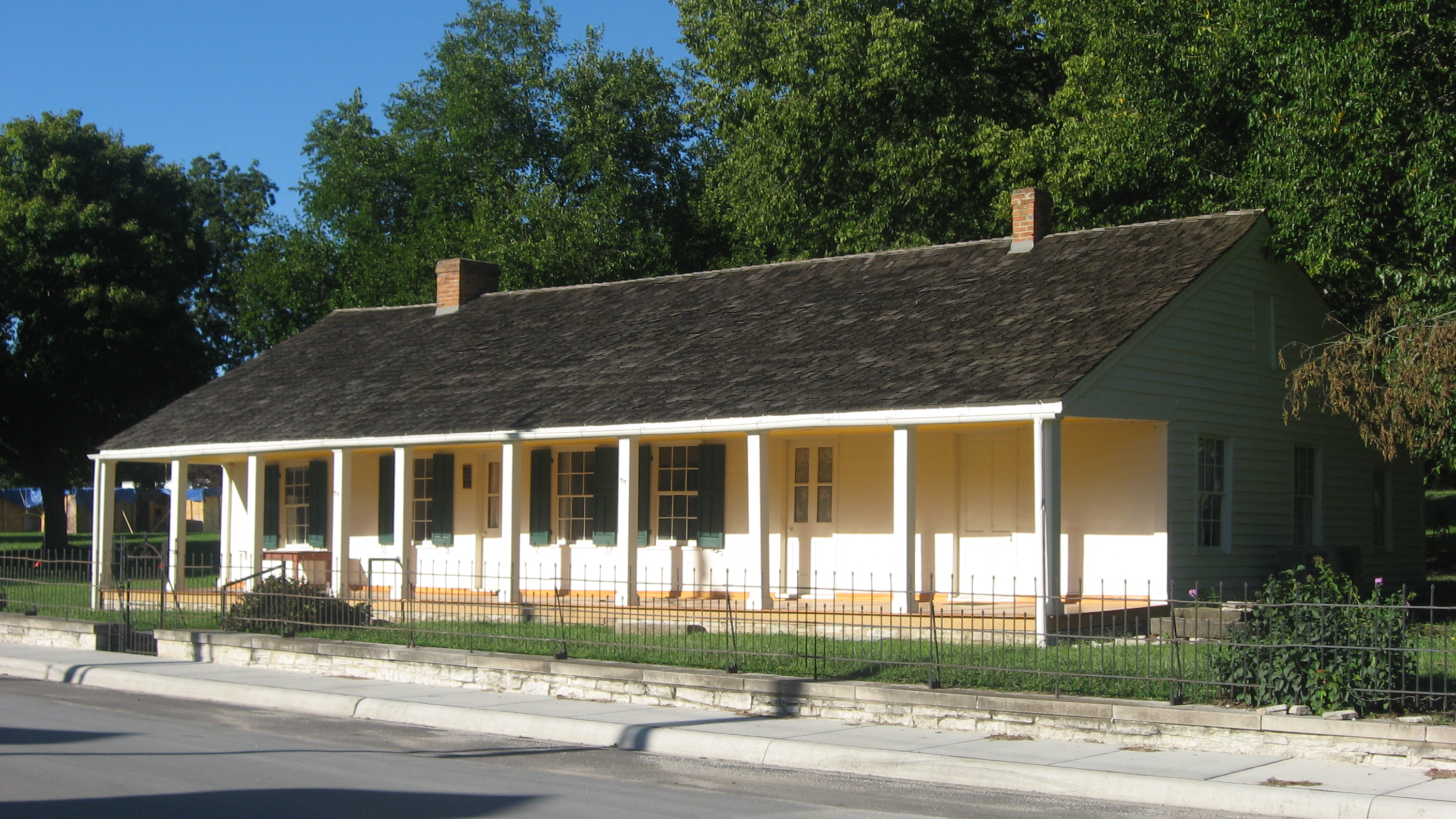
Hansbrough's birthplace

Henry Clay Hansbrough was born in the historic Creole House in the village of Prairie du Rocher, Illinois. Henry Clay, who attended the wedding for his parents Elisha Hansbrough and Sarah Hagan, suggested to them that they name their first son after him, and they did. Henry attended the common schools, but his school was interrupted by the Civil War and was forced to close.

In 1867, the family moved to San Jose, California. He learned the art of printing and worked at the trade in San Jose and later at Baraboo, Wisconsin. He was employed at one time at the San Jose Daily Independent and the San Francisco Chronicle.

Hansbrough later moved to Dakota Territory and established the Grand Forks News in 1881 and the Inter-Ocean at Devils Lake in 1883.

== Politics ==
Hansbrough was a strong advocate for dividing Dakota Territory and admitted the two halves as separate states into the Union, which eventually happened on November 2, 1889.

He arrived in Creel City, North Dakota (later renamed to Devils Lake), and was soon named postmaster, replacing Heber M. Creel, who was the settler and founder of Devils Lake. This created a rivalry between Creel and Hansbrough. The two owned rival newspapers. Hansbrough owned the Devils Lake Inter-Ocean and Creel owned the Devils Lake Pioneer Press. Both men ran for mayor of the city. Hansbrough was elected mayor of Devils Lake in 1885 and served until 1888. He was also a member of the Republican National Committee from 1888 to 1896.

Upon the admission of North Dakota as a state, Hansbrough was elected as a Republican to the Fifty-first Congress. He was the first person to represent the new state of North Dakota in the House of Representatives. He served from November 2, 1889, until March 3, 1891. He did not seek renomination in 1891, having become a candidate for Senator.

Hansbrough was elected to the U.S. Senate in 1891 and reelected in 1897 and again in 1903 and served from March 4, 1891, to March 3, 1909. He was an unsuccessful candidate for reelection in 1909. While in the Senate, he was chairman of the Committee on the Library (Fifty-fourth Congress) and a member of the Committee on Public Lands (Fifty-fifth through Sixtieth Congresses) and the Committee on Agriculture and Forestry (Sixtieth Congress).

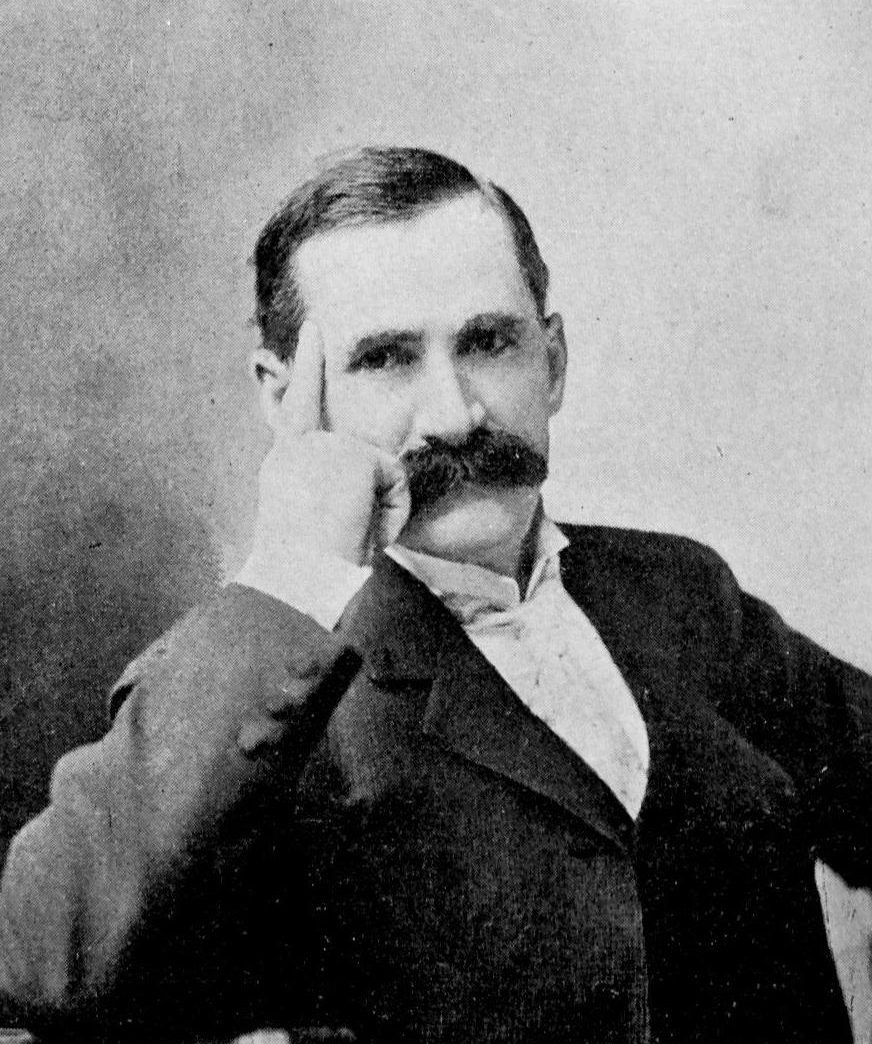
Portrait of Senator Henry C. Hansbrough, circa 1898

As a Republican in D.C., Hansbrough became friends with Theodore Roosevelt, another prominent member of the party. Even though Hansbrough was a Republican, he was still a "maverick," and later he would announce his support of Democratic Woodrow Wilson. In 1928, he supported the Democratic candidate, Alfred E. Smith, over the Republican candidate, Herbert Hoover. Before his death in 1933, Hansbrough was also a supporter of President Franklin Roosevelt's farm programs during the Great Depression.

Hansbrough resumed his former business pursuits in Devils Lake following his unsuccessful reelection and moved to Florida, New York, and finally to Washington, D.C., in 1927, where he died in 1933.

== Death ==
In 1933, Hansbrough visited his friend U.S. Senator Gerald Nye. Hansbrough requested Nye, upon his death, to scatter his ashes under an elm tree on the United States Capitol Grounds in Washington, D.C. Although it was not allowed, Nye fulfilled his friend’s request after he died, making Hansbrough the only person to have a final resting place on Capitol Hill.

== Notes ==
U.S. House of Representatives
New constituency	Member of the U.S. House of Representatives from North Dakota's at-large congressional district 1889–1891	Succeeded by Martin N. Johnson
U.S. Senate
Preceded by Gilbert A. Pierce	U.S. Senator (Class 3) from North Dakota; 1891–1909; Served alongside: Lyman R. Casey, William N. Roach, Porter J. McCumber	Succeeded by Martin N. Johnson
Honorary titles
Preceded by Adelbert Ames	Most senior living U.S. senator (Sitting or former); April 12, 1933 – November 16, 1933	Succeeded by Lee Mantle
