= Asle Gronna =

American politician (1858–1922)

Asle Jorgenson Gronna
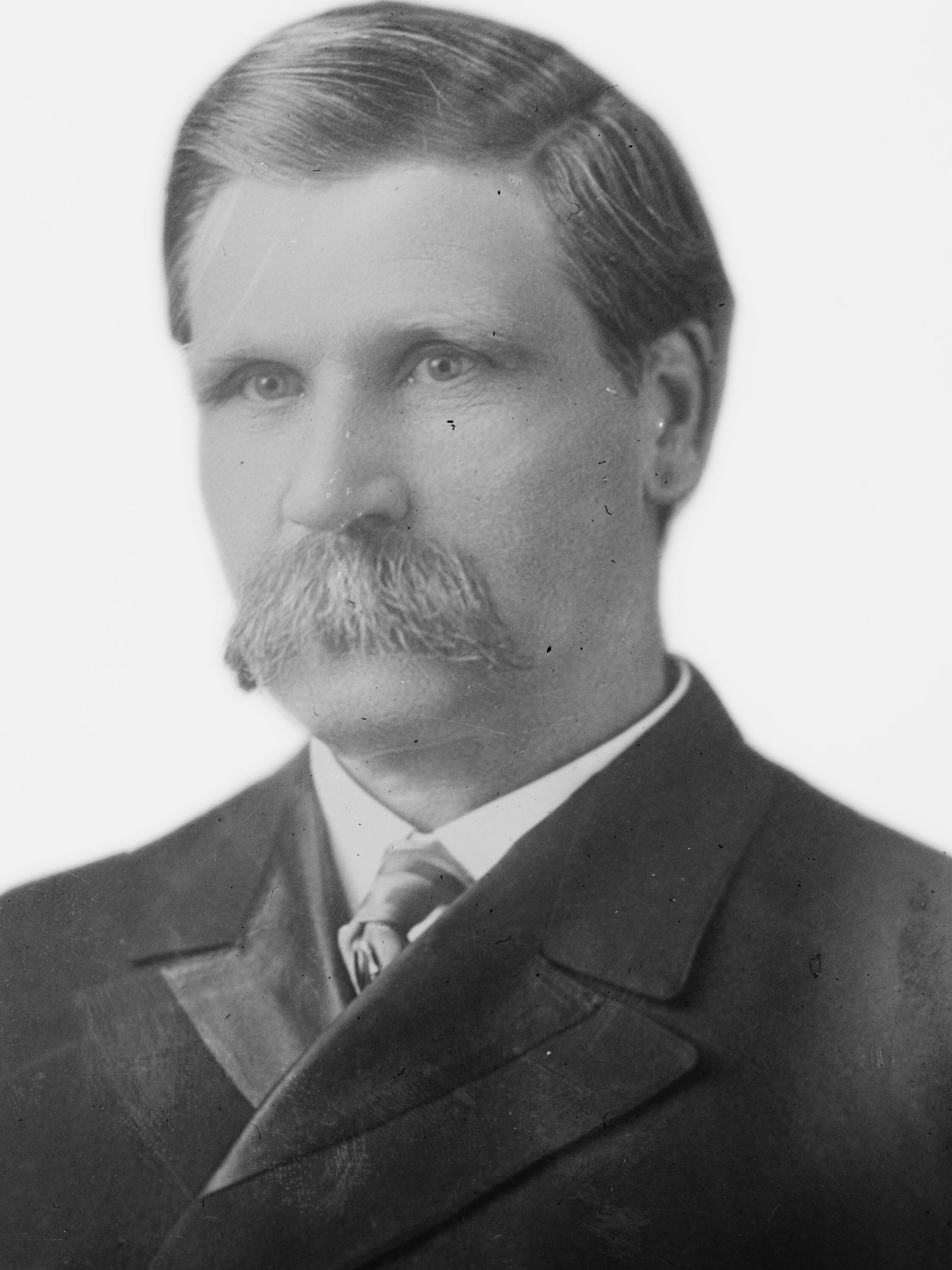

United States Senator from North Dakota
- In office February 2, 1911 – March 3, 1921
- Preceded by: William E. Purcell
- Succeeded by: Edwin F. Ladd

Member of the U.S. House of Representatives from North Dakota's at-large district
- In office March 4, 1905 – February 2, 1911
- Preceded by: Burleigh F. Spalding
- Succeeded by: Henry T. Helgesen

Personal details
- Born: December 10, 1858 Elkader, Iowa, US
- Died: May 4, 1922 (aged 63) Lakota, North Dakota, US
- Party: Republican

Asle Jorgenson Gronna (December 10, 1858 – May 4, 1922) was an American politician who served in the House of Representatives and Senate from North Dakota. He was one of six senators to vote against the United States declaration of war leading to the First World War.

== Biography ==
Gronna was born in Elkader, Clayton County, Iowa, of Norwegian ancestry, and was raised in Houston County, Minnesota. He attended the public schools of Houston County and Caledonia Academy. After graduating, he obtained his qualification as a school teacher and taught in Wilmington, Minnesota.

In 1879, Gronna moved to the Dakota Territory, where he farmed, taught school, and was active in several business ventures. He served as president of Lakota, North Dakota's village and president of Lakota's board of education. A Republican, he was elected to the Dakota Territorial House of Representatives in 1889.

Gronna was a successful Republican candidate for the United States House of Representatives in 1904. He was reelected in 1906 and 1908, and served in the 59th, 60th, and 61st Congresses. In 1911 he was elected to the United States Senate, filling the vacancy caused by the death of Martin N. Johnson. Gronna was re-elected in 1914 and served in the 62nd through 65th Congresses. He was an unsuccessful candidate for reelection in 1920 and left office on March 3, 1921.

In Congress, Gronna earned the reputation of a Republican who reflected the attitudes of his region - progressive and isolationist. He blamed munition makers for the preparedness movement and World War I and was part of the "little group of willful men," who opposed President Woodrow Wilson. In 1919 he was a staunch isolationist who opposed the League of Nations treaty because it further entangled the United States in foreign relationships and limited national decision making.

== Personal life ==
He and his wife Bertha were the parents of five children, including James D. Gronna who served as Secretary of State of North Dakota, and Arthur J. Gronna who was North Dakota Attorney General. Asle Gronna died on May 4, 1922.

Party political offices
First	Republican nominee for U.S. Senator from North Dakota (Class 3); 1914	Succeeded by Edwin F. Ladd
U.S. House of Representatives
Preceded by Burleigh F. Spalding	Member of the U.S. House of Representatives from North Dakota's at-large congressional district March 4, 1905 – February 2, 1911	Succeeded by Henry Thomas Helgesen
U.S. Senate
Preceded by William E. Purcell	U.S. senator (Class 3) from North Dakota; February 2, 1911 – March 3, 1921; Served alongside: Porter J. McCumber	Succeeded by Edwin Ladd
