= William E. Purcell =

American politician

William Edward Purcell
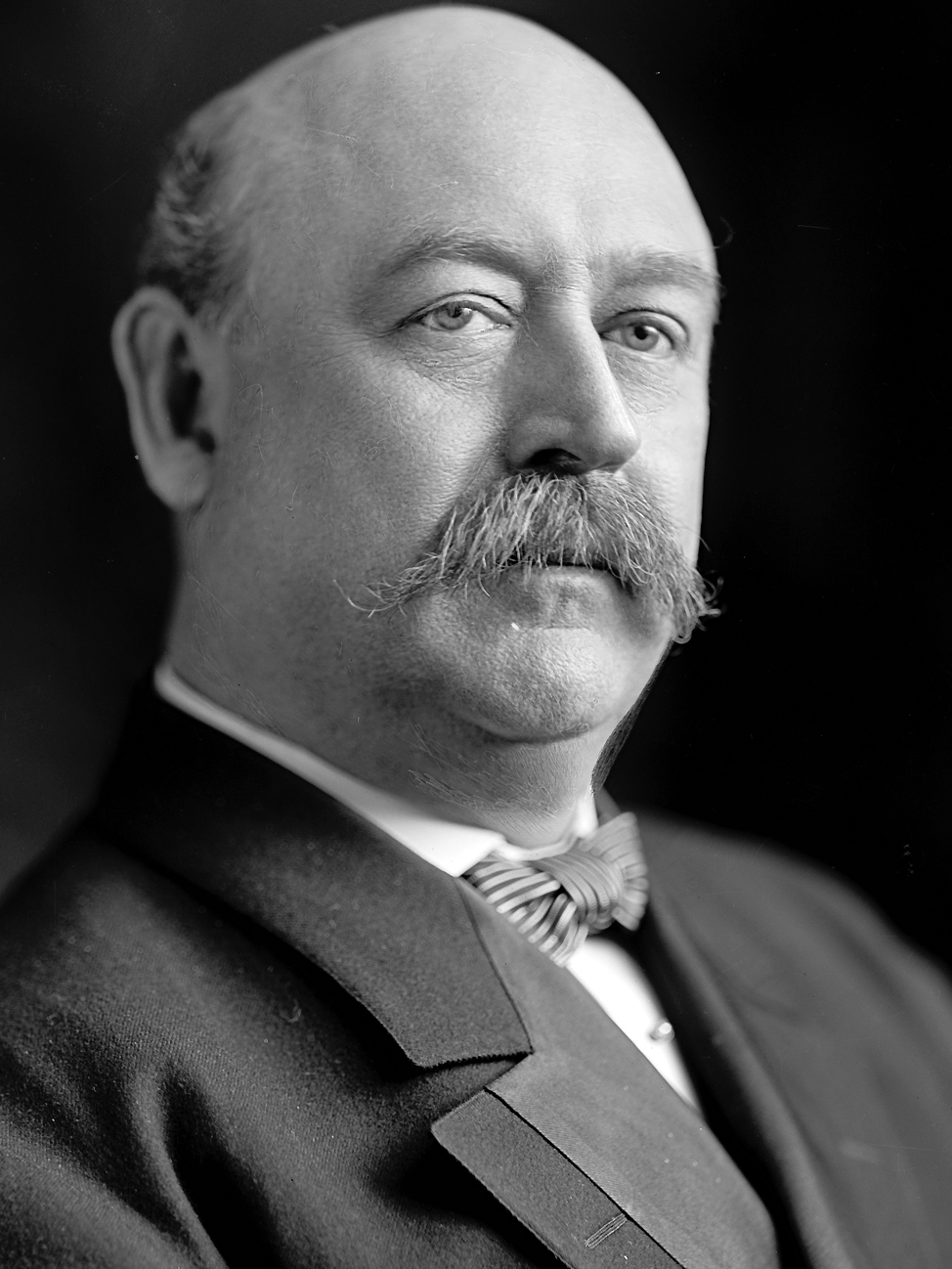

United States Senator from North Dakota
- In office February 1, 1910 – February 1, 1911
- Appointed by: John Burke
- Preceded by: Fountain L. Thompson
- Succeeded by: Asle Gronna

Member of the North Dakota Senate
- In office 1907–1909

District attorney of Richland County, North Dakota
- In office 1889–1891

Personal details
- Born: August 3, 1856 Flemington, New Jersey
- Died: November 23, 1928 (aged 72) Wahpeton, North Dakota
- Party: Democratic

William Edward Purcell (August 3, 1856 – November 23, 1928) was a United States senator from North Dakota. Born in Flemington, New Jersey, he attended the common schools, studied law, and was admitted to the bar of New Jersey in 1880, commencing practice in Flemington. He moved to Wahpeton, Dakota Territory, in 1881 and continued the practice of law; in 1888 he was appointed by President Grover Cleveland as United States attorney for the Territory of Dakota. He resigned in 1889, having been elected a member of the constitutional convention for the new State of North Dakota. From 1889 to 1891 he was district attorney of Richland County, North Dakota and was a member of the North Dakota Senate from 1907 to 1909.

Purcell was appointed as a Democrat to the U.S. Senate to fill the vacancy caused by the death of Martin N. Johnson and the resignation of Fountain L. Thompson, and served from February 1, 1910, to February 1, 1911, when a successor was elected and qualified; he was an unsuccessful candidate for election, and continued the practice of law until his death. In 1917, he was appointed chairman of the Food Conservation Commission. Purcell died in 1928, and interment was in Calvary Cemetery in Wahpeton.

Party political offices
First	Democratic nominee for U.S. Senator from North Dakota (Class 3); 1914	Succeeded by H. H. Perry
U.S. Senate
Preceded by Fountain L. Thompson	U.S. senator (Class 3) from North Dakota; 1910 – 1911; Served alongside: Porter J. McCumber	Succeeded by Asle J. Gronna
