= 1914 United States Senate election in North Dakota =

- November 3, 1914
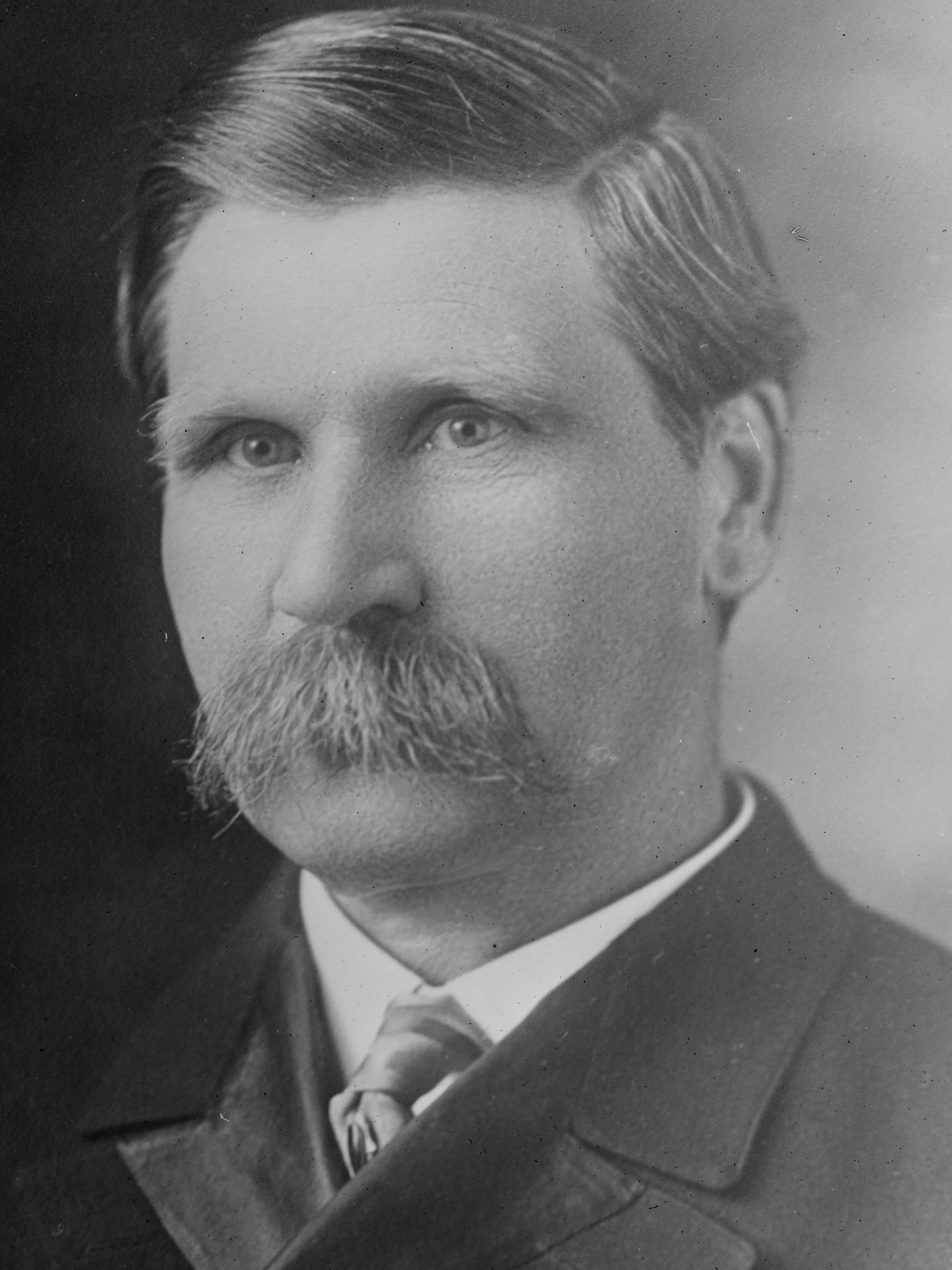

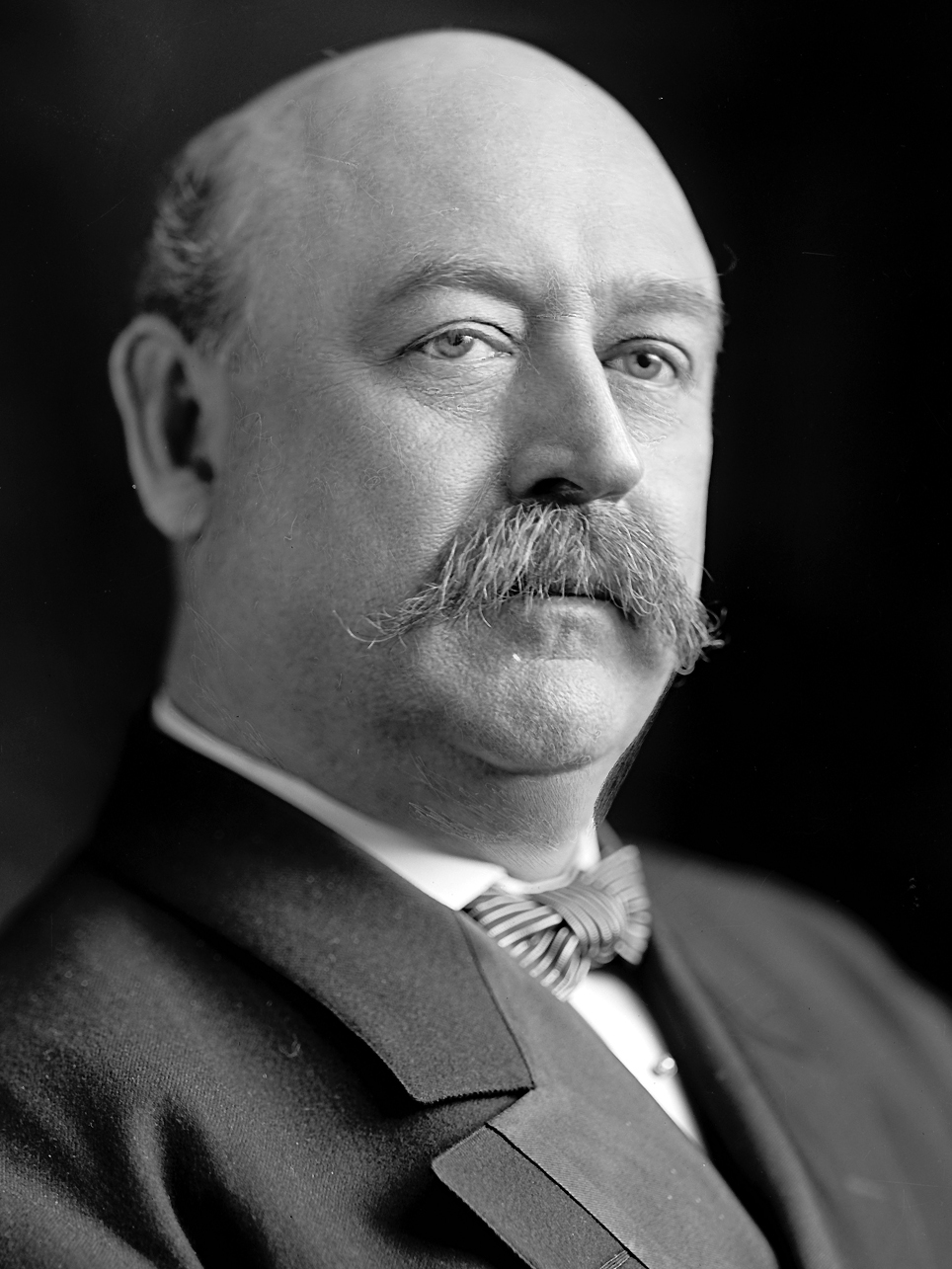

| Nominee | Asle Gronna | William E. Purcell | W. H. Brown |
| Party | Republican | Democratic | Socialist |
| Popular vote | 48,732 | 29,640 | 6,231 |
| Percentage | 55.81% | 33.95% | 7.14% |
- County results Gronna: 40–50% 50–60% 60–70% 70–80% Purcell: 50–60% No Vote
U.S. senator before election
Asle Gronna
Republican
Elected U.S. Senator
Asle Gronna
Republican

The 1914 United States Senate election in North Dakota took place on November 3, 1914. Incumbent Senator Asle Gronna, a Republican, sought re-election in his first popular election. Against several strong challengers, he won the Republican primary, though only with a plurality. In the general election, he faced former U.S. Senator William E. Purcell, the Democratic nominee. Gronna ultimately had little difficulty defeating Purcell to win re-election.

== Democratic primary ==
=== Candidates ===
- William E. Purcell, former U.S. Senator
- George P. Jones, former LaMoure County State's Attorney, 1912 Democratic candidate for Governor

=== Results ===
Democratic primary
| Party | Candidate | Votes | % |
|---|---|---|---|
| Democratic | William E. Purcell | 6,609 | 51.60% |
| Democratic | George P. Jones | 6,200 | 48.40% |
| Total votes | | 12,809 | 100.00% |

== Republican primary ==
=== Candidates ===
- Asle Gronna, incumbent U.S. Senator
- John W. Worst, President of North Dakota Agricultural College
- Andrew Miller, Attorney General of North Dakota
- Herman N. Midtbo, perennial candidate

=== Results ===
Republican primary
| Party | Candidate | Votes | % |
|---|---|---|---|
| Republican | Asle Gronna (inc.) | 27,740 | 47.60% |
| Republican | John W. Worst | 14,639 | 25.12% |
| Republican | Andrew Miller | 13,588 | 23.32% |
| Republican | Herman N. Midtbo | 2,305 | 3.96% |
| Total votes | | 58,272 | 100.00% |

== General election ==
=== Results ===
1914 United States Senate election in North Dakota
| Party | Candidate | Votes | % |
|---|---|---|---|
| Republican | Asle Gronna (inc.) | 48,732 | 55.81% |
| Democratic | William E. Purcell | 29,640 | 33.95% |
| Socialist | W. H. Brown | 6,231 | 7.14% |
| Independent | Sever Serumgard | 2,707 | 3.10% |
| Majority | | 19,092 | 21.87% |
| Total votes | | 87,310 | 100.00% |
| Republican hold | | | |
