= Porter J. McCumber =

American politician (1858–1933)

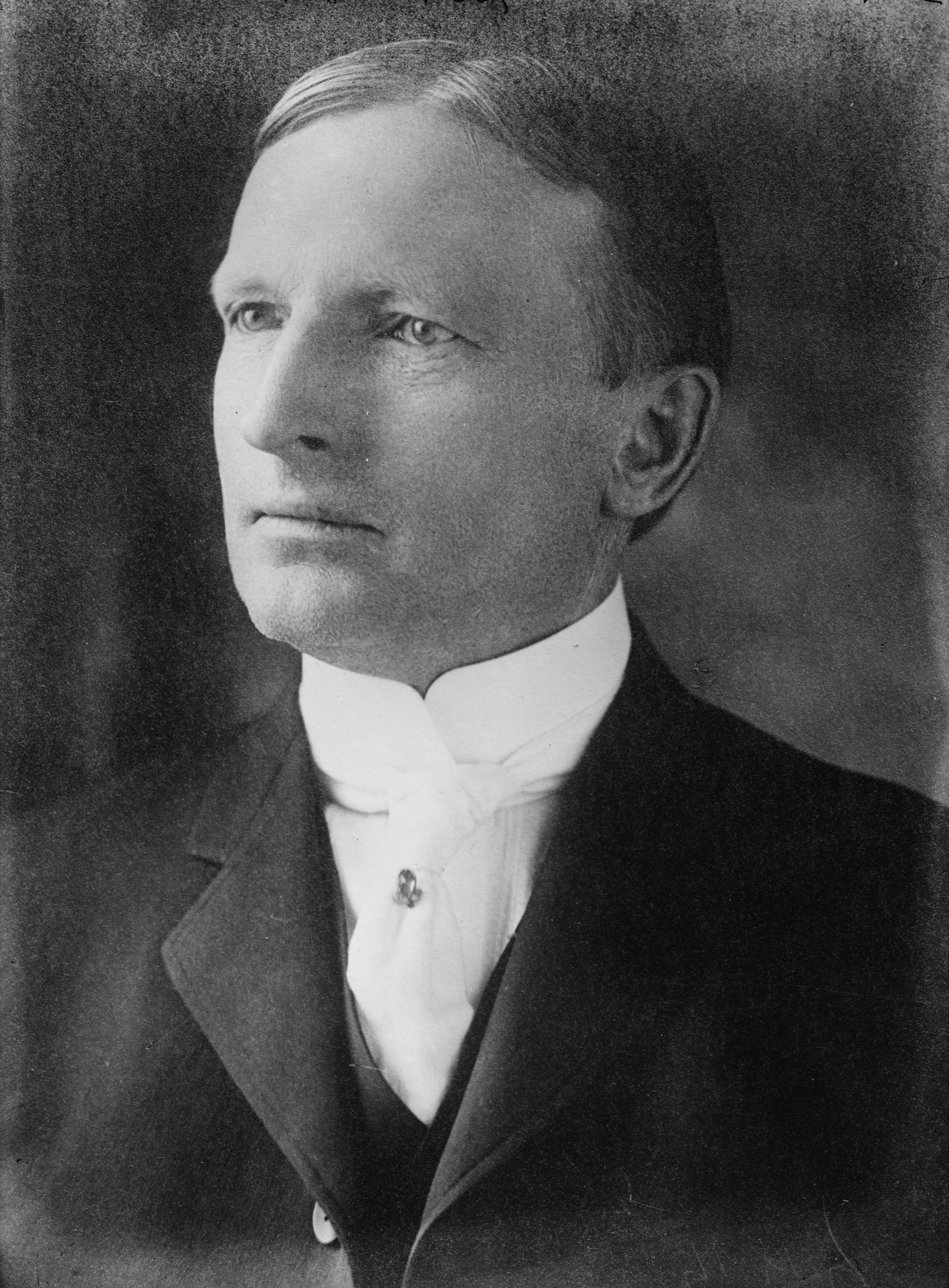
- McCumber, c. 1915–1920

United States Senator from North Dakota
- In office March 4, 1899 – March 3, 1923
- Preceded by: William N. Roach
- Succeeded by: Lynn Frazier

Personal details
- Born: Porter James McCumber; February 3, 1858 Crete, Illinois, U.S.
- Died: May 18, 1933 (aged 75) Washington, D.C., U.S.
- Resting place: Columbia Gardens Cemetery; Arlington, Virginia, U.S.
- Party: Republican
- Spouse: Jennie M. Schorning (m. 1889)
- Children: 2
- Education: University of Michigan Law School
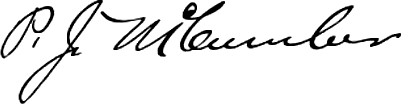
- Signature

Porter James McCumber (February 3, 1858 – May 18, 1933) was a United States senator from North Dakota. He was a supporter of the 1906 Pure Food and Drug Act and of the League of Nations.

== Early life ==
Born in Crete, Illinois in 1858, he moved with his parents to a farm in Rochester, Minnesota, later that year. He attended the common schools and taught school for a few years. He graduated from the law department of the University of Michigan at Ann Arbor in 1880. He was admitted to the bar and began his practice at Wahpeton, Dakota Territory, in 1881.

In his youth, he reportedly worked as a grain stacker on the farm of George Worner, near Great Bend. Worner was one of the town's founders and served in the county government.

McCumber married Jennie M. Schorning of Wahpeton on May 29, 1889. By 1899, they had two children.

== Political career ==
McCumber, a staunch Republican, was elected to the territorial House of Representatives in 1884 and the territorial Senate in 1886. He served as the state attorney of Richland County from 1889 to 1891.

== McCumber Agreement ==
In an effort to resolve disputes over hunting territory, in 1858 the Ojibwe and Dakotas, with the assistance of U.S. negotiators, agreed to the "Sweet Corn Treaty", defining their respective lands. The Ojibwe lands were about 11,000,000 acres. The Dakota Territory became an organized territory on March 2, 1861. Two years later, the federal government, pressured by people who wished to settle there, entered into negotiations with the Pembina and the Red Lake Ojibwe. One of the representatives of the Pembina Ojibwe, who lived west of the Red River, was Little Shell. The U.S. Government asked the Ojibwe to cede about nine million acres. In 1863, the United States signed The Old Crossing Treaty with the Red Lake and Pembina Bands of Chippewa who ceded several thousand acres of Indian lands near the Red River of the North to the United States government in exchange for a nominal amount of money to be paid to the Ojibwe. Chief Little Shell signed for the Pembina band. By 1875, the Government had compelled a substantial part of the Pembinas, on threat of loss of their annuities from the 1863 cession, to move from the unceded portion to the White Earth reservation in Minnesota. The rest remained in the area of Turtle Mountain.

In 1882, the Turtle Mountain Reservation of about 460,000 acres was established. Two years later, the area was reduced to about 46,000 acres. The federal government did not include in its calculations those Ojibwe who periodically crossed over to Canada for hunting, nor the Metis, the offspring of an Ojibwe mother and an English or French fur trader. The reservation was entirely too small.

By 1892 McCumber was a federal commissioner. He and others met with Chief Little Shell who wanted to retain more land than acceptable to the commission, and refused to accept the terms, including the government's offer of 10 cents an acre for 10 million acres of prime farming land. He walked out of the negotiations in protest and never signed the subsequent McCumber Agreement. His people were left out of the settlement. Negotiations continued with a Council of 32" selected by the local federal agent, John Waugh. Although Little Shell traveled to Washington, D.C. to file a protest in Washington regarding the negotiations, the McCumber Agreement was accepted by Congress in 1904. The Turtle Mountain Band of Chippewas received $1,000,000 for the 9,000,000 acres they ceded.

== Senator ==
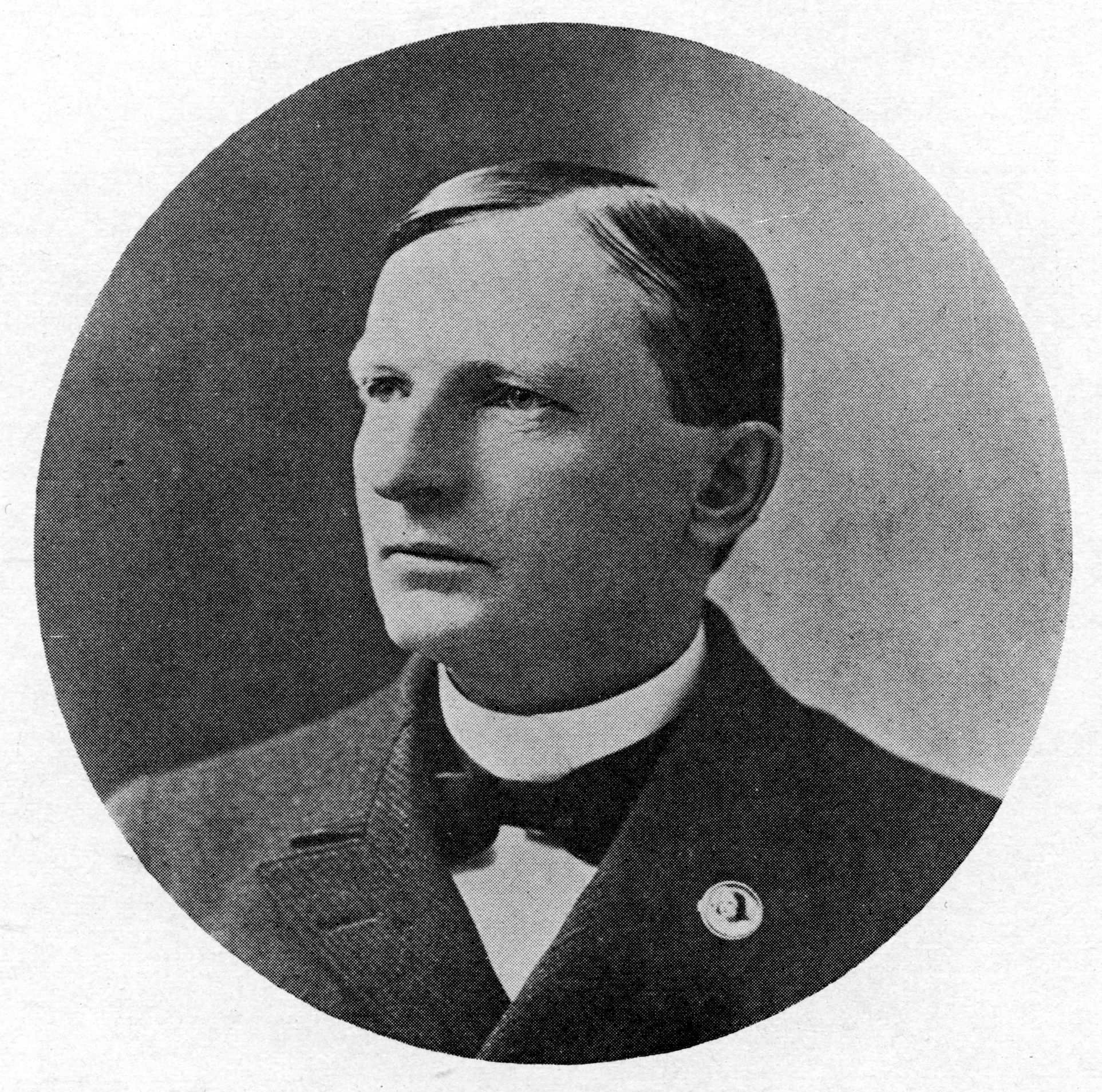
Porter J. McCumber, U.S. Senator from North Dakota

McCumber was elected to the US Senate in 1899. McCumber was re-elected in 1905, 1911, and 1916 and served from March 4, 1899, to March 3, 1923. He was an unsuccessful candidate for renomination in 1922, having been defeated in the Republican primary by former governor Lynn Frazier.

In the Senate, he was chairman of the Committee on Manufactures (Fifty-seventh Congress) and a member of the Committee on Pensions (Fifty-eighth to Sixty-second and Sixty-sixth and Sixty-seventh Congresses), the Committee on Indian Affairs (Fifty-ninth Congress), the Committee on Transportation Routes to the Seaboard (Sixty-third to Sixty-fifth Congresses), and the Committee on Finance (Sixty-seventh Congress). In 1905, McCumber was an ardent advocate of a pure food law. One of his main legislative accomplishments was the Fordney–McCumber Tariff Act of 1922.

In his position on the Pension Committee, he was part of the interrogation of Colonel W.S. Metcalfe on the alleged shooting of unarmed prisoners during the Philippine–American War, at the Battle of Caloocan, on February 10, 1899. Brigadier General Frederick Funston was accused of interfering with an investigation into the alleged shooting. Metcalfe denied the charges.

McCumber was Woodrow Wilson's staunchest Republican supporter in the Senate for the League of Nations.

== Later life ==
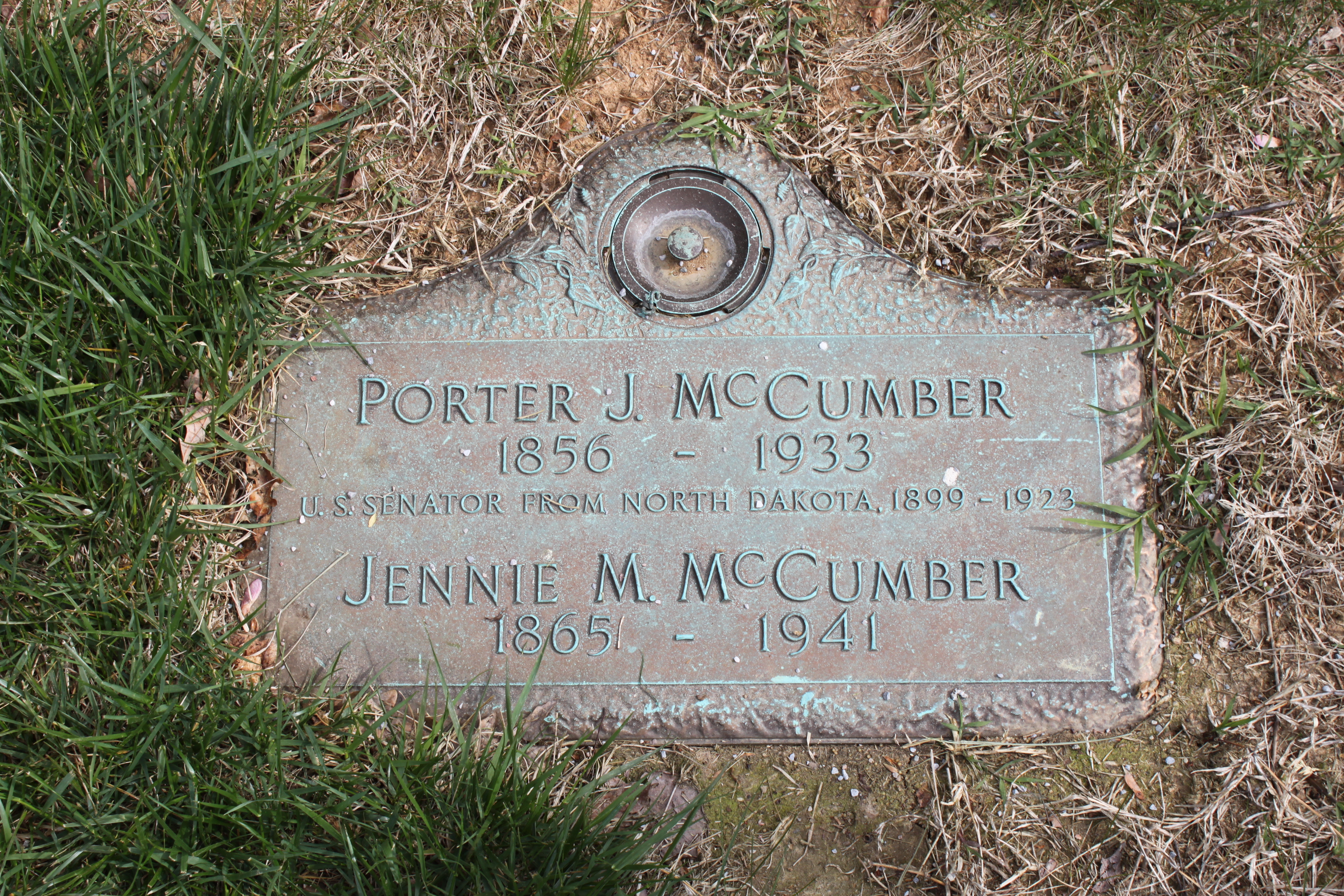
Grave of McCumber and his wife at Columbia Gardens Cemetery

McCumber resumed the practice of law in Washington, D.C., and was appointed by President Calvin Coolidge in 1925 as a member of the International Joint Commission to pass upon all cases involving the use of the boundary waters between the United States and Canada. He served in that capacity until his death in Washington, DC, in 1933. His first interment was in Abbey Mausoleum, adjoining Arlington National Cemetery. His remains were removed and reinterred at Columbia Gardens Cemetery, in Arlington, Virginia.

== Sources ==
- United States Congress. "Porter J. McCumber (id: M000397)". Biographical Directory of the United States Congress.

Party political offices
First	Republican nominee for U.S. Senator from North Dakota (Class 1); 1916	Succeeded by Lynn Frazier
U.S. Senate
Preceded by William N. Roach	U.S. senator (Class 1) from North Dakota; 1899 – 1923; Served alongside: Henry C. Hansbrough, Martin N. Johnson, Fountain L. Thompson, William E. Purcell, Asle Gronna, Edwin F. Ladd	Succeeded by Lynn Frazier
Political offices
Preceded by Boies Penrose	Chairman of the U.S. Senate Committee on Finance; 1922 – 1923	Succeeded by Reed Smoot
