= Fountain L. Thompson =

American politician

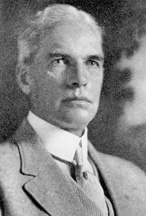

United States Senator from North Dakota
- In office November 10, 1909 – January 31, 1910
- Appointed by: John Burke
- Preceded by: Martin N. Johnson
- Succeeded by: William E. Purcell

Personal details
- Born: November 18, 1854 Macoupin County, Illinois, U.S.
- Died: February 4, 1942 (aged 87) Los Angeles, California, U.S.
- Party: Democratic
- Profession: Lawyer

Fountain Land Thompson (November 18, 1854 – February 4, 1942) was a North Dakota politician who served as a United States senator from his state.

== Biography ==
Born in Macoupin County, Illinois near Scottville, he moved to nearby Girard in 1865; he attended the public schools there and studied law and was admitted to the bar, but did not engage in extensive practice. He was a member of the board of supervisors of Macoupin County and engaged in mercantile pursuits. He moved to Dakota Territory and settled on a farm near Cando, North Dakota, in 1888. He was judge of the Towner County Court from 1890 to 1894. He engaged in the real estate business and banking in Cando and also in agricultural pursuits; was a school director and member of the Cando Board of Aldermen. He was mayor of Cando, and was appointed as a Democrat to the U.S. Senate to fill the vacancy caused by the death of Martin N. Johnson and served from November 10, 1909, to January 31, 1910, when he resigned.

He resumed his former business activities in Cando until his retirement in 1921; he moved to Los Angeles, California where he resided until his death in 1942 at age 87. He is only the second U.S. senator to have ever held the record of oldest living U.S. senator for two distinct intervals. This was due to the late age inauguration and subsequent passing 2 months later of Andrew Jackson Houston. Thompson's interment was in Hollywood Cemetery.

U.S. Senate
Preceded by Martin Johnson	U.S. senator (Class 3) from North Dakota; November 10, 1909-January 31, 1910; Served alongside: Porter J. McCumber	Succeeded by William Purcell
Honorary titles
Preceded by Furnifold Simmons	Oldest living U.S. senator April 30, 1940 – April 21, 1941	Succeeded by Andrew Houston
Preceded by Andrew Houston	Oldest living U.S. senator June 26, 1941 – February 4, 1942	Succeeded by Robert Owen
