= F. M. Simmons =

American politician (1854–1940)

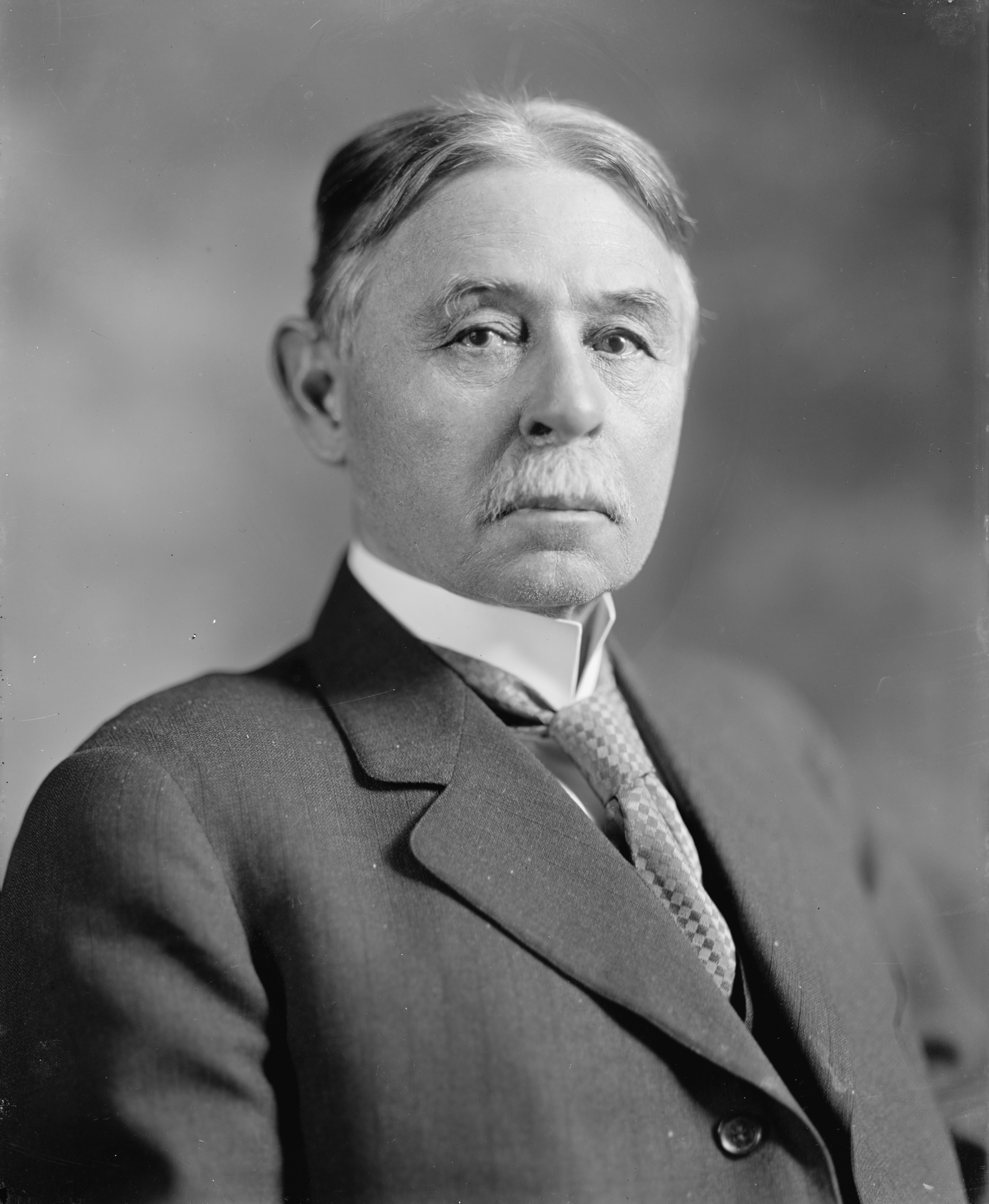
- Simmons, 1905–1940

United States Senator from North Carolina
- In office March 4, 1901 – March 3, 1931
- Preceded by: Marion Butler
- Succeeded by: Josiah Bailey

Member of the U.S. House of Representatives from North Carolina's 2nd district
- In office March 4, 1887 – March 3, 1889
- Preceded by: James E. O'Hara
- Succeeded by: Henry P. Cheatham

Personal details
- Born: January 20, 1854 Pollocksville, North Carolina
- Died: April 30, 1940 (aged 86) New Bern, North Carolina
- Party: Democratic

Furnifold McLendel Simmons (January 20, 1854 – April 30, 1940) was an American politician who served as a Democratic member of the United States House of Representatives from March 4, 1887, to March 4, 1889, and U.S. senator from the state of North Carolina between March 4, 1901, and March 4, 1931. He served as chairman of the powerful Committee on Finance from March 4, 1913, to March 4, 1919. He was an unsuccessful contender for the 1920 Democratic Party nomination for president. Simmons was a staunch segregationist and white supremacist, and a leading perpetrator of the Wilmington massacre.

== Life and career ==
Simmons was born in Pollocksville, North Carolina, the son of Mary McLendel (Jerman) and Furnifold Greene Simmons. After Republicans won control of the North Carolina legislature in 1894, Simmons led efforts to disenfranchise black voters and return Democrats to power across the state. He allied with white supremacist newspapers to stoke fears of black men as predators of white women and too incompetent to be trusted as office holders or voters. Simmons also set up hundreds of "White Government Unions," which aimed to "announce on all occasions that they would succeed if they had to shoot every negro in the city." As a result, Democrats swept the 1898 election, and the Wilmington massacre broke out the following day.

In 1901 Simmons won the Democratic nomination for the US Senate. From his Senate seat, he then ran a powerful political machine, using A. D. Watts "to keep the machine oiled back home," in the words of one journalist. Simmons remained in office for the next thirty years.

Senator Simmons refused to endorse Al Smith, the Democratic nominee for president in 1928 and the first Catholic nominated by a major party, winning him praise from members of the Ku Klux Klan. Still, rejecting the Democratic nominee in 1928, together with the Great Depression, led to Simmons being defeated in the 1930 Democratic primary by Josiah W. Bailey, who was backed by Governor O. Max Gardner.

Simmons died on April 30, 1940. He is the last U.S. Senator to have served during the presidency of William McKinley.

Party political offices
First	Democratic nominee for U.S. Senator from North Carolina (Class 2); 1918, 1924	Succeeded by Josiah Bailey
U.S. House of Representatives
Preceded by James E. O'Hara	Member of the U.S. House of Representatives from North Carolina's 2nd congressional district March 4, 1887 – March 4, 1889	Succeeded by Henry P. Cheatham
U.S. Senate
Preceded by Marion Butler	U.S. senator (Class 2) from North Carolina; March 4, 1901 – March 4, 1931; Served alongside: Jeter Connelly Pritchard, Lee Slater Overman, Cameron A. Morrison	Succeeded by Josiah William Bailey
Political offices
Preceded by Boies Penrose; Pennsylvania	Chairman of the U.S. Senate Committee on Finance; March 4, 1913 – March 4, 1919	Succeeded by Boies Penrose; Pennsylvania
Honorary titles
Preceded by Francis E. Warren	Dean of the United States Senate; November 24, 1929 – March 4, 1931	Succeeded by Reed Smoot
Preceded by Obadiah Gardner	Oldest living U.S. senator July 24, 1938 – April 30, 1940	Succeeded by Fountain L. Thompson
Preceded by Henry Heitfeld	Most senior living U.S. senator (Sitting or former); October 21, 1938 – April 30, 1940	Succeeded by Reed Smoot
