= Reed Smoot =

American politician (1862–1941)

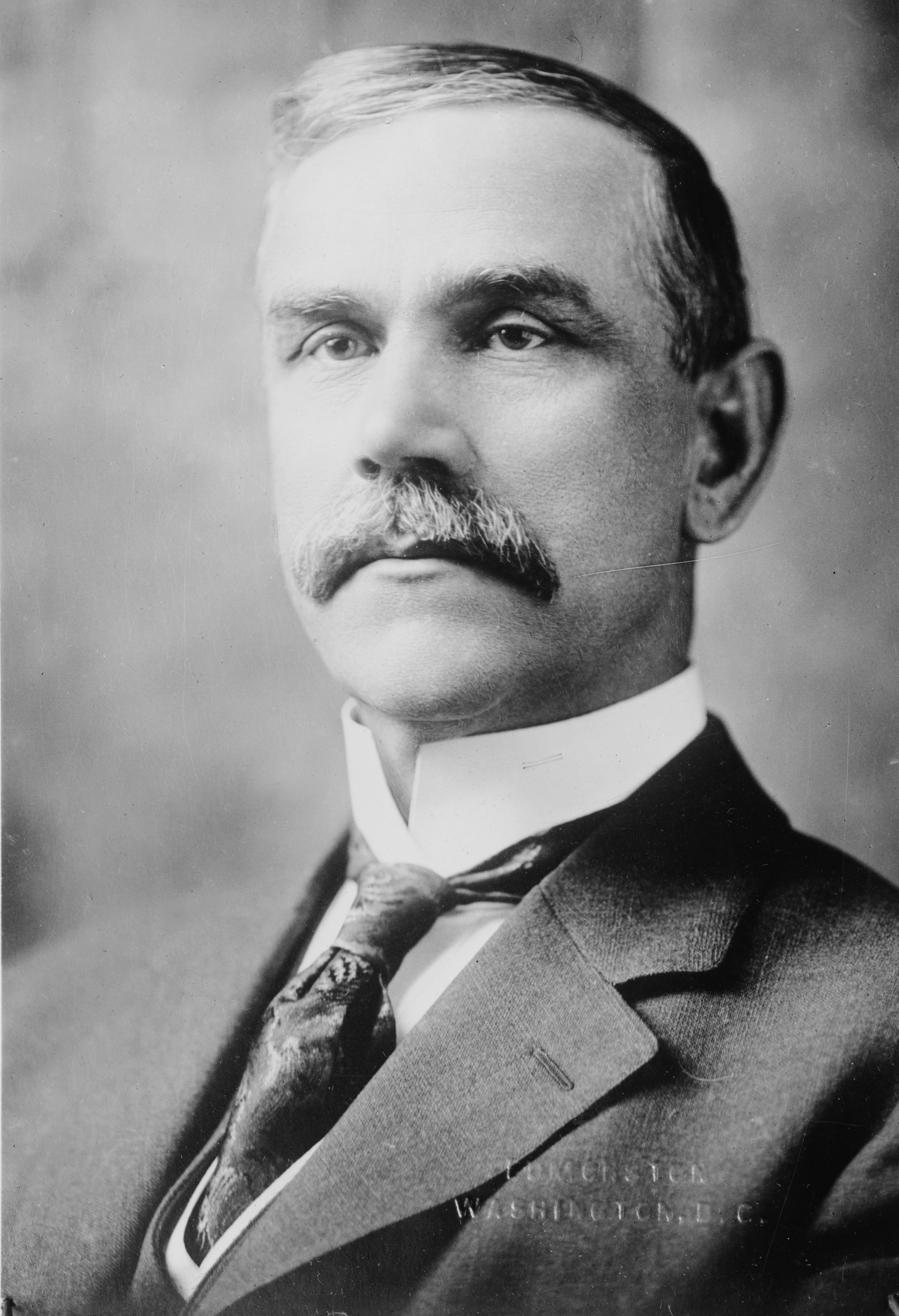
- Smoot c. late 1910s

United States Senator from Utah
- In office March 4, 1903 – March 3, 1933
- Preceded by: Joseph L. Rawlins
- Succeeded by: Elbert D. Thomas
Senate positions
28th Dean of the United States Senate
In office March 4, 1931 – March 3, 1933
Preceded by	F. M. Simmons
Succeeded by	William Borah
Chair of the Senate Finance Committee
In office March 4, 1923 – March 3, 1933
Preceded by	Porter McCumber
Succeeded by	Pat Harrison
Chair of the Senate Public Lands Committee
In office March 4, 1919 – March 3, 1923
Preceded by	Henry Myers
Succeeded by	Irvine Lenroot
In office 1912 – March 3, 1913
Preceded by	Knute Nelson
Succeeded by	George Chamberlain

Personal details
- Born: January 10, 1862 Salt Lake City, Utah Territory
- Died: February 9, 1941 (aged 79) St. Petersburg, Florida, U.S.
- Party: Republican
- Spouse(s): Alpha Eldredge (m. 1884; died 1928) Alice Taylor Sheets (m. 1932)
- Children: 7
- Relatives: Abraham O. Smoot (father)
- Education: University of Utah; Brigham Young Academy
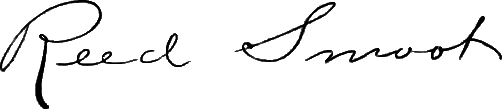
- Signature

Quorum of the Twelve Apostles
- April 8, 1900 – February 9, 1941
- Called by: Lorenzo Snow

LDS Church Apostle
- April 8, 1900 – February 9, 1941
- Called by: Lorenzo Snow
- Reason: Death of Franklin D. Richards
- Reorganization at end of term: Harold B. Lee ordained

Reed Smoot (January 10, 1862 – February 9, 1941) was an American politician, businessman, and apostle of the Church of Jesus Christ of Latter-day Saints (LDS Church). A Republican who was first elected to the U.S. Senate by the Utah State Legislature in 1902, he served from 1903 to 1933. Smoot is primarily remembered as the co-sponsor of the 1930 Smoot–Hawley Tariff Act, which increased almost 900 American import duties. Criticized at the time as having "intensified nationalism all over the world" by Thomas Lamont of J.P. Morgan & Co., Smoot–Hawley is widely regarded as one of the catalysts for the worsening Great Depression.

Smoot was a prominent leader of the LDS Church, called to serve as an apostle and member of the Quorum of the Twelve in 1900. His role in the church, together with rumors of a secret church policy continuing polygamy and a secret oath against the United States, led to a four-year controversy after he was elected to the Senate. A Senate committee investigated his eligibility to serve, known as the Reed Smoot hearings, and recommended against him, but the full Senate voted to seat him.

Smoot continued to be reelected to successive terms until he lost his seat in the 1932 elections. Smoot returned to Utah in 1933. Retiring from politics and business, he devoted himself to the church. At the time of his death, he was third in the line of succession to lead the church.

== Early life, family, and religious activity ==
Smoot was born in Salt Lake City, Utah Territory, on January 10, 1862, the son of Abraham O. Smoot, who served as mayor of the city from 1856 to 1862, and Anne Kristina Morrison Smoot, also known as Anne Kirstine Mauritzen before her marriage. Anne was Abraham Smoot's fifth wife of six plural marriages, and he was the father of 27 children, three of whom he adopted.

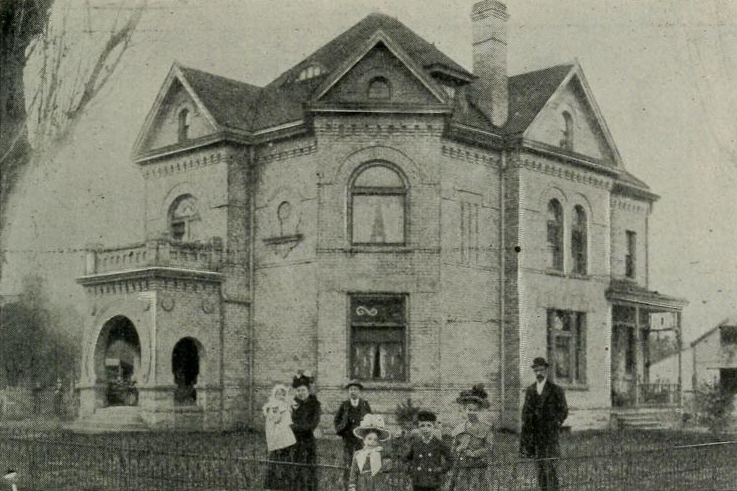
Smoot and his family in front of their home in Provo around 1901

The family moved to Provo, Utah, when Abraham Smoot was called by Brigham Young as the stake president. Smoot attended the University of Utah and graduated from Brigham Young Academy, now Brigham Young University, in 1879. After completing his education, Smoot served as a missionary for the church in England. After returning to Utah, he married Alpha M. Eldredge of Salt Lake City on September 17, 1884. They were the parents of six children. Eldredge died in 1928.

Smoot became a successful businessman in the Provo and Salt Lake City areas, with interests including dry goods stores, mining, banking, railroads, lumberyards, raising livestock, coal sales, and manufacturing woolens. Beginning in 1895, he became increasingly involved in the hierarchy of the LDS Church. On April 8, 1900, he was ordained an apostle and member of the church's Quorum of the Twelve Apostles.

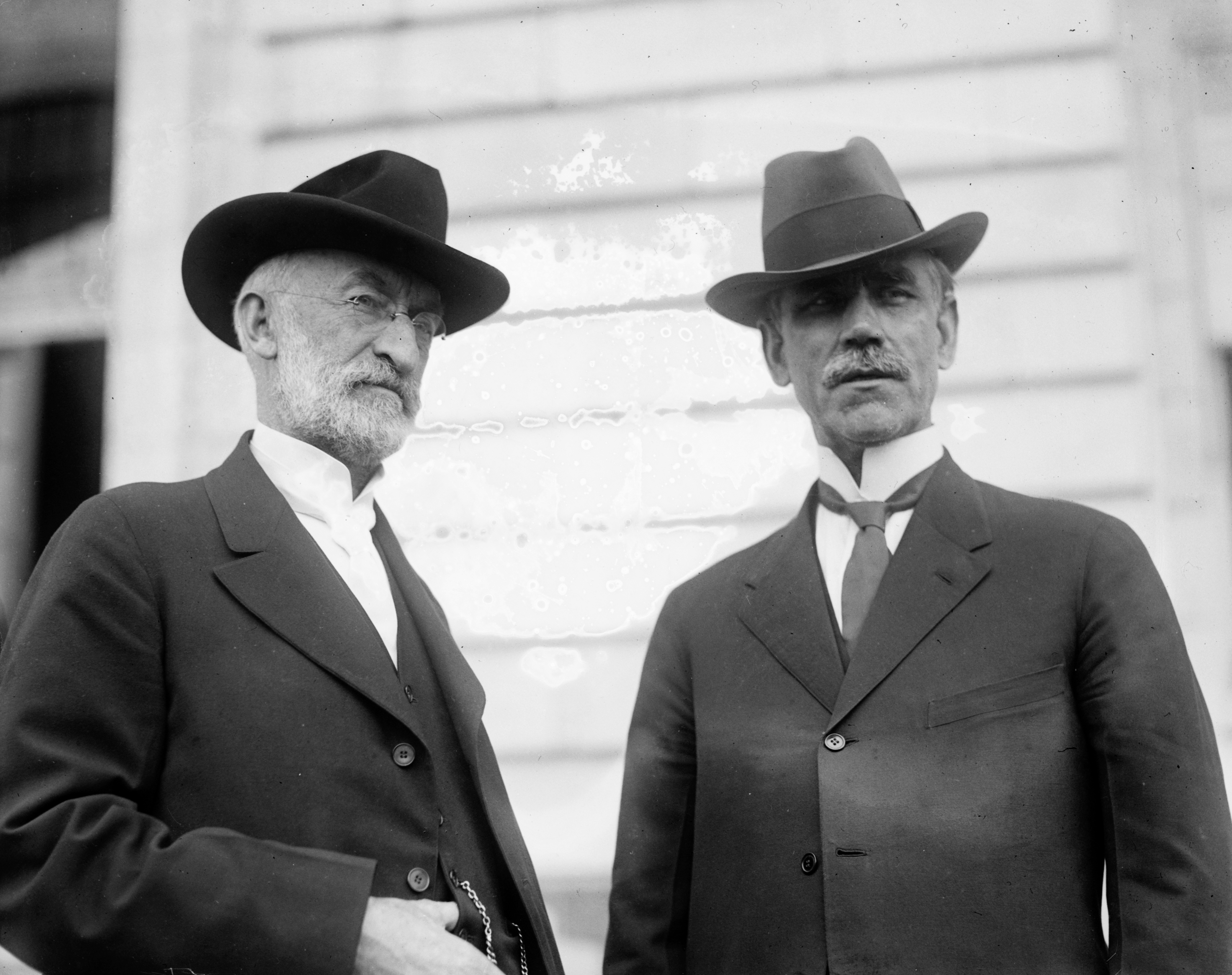
Smoot (right) with Heber J. Grant, president of the LDS Church, c. 1918–1920

== United States Senate ==
Smoot joined the Republican Party and took part in several campaigns beginning in the late 1880s. In February 1892, he was the unsuccessful Republican nominee for mayor of Provo. Beginning in 1892, he was a delegate to several Utah County Republican conventions. He began serving as a member of the state Republican executive committee in the mid-1890s.

After becoming an apostle in 1900, Smoot received the approval of LDS Church president Joseph F. Smith to run for office. In 1901, he ran for the U.S. Senate, and was defeated in the state legislative election by Thomas Kearns. Smoot was elected by the Utah legislature to the United States Senate in the 58th Congress on January 20, 1903. When he took his oath of office, Kearns provided his formal introduction to the senate.

=== Controversy over religious affiliation ===
Smoot's election sparked a bitter four-year battle in the Senate on whether Smoot was eligible and should be allowed to serve. Many Americans were suspicious of the LDS Church because of its earlier polygamous practices. In addition, some senators thought Smoot's position as an apostle would disqualify him from representing all his constituents. Many were convinced that his association with the church disqualified him from serving in the United States Senate. Only a few years earlier, another prominent Utah Latter-day Saint, B. H. Roberts, had been elected to the House of Representatives. He was denied his seat on the basis that he practiced plural marriage (polygamy), which was illegal in Utah as well as all other states of the Union.

The LDS Church had officially renounced future plural marriages in an 1890 Manifesto, before Utah was admitted as a state. However, the Salt Lake Tribune reported that church leaders continued to approve secretly of new, post-Manifesto plural marriages. Because of the controversy, the Senate began an investigation into Smoot's eligibility. The Smoot Hearings began on January 16, 1904. The hearings included exhaustive questioning into the continuation of plural marriage within the state of Utah and the LDS Church, and questions on church teachings, doctrines, and history. Although Smoot was not a polygamist, the charge by those opposed to his election to the Senate was that he could not swear to uphold the United States Constitution while serving in the highest echelons of an organization that sanctioned law breaking.

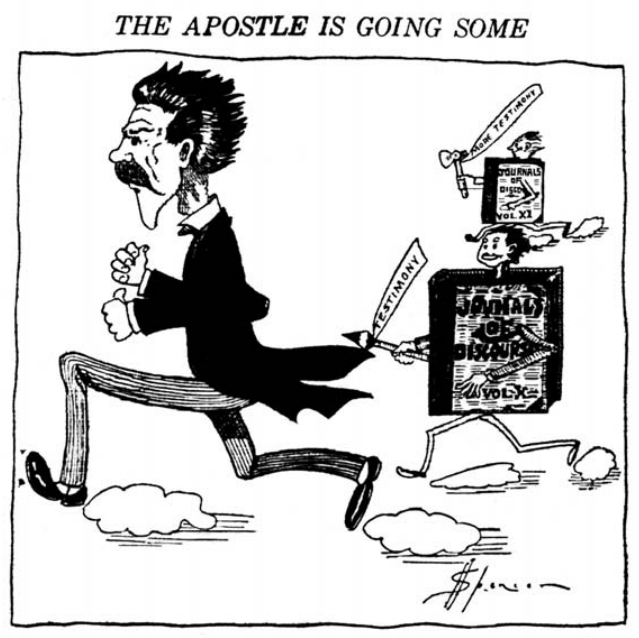
Reed Smoot is shown fleeing two volumes of the Journal of Discourses. Protestants used quotes from the volumes of teachings of the prophets when asking Smoot questions about his religion.

Some opponents claimed that temple-attending Latter-day Saints took an "oath of vengeance" against the United States for past grievances. As a leader of the LDS Church, Smoot was accused of taking this oath, which he denied. Although the majority of the investigative committee recommended that Smoot be removed from office, on February 20, 1907, the two-thirds majority required to expel Smoot failed, and he was allowed to keep his seat.

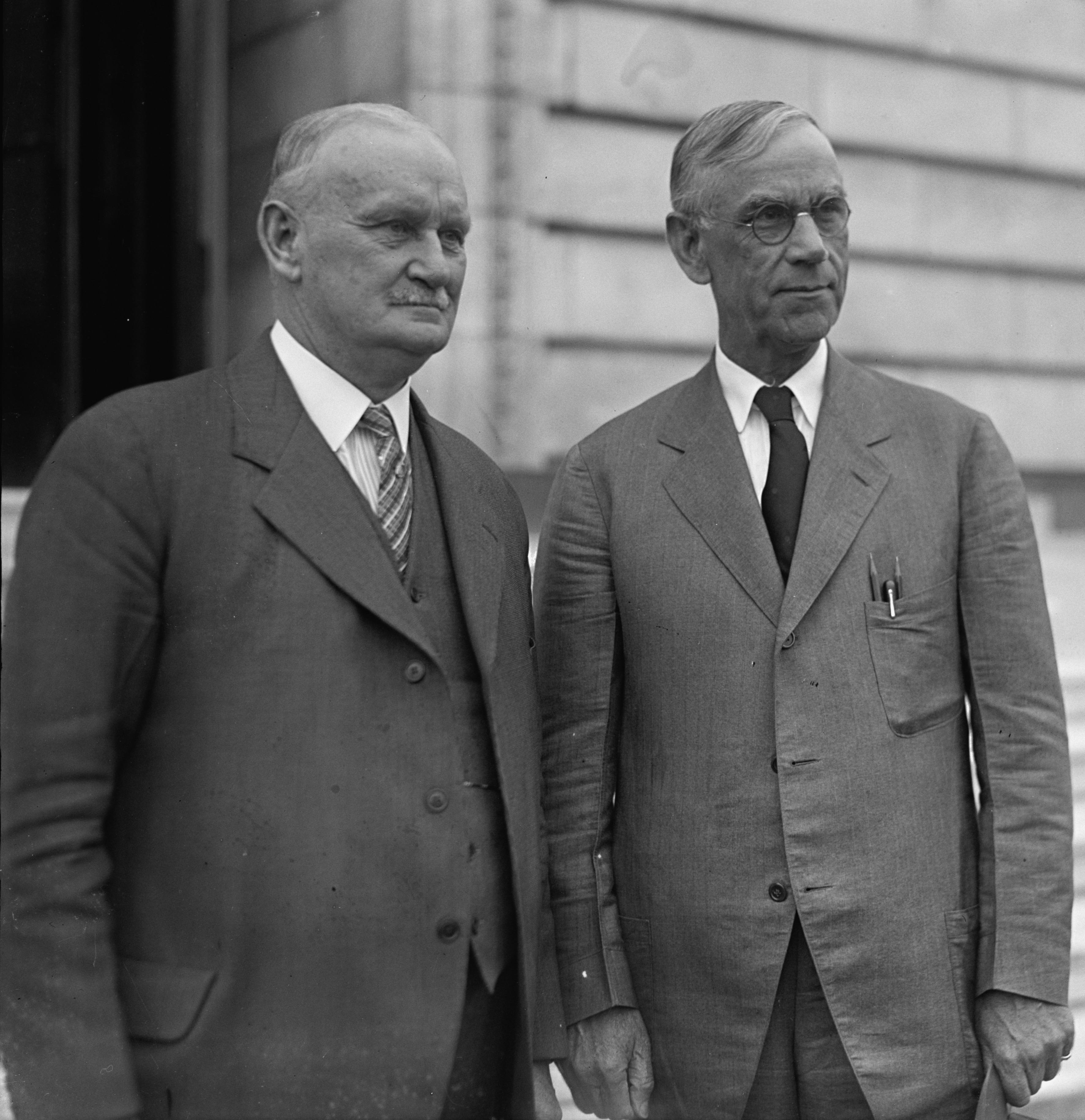
Willis C. Hawley (left) and Smoot in April 1929, shortly before the Smoot–Hawley Tariff Act passed the House

=== Political career ===
Senator Smoot (Republican, Ut.)
Is planning a ban on smut.
Oh rooti-ti-toot for Smoot of Ut.
And his reverend occiput.
Smite, Smoot, smite for Ut.,
Grit your molars and do your dut.,
Gird up your l__ns,
Smite h_p and th_gh,
We'll all be Kansas
By and by. ...

— Nash, Ogden (January 11, 1930), "Invocation", The New Yorker, p. 30.

In 1908, Smoot was reelected and continued to be reelected to successive terms until 1932, serving in the Senate until March 1933. A constitutional amendment mandated the popular election of U.S. senators after 1913. He was defeated in the 1932 election.

In 1916, William Kent was the lead sponsor in the House of Representatives of legislation to establish the National Park Service. Smoot sponsored the similar Senate bill. The legislation passed the House of Representatives on July 1, 1916, passed the Senate on August 5, and was signed by U.S. President Woodrow Wilson on August 25, 1916. The agency was placed within the cabinet Department of Interior.

Time magazine in December 1926 described Charles Curtis and Smoot as the two leading senators, stating that the Chairman of the Senate Finance Committee spoke "with a dry holy passion for financial soundness". Smoot led the committee from 1923 to 1933, and served on the Senate Appropriations Committee. He became active in the national Republican Party and served as a delegate to the Republican national convention every four years between 1908 and 1924. He was Chairman of the 1928 Resolutions Committee at the 1928 Republican National Convention and Chairman of the Republican Senatorial Campaign Committee.

Smoot was a co-sponsor of the Smoot–Hawley Tariff Act in 1930, which raised U.S. import tariffs on over 20,000 dutiable items to record levels. Many historians believe that it exacerbated the Great Depression. U.S. President Herbert Hoover signed the act into law on June 17, 1930. In November 1930, Smoot defended the Act against criticisms that the tariffs were harming U.S. business,

"Thousands and thousands of people are at work today with the boot and shoe and textile and other industries who would be idle except for the new tariff... The purchasing power of the farmer is being sustained, thus creating more work for other people... since the tariff bill passed wages have been falling in every country in the world except the United States. And, with this widening difference between American and foreign wages, the question is now whether the tariff is high enough, not whether it is too high."

Smoot served five terms before being defeated in the 1932 election by Democrat Elbert D. Thomas. After his unsuccessful reelection campaign, Smoot moved back to Salt Lake City. He retired from active business and political pursuits to dedicate his remaining years as an apostle for the LDS Church. Smoot died on February 9, 1941, during a visit to St. Petersburg, Florida.

== See also ==
- List of United States senators expelled or censured
- Reed Smoot hearings
- Smoot–Hawley Tariff Act
- Reed O. Smoot House
- Smoot–Rowlett family

The Church of Jesus Christ of Latter-day Saints titles
Preceded by Rudger Clawson	Quorum of the Twelve Apostles; 1900–1941	Succeeded by Hyrum M. Smith
U.S. Senate
Preceded by Joseph L. Rawlins	U.S. Senator (Class 3) from Utah; 1903–1933; Served alongside: Thomas Kearns, George Sutherland, William H. King	Succeeded by Elbert D. Thomas
Preceded by Alfred Kittredge	Chair of the Senate Patents Committee; 1907–1909	Succeeded by Norris Brown
Preceded by Knute Nelson	Chair of the Senate Public Lands Committee; 1912–1913	Succeeded by George Chamberlain
Preceded by Henry L. Myers	Chair of the Senate Public Lands Committee; 1919–1923	Succeeded by Irvine Lenroot
Preceded by Porter J. McCumber	Chair of the Senate Finance Committee; 1923–1933	Succeeded by Pat Harrison
Party political offices
First	Republican nominee for U.S. Senator from Utah (Class 3); 1914, 1920, 1926, 1932	Succeeded by Franklin S. Harris
Honorary titles
Preceded by Furnifold Simmons	Dean of the United States Senate; 1931–1933	Succeeded by William E. Borah
Preceded by Furnifold Simmons	Most senior living U.S. senator (Sitting or former); 1940–1941	Succeeded by Charles Dick
