= Martin N. Johnson =

American politician (1850–1909)

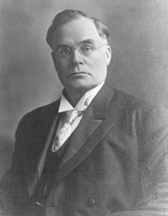

United States Senator from North Dakota
- In office March 4, 1909 – October 21, 1909
- Preceded by: Henry C. Hansbrough
- Succeeded by: Fountain L. Thompson

Member of the U.S. House of Representatives from North Dakota's at-large district
- In office March 4, 1891 – March 3, 1899
- Preceded by: Henry C. Hansbrough
- Succeeded by: Burleigh F. Spalding

Member of the Iowa Senate
- In office 1878–1882

Member of the Iowa House of Representatives
- In office 1877

Personal details
- Born: March 3, 1850 Racine County, Wisconsin
- Died: October 21, 1909 (aged 59) Fargo, North Dakota
- Party: Republican

Martin Nelson Johnson (March 3, 1850 – October 21, 1909) was an American attorney and politician who served as a United States representative and senator from North Dakota.

== Early life and education ==
Born to Norwegian immigrants in Racine County, Wisconsin in 1850, he moved with his parents to Decorah, Iowa in the same year. He was taught at home and attended the country schools. Johnson started college at Upper Iowa University in Fayette, Iowa, later transferring to the University of Iowa at Iowa City where he graduated with a bachelors in law from the law department in 1873.

== Career ==
Johnson taught for two years at the California Military Academy at Oakland, California, and returned to Iowa in 1875, was admitted to the bar in 1876, and commenced practice in Decorah. He was a member of the Iowa House of Representatives in 1877 and a member of the Iowa Senate from 1878 to 1882, where he served as chairman of the Committee on the State Library in both chambers. He was a presidential elector on the Republican ticket in 1876.

In 1879 Johnson married Stella White. In October 1882 the two moved to the Dakota Territory to pursue agricultural prospects. They purchased 2,500 acres near the Great Northern Railway a few miles west of Larimore, North Dakota. Johnson and his neighbor, Levi Peterson, established a town near the railroad named Petersburg.

He was district attorney of Nelson County from 1886 to 1890, and was a member of the constitutional convention of North Dakota in 1889, where he gained attention for his support of a unicameral state legislature. He was recruited to join the state's constitutional convention as part of an effort by the Scandinavian Republican League to get as many Scandinavian delegates as possible into the convention. Only 10 out of 75 delegates selected were of Scandinavian descent. Johnson was an active member of the North Dakota Farmers' Alliance, a group representing the interests and concerns of farmers. Feeling like they had found a strong voice, Norwegian farmers across North Dakota fought to get Johnson on the ballot for the U.S. Senate. The newly formed state legislative assembly elected Lyman Casey after several days of voting. Johnson would have been the first Norwegian-American elected to the Senate.

Johnson continued his career in politics with a run for United States House of Representatives. He was elected in 1890, and served 4 terms from March 4, 1891, to March 4, 1899. He did not seek renomination at the end of his fourth term, instead choosing to seek a senate seat again. After losing the nomination to Porter J. McCumber, Johnson took a break from politics and returned to Petersburg.

In 1909, the state legislature elected Johnson over the incumbent Henry C. Hansbrough. His term began March 4, 1909. In the Senate, he was the chairman of the committee to Investigate Trespassers Upon Indian Lands. He was respected among his colleagues as a man with intelligence and ability. He presided over the Senate 9 times in his short career in the body. He served until his death on October 21, 1909, just eight months into his first term.

== Death ==
Johnson died on October 21, 1909, in the Gardner Hotel in Fargo, North Dakota after an attack of Bright's disease following nasal surgery. He was buried in the City Cemetery in Petersburg, North Dakota.

== See also ==
- List of members of the United States Congress who died in office (1900–1949)

U.S. House of Representatives
| Preceded by Henry C. Hansbrough | Member of the U.S. House of Representatives from North Dakota's at-large congressional district 1891–1899 | Succeeded by Burleigh F. Spalding |
U.S. Senate
| Preceded by Henry C. Hansbrough | United States Senator (Class 3) from North Dakota; 1909; Served alongside: Porter J. McCumber | Succeeded by Fountain L. Thompson |
