= 102nd United States Congress =

1991–1993 U.S. legislative term

←	101st	103rd	→
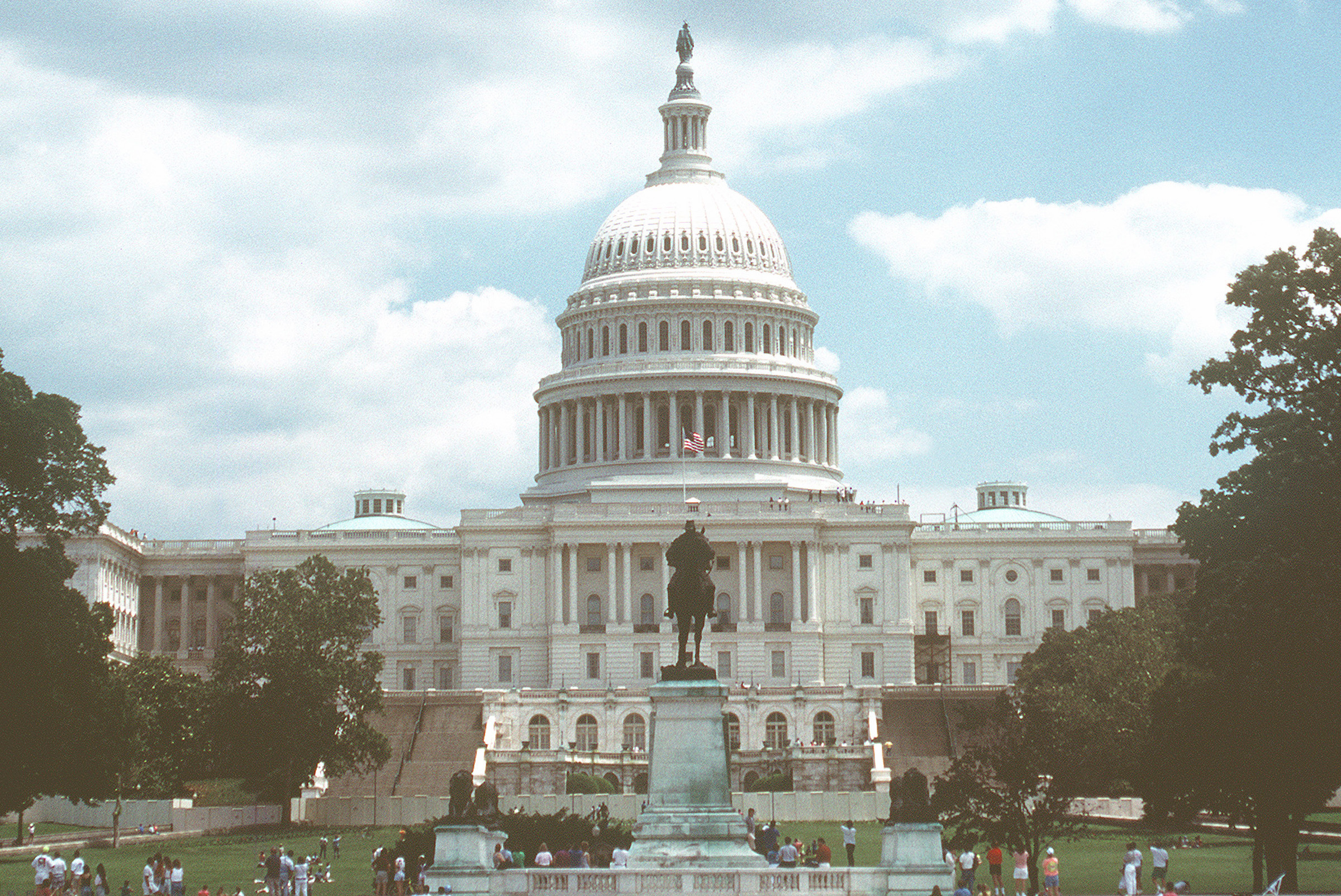
- United States Capitol (1991)

Overview
- Legislative body: United States Congress
- Jurisdiction: United States
- Term: January 3, 1991 – January 3, 1993

Senate
- Members: 100
- President: Dan Quayle (R)
- President pro tempore: Robert Byrd (D)
- Party control: Democratic

House of Representatives
- Members: 435 representatives 5 non-voting delegates
- Speaker: Tom Foley (D)
- Party control: Democratic

Sessions
- 1st: January 3, 1991 – January 3, 1992
- 2nd: January 3, 1992 – October 9, 1992

The 102nd United States Congress was a meeting of the legislative branch of the United States federal government, composed of the United States Senate and the United States House of Representatives. It met in Washington, D.C., from January 3, 1991, to January 3, 1993, during the last two years of George H. W. Bush's presidency. This is the most recent Congress where Republicans held a Senate seat from California.

The apportionment of seats in this House of Representatives was based on the 1980 United States census. Both chambers maintained a Democratic majority.

== Major events ==
- January 17, 1991 – February 28, 1991: Persian Gulf War
- May 16, 1991: Queen Elizabeth II of the United Kingdom addresses a Joint Meeting of Congress
- October 15, 1991: Confirmation of Clarence Thomas Supreme Court nomination at the Senate
- December 26, 1991: End of Cold War
- April 29 – May 3, 1992: 1992 Los Angeles riots
- November 3, 1992: Election of Bill Clinton as President of the United States

== Major legislation ==
- January 14, 1991: Authorization for Use of Military Force Against Iraq Resolution of 1991, Pub. L. 102–1, 105 Stat. 3
- February 6, 1991: Agent Orange Act of 1991, Pub. L. 102–4, 105 Stat. 11
- November 21, 1991: Civil Rights Act of 1991, Pub. L. 102–166, 105 Stat. 1071
- December 9, 1991: High Performance Computing and Communication Act of 1991, Pub. L. 102–194
- December 12, 1991: Soviet Nuclear Threat Reduction Act of 1991, Pub. L. 102–228, 105 Stat. 1691
- December 18, 1991: Intermodal Surface Transportation Efficiency Act, Pub. L. 102–240, 105 Stat. 1914
- December 19, 1991: Federal Deposit Insurance Corporation Improvement Act of 1991, Pub. L. 102–242, 105 Stat. 2236
- June 26, 1992: Copyright Renewal Act of 1992, Pub. L. 102–307, 106 Stat. 264
- October 9, 1992: Chinese Student Protection Act of 1992, Pub. L. 102–404, 106 Stat. 1969
- October 23, 1992: Former Soviet Union Demilitarization Act of 1992 Pub. L. 102–484, 106 Stat. 2315
- October 23, 1992: Weapons of Mass Destruction Control Act, Pub. L. 102–484 (div. A, title XV), 106 Stat. 2567
- October 24, 1992: Soviet Scientists Immigration Act of 1992, Pub. L. 102–509, 106 Stat. 3316
- October 24, 1992: Freedom Support Act, Pub. L. 102–511, 106 Stat. 3320
- October 24, 1992: Energy Policy Act of 1992, Pub. L. 102–486, 106 Stat. 2776
- October 26, 1992: President John F. Kennedy Assassination Records Collection Act of 1992, Pub. L. 102–526, 106 Stat. 3443
- October 28, 1992: Intermodal Surface Transportation Efficiency Act, Pub. L. 102–548, 106 Stat. 3646
- October 28, 1992: Audio Home Recording Act, Pub. L. 102–563, 106 Stat. 4237
- October 28, 1992: Land Remote Sensing Policy Act, Pub. L. 102–555, 106 Stat. 4163
- October 29, 1992: Weather Service Modernization Act of 1992, Pub. L. 102–567, 106 Stat. 4270
- November 2, 1992: High Seas Driftnet Fisheries Enforcement Act of 1992, Pub. L. 102–582, 106 Stat. 4900
- November 4, 1992: Abandoned Barge Act of 1992, Pub. L. 102–587, 106 Stat. 5039

== Constitutional amendments ==
- May 20, 1992: The House and the Senate each pass a concurrent resolution agreeing that the Twenty-seventh Amendment to the United States Constitution was validly ratified, despite the unorthodox period of more than 202 years for the completion of the task.

== Party summary ==
=== Senate ===
Party standings on the opening day of the 102nd Congress 56 Democratic senators 44 Republican senators

	Party (shading shows control)		Total	Vacant
	Democratic (D)	Republican (R)	Total	Vacant
End of previous congress	55	45	100	0
Begin	56	44	100	0
End	58	42	100	0
Final voting share	58.0%	42.0%		
Beginning of next congress	57	43	100	0

=== House of Representatives ===
	Party (Shading indicates majority caucus)			Total	
	Democratic	Independent	Republican	Total	Vacant
End of the previous Congress	259	0	174	433	2
Begin	267	1	167	435	0
End	267	1	166	434	1
Final voting share	61.8%		38.2%		
Beginning of the next Congress	258	1	176	435	0

== Leadership ==
Senate President

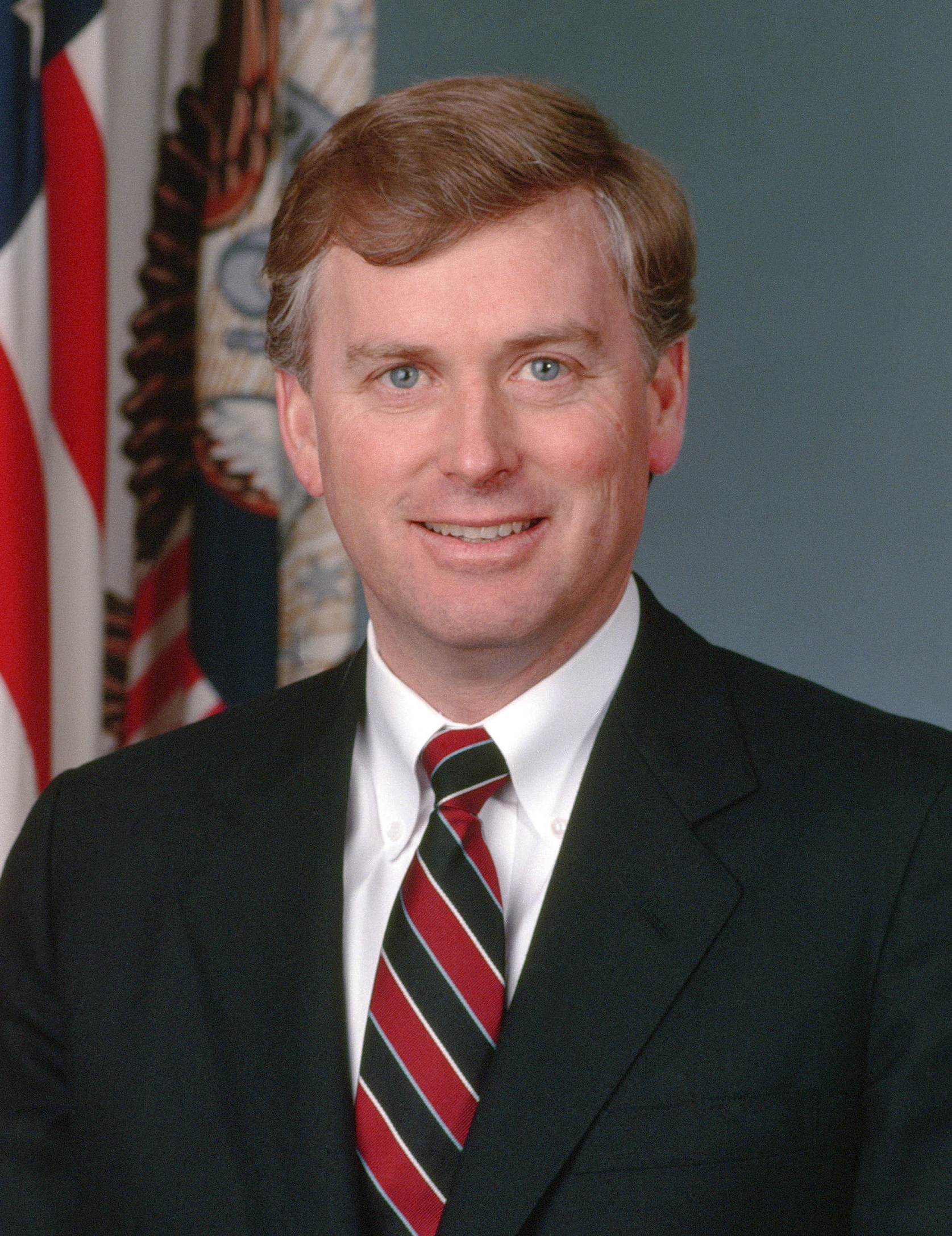
Dan Quayle (R)

Senate President pro Tempore

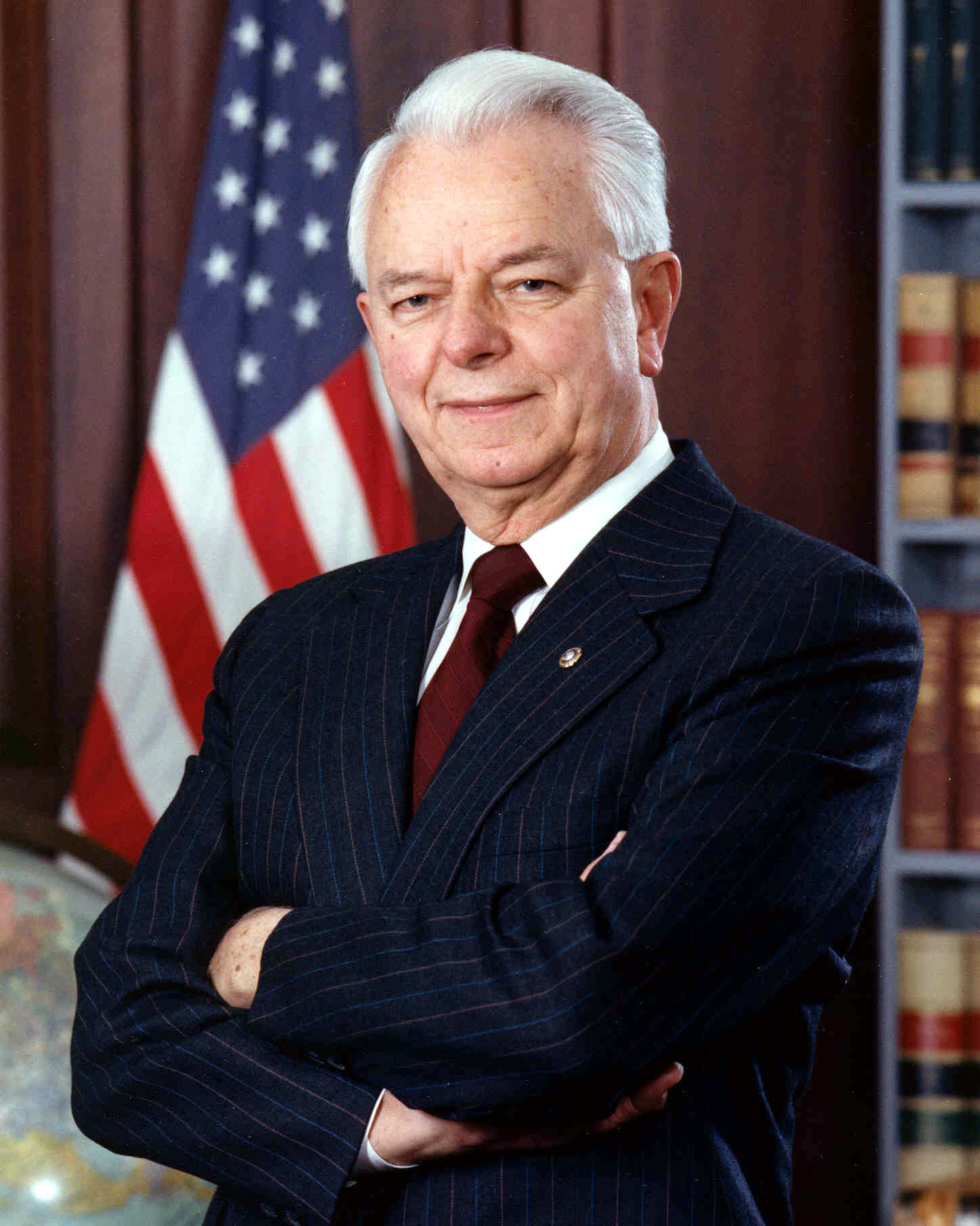
Robert Byrd (D)

House Speaker

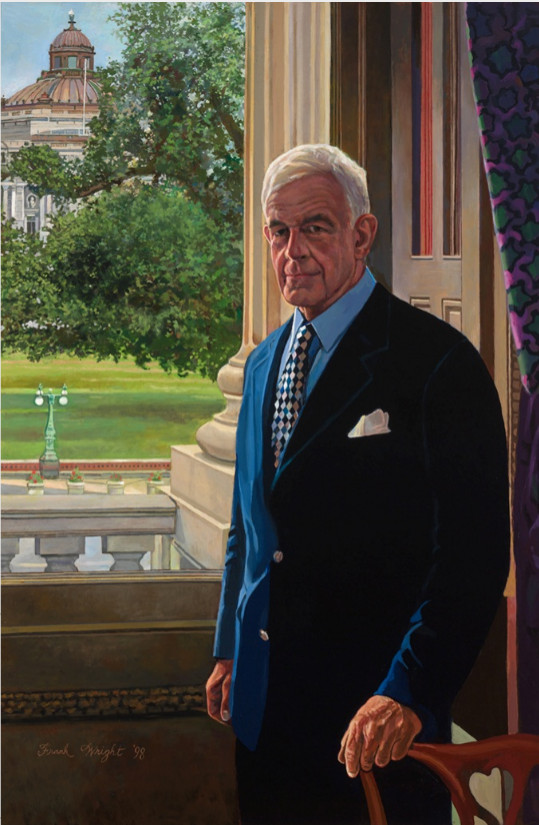
Tom Foley (D)

=== Senate ===
- President: Dan Quayle (R)
- President pro tempore: Robert Byrd (D)

==== Majority (Democratic) leadership ====
- Majority Leader: George Mitchell
- Majority Whip: Wendell Ford
- Policy Committee Co-Chair: Harry Reid
- Democratic Caucus Secretary: David Pryor
- Democratic Campaign Committee Chairman: Chuck Robb
- Chief Deputy Whip: Alan J. Dixon

==== Minority (Republican) leadership ====
- Minority Leader: Bob Dole
- Minority Whip: Alan Simpson
- Republican Conference Chairman: Thad Cochran
- Republican Conference Secretary: Bob Kasten
- National Senatorial Committee Chair: Phil Gramm
- Policy Committee Chairman: Don Nickles

=== House of Representatives ===
- Speaker: Tom Foley (D)

==== Majority (Democratic) leadership ====
- Majority Leader: Dick Gephardt
- Majority Whip: William H. Gray III, until September 11, 1991
  - David Bonior, from September 11, 1991
- Chief Deputy Majority Whips: Barbara Kennelly, Butler Derrick, & John Lewis
- Democratic Caucus Chairman: Steny Hoyer
- Democratic Caucus Vice-Chairman: Vic Fazio

==== Minority (Republican) leadership ====
- Minority Leader: Robert H. Michel
- Minority Whip: Newt Gingrich
- Chief Deputy Whip: Robert Smith Walker
- Republican Conference Chairman: Jerry Lewis
- Republican Conference Vice-Chairman: Bill McCollum
- Republican Conference Secretary: Vin Weber
- Policy Committee Chairman: Mickey Edwards
- Republican Campaign Committee Chairman: Guy Vander Jagt

== Caucuses ==
- Armenian Caucus
- Biomedical Research Caucus
- Congressional Arts Caucus
- Congressional Automotive Caucus
- Congressional Black Caucus
- Congressional Fire Services Caucus
- Congressional Friends of Ireland Caucus
- Congressional Hispanic Caucus
- Congressional Pediatric & Adult Hydrocephalus Caucus
- Congressional Progressive Caucus
- Congressional Travel & Tourism Caucus
- Congressional Western Caucus
- Congresswomen's Caucus
- House Democratic Caucus
- Senate Democratic Caucus

== Members ==
This list is arranged by chamber, then by state. Senators are listed in order of seniority, and representatives are listed by district.

=== Senate ===
Senators are popularly elected statewide every two years, with one-third beginning new six-year terms with each Congress, In this Congress, Class 3 meant their term ended with this Congress, requiring reelection in 1992; Class 1 meant their term began in the last Congress, requiring reelection in 1994; and Class 2 meant their term began in this Congress, requiring reelection in 1996.

==== Alabama ====
▌2. Howell Heflin (D)
▌3. Richard Shelby (D)

==== Alaska ====
▌2. Ted Stevens (R)
▌3. Frank Murkowski (R)

==== Arizona ====
▌1. Dennis DeConcini (D)
▌3. John McCain (R)

==== Arkansas ====
▌3. Dale Bumpers (D)
▌2. David Pryor (D)

==== California ====
▌1. Pete Wilson (R), until January 7, 1991

▌John Seymour (R), from January 7, 1991, until November 4, 1992
▌Dianne Feinstein (D), from November 4, 1992

▌3. Alan Cranston (D)

==== Colorado ====
▌2. Hank Brown (R)
▌3. Tim Wirth (D)

==== Connecticut ====
▌1. Joe Lieberman (D)
▌3. Chris Dodd (D)

==== Delaware ====
▌1. William Roth (R)
▌2. Joe Biden (D)

==== Florida ====
▌1. Connie Mack III (R)
▌3. Bob Graham (D)

==== Georgia ====
▌2. Sam Nunn (D)
▌3. Wyche Fowler (D)

==== Hawaii ====
▌1. Daniel Akaka (D)
▌3. Daniel Inouye (D)

==== Idaho ====
▌2. Larry Craig (R)
▌3. Steve Symms (R)

==== Illinois ====
▌2. Paul Simon (D)
▌3. Alan J. Dixon (D)

==== Indiana ====
▌1. Richard Lugar (R)
▌3. Dan Coats (R)

==== Iowa ====
▌2. Tom Harkin (D)
▌3. Chuck Grassley (R)

==== Kansas ====
▌2. Nancy Kassebaum (R)
▌3. Bob Dole (R)

==== Kentucky ====
▌2. Mitch McConnell (R)
▌3. Wendell Ford (D)

==== Louisiana ====
▌2. J. Bennett Johnston (D)
▌3. John Breaux (D)

==== Maine ====
▌1. George J. Mitchell (D)
▌2. William Cohen (R)

==== Maryland ====
▌1. Paul Sarbanes (D)
▌3. Barbara Mikulski (D)

==== Massachusetts ====
▌1. Ted Kennedy (D)
▌2. John Kerry (D)

==== Michigan ====
▌1. Donald Riegle (D)
▌2. Carl Levin (D)

==== Minnesota ====
▌1. David Durenberger (I-R) (Note: The Republican Party of Minnesota was officially known as the Independent-Republicans of Minnesota from November 15, 1975, until September 23, 1995, and are counted as Republicans.)
▌2. Paul Wellstone (DFL) (Note: The Minnesota Democratic–Farmer–Labor Party (DFL) and the North Dakota Democratic-Nonpartisan League Party (D-NPL) are the Minnesota and North Dakota affiliates of the U.S. Democratic Party and are counted as Democrats.)

==== Mississippi ====
▌1. Trent Lott (R)
▌2. Thad Cochran (R)

==== Missouri ====
▌1. John Danforth (R)
▌3. Kit Bond (R)

==== Montana ====
▌1. Conrad Burns (R)
▌2. Max Baucus (D)

==== Nebraska ====
▌1. Bob Kerrey (D)
▌2. Jim Exon (D)

==== Nevada ====
▌1. Richard Bryan (D)
▌3. Harry Reid (D)

==== New Hampshire ====
▌2. Bob Smith (R)
▌3. Warren Rudman (R)

==== New Jersey ====
▌1. Frank Lautenberg (D)
▌2. Bill Bradley (D)

==== New Mexico ====
▌1. Jeff Bingaman (D)
▌2. Pete Domenici (R)

==== New York ====
▌1. Daniel Patrick Moynihan (D)
▌3. Al D'Amato (R)

==== North Carolina ====
▌2. Jesse Helms (R)
▌3. Terry Sanford (D)

==== North Dakota ====
▌1. Quentin Burdick (D-NPL), until September 8, 1992

▌Jocelyn Burdick (D-NPL), from September 12, 1992, until December 14, 1992
▌Kent Conrad (D-NPL), from December 14, 1992

▌3. Kent Conrad (D-NPL), until December 14, 1992

▌Byron Dorgan (D-NPL), from December 15, 1992

==== Ohio ====
▌1. Howard Metzenbaum (D)
▌3. John Glenn (D)

==== Oklahoma ====
▌2. David Boren (D)
▌3. Don Nickles (R)

==== Oregon ====
▌2. Mark Hatfield (R)
▌3. Bob Packwood (R)

==== Pennsylvania ====
▌1. John Heinz (R), until April 4, 1991

▌Harris Wofford (D), from May 9, 1991

▌3. Arlen Specter (R)

==== Rhode Island ====
▌1. John Chafee (R)
▌2. Claiborne Pell (D)

==== South Carolina ====
▌2. Strom Thurmond (R)
▌3. Fritz Hollings (D)

==== South Dakota ====
▌2. Larry Pressler (R)
▌3. Tom Daschle (D)

==== Tennessee ====
▌1. Jim Sasser (D)
▌2. Al Gore (D), until January 2, 1993

▌Harlan Mathews (D), from January 2, 1993

==== Texas ====
▌1. Lloyd Bentsen (D)
▌2. Phil Gramm (R)

==== Utah ====
▌1. Orrin Hatch (R)
▌3. Jake Garn (R)

==== Vermont ====
▌1. Jim Jeffords (R)
▌3. Patrick Leahy (D)

==== Virginia ====
▌1. Chuck Robb (D)
▌2. John Warner (R)

==== Washington ====
▌1. Slade Gorton (R)
▌3. Brock Adams (D)

==== West Virginia ====
▌1. Robert Byrd (D)
▌2. Jay Rockefeller (D)

==== Wisconsin ====
▌1. Herb Kohl (D)
▌3. Bob Kasten (R)

==== Wyoming ====
▌1. Malcolm Wallop (R)
▌2. Alan Simpson (R)

Senators' party membership by state at the opening of the 102nd Congress in January 1991 2 Democrats 1 Democrat and 1 Republican 2 Republicans

Senate majority leadership

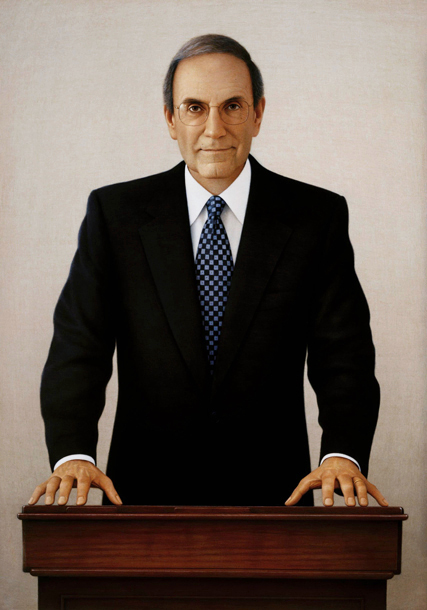
Democratic leader
George J. Mitchell

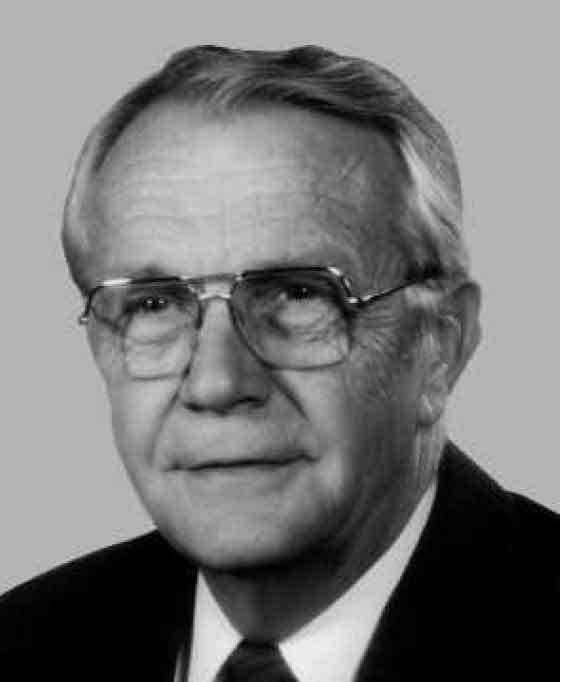
Democratic whip
Wendell Ford

Senate minority leadership

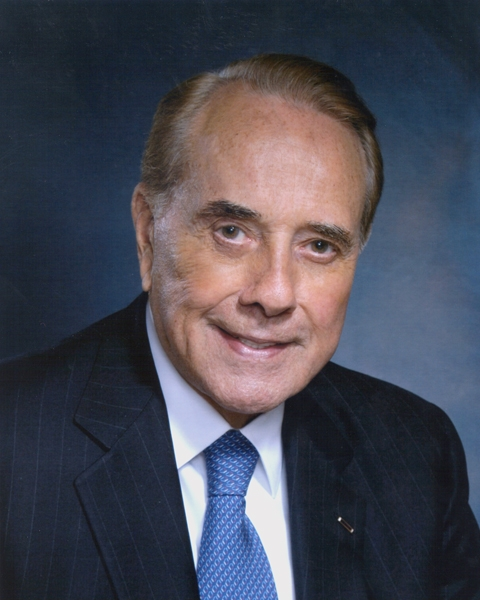
Republican leader
Bob Dole

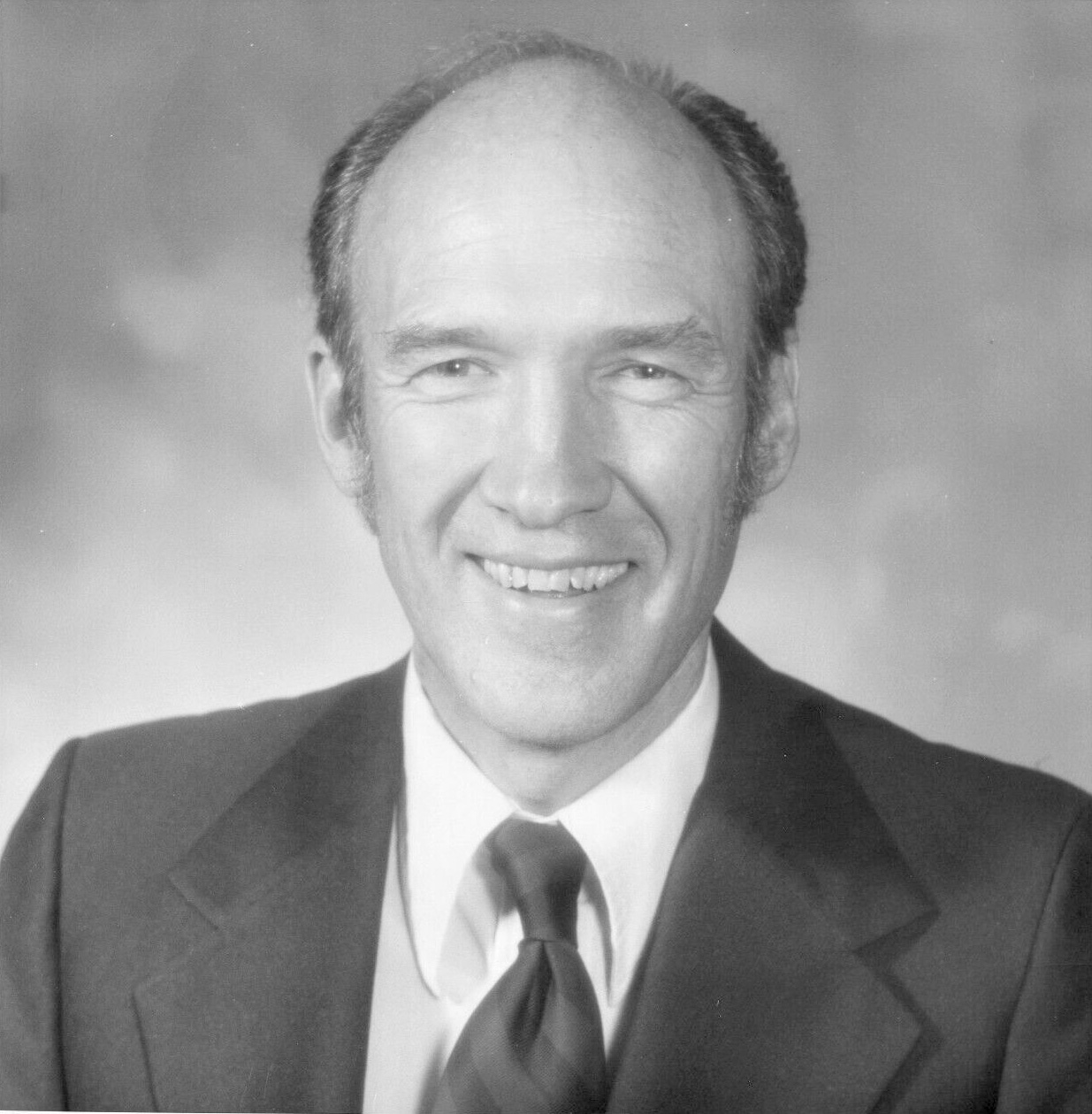
Republican whip
Alan K. Simpson

=== House of Representatives ===
==== Alabama ====
(5-2 Democratic)

▌1. Sonny Callahan (R)
▌2. William L. Dickinson (R)
▌3. Glen Browder (D)
▌4. Tom Bevill (D)
▌5. Bud Cramer (D)
▌6. Ben Erdreich (D)
▌7. Claude Harris Jr. (D)

==== Alaska ====
(1 Republican)

▌At-large Don Young (R)

==== Arizona ====
(4-1 Republican)

▌1. Jay Rhodes (R)
▌2. Mo Udall (D), until May 4, 1991 (resigned due to illness)

▌Ed Pastor (D), from September 24, 1991

▌3. Bob Stump (R)
▌4. Jon Kyl (R)
▌5. Jim Kolbe (R)

==== Arkansas ====
(3-1 Democratic)

▌1. Bill Alexander (D)
▌2. Ray Thornton (D)
▌3. John Paul Hammerschmidt (R)
▌4. Beryl Anthony Jr. (D)

==== California ====
(26-19 Democratic)

▌1. Frank Riggs (R)
▌2. Wally Herger (R)
▌3. Bob Matsui (D)
▌4. Vic Fazio (D)
▌5. Nancy Pelosi (D)
▌6. Barbara Boxer (D)
▌7. George Miller (D)
▌8. Ron Dellums (D)
▌9. Pete Stark (D)
▌10. Don Edwards (D)
▌11. Tom Lantos (D)
▌12. Tom Campbell (R)
▌13. Norman Mineta (D)
▌14. John Doolittle (R)
▌15. Gary Condit (D)
▌16. Leon Panetta (D)
▌17. Cal Dooley (D)
▌18. Richard H. Lehman (D)
▌19. Robert Lagomarsino (R)
▌20. Bill Thomas (R)
▌21. Elton Gallegly (R)
▌22. Carlos Moorhead (R)
▌23. Anthony Beilenson (D)
▌24. Henry Waxman (D)
▌25. Edward R. Roybal (D)
▌26. Howard Berman (D)
▌27. Mel Levine (D)
▌28. Julian Dixon (D)
▌29. Maxine Waters (D)
▌30. Matthew G. Martínez (D)
▌31. Mervyn Dymally (D)
▌32. Glenn M. Anderson (D)
▌33. David Dreier (R)
▌34. Esteban Torres (D)
▌35. Jerry Lewis (R)
▌36. George Brown Jr. (D)
▌37. Al McCandless (R)
▌38. Bob Dornan (R)
▌39. William Dannemeyer (R)
▌40. Christopher Cox (R)
▌41. Bill Lowery (R)
▌42. Dana Rohrabacher (R)
▌43. Ron Packard (R)
▌44. Duke Cunningham (R)
▌45. Duncan L. Hunter (R)

==== Colorado ====
(3-3 split)

▌1. Pat Schroeder (D)
▌2. David Skaggs (D)
▌3. Ben Nighthorse Campbell (D)
▌4. Wayne Allard (R)
▌5. Joel Hefley (R)
▌6. Dan Schaefer (R)

==== Connecticut ====
(3-3 split)

▌1. Barbara B. Kennelly (D)
▌2. Sam Gejdenson (D)
▌3. Rosa DeLauro (D)
▌4. Chris Shays (R)
▌5. Gary Franks (R)
▌6. Nancy Johnson (R)

==== Delaware ====
(1 Democrat)

▌At-large Tom Carper (D)

==== Florida ====
(10-9 Republican)

▌1. Earl Hutto (D)
▌2. Pete Peterson (D)
▌3. Charles E. Bennett (D)
▌4. Craig James (R)
▌5. Bill McCollum (R)
▌6. Cliff Stearns (R)
▌7. Sam Gibbons (D)
▌8. Bill Young (R)
▌9. Michael Bilirakis (R)
▌10. Andy Ireland (R)
▌11. Jim Bacchus (D)
▌12. Tom Lewis (R)
▌13. Porter Goss (R)
▌14. Harry Johnston (D)
▌15. Clay Shaw (R)
▌16. Lawrence J. Smith (D)
▌17. William Lehman (D)
▌18. Ileana Ros-Lehtinen (R)
▌19. Dante Fascell (D)

==== Georgia ====
(9-1 Democratic)

▌1. Lindsay Thomas (D)
▌2. Charles Hatcher (D)
▌3. Richard Ray (D)
▌4. Ben Jones (D)
▌5. John Lewis (D)
▌6. Newt Gingrich (R)
▌7. Buddy Darden (D)
▌8. J. Roy Rowland (D)
▌9. Ed Jenkins (D)
▌10. Doug Barnard Jr. (D)

==== Hawaii ====
(2 Democrats)

▌1. Neil Abercrombie (D)
▌2. Patsy Mink (D)

==== Idaho ====
(2 Democrats)

▌1. Larry LaRocco (D)
▌2. Richard H. Stallings (D)

==== Illinois ====
(15-7 Democratic)

▌1. Charles Hayes (D)
▌2. Gus Savage (D)
▌3. Marty Russo (D)
▌4. George Sangmeister (D)
▌5. Bill Lipinski (D)
▌6. Henry Hyde (R)
▌7. Cardiss Collins (D)
▌8. Dan Rostenkowski (D)
▌9. Sidney R. Yates (D)
▌10. John Porter (R)
▌11. Frank Annunzio (D)
▌12. Phil Crane (R)
▌13. Harris Fawell (R)
▌14. Dennis Hastert (R)
▌15. Ed Madigan (R), until March 8, 1991

▌Tom Ewing (R), from July 2, 1991

▌16. John W. Cox Jr. (D)
▌17. Lane Evans (D)
▌18. Robert H. Michel (R)
▌19. Terry L. Bruce (D)
▌20. Dick Durbin (D)
▌21. Jerry Costello (D)
▌22. Glenn Poshard (D)

==== Indiana ====
(8-2 Democratic)

▌1. Pete Visclosky (D)
▌2. Philip Sharp (D)
▌3. Tim Roemer (D)
▌4. Jill L. Long (D)
▌5. Jim Jontz (D)
▌6. Dan Burton (R)
▌7. John T. Myers (R)
▌8. Frank McCloskey (D)
▌9. Lee Hamilton (D)
▌10. Andrew Jacobs Jr. (D)

==== Iowa ====
(4-2 Republican)

▌1. Jim Leach (R)
▌2. Jim Nussle (R)
▌3. David R. Nagle (D)
▌4. Neal Smith (D)
▌5. Jim Ross Lightfoot (R)
▌6. Fred Grandy (R)

==== Kansas ====
(3-2 Republican)

▌1. Pat Roberts (R)
▌2. Jim Slattery (D)
▌3. Jan Meyers (R)
▌4. Dan Glickman (D)
▌5. Dick Nichols (R)

==== Kentucky ====
(4-3 Democratic)

▌1. Carroll Hubbard (D)
▌2. William Natcher (D)
▌3. Romano Mazzoli (D)
▌4. Jim Bunning (R)
▌5. Hal Rogers (R)
▌6. Larry J. Hopkins (R)
▌7. Chris Perkins (D)

==== Louisiana ====
(4-4 split)

▌1. Bob Livingston (R)
▌2. William Jefferson (D)
▌3. Billy Tauzin (D)
▌4. Jim McCrery (R)
▌5. Jerry Huckaby (D)
▌6. Richard Baker (R)
▌7. Jimmy Hayes (D)
▌8. Clyde C. Holloway (R)

==== Maine ====
(1-1 split)

▌1. Thomas Andrews (D)
▌2. Olympia Snowe (R)

==== Maryland ====
(5-3 Democratic)

▌1. Wayne Gilchrest (R)
▌2. Helen Delich Bentley (R)
▌3. Ben Cardin (D)
▌4. Tom McMillen (D)
▌5. Steny Hoyer (D)
▌6. Beverly Byron (D)
▌7. Kweisi Mfume (D)
▌8. Connie Morella (R)

==== Massachusetts ====
(10-1 Democratic)

▌1. Silvio O. Conte (R), until February 8, 1991

▌John Olver (D), from June 18, 1991

▌2. Richard Neal (D)
▌3. Joseph D. Early (D)
▌4. Barney Frank (D)
▌5. Chester G. Atkins (D)
▌6. Nicholas Mavroules (D)
▌7. Ed Markey (D)
▌8. Joseph P. Kennedy II (D)
▌9. Joe Moakley (D)
▌10. Gerry Studds (D)
▌11. Brian J. Donnelly (D)

==== Michigan ====
(11-7 Democratic)

▌1. John Conyers (D)
▌2. Carl Pursell (R)
▌3. Howard Wolpe (D)
▌4. Fred Upton (R)
▌5. Paul B. Henry (R)
▌6. Bob Carr (D)
▌7. Dale Kildee (D)
▌8. Bob Traxler (D)
▌9. Guy Vander Jagt (R)
▌10. Dave Camp (R)
▌11. Bob Davis (R)
▌12. David Bonior (D)
▌13. Barbara-Rose Collins (D)
▌14. Dennis Hertel (D)
▌15. William D. Ford (D)
▌16. John Dingell (D)
▌17. Sander Levin (D)
▌18. William Broomfield (R)

==== Minnesota ====
(6-2 Democratic)

▌1. Tim Penny (DFL)
▌2. Vin Weber (I-R)
▌3. Jim Ramstad (I-R)
▌4. Bruce Vento (DFL)
▌5. Martin Olav Sabo (DFL)
▌6. Gerry Sikorski (DFL)
▌7. Collin Peterson (DFL)
▌8. Jim Oberstar (DFL)

==== Mississippi ====
(5 Democrats)

▌1. Jamie Whitten (D)
▌2. Mike Espy (D)
▌3. Sonny Montgomery (D)
▌4. Michael Parker (D)
▌5. Gene Taylor (D)

==== Missouri ====
(6-3 Democratic)

▌1. Bill Clay (D)
▌2. Joan Kelly Horn (D)
▌3. Dick Gephardt (D)
▌4. Ike Skelton (D)
▌5. Alan Wheat (D)
▌6. Tom Coleman (R)
▌7. Mel Hancock (R)
▌8. Bill Emerson (R)
▌9. Harold Volkmer (D)

==== Montana ====
(1-1 split)

▌1. Pat Williams (D)
▌2. Ron Marlenee (R)

==== Nebraska ====
(2-1 Republican)

▌1. Doug Bereuter (R)
▌2. Peter Hoagland (D)
▌3. Bill Barrett (R)

==== Nevada ====
(1-1 split)

▌1. James Bilbray (D)
▌2. Barbara Vucanovich (R)

==== New Hampshire ====
(1-1 split)

▌1. Bill Zeliff (R)
▌2. Dick Swett (D)

==== New Jersey ====
(8-6 Democratic)

▌1. Rob Andrews (D)
▌2. William J. Hughes (D)
▌3. Frank Pallone (D)
▌4. Chris Smith (R)
▌5. Marge Roukema (R)
▌6. Bernard J. Dwyer (D)
▌7. Matthew J. Rinaldo (R)
▌8. Robert A. Roe (D)
▌9. Robert Torricelli (D)
▌10. Donald M. Payne (D)
▌11. Dean Gallo (R)
▌12. Dick Zimmer (R)
▌13. Jim Saxton (R)
▌14. Frank J. Guarini (D)

==== New Mexico ====
(2-1 Republican)

▌1. Steven Schiff (R)
▌2. Joe Skeen (R)
▌3. Bill Richardson (D)

==== New York ====
(21-13 Democratic)

▌1. George J. Hochbrueckner (D)
▌2. Thomas Downey (D)
▌3. Robert J. Mrazek (D)
▌4. Norman F. Lent (R)
▌5. Raymond J. McGrath (R)
▌6. Floyd Flake (D)
▌7. Gary Ackerman (D)
▌8. James H. Scheuer (D)
▌9. Thomas Manton (D)
▌10. Chuck Schumer (D)
▌11. Edolphus Towns (D)
▌12. Major Owens (D)
▌13. Stephen Solarz (D)
▌14. Susan Molinari (R)
▌15. Bill Green (R)
▌16. Charles Rangel (D)
▌17. Ted Weiss (D), until September 14, 1992

▌Jerry Nadler (D), from November 3, 1992

▌18. José E. Serrano (D)
▌19. Eliot Engel (D)
▌20. Nita Lowey (D)
▌21. Hamilton Fish IV (R)
▌22. Benjamin Gilman (R)
▌23. Michael McNulty (D)
▌24. Gerald Solomon (R)
▌25. Sherwood Boehlert (R)
▌26. David O'Brien Martin (R)
▌27. James T. Walsh (R)
▌28. Matthew F. McHugh (D)
▌29. Frank Horton (R)
▌30. Louise Slaughter (D)
▌31. Bill Paxon (R)
▌32. John LaFalce (D)
▌33. Henry J. Nowak (D)
▌34. Amo Houghton (R)

==== North Carolina ====
(7-4 Democratic)

▌1. Walter B. Jones Sr. (D), until September 15, 1992

▌Eva Clayton (D), from November 3, 1992

▌2. Tim Valentine (D)
▌3. Martin Lancaster (D)
▌4. David Price (D)
▌5. Stephen L. Neal (D)
▌6. Howard Coble (R)
▌7. Charlie Rose (D)
▌8. Bill Hefner (D)
▌9. Alex McMillan (R)
▌10. Cass Ballenger (R)
▌11. Charles Taylor (R)

==== North Dakota ====
(1 Democrat)

▌At-large Byron Dorgan (D-NPL), until December 14, 1992

==== Ohio ====
(11-10 Democratic)

▌1. Charlie Luken (D)
▌2. Bill Gradison (R)
▌3. Tony P. Hall (D)
▌4. Mike Oxley (R)
▌5. Paul Gillmor (R)
▌6. Bob McEwen (R)
▌7. Dave Hobson (R)
▌8. John Boehner (R)
▌9. Marcy Kaptur (D)
▌10. Clarence E. Miller (R)
▌11. Dennis E. Eckart (D)
▌12. John Kasich (R)
▌13. Don Pease (D)
▌14. Tom Sawyer (D)
▌15. Chalmers Wylie (R)
▌16. Ralph Regula (R)
▌17. James Traficant (D)
▌18. Douglas Applegate (D)
▌19. Ed Feighan (D)
▌20. Mary Rose Oakar (D)
▌21. Louis Stokes (D)

==== Oklahoma ====
(4-2 Democratic)

▌1. Jim Inhofe (R)
▌2. Mike Synar (D)
▌3. Bill Brewster (D)
▌4. Dave McCurdy (D)
▌5. Mickey Edwards (R)
▌6. Glenn English (D)

==== Oregon ====
(4-1 Democratic)

▌1. Les AuCoin (D)
▌2. Bob Smith (R)
▌3. Ron Wyden (D)
▌4. Peter DeFazio (D)
▌5. Mike Kopetski (D)

==== Pennsylvania ====
(12-11 Republican)

▌1. Thomas M. Foglietta (D)
▌2. William H. Gray III (D), until September 11, 1991

▌Lucien Blackwell (D), from November 5, 1991

▌3. Robert Borski (D)
▌4. Joe Kolter (D)
▌5. Dick Schulze (R)
▌6. Gus Yatron (D)
▌7. Curt Weldon (R)
▌8. Peter H. Kostmayer (D)
▌9. Bud Shuster (R)
▌10. Joseph M. McDade (R)
▌11. Paul Kanjorski (D)
▌12. John Murtha (D)
▌13. Lawrence Coughlin (R)
▌14. William J. Coyne (D)
▌15. Donald L. Ritter (R)
▌16. Bob Walker (R)
▌17. George Gekas (R)
▌18. Rick Santorum (R)
▌19. Bill Goodling (R)
▌20. Joseph M. Gaydos (D)
▌21. Tom Ridge (R)
▌22. Austin Murphy (D)
▌23. William Clinger (R)

==== Rhode Island ====
(1-1 split)

▌1. Ronald Machtley (R)
▌2. Jack Reed (D)

==== South Carolina ====
(4-2 Democratic)

▌1. Arthur Ravenel Jr. (R)
▌2. Floyd Spence (R)
▌3. Butler Derrick (D)
▌4. Liz J. Patterson (D)
▌5. John Spratt (D)
▌6. Robin Tallon (D)

==== South Dakota ====
(1 Democrat)

▌At-large Tim Johnson (D)

==== Tennessee ====
(6-3 Democratic)

▌1. Jimmy Quillen (R)
▌2. Jimmy Duncan (R)
▌3. Marilyn Lloyd (D)
▌4. Jim Cooper (D)
▌5. Bob Clement (D)
▌6. Bart Gordon (D)
▌7. Don Sundquist (R)
▌8. John Tanner (D)
▌9. Harold Ford Sr. (D)

==== Texas ====
(19-8 Democratic)

▌1. Jim Chapman (D)
▌2. Charlie Wilson (D)
▌3. Steve Bartlett (R), until March 11, 1991

▌Sam Johnson (R), from May 18, 1991

▌4. Ralph Hall (D)
▌5. John Bryant (D)
▌6. Joe Barton (R)
▌7. Bill Archer (R)
▌8. Jack Fields (R)
▌9. Jack Brooks (D)
▌10. J. J. Pickle (D)
▌11. Chet Edwards (D)
▌12. Pete Geren (D)
▌13. Bill Sarpalius (D)
▌14. Greg Laughlin (D)
▌15. Kika de la Garza (D)
▌16. Ron Coleman (D)
▌17. Charles Stenholm (D)
▌18. Craig Washington (D)
▌19. Larry Combest (R)
▌20. Henry B. González (D)
▌21. Lamar Smith (R)
▌22. Tom DeLay (R)
▌23. Albert Bustamante (D)
▌24. Martin Frost (D)
▌25. Michael A. Andrews (D)
▌26. Dick Armey (R)
▌27. Solomon Ortiz (D)

==== Utah ====
(2-1 Democratic)

▌1. Jim Hansen (R)
▌2. Wayne Owens (D)
▌3. Bill Orton (D)

==== Vermont ====
(1 Independent, caucusing with the Democrats)

▌At-large Bernie Sanders (I)

==== Virginia ====
(6-4 Democratic)

▌1. Herb Bateman (R)
▌2. Owen B. Pickett (D)
▌3. Thomas J. Bliley Jr. (R)
▌4. Norman Sisisky (D)
▌5. Lewis F. Payne Jr. (D)
▌6. Jim Olin (D)
▌7. D. French Slaughter Jr. (R), until November 5, 1991

▌George Allen (R), from November 5, 1991

▌8. Jim Moran (D)
▌9. Rick Boucher (D)
▌10. Frank Wolf (R)

==== Washington ====
(5-3 Democratic)

▌1. John Miller (R)
▌2. Al Swift (D)
▌3. Jolene Unsoeld (D)
▌4. Sid Morrison (R)
▌5. Tom Foley (D)
▌6. Norm Dicks (D)
▌7. Jim McDermott (D)
▌8. Rod Chandler (R)

==== West Virginia ====
(4 Democrats)

▌1. Alan Mollohan (D)
▌2. Harley O. Staggers Jr. (D)
▌3. Bob Wise (D)
▌4. Nick Rahall (D)

==== Wisconsin ====
(5-4 Republican)

▌1. Les Aspin (D)
▌2. Scott Klug (R)
▌3. Steve Gunderson (R)
▌4. Jerry Kleczka (D)
▌5. Jim Moody (D)
▌6. Tom Petri (R)
▌7. Dave Obey (D)
▌8. Toby Roth (R)
▌9. Jim Sensenbrenner (R)

==== Wyoming ====
(1 Republican)

▌At-large Craig L. Thomas (R)

==== Non-voting members ====
(3-1 Democratic)

▌American Samoa: Eni Faleomavaega (D)
▌District of Columbia: Eleanor Holmes Norton (D)
▌Guam: Vicente T. Blaz (R)
▌Puerto Rico: Jaime Fuster (Resident Commissioner) (PPD), until March 3, 1992

▌Antonio Colorado (PPD) from March 4, 1992

▌Virgin Islands: Ron de Lugo (D)

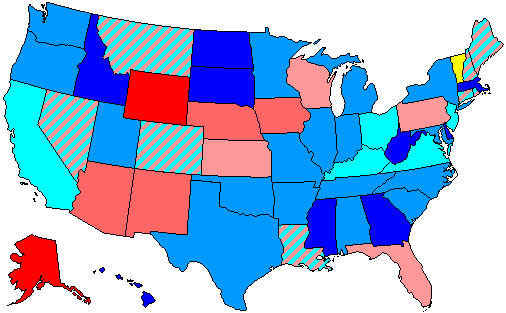
House seats by party holding majority in state: 80+ -100% Republican / 80+ -100% Democratic; 60+ -80% Republican / 60+ -80% Democratic; 50+ -60% Republican / 50+ -60% Democratic; striped: evenly split / / 100% independent

House majority leadership

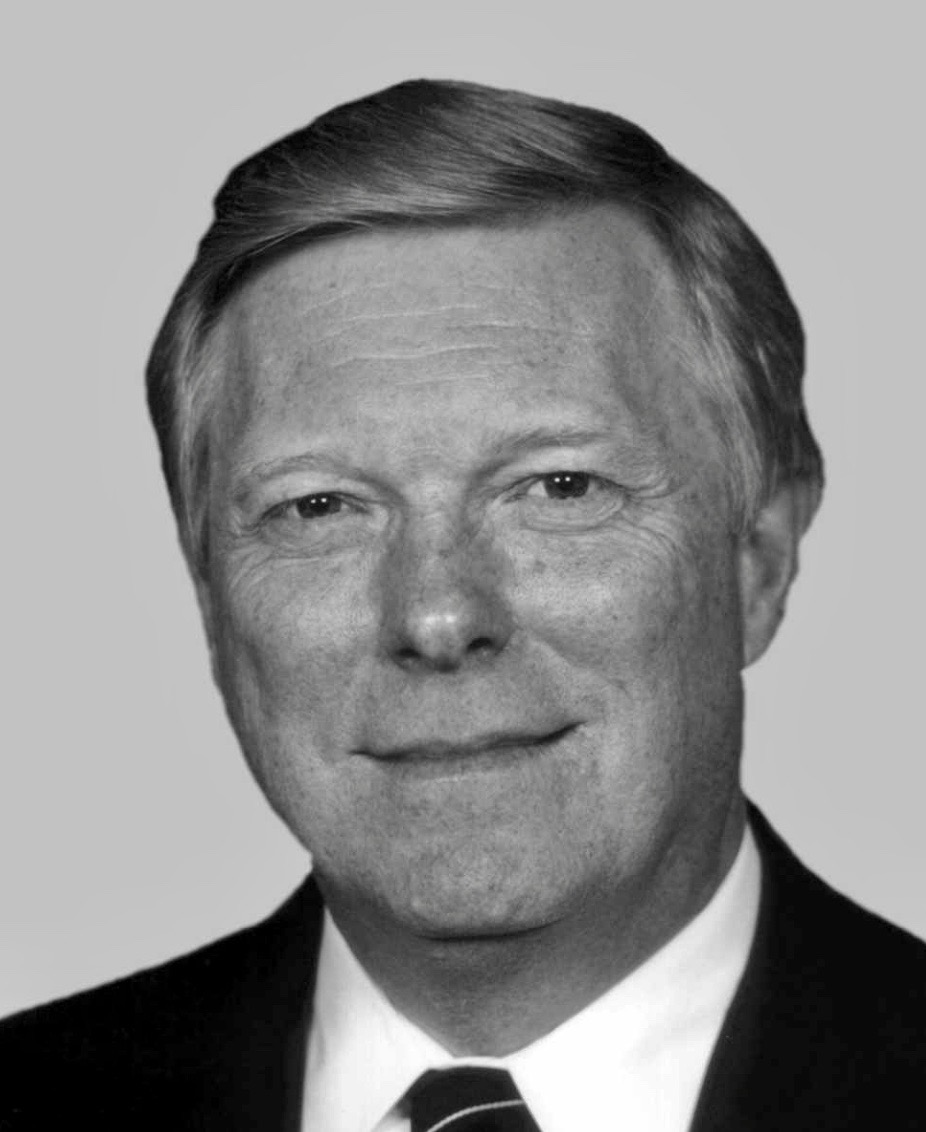
Democratic leader
Dick Gephardt

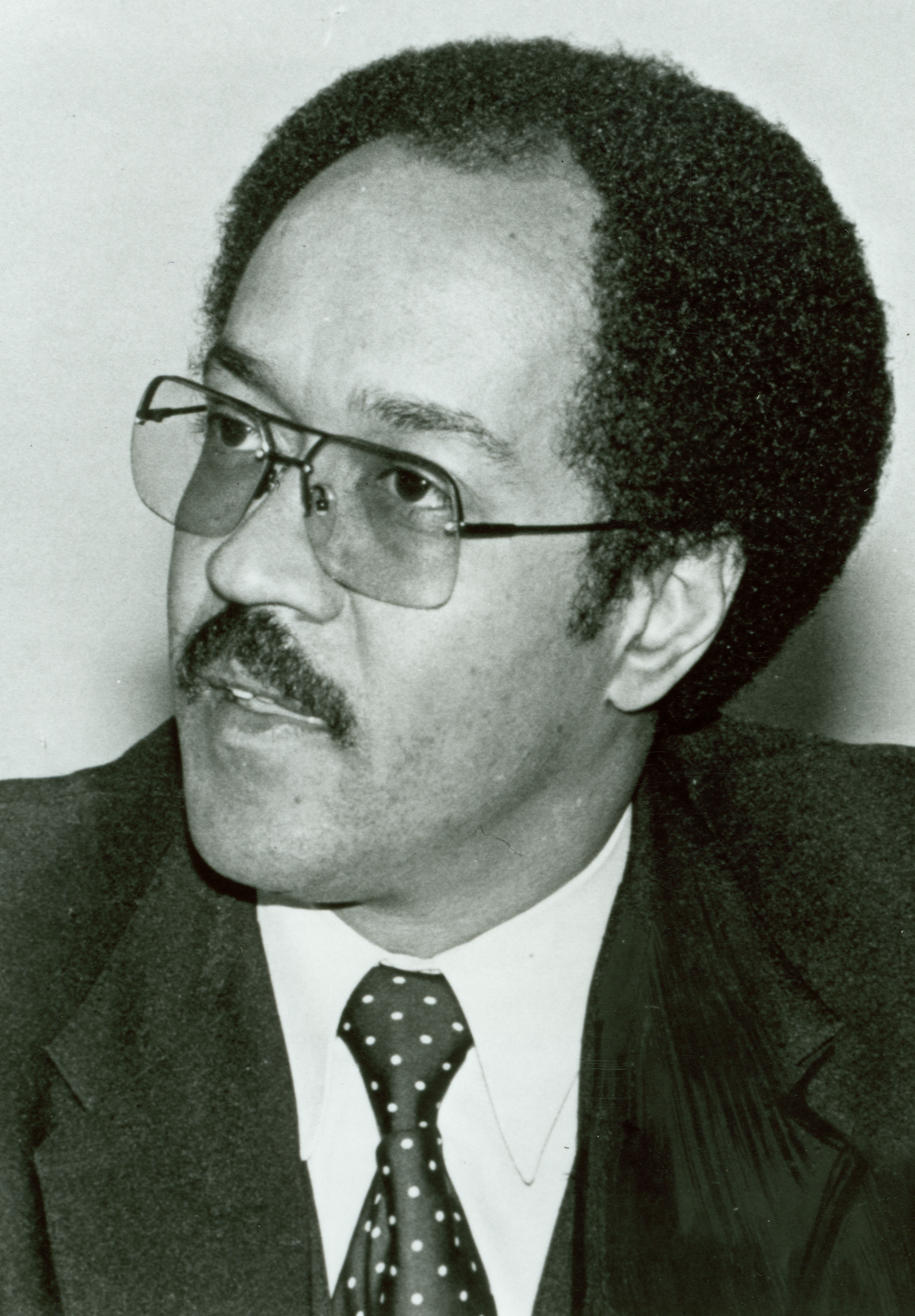
Democratic whip (until September 11, 1991)
Bill Gray

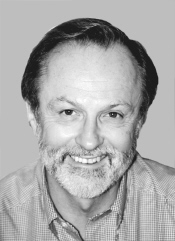
Democratic whip (after September 11, 1991)
David Bonior

House minority leadership

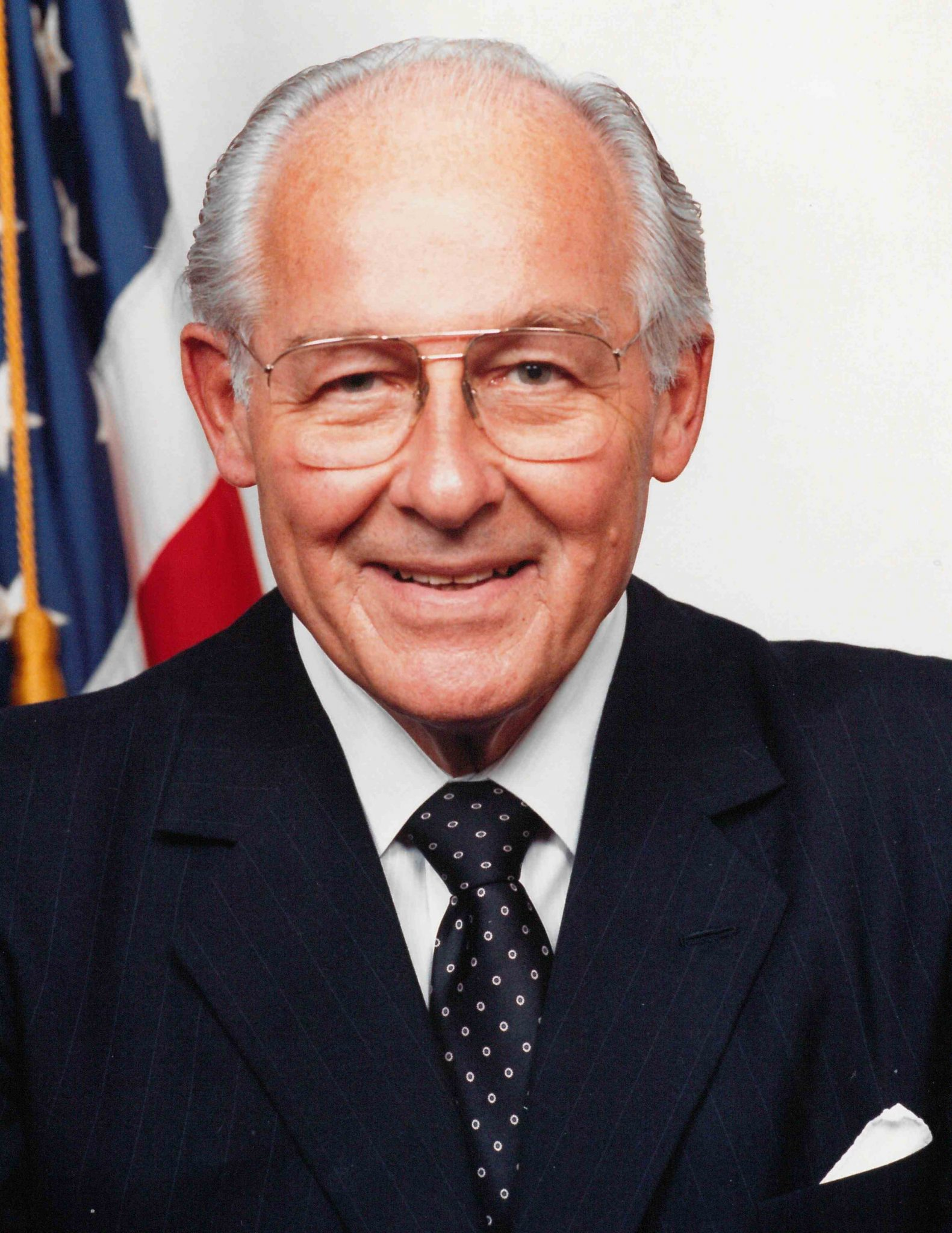
Republican leader
Bob Michel

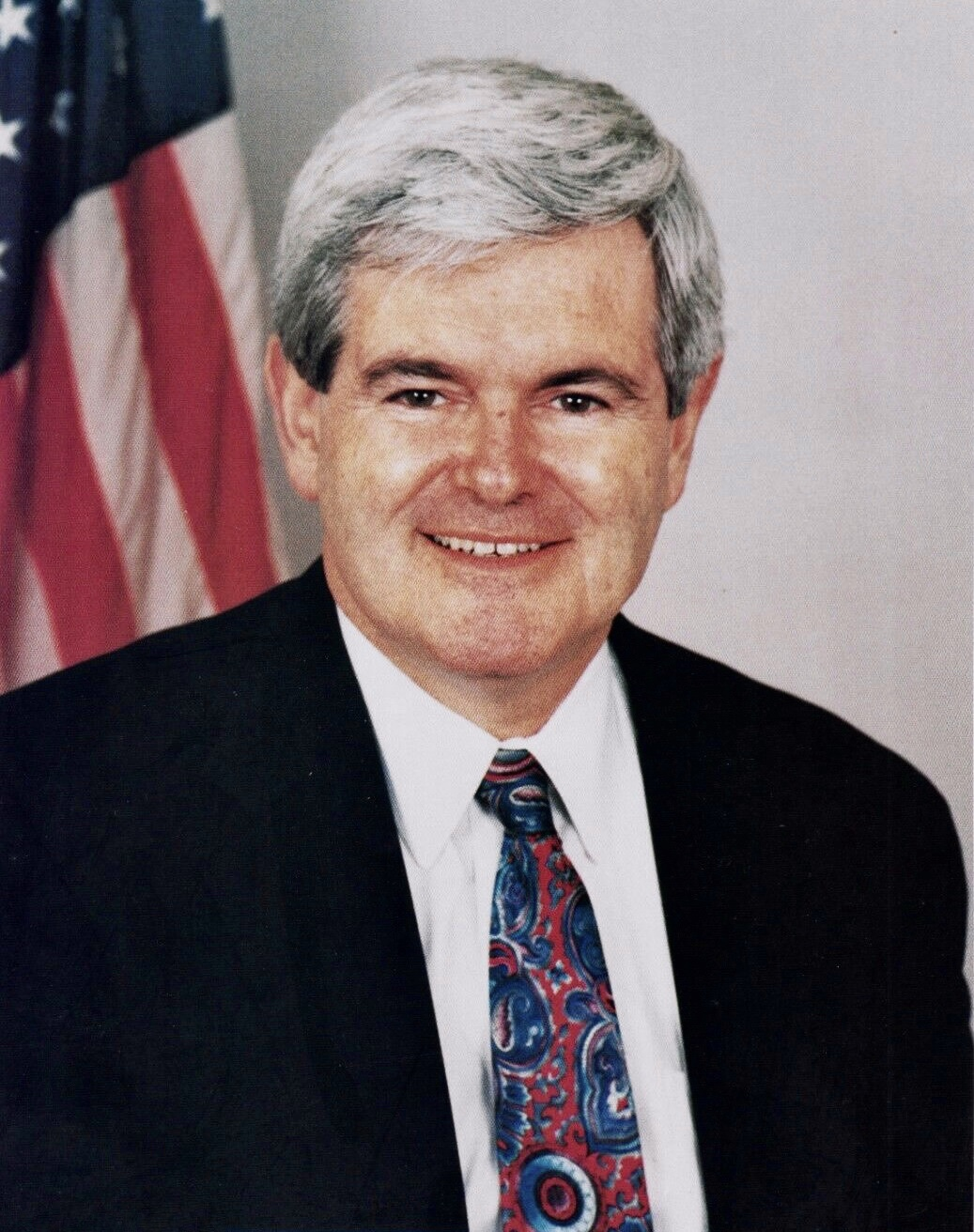
Republican whip
Newt Gingrich

== Changes in membership ==
=== Senate ===
Senate changes
State (class)	Vacated by	Reason for change	Successor	Date of successor's formal installation (Note: When seated or oath administered, not necessarily when service began.)
California (1)	Pete Wilson (R)	Resigned January 7, 1991, after being elected Governor of California. As Governor, he appointed his successor.	John Seymour (R)	January 10, 1991
Pennsylvania (1)	John Heinz (R)	Died April 4, 1991. Successor was appointed May 9, 1991, to continue the term. Appointee was later elected to finish the term ending January 3, 1995.	Harris Wofford (D)	May 9, 1991
North Dakota (1)	Quentin Burdick (D-NPL)	Died September 8, 1992. His wife was appointed the same day to succeed him.	Jocelyn Burdick (D-NPL)	September 12, 1992
California (1)	John Seymour (R)	Interim appointee lost special election to finish the term. Successor elected on November 3, 1992 to finish the term ending January 3, 1995.	Dianne Feinstein (D)	November 10, 1992
North Dakota (1)	Jocelyn Burdick (D-NPL)	Interim appointee retired December 14, 1992. Her successor was chosen at a special election December 4, 1992 to finish the term ending January 3, 1995.	Kent Conrad (D-NPL)	December 14, 1992
North Dakota (3)	Kent Conrad (D-NPL)	Resigned December 14, 1992, to assume vacant Class 1 seat to which he was elected. His successor was appointed to assume the seat early, having already won election to the next term.	Byron Dorgan (D-NPL)	December 15, 1992
Tennessee (2)	Al Gore (D)	Resigned January 2, 1993, to become Vice President of the United States. His successor was appointed to finish the term.	Harlan Mathews (D)	January 2, 1993

=== House of Representatives ===
House changes
District	Vacated by	Reason for change	Successor	Date of successor's formal installation
Massachusetts's 1st	Silvio O. Conte (R)	Died February 11, 1991	John Olver (D)	June 18, 1991
Illinois's 15th	Edward Rell Madigan (R)	Resigned March 8, 1991, after being appointed U.S. Secretary of Agriculture	Thomas W. Ewing (R)	July 2, 1991
Texas's 3rd	Steve Bartlett (R)	Resigned March 11, 1991, after being elected Mayor of Dallas	Sam Johnson (R)	May 18, 1991
Arizona's 2nd	Mo Udall (D)	Resigned May 4, 1991, due to worsening Parkinson's disease	Ed Pastor (D)	September 24, 1991
Pennsylvania's 2nd	William H. Gray III (D)	Resigned September 11, 1991 to become President of the Negro College Fund	Lucien Blackwell (D)	November 5, 1991
Virginia's 7th	D. French Slaughter Jr. (R)	Resigned November 5, 1991 following a series of strokes	George Allen (R)	November 5, 1991
Puerto Rico's at-large	Jaime Fuster (PPD)	Resigned March 3, 1992	Antonio Colorado (PPD)	March 4, 1992
New York's 17th	Theodore S. Weiss (D)	Died September 14, 1992	Jerry Nadler (D)	November 3, 1992
North Carolina's 1st	Walter B. Jones Sr. (D)	Died September 15, 1992	Eva Clayton (D)	November 3, 1992
North Dakota's at-large	Byron Dorgan (D-NPL)	Resigned December 14, 1992, after being appointed US Senator	Vacant	Not filled this term

== Committees ==
Lists of committees and their party leaders for members of the House and Senate committees can be found through the Official Congressional Directory at the bottom of this article. The directory after the pages of terms of service lists committees of the Senate, House (Standing with Subcommittees, Select and Special) and Joint and, after that, House/Senate committee assignments. On the committees section of the House and Senate in the Official Congressional Directory, the committee's members on the first row on the left side shows the chairman of the committee and on the right side shows the ranking member of the committee.

=== Senate ===
- Aging (Special) (Chair: David Pryor; Ranking Member: William S. Cohen)
- Agriculture, Nutrition and Forestry (Chair: Patrick Leahy; Ranking Member: Richard G. Lugar)
  - Agricultural Credit (Chair: Kent Conrad; Ranking Member: Chuck Grassley)
  - Agricultural Production and Stabilization of Prices (Chair: David Pryor; Ranking Member: Jesse Helms)
  - Agricultural Research and General Legislation (Chair: Tom Daschle; Ranking Member: John Seymour)
  - Conservation and Forestry (Chair: Wyche Fowler; Ranking Member: Larry E. Craig)
  - Domestic and Foreign Marketing and Product Promotion (Chair: David L. Boren; Ranking Member: Thad Cochran)
  - Nutrition and Investigations (Chair: Tom Harkin; Ranking Member: Mitch McConnell)
  - Rural Development and Rural Electrification (Chair: Howell T. Heflin; Ranking Member: Thad Cochran)
- Appropriations (Chair: Robert Byrd; Ranking Member: Mark O. Hatfield)
  - Agriculture, Rural Development and Related Agencies (Chair: Quentin N. Burdick; Ranking Member: Thad Cochran)
  - Commerce, Justice, State and Judiciary (Chair: Ernest F. Hollings; Ranking Member: Warren Rudman)
  - Defense (Chair: Daniel Inouye; Ranking Member: Ted Stevens)
  - District of Columbia (Chair: Brock Adams; Ranking Member: Kit Bond)
  - Energy and Water Development (Chair: J. Bennett Johnston; Ranking Member: Mark O. Hatfield)
  - Foreign Operations (Chair: Patrick Leahy; Ranking Member: Bob Kasten)
  - VA-HUD Independent Agencies (Chair: Barbara A. Mikulski; Ranking Member: Jake Garn)
  - Interior and Related Agencies (Chair: Robert C. Byrd; Ranking Member: Don Nickles)
  - Labor, Health, Human Services, Education and Related Agencies (Chair: Tom Harkin; Ranking Member: Arlen Specter)
  - Legislative Branch (Chair: Harry Reid; Ranking Member: Slade Gorton)
  - Military Construction (Chair: Jim Sasser; Ranking Member: Phil Gramm)
  - Transportation and Related Agencies (Chair: Frank Lautenberg; Ranking Member: Al D'Amato)
  - Treasury, Postal Service and General Government (Chair: Dennis DeConcini; Ranking Member: Pete Domenici)
- Armed Services (Chair: Sam Nunn; Ranking Member: John Warner)
  - Strategic Forces and Nuclear Detterence (Chair: J. James Exon; Ranking Member: Strom Thurmond)
  - Conventional Forces and Alliance Defense (Chair: Carl Levin; Ranking Member: Malcolm Wallop)
  - Projection Forces and Regional Defense (Chair: Ted Kennedy; Ranking Member: William Cohen)
  - Defense Industry and Technology (Chair: Jeff Bingaman; Ranking Member: Dan Coats)
  - Readiness, Sustainability and Support (Chair: Alan J. Dixon; Ranking Member: Trent Lott)
  - Manpower and Personnel (Chair: John Glenn; Ranking Member: John McCain)
- Banking, Housing and Urban Affairs (Chair: Donald W. Riegle Jr.; Ranking Member: Jake Garn)
  - Housing and Urban Affairs (Chair: Alan Cranston; Ranking Member: Al D'Amato)
  - International Finance and Monetary Policy (Chair: Paul Sarbanes; Ranking Member: Phil Gramm)
  - Securities (Chair: Chris Dodd; Ranking Member: Nancy Kassebaum)
  - Consumer and Regulatory Affairs (Chair: Alan J. Dixon; Ranking Member: Kit Bond)
- Budget (Chair: Jim Sasser; Ranking Member: Pete Domenici)
- Commerce, Science and Transportation (Chair: Ernest Hollings; Ranking Member: John C. Danforth)
  - Aviation (Chair: Wendell H. Ford; Ranking Member: Bob Packwood)
  - Communications (Chair: Daniel K. Inouye; Ranking Member: Bob Packwood)
  - Consumer (Chair: Richard Bryan; Ranking Member: Slade Gorton)
  - Foreign Commerce and Tourism (Chair: Jay Rockefeller; Ranking Member: Conrad Burns)
  - Merchant Marine (Chair: John Breaux; Ranking Member: Trent Lott)
  - Science, Technology and Space (Chair: Albert Gore; Ranking Member: Larry Pressler)
  - Surface Transportation (Chair: J. James Exon; Ranking Member: Bob Kasten)
  - National Ocean Policy Study (Chair: Ernest F. Hollings; Ranking Member: Ted Stevens)
- Energy and Natural Resources (Chair: J. Bennett Johnston; Ranking Member: Malcolm Wallop)
  - Energy Regulation and Conservation (Chair: Tim Wirth; Ranking Member: Don Nickles)
  - Energy Research and Development (Chair: Wendell H. Ford; Ranking Member: Pete Domenici)
  - Mineral Resources Development and Production (Chair: Jeff Bingaman; Ranking Member: Larry E. Craig)
  - Public Lands, National Parks and Forests (Chair: Dale Bumpers; Ranking Member: Frank H. Murkowski)
  - Water and Power (Chair: Bill Bradley; Ranking Member: Conrad Burns)
- Environment and Public Works (Chair: Quentin N. Burdick, then Daniel Patrick Moynihan; Ranking Member: John H. Chafee)
  - Environment Protection (Chair: Max Baucus; Ranking Member: John H. Chafee)
  - Nuclear Regulation (Chair: Bob Graham; Ranking Member: Alan K. Simpson)
  - Superfund, Ocean and Water Protection (Chair: Frank Lautenberg; Ranking Member: David Durenberger)
  - Toxic Substances, Environmental Oversight, Research and Development (Chair: Harry Reid; Ranking Member: John W. Warner)
  - Water Resources, Transportation and Infrastructure (Chair: Daniel Moynihan; Ranking Member: Steve Symms)
- Ethics (Select) (Chair: Howell Heflin, then Terry Sanford; Ranking Member: Warren B. Rudman)
- Finance (Chair: Lloyd Bentsen; Ranking Member: Bob Packwood)
  - Deficits, Debt Management and International Debt (Chair: Bill Bradley; Ranking Member: Chuck Grassley)
  - Energy and Agricultural Taxation (Chair: Tom Daschle; Ranking Member: Steve Symms)
  - Health for Families and the Uninsured (Chair: Donald W. Riegle; Ranking Member: John H. Chafee)
  - International Trade (Chair: Max Baucus; Ranking Member: John C. Danforth)
  - Medicare and Long Term Care (Chair: Jay Rockefeller; Ranking Member: David Durenberger)
  - Private Retirement Plans and Oversight of the Internal Revenue Service (Chair: David Pryor; Ranking Member: Chuck Grassley)
  - Social Security and Family Policy (Chair: Daniel Moynihan; Ranking Member: Bob Dole)
  - Taxation (Chair: David L. Boren; Ranking Member: William V. Roth Jr.)
- Foreign Relations (Chair: Claiborne Pell; Ranking Member: Jesse Helms)
  - European Affairs (Chair: Joe Biden; Ranking Member: Larry Pressler)
  - International Economic Policy, Trade, Oceans and Environment (Chair: Paul Sarbanes; Ranking Member: Mitch McConnell)
  - East Asian and Pacific Affairs (Chair: Alan Cranston; Ranking Member: Frank H. Murkowski)
  - Western Hemisphere and Peace Corps Affairs (Chair: Chris Dodd; Ranking Member: Richard Lugar)
  - Terrorism, Narcotics and International Communications (Chair: John Kerry; Ranking Member: Hank Brown)
  - African Affairs (Chair: Paul Simon; Ranking Member: Nancy Kassebaum)
  - Near Eastern and South Asian Affairs (Chair: Terry Sanford; Ranking Member: Orrin Hatch)
- Governmental Affairs (Chair: John Glenn; Ranking Member: William V. Roth Jr.)
  - Federal Services, Post Office and Civil Service (Chair: David Pryor; Ranking Member: Ted Stevens)
  - General Services, Federalism and the District of Columbia (Chair: Jim Sasser; Ranking Member: John Seymour)
  - Government Information and Regulation (Chair: Herb Kohl; Ranking Member: Warren Rudman)
  - Oversight of Government Management (Chair: Carl Levin; Ranking Member: William S. Cohen)
  - Permanent Subcommittee on Investigations (Chair: Sam Nunn; Ranking Member: William V. Roth Jr.)
- Indian Affairs (Select) (Chair: Daniel Inouye; Ranking Member: John McCain)
- Judiciary (Chair: Joe Biden; Ranking Member: Strom Thurmond)
  - Antitrust, Monopolies and Business Rights (Chair: Howard Metzenbaum; Ranking Member: Arlen Specter)
  - Constitution (Chair: Paul Simon; Ranking Member: Arlen Specter)
  - Courts and Administration Practice (Chair: Howell T. Heflin; Ranking Member: Chuck Grassley)
  - Immigration and Refugee Affairs (Chair: Ted Kennedy; Ranking Member: Alan K. Simpson)
  - Patents, Copyrights and Trademarks (Chair: Dennis DeConcini; Ranking Member: Orrin Hatch)
  - Technology and the Law (Chair: Patrick Leahy; Ranking Member: Hank Brown)
  - Juvenile Justice (Chair: Herb Kohl; Ranking Member: Hank Brown)
- Intelligence (Select) (Chair: David L. Boren; Ranking Member: Frank H. Murkowski)
- Labor and Human Resources (Chair: Ted Kennedy; Ranking Member: Orrin Hatch)
  - Aging (Chair: Brock Adams; Ranking Member: Thad Cochran)
  - Children, Family, Drugs and Alcoholism (Chair: Chris Dodd; Ranking Member: Dan Coats)
  - Education, Arts and Humanities (Chair: Claiborne Pell; Ranking Member: Nancy Kassebaum)
  - Employment and Productivity (Chair: Paul Simon; Ranking Member: Strom Thurmond)
  - Disability Policy (Chair: Tom Harkin; Ranking Member: David Durenberger)
  - Labor (Chair: Howard M. Metzenbaum; Ranking Member: Jim Jeffords)
- POW/MIA Affairs (Select) (Chair: John Kerry; Ranking Member: )
- Rules and Administration (Chair: Wendell H. Ford; Ranking Member: Ted Stevens)
- Small Business (Chair: Dale Bumpers; Ranking Member: Bob Kasten)
  - Competitiveness and Economic Productivity (Chair: Joe Lieberman; Ranking Member: Connie Mack III)
  - Export Expansion (Chair: Barbara Mikulski; Ranking Member: Larry Pressler)
  - Government Contracting and Paperwork Reduction (Chair: Alan J. Dixon; Ranking Member: Kit Bond)
  - Innovation, Technology and Productivity (Chair: Carl Levin; Ranking Member: Ted Stevens)
  - Rural Economy and Family Farming (Chair: Max Baucus; Ranking Member: Bob Kasten)
  - Urban and Minority-Owned Business Development (Chair: John Kerry; Ranking Member: Conrad Burns)
- Veterans' Affairs (Chair: Alan Cranston; Ranking Member: Arlen Specter)

=== House of Representatives ===
- Aging (Select) (Chair: Edward Roybal; Ranking Member: Matthew J. Rinaldo)
- Agriculture (Chair: Kika de la Garza; Ranking Member: E. Thomas Coleman)
  - Cotton, Rice and Sugar (Chair: Jerry Huckaby; Ranking Member: Bill Emerson)
  - Livestock, Dairy and Poultry (Chair: Charles W. Stenholm; Ranking Member: Steve Gunderson)
  - Peanuts and Tobacco (Chair: Charles Hatcher; Ranking Member: Larry Hopkins)
  - Wheat, Soybeans and Feed Grains (Chair: Dan Glickman; Ranking Member: Ron Marlenee)
  - Conservation, Credit and Rural Development (Chair: Glenn English; Ranking Member: E. Thomas Coleman)
  - Department Operations, Research and Foreign Agriculture (Chair: Charlie Rose; Ranking Member: Pat Roberts)
  - Domestic Marketing, Consumer Relations and Nutrition (Chair: Robin Tallon; Ranking Member: Tom Lewis)
  - Forests, Family Farms and Energy (Chair: Harold Volkmer; Ranking Member: Sid Morrison)
- Appropriations (Chair: Jamie L. Whitten; Ranking Member: Joseph M. McDade)
  - Commerce, Justice, State and the Judiciary (Chair: Neal Edward Smith; Ranking Member: Hal Rogers)
  - Defense (Chair: John Murtha; Ranking Member: Joseph M. McDade)
  - District of Columbia (Chair: Julian C. Dixon; Ranking Member: Dean Gallo)
  - Energy and Water Development (Chair: Tom Bevill; Ranking Member: John T. Myers)
  - Foreign Operations, Export Financing and Related Programs (Chair: Dave Obey; Ranking Member: Mickey Edwards)
  - Interior and Related Agencies (Chair: Sidney Yates; Ranking Member: Ralph Regula)
  - Labor, Health, Human Services, Education and Related Agencies (Chair: William Natcher; Ranking Member: Carl D. Pursell)
  - Legislative (Chair: Vic Fazio; Ranking Member: Jerry Lewis)
  - Military Construction (Chair: Bill Hefner; Ranking Member: Bill Lowery)
  - Agriculture, Rural Development and Related Agencies (Chair: Jamie L. Whitten; Ranking Member: Joe Skeen)
  - Transportation (Chair: William Lehman; Ranking Member: Lawrence Coughlin)
  - Treasury, Postal Service and General Government (Chair: Edward Roybal; Ranking Member: Frank R. Wolf)
  - VA, HUD and Independent Agencies (Chair: J. Bob Traxler; Ranking Member: Bill Green)
- Armed Services (Chair: Les Aspin; Ranking Member: William L. Dickinson)
  - Procurement and Military Nuclear Systems (Chair: Les Aspin; Ranking Member: William L. Dickinson)
  - Seapower, Strategic and Critical Materials (Chair: Charles E. Bennett; Ranking Member: Floyd Spence)
  - Research and Development (Chair: Ron Dellums; Ranking Member: Robert W. Davis)
  - Military Installations and Facilities (Chair: Patricia Schroder; Ranking Member: David O'B. Martin)
  - Military Personnel and Compensation (Chair: Beverly Byron; Ranking Member: Herbert H. Bateman)
  - Investigations (Chair: Nicholas Mavroules; Ranking Member: Larry J. Hopkins)
  - Readiness (Chair: Earl Hutto; Ranking Member: John R. Kasich)
- Banking, Finance and Urban Affairs (Chair: Henry B. Gonzalez; Ranking Member: Chalmers P. Wylie)
  - Housing and Community Development (Chair: Henry B. Gonzalez; Ranking Member: Marge Roukema)
  - Financial Institutions Supervision, Regulation and Insurance (Chair: Frank Annunzio; Ranking Member: Chalmers P. Wylie)
  - Domestic Monetary Policy (Chair: Stephen L. Neal; Ranking Member: Toby Roth)
  - General Oversight and Investigations (Chair: Carroll Hubbard; Ranking Member: Bill McCollum)
  - International Development, Finance, Trade and Monetary Policy (Chair: Carroll Hubbard; Ranking Member: Jim Leach)
  - Policy Research and Insurance (Chair: Ben Erdreich; Ranking Member: Doug Bereuter)
  - Economic Stabilization (Chair: Thomas R. Carper; Ranking Member: Tom Ridge)
  - Consumer Affairs and Coinage (Chair: Esteban Edward Torres; Ranking Member: Chalmers P. Wylie)
- Budget (Chair: Leon Panetta; Ranking Member: Willis D. Gradison Jr.)
  - Budget Process, Reconciliation and Enforcement (Chair: Anthony Beilenson)
  - Community Development and Natural Resources (Chair: Mike Espy)
  - Defense, Foreign Policy and Space (Chair: Richard J. Durbin)
  - Urgent Fiscal Issues (Chair: Frank Guarini)
  - Human Resources (Chair: Jim Oberstar)
  - Economic Policy, Projections and Revenues (Chair: Dale Kildee)
- Children, Youth and Families (Select) (Chair: Patricia Schroeder; Ranking Member: Frank R. Wolf)
- District of Columbia (Chair: Ron Dellums; Ranking Member: Thomas J. Bliley Jr.)
  - Fiscal Affairs and Health (Chair: Pete Stark; Ranking Member: Dana Rohrabacher)
  - Government Operations and Metropolitan Affairs (Chair: Alan Wheat; Ranking Member: Larry Combest)
  - Judiciary and Education (Chair: Mervyn M. Dymally; Ranking Member: Bill Lowery)
- Education and Labor (Chair: William D. Ford; Ranking Member: Bill Goodling)
  - Postsecondary Education (Chair: William D. Ford; Ranking Member: E. Thomas Coleman)
  - Health and Safety (Chair: Joseph M. Gaydos; Ranking Member: Paul B. Henry)
  - Labor Standards (Chair: Austin J. Murphy; Ranking Member: Tom Petri)
  - Elementary, Secondary and Vocational Education (Chair: Dale Kildee; Ranking Member: Bill Goodling)
  - Labor-Management Relations (Chair: Pat Williams; Ranking Member: Marge Roukema)
  - Human Resources (Chair: Matthew G. Martinez; Ranking Member: Harris W. Fawell)
  - Select Education (Chair: Major R. Owens; Ranking Member: Cass Ballenger)
  - Employment Opportunities (Chair: Carl C. Perkins; Ranking Member: Steve Gunderson)
- Energy and Commerce (Chair: John Dingell; Ranking Member: Norman F. Lent)
  - Oversight and Investigations (Chair: John Dingell; Ranking Member: Thomas J. Bliley)
  - Health and the Environment (Chair: Henry Waxman; Ranking Member: William E. Dannemeyer)
  - Energy and Power (Chair: Phil Sharp; Ranking Member: Carlos J. Moorhead)
  - Commerce, Transportation and Competitiveness (Chair: Cardiss Collins; Ranking Member: J. Alex McMillan)
  - Telecommunications and Finance (Chair: Ed Markey; Ranking Member: Matthew J. Rinaldo)
  - Transportation and Hazardous Materials (Chair: Al Swift; Ranking Member: Don Ritter)
- Foreign Affairs (Chair: Dante Fascell; Ranking Member: William S. Broomfield)
  - Arms Control, International Security and Science (Chair: Dante Fascell; Ranking Member: William S. Broomfield)
  - Europe and the Middle East (Chair: Lee Hamilton; Ranking Member: Benjamin A. Gilman)
  - Human Rights and International Organizations (Chair: Gus Yatron; Ranking Member: Doug Bereuter)
  - Asian and Pacific Affairs (Chair: Stephen Solarz; Ranking Member: Jim Leach)
  - International Economic Policy and Trade (Chair: Sam Gejdenson; Ranking Member: Toby Roth)
  - Africa (Chair: Mervyn M. Dymally; Ranking Member: Dan Burton)
  - Western Hemisphere Affairs (Chair: Robert Torricelli; Ranking Member: Robert J. Lagomarsino)
  - International Operations (Chair: Howard Berman; Ranking Member: Olympia Snowe)
- Government Operations (Chair: John Conyers; Ranking Member: Frank Horton)
  - Legislation and National Security (Chair: John Conyers; Frank Horton)
  - Human Resources and Intergovernmental Relations (Chair: Theodore Weiss; Ranking Member: Craig L. Thomas)
  - Environment, Energy and Natural Resources (Chair: Mike Synar; Ranking Member: William F. Clinger Jr.)
  - Commerce, Consumer and Monetary Affairs (Chair: Doug Barnard; Ranking Member: Dennis Hastert)
  - Employment and Housing (Chair: Tom Lantos; Ranking Member: Ileana Ros-Lehtinen)
  - Government Information, Justice and Agriculture (Chair: Bob Wise; Ranking Member: Al McCandless)
  - Government Activities and Transportation (Chair: Barbara Boxer; Ranking Member: Christopher Cox)
- House Administration (Chair: Charlie Rose; Ranking Member: Bill Thomas)
  - Procurement and Printing (Chair: Frank Annunzio; Ranking Member: Mickey Edwards)
  - Accounts (Chair: Joseph M. Gaydos; Ranking Member: Paul E. Gillmor)
  - Elections (Chair: Al Swift; Ranking Member: Bob Livingston)
  - Personnel and Police (Chair: Mary Rose Oakar; Ranking Member: Pat Roberts)
  - Libraries and Memorials (Chair: Bill Clay; Ranking Member: Bill Barrett)
  - Office Systems (Chair: Sam Gejdenson; Ranking Member: James T. Walsh)
  - Campaign Finance Reform Task Force (Chair: Sam Gejdenson; Ranking Member: Bill Thomas)
- Hunger (Select) (Chair: Tony P. Hall; Ranking Member: Bill Emerson)
- Interior and Insular Affairs (Chair: George Miller; Ranking Member: Don Young)
  - Water and Power Resources and Offshore Energy Resources (Chair: George Miller; Ranking Member: James V. Hansen)
  - Mining and Natural Resources (Chair: Nick Rahall; Ranking Member: Barbara F. Vucanovich)
  - National Parks and Public Lands (Chair: Bruce Vento; Ranking Member: Ron Marlenee)
  - Insular and International Affairs (Chair: Ron de Lugo; Ranking Member: Robert J. Lagomarsino)
  - Energy and the Environment (Chair: Peter H. Kostmayer; Ranking Member: John J. Rhodes III)
  - General Oversight, Northwest Power and Forest Management (Chair: Richard H. Lehman; Ranking Member: Ben Blaz)
- Judiciary (Chair: Jack Brooks; Ranking Member: Hamilton Fish IV)
  - Economic and Commercial Law (Chair: Jack Brooks; Ranking Member: Hamilton Fish IV)
  - Civil and Constitutional Rights (Chair: Don Edwards; Ranking Member: Henry Hyde)
  - International Law, Immigration and Refugees (Chair: Romano L. Mazzoli; Ranking Member: Bill McCollum)
  - Intellectual Property and Judicial Administration (Chair: William J. Hughes; Ranking Member: Carlos J. Moorhead)
  - Administration Law and Governmental Relations (Chair: Barney Frank; Ranking Member: George W. Gekas)
  - Crime and Criminal Justice (Chair: Chuck Schumer; Ranking Member: James Sensenbrenner)
- Merchant Marine and Fisheries (Chair: Walter B. Jones Sr.; Ranking Member: Robert W. Davis)
  - Merchant Marine (Chair: Walter B. Jones Sr.; Ranking Member: Norman F. Lent)
  - Fisheries, Wildlife Conservation and the Environment (Chair: Gerry Studds; Ranking Member: Don Young)
  - Coast Guard and Navigation (Chair: Billy Tauzin; Ranking Member: Jack Fields)
  - Oceanography, Great Lakes and the Outer Continental Shelf (Chair: Dennis Hertel; Ranking Member: Herbert H. Bateman)
  - Oversight and Investigations (Chair: Bill Lipinski; Ranking Member: Jim Saxton)
- Narcotics Abuse and Control (Select) (Chair: Charles B. Rangel; Ranking Member: Lawrence Coughlin)
- Post Office and Civil Service (Chair: Bill Clay; Ranking Member: Benjamin A. Gilman)
  - Investigations (Chair: Bill Clay; Ranking Member: Rod Chandler)
  - Civil Service (Chair: Gerry Sikorski; Ranking Member: Connie Morella)
  - Postal Operations and Services (Chair: Frank McCloskey; Ranking Member: Frank Horton)
  - Compensation and Employee Benefits (Chair: Gary L. Ackerman; Ranking Member: John T. Myers)
  - Census and Population (Chair: Thomas C. Sawyer; Ranking Member: Tom Ridge)
  - Human Resources (Chair: Paul E. Kanjorski; Ranking Member: Dan Burton)
  - Postal Personnel and Modernization (Chair: Charles A. Hayes; Ranking Member: Don Young)
- Public Works and Transportation (Chair: Robert A. Roe; Ranking Member: John Paul Hammerschmidt)
  - Aviation (Chair: Jim Oberstar; Ranking Member: William F. Clinger)
  - Economic Development (Chair: Joe Kolter; Ranking Member: Helen Delich Bentley)
  - Investigations and Oversight (Chair: Robert Borski; Ranking Member: Ron Packard)
  - Public Buildings and Grounds (Chair: Gus Savage; Ranking Member: Jim Inhofe)
  - Surface Transportation (Chair: Norman Mineta; Ranking Member: Bud Shuster)
  - Water Resources (Chair: Henry Nowak; Ranking Member: Tom Petri)
- Rules (Chair: Joe Moakley; Ranking Member: Gerald B. H. Solomon)
  - Rules of the House (Chair: Anthony C. Beilenson; Ranking Member: David Dreier)
  - The Legislative Process (Chair: Butler Derrick; Ranking Member: Jimmy Quillen)
- Science, Space and Technology (Chair: George Brown Jr.; Ranking Member: Robert S. Walker)
  - Environment (Chair: James H. Scheuer; Ranking Member: Don Ritter)
  - Energy (Chair: Howard Wolpe; Ranking Member: Sid Morrison)
  - Investigations and Oversight (Chair: Howard Wolpe; Ranking Member: Sherwood Boehlert)
  - Space (Chair: Ralph M. Hall; Ranking Member: F. James Sensenbrenner)
  - Technology and Competitiveness (Chair: Tim Valentine; Ranking Member: Tom Lewis)
  - Science (Chair: Rick Boucher; Ranking Member: Ron Packard)
- Small Business (Chair: John J. LaFalce; Ranking Member: Andy Ireland)
  - SBA, the General Economy and Minority Enterprise Development (Chair: John J. LaFalce; Ranking Member: Andy Ireland)
  - Procurement, Tourism and Minority Enterprise Development (Chair: Ike Skelton; Ranking Member: D. French Slaughter)
  - Regulation, Business Opportunity and Energy (Chair: Ron Wyden; Ranking Member: Jan Meyers)
  - Antitrust, Impact of Deregulation and Privatization (Chair: Dennis E. Eckart; Ranking Member: Joel Hefley)
  - Exports, Tax Policy and Special Problems (Chair: Norman Sisisky; Ranking Member: Larry Combest)
  - Environment and Employment (Chair: Jim Olin; Ranking Member: Richard H. Baker)
- Standards of Official Conduct (Chair: Louis Stokes; Ranking Member: James V. Hansen)
- Veterans' Affairs (Chair: Gillespie V. Montgomery; Ranking Member: Bob Stump)
  - Hospitals and Health Care (Chair: Sonny Montgomery; Ranking Member: John Paul Hammerschmidt)
  - Compensation, Pension and Insurance (Chair: Douglas Applegate; Ranking Member: Bob Stump)
  - Oversight and Investigations (Chair: Lane Evans; Ranking Member: Michael Bilirakis)
  - Education, Training and Employment (Chair: Tim Penny; Ranking Member: Chris Smith)
  - Housing and Memorial Affairs (Chair: Harley O. Staggers; Ranking Member: Dan Burton)
- Ways and Means (Chair: Dan Rostenkowski; Ranking Member: Bill Archer)
  - Trade (Chair: Sam Gibbons; Ranking Member: Phil Crane)
  - Oversight (Chair: J.J. Pickle; Ranking Member: Richard T. Schulze)
  - Select Revenue Measures (Chair: Charles Rangel; Ranking Member: Guy Vander Jagt)
  - Health (Chair: Pete Stark; Ranking Member: Willis D. Gradison Jr.)
  - Social Security (Chair: Andrew Jacobs Jr.; Ranking Member: Phil Crane)
  - Human Resources (Chair: Harold Ford Sr.; Ranking Member: Richard T. Schulze)
- Whole

=== Joint committees ===
- Economic (Chair: Sen. Paul Sarbanes; Vice Chair: Rep. Lee H. Hamilton)
- Taxation (Chair: Rep. Dan Rostenkowski; Vice Chair: Sen. Lloyd Bentsen)
- The Library (Chair: Sen. Claiborne Pell; Vice Chair: Rep. Charlie Rose)
- Organization of Congress (Chair: N/A; Vice Chair: N/A)
- Printing (Chair: Rep. Charlie Rose; Vice Chair: Sen. Wendell H. Ford)

== Employees ==
=== Legislative branch agency directors ===
- Architect of the Capitol: George Malcolm White
- Attending Physician of the United States Congress: Robert Krasner
- Comptroller General of the United States: Charles A. Bowsher
- Director of the Congressional Budget Office: Robert D. Reischauer
- Librarian of Congress: James H. Billington
- Public Printer of the United States: Robert Houk

=== Senate ===
- Chaplain: Richard C. Halverson (Presbyterian)
- Curator: James R. Ketchum
- Historian: Richard A. Baker
- Parliamentarian: Alan Frumin
- Secretary: Walter J. Stewart
- Librarian: Roger K. Haley
- Secretary for the Majority: C. Abbott Saffold
- Secretary for the Minority: Howard O. Greene Jr.
- Sergeant at Arms: Martha S. Pope

=== House of Representatives ===
- Chaplain: James D. Ford (Lutheran)
- Clerk: Donnald K. Anderson
- Director of Non-Legislative and Financial Services: Leonard P. Wishart III, from October 1992
- Doorkeeper: James T. Molloy
- Historian: Ray Smock
- Parliamentarian: William H. Brown
- Postmaster: Robert V. Rota, until March 19, 1992
  - Michael J. Shinay, from March 31, 1992
- Reading Clerks: Meg Goetz (D) and Paul Hays (R)
- Sergeant at Arms: Jack Russ, until March 12, 1992
  - Werner W. Brandt, from March 12, 1992

== See also ==
- List of new members of the 102nd United States Congress
- 1990 United States elections (elections leading to this Congress)
  - 1990 United States Senate elections
  - 1990 United States House of Representatives elections
- 1992 United States elections (elections during this Congress, leading to the next Congress)
  - 1992 United States presidential election
  - 1992 United States Senate elections
  - 1992 United States House of Representatives elections
