= Mary Bain (disambiguation) =

Mary Bain (1904–1972) was an American chess master.

Mary Bain may also refer to:

- Mary Anderson Bain (1911–2006), American politician
- Mary Monnett Bain (1833–1885), American philanthropist
