= 1962 United States Senate election in Illinois =

- November 6, 1962
- Turnout: 72.66%
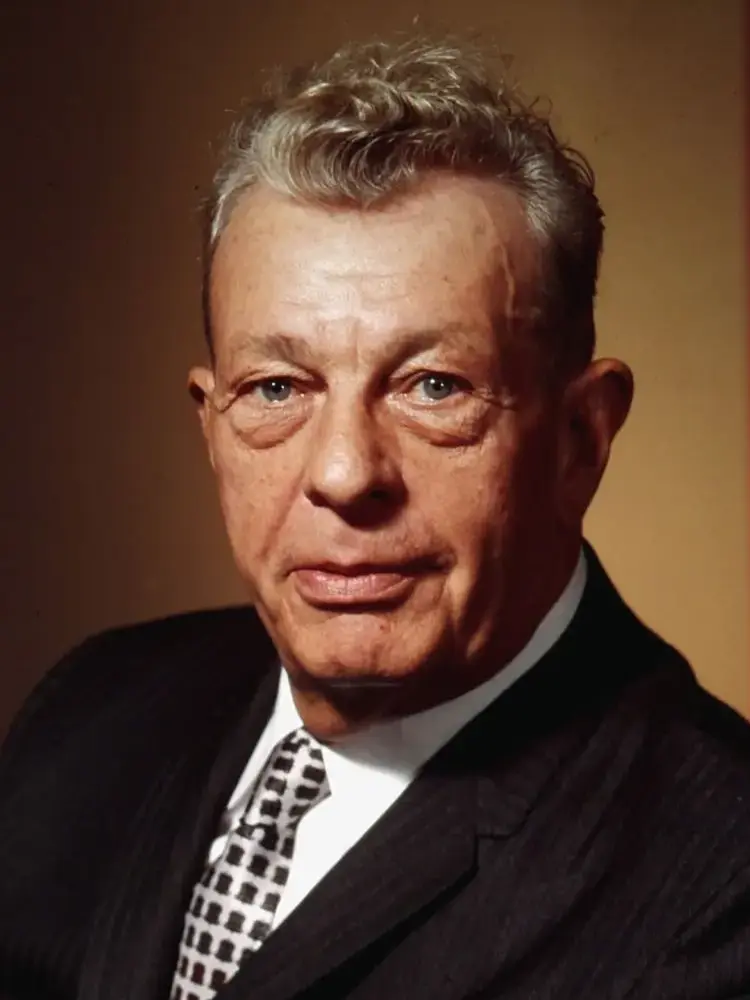

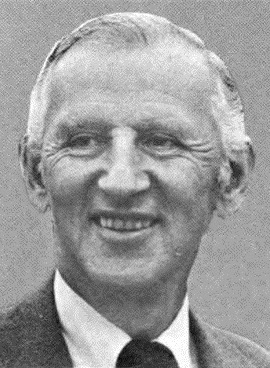
Nominee	Everett M. Dirksen	Sidney R. Yates
Party	Republican	Democratic
Popular vote	1,961,202	1,748,007
Percentage	52.87%	47.13%
- County results Dirksen: 50–60% 60–70% 70–80% Yates: 50–60% 60–70%
U.S. senator before election
Everett M. Dirksen
Republican
Elected U.S. Senator
Everett M. Dirksen
Republican

The 1962 United States Senate election in Illinois was held on November 6, 1962 to elect one of Illinois's members to the United States Senate. Incumbent Republican U.S. Senator and Minority Leader Everett Dirksen won re-election to his third term.

== Background ==
The primaries and general election coincided with those for congress and state elections.

Primaries were held on April 10.

Turnout in the primary elections was 33.36%, with a total of 1,815,849 votes cast.

Turnout during the general election was 72.66%, with 3,709,209 votes cast.

== Democratic primary ==
Democratic primary
Party	Candidate	Votes	%
Democratic	Sidney R. Yates	744,128	77.25
Democratic	Lar "America First" Daly	219,169	22.75
Write-in		3	0.00
Total votes		963,300	100

== Republican primary ==
Republican primary
Party	Candidate	Votes	%
Republican	Everett McKinley Dirksen (incumbent)	742,973	87.15
Republican	Harley D. Jones	109,574	12.85
Write-in		2	0.00
Total votes		852,549	100

== General election ==
Dirksen carried 86 of the state's 102 counties. Among the counties that Yates carried over Dirksen was the state's most populous county, Cook County, in which Yates won with 51.30% to Dirksen's 48.70%. 52.97% of all votes cast in the election were from Cook County. In the combined vote of the state's other 101 counties, Dirksen won 57.58% to Yates' 42.43%.

General election
Party	Candidate	Votes	%
Republican	Everett McKinley Dirksen (incumbent)	1,961,202	52.87
Democratic	Sidney R. Yates	1,748,007	47.13
Majority		213,195	5.74
Total votes		3,709,209	100
Republican hold			

== See also ==
- 1962 United States Senate elections
