= Weather Service Modernization Act of 1992 =

- Other short titles: NOAA Fleet Modernization Act; North Pacific Anadromous Stocks Act of 1992
- Long title: An Act to limit the authority of the Secretary of Commerce to close, consolidate, automate, or relocate any National Weather Service Office or National Weather Service Forecast Office, and for other purposes.
- Acronyms (colloquial): WSMA
- Nicknames: National Oceanic and Atmospheric Administration Authorization Act of 1992
- Enacted by: the 102nd United States Congress

Citations
- Public law: 102-567
- Statutes at Large: 106 Stat. 4270 aka 106 Stat. 4303

Codification
- Titles amended: 15 U.S.C.: Commerce and Trade
- U.S.C. sections amended: 15 U.S.C. ch. 9 § 313

Legislative history
- Introduced in the House as H.R. 2130 by Dennis M. Hertel (D-MI) on April 30, 1991; Committee consideration by House Merchant Marine and Fisheries, House Science, Space and Technology, House Interior and Insular Affairs, House Ways and Means; Passed the House on November 20, 1991 (Passed voice vote); Passed the Senate on August 12, 1992 (Passed voice vote) with amendment; House agreed to Senate amendment on October 6, 1992 (Agreed voice vote) with further amendment; Senate agreed to House amendment on October 7, 1992 (Agreed voice vote); Signed into law by President George H. W. Bush on October 29, 1992

The Weather Service Modernization Act of 1992, Public Law 102-567, Title VII, 106 Stat. 4303, was a bill put forward to the 102nd Congress in 1991-1992 to modernize the technology and operations of the National Weather Service (NWS). It was discussed in sessions of Congress for two years. On September 22, 1992, it was referred to the House Committee on Science, Space and Technology. The bill was proposed as a time when the U.S. Congress had considerable interest in the NWS Modernization Program which would impact upon local weather offices. The bill was finally enacted on October 29, 1992 and signed by President George H.W. Bush.

== Background and general effect ==
The Weather Service Modernization Act of 1992 came at a time when "a new framework was needed to implement research advances in in-situ technology, radar and satellite to real time, meso-scale observations of weather, water, and climate." The bill was proposed to ensure to that Congress made it compulsory of the Secretary of Commerce to "certify that the modernization process will not degrade local weather services." It effectively ensured that basic weathers services of surface, upper air and radar operations, public forecasts, statements and warnings, hydrologic, marine, fire, and weather forecasts and warnings, agricultural forecasts and advisories, climatological services, emergency management support and services wouldn't be affected by the plan of modernization at a local level. The Modernization Act effectively made it law that the network should provide complete coverage over the CONUS at a height of 3.05 km (10000 ft.) above ground level (AGL) without affecting the quality of service. The act required an increase in local staff and for many staff to relocate to areas where weather services were considered weak.

== Objectives ==
The Weather Service Modernization Act of 1992 was put forward as part of the Department of Commerce's annual budget with a 10–year National Implementation Plan under the National Aeronautics and Space Administration Authorization Act. The objectives of the proposal were as follows:

- 1. Contract with the National Research Council (NRC) for a review of the scientific and technical modernization criteria by which the Secretary proposes to certify action to close, consolidate, automate, or relocate NWS field offices.
- 2. Publish in the Federal Register final modernization criteria based on such NRC review. Changes requirements for certification that the closing, consolidation, automation, or relocation of any field office will not result in service degradation.

To prohibit the Secretary of Commerce from:

- 1. Changing operations at an NWS field office pursuant to implementation of the Strategic Plan unless the Secretary has provided appropriate notification.
- 2. Removing or permanently decommissioning any NWS radar until the Secretary has prepared radar commissioning and decommissioning reports documenting that such action would be consistent with the final modernization criteria established above.
- 3. Commissioning an automated surface observing system located at an airport unless the weather services provided after commissioning will continue to be in full compliance with applicable flight aviation rules.
- 4 Closing, before January 1, 1996, any NWS field office pursuant to implementation of the Strategic Plan.
- 5. Losing or relocating any NWS field office located at an airport unless the Secretary determines that such action will not result in degradation of service that affects aircraft safety.
- 6. Losing or relocating any NWS field office which is the only office in a State unless the Secretary determines that a comparable level of weather services provided to in-State users will remain.
- 7. Losing, consolidating, automating, or relocating a NWS field office until arrangements have been made to maintain at least one person in the service area to act as a liaison officer with area weather service users with respect to the provision of information regarding NWS modernization and restructuring activities and weather warnings and forecasts.
