= Abandoned Barge Act of 1992 =

United States federal law

- Long title: An Act to amend title 46, United States Code, to prohibit abandonment of barges, and for other purposes.
- Acronyms (colloquial): ABA
- Nicknames: Oceans Act of 1992
- Enacted by: the 102nd United States Congress
- Effective: November 4, 1992

Citations
- Public law: 102-587
- Statutes at Large: 106 Stat. 5039 aka 106 Stat. 5081

Codification
- Titles amended: 46 U.S.C.: Shipping
- U.S.C. sections created: 46 U.S.C. ch. 47 § 4701 et seq.

Legislative history
- Introduced in the House as H.R. 5397 by Billy Tauzin (D–LA) on June 15, 1992; Committee consideration by House Merchant Marine and Fisheries, Senate Commerce, Science, and Transportation; Passed the House on August 3, 1992 (Passed voice vote); Passed the Senate on October 7, 1992 (Passed voice vote, in lieu of H.R. 5617); Signed into law by President George H. W. Bush on November 4, 1992

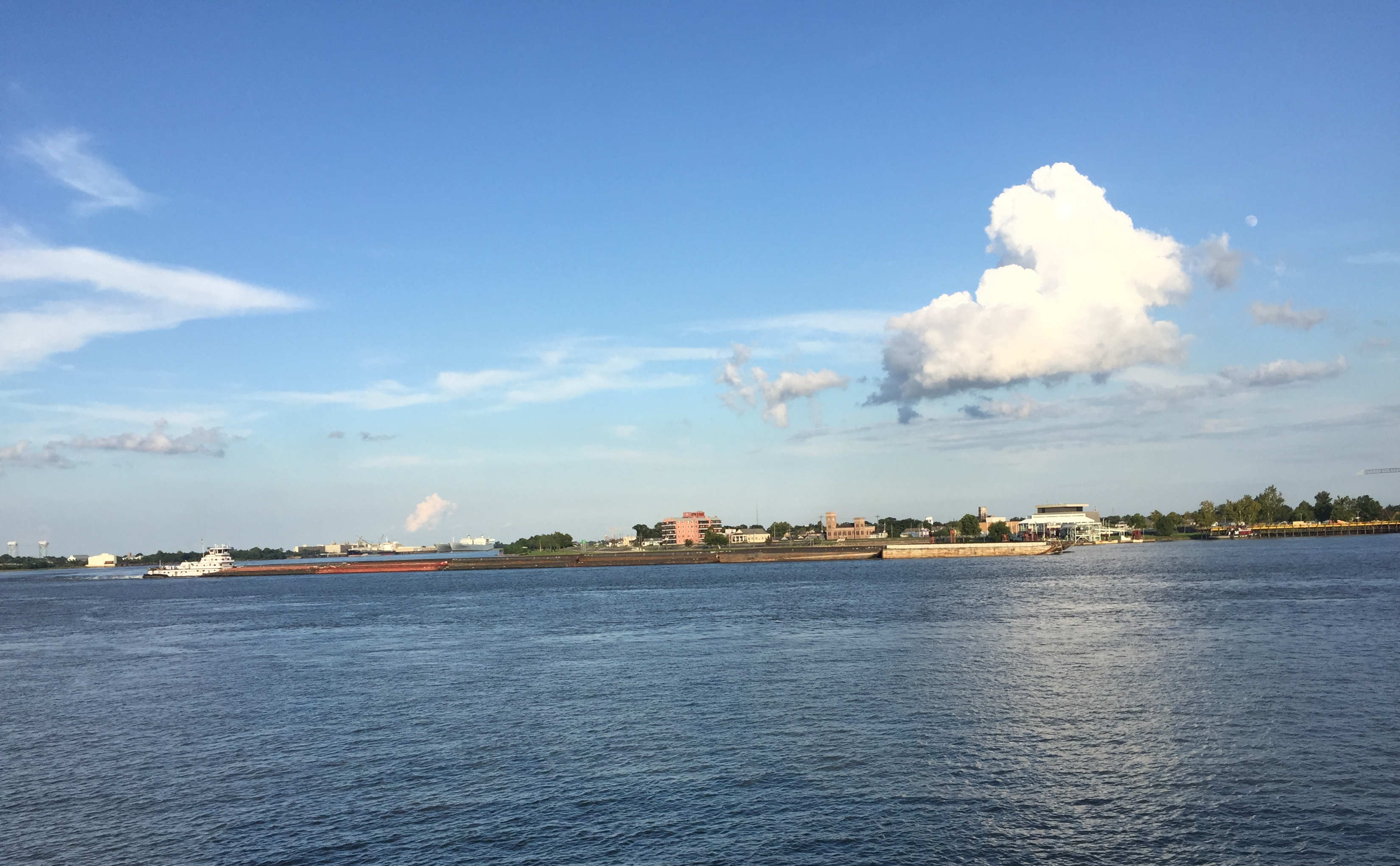
Tugboat navigating unused barges down the Mississippi River just north of the New Orleans Crescent City Connection.

Abandoned Barge Act of 1992, known as the Oceans Act of 1992, is United States federal law prohibiting the abandonment of barges in navigable and territorial waters. The Act of Congress establishes financial penalties and removal procedures for unattended barges exceeding forty-five days. The federal statute provides the U.S. Secretary of Transportation authority to contract with barge removal contractors for abandoned barges of more than one hundred gross tons.

The 1992 legislation was drafted as House Bill H.R. 5397 and Senate Bill S. 3262. The H.R. 5397 bill was superseded by House Bill H.R. 5617 finalizing the Oceans Act of 1992. The Act was passed by the 102nd United States Congressional session and enacted into law by the 41st President of the United States George H.W. Bush on November 4, 1992.

== Provisions of the Act ==
The Act amended Title 46 Shipping creating Chapter 47 Abandonment of Barges with five codified sections defining enforcement for abandoned flat-bottomed marine vessels navigating the America's Marine Highway.

46 U.S.C. § 4701 ~ Definitions
46 U.S.C. § 4702 ~ Abandonment of barge prohibited
46 U.S.C. § 4703 ~ Penalty for unlawful abandonment of barge
46 U.S.C. § 4704 ~ Removal of abandoned barges
46 U.S.C. § 4705 ~ Liability of barge removal contractors

== Legislative history ==
- On July 9, 1992, H.R. 5617 was introduced in the House and referred to the House Merchant Marine and Fisheries Committee. Rep. Gerry Studds (D-MA-10) sponsored the bill and Rep. Don Young (R-AK-At Large) was the co-sponsor.
- On July 15, 1992, the bill was referred to the House Merchant Marine and Fisheries Subcommittee on Fisheries and Wildlife Conservation and the Environment.
- On September 23, 1992, the bill was discharged from the Subcommittee and marked up by the committee.
- On September 29, 1992, the bill was reported by the Committee in H.R. Rep. No. 102-927. However, the Committee Report only discussed other aspects of the Oceans Act and did not discuss the Abandoned Barge Act contained in Title V, Subtitle C of the enacted legislation.
- On October 6, 1992, the bill passed the House by voice vote on motion to suspend the rules and pass the bill as amended.
- On October 7, 1992, the bill passed the Senate without amendment by voice vote.
- On October 26, 1992, the bill was presented to the President.
- On November 4, 1992, the bill was signed by the President and became Public Law No. 102-587.

== Amendments ==
The Abandoned Barge Act has been amended several times:

- The method of measuring tonnage under 46 U.S.C. § 4701 was amended in 1996.
- Stylistic changes were made to 46 U.S.C. §§ 4702 and 4705 in 2006.

== Rulemaking ==
In 1998, the Coast Guard issued a Notice of Proposed Rulemaking to "establish a statutorily required numbering system for undocumented barges more than 100 gross tons operating on the navigable waters of the United States" in order to " identify parties responsible for the illegal abandonment of barges and prevent future marine pollution from abandoned barges."

== See also ==
- Inland waterways of the United States
- Intracoastal Waterway
