= High Seas Driftnet Fisheries Enforcement Act of 1992 =

- Other short titles: Driftnet Moratorium Enforcement Act of 1991
- Long title: An Act to enhance the effectiveness of the United Nations international driftnet fishery conservation program.
- Acronyms (colloquial): HSDFEA
- Nicknames: Central Bering Sea Fisheries Enforcement Act of 1992
- Enacted by: the 102nd United States Congress
- Effective: November 2, 1992

Citations
- Public law: 102-582
- Statutes at Large: 106 Stat. 4900

Codification
- Titles amended: 16 U.S.C.: Conservation
- U.S.C. sections created: 16 U.S.C. ch. 38, subch. III §§ 1826a-1826c
- U.S.C. sections amended: 16 U.S.C. ch. 38, subch. I § 1801 et seq.

Legislative history
- Introduced in the House as H.R. 2152 by Gerry Studds (D–MA) on April 30, 1991; Committee consideration by House Merchant Marine and Fisheries, House Ways and Means; Passed the House on February 25, 1992 (412-0 Roll call vote 19, via Clerk.House.gov); Passed the Senate on July 31, 1992 (Passed voice vote) with amendment; House agreed to Senate amendment on August 10, 1992 (Agreed voice vote) with further amendment; Senate agreed to House amendment on August 12, 1992 (Agreed voice vote); Signed into law by President George H. W. Bush on November 2, 1992

High Seas Driftnet Fisheries Enforcement Act of 1992 is United States declaration citing an observance of the United Nations international driftnet fishery conservation program to restrict large scale driftnet fishing in high seas or international waters. The Act of Congress acknowledges the United Nations General Assembly Resolutions imposing a global moratorium on all high seas driftnet fishing by December 31, 1992. In accordance with Title 16 section 1857, the United States federal law 102-582 proclaims the Magnuson–Stevens Fishery Conservation and Management Act prohibits the application of large scale driftnet fishing within an exclusive economic zone of any sovereign state and the United States.

The 1992 legislation was drafted as House Bill H.R. 2152 and Senate Bill S. 884. The H.R. 2152 bill superseded the S. 884 bill which was passed by the 102nd United States Congressional session and enacted into law by the 41st President of the United States George H.W. Bush on November 2, 1992.

== Titles of the Act ==
The federal statute was drafted as five titles defining the United States bearing on judicial enforcement and marine conservation of large scale driftnet fishing in the Seven Seas.

=== Title I - High Seas Large-Scale Driftnet Fishing ===
Denial of port privileges and sanctions for high seas large-scale driftnet fishing
Duration of denial of port privileges and sanctions
Requirements under Marine Mammal Protection Act of 1972
Definitions

=== Title II - Fisheries Conservation Programs ===
Import restrictions under Fishermen's Protective Act of 1967
Enforcement
Trade negotiations and the environment

=== Title III - Fisheries Enforcement in Central Bering Sea ===
Prohibition applicable to United States vessels and nationals
Port privileges denial for fishing in Central Bering Sea
Duration of port privileges denial
Restriction of fishing in United States exclusive economic zone
Definitions
Termination

=== Title IV - Miscellaneous Provisions ===
Intermediary nations involved in export of certain tuna products
Authority to extend reemployment rights
Limitation on terms of voting members of regional fishery management councils
Observer fee for North Pacific fisheries research plan

=== Title V - Fees ===
Recreational boat tax repeal
Automated tariff filing and information system

== See also ==
- Drift netting
- Federal Maritime Commission
- Gillnetting
- National Marine Fisheries Service
- North Pacific Fishery Management Council
- United Nations Convention on the Law of the Sea
