= Edward Rowan Finnegan =

American politician

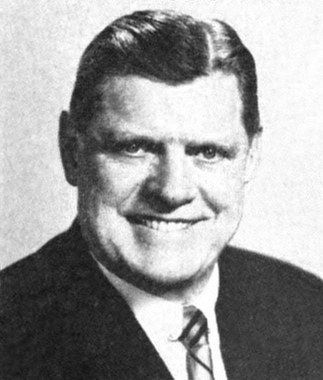

Judge of the Circuit Court of Cook County
- In office 1964 – February 2, 1971

Member of the U.S. House of Representatives from Illinois
- In office January 3, 1961 – December 6, 1964
- Preceded by: Charles A. Boyle
- Succeeded by: Sidney R. Yates
- Constituency: 12th district (1961–1963); 9th district (1963–1964)

Personal details
- Born: June 5, 1905 Chicago, Illinois, US
- Died: February 2, 1971 (aged 65) Chicago, Illinois, US
- Resting place: All Saints Catholic Cemetery and Mausoleum, Des Plaines, Illinois
- Party: Democratic
- Spouse(s): Katherine (d. 1961) Iris McCreevey (m. 1964)
- Children: 3
- Education: DePaul University (LL.B.)
- Profession: Attorney

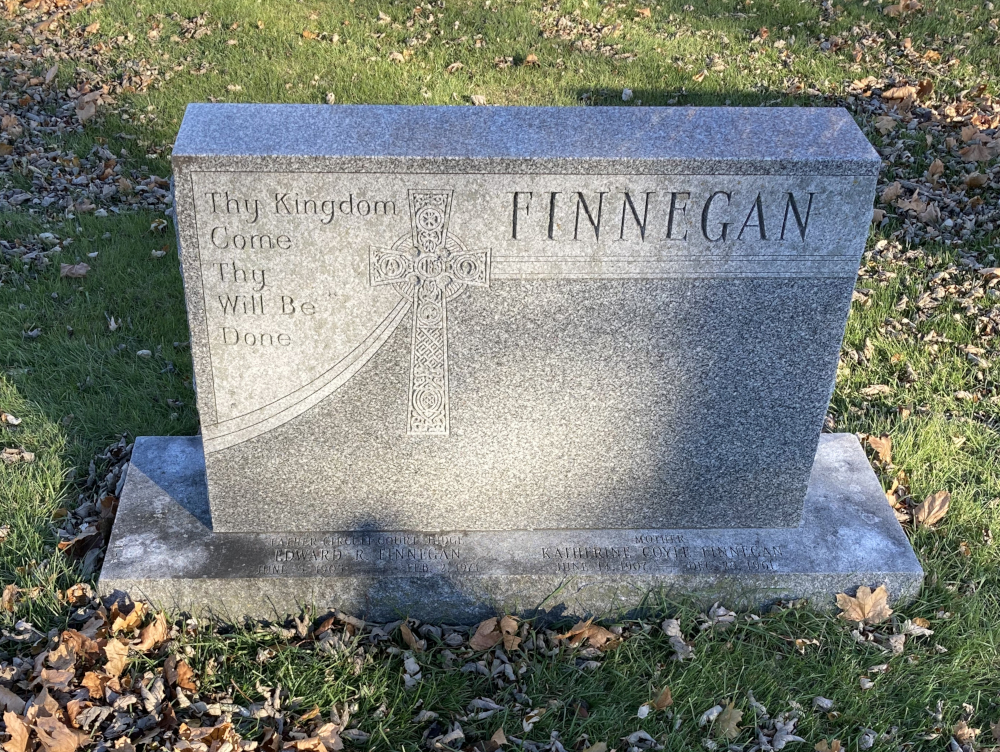
Grave of Edward Rowan Finnegan

Edward Rowan Finnegan (June 5, 1905 – February 2, 1971) was an attorney and politician from Illinois. He served as a member of the U.S. representative from Illinois from 1961 to 1964 and a judge of the Circuit Court of Cook County from 1964 until his death.

== Biography ==
Finnegan was born in Chicago and attended the parochial schools. He graduated from St. Rita High School, and attended Loyola University Chicago and Northwestern University Law School. Finnegan graduated from DePaul University with a LL.B. degree in 1930. He was admitted to the bar in 1931 and practiced in Chicago.

In 1939, Finnegan unsuccessfully sought the Democratic nomination for municipal court judge. In 1945, he was appointed an assistant state's attorney for Cook County, and served until 1956. He served as an assistant city corporation counsel from 1956 to 1957.

In 1960, Finnegan was elected to the United States House of Representatives from Illinois' 12th district. After redistricting, he was reelected from the 9th district in 1962. He served from January 1961 until resigning in December 1964. Finnegan ran in the newly configured 9th district in 1962 because incumbent Sidney R. Yates won the Democratic nomination for U.S. Senator. In the general election, Yates was unsuccessful in his campaign against Republican incumbent Everett Dirksen.

Finnegan was renominated for the US House in April 1964. Later that month, he nearly drowned while swimming at the Lake Shore Club. A lifeguard administered cardiopulmonary resuscitation for several minutes before he regained consciousness, and he was hospitalized for several days.

Finnegan decided later in 1964 that he preferred to serve as a judge, while Yates desired to return to the U.S. House. In October 1964, Finnegan resigned the U.S. House nomination. Yates was chosen as his replacement and easily won the November election.

Finnegan was nominated for judge of the Circuit Court of Cook County. He won his November 1964 election, then resigned from Congress shortly before the expiration of his term. Finnegan served on the bench from December 1964 until his death.

Finnegan died at a Chicago hospital on February 2, 1971. He was buried at All Saints Catholic Cemetery and Mausoleum in Des Plaines, Illinois.

== Family ==
Finnegan's first wife, Katherine, died in 1961. They were the parents of three daughters—Sara, Moira, and Kathleen. In 1964, Finnegan married Iris McCreevey, who survived him.

U.S. House of Representatives
Preceded by Charles A. Boyle	Member of the U.S. House of Representatives from Illinois's 12th congressional district January 3, 1961 – January 3, 1963	Succeeded by Robert McClory
Preceded by Sidney R. Yates	Member of the U.S. House of Representatives from Illinois's 9th congressional district January 3, 1963 – December 6, 1964	Succeeded by Sidney R. Yates
