= Charles A. Boyle =

American politician (1907–1959)

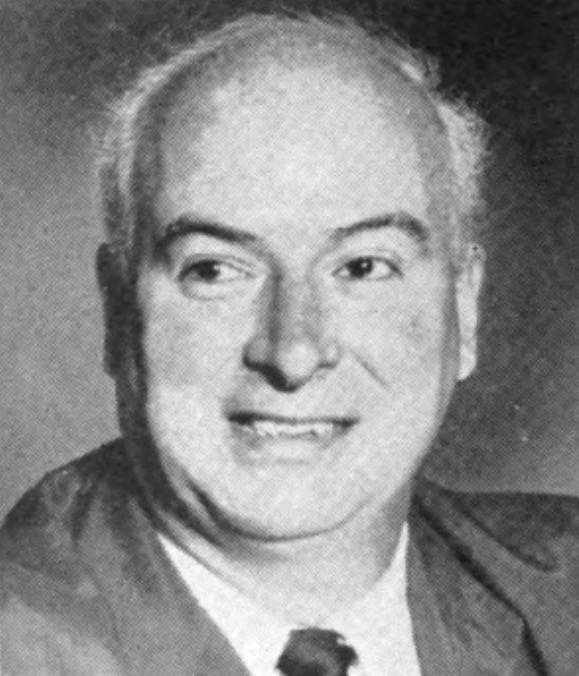

Member of the U.S. House of Representatives from Illinois's 12th district
- In office January 3, 1955 – November 4, 1959
- Preceded by: Edgar A. Jonas
- Succeeded by: Edward Rowan Finnegan

Personal details
- Born: Charles Augustus Boyle; August 13, 1907 Spring Lake, Michigan, U.S.
- Died: November 4, 1959 (aged 52) Chicago, Illinois, U.S.
- Party: Democratic
- Spouse: Helen L. Shaughnessy (m. 1940)
- Children: 8
- Relatives: Lara Flynn Boyle (granddaughter)
- Education: Loyola University Chicago; Loyola University Chicago School of Law
- Profession: Lawyer

Charles Augustus Boyle (August 13, 1907 – November 4, 1959) was an American politician who was a U.S. representative from Chicago's north side representing Illinois's 12th congressional district from 1955 to his death in a car accident.

== Early life, education, and career ==
Boyle was born in Spring Lake, Michigan on August 13, 1907, the son of Rose (née Marsh) and Michael Melvin Boyle. His paternal grandparents were Irish.

Boyle grew up on his parents' farm for much of his youth. He also spent another portion of his youth in Hammond, Indiana. After leaving his parents' farm for Illinois, he attended Mount Carmel High School in Chicago, and graduated from the high school in 1925.

In 1930, Boyle graduated from Loyola University Chicago with an undergraduate degree, and in 1933 he graduated from the Loyola University Chicago School of Law with a law degree. He worked Chicago Motor Coach Company as a student, being employed as bus driver for seven years, including the years he received his degrees. He was admitted to the Illinois state bar association in 1934, and began working as a lawyer in Chicago. In 1937 and 1938, he worked for a period as a zone attorney for the Federal Housing Administration. At the time of his death, he was a member of the law firm Boyle, Murphy, and Walsh.

== Congressional tenure ==
A member of the Democratic Party, Boyle was elected to the United States House of Representatives in 1954, representing the Illinois's 12th congressional district. He was the first Democrat to represent the district, and won election in an upset over the incumbent, Edgar A. Jonas (a Republican). The district covered portions of the North Side of Chicago, including the campus of his alma mater Loyola University. Boyle was re-elected to congress in 1956 and 1958, and served on the House Committee on the Judiciary and House Appropriations Committee, and later as a member of the House Appropriations Subcommittee on Defense.

Boyle had a reputation as a strong supporter of Israel. After Farid Zeineddine, the ambassador of Syria to the United States, made remarks considered derogatory towards Jewish Americans, Boyle called for the expulsion of Zeineddine from the United States. In 1957, the government of Israel honored Boyle on his fiftieth birthday by naming a 1,000-tree eucalyptus grove in the Judaean Hills for him.

=== Death ===
Congressman Boyle died in a car crash on November 4, 1959, traveling home from campaigning for fellow Democrats in elections the day before. He died after his car had crashed into an elevated train pillar on North Western Avenue. Police speculated that Boyle had either fallen asleep or been cut off by another car. He was the only occupant of his vehicle at the time of the crash. The 12th district went unrepresented for more than a year until after the 1960 general election, when Democrat Edward Rowan Finnegan defeated Republican Theodore P. Fields.

== Family and personal life ==
Boyle was Roman Catholic. He was a member of the Illinois Bar Association, the American Bar Association, the Benevolent and Protective Order of Elks, the Knights of Columbus, the University Council of the Irish Fellowship, and the Edgewater Golf Club.

Boyle married his wife, Helen L. (née Shaughnessy), in 1940. They had eight children together: Charles A. Boyle Jr. (also known as "Patrick" or "Pat"), Marty, Thomas, Rose, Loran, Irene, Michael, Larry, and Catherine. The Boyles' eldest child, son Charles "Pat" Boyle, became a lawyer, and briefly ran as a candidate in the Democratic primary of the 1998 open-seat race in Illinois's 9th congressional district. However, his candidacy was largely overlooked, and he withdrew. Additionally, through their son Michael, the Boyles are the paternal grandparents of actress Lara Flynn Boyle.

Boyle was the 1952 recipient of the "Chicago Father of the Year" and "Mr. Illinois" honors.

== See also ==
- List of members of the United States Congress who died in office (1950–1999)

U.S. House of Representatives
Preceded by Edgar A. Jonas	Member of the U.S. House of Representatives from Illinois's 12th congressional district January 3, 1955 - November 4, 1959	Succeeded by Edward Rowan Finnegan
