= Edgar A. Jonas =

American politician (1885-1965)

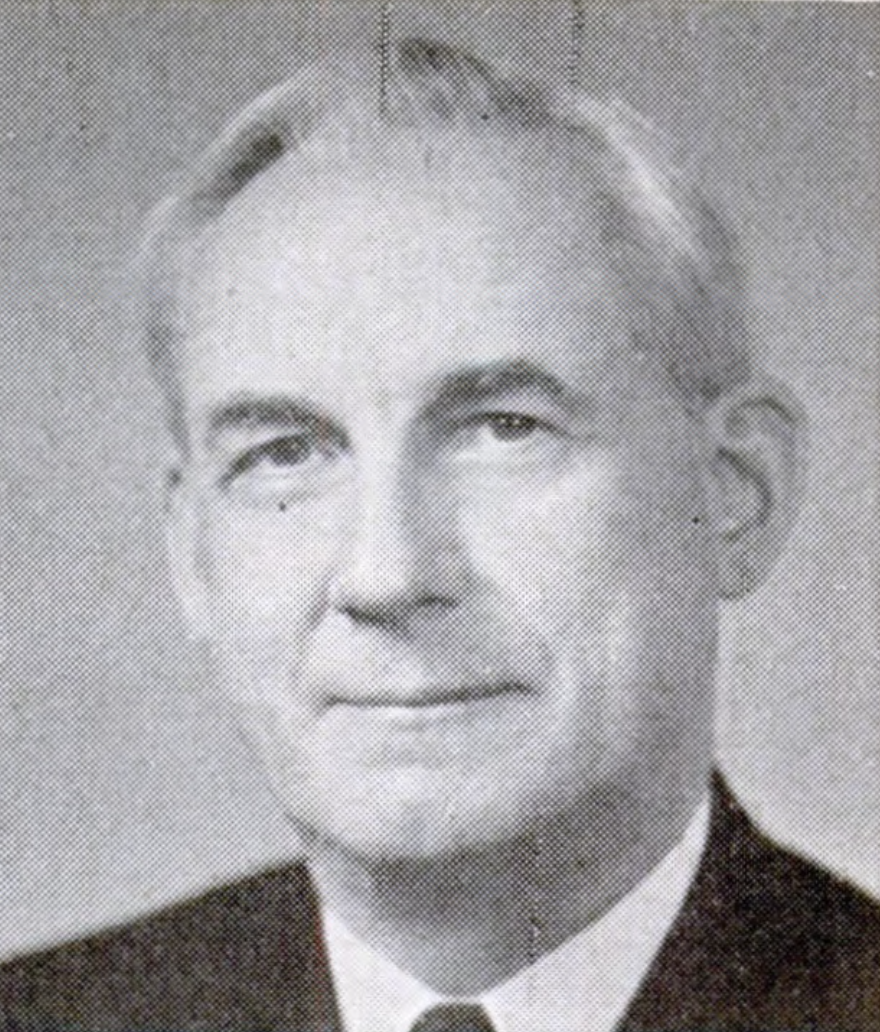

Member of the U.S. House of Representatives from Illinois's 12th district
- In office January 3, 1949 – January 3, 1955
- Preceded by: Noah M. Mason
- Succeeded by: Charles A. Boyle

Judge of the Superior Court of Cook County
- In office 1941–1942

Judge of the Municipal Court of Chicago
- In office 1923–1937

Personal details
- Born: October 14, 1885 Mishicot, Wisconsin
- Died: November 14, 1965 (aged 80) Evanston, Illinois
- Party: Republican

Edgar Allan Jonas (October 14, 1885 – November 14, 1965) was an American politician who was a U.S. Representative from Illinois.

== Biography ==
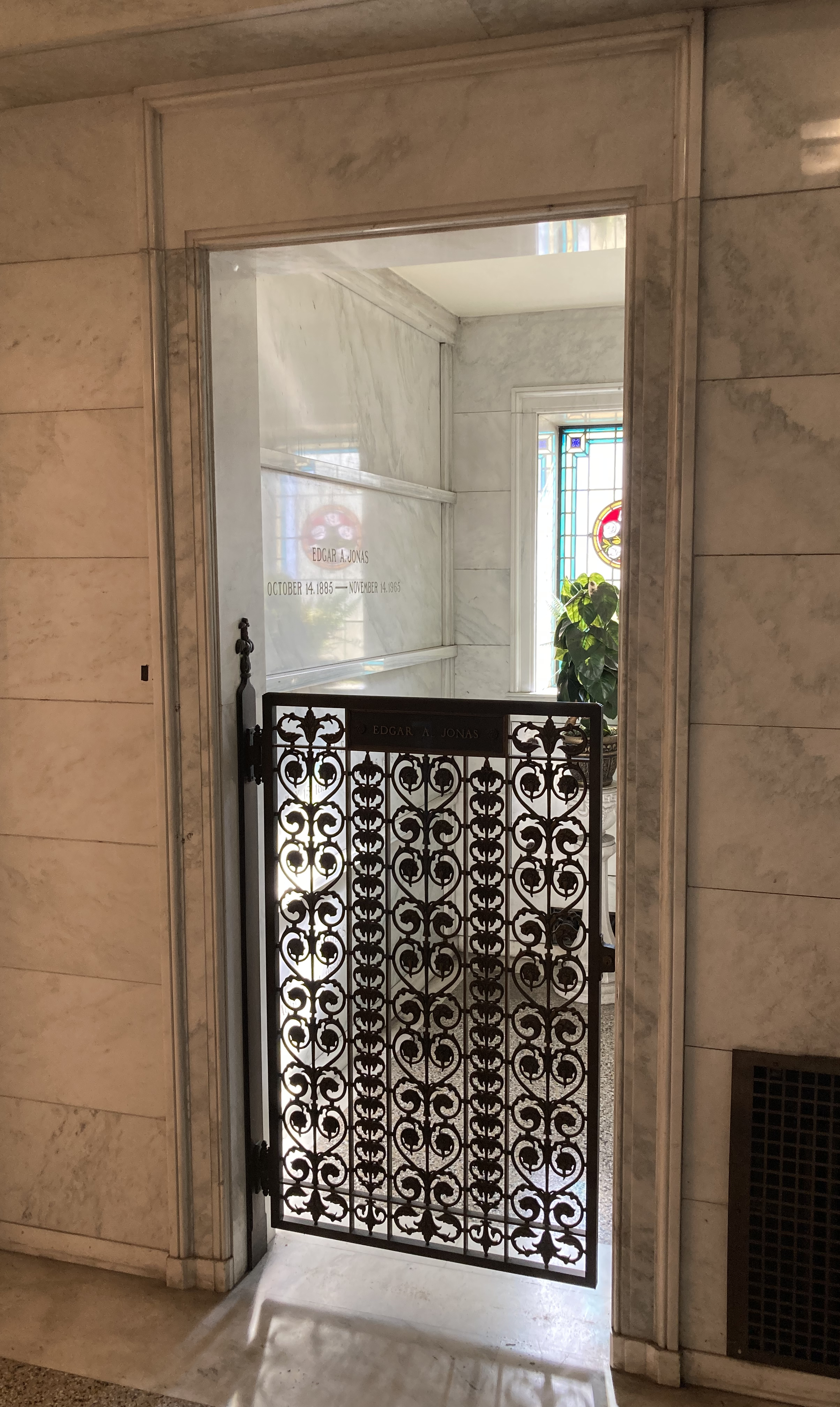
Jonas's grave at Rosehill Mausoleum

Born in Mishicot, Wisconsin, Jonas attended the public schools and graduated from the Manitowoc County Normal School. He taught in the rural schools of Manitowoc County 1903–1907. He was graduated from the University of Chicago Law School in June 1910. He was admitted to the bar in 1909 and commenced the practice of law in Chicago, Illinois. He served as assistant corporation counsel of Chicago, Illinois, in 1919 and 1920. First assistant State's attorney of Cook County, Illinois from 1921 to 1923. He served as a judge of the Municipal Court of Chicago 1923–1937. He served as a judge of the Superior Court of Cook County in 1941 and 1942. He served as an associate member of Board of Pardons and Paroles of Illinois 1945–1947. He served as a delegate to the Republican National Convention in 1948.

In 1921, Jonas had run successfully as a Republican nominee for the Circuit Court of Cook County.

Jonas was elected as a Republican to the Eighty-first, Eighty-second, and Eighty-third Congresses (January 3, 1949 – January 3, 1955).

Hunter initially sought the Republican nomination in the 1951 Chicago mayoral election, but withdrew by surprise in early January.

He was an unsuccessful candidate for reelection in 1954 to the Eighty-fourth Congress and for election in 1956 to the Eighty-fifth Congress. He resumed the practice of law and was a resident of Chicago, Illinois. He died in Evanston, Illinois, November 14, 1965. He was interred in Rosehill Cemetery in Chicago.

U.S. House of Representatives
Preceded by Noah M. Mason	Member of the U.S. House of Representatives from Illinois's 12th congressional district January 3, 1949 - January 3, 1955	Succeeded by Charles A. Boyle
