= Sidney Yates =

American politician (1909–2000)

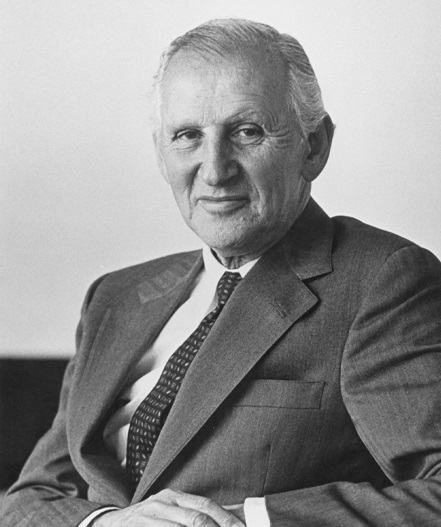
- Yates in 1997

Member of the U.S. House of Representatives from Illinois's 9th district
- In office January 3, 1965 – January 3, 1999
- Preceded by: Edward R. Finnegan
- Succeeded by: Jan Schakowsky
- In office January 3, 1949 – January 3, 1963
- Preceded by: Robert Twyman
- Succeeded by: Edward R. Finnegan

Personal details
- Born: Sidney Richard Yates; August 27, 1909 Chicago, Illinois, U.S.
- Died: October 5, 2000 (aged 91) Washington, D.C., U.S.
- Resting place: Memorial Park Cemetery, Skokie, Illinois
- Party: Democratic
- Spouse: Adeline Holleb (1914–2002)
- Children: Stephen R. Yates (1940–2000)
- Education: University of Chicago (B Ph, JD)
- Profession: Attorney

Military service
- Allegiance: United States
- Branch/service: United States Navy
- Years of service: 1944–1946
- Rank: Lieutenant
- Unit: Judge Advocate General's Corps
- Battles/wars: World War II
- Sidney R. Yates's voice Yates on his support for substitute legislation concerning gas extraction royalties Recorded November 3, 1987

Sidney Richard Yates (August 27, 1909 – October 5, 2000) was an American attorney and Democratic Party politician who represented the state of Illinois in the United States House of Representatives for twenty-four terms from 1949 to 1963 and 1965 to 1999, one of the longest tenures in the history of the House. He was an advocate for liberal causes and a long-time member of the House Appropriations Committee, where he became known for staunch U.S. support of Israel, and federal funding for parks, historical conservation, and the arts.

A native of Chicago, he graduated from Lake View High School in 1928. He received bachelor's (1931) and J.D. (1933) degrees from the University of Chicago, was admitted to the bar, and practiced law in Chicago. In addition to working as an attorney, Yates also played semiprofessional basketball in the 1930s. He gained his initial experience in government as an attorney for the state bank receiver (1935–1937), and an assistant state attorney general specializing in traction railroads for the Illinois Commerce Commission (1937–1940). During World War II, Yates served in the United States Navy for two years (1944–1946) as an attorney based in Washington, D.C.

In 1948, Yates was elected to Congress, and he served from 1949 to 1963. After an unsuccessful run against Everett Dirksen for the United States Senate in 1962, in 1964 Yates was again elected to the House. He served from 1965 to 1999, and did not run for reelection in 1998. He was a longtime member of the House Appropriations Committee, where he became known for staunch U.S. support of Israel, and federal funding for parks, historical conservation, and the arts. Yates was also an advocate for several liberal causes, including opposition to discrimination based on age. At the time he concluded his service, he was the third oldest person to ever serve in the House (age 89) behind Charles Manly Stedman and Isaac R. Sherwood, and one of the longest-tenured members in the history of Congress (total House service of 48 years).

Yates died in Washington in 2000. He was buried at Memorial Park Cemetery in Skokie, Illinois.

== Early life ==
Yates was born in Chicago, Illinois, the youngest of six children of Lithuanian Jewish immigrants Louis and Ida Yates. He grew up in Chicago and was an office boy at Variety's Chicago office during the 1920s. He graduated from the University of Chicago in 1931 with a Bachelor of Philosophy degree and received a J.D. degree from the University of Chicago Law School in 1933. While in college, Yates joined the Pi Lambda Phi fraternity. He also played basketball, and was selected for All Big Ten honors. In the mid-1930s, he played semiprofessional basketball and practiced law. Yates was an attorney for the Illinois state bank receiver from 1935 to 1937. From 1937 to 1940 he was an assistant state attorney general attached to the Illinois Commerce Commission as a traction attorney. (Note: "Traction" refers the Chicago public transit system, which included trains and trolleys powered by electric traction motors.) He served in the United States Navy during World War II, assigned as an attorney for the Bureau of Ships in Washington, DC.

== Career in Congress ==
From 1949 to 1963 and 1965 to 1999, Yates served in the House of Representatives as a Democrat. Although the boundaries of his district changed over the years, it was always anchored in the Chicago lakefront. From the 1970s onward, Chicago's declining population resulted in the district spilling into the northern suburbs. By the time Yates retired, his district also included Evanston, Des Plaines, Glenview, Rosemont and Skokie.

Yates was one of the first congressmen to speak out against age discrimination, arguing in 1951 that mandatory retirement of workers was wrong and deprived older people of their right to lead a proud, productive and independent life.

During the late 1950s, after a series of lurid magazine articles and Hollywood films helped to sensationalize youth gangs and violence, Yates called for legislation to ban automatic-opening or switchblade knives, melodramatically proclaiming that "Vicious fantasies of omnipotence, idolatry...barbaric and sadistic atrocities, and monstrous violations of accepted values spring from the cult of the weapon, and the switchblade knife is included in this. Minus switchblade knives and the distorted feeling of power they beget—power that is swaggering, reckless, and itching to express itself in violence—our delinquent adolescents would be shorn of one of their most potent means of incitement to crime." The ban on switchblade knives was eventually enacted into law as the Switchblade Knife Act of 1958. Rep. Yates and other congressmen supporting the Switchblade Knife Act believed that by stopping the importation and interstate sales of automatic knives (effectively halting sales of new switchblades), the law would reduce youth gang violence by blocking access to what had become a symbolic weapon. However, while switchblade imports, domestic production, and sales to lawful owners soon ended, later legislative research demonstrated that youth gang violence rates had in fact rapidly increased, as gang members began using firearms instead of knives.

Yates was an unsuccessful candidate for the United States Senate in 1962 against Republican incumbent and Senate Minority Leader Everett Dirksen. He briefly served at the United Nations before returning to the House after the 1964 election. Fellow Democrat Edward Finnegan won Yates' old seat after his former district was merged with the 9th, but Chicago machine bosses persuaded him to accept a circuit judgeship in return for letting Yates take his old seat back. Yates served on the Appropriations Committee throughout his career and chaired the Interior Subcommittee from 1975 to 1995. On this committee he supported environmental programs and the National Endowment for the Arts.

Yates remained on good terms with both liberal reformers and machine politicians in Chicago throughout his career. He also served on the Foreign Operations subcommittee and was a strong advocate of American support for Israel. He worked hand-in-hand with his chief of staff, Mary Bain, to preserve federal funding for the arts and for Natural Heritage Preservation programs, and to establish the U.S. Holocaust Memorial Museum.

In 1993, he was presented with the Presidential Citizens Medal by President Clinton and in 1997 he received the Four Freedoms Award for Freedom of Speech In 1999, the Auditors Building in Washington, DC, was renamed the Sidney Yates Building in his honor.

He is the longest-serving member ever of the United States House of Representatives from the state of Illinois. As of 2026, his 48 years in the US House makes him the 14th longest-serving member in the history of the US Congress, and he has the longest tenure of members whose time included a break in service.

== Death and burial ==
Yates died in Washington, D.C., on October 5, 2000. He was buried at Memorial Park Cemetery in Skokie, Illinois.

== Family ==
Yates was married to Adeline Holleb (1914–2002) for 65 years. They were the parents of Stephen R. Yates (1940–2000), who served as an Illinois circuit court judge.

His brother Charles was a talent agent whose clients included Bob Hope, Bing Crosby and Martha Raye.

== See also ==
- List of Jewish members of the United States Congress

== Notes ==
Party political offices
Preceded by W. Richard Stengel	Democratic nominee for U.S. Senator from Illinois (Class 3); 1962	Succeeded by William G. Clark
U.S. House of Representatives
Preceded by Robert J. Twyman	Member of the U.S. House of Representatives from Illinois's 9th congressional district January 3, 1949 – January 3, 1963	Succeeded by Edward R. Finnegan
Preceded by Edward R. Finnegan	Member of the U.S. House of Representatives from Illinois's 9th congressional district January 3, 1965 – January 3, 1999	Succeeded by Jan Schakowsky
Honorary titles
Preceded by Augustus Hawkins	Oldest member of the U.S. House of Representatives; 1991–1999	Succeeded by Benjamin Gilman
