= Mary Anderson Bain =

American politician (1911–2006)

Mary Anderson Bain (September 19, 1911 – August 7, 2006) was a New Deal politician best known for her 33 years of service as Chief of Staff for Representative Sidney R. Yates, of Illinois.

Bain was born in DeKalb, where she was involved in Democratic politics. In 1935 she became the director of the National Youth Administration, one of Franklin D. Roosevelt's New Deal agencies, for the Northern Illinois District. By 1939 she was director of NYA for all of Illinois. Later she was deputy director of the Illinois War Manpower Commission, roving Midwest executive for the Office of Price Administration, and Illinois Director for the U.S. Employment Service.

In 1937 she married a reporter named Herbert Bain, who was an editor of the old Chicago Herald-American before becoming a public relations executive in Chicago and Washington. The couple were very close through to his death on June 11, 2006; they were both 94 at the time of their deaths. They are survived by a daughter, Mary Ellen Bain, and two grandsons.

Bain's career on Capitol Hill began in 1965, when she became Chief of Staff to Representative Sidney R. Yates (D-Ill.). Yates became chairman of the House Appropriations Committee’s Subcommittee on Interior and Related Agencies in 1975. Together Yates and Bain worked to promote the preservation of the nation's cultural heritage and history through the founding of the U.S. Holocaust Memorial Museum, the Brittle Books and National Heritage Preservation programs at the National Endowment for the Humanities, establishment of the Conservation Program at the Institute for Museum and Library Services, and establishment of a cultural heritage grants program at the National Park Service. Mary also aided the development of the National Endowment for the Arts, the Smithsonian Institution, the National Gallery of Art, and the Kennedy Center; in recognition of her leadership in this area, Bain was awarded the Heritage Defender award. She retired in 1999.
