= 1992 United States Senate special election in North Dakota =

- December 4, 1992
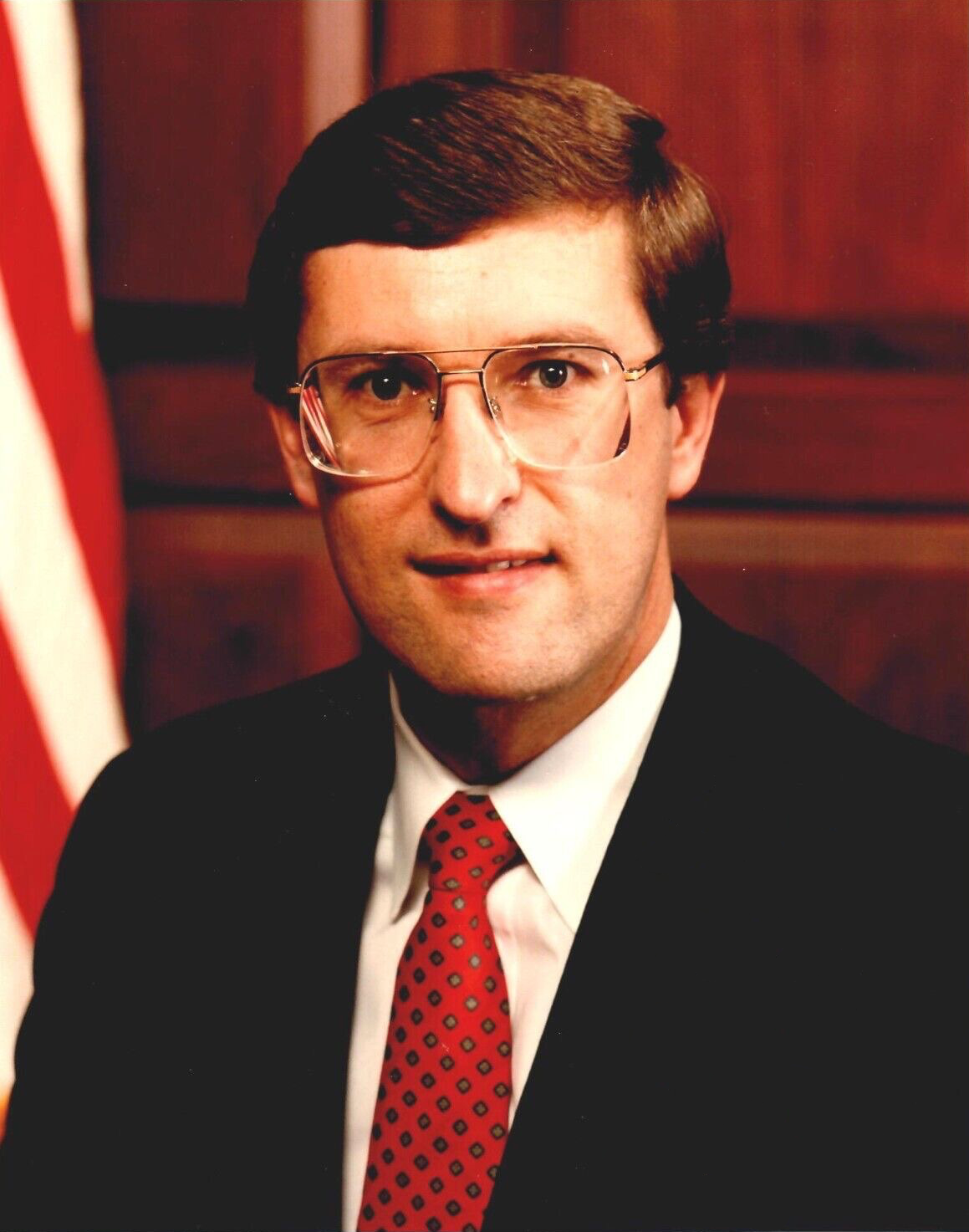

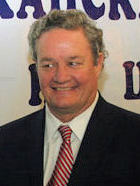
| Nominee | Kent Conrad | Jack Dalrymple |
| Party | Democratic–NPL | Republican |
| Popular vote | 103,246 | 55,194 |
| Percentage | 63.22% | 33.80% |
- County results Conrad: 50–60% 60–70% 70–80% Dalrymple: 40–50% 50–60%
U.S. senator before election
Jocelyn Burdick
Democratic–NPL
Elected U.S. Senator
Kent Conrad
Democratic–NPL

The 1992 United States Senate special election in North Dakota was held on December 4, 1992, to fill the United States Senate seat vacated by the late Quentin Burdick. Burdick's widow, Jocelyn Burdick, was appointed as a temporary replacement until the election was held.

Democratic-NPL nominee Kent Conrad, who held North Dakota's other senate seat since 1986, had not run for re-election to his own seat, holding himself to a campaign promise pledging to reduce the federal deficit. However, as the seat was not technically Conrad's, he opted to run for the now open seat for a second term. Conrad won the election against state representative and future Governor of North Dakota Jack Dalrymple.

== Major candidates ==
=== Democratic-NPL ===
- Kent Conrad, U.S. Senator

=== Republican ===
- Jack Dalrymple, State Representative

=== Independent ===
Darold Larson, reverend

== Campaign ==
On April 2, 1992, in a surprise announcement, Kent Conrad announced he would not seek re-election to his seat, keeping a 1986 campaign promise to not run if the federal deficit had not been reduced. However, on September 8, the state's other Senator, Quentin Burdick, died of heart failure at the age of 84. Burdick's death provided an opportunity for Conrad to remain in the Senate on the grounds that it was technically not his seat. Gov. George Sinner endorsed Conrad immediately, promising to lead a draft movement for Conrad. On September 21, Conrad announced his intent to seek the now open seat. On October 4, he officially became the Democratic nominee.

On the Republican side, there had initially been an attempt to draft former senator Mark Andrews for the race. Andrews would ultimately decline on September 26, opting to spend time with his family. The Republican nominee would be Jack Dalrymple, a state representative who ran concurrently in this race with his own re-election campaign. He defeated financial planner David Vanderscoff with 426 votes to 126. Dalrymple saw Conrad's run as a breach of his promise in spirit if not letter. He contended that Conrad had intended to run for Burdick's seat the whole time, and Conrad was a liar. Among other issues, Dalrymple argued in favor of a plan that would guarantee farmers $5 for a bushel of wheat, a plan which Conrad criticized as unrealistic. Dalrymple also tried to attack Conrad for indicating a willingness to cut Medicare in a debate, though Conrad contended he only intended to reduce costs via reform.

A third candidate was Darold Larson, a reverend who ran an anti-abortion campaign, including airing a graphic ad showing aborted fetuses. Ultimately Conrad's high name recognition approval ratings as Senator carried through and he was seen as the clear favorite to secure victory against Dalrymple. As a result, the biggest concern for both campaigns was getting their supporters to vote due to apathy. Conrad won decisively, albeit with lower turnout statewide, in part due to election fatigue and cold weather.

=== Debate ===
Complete video of debate, November 27, 1992

== Results ==
General election results
| Party | Candidate | Votes | % | ±% |
|---|---|---|---|---|
| Democratic–NPL | Kent Conrad | 103,246 | 63.22 | +3.77 |
| Republican | Jack Dalrymple | 55,194 | 33.80 | −5.26 |
| Independent | Darold Larson | 4,871 | 2.98 | N/A |
| Majority | | 48,052 | | |
| Turnout | | 163,311 | | |
| Democratic–NPL hold | | Swing | | |

== See also ==
- 1992 United States Senate elections
