= Jack Dalrymple =

32nd Governor of North Dakota

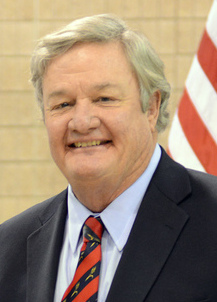
- Dalrymple in 2013

32nd Governor of North Dakota
- In office December 7, 2010 – December 15, 2016
- Lieutenant: Drew Wrigley
- Preceded by: John Hoeven
- Succeeded by: Doug Burgum

36th Lieutenant Governor of North Dakota
- In office December 15, 2000 – December 7, 2010
- Governor: John Hoeven
- Preceded by: Rosemarie Myrdal
- Succeeded by: Drew Wrigley

48th Chair of the National Lieutenant Governors Association
- In office 2007–2008
- Preceded by: John D. Cherry
- Succeeded by: Barbara Lawton

Member of the North Dakota House of Representatives from the 22nd district
- In office 1985–2000
- Succeeded by: Vonnie Pietsch

Personal details
- Born: John Stewart Dalrymple III; October 16, 1948 (age 78) Minneapolis, Minnesota, U.S.
- Party: Republican
- Spouse: Betsy Wood
- Children: 4 daughters
- Education: Yale University (BA)

John Stewart Dalrymple III (born October 16, 1948) is an American politician and businessman who served as the 32nd governor of North Dakota from 2010 to 2016. A member of the Republican Party, he previously served as the 36th lieutenant governor of North Dakota from 2000 to 2010 under Governor John Hoeven.

Dalrymple assumed the governorship following Hoeven's election to the United States Senate. Prior to his inauguration as North Dakota Lieutenant Governor, Dalrymple served in the North Dakota House of Representatives for the 22nd district for eight consecutive terms, from 1985 through 2000. He was a candidate for the U.S. Senate twice, in 1988 and 1992.

== Early life ==
Dalrymple was born on October 16, 1948, in Minneapolis, Minnesota, the son of Mary Josephine (Knoblauch) and John Stewart Dalrymple Jr. He spent many of his formative years in Casselton, North Dakota, on his family's wheat farm, which was established in 1875 by his great-grandfather, Oliver Dalrymple.

At age 7, when Dalrymple was in elementary school in 1955, his grandfather, John Stewart Dalrymple, Oliver's son, "still owned about 25,000 acres of farmland". In 1966, he graduated from The Blake School, a private co-educational day school, where he took the preparatory course to earn his high school diploma.

Heading to Connecticut for college as a legacy student, Dalrymple graduated with honors from Yale College with the Class of 1970, with an A.B. in American Studies.

== Agricultural career ==
After graduation Dalrymple returned to North Dakota, going to work managing the family's Dalrymple Farm in the Red River Valley, a durum wheat producer in the Casselton area.

In 1983 Dalrymple was named the Outstanding Young Farmer of the United States of America by Outstanding Farmers of America (OFA).

In 1992 he was the founding board chairman of Dakota Growers Pasta Company, formed as an agricultural cooperative of more than 1,100 primarily North Dakota wheat growers. The cooperative grew to become North America's third-largest manufacturer and marketer of dry pasta products. Dakota Growers Pasta provides an array of products for retail brands, retail private label and food service. Dalrymple led the transition of the structure of the organization, from a cooperative to a C corporation, in order to both raise capital and to perform acquisitions. Dakota Growers Pasta was sold in May 2010 for about $240 million to a Canadian firm, Viterra Inc. Opposition to the Viterra sale was largely due to the fact that "the cooperative was created with the help of the state-owned Bank of North Dakota, other rural cooperatives and the city of Carrington, where the cooperative was based." Some government leaders felt strongly that these entities should also benefit from the sale.

Ernst and Young (now EY) selected Dalrymple as the 2007 Master Winner Award Winner Upper Midwest Region, for his work in helping to found and guide Dakota Growers Pasta Company.

== Volunteer service ==
In Fargo in 1975, Dalrymple helped to found ShareHouse Inc., a residential treatment program for those recovering from alcohol or drug dependencies.

During the 1980s, Dalrymple served on the Casselton (ND) Jobs Development Commission.

In the 1990s, Dalrymple was chairman of the Board for Prairie Public Television (now Prairie Public), the PBS affiliate which also provides radio and public media services serving North Dakota and the surrounding region.

== Career in the state legislature ==
In 1984, he won a seat in the North Dakota House of Representatives. He won re-election in 1986, 1988, 1990, 1992, 1994, 1996, and 1998. He represented rural Casselton, Cass County.

He served as chairman of the House Appropriations Committee for four years. In the 1999-2000 interim, he also chaired the Budget Section, the legislative panel charged with reviewing spending issues between sessions.

== U.S. Senate elections ==
=== 1988 ===
In December 1987, Dalrymple announced he would run for the U.S. Senate. He lost the Republican nomination to state House majority leader Earl Strinden. Strinden lost the general election to incumbent Democratic U.S. senator Quentin Burdick.

=== 1992 ===
On September 8, 1992, Burdick died. Governor George Sinner appointed Burdick's widow Jocelyn Burdick to fill the vacancy until a special election was held. She was not a candidate for election to the rest of the term. On September 17, 1992, Dalrymple announced he would run in the special election. In October 1992, he won the Republican nomination. Kent Conrad, who held North Dakota's other Senate seat at the time but had planned to retire from it (he decided to run to fill the Burdick vacancy), defeated Dalrymple 63–34%. Dalrymple only won three counties in the state: Billings, McIntosh, and Sheridan.

== Lieutenant Governor of North Dakota ==
Dalrymple was elected as Lieutenant Governor of North Dakota in 2000 on the Republican ticket with John Hoeven. He was re-elected as Lieutenant Governor in 2004 and 2008 along with then-Governor Hoeven.

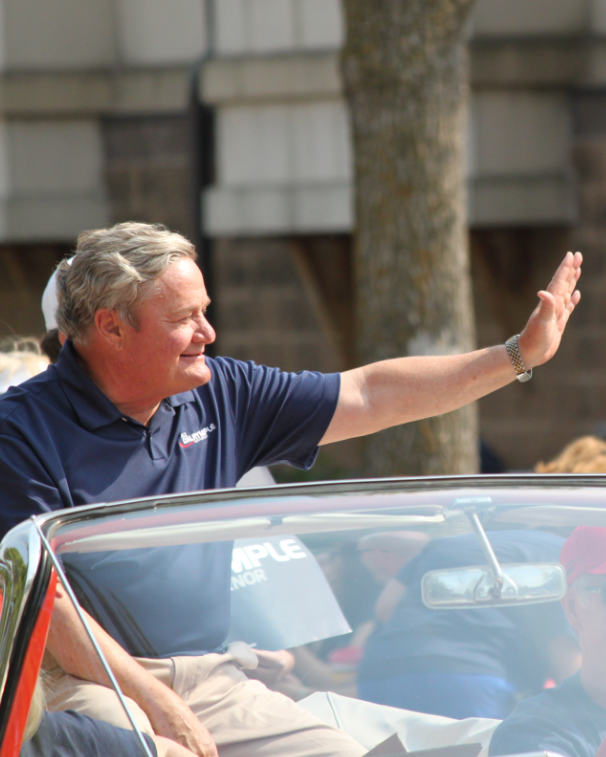
Dalrymple, at a parade in West Fargo.

== Governor of North Dakota ==
Then-Lt. Governor Dalrymple became governor following the resignation of John Hoeven, who was elected to the U.S. Senate on November 2, 2010. The transition took place in accordance with the gubernatorial succession provisions of the Constitution of North Dakota. Two days later, on November 4, 2010, Dalrymple designated now-former U.S. attorney for North Dakota Drew Wrigley as his successor to become Lieutenant Governor, once his transition to the governor's office was completed.

On December 7, 2010, Hoeven officially tendered his resignation as governor to the North Dakota secretary of state, Alvin Jaeger. Later that day, in front of a joint session of the North Dakota Legislative Assembly and before a statewide television audience, Dalrymple was sworn in as governor, and then Wrigley was sworn in as lieutenant governor.

On November 1, 2011, Governor Dalrymple announced on a multi city tour of North Dakota that he would run for a full four-year term as governor, with Wrigley as his running mate. In 2012, Dalrymple handily defeated Democratic challenger Ryan Taylor in the general election to serve a full term as governor.

On August 24, 2015, Governor Dalrymple announced that he would not seek reelection in 2016.

=== 2016 Dakota Access Pipeline protests ===
In 2016, a series of protests were held against the Dakota Access Pipeline (DAPL) by groups including ReZpect Our Water and Native American tribes including the Standing Rock Sioux. Governor Dalrymple called in the North Dakota National Guard's 191st Military Police to deal with protesters.

== Personal life ==
Dalrymple married Betsy Wood in 1971, and they have four daughters.

== Electoral history ==
United States Senate special election in North Dakota, 1992
Party	Candidate	Votes	%
Democratic–NPL	Kent Conrad	103,246	63.22
Republican	Jack Dalrymple	55,194	33.80
Independent	Darold Larson	4,871	2.98

North Dakota gubernatorial election, 2012
Party	Candidate	Votes	%
Republican	Jack Dalrymple (inc.)	200,525	63.10%
Democratic–NPL	Ryan M Taylor	109,048	34.31%
Independent	Paul Sorum	5,356	1.69%
Independent	Roland C. Riemers	2,618	0.82%

== See also ==
- 1992 United States Senate special election in North Dakota

Party political offices
Preceded by Earl Strinden	Republican nominee for U.S. Senator from North Dakota (Class 1); 1992	Succeeded by Ben Clayburgh
Preceded by Rosemarie Myrdal	Republican nominee for Lieutenant Governor of North Dakota; 2000, 2004, 2008	Succeeded by Drew Wrigley
Preceded by John Hoeven	Republican nominee for Governor of North Dakota; 2012	Succeeded by Doug Burgum
Political offices
Preceded by Rosemarie Myrdal	Lieutenant Governor of North Dakota; 2000–2010	Succeeded by Drew Wrigley
Preceded by John Hoeven	Governor of North Dakota; 2010–2016	Succeeded by Doug Burgum
U.S. order of precedence (ceremonial)
Preceded by Martha McSally as Former U.S. Senator	Order of precedence of the United States; Within North Dakota	Succeeded by Jack Markell as Former Governor
Preceded by Bill Ritter as Former Governor	Order of precedence of the United States; Outside North Dakota	Succeeded by Dennis Daugaard as Former Governor
