= 1982 United States Senate election in North Dakota =

- November 2, 1982
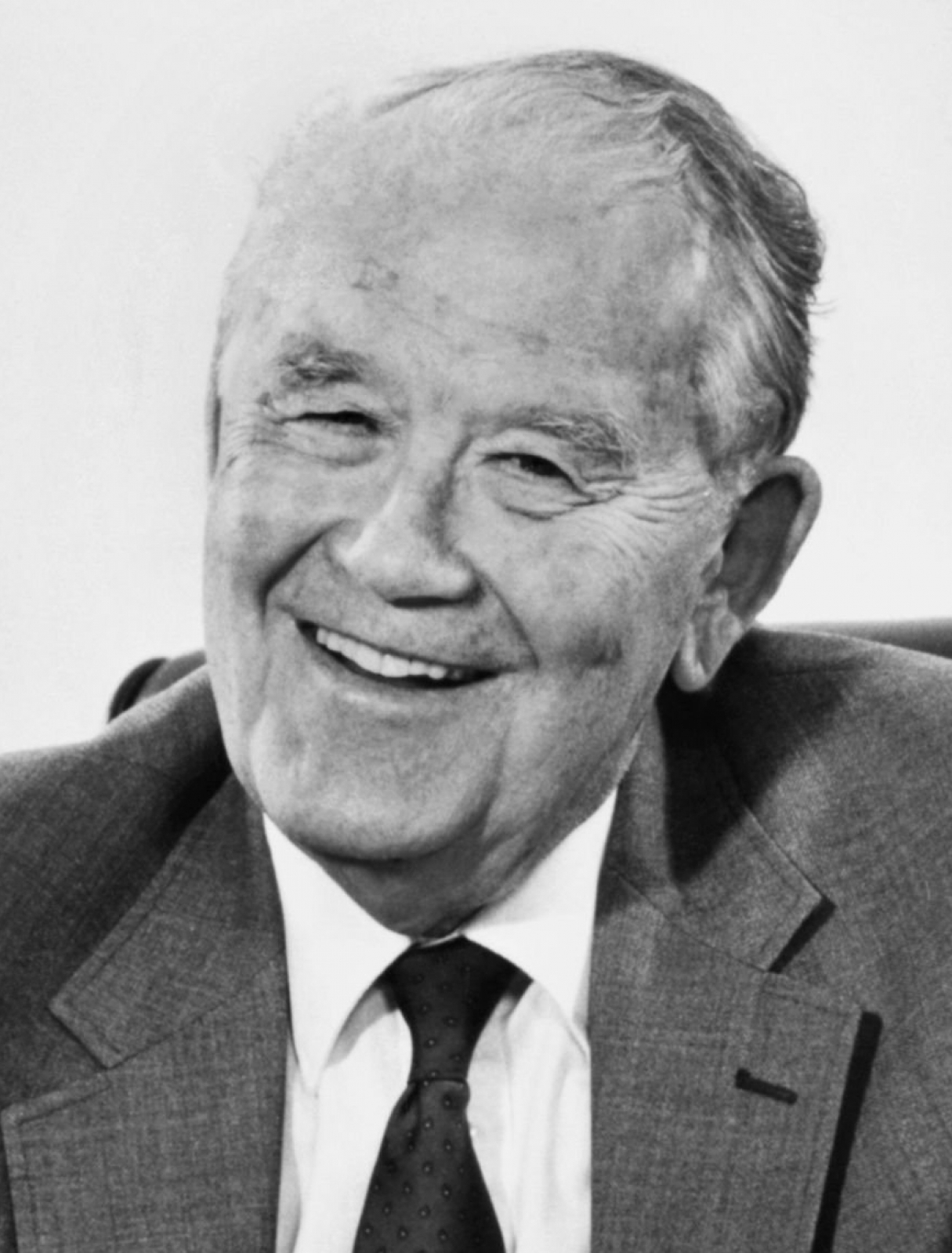

Nominee	Quentin Burdick	Gene Knorr
Party	Democratic–NPL	Republican
Popular vote	164,873	89,304
Percentage	62.82%	34.03%
- County results Burdick: 40–50% 50–60% 60–70% 70–80% Knorr: 40–50% 50–60%
U.S. Senator before election
Quentin Burdick
Democratic
Elected U.S. Senator
Quentin Burdick
Democratic

The 1982 U.S. Senate election for the state of North Dakota was held on November 2, 1982. The incumbent, North Dakota Democratic NPL Party (Dem-NPL) Senator Quentin Burdick, sought and received re-election to his fifth term, defeating Republican candidate Gene Knorr.

Only Burdick filed as a Dem-NPLer, and the endorsed Republican candidate was cattle rancher Knorr. Burdick and Knorr won the primary elections for their respective parties. Burdick's campaign was known for employing more television advertisement spending when compared with his campaigns in the past, as well as making several negative portrayals. Knorr had the support of Vice President George H. W. Bush, who campaigned in the state to support his candidacy. The election was also noted as the first where Burdick's age began to become an issue. Burdick, who was 74 during the year of the election, faced a much younger Knorr, who was 41. At one point, Burdick challenged Knorr to a fistfight to prove his vitality; but the challenge, assumed to be a joke, never occurred. After being defeated, Knorr moved to Washington, D.C., where he took the position of staff vice president with Philip Morris International.

One independent candidate, Anna B. Bourgois, also filed before the deadline, running under her self-created party titled God, Family, and Country. Bourgois would later run for North Dakota's other United States Senate seat, as an independent in 1986, challenging Mark Andrews. She received over 8,000 votes in the election, which is rather high for an independent. Some attribute her large number of votes to the name of her party – which was based on things that North Dakotans valued. Despite the result, Bourgois' campaign still had little impact on the outcome.

== Election results ==
1982 United States Senate election, North Dakota
Party	Candidate	Votes	%
Democratic	Quentin Burdick (incumbent)	164,873	62.84
Republican	Gene Knorr	89,304	34.03
Independent	Anna B. Bourgois	8,288	3.13
Majority		75,569	
Turnout		262,465	
Democratic hold			

Prior to the 1982 Senate campaign, Knorr had been working in Washington, D.C., since 1970, when he worked for the Department of Treasury. He began working in Washington, D.C., residing in McLean, Virginia, after receiving a Juris Doctor from Northwestern University, where he was celebrated in debate. From Treasury, he worked as a lobbyist with Charls E. Walker Associates.

== See also ==
- 1982 United States Senate elections
