= 1956 United States Senate election in North Dakota =

- November 6, 1956
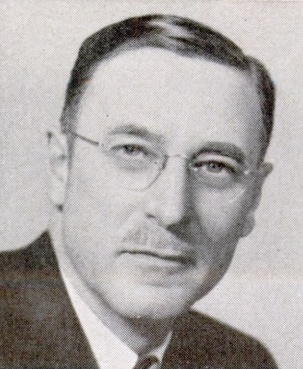

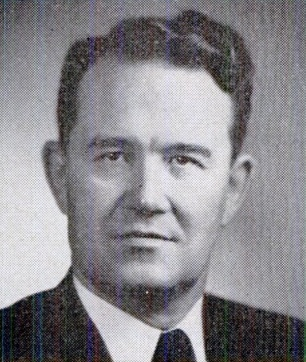
Nominee	Milton Young	Quentin Burdick
Party	Republican	Democratic–NPL
Popular vote	155,305	87,919
Percentage	63.61%	36.01%
- County results Young: 40–50% 50–60% 60–70% 70–80% 80–90%
U.S. senator before election
Milton Young
Republican
Elected U.S. Senator
Milton Young
Republican

The 1956 U.S. Senate election in North Dakota was held November 6, 1956. The incumbent, Republican Senator Milton Young, sought and received re-election to his third term, defeating North Dakota Democratic-NPL Party candidate Quentin N. Burdick, son of North Dakota congressman Usher L. Burdick.

Only Young filed as a Republican, and the endorsed Democratic candidate was Quentin Burdick, the son of well-known politician Usher Burdick, and former candidate for Governor of North Dakota. Young and Burdick won the primary elections for their respective parties.

This election served as Burdick's last electoral loss. He would later be elected to the state's House district in 1958, and then to the other Senate seat in 1960, where he would serve for 32 years until his death in 1992.

One independent candidate, Arthur C. Townley, also filed before the deadline. Townley would later seek the state's other senate seat in 1958 (see election), and was known for creating the National Non-Partisan League.

== Election results ==
United States Senate election in North Dakota, 1956
Party	Candidate	Votes	%	±%
Republican	Milton Young (incumbent)	155,305	63.61%	
Democratic–NPL	Quentin Burdick	87,919	36.01%	
Independent	Arthur C. Townley	937	0.38%	
Majority				
Turnout		244,161		

== See also ==
- 1956 United States Senate elections
