= Scott Stofferahn =

American politician

Scott Stofferahn is a former member of the North Dakota State House of Representatives from 1982 to 1992. From 1993 to 2001 he was executive director of the North Dakota Farm Service Agency.

== Career ==
Stofferahn is the chief executive officer, chief financial officer and executive vice president of Golden Growers Cooperative since October 15, 2012. Since March 2001, Mr. Stofferahn has worked as the state director for North Dakota Senate Senator Kent Conrad.

== Education ==
He has a Bachelor of Science degree from North Dakota State University.
