= 1958 United States Senate election in North Dakota =

- November 4, 1958
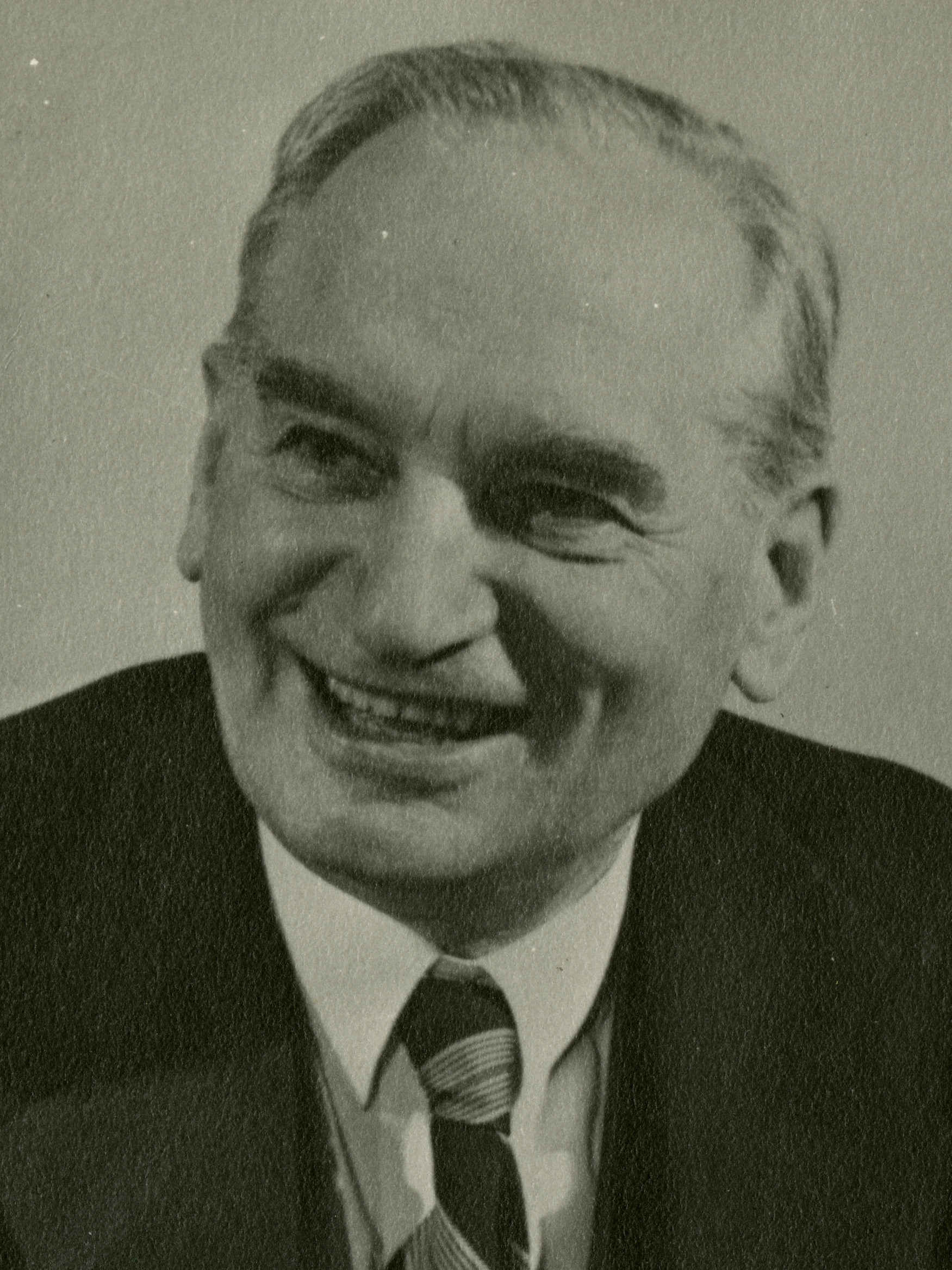

| Nominee | William Langer | Raymond Vendsel |
| Party | Republican | Democratic–NPL |
| Popular vote | 117,070 | 84,892 |
| Percentage | 57.21% | 41.49% |
- County results Langer: 50–60% 60–70% 70–80% 80–90% Vendsel: 40–50% 50–60% 60–70%
U.S. senator before election
William Langer
Republican
Elected U.S. Senator
William Langer
Republican

The 1958 United States Senate election in North Dakota took place on November 4, 1958, to elect a member of the United States Senate to represent the State of North Dakota, concurrently with other Class 1 elections to the Senate and various other federal, state, and local elections.

Incumbent Republican Senator William Langer was re-elected to a fourth term, defeating a primary challenge from Lieutenant Governor Francis Clyde Duffy and winning the general election with 57.21% of the vote, defeating Democratic-NPL candidate Raymond G. Vendsel who won 41.49% of the vote. Two independent candidates, Arthur C. Townley and Custer Solem, also ran, had minimal impact on the outcome of the election, winning 1,700 (0.83%) and 973 (0.48%) votes, respectively. Townley was known as the creator of the National Non-Partisan League, and had previously sought North Dakota's other senate seat in 1956. This was the last time North Dakota's class 1 seat was won by a Republican until Kevin Cramer won it in 2018.

== Election results ==
1958 United States Senate election in North Dakota
| Party | Candidate | Votes | % | ±% |
|---|---|---|---|---|
| Republican | William Langer (incumbent) | 117,070 | 57.21% | −9.14% |
| Democratic–NPL | Raymond G. Vensel | 84,892 | 41.49% | +18.23% |
| Independent | Arthur C. Townley | 1,700 | 0.83% | N/A |
| Independent | Custer Solem | 973 | 0.48% | N/A |
| Majority | | 32,178 | 15.72% | −27.37% |
| Total votes | | 204,635 | 100.00% | N/A |
| Republican hold | | | | |

== See also ==
- 1958 United States Senate elections
