= 1960 United States Senate special election in North Dakota =

- June 28, 1960
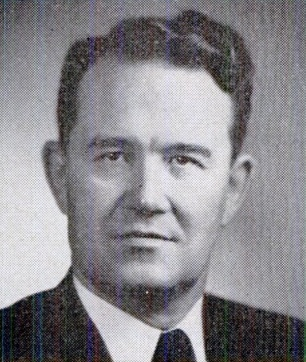

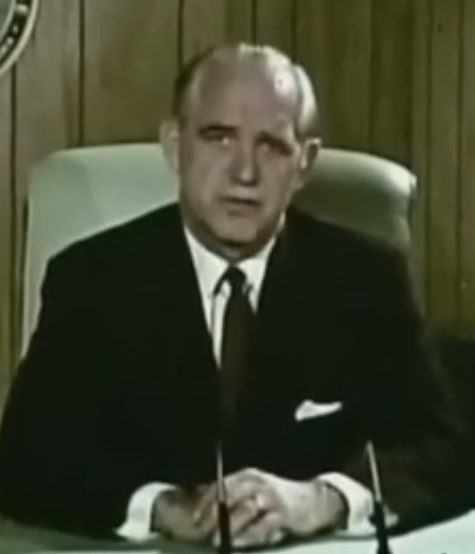
Nominee	Quentin Burdick	John E. Davis
Party	Democratic–NPL	Republican
Popular vote	104,593	103,475
Percentage	49.72%	49.19%
- County results Burdick: 40–50% 50–60% 60–70% Davis: 40–50% 50–60% 60–70%
U.S. senator before election
Norman Brunsdale
Republican
Elected U.S. Senator
Quentin Burdick
Democratic

The 1960 Special U.S. Senate election in North Dakota was held June 28, 1960, to fill the United States Senate seat vacated by the late William Langer. Langer died in office on November 8, 1959, and Clarence Norman Brunsdale, a former Governor of North Dakota, was temporarily appointed to the seat on November 19 of that year until the special election was held. North Dakota Democratic-NPL Party candidate Quentin N. Burdick faced Republican John E. Davis for election to the seat. Davis had been serving as Governor of the state since 1957.

Davis had been very popular during his tenure as Governor of the state, and Burdick had been serving in North Dakota's at-large congressional district for the past two years. His father, Usher L. Burdick, who represented North Dakota for twenty years in the United States House of Representatives, died during the campaign. This race between two popular candidates made for the second-closest race in the history of North Dakota's U.S. Senate elections, with Burdick being determined the winner by 1,118 votes.

Two independent candidates, Eugene Van Der Hoeven and Clarence Haggard, also filed before the deadline and could have played a factor in determining the outcome since their total votes were more than double that of the 1,118 votes that made Burdick the winner. Haggard later tried again for one of the state's senate seats in 1976. Democrats won this seat for the first time since 1899, making Burdick the first popularly elected Democrat to hold this seat. Furthermore, Democrats held this seat until 2018.

== Election results ==
1960 United States Senate special election, North Dakota
Party	Candidate	Votes	%
Democratic–NPL	Quentin Burdick	104,593	49.72%
Republican	John E. Davis	103,475	49.19%
Independent	Eugene Van Der Hoeven	1,337	0.64%
Independent	Clarence Haggard	934	0.45%
Majority		1,118	0.53%
Turnout		163,311	

== See also ==
- United States Senate elections, 1960 and 1961
