= United States Senate Committee on the Budget =

Standing committee of the U.S. Senate

Senate Budget Committee
Standing committee
- Active United States Senate; 119th Congress

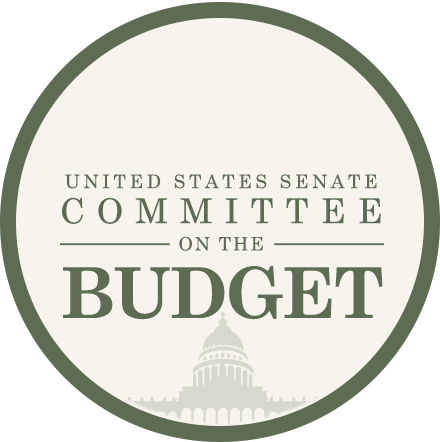

History
- Formed: 1974

Leadership
- Chair: Ron Johnson (R); Since July 21, 2026
- Ranking Member: Jeff Merkley (D); Since January 3, 2025

Structure
- Seats: 21
- Political parties: Majority (11): Republican (11); Minority (10): Democratic (9); Independent (1)

Jurisdiction
- Policy areas: Budgetary policy and process, Fiscal policy, Government spending, Public debt, Tax expenditures
- Oversight authority: Congressional Budget Office
- House counterpart: House Budget Committee

Meeting place
- 608 Dirksen Senate Office Building; Washington, DC 20510

Website
- www.budget.senate.gov

Rules
- Rules of the Committee on the Budget

The United States Senate Committee on the Budget was established by the Congressional Budget and Impoundment Control Act of 1974. It is responsible for drafting Congress's annual budget plan and monitoring action on the budget for the Federal Government. The committee has jurisdiction over the Congressional Budget Office. The committee briefly operated as a special committee from 1919 to 1920 during the 66th Congress, before being made a standing committee in 1974.

The position of Chair is Ron Johnson of Wisconsin, and the Ranking Member is Jeff Merkley of Oregon.

== Contrasted with other committees ==
The Budget Committee should not be confused with the Finance Committee and the Appropriations Committee, both of which have different jurisdictions: The Finance Committee is analogous to the Ways and Means Committee in the House of Representatives; it has legislative jurisdiction in the areas of taxes, Social Security, Medicare, Medicaid and some other entitlements. The Appropriations Committee has legislative jurisdiction over appropriations bills, which provide funding for government programs.

While the budget resolution prepared by the Budget Committee sets out a broad blueprint for the Congress with respect to the total levels of revenues and spending for the government as a whole, these other Committees prepare bills for specific tax and spending policies.

== 119th Congress ==
Majority	Minority
Lindsey Graham, South Carolina, Chair (until July 11, 2026); Ron Johnson, Wisconsin, Chair (from July 21, 2026) (Note: Johnson has been in the committee since the beginning of the 119th Congress, but he became Chair on July 21, 2026 after the death of Lindsey Graham.); Chuck Grassley, Iowa; Mike Crapo, Idaho; Roger Marshall, Kansas; John Cornyn, Texas; Mike Lee, Utah; John Kennedy, Louisiana; Pete Ricketts, Nebraska; Bernie Moreno, Ohio; Rick Scott, Florida; Darline Graham, South Carolina (from July 21, 2026)	Jeff Merkley, Oregon, Ranking Member; Patty Murray, Washington; Ron Wyden, Oregon; Bernie Sanders, Vermont (Note: Senator is formally an independent but caucuses with the Democrats.); Sheldon Whitehouse, Rhode Island; Mark Warner, Virginia; Tim Kaine, Virginia; Chris Van Hollen, Maryland; Ben Ray Luján, New Mexico; Alex Padilla, California

== Leadership, 1974–present ==
Chairs
Name	Party	State	Start	End
Edmund Muskie	Democratic	Maine	1974	1980
Fritz Hollings	Democratic	South Carolina	1980	1981
Pete Domenici	Republican	New Mexico	1981	1987
Lawton Chiles	Democratic	Florida	1987	1989
Jim Sasser	Democratic	Tennessee	1989	1995
Pete Domenici	Republican	New Mexico	1995	2001
Kent Conrad	Democratic	North Dakota	2001 (Note: At the beginning of the 107th Congress in January 2001 the Senate was evenly divided. With a Democratic president and vice president still serving until January 20, the Democratic vice president was available to break a tie, and the Democrats thus controlled the Senate for 17 days, from January 3 to January 20. On January 3 the Senate adopted S. Res. 7 designating Democratic senators as committee chairs to serve during this period and Republican chairs to serve effective at noon on January 20, 2001.)	
Pete Domenici	Republican	New Mexico	2001	
Kent Conrad	Democratic	North Dakota	2001 (Note: On June 6, 2001, the Democrats took control of the Senate after Senator James Jeffords (VT) changed from the Republican Party to Independent and announced that he would caucus with the Democrats.)	2003
Don Nickles	Republican	Oklahoma	2003	2005
Judd Gregg	Republican	New Hampshire	2005	2007
Kent Conrad	Democratic	North Dakota	2007	2013
Patty Murray	Democratic	Washington	2013	2015
Mike Enzi	Republican	Wyoming	2015	2021
Bernie Sanders	Independent	Vermont	2021	2023
Sheldon Whitehouse	Democratic	Rhode Island	2023	2025
Lindsey Graham	Republican	South Carolina	2025	2026
Ron Johnson	Republican	Wisconsin	2026	present

Ranking members
Name	Party	State	Start	End
Peter Dominick	Republican	Colorado	1974	1975
Henry Bellmon	Republican	Oklahoma	1975	1981
Fritz Hollings	Democratic	South Carolina	1981	1983
Lawton Chiles	Democratic	Florida	1983	1987
Pete Domenici	Republican	New Mexico	1987	1995
James Exon	Democratic	Nebraska	1995	1997
Frank Lautenberg	Democratic	New Jersey	1997	2001
Pete Domenici	Republican	New Mexico	2001	2003
Kent Conrad	Democratic	North Dakota	2003	2007
Judd Gregg	Republican	New Hampshire	2007	2011
Jeff Sessions	Republican	Alabama	2011	2015
Bernie Sanders	Independent	Vermont	2015	2021
Lindsey Graham	Republican	South Carolina	2021	2023
Chuck Grassley	Republican	Iowa	2023	2025
Jeff Merkley	Democratic	Oregon	2025	present

== Historical membership rosters ==
=== 118th Congress ===
Majority	Minority
Sheldon Whitehouse, Rhode Island, Chair; Patty Murray, Washington; Ron Wyden, Oregon; Debbie Stabenow, Michigan; Bernie Sanders, Vermont; Mark Warner, Virginia; Jeff Merkley, Oregon; Tim Kaine, Virginia; Chris Van Hollen, Maryland; Ben Ray Luján, New Mexico; Alex Padilla, California	Chuck Grassley, Iowa, Ranking Member; Mike Crapo, Idaho; Lindsey Graham, South Carolina; Ron Johnson, Wisconsin; Mitt Romney, Utah; Roger Marshall, Kansas; Mike Braun, Indiana; John Kennedy, Louisiana; Rick Scott, Florida; Mike Lee, Utah

=== 117th Congress ===
Majority	Minority
Bernie Sanders, Vermont, Chair; Patty Murray, Washington; Ron Wyden, Oregon; Debbie Stabenow, Michigan; Sheldon Whitehouse, Rhode Island; Mark Warner, Virginia; Jeff Merkley, Oregon; Tim Kaine, Virginia; Chris Van Hollen, Maryland; Ben Ray Luján, New Mexico; Alex Padilla, California	Lindsey Graham, South Carolina, Ranking Member; Chuck Grassley, Iowa; Mike Crapo, Idaho; Pat Toomey, Pennsylvania; Ron Johnson, Wisconsin; Mike Braun, Indiana; Rick Scott, Florida; Ben Sasse, Nebraska; Mitt Romney, Utah; John Kennedy, Louisiana; Kevin Cramer, North Dakota

=== 116th Congress ===
Majority	Minority
Mike Enzi, Wyoming, Chair; Chuck Grassley, Iowa; Mike Crapo, Idaho; Lindsey Graham, South Carolina; Pat Toomey, Pennsylvania; Ron Johnson, Wisconsin; David Perdue, Georgia; Mike Braun, Indiana; Rick Scott, Florida; John Kennedy, Louisiana; Kevin Cramer, North Dakota	Bernie Sanders, Vermont, Ranking Member; Patty Murray, Washington; Ron Wyden, Oregon; Debbie Stabenow, Michigan; Sheldon Whitehouse, Rhode Island; Mark Warner, Virginia; Jeff Merkley, Oregon; Tim Kaine, Virginia; Chris Van Hollen, Maryland; Kamala Harris, California

=== 115th Congress ===
Majority	Minority
Mike Enzi, Wyoming, Chair; Chuck Grassley, Iowa; Mike Crapo, Idaho; Lindsey Graham, South Carolina; Pat Toomey, Pennsylvania; Ron Johnson, Wisconsin; Bob Corker, Tennessee; David Perdue, Georgia; Cory Gardner, Colorado; John Kennedy, Louisiana; John Boozman, Arkansas; Tom Cotton, Arkansas	Bernie Sanders, Vermont, Ranking Member; Patty Murray, Washington; Ron Wyden, Oregon; Debbie Stabenow, Michigan; Sheldon Whitehouse, Rhode Island; Mark Warner, Virginia; Jeff Merkley, Oregon; Tim Kaine, Virginia; Angus King, Maine; Chris Van Hollen, Maryland; Kamala Harris, California

=== 114th Congress ===
Majority	Minority
Mike Enzi, Wyoming, Chair; Chuck Grassley, Iowa; Mike Crapo, Idaho; Lindsey Graham, South Carolina; Pat Toomey, Pennsylvania; Ron Johnson, Wisconsin; Bob Corker, Tennessee; David Perdue, Georgia; Cory Gardner, Colorado; John Kennedy, Louisiana; John Boozman, Arkansas; Luther Strange, Alabama	Bernie Sanders, Vermont, Ranking Member; Patty Murray, Washington; Ron Wyden, Oregon; Debbie Stabenow, Michigan; Sheldon Whitehouse, Rhode Island; Mark Warner, Virginia; Jeff Merkley, Oregon; Tammy Baldwin; Tim Kaine, Virginia; Angus King, Maine

=== 113th Congress ===
Majority	Minority
Patty Murray, Washington, Chair; Ron Wyden, Oregon; Bill Nelson, Florida; Debbie Stabenow, Michigan; Bernie Sanders, Vermont; Sheldon Whitehouse, Rhode Island; Mark Warner, Virginia; Jeff Merkley, Oregon; Chris Coons, Delaware; Tammy Baldwin, Wisconsin; Tim Kaine, Virginia; Angus King, Maine	Jeff Sessions, Alabama, Ranking Member; Chuck Grassley, Iowa; Mike Enzi, Wyoming; Mike Crapo, Idaho; Lindsey Graham, South Carolina; Rob Portman, Ohio; Pat Toomey, Pennsylvania; Ron Johnson, Wisconsin; Kelly Ayotte, New Hampshire; Roger Wicker, Mississippi

=== 112th Congress ===
Majority	Minority
Kent Conrad, North Dakota, Chair; Patty Murray, Washington; Ron Wyden, Oregon; Bill Nelson, Florida; Debbie Stabenow, Michigan; Ben Cardin, Maryland; Bernie Sanders, Vermont; Sheldon Whitehouse, Rhode Island; Mark Warner, Virginia; Jeff Merkley, Oregon; Mark Begich, Alaska; Chris Coons, Delaware	Jeff Sessions, Alabama, Ranking Member; Chuck Grassley, Iowa; Mike Enzi, Wyoming; Mike Crapo, Idaho; Lindsey Graham, South Carolina; John Thune, South Dakota; Rob Portman, Ohio; Pat Toomey, Pennsylvania; Ron Johnson, Wisconsin; Kelly Ayotte, New Hampshire

=== 111th Congress ===
Majority	Minority
Kent Conrad, North Dakota, Chair; Patty Murray, Washington; Ron Wyden, Oregon; Russ Feingold, Wisconsin; Robert Byrd, West Virginia; Bill Nelson, Florida; Debbie Stabenow, Michigan; Bob Menendez, New Jersey; Ben Cardin, Maryland; Bernie Sanders, Vermont; Sheldon Whitehouse, Rhode Island; Mark Warner, Virginia; Jeff Merkley, Oregon	Judd Gregg, New Hampshire, Ranking Member; Chuck Grassley, Iowa; Mike Enzi, Wyoming; Jeff Sessions, Alabama; Jim Bunning, Kentucky; Mike Crapo, Idaho; John Ensign, Nevada; John Cornyn, Texas; Lindsey Graham, South Carolina; Lamar Alexander, Tennessee

=== 110th Congress ===
Majority	Minority
Kent Conrad, North Dakota, Chair; Patty Murray, Washington; Ron Wyden, Oregon; Russ Feingold, Wisconsin; Robert Byrd, West Virginia; Bill Nelson, Florida; Debbie Stabenow, Michigan; Bob Menendez, New Jersey; Frank Lautenberg, New Jersey; Ben Cardin, Maryland; Bernie Sanders, Vermont; Sheldon Whitehouse, Rhode Island	Judd Gregg, New Hampshire, Ranking Member; Pete Domenici, New Mexico; Chuck Grassley, Iowa; Wayne Allard, Colorado; Mike Enzi, Wyoming; Jeff Sessions, Alabama; Jim Bunning, Kentucky; Mike Crapo, Idaho; John Ensign, Nevada; John Cornyn, Texas; Lindsey Graham, South Carolina

=== 109th Congress ===
Majority	Minority
Judd Gregg, New Hampshire, Chair; Pete Domenici, New Mexico; Chuck Grassley, Iowa; Wayne Allard, Colorado; Mike Enzi, Wyoming; Jeff Sessions, Alabama; Jim Bunning, Kentucky; Mike Crapo, Idaho; John Ensign, Nevada; John Cornyn, Texas; Lamar Alexander, Tennessee; Lindsey Graham, South Carolina	Kent Conrad, North Dakota, Ranking Member; Paul Sarbanes, Maryland; Patty Murray, Washington; Ron Wyden, Oregon; Russ Feingold, Wisconsin; Tim Johnson, South Dakota; Robert Byrd, West Virginia; Bill Nelson, Florida; Debbie Stabenow, Michigan; Bob Menendez, New Jersey
