= 2006 United States Senate election in North Dakota =

- November 7, 2006
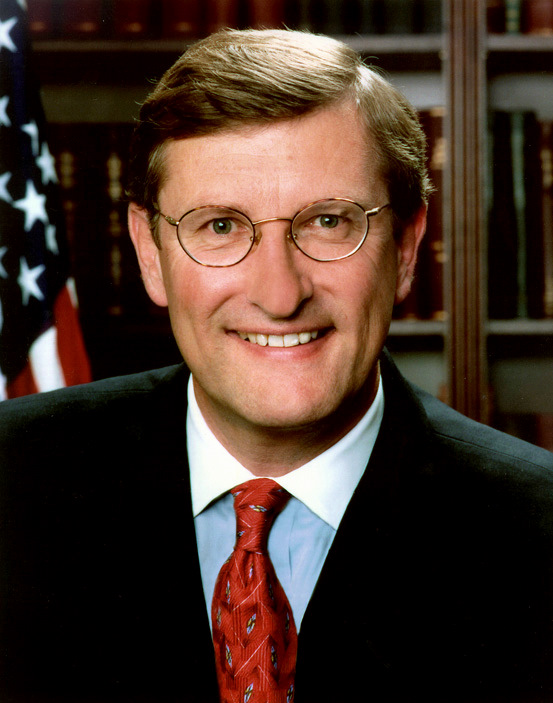

Nominee	Kent Conrad	Dwight Grotberg
Party	Democratic–NPL	Republican
Popular vote	150,146	64,417
Percentage	68.83%	29.53%
- County results Conrad: 50–60% 60–70% 70–80% 80–90%
U.S. senator before election
Kent Conrad
Democratic–NPL
Elected U.S. Senator
Kent Conrad
Democratic–NPL

The 2006 United States Senate election in North Dakota was held on November 7, 2006, to elect a member of the United States Senate to represent the state of North Dakota. Incumbent Democratic-NPL U.S. senator Kent Conrad won re-election to a fourth term. This was one of five Democratic-held Senate seats up for election in a state that George W. Bush won in the 2004 presidential election.

As of 2026, this is the last time where either party won every county for the Class 1 Senate seat in North Dakota.

== Democratic primary ==
=== Candidates ===
==== Nominee ====
- Kent Conrad, incumbent U.S. senator (1992–2013)

=== Results ===
Democratic primary results
Party	Candidate	Votes	%
Democratic	Kent Conrad	3,013	100%
Total votes		3,013	100%

== Republican primary ==
=== Background ===
Popular Republican governor John Hoeven was heavily recruited by prominent national Republicans, including Karl Rove and Dick Cheney to run against Conrad. Both Hoeven and Conrad maintained high favorability ratings per several SurveyUSA polls.

Governor Hoeven declined to run in September 2005. In March 2006, Dwight Grotberg was the first candidate to announce his bid, running on a campaign focused on "...federal support that fosters a strong rural infrastructure."

Grotberg was unopposed in the primary held on June 13.

=== Candidates ===
==== Nominee ====
- Dwight Grotberg, farmer

==== Declined ====
- John Hoeven, incumbent governor (2000–2010)

=== Results ===
Republican primary results
Party	Candidate	Votes	%
Republican	Dwight Grotberg	2,111	100%
Total votes		2,111	100.0%

== General election ==
=== Debates ===
- Complete video of debate, October 17, 2006

=== Predictions ===
Source	Ranking	As of
The Cook Political Report	Solid D	November 6, 2006
Sabato's Crystal Ball	Safe D	November 6, 2006
Rothenberg Political Report	Safe D	November 6, 2006
Real Clear Politics	Safe D	November 6, 2006

=== Polling ===
Hypothetical polling

Poll source	Date(s) administered	Sample size (Note: Key: A – all adults RV – registered voters LV – likely voters V – unclear)	Margin of error	Kent Conrad (D-NPL)	Kevin Cramer (R)	Other	Undecided
Rasmussen Reports	January 25, 2005	500 (LV)	± 4.5%	57%	35%	–	8%

Poll source	Date(s) administered	Sample size	Margin of error	Kent Conrad (D-NPL)	John Hoeven (R)	Other	Undecided
PMR Inc.	August 26–September 3, 2005	605 (V)	± 3.9%	27%	35%	9% (Note: "Someone else" with 7% and "Won't vote" with 2%.)	27%

Poll source	Date(s) administered	Sample size	Margin of error	Kent Conrad (D-NPL)	Wayne Stenehjem (R)	Other	Undecided
Rasmussen Reports	January 25, 2005	500 (LV)	± 4.5%	53%	40%	–	7%

Poll source	Date(s) administered	Sample size	Margin of error	Kent Conrad (D-NPL)	John Warford (R)	Other	Undecided
Rasmussen Reports	January 25, 2005	500 (LV)	± 4.5%	59%	31%	–	10%

== Results ==
General election results
Party	Candidate	Votes	%	±%
Democratic–NPL	Kent Conrad (incumbent)	150,146	68.83%	+7.46%
Republican	Dwight Grotberg	64,417	29.53%	−9.10%
Independent	Roland Riemers	2,194	1.01%	n/a
Independent	James Germalic	1,395	0.64%	n/a
Majority		85,729	39.30%	+16.56%
Turnout		218,154	44.5%	
Democratic–NPL hold		Swing	+8.3	

=== Counties that flipped from Republican to Democratic ===
- Billings (largest city: Medora)
- McIntosh (largest city: Wishek)
- Sheridan (largest city: McClusky)

== See also ==
- 2006 North Dakota state elections
- 2006 United States House of Representatives election in North Dakota
- 2006 United States elections
