= 1994 United States Senate election in North Dakota =

- November 8, 1994
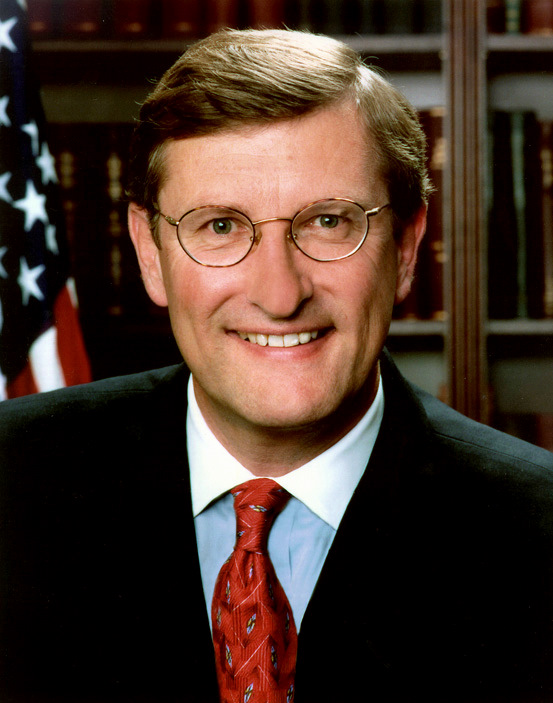

Nominee	Kent Conrad	Ben Clayburgh
Party	Democratic–NPL	Republican
Popular vote	137,157	99,390
Percentage	57.98%	42.02%
- County results Conrad: 50–60% 60–70% 70–80% Clayburgh: 50–60%
U.S. senator before election
Kent Conrad
Democratic–NPL
Elected U.S. Senator
Kent Conrad
Democratic–NPL

The 1994 United States Senate election in North Dakota was held on November 8, 1994. Incumbent Democratic-NPL U.S. Senator Kent Conrad won re-election to his first full term as senior Senator, although technically his second term in the position, having served the end of Quentin Burdick's term after his death. Conrad also had served an additional term as junior Senator from 1987 to 1992.

== Candidates ==
=== Dem-NPL ===
- Kent Conrad, incumbent U.S. Senator

=== Republican ===
- Ben Clayburgh, Air Force veteran

== Results ==
General election results
Party	Candidate	Votes	%
Democratic–NPL	Kent Conrad (incumbent)	137,157	57.98
Republican	Ben Clayburgh	99,390	42.02
Democratic–NPL hold			

== See also ==
- 1994 United States Senate elections
