= 2000 United States Senate election in North Dakota =

- November 7, 2000
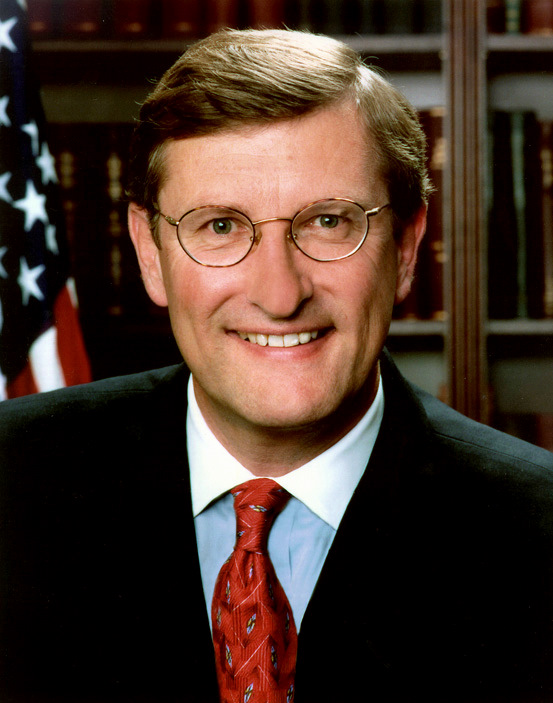

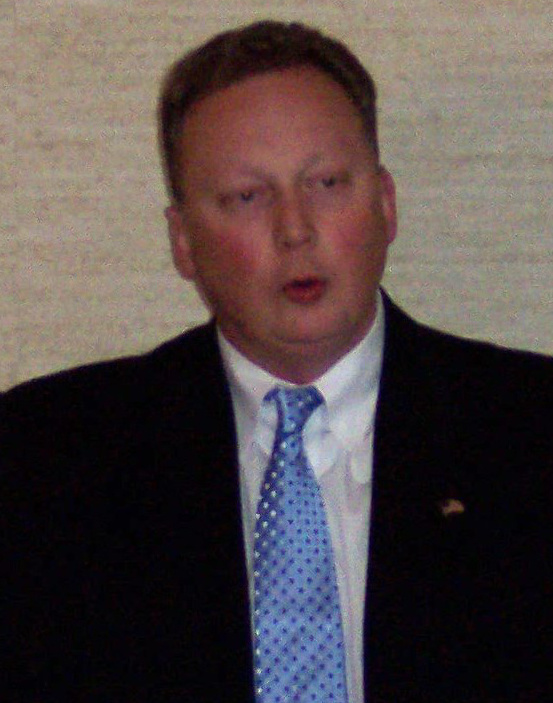
Nominee	Kent Conrad	Duane Sand
Party	Democratic–NPL	Republican
Popular vote	176,470	111,069
Percentage	61.37%	38.63%
- County results Conrad: 50–60% 60–70% 70–80% 80–90% Sand: 50–60%
U.S. senator before election
Kent Conrad
Democratic–NPL
Elected U.S. Senator
Kent Conrad
Democratic–NPL

The 2000 United States Senate election in North Dakota was held on November 7, 2000. Democratic-NPL incumbent Kent Conrad was re-elected to a third term in office over Duane Sand.

== General election ==
=== Candidates ===
- Kent Conrad, incumbent U.S. senator since 1989 (Democratic)
- Duane Sand, Naval Reserve officer (Republican)

=== Polling ===
Poll source	Date(s)	Sample size	Margin of error	Kent Conrad (D)	Duane Sand (R)	Other / undecided (Note: Calculated by taking the difference of 100% and all other candidates combined.)
Rasmussen Reports	October 21, 2000	1,258	—	57%	34%	9%

=== Results ===
General election results
Party	Candidate	Votes	%	±%
Democratic–NPL	Kent Conrad (incumbent)	176,470	61.37	
Republican	Duane Sand	111,069	38.63	
Majority		65,401		
Turnout		287,539	61.71	

== See also ==
- 2000 United States Senate elections
