= List of United States senators from North Dakota =

Current delegation

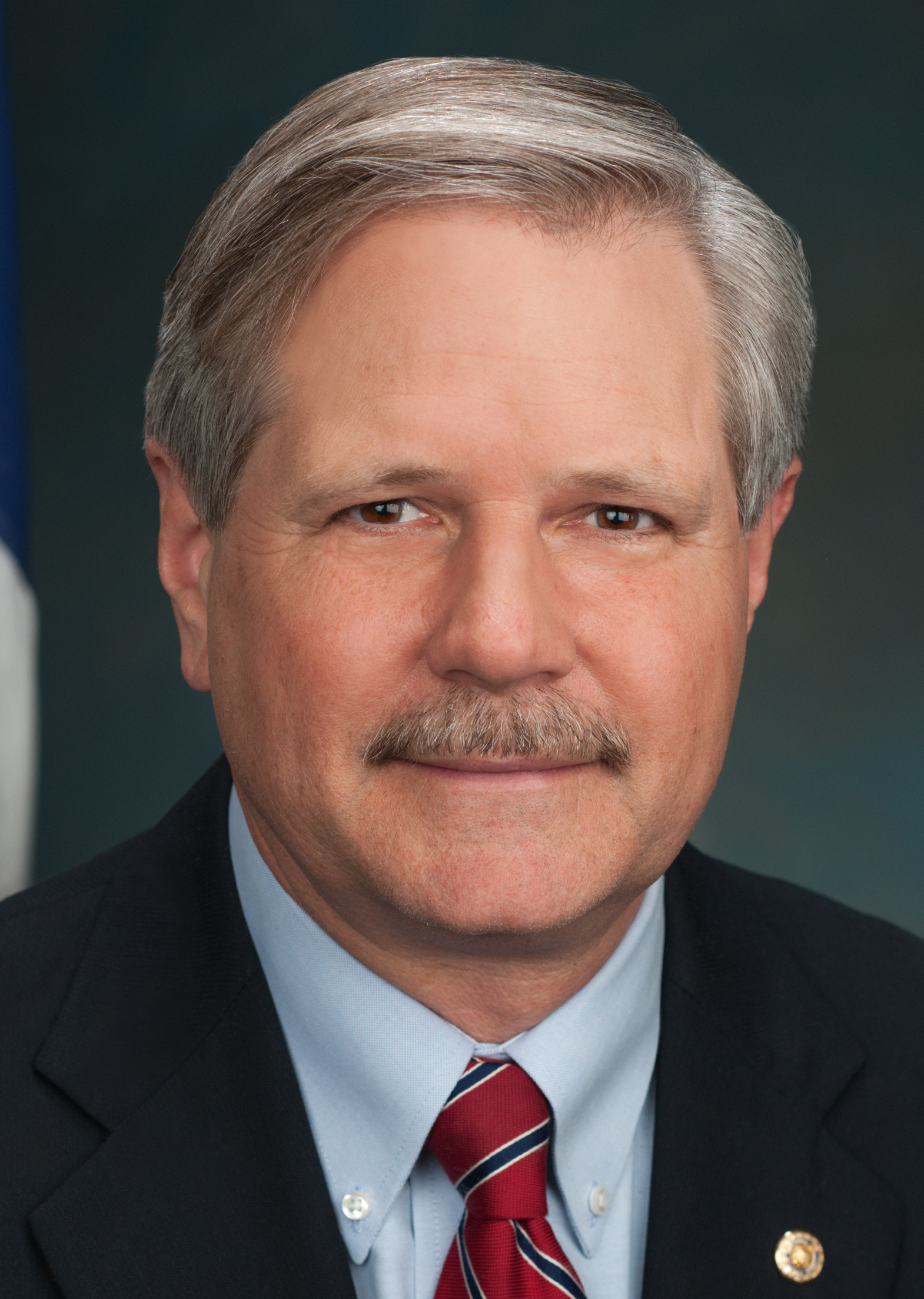
John Hoeven
(R)

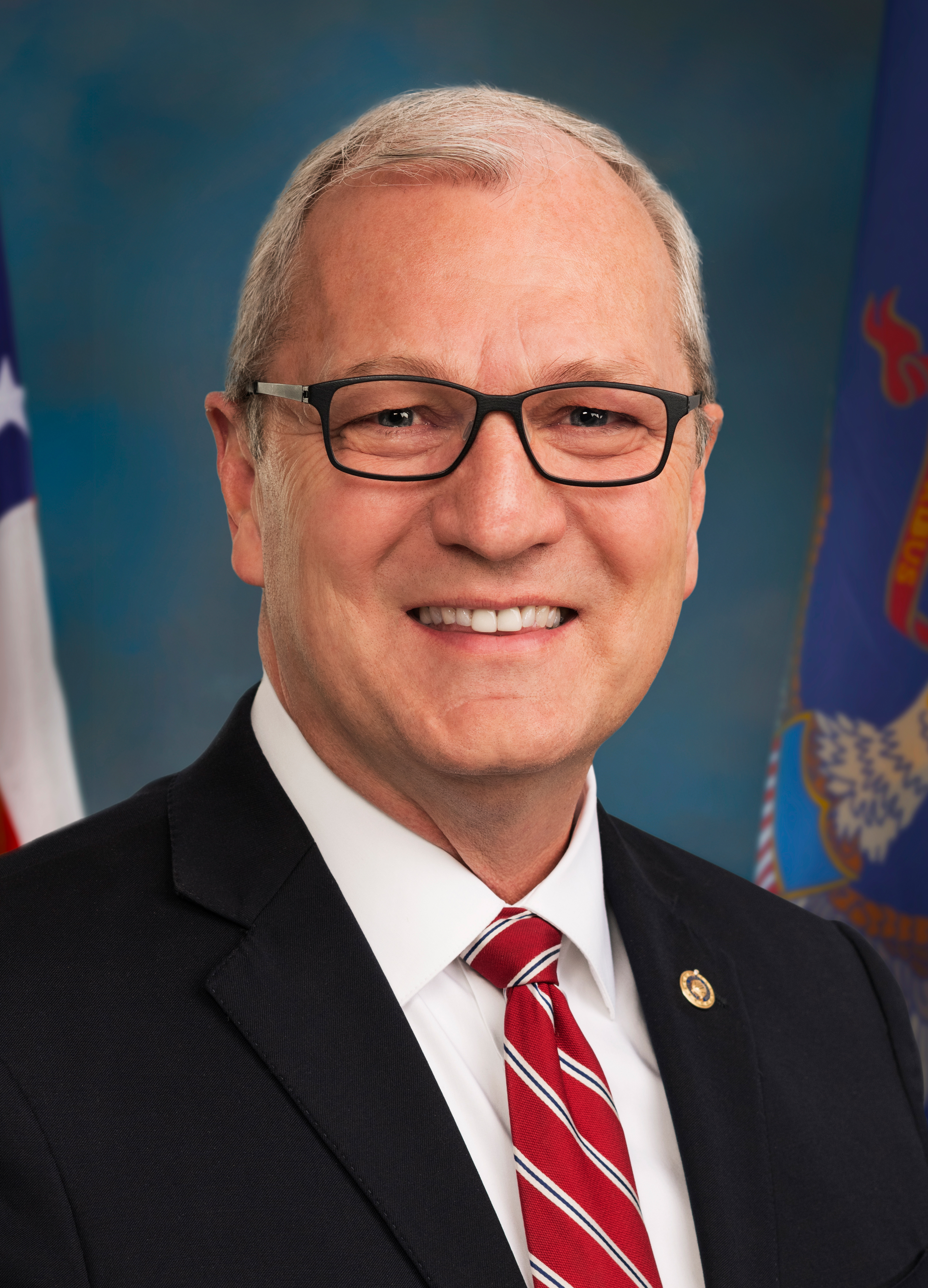
Kevin Cramer
(R)

(ordered by seniority)

North Dakota was admitted to the Union on November 2, 1889, and elects U.S. senators to class 1 and class 3. Its current senators in Congress are Republicans John Hoeven (since 2011) and Kevin Cramer (since 2019). Milton Young was North Dakota's longest-serving senator (1945–1981).

== List of senators ==
Class 1 Class 1 senators belong to the electoral cycle that most recently had regular elections in 2006, 2012, 2018, and 2024. The next election will be in 2030.						C	Class 3 Class 3 senators belong to the electoral cycle that most recently had regular elections in 2004, 2010, 2016, and 2022. The next election will be in 2028.					
#	Senator	Party	Dates in office	Electoral history	T	C	T	Electoral history	Dates in office	Party	Senator	#
Vacant			Nov 2, 1889 – Nov 25, 1889 (Note: North Dakota achieved statehood November 2, 1889 but its senators were not elected until November 25, 1889.)		1	51st	1		Nov 2, 1889 – Nov 25, 1889	Vacant		
1	Lyman R. Casey (Jamestown)	Republican	Nov 25, 1889 – Mar 3, 1893	Elected in 1889. Lost renomination.	1	51st	1	Elected in 1889. Lost re-election.	Nov 25, 1889 – Mar 3, 1891	Republican	Gilbert A. Pierce (Fargo)	1
1	Lyman R. Casey (Jamestown)	Republican	Nov 25, 1889 – Mar 3, 1893	Elected in 1889. Lost renomination.	1	52nd	2	Elected in 1891.	Mar 4, 1891 – Mar 3, 1909	Republican	Henry C. Hansbrough (Devils Lake)	2
2	William N. Roach (Larimore)	Democratic	Mar 4, 1893 – Mar 3, 1899	Elected in 1893. Lost re-election.	2	53rd	2	Elected in 1891.	Mar 4, 1891 – Mar 3, 1909	Republican	Henry C. Hansbrough (Devils Lake)	2
2	William N. Roach (Larimore)	Democratic	Mar 4, 1893 – Mar 3, 1899	Elected in 1893. Lost re-election.	2	54th	2	Elected in 1891.	Mar 4, 1891 – Mar 3, 1909	Republican	Henry C. Hansbrough (Devils Lake)	2
2	William N. Roach (Larimore)	Democratic	Mar 4, 1893 – Mar 3, 1899	Elected in 1893. Lost re-election.	2	55th	3	Re-elected in 1897.	Mar 4, 1891 – Mar 3, 1909	Republican	Henry C. Hansbrough (Devils Lake)	2
3	Porter J. McCumber (Wahpeton)	Republican	Mar 4, 1899 – Mar 3, 1923	Elected in 1899.	3	56th	3	Re-elected in 1897.	Mar 4, 1891 – Mar 3, 1909	Republican	Henry C. Hansbrough (Devils Lake)	2
3	Porter J. McCumber (Wahpeton)	Republican	Mar 4, 1899 – Mar 3, 1923	Elected in 1899.	3	57th	3	Re-elected in 1897.	Mar 4, 1891 – Mar 3, 1909	Republican	Henry C. Hansbrough (Devils Lake)	2
3	Porter J. McCumber (Wahpeton)	Republican	Mar 4, 1899 – Mar 3, 1923	Elected in 1899.	3	58th	4	Re-elected in 1903. Lost renomination.	Mar 4, 1891 – Mar 3, 1909	Republican	Henry C. Hansbrough (Devils Lake)	2
3	Porter J. McCumber (Wahpeton)	Republican	Mar 4, 1899 – Mar 3, 1923	Re-elected in 1905.	4	59th	4	Re-elected in 1903. Lost renomination.	Mar 4, 1891 – Mar 3, 1909	Republican	Henry C. Hansbrough (Devils Lake)	2
3	Porter J. McCumber (Wahpeton)	Republican	Mar 4, 1899 – Mar 3, 1923	Re-elected in 1905.	4	60th	4	Re-elected in 1903. Lost renomination.	Mar 4, 1891 – Mar 3, 1909	Republican	Henry C. Hansbrough (Devils Lake)	2
3	Porter J. McCumber (Wahpeton)	Republican	Mar 4, 1899 – Mar 3, 1923	Re-elected in 1905.	4	61st	5	Elected in 1909. Died.	Mar 4, 1909 – Oct 21, 1909	Republican	Martin N. Johnson (Petersburg)	3
3	Porter J. McCumber (Wahpeton)	Republican	Mar 4, 1899 – Mar 3, 1923	Re-elected in 1905.	4	61st	5		Oct 21, 1909 – Nov 10, 1909	Vacant		
3	Porter J. McCumber (Wahpeton)	Republican	Mar 4, 1899 – Mar 3, 1923	Re-elected in 1905.	4	61st	5	Appointed to continue Johnson's term. Resigned.	Nov 10, 1909 – Jan 31, 1910	Democratic	Fountain L. Thompson (Cando)	4
3	Porter J. McCumber (Wahpeton)	Republican	Mar 4, 1899 – Mar 3, 1923	Re-elected in 1905.	4	61st	5	Appointed to continue Johnson's term. Lost election to finish Johnson's term.	Feb 1, 1910 – Feb 1, 1911	Democratic	William E. Purcell (Wahpeton)	5
3	Porter J. McCumber (Wahpeton)	Republican	Mar 4, 1899 – Mar 3, 1923	Re-elected in 1905.	4	61st	5	Elected in 1911 to finish Johnson's term, but didn't qualify until resigning from the U.S. House.	Feb 2, 1911 – Mar 3, 1921	Republican	Asle Gronna (Lakota)	6
3	Porter J. McCumber (Wahpeton)	Republican	Mar 4, 1899 – Mar 3, 1923	Re-elected in 1911.	5	62nd	5	Elected in 1911 to finish Johnson's term, but didn't qualify until resigning from the U.S. House.	Feb 2, 1911 – Mar 3, 1921	Republican	Asle Gronna (Lakota)	6
3	Porter J. McCumber (Wahpeton)	Republican	Mar 4, 1899 – Mar 3, 1923	Re-elected in 1911.	5	63rd	5	Elected in 1911 to finish Johnson's term, but didn't qualify until resigning from the U.S. House.	Feb 2, 1911 – Mar 3, 1921	Republican	Asle Gronna (Lakota)	6
3	Porter J. McCumber (Wahpeton)	Republican	Mar 4, 1899 – Mar 3, 1923	Re-elected in 1911.	5	64th	6	Re-elected in 1914. Lost renomination.	Feb 2, 1911 – Mar 3, 1921	Republican	Asle Gronna (Lakota)	6
3	Porter J. McCumber (Wahpeton)	Republican	Mar 4, 1899 – Mar 3, 1923	Re-elected in 1916. Lost renomination.	6	65th	6	Re-elected in 1914. Lost renomination.	Feb 2, 1911 – Mar 3, 1921	Republican	Asle Gronna (Lakota)	6
3	Porter J. McCumber (Wahpeton)	Republican	Mar 4, 1899 – Mar 3, 1923	Re-elected in 1916. Lost renomination.	6	66th	6	Re-elected in 1914. Lost renomination.	Feb 2, 1911 – Mar 3, 1921	Republican	Asle Gronna (Lakota)	6
3	Porter J. McCumber (Wahpeton)	Republican	Mar 4, 1899 – Mar 3, 1923	Re-elected in 1916. Lost renomination.	6	67th	7	Elected in 1920. Died.	Mar 4, 1921 – Jun 22, 1925	Republican (NPL)	Edwin F. Ladd (Fargo)	7
4	Lynn Frazier (Hoople)	Republican (NPL)	Mar 4, 1923 – Jan 3, 1941	Elected in 1922.	7	68th	7	Elected in 1920. Died.	Mar 4, 1921 – Jun 22, 1925	Republican (NPL)	Edwin F. Ladd (Fargo)	7
4	Lynn Frazier (Hoople)	Republican (NPL)	Mar 4, 1923 – Jan 3, 1941	Elected in 1922.	7	69th	7	Elected in 1920. Died.	Mar 4, 1921 – Jun 22, 1925	Republican (NPL)	Edwin F. Ladd (Fargo)	7
4	Lynn Frazier (Hoople)	Republican (NPL)	Mar 4, 1923 – Jan 3, 1941	Elected in 1922.	7	69th	7		Jun 22, 1925 – Nov 14, 1925	Vacant		
4	Lynn Frazier (Hoople)	Republican (NPL)	Mar 4, 1923 – Jan 3, 1941	Elected in 1922.	7	69th	7	Appointed to continue Ladd's term. Elected in 1926 to finish Ladd's term.	Nov 14, 1925 – Jan 3, 1945	Nonpartisan; League	Gerald Nye (Cooperstown)	8
4	Lynn Frazier (Hoople)	Republican (NPL)	Mar 4, 1923 – Jan 3, 1941	Elected in 1922.	7	70th	8	Re-elected in 1926.	Nov 14, 1925 – Jan 3, 1945	Republican (NPL)	Gerald Nye (Cooperstown)	8
4	Lynn Frazier (Hoople)	Republican (NPL)	Mar 4, 1923 – Jan 3, 1941	Re-elected in 1928.	8	71st	8	Re-elected in 1926.	Nov 14, 1925 – Jan 3, 1945	Republican (NPL)	Gerald Nye (Cooperstown)	8
4	Lynn Frazier (Hoople)	Republican (NPL)	Mar 4, 1923 – Jan 3, 1941	Re-elected in 1928.	8	72nd	8	Re-elected in 1926.	Nov 14, 1925 – Jan 3, 1945	Republican (NPL)	Gerald Nye (Cooperstown)	8
4	Lynn Frazier (Hoople)	Republican (NPL)	Mar 4, 1923 – Jan 3, 1941	Re-elected in 1928.	8	73rd	9	Re-elected in 1932.	Nov 14, 1925 – Jan 3, 1945	Republican (NPL)	Gerald Nye (Cooperstown)	8
4	Lynn Frazier (Hoople)	Republican (NPL)	Mar 4, 1923 – Jan 3, 1941	Re-elected in 1934. Lost renomination.	9	74th	9	Re-elected in 1932.	Nov 14, 1925 – Jan 3, 1945	Republican (NPL)	Gerald Nye (Cooperstown)	8
4	Lynn Frazier (Hoople)	Republican (NPL)	Mar 4, 1923 – Jan 3, 1941	Re-elected in 1934. Lost renomination.	9	75th	9	Re-elected in 1932.	Nov 14, 1925 – Jan 3, 1945	Republican (NPL)	Gerald Nye (Cooperstown)	8
4	Lynn Frazier (Hoople)	Republican (NPL)	Mar 4, 1923 – Jan 3, 1941	Re-elected in 1934. Lost renomination.	9	76th	10	Re-elected in 1938. Lost re-election.	Nov 14, 1925 – Jan 3, 1945	Republican	Gerald Nye (Cooperstown)	8
5	William Langer (Wheatland)	Republican (NPL)	Jan 3, 1941 – Nov 8, 1959	Elected in 1940.	10	77th	10	Re-elected in 1938. Lost re-election.	Nov 14, 1925 – Jan 3, 1945	Republican	Gerald Nye (Cooperstown)	8
5	William Langer (Wheatland)	Republican (NPL)	Jan 3, 1941 – Nov 8, 1959	Elected in 1940.	10	78th	10	Re-elected in 1938. Lost re-election.	Nov 14, 1925 – Jan 3, 1945	Republican	Gerald Nye (Cooperstown)	8
5	William Langer (Wheatland)	Republican (NPL)	Jan 3, 1941 – Nov 8, 1959	Elected in 1940.	10	79th	11	Elected in 1944. Died.	Jan 3, 1945 – Mar 3, 1945	Democratic	John Moses (Hazen)	9
5	William Langer (Wheatland)	Republican (NPL)	Jan 3, 1941 – Nov 8, 1959	Elected in 1940.	10	79th	11		Mar 3, 1945 – Mar 12, 1945	Vacant		
5	William Langer (Wheatland)	Republican (NPL)	Jan 3, 1941 – Nov 8, 1959	Elected in 1940.	10	79th	11	Appointed to continue Moses's term. Elected in 1946 to finish Moses's term.	Mar 12, 1945 – Jan 3, 1981	Republican	Milton Young (LaMoure)	10
5	William Langer (Wheatland)	Republican (NPL)	Jan 3, 1941 – Nov 8, 1959	Re-elected in 1946.	11	80th	11	Appointed to continue Moses's term. Elected in 1946 to finish Moses's term.	Mar 12, 1945 – Jan 3, 1981	Republican	Milton Young (LaMoure)	10
5	William Langer (Wheatland)	Republican (NPL)	Jan 3, 1941 – Nov 8, 1959	Re-elected in 1946.	11	81st	11	Appointed to continue Moses's term. Elected in 1946 to finish Moses's term.	Mar 12, 1945 – Jan 3, 1981	Republican	Milton Young (LaMoure)	10
5	William Langer (Wheatland)	Republican (NPL)	Jan 3, 1941 – Nov 8, 1959	Re-elected in 1946.	11	82nd	12	Re-elected in 1950.	Mar 12, 1945 – Jan 3, 1981	Republican	Milton Young (LaMoure)	10
5	William Langer (Wheatland)	Republican (NPL)	Jan 3, 1941 – Nov 8, 1959	Re-elected in 1952.	12	83rd	12	Re-elected in 1950.	Mar 12, 1945 – Jan 3, 1981	Republican	Milton Young (LaMoure)	10
5	William Langer (Wheatland)	Republican (NPL)	Jan 3, 1941 – Nov 8, 1959	Re-elected in 1952.	12	84th	12	Re-elected in 1950.	Mar 12, 1945 – Jan 3, 1981	Republican	Milton Young (LaMoure)	10
5	William Langer (Wheatland)	Republican (NPL)	Jan 3, 1941 – Nov 8, 1959	Re-elected in 1952.	12	85th	13	Re-elected in 1956.	Mar 12, 1945 – Jan 3, 1981	Republican	Milton Young (LaMoure)	10
5	William Langer (Wheatland)	Republican (NPL)	Jan 3, 1941 – Nov 8, 1959	Re-elected in 1958. Died.	13	86th	13	Re-elected in 1956.	Mar 12, 1945 – Jan 3, 1981	Republican	Milton Young (LaMoure)	10
Vacant			Nov 8, 1959 – Nov 19, 1959		13	86th	13	Re-elected in 1956.	Mar 12, 1945 – Jan 3, 1981	Republican	Milton Young (LaMoure)	10
6	Norman Brunsdale (Mayville)	Republican	Nov 19, 1959 – Aug 7, 1960	Appointed to continue Langer's term. Retired when successor elected.	13	86th	13	Re-elected in 1956.	Mar 12, 1945 – Jan 3, 1981	Republican	Milton Young (LaMoure)	10
7	Quentin Burdick (Fargo)	Democratic –NPL	Aug 8, 1960 – Sep 8, 1992	Elected to finish Langer's term.	13	86th	13	Re-elected in 1956.	Mar 12, 1945 – Jan 3, 1981	Republican	Milton Young (LaMoure)	10
7	Quentin Burdick (Fargo)	Democratic –NPL	Aug 8, 1960 – Sep 8, 1992	Elected to finish Langer's term.	13	87th	13	Re-elected in 1956.	Mar 12, 1945 – Jan 3, 1981	Republican	Milton Young (LaMoure)	10
7	Quentin Burdick (Fargo)	Democratic –NPL	Aug 8, 1960 – Sep 8, 1992	Elected to finish Langer's term.	13	88th	14	Re-elected in 1962.	Mar 12, 1945 – Jan 3, 1981	Republican	Milton Young (LaMoure)	10
7	Quentin Burdick (Fargo)	Democratic –NPL	Aug 8, 1960 – Sep 8, 1992	Re-elected in 1964.	14	89th	14	Re-elected in 1962.	Mar 12, 1945 – Jan 3, 1981	Republican	Milton Young (LaMoure)	10
7	Quentin Burdick (Fargo)	Democratic –NPL	Aug 8, 1960 – Sep 8, 1992	Re-elected in 1964.	14	90th	14	Re-elected in 1962.	Mar 12, 1945 – Jan 3, 1981	Republican	Milton Young (LaMoure)	10
7	Quentin Burdick (Fargo)	Democratic –NPL	Aug 8, 1960 – Sep 8, 1992	Re-elected in 1964.	14	91st	15	Re-elected in 1968.	Mar 12, 1945 – Jan 3, 1981	Republican	Milton Young (LaMoure)	10
7	Quentin Burdick (Fargo)	Democratic –NPL	Aug 8, 1960 – Sep 8, 1992	Re-elected in 1970.	15	92nd	15	Re-elected in 1968.	Mar 12, 1945 – Jan 3, 1981	Republican	Milton Young (LaMoure)	10
7	Quentin Burdick (Fargo)	Democratic –NPL	Aug 8, 1960 – Sep 8, 1992	Re-elected in 1970.	15	93rd	15	Re-elected in 1968.	Mar 12, 1945 – Jan 3, 1981	Republican	Milton Young (LaMoure)	10
7	Quentin Burdick (Fargo)	Democratic –NPL	Aug 8, 1960 – Sep 8, 1992	Re-elected in 1970.	15	94th	16	Re-elected in 1974. Retired.	Mar 12, 1945 – Jan 3, 1981	Republican	Milton Young (LaMoure)	10
7	Quentin Burdick (Fargo)	Democratic –NPL	Aug 8, 1960 – Sep 8, 1992	Re-elected in 1976.	16	95th	16	Re-elected in 1974. Retired.	Mar 12, 1945 – Jan 3, 1981	Republican	Milton Young (LaMoure)	10
7	Quentin Burdick (Fargo)	Democratic –NPL	Aug 8, 1960 – Sep 8, 1992	Re-elected in 1976.	16	96th	16	Re-elected in 1974. Retired.	Mar 12, 1945 – Jan 3, 1981	Republican	Milton Young (LaMoure)	10
7	Quentin Burdick (Fargo)	Democratic –NPL	Aug 8, 1960 – Sep 8, 1992	Re-elected in 1976.	16	97th	17	Elected in 1980. Lost re-election.	Jan 3, 1981 – Jan 3, 1987	Republican	Mark Andrews (Mapleton)	11
7	Quentin Burdick (Fargo)	Democratic –NPL	Aug 8, 1960 – Sep 8, 1992	Re-elected in 1982.	17	98th	17	Elected in 1980. Lost re-election.	Jan 3, 1981 – Jan 3, 1987	Republican	Mark Andrews (Mapleton)	11
7	Quentin Burdick (Fargo)	Democratic –NPL	Aug 8, 1960 – Sep 8, 1992	Re-elected in 1982.	17	99th	17	Elected in 1980. Lost re-election.	Jan 3, 1981 – Jan 3, 1987	Republican	Mark Andrews (Mapleton)	11
7	Quentin Burdick (Fargo)	Democratic –NPL	Aug 8, 1960 – Sep 8, 1992	Re-elected in 1982.	17	100th	18	Elected in 1986. Retired, then resigned early when elected to the other Senate seat.	Jan 3, 1987 – Dec 14, 1992	Democratic –NPL	Kent Conrad (Bismarck)	12
7	Quentin Burdick (Fargo)	Democratic –NPL	Aug 8, 1960 – Sep 8, 1992	Re-elected in 1988. Died.	18	101st	18	Elected in 1986. Retired, then resigned early when elected to the other Senate seat.	Jan 3, 1987 – Dec 14, 1992	Democratic –NPL	Kent Conrad (Bismarck)	12
7	Quentin Burdick (Fargo)	Democratic –NPL	Aug 8, 1960 – Sep 8, 1992	Re-elected in 1988. Died.	18	102nd	18	Elected in 1986. Retired, then resigned early when elected to the other Senate seat.	Jan 3, 1987 – Dec 14, 1992	Democratic –NPL	Kent Conrad (Bismarck)	12
Vacant			Sep 8, 1992 – Sep 12, 1992		18	102nd	18	Elected in 1986. Retired, then resigned early when elected to the other Senate seat.	Jan 3, 1987 – Dec 14, 1992	Democratic –NPL	Kent Conrad (Bismarck)	12
8	Jocelyn Burdick (Fargo)	Democratic –NPL	Sep 12, 1992 – Dec 14, 1992	Appointed to continue her husband's term. Was not a candidate to finish the term. Successor qualified.	18	102nd	18	Elected in 1986. Retired, then resigned early when elected to the other Senate seat.	Jan 3, 1987 – Dec 14, 1992	Democratic –NPL	Kent Conrad (Bismarck)	12
9	Kent Conrad (Bismarck)	Democratic –NPL	Dec 14, 1992 – Jan 3, 2013	Elected to finish Quentin Burdick's term.	18	102nd	18	Appointed to finish Conrad's term, having already been elected to the next term.	Dec 15, 1992 – Jan 3, 2011	Democratic –NPL	Byron Dorgan (Bismarck)	13
9	Kent Conrad (Bismarck)	Democratic –NPL	Dec 14, 1992 – Jan 3, 2013	Elected to finish Quentin Burdick's term.	18	103rd	19	Elected in 1992.	Dec 15, 1992 – Jan 3, 2011	Democratic –NPL	Byron Dorgan (Bismarck)	13
9	Kent Conrad (Bismarck)	Democratic –NPL	Dec 14, 1992 – Jan 3, 2013	Re-elected in 1994.	19	104th	19	Elected in 1992.	Dec 15, 1992 – Jan 3, 2011	Democratic –NPL	Byron Dorgan (Bismarck)	13
9	Kent Conrad (Bismarck)	Democratic –NPL	Dec 14, 1992 – Jan 3, 2013	Re-elected in 1994.	19	105th	19	Elected in 1992.	Dec 15, 1992 – Jan 3, 2011	Democratic –NPL	Byron Dorgan (Bismarck)	13
9	Kent Conrad (Bismarck)	Democratic –NPL	Dec 14, 1992 – Jan 3, 2013	Re-elected in 1994.	19	106th	20	Re-elected in 1998.	Dec 15, 1992 – Jan 3, 2011	Democratic –NPL	Byron Dorgan (Bismarck)	13
9	Kent Conrad (Bismarck)	Democratic –NPL	Dec 14, 1992 – Jan 3, 2013	Re-elected in 2000.	20	107th	20	Re-elected in 1998.	Dec 15, 1992 – Jan 3, 2011	Democratic –NPL	Byron Dorgan (Bismarck)	13
9	Kent Conrad (Bismarck)	Democratic –NPL	Dec 14, 1992 – Jan 3, 2013	Re-elected in 2000.	20	108th	20	Re-elected in 1998.	Dec 15, 1992 – Jan 3, 2011	Democratic –NPL	Byron Dorgan (Bismarck)	13
9	Kent Conrad (Bismarck)	Democratic –NPL	Dec 14, 1992 – Jan 3, 2013	Re-elected in 2000.	20	109th	21	Re-elected in 2004. Retired.	Dec 15, 1992 – Jan 3, 2011	Democratic –NPL	Byron Dorgan (Bismarck)	13
9	Kent Conrad (Bismarck)	Democratic –NPL	Dec 14, 1992 – Jan 3, 2013	Re-elected in 2006. Retired.	21	110th	21	Re-elected in 2004. Retired.	Dec 15, 1992 – Jan 3, 2011	Democratic –NPL	Byron Dorgan (Bismarck)	13
9	Kent Conrad (Bismarck)	Democratic –NPL	Dec 14, 1992 – Jan 3, 2013	Re-elected in 2006. Retired.	21	111th	21	Re-elected in 2004. Retired.	Dec 15, 1992 – Jan 3, 2011	Democratic –NPL	Byron Dorgan (Bismarck)	13
9	Kent Conrad (Bismarck)	Democratic –NPL	Dec 14, 1992 – Jan 3, 2013	Re-elected in 2006. Retired.	21	112th	22	Elected in 2010.	Jan 3, 2011 – present	Republican	John Hoeven (Bismarck)	14
10	Heidi Heitkamp (Mandan)	Democratic –NPL	Jan 3, 2013 – Jan 3, 2019	Elected in 2012. Lost re-election.	22	113th	22	Elected in 2010.	Jan 3, 2011 – present	Republican	John Hoeven (Bismarck)	14
10	Heidi Heitkamp (Mandan)	Democratic –NPL	Jan 3, 2013 – Jan 3, 2019	Elected in 2012. Lost re-election.	22	114th	22	Elected in 2010.	Jan 3, 2011 – present	Republican	John Hoeven (Bismarck)	14
10	Heidi Heitkamp (Mandan)	Democratic –NPL	Jan 3, 2013 – Jan 3, 2019	Elected in 2012. Lost re-election.	22	115th	23	Re-elected in 2016.	Jan 3, 2011 – present	Republican	John Hoeven (Bismarck)	14
11	Kevin Cramer (Bismarck)	Republican	Jan 3, 2019 – present	Elected in 2018.	23	116th	23	Re-elected in 2016.	Jan 3, 2011 – present	Republican	John Hoeven (Bismarck)	14
11	Kevin Cramer (Bismarck)	Republican	Jan 3, 2019 – present	Elected in 2018.	23	117th	23	Re-elected in 2016.	Jan 3, 2011 – present	Republican	John Hoeven (Bismarck)	14
11	Kevin Cramer (Bismarck)	Republican	Jan 3, 2019 – present	Elected in 2018.	23	118th	24	Re-elected in 2022.	Jan 3, 2011 – present	Republican	John Hoeven (Bismarck)	14
11	Kevin Cramer (Bismarck)	Republican	Jan 3, 2019 – present	Re-elected in 2024.	24	119th	24	Re-elected in 2022.	Jan 3, 2011 – present	Republican	John Hoeven (Bismarck)	14
11	Kevin Cramer (Bismarck)	Republican	Jan 3, 2019 – present	Re-elected in 2024.	24	120th	24	Re-elected in 2022.	Jan 3, 2011 – present	Republican	John Hoeven (Bismarck)	14
11	Kevin Cramer (Bismarck)	Republican	Jan 3, 2019 – present	Re-elected in 2024.	24	121st	25	To be determined in the 2028 election.				
To be determined in the 2030 election.					25	122nd	25	To be determined in the 2028 election.				

== See also ==
- Elections in North Dakota
- List of United States representatives from North Dakota
- North Dakota's congressional delegations
