= Kent Conrad =

American politician (born 1948)

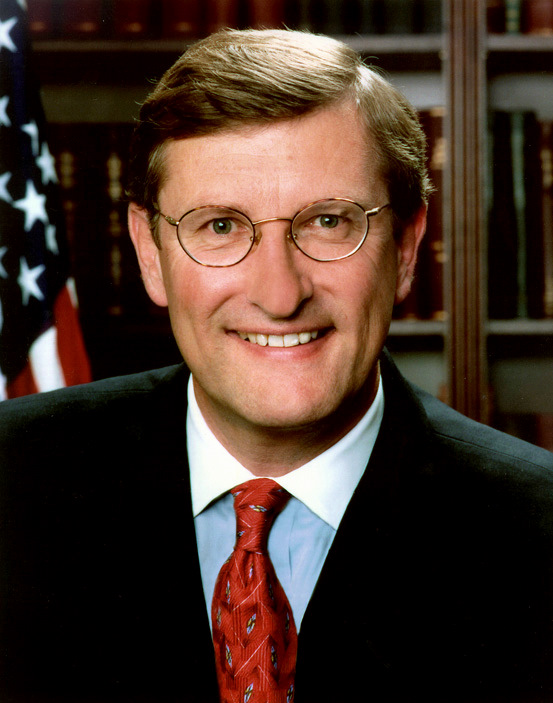
- Official portrait, c. 1990s

Chair of the Senate Budget Committee
- In office January 4, 2007 – January 3, 2013
- Preceded by: Judd Gregg
- Succeeded by: Patty Murray
- In office June 6, 2001 – January 3, 2003
- Preceded by: Pete Domenici
- Succeeded by: Don Nickles

United States Senator from North Dakota
- In office December 14, 1992 – January 3, 2013
- Preceded by: Jocelyn Burdick
- Succeeded by: Heidi Heitkamp
- In office January 3, 1987 – December 14, 1992
- Preceded by: Mark Andrews
- Succeeded by: Byron Dorgan

19th Tax Commissioner of North Dakota
- In office January 6, 1981 – December 2, 1986
- Governor: Allen Olson; George Sinner
- Preceded by: Byron Dorgan
- Succeeded by: Heidi Heitkamp

Personal details
- Born: Gaylord Kent Conrad; March 12, 1948 (age 78) Bismarck, North Dakota, U.S.
- Party: Democratic (D-NPL)
- Spouse(s): Pam Schafer (divorced) Lucy Calautti (m. 1987)
- Children: 1
- Education: Stanford University (BA); George Washington University (MBA)
- Conrad's voice Conrad opening a Senate Budget Committee hearing on promoting job growth. Recorded September 20, 2011

Gaylord Kent Conrad (born March 12, 1948) is a former American politician who was a United States senator from North Dakota. He is a member of the Democratic Party. First elected to the Senate in 1986, he served as chairman or ranking member of the Senate Budget Committee for 12 years.

On January 18, 2011, Conrad announced that he was retiring from politics and would not run for reelection in 2012. He said in a statement that it was more important that "I spend my time and energy trying to focus on solving the nation's budget woes than be distracted by another campaign." Fellow Democrat Heidi Heitkamp was elected to replace him.

Conrad currently co-chairs the Bipartisan Policy Center's Commission on Retirement Security and Personal Savings. He is also a member of the ReFormers Caucus of Issue One. In addition, he serves on the board of directors of the Committee for a Responsible Federal Budget.

== Early life ==
Conrad was born in Bismarck, North Dakota, the son of Abigail and Gaylord E. Conrad. He was orphaned at a young age and subsequently raised by his grandparents in Bismarck. He attended Roosevelt Elementary, Hughes Junior High, and Wheelus Air Base high school in Tripoli, Libya, before eventually graduating from Phillips Exeter Academy. He then went to college at Stanford, and received an M.B.A. from The George Washington University School of Business.

== Personal life ==
Conrad has been married twice. His first wife, Pam, is the sister of former U.S. Secretary of Agriculture and former North Dakota Governor Ed Schafer; they have a daughter, Jessamyn. Jessamyn Conrad is the author of What You Should Know About Politics ... But Don't, subtitled a Nonpartisan Guide, which was praised by Barack Obama and Bob Dole.

On February 14, 1987, Conrad married Lucy Calautti, his 1986 Senate campaign manager, who is now a lobbyist for Major League Baseball.

== Early political career ==
After graduating from college, Conrad became a civil servant, working as an assistant to the North Dakota State Tax Commissioner, Byron Dorgan, who later became his colleague in the Senate. Conrad made his first entry into politics when he ran unsuccessfully for the North Dakota Auditor's office in 1976. In 1980 Conrad succeeded Dorgan as Tax Commissioner. Conrad was state tax commissioner until 1986, when he ran for the Senate.

== U.S. Senate career ==
=== Committee assignments ===
- Committee on Agriculture, Nutrition, and Forestry
  - Subcommittee on Energy, Science and Technology
  - Subcommittee on Domestic and Foreign Marketing, Inspection, and Plant and Animal Health
  - Subcommittee on Production, Income Protection and Price Support
- Committee on the Budget (chairman)
- Committee on Finance
  - Subcommittee on Energy, Natural Resources, and Infrastructure
  - Subcommittee on Taxation, IRS Oversight, and Long-Term Growth (chairman)
  - Subcommittee on Fiscal Responsibility and Economic Growth
- Committee on Indian Affairs
- Joint Committee on Taxation

=== Political positions ===
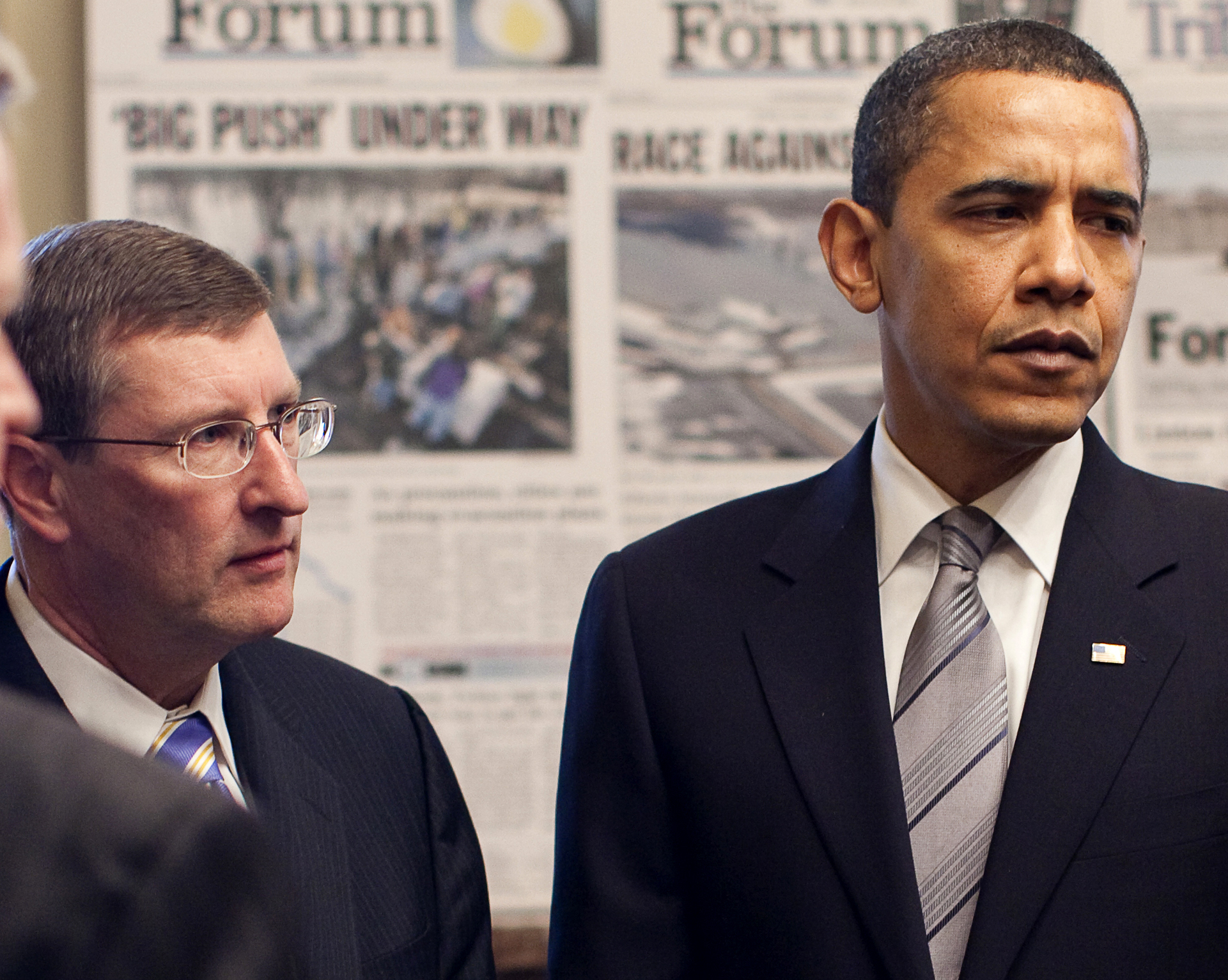
Conrad with President Barack Obama

In April 2006 Time named Conrad one of "America's 10 Best Senators". That same year The American commended him for his knowledge of economic issues. Conrad endorsed Barack Obama in the 2008 Democratic presidential primary.

Conrad was a leading member of the "Gang of 10", a conservative group that pushed for much greater offshore drilling in sensitive environmental areas. He was well known for using charts as visual aids when speaking in the Senate, which earned him the nickname "Godfather of Charts."

==== Health care ====
In the 2009 negotiations over reforming America's healthcare system, Conrad strongly opposed a "public option." The AFL-CIO announced it would fund a primary challenge to Conrad in 2012 if he continued to oppose a public option.

On September 29, 2009, Conrad voted with Senate Finance Committee Republicans against an amendment to a health care bill that would have provided for a public option. He was supportive of the Stupak-Pitts Amendment, which places limits on taxpayer-funded abortions in the context of the November 2009 Affordable Health Care for America Act.

==== Social policies ====
Conrad is more politically conservative than most Democrats. He voted consistently in favor of banning the partial-birth abortion medical procedure. He also opposes public funding of abortion, but voted in favor of lifting the ban on abortions on military bases. Conrad has a mixed record on gay rights. While he personally opposes gay marriage, he voted against a proposed constitutional ban on it and has supported bills that prevent discrimination based on sexual orientation. On January 31, 2006, Conrad was one of four Democrats to vote in favor of confirming Judge Samuel Alito to the Supreme Court.

==== Fiscal policies ====
On April 17, 2012, Conrad, a strong supporter of the Simpson-Bowles plan, announced his plan to offer a version of it that he, as a member of the National Commission on Fiscal Responsibility and Reform, helped to develop. Lawmakers on the Senate Budget Committee could be forced to vote or modify the plan.

Conrad was known for his deep understanding of monetary policies and budget issues. He identifies as a "deficit hawk", supporting a balanced federal budget, but continues to support farm subsidies. He voted against Republican proposals to repeal the estate and alternative minimum taxes. He supported lower middle-class taxes, but increased taxes for people making more than $1 million per year. In 2010 he supported extending the expiring Bush tax cuts "at least until the economy is clearly recovering."

Conrad was very vocal in his opposition to the spending policies of the George W. Bush administration. He contended that Bush worsened the national debt. Conrad also opposed most free-trade measures and strongly supported subsidies to family farmers.

==== Foreign policy and national security ====
In 1991 Conrad voted against approving the use of military force in Iraq. He was one of only 23 senators to vote against the war resolution of 2002. While he initially voted in favor of the USA PATRIOT Act, he has opposed warrantless wiretapping and government's continued use of the Guantanamo Bay detention facility.

=== Countrywide Financial loan scandal ===
In June 2008 it was reported that Conrad had received mortgages on favorable terms for a second home and an apartment building due to his association with Countrywide Financial CEO Angelo R. Mozilo. Conrad acknowledged that he had spoken with Mozilo by phone. In an April 23, 2004, email about one of Conrad's loans, Mozilo encouraged an employee to "make an exception due to the fact that the borrower is a senator." Conrad denied any prior knowledge of such treatment and gave the mortgage discount to charity. Citizens for Responsibility and Ethics in Washington (CREW) called on the Senate Ethics Committee to investigate Conrad. In August 2009, after a yearlong inquiry, the Ethics Committee exonerated Conrad of any unethical behavior in his dealings with Countrywide.

== Electoral history ==
=== Overview ===
In the 1986 election, Conrad defeated the Republican incumbent, Mark Andrews, by 2,120 votes. Andrews had represented North Dakota at the federal level since 1963 (he had previously served in the House before moving to the Senate in 1981).

During the campaign, Conrad pledged that he would not run for reelection if the federal budget deficit had not fallen substantially by the end of his term. By 1992 it became obvious that this would not be the case, and although polls showed that the electorate would have welcomed his reneging on that pledge, Conrad considered his promise binding and did not run for reelection. Byron Dorgan won the Democratic primary election.

Conrad received an opportunity to remain in the Senate when North Dakota's other senator, long-serving Dem-NPLer Quentin Burdick, died on September 8, 1992. Burdick's widow, Jocelyn Birch Burdick, was appointed to the seat temporarily, but a special election was needed to fill the rest of the term. Viewing this opportunity as different from running for reelection, Conrad ran for and won the Democratic-NPL's nomination. He went on to win the special election, and was sworn in on December 14, 1992, resigning his original Senate seat the same day. (Conrad's original Senate seat was then filled by Dorgan, via appointment by the governor on December 15, 1992, to fill the seat for the brief period until he would have been sworn in under normal circumstances.)

Despite North Dakota's Republican leanings, Conrad was comfortably reelected in 1994—a year when Republicans won most of the Congressional seats that were not in heavily Democratic-leaning states.

=== 1986 ===
1986 United States Senate election
Party	Candidate	Votes	%
Democratic–NPL	Kent Conrad	143,932	49.80%
Republican	Mark Andrews (incumbent)	141,812	49.07%
Independent	Anna B. Bourgois	3,269	1.13%
Total votes		289,013	100.00%
Democratic–NPL gain from Republican			

=== 1992 ===
1992 United States Senate special election
Party	Candidate	Votes	%	±%
Democratic–NPL	Kent Conrad	103,246	63.22	+3.77
Republican	Jack Dalrymple	55,194	33.80	−5.26
Independent	Darold Larson	4,871	2.98	N/A
Majority		48,052		
Turnout		163,311		
Democratic–NPL hold		Swing		

=== 1994 ===
1994 United States Senate election
Party	Candidate	Votes	%
Democratic–NPL	Kent Conrad (incumbent)	137,157	57.98
Republican	Ben Clayburgh	99,390	42.02
Democratic–NPL hold			

=== 2000 ===
2000 United States Senate election
Party	Candidate	Votes	%	±%
Democratic–NPL	Kent Conrad (incumbent)	176,470	61.37	
Republican	Duane Sand	111,069	38.63	
Majority		65,401		
Turnout		287,539	61.71	

=== 2006 ===
2006 United States Senate election
Party	Candidate	Votes	%	±%
Democratic–NPL	Kent Conrad (incumbent)	150,146	68.83%	+7.46%
Republican	Dwight Grotberg	64,417	29.53%	−9.10%
Independent	Roland Riemers	2,194	1.01%	n/a
Independent	James Germalic	1,395	0.64%	n/a
Majority		85,729	39.30%	+16.56%
Turnout		218,154	44.5%	
Democratic–NPL hold		Swing	+8.3	

Party political offices
Preceded by Pam Pokorny	Democratic nominee for Auditor of North Dakota; 1976	Succeeded by Jim Engel
Preceded by Kent Johanneson	Democratic nominee for U.S. Senator from North Dakota (Class 3); 1986	Succeeded by Byron Dorgan
Preceded by Quentin Burdick	Democratic nominee for U.S. Senator from North Dakota (Class 1); 1992, 1994, 2000, 2006	Succeeded by Heidi Heitkamp
Political offices
Preceded by Byron Dorgan	Tax Commissioner of North Dakota; 1981–1987	Succeeded by Heidi Heitkamp
U.S. Senate
Preceded by Mark Andrews	U.S. Senator (Class 3) from North Dakota; 1987–1992; Served alongside: Quentin Burdick, Jocelyn Burdick	Succeeded by Byron Dorgan
Preceded by Jocelyn Burdick	U.S. Senator (Class 1) from North Dakota; 1992–2013; Served alongside: Byron Dorgan, John Hoeven	Succeeded by Heidi Heitkamp
Preceded by Pete Domenici	Chair of the Senate Budget Committee; 2001–2003	Succeeded by Don Nickles
Preceded by Judd Gregg	Chair of the Senate Budget Committee; 2007–2013	Succeeded by Patty Murray
U.S. order of precedence (ceremonial)
Preceded by Jeff Bingaman as Former U.S. Senator	Order of precedence of the United States as Former U.S. Senator	Succeeded by Tom Carper as Former U.S. Senator
