= 1976 United States Senate election in North Dakota =

- November 2, 1976
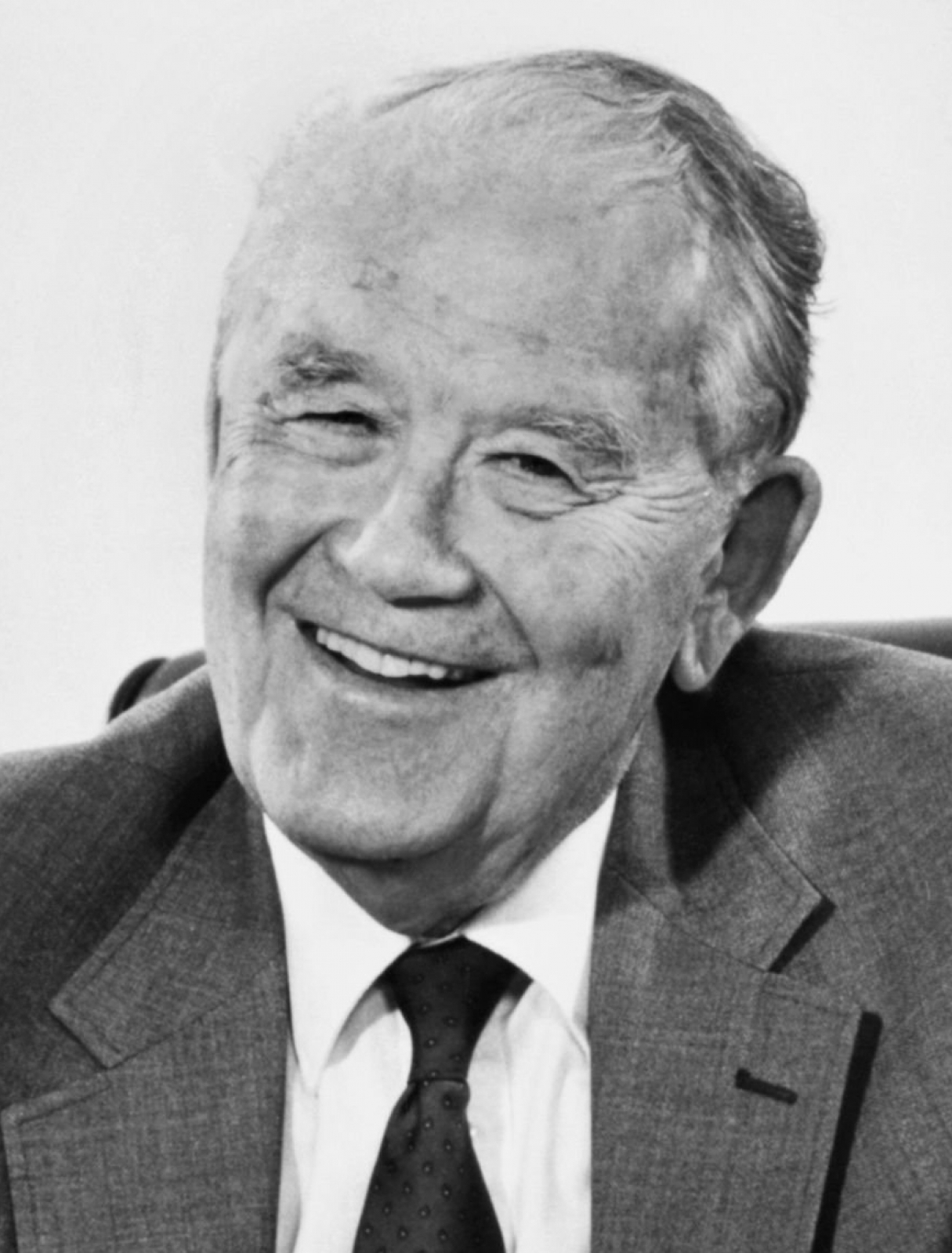

Nominee	Quentin Burdick	Robert Stroup
Party	Democratic–NPL	Republican
Popular vote	175,772	103,466
Percentage	62.10%	36.55%
- County results Burdick: 50–60% 60–70% 70–80% Stroup: 50–60%
U.S. Senator before election
Quentin Burdick
Democratic
Elected U.S. Senator
Quentin Burdick
Democratic

The 1976 U.S. Senate election for the state of North Dakota was held November 2, 1976. The incumbent, North Dakota Democratic NPL Party (Dem-NPL) Senator Quentin Burdick, sought and received re-election to his fourth term to the United States Senate, defeating Republican candidate Robert Stroup.

Only Burdick filed as a Dem-NPLer, and the endorsed Republican candidate was Robert Stroup, a state senator from Hazen, North Dakota. Burdick and Stroup won the primary elections for their respective parties.

One independent candidate, Clarence Haggard, also filed before the deadline under the American Party.

== Election results ==
1976 United States Senate election, North Dakota
Party	Candidate	Votes	%
Democratic–NPL	Quentin Burdick (incumbent)	175,772	62.10
Republican	Robert Stroup	103,466	36.55
Independent	Clarence Haggard	3,824	1.35
Majority		72,306	25.55
Turnout		283,062	
Democratic–NPL hold			

== See also ==
- 1976 United States Senate elections
