= Jocelyn Burdick =

American politician (1922–2019)

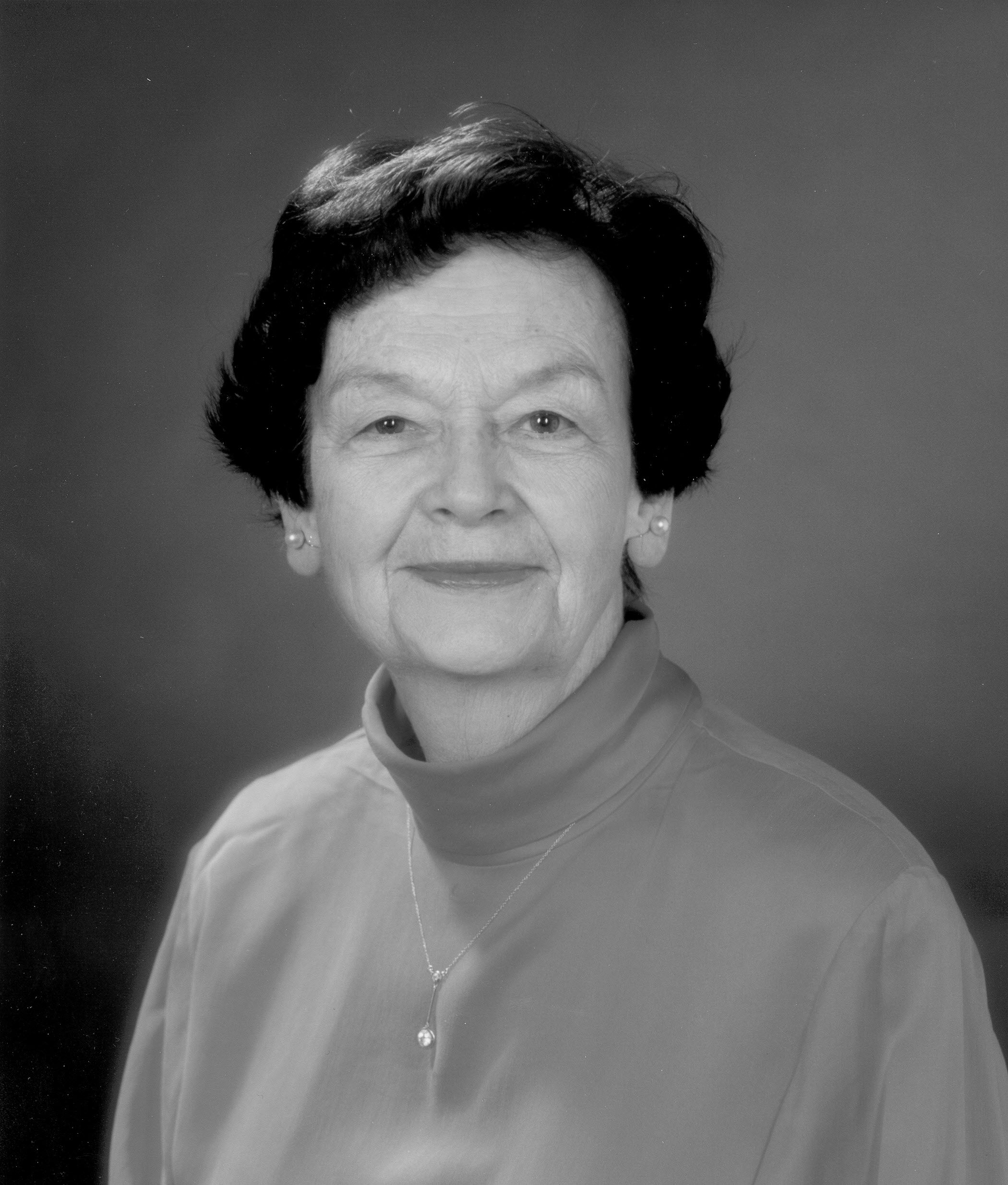

United States Senator from North Dakota
- In office September 12, 1992 – December 14, 1992
- Appointed by: George Sinner
- Preceded by: Quentin Burdick
- Succeeded by: Kent Conrad

Personal details
- Born: Jocelyn Louise Birch; February 6, 1922 Fargo, North Dakota, U.S.
- Died: December 26, 2019 (aged 97) Fargo, North Dakota, U.S.
- Party: Democratic (D-NPL)
- Spouses: Kenneth Peterson (died 1958); Quentin Burdick (m. 1960; died 1992)
- Children: 6
- Education: Principia College (attended); Northwestern University (BA)

Jocelyn Louise Burdick (née Birch; February 6, 1922 – December 26, 2019) was an American politician from North Dakota who briefly served as a member of the United States Senate in 1992. She was the first woman from the state to hold this office. At the age of 97, she was the oldest living former U.S. Senator for the last eight months of her life. She was a member of the North Dakota Democratic–Nonpartisan League Party.

== Early life and education ==
Burdick was born in Fargo, North Dakota, the daughter of Magdalena Towers (Carpenter) and Albert Birch. Her great-grandmother was suffragist and abolitionist Matilda Joslyn Gage. Burdick was the great-niece, by marriage, of L. Frank Baum, the author of The Wizard of Oz, who was married to her great-aunt, activist Maud Gage Baum. She was educated at Principia College and at Northwestern University.

== Early career ==
Prior to her second marriage to Senator Quentin N. Burdick, she was a Republican, but changed her affiliation after the marriage. However, she asserted that she had done it out of her own volition. She would occasionally act as a stand-in for him at speeches, but would make no attempt to interpret his policies or stands.

After graduating from Northwestern, Burdick returned to Fargo working as a radio announcer at KVOX radio. Burdick was engaged in civics throughout her marriage to Quentin Burdick. She was part of the official U.S. delegation to Russia in 1978 and she was a trustee to the Lake Agassiz Arts Council. Burdick helped to found the Democratic Women Plus in the early 1980s. She also recorded public service announcements against drunk driving and drug use in 1989.

== U.S. Senate ==
Upon the death of her husband, Senator Quentin Burdick in September 1992, Jocelyn Burdick was appointed by Governor George Sinner to fill the vacancy in his position until a special election was held. She had been reluctant to fill the vacancy, but agreed to do it for the opportunity to cast some votes her husband would have wanted. She did not run as a candidate for election to the rest of the term. During her brief tenure in office, Burdick supported legislation on pay equity and women's rights. After Kent Conrad took office in December 1992, Burdick retired to Fargo.

Burdick was the first woman from North Dakota to serve in either house of the U.S. Congress. She lived in Fargo, where she remained active in politics. In April 2019, she became the oldest living former U.S. senator upon the death of Fritz Hollings.

== Personal life and death ==
Burdick was a devout Christian Scientist. Burdick's first husband was Kenneth Peterson. She had two children, daughter Leslie and son Birch, with Peterson. Peterson died in 1958 of a heart attack. Two years later she married Quentin Burdick, who was a widower himself with four children. With Quentin she had another son, Gage. Gage died in 1978 from an accident with an electric belt sander. Burdick died in Fargo on December 26, 2019, at the age of 97.

Her son Birch Burdick served as Cass County State Attorney between 1998 and 2022.

== See also ==
- Women in the United States Senate

U.S. Senate
Preceded by Quentin Burdick	United States Senator (Class 1) from North Dakota; 1992; Served alongside: Kent Conrad	Succeeded by Kent Conrad
Honorary titles
Preceded by Fritz Hollings	Oldest living United States senator (Sitting or former); 2019	Succeeded by James L. Buckley
