= Mark Andrews (politician) =

American politician (1926–2020)

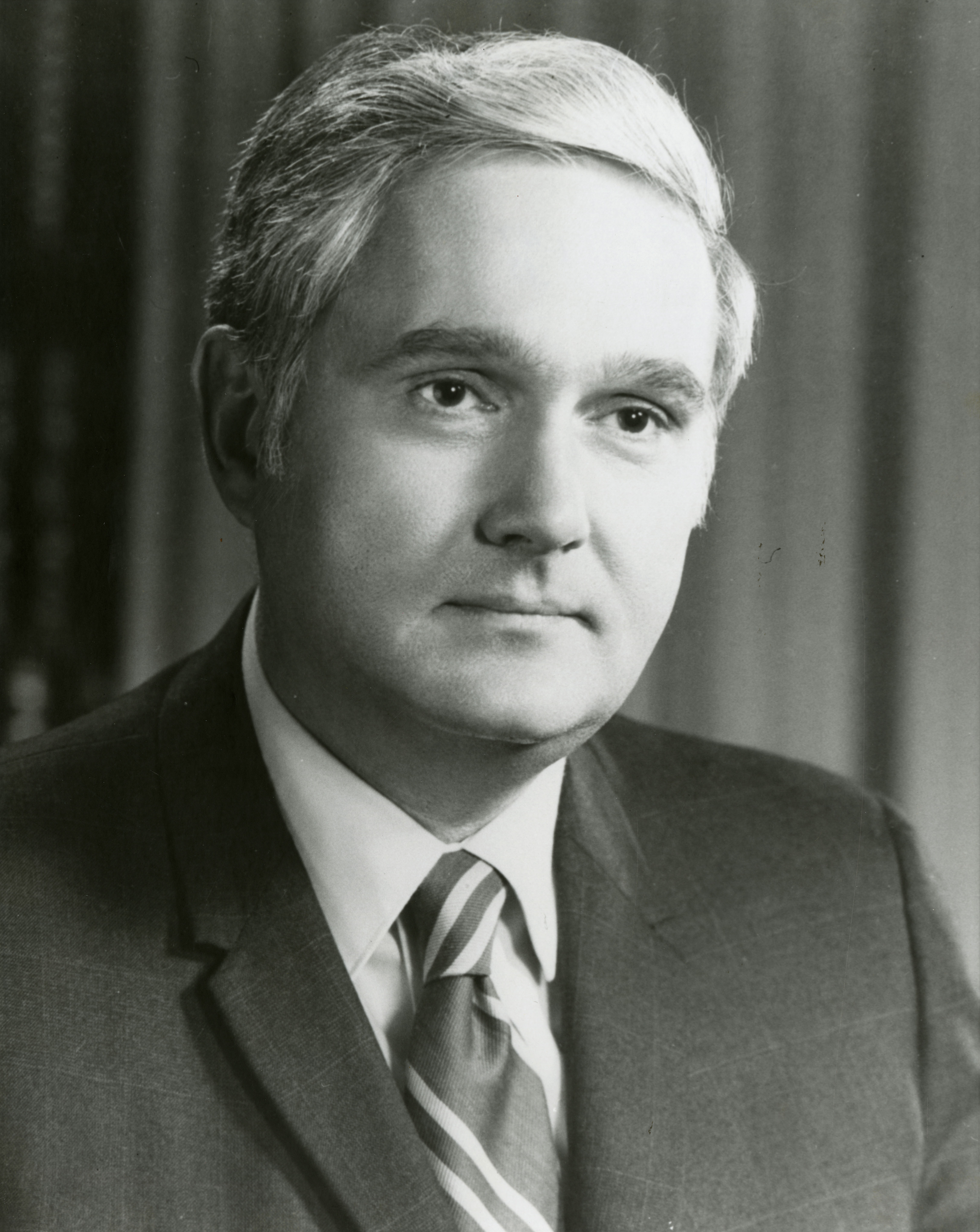
- Official portrait, c. 1975

United States Senator from North Dakota
- In office January 3, 1981 – January 3, 1987
- Preceded by: Milton Young
- Succeeded by: Kent Conrad

Member of the U.S. House of Representatives from North Dakota
- In office October 22, 1963 – January 3, 1981
- Preceded by: Hjalmar Carl Nygaard
- Succeeded by: Byron Dorgan
- Constituency: 1st district (1963–1973) at-large district (1973–1981)

Personal details
- Born: May 19, 1926 Cass County, North Dakota, U.S.
- Died: October 3, 2020 (aged 94) Fargo, North Dakota, U.S.
- Party: Republican
- Spouse: Mary Ann Willming (m. 1949; died 2020)
- Children: 3
- Education: North Dakota State University

Military service
- Allegiance: United States
- Branch/service: United States Army
- Years of service: 1944-1946
- Battles/wars: World War II

Mark Andrews II (May 19, 1926 – October 3, 2020) was an American politician from the state of North Dakota. He was a member of the Republican Party who served in both chambers of the United States Congress, the United States House of Representatives from 1963 to 1981 and the United States Senate from 1981 to 1987.

== Life and career ==
Andrews was born on May 19, 1926 in Cass County, North Dakota, to Mark Andrews I and the former Lillian Hoyler, where he attended public school. In 1944 at the age of 18, Andrews was admitted to the United States Military Academy. He quit in 1946 after receiving a disability discharge. He then attended North Dakota State University at Fargo, North Dakota, where he became a member of the Gamma Tau chapter of the Sigma Chi fraternity, and graduated in 1949.

Andrews then became a farmer. He was a third-generation farmer on a Red River Valley plot that was started by his grandfather.

=== Early political career ===
During the 1950s he began to enter politics, serving on farmers' organizations and Republican committees. In 1962, Andrews ran for Governor of North Dakota, losing to incumbent William L. Guy by 2,000 votes out of over 228,500 cast.

=== U.S. House ===
The next year, he became the Republican candidate for a seat in the United States House of Representatives from North Dakota when a special election was required after the death of Congressman Hjalmar Nygaard. Andrews won the election. He was reelected to a full term in 1964 and served in the House until 1981, being reelected every two years. Andrews supported Nelson Rockefeller in the 1964 Republican presidential primaries. During his time in the House, Andrews voted in favor of the Civil Rights Act of 1964, the Civil Rights Act of 1968, and the Voting Rights Act of 1965. Regarding his support for civil rights legislation, Andrews said: "It was the right thing to do. People needed to be treated with dignity." Andrews was one of thirty-one Republicans in the House to vote in favor of the Comprehensive Child Development Act of 1971.

=== Senate ===
In 1980, Andrews did not run for reelection to the House, but instead ran for the United States Senate seat being vacated by long-serving Republican Senator Milton Young, who was retiring. Andrews won the election with 70% of the vote and served in the Senate for one term, from 1981 to 1987. He was chairman of the select committee on Indian affairs from 1983 to 1987. As Senator and Representative, Andrews was socially moderate to liberal, opposing abortion bans and school prayer, and conservative on economic policies, but was also supportive of subsidies for farmers. Andrews was good friends with fellow North Dakota senator Quentin Burdick, U.S. Senate member Ted Kennedy of Massachusetts, and U.S. House of Representatives member Robert Bergland of Minnesota.

=== Career after Congress ===
In 1986, Andrews lost reelection to North Dakota Democratic–Nonpartisan League Party Tax Commissioner Kent Conrad by 2,120 votes in what was considered an upset, and subsequently retired from electoral politics. He started a consultancy firm in Washington, D.C., but lived in Mapleton, North Dakota. Grand Forks International Airport in Grand Forks, North Dakota, has sometimes been called Mark Andrews International Airport, but usage of the name has declined.

Despite North Dakota's Republican bent at the presidential level, Andrews was the last Republican to represent the state in Congress until 2010, when Rick Berg was elected to the House and John Hoeven to the Senate.

Later in life, Andrews lamented the lack of bipartisanship in Congress, saying: "People from both parties talked to each other in those days, and we got things done. It's damn foolishness now. Nobody compromises anymore. Nobody gets things done now because they don't work together."

== Personal life and death ==
Andrews married the former Mary Ann Willming on June 29, 1949. Together, they had three children, Mark Andrews III, Sarah, and Karen. On July 16, 2020, Mary Ann Willming Andrews died at age 93.

Andrews died on October 3, 2020, in Fargo, North Dakota, at age 94, 79 days after his wife's death.

== See also ==
- 1980 United States Senate election in North Dakota
- 1986 United States Senate election in North Dakota

Party political offices
Preceded by Clarence P. Dahl	Republican nominee for Governor of North Dakota; 1962	Succeeded by Donald Halcrow
Preceded by Milton Young	Republican nominee for U.S. Senator from North Dakota (Class 3); 1980, 1986	Succeeded by Steve Sydness (1992)
U.S. House of Representatives
Preceded by Hjalmar Carl Nygaard	Member of the U.S. House of Representatives from North Dakota's 1st congressional district 1963–1973	Elected statewide at-large
New district	Member of the U.S. House of Representatives from North Dakota's at-large congressional district 1973–1981	Succeeded by Byron Dorgan
U.S. Senate
Preceded by Milton R. Young	U.S. senator (Class 3) from North Dakota; 1981 – 1987; Served alongside: Quentin Burdick	Succeeded by Kent Conrad
Political offices
Preceded by William Cohen	Chairman of the Senate Indian Affairs Committee; 1983 – 1987	Succeeded by Daniel Inouye
