= Quentin Burdick =

American politician (1908–1992)

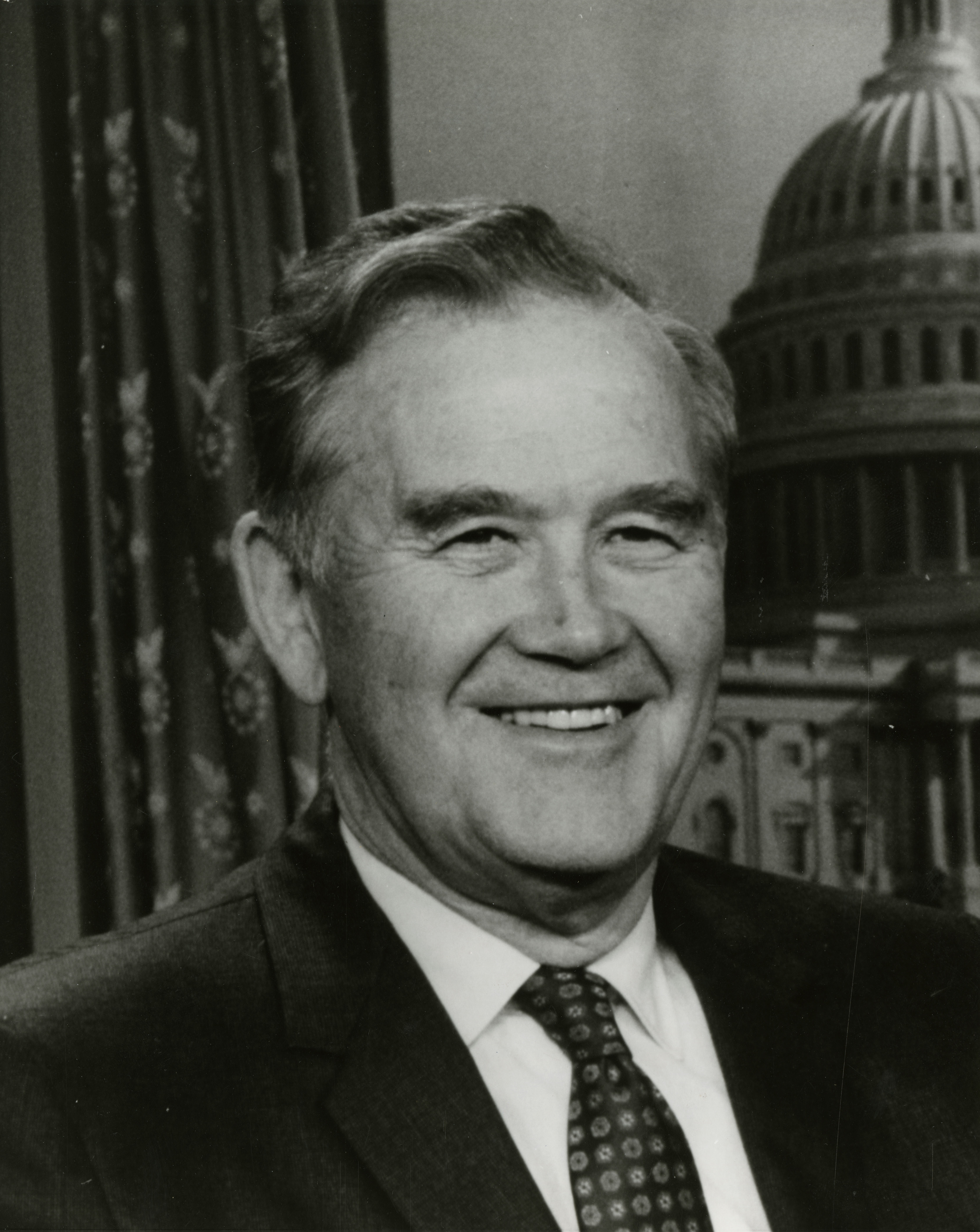
- Official portrait, c. 1975

United States Senator from North Dakota
- In office August 8, 1960 – September 8, 1992
- Preceded by: Norman Brunsdale
- Succeeded by: Jocelyn Burdick
Committee chairmanships
Chair of the Senate Environment Committee
In office January 3, 1987 – September 8, 1992
Preceded by	Robert Stafford
Succeeded by	Pat Moynihan

Member of the U.S. House of Representatives from North Dakota's at-large district
- In office January 3, 1959 – August 8, 1960
- Preceded by: Usher L. Burdick
- Succeeded by: Hjalmar Nygaard

Personal details
- Born: Quentin Northrup Burdick; June 19, 1908 Munich, North Dakota, U.S.
- Died: September 8, 1992 (aged 84) Fargo, North Dakota, U.S.
- Party: Democratic (D-NPL)
- Spouses: Marietta Janecky (m. 1933; died 1958) Jocelyn Birch (m. 1960)
- Children: 5
- Parent: Usher L. Burdick (father)
- Relatives: Eugene A. Burdick (brother)
- Education: University of Minnesota; University of Minnesota Law School

Quentin Northrup Burdick (June 19, 1908 – September 8, 1992) was an American lawyer and politician. A member of the North Dakota Democratic-NPL Party, he represented North Dakota in the U.S. House of Representatives (1959–1960) and the U.S. Senate (1960–1992). At the time of his death, he was the third longest-serving senator (after Strom Thurmond and Robert Byrd) among current members of the Senate.

== Early life and education ==
Quentin Burdick was born in Munich, North Dakota, as the oldest of three children of Usher Lloyd Burdick and Emma Cecelia Robertson. His father was a Republican politician who served as lieutenant governor of North Dakota (1911–1913) and a U.S. representative (1935–1959). His mother was the daughter of the first white settler in the area of North Dakota that lies west of Park River. He was the brother of Eugene Allan Burdick, who was judge of the Fifth Judicial District of North Dakota from 1953 to 1978. His sister Rosemary was married to Robert W. Levering, who was a U.S. representative from Ohio (1959–1961).

In 1910, Burdick moved with his family to Williston, where his father engaged in farming and practiced law. As a child, he enjoyed breaking wild ponies on his father's ranch. He attended local public schools, and graduated in 1926 from Williston High School, where he was class president and captain of the football team.

Burdick had his undergraduate studies at the University of Minnesota, receiving a Bachelor of Arts degree in 1931. During college, he played on the football team as a blocking back for Bronko Nagurski, and was president of the Sigma Nu fraternity. He suffered a knee injury in football that disqualified him from military service in World War II. In 1932, he received his law degree from the University of Minnesota Law School and was admitted to the bar.

== Early career ==
Burdick joined his father's law firm in Fargo, where he advised farmers who were threatened with foreclosure during the years of the Great Depression. He later recalled, "I guess I acquired a social conscience during those bad days, and ever since I've had the desire to work toward bettering the living conditions of the people."

In 1933, he married Marietta Janecky; the couple had one son and three daughters. She died in 1958.

Like his father, Burdick became active in politics and joined the Nonpartisan League (NPL), a populist-progressive group which was allied with the Republican Party. As a candidate for the NPL, he unsuccessfully ran for attorney general in 1934 and 1940, state senator from Cass County in 1936, and lieutenant governor in 1942.

Burdick, who believed the NPL was dividing the state's progressive vote, began to advocate aligning the NPL with the Democratic Party. He subsequently ran for governor of North Dakota in 1946 as a Democrat, but was again unsuccessful. He was a delegate for former Vice President Henry A. Wallace, who ran as a candidate of the Progressive Party, in the 1948 presidential election.

In 1956, the NPL aligned with the Democratic Party to create the North Dakota Democratic-Nonpartisan League Party. That same year, Burdick suffered his sixth and final electoral defeat when he ran against Republican incumbent Milton Young for the U.S. Senate.

== Congressional career ==
=== United States representative ===
In spring 1958, Usher Burdick, who worried about being defeated for re-election in the Republican primary, offered to withdraw his candidacy if the NPL agreed to support his son as the Democratic-NPL candidate for his seat in the U.S. House of Representatives. Quentin subsequently received the NPL endorsement in April, and was elected to North Dakota's at-large congressional district the following November. He was the first Democrat-NPLer to be elected to the House of Representatives from North Dakota.

During his tenure in the House, Burdick served as a member of the House Interior Committee, where he promoted the Garrison Diversion Project to provide water from the Missouri River to North Dakota. He received high ratings from organized labor and the Americans for Democratic Action. An opponent of the Eisenhower administration's farm policies, in his maiden speech on the House floor, Burdick called for the resignation of U.S. Secretary of Agriculture Ezra Taft Benson.

=== United States senator ===
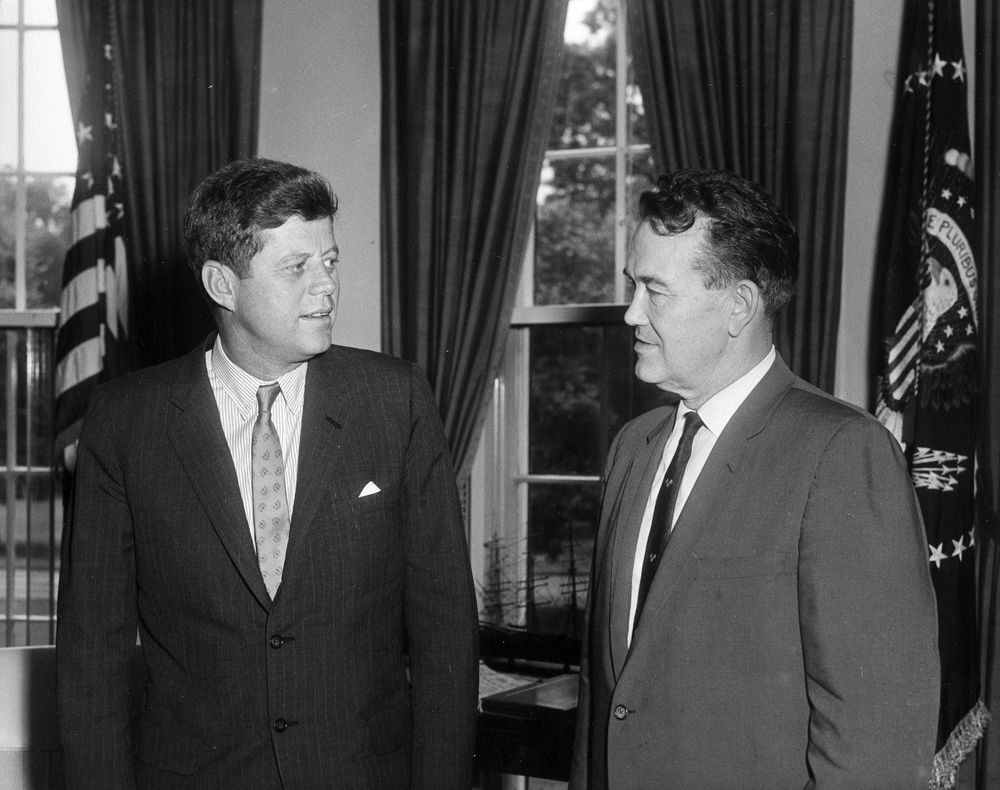
Burdick with President John F. Kennedy in 1961

After the death of Senator William Langer in November 1959, Burdick ran in a special election on June 28, 1960, to fill the remaining four and a half years of Langer's term. His Republican opponent was Governor John E. Davis. During the campaign, Burdick received strong support from the National Farmers Union. He called for high price supports and strict production controls on grains with high surpluses. His campaign slogan, "Beat Benson with Burdick", referred to Agriculture Secretary Benson, whose policies were unpopular with the state's wheat farmers. Burdick narrowly defeated Davis by a margin of 1,118 votes.

Nine days after the election, the widower married Jocelyn Birch Peterson. She had two children from a previous marriage. Together the couple had one son, Gage, who died on May 23, 1978, at the age of 16 after receiving a shock from an electric belt sander at the family home.

On August 8, 1960, Burdick resigned his House seat and was sworn in as a member of the U.S. Senate. He secured a full six-year term in the heavily Democratic year of 1964, having defeated Republican Thomas Kleppe.

Burdick easily defeated Kleppe in a rematch in 1970, another national Democratic year. He continued to be reelected by wide margins in 1976, 1982, and 1988.

In 1987, Burdick became the chairman of the Senate Environment and Public Works Committee.

In 1990, he was one of only nine senators, all Democratic, who voted against confirming David Souter as an associate justice of the Supreme Court of the United States.

Burdick earned the nickname the "King of Pork" for focusing nearly all of his legislative efforts on bringing federal funds to North Dakota, which was rural, poor, and less developed than many other states.

== Death ==
Near the end of his life, Burdick suffered from health problems, including hospitalizations for heart problems, including a mild heart attack. At the end of his tenure, 76% of North Dakotans believed he should step down from his seat. On September 8, 1992, at age 84, Burdick died from heart failure, while at St. Luke's Hospital in Fargo.

His widow, Jocelyn Burdick, was appointed by Governor George Sinner to fill his unexpired term until a special election was held that November. Ironically, Kent Conrad, who was elected to North Dakota's other Senate seat in 1986 but announced he would not run for reelection in 1992, reversed course and won the special election to fill Burdick's unexpired term. Byron Dorgan won the concurrent election for a six-year term to the seat Conrad vacated.

== See also ==
- List of members of the United States Congress who died in office (1950–1999)

Party political offices
Preceded by Oscar W. Hagen	Republican nominee for Lieutenant Governor of North Dakota; 1942	Succeeded by Clarence P. Dahl
Preceded by William T. DePuy	Democratic nominee for Governor of North Dakota; 1946	Succeeded by Howard I. Henry
Preceded by Harry O'Brien	Democratic nominee for U.S. Senator from North Dakota (Class 3); 1956	Succeeded by William Lanier
Preceded by Raymond Vendsel	Democratic nominee for U.S. Senator from North Dakota (Class 1); 1960, 1964, 1970, 1976, 1982, 1988	Succeeded by Kent Conrad
U.S. House of Representatives
Preceded by Usher L. Burdick	Member of the U.S. House of Representatives from North Dakota's at-large congressional district 1959–1960	Succeeded by Hjalmar Carl Nygaard
U.S. Senate
Preceded by C. Norman Brunsdale	U.S. senator (Class 1) from North Dakota; 1960–1992; Served alongside: Milton Young, Mark Andrews, Kent Conrad	Succeeded by Jocelyn Burdick
Political offices
Preceded by Robert Stafford	Chairman of Senate Environment and Public Works Committee; 1987–1992	Succeeded by Pat Moynihan
