= 1986 United States Senate election in North Dakota =

- November 4, 1986
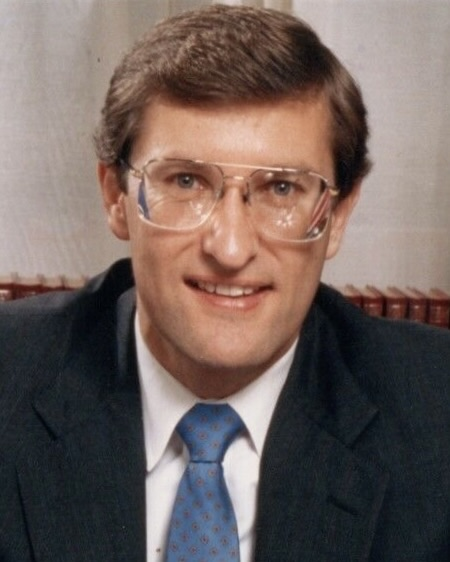

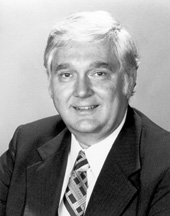
Nominee	Kent Conrad	Mark Andrews
Party	Democratic–NPL	Republican
Popular vote	143,932	141,812
Percentage	49.80%	49.07%
- County results Conrad: 40–50% 50–60% 60–70% Andrews: 40–50% 50–60%
U.S. senator before election
Mark Andrews
Republican
Elected U.S. Senator
Kent Conrad
Democratic–NPL

The 1986 United States Senate election in North Dakota was held on November 4, 1986. Incumbent Republican U.S. Senator Mark Andrews ran for re-election to a second term, but was defeated by Democratic-NPL nominee Kent Conrad.

== General election ==
=== Candidates ===
- Anna B. Bourgois (Independent)
- Kent Conrad, State Tax Commissioner (1981–1986) (Democratic-NPL)
- Mark Andrews, incumbent U.S. Senator (Republican)

=== Campaign ===
Andrews lost re-election by 2,120 votes after a rigorous campaign involving personal attacks and other strategies

=== Results ===
General election results
Party	Candidate	Votes	%
Democratic–NPL	Kent Conrad	143,932	49.80%
Republican	Mark Andrews (incumbent)	141,812	49.07%
Independent	Anna B. Bourgois	3,269	1.13%
Total votes		289,013	100.00%
Democratic–NPL gain from Republican			

== See also ==
- 1986 United States Senate elections

== Notes ==
- 1986 North Dakota U.S. Senate Election results
