= 1916 United States Senate election in North Dakota =

- November 7, 1916
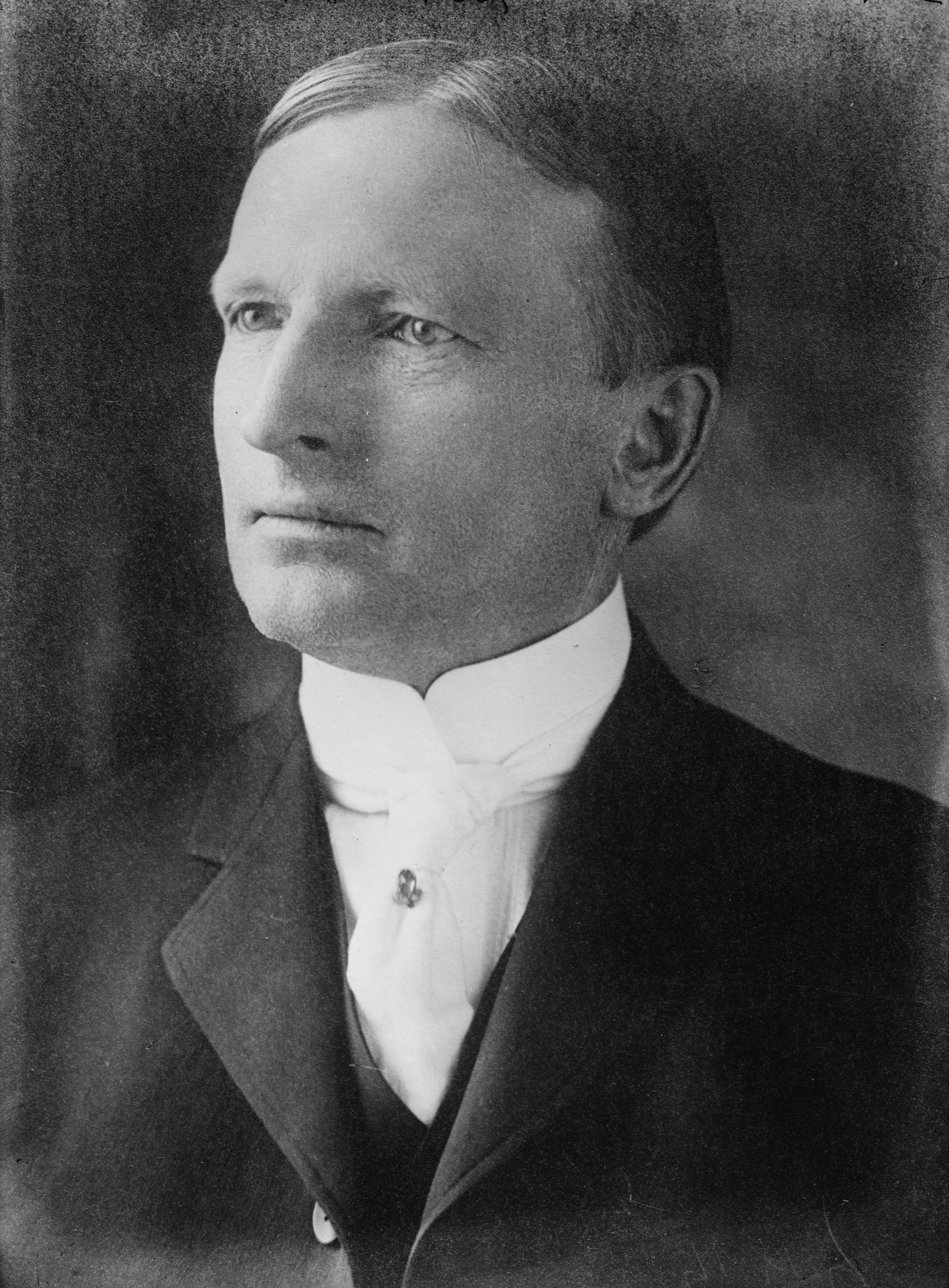

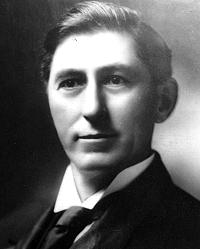

Nominee	Porter J. McCumber	John Burke	E. R. Fry
Party	Republican	Democratic	Socialist
Popular vote	57,714	40,988	8,472
Percentage	53.85%	38.24%	7.90%
- County results McCumber: 40–50% 50–60% 60–70% 70–80% 80–90% Burke: 40–50%
U.S. senator before election
Porter J. McCumber
Republican
Elected U.S. Senator
Porter J. McCumber
Republican

The 1916 United States Senate election in North Dakota took place on November 7, 1916. Incumbent Senator Porter J. McCumber, a Republican, sought re-election in his first popular election. He won the Republican primary with a plurality and faced former Governor John Burke, the Democratic nominee, and E. R. Fry, the Socialist nominee, in the general election. Though incumbent Democratic President Woodrow Wilson narrowly won the state in the presidential election, McCumber defeated Burke and Fry in a landslide.

== Democratic primary ==
=== Candidates ===
- John Burke, former Governor of North Dakota
- Frank O. Hellstrom, former Warden of the North Dakota State Penitentiary, 1912 and 1914 Democratic nominee for Governor

=== Results ===
Democratic primary results
Party	Candidate	Votes	%
Democratic	John Burke	9,627	71.65%
Democratic	Frank O. Hellstrom	3,809	28.35%
Total votes		13,437	100.00%

== Republican primary ==
=== Candidates ===
- Porter J. McCumber, incumbent U.S. Senator
- Ragnvald Nestos, Ward County State's Attorney
- L. B. Hanna, incumbent Governor of North Dakota
- Herman N. Midtbo, perennial candidate

=== Results ===
Republican primary results
Party	Candidate	Votes	%
Republican	Porter J. McCumber (inc.)	29,680	43.09%
Republican	Ragnvald Nestos	6,844	19.86%
Republican	Harry P. Ilsley	6,683	19.39%
Republican	M. A. Underwood	1,093	3.17%
Total votes		34,462	100.00%

== Socialist primary ==
=== Candidates ===
- E. R. Fry

=== Results ===
Socialist primary results
Party	Candidate	Votes	%
Socialist	E. R. Fry	1,847	100.00%
Total votes		1,847	100.00%

== General election ==
=== Results ===
1916 United States Senate election in North Dakota
Party	Candidate	Votes	%
Republican	Porter J. McCumber (inc.)	57,714	53.85%
Democratic	John Burke	40,988	38.24%
Socialist	E. R. Fry	8,472	7.90%
Majority		16,726	15.61%
Total votes		107,174	100.00%
Republican hold			
