= 1938 United States Senate election in North Dakota =

- November 8, 1938
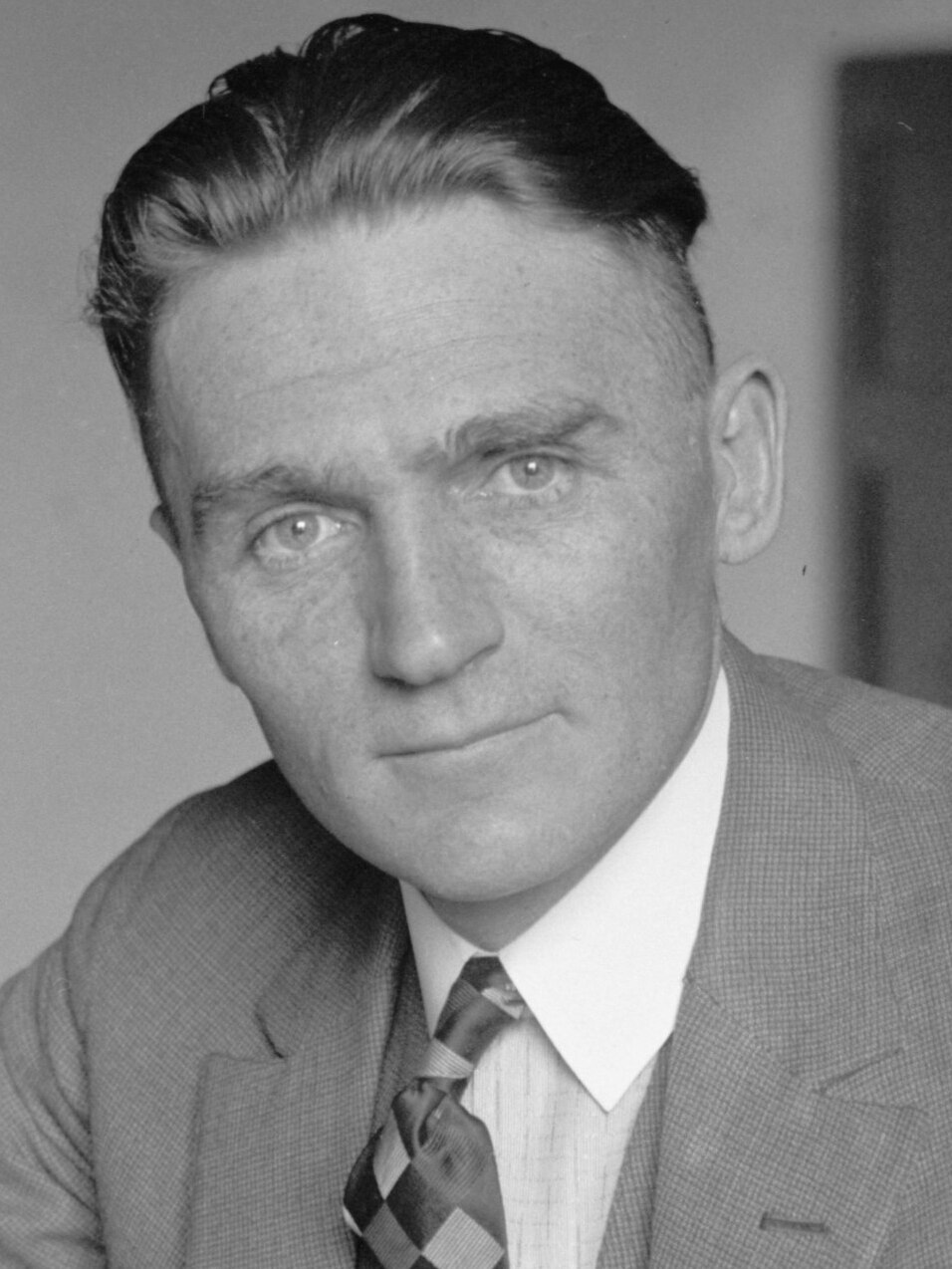

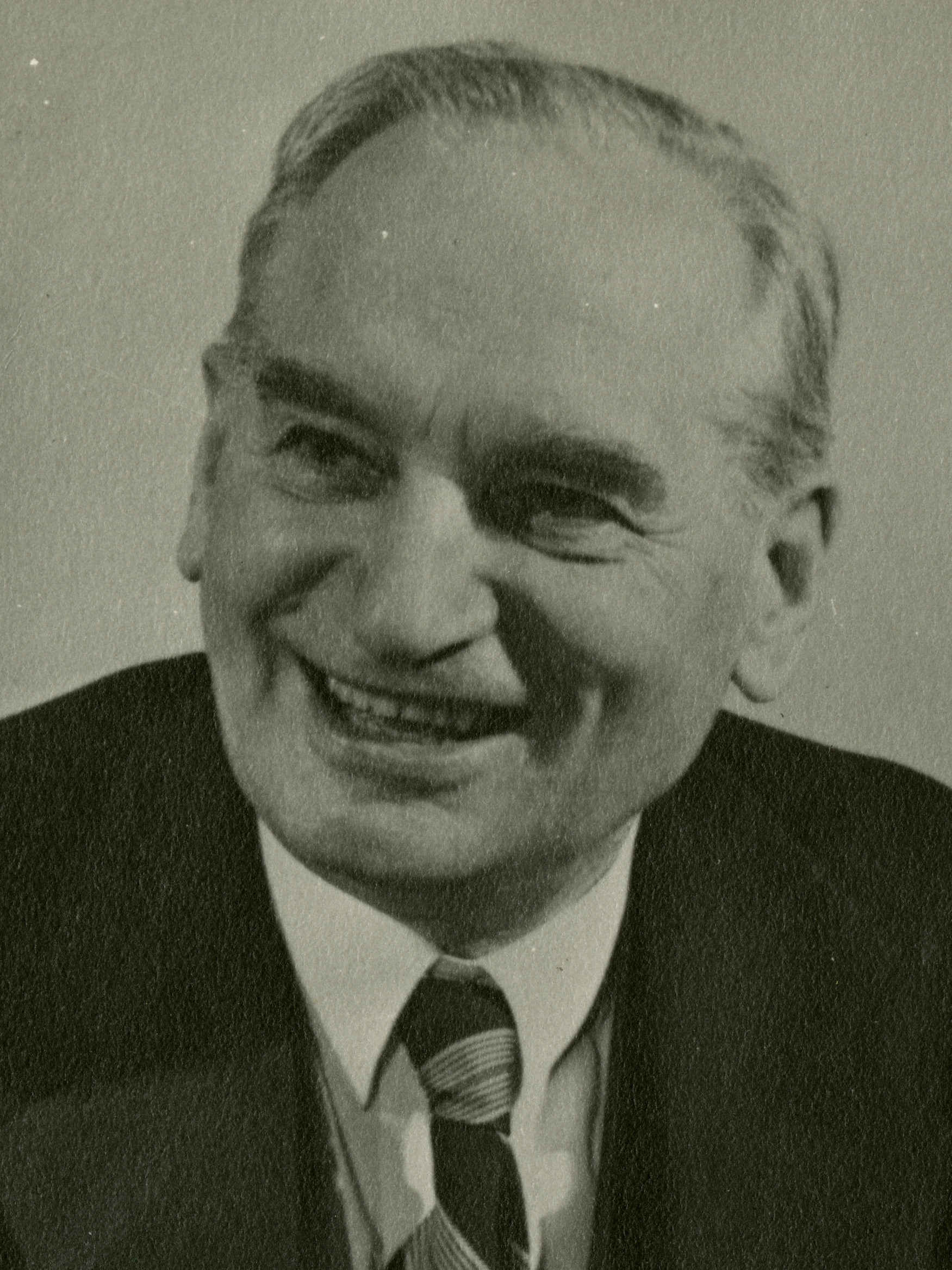

Nominee	Gerald Nye	William Langer	J. J. Nygaard
Party	Republican	Independent	Democratic
Popular vote	131,907	112,007	19,244
Percentage	50.12%	42.56%	7.31%
- County results Nye: 40–50% 50–60% 60–70% Langer: 40–50% 50–60% 60–70%
U.S. senator before election
Gerald Nye
Republican
Elected U.S. Senator
Gerald Nye
Republican

The 1938 United States Senate election in North Dakota took place on November 8, 1938. Incumbent Republican Senator Gerald Nye ran for re-election to his third term. He faced a strong challenge in the Republican primary from colorful Governor William Langer, but narrowly won renomination. Langer subsequently ran as an independent against Nye in the general election, and won the endorsement of the Nonpartisan League. The contest effectively sidelined Democratic nominee J. J. Nygaard, and the contest between Nye and Langer devolved into sharp disagreements about the United States's foreign affairs. Nye ultimately defeated Langer by a wide margin—winning 50% of the vote to Langer's 43%—but significantly reduced from his 1932 and 1926 landslides.

== Democratic primary ==
=== Candidates ===
- J. J. Nygaard, 1936 Democratic congressional candidate
- Halvor L. Halvorson, perennial candidate
- B. A. Johansson

=== Results ===
Democratic primary
Party	Candidate	Votes	%
Democratic	J. J. Nygaard	27,981	72.00%
Democratic	Halvor L. Halvorson	8,335	21.45%
Democratic	B. A. Johansson	2,545	6.55%
Total votes		38,861	100.00%

== Republican primary ==
=== Candidates ===
- Gerald Nye, incumbent U.S. Senator
- William Langer, Governor of North Dakota

=== Results ===
Republican primary
Party	Candidate	Votes	%
Republican	Gerald Nye (inc.)	91,510	51.45%
Republican	William Langer	86,359	48.55%
Total votes		177,869	100.00%

== General election ==
=== Results ===
1938 United States Senate election in North Dakota
Party	Candidate	Votes	%	±%
Republican	Gerald Nye (inc.)	131,907	50.12%	−22.18%
Independent	William Langer	112,007	42.56%	—
Democratic	J. J. Nygaard	19,244	7.31%	−20.14%
Majority		19,900	7.56%	−37.29%
Turnout		263,158		
Republican hold				
