= 1926 United States Senate election in North Dakota =

- November 2, 1926
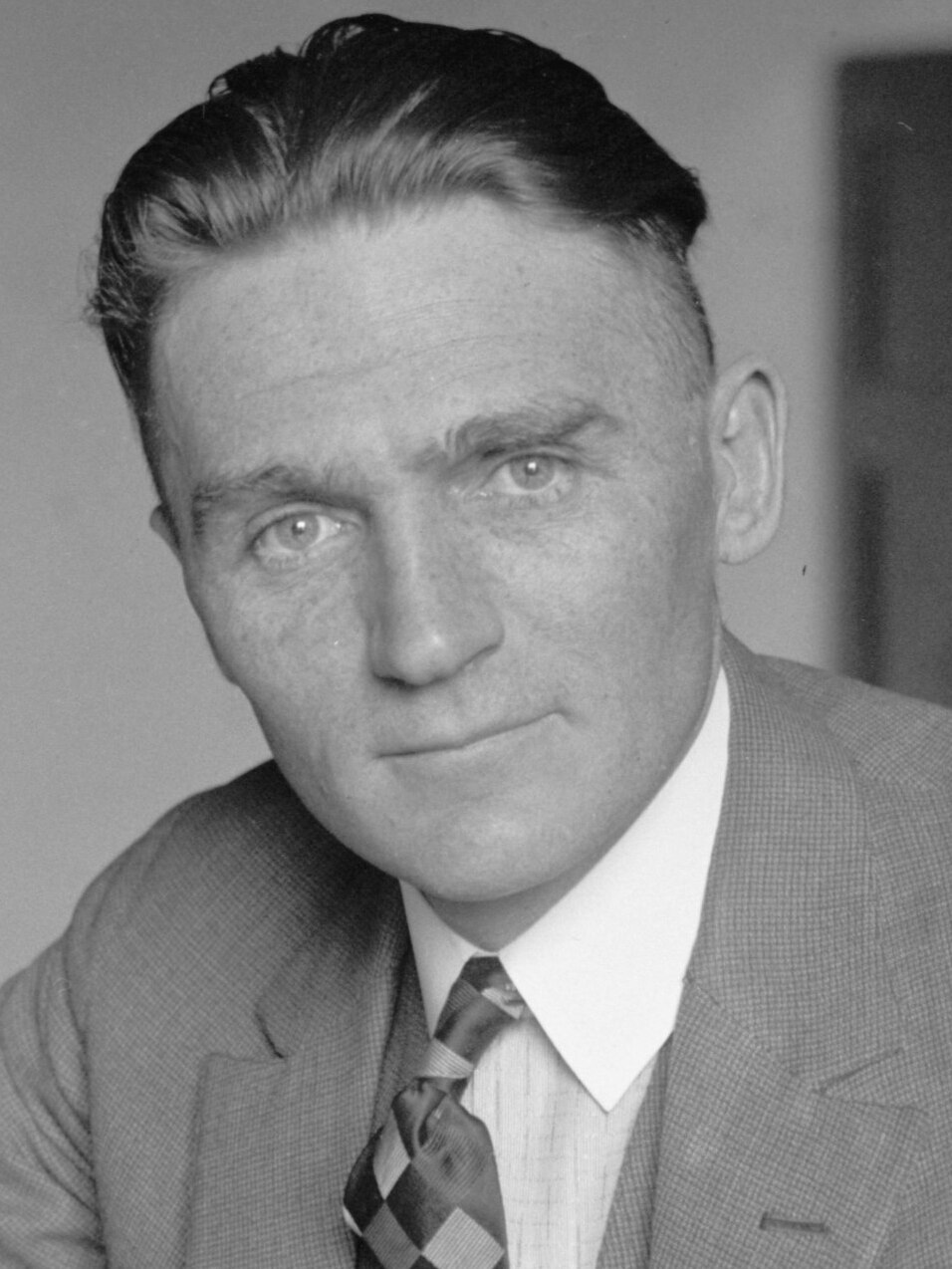

Nominee	Gerald Nye	Norris H. Nelson
Party	Republican	Independent Republican
Popular vote	107,921	18,951
Percentage	69.58%	12.22%
Nominee	F. F. Burchard	C. P. Stone
Party	Democratic	Independent Republican
Popular vote	13,519	9,738
Percentage	8.72%	6.28%
- County results Nye: 50–60% 60–70% 70–80% 80–90%
U.S. senator before election
Gerald Nye
Republican
Elected U.S. Senator
Gerald Nye
Republican

The 1926 United States Senate election in North Dakota took place on November 2, 1926. Following his re-election in the special election earlier in the year, Senator Gerald Nye ran for re-election to a full term. Despite spurning the Republican Party's endorsement in the special election, Nye ran in the Republican primary in the regular election. On the same day that he defeated former Governor Louis B. Hanna in the special election—in which Hanna had the Republican nomination and Nye ran as the Nonpartisan League candidate—Nye defeated Hanna in the Republican primary for the regular election. Nye once again faced a crowded general election, but emerged victorious in a landslide, winning nearly 70% of the vote while none of his opponents exceeded 15%.

== Democratic primary ==
=== Candidates ===
- F. F. Burchard, high school teacher
- Halvor Halvorson (write-in)

=== Campaign ===
At the Democratic convention in Grand Forks, teacher F. F. Burchard was nominated by the state party as their candidate for the U.S. Senate. However, Halvor Halvorson challenged the decision of the state party to select its nominee at the convention and instead filed paperwork to be listed on the primary election ballot, arguing that there was a vacancy on the ballot that he was entitled to fill. The issue was taken to the state Supreme Court, which ruled against Halvorson, though it left open the question of whether Halvorson was allowed to file. Ultimately, however, the Secretary of State's office rejected Halvorson's petition, forcing him to run as a write-in candidate.

=== Results ===
Democratic primary
Party	Candidate	Votes	%
Democratic	F. F. Burchard	6,126	97.81%
Democratic	Halvor Halvorson (write-in)	137	2.19%
Total votes		6,263	100.00%

== Republican primary ==
=== Candidates ===
- Gerald Nye, incumbent U.S. Senator
- Louis B. Hanna, former Governor of North Dakota
- C. P. Stone, businessman
- Herman N. Midtbo, perennial candidate

=== Results ===
Republican primary
Party	Candidate	Votes	%
Republican	Gerald Nye (inc.)	81,475	50.31%
Republican	Louis B. Hanna	65,973	40.73%
Republican	C. P. Stone	12,937	7.99%
Republican	Herman N. Midtbo	1,573	0.97%
Total votes		161,958	100.00%

== Farmer–Labor Party primary ==
=== Candidates ===
- William Lemke, former Attorney General
- Gerald Nye, incumbent U.S. Senator
- C. E. Erickson

=== Results ===
Farmer–Labor primary
Party	Candidate	Votes	%
Farmer–Labor	William Lemke	295	93.06%
Farmer–Labor	Gerald Nye (inc.)	21	6.62%
Farmer–Labor	C. E. Erickson	1	0.32%
Total votes		317	100.00%

== General election ==
=== Results ===
1926 United States Senate election in North Dakota
Party	Candidate	Votes	%	±%
Republican	Gerald Nye (inc.)	107,921	69.58%	+32.11%
Independent Republican	Norris H. Nelson	18,951	12.22%	—
Democratic	F. F. Burchard	13,519	8.72%	—
Independent Republican	C. P. Stone	9,738	6.28%	—
Farmer–Labor	William Lemke	4,977	3.21%	—
Majority		88,970	57.36%	+44.64%
Turnout		155,106		
Republican hold				
