= 1926 United States Senate special election in North Dakota =

- June 30, 1926
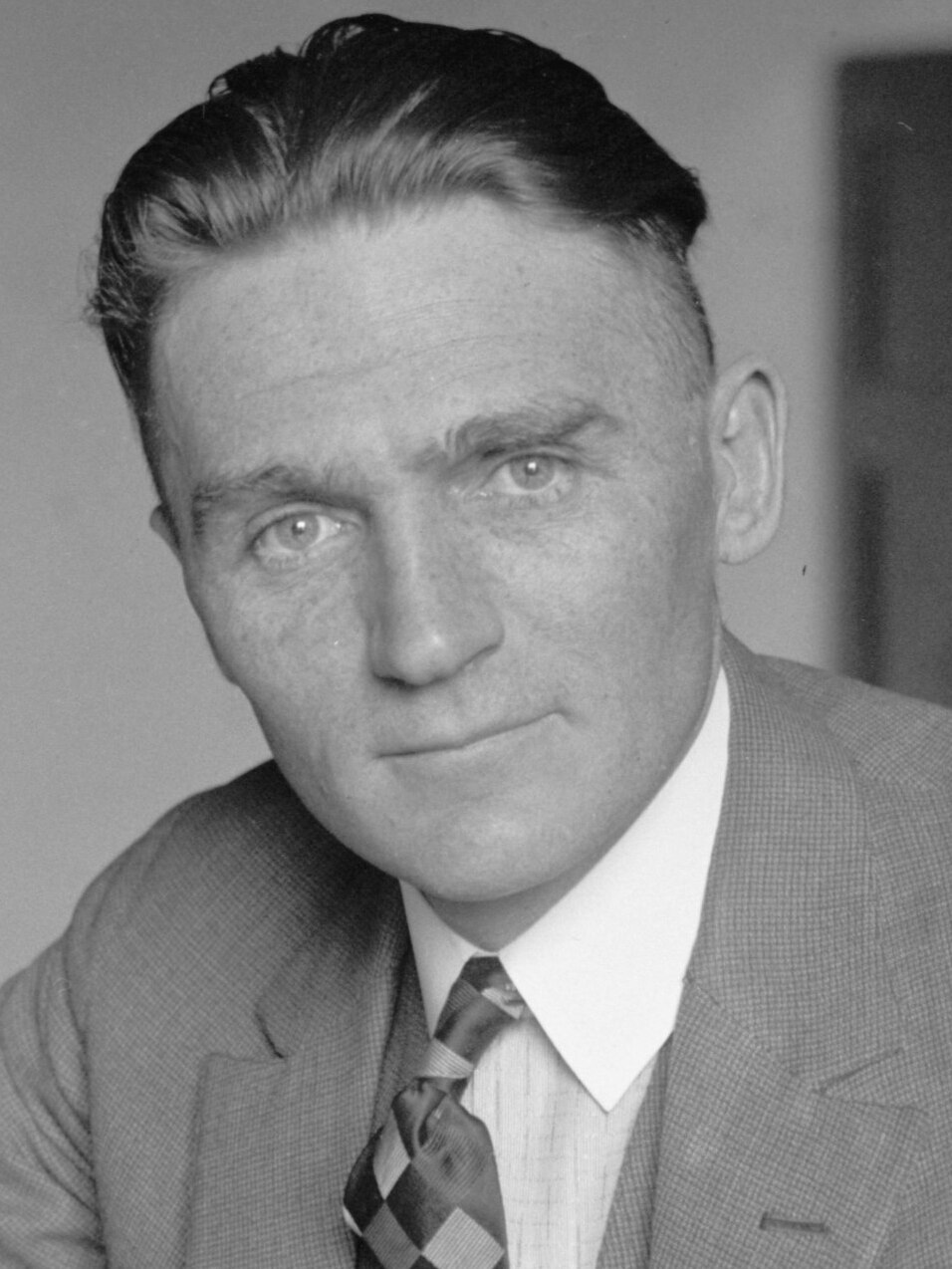

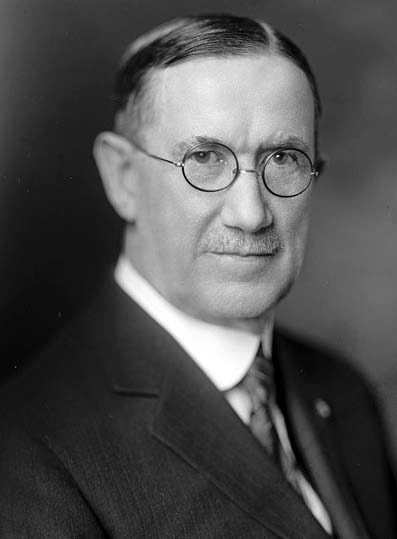

Nominee	Gerald Nye	L. B. Hanna	C. P. Stone
Party	Nonpartisan League	Republican	Independent Republican
Alliance		Democratic
Popular vote	79,709	59,499	19,586
Percentage	50.19%	37.46%	12.33%
- County results Nye: 40–50% 50–60% 60–70% 70–80% Hanna: 40–50% 50–60%
U.S. senator before election
Gerald Nye
Republican
Elected U.S. Senator
Gerald Nye
Republican

The 1926 United States Senate special election in North Dakota took place on June 30, 1926. On June 22, 1925, Republican Senator Edwin F. Ladd died in office. Governor Arthur G. Sorlie appointed Gerald Nye, a former congressional candidate and a prominent progressive activist, to fill Ladd's vacancy. A special election and regularly scheduled election were scheduled for the same year, though the special election, to fill the remaining months of Ladd's term, took place months before the regularly scheduled election.

Nye won the endorsement of the Nonpartisan League and rejected any efforts by the state Republican Party to nominate him. Meanwhile, the Democratic Party opted not to run a candidate, instead fusing with the Republicans to support the anti-Nonpartisan League campaign of former Governor Louis B. Hanna. Separately, C. P. Stone, a businessman, ran as an Independent Republican candidate. All of the nominations were conducted under conventions, not primaries, because the election was a special election. Ultimately, Nye won a full term over his opponents by a healthy margin, winning 50% of the vote to Hanna's 37% and Stone's 12%.

== General election ==
=== Results ===
1926 United States Senate special election in North Dakota
Party	Candidate	Votes	%	±%
Nonpartisan League	Gerald Nye (inc.)	79,709	50.19%	—
Republican	Louis B. Hanna	59,499	37.46%	−22.15%
Independent Republican	C. P. Stone	19,586	12.33%	—
Write-ins		20	0.01%	—
Majority		20,210	12.73%	−6.50%
Turnout		158,814		
Nonpartisan League hold				
