= 1920 United States Senate election in North Dakota =

- November 2, 1920
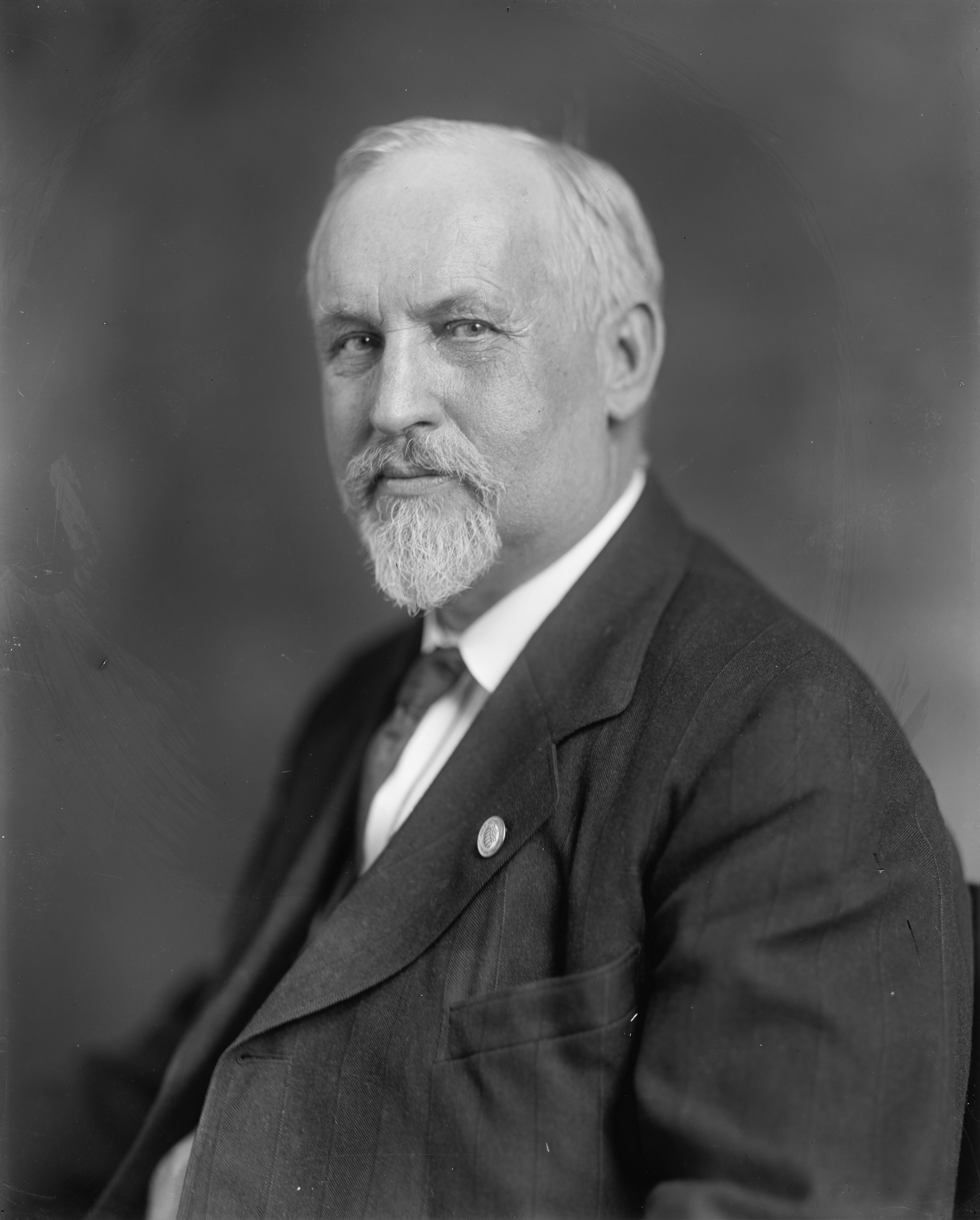

Nominee	Edwin F. Ladd	H. H. Perry
Party	Republican	Democratic
Popular vote	130,614	88,495
Percentage	59.61%	40.39%
- County results Ladd: 50–60% 60–70% 70–80% 80–90% Perry: 50–60%
U.S. senator before election
Asle Gronna
Republican
Elected U.S. Senator
Edwin F. Ladd
Republican

The 1920 United States Senate election in North Dakota took place on November 2, 1920. Incumbent Republican Senator Asle Gronna ran for re-election to a third term. However, he was narrowly defeated in the Republican primary by Edwin F. Ladd, the President of the North Dakota Agricultural College, who had been endorsed by the Nonpartisan League. In the general election, Ladd was opposed by H. H. Perry, the Democratic nominee and a Democratic National Committeeman. As Republican presidential nominee Warren G. Harding overwhelmingly won North Dakota over Democratic nominee James M. Cox, Ladd also staked out a wide victory—though his margin of victory was not as large as Harding's.

== Democratic primary ==
=== Candidates ===
- H. H. Perry, Democratic National Committeeman

=== Results ===
Democratic primary
Party	Candidate	Votes	%
Democratic	H. H. Perry	8,238	100.00%
Total votes		8,238	100.00%

== Republican primary ==
=== Candidates ===
- Edwin F. Ladd, President of the North Dakota Agricultural College, former State Chemist and Food Commissioner
- Asle Gronna, incumbent U.S. Senator
- Frank White

=== Results ===
Republican primary
Party	Candidate	Votes	%
Republican	Edwin F. Ladd	54,957	49.26%
Republican	Asle Gronna (inc.)	51,142	45.84%
Republican	Frank White	5,477	4.91%
Total votes		111,576	100.00%

== General election ==
=== Results ===
1920 United States Senate election in North Dakota
Party	Candidate	Votes	%	±%
Republican	Edwin F. Ladd	130,614	59.61%	+3.80%
Democratic	H. H. Perry	88,495	40.39%	+6.44%
Majority		42,119	19.22%	−2.64%
Turnout		219,109		
Republican hold				
