= 1914 North Dakota gubernatorial election =

- November 3, 1914
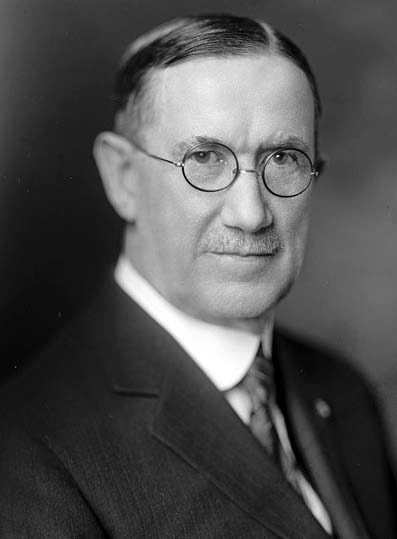

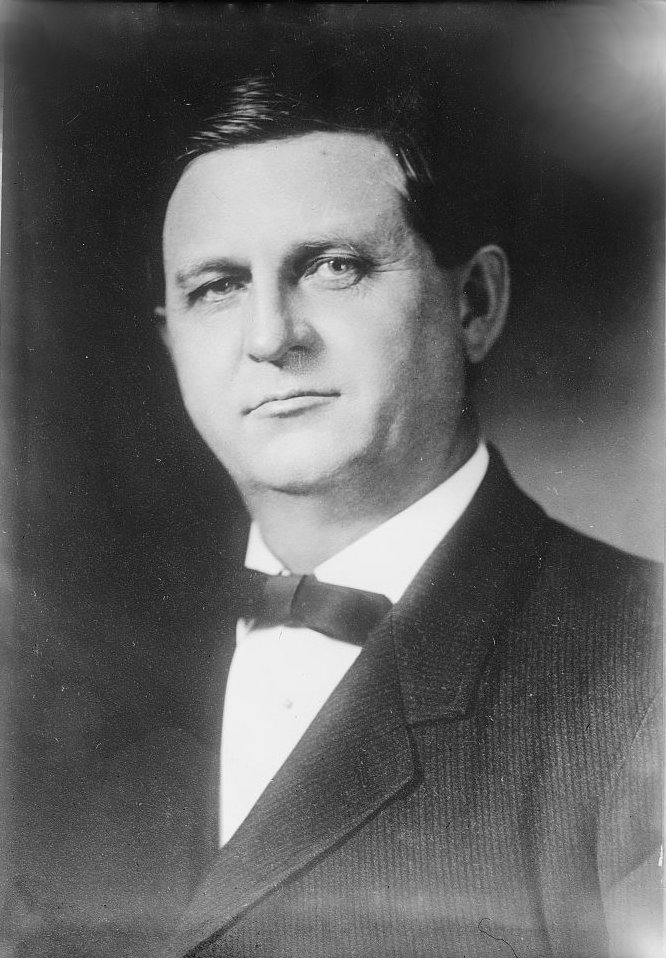

| Nominee | L. B. Hanna | Frank O. Hellstrom | J. A. Williams |
| Party | Republican | Democratic | Socialist |
| Popular vote | 44,279 | 34,746 | 6,019 |
| Percentage | 49.58% | 38.91% | 6.74% |
- County results Hanna: 30–40% 40–50% 50–60% 60–70% Hellstrom: 30–40% 40–50% 50–60%
Governor before election
L. B. Hanna
Republican
Elected Governor
L. B. Hanna
Republican

The 1914 North Dakota gubernatorial election was held on November 3, 1914. Incumbent Republican L. B. Hanna defeated Democratic nominee Frank O. Hellstrom with 49.58% of the vote.

== Primary elections ==
Primary elections were held on June 24, 1914.

=== Republican primary ===
==== Candidates ====
- L. B. Hanna, incumbent Governor
- Usher L. Burdick, former Lieutenant Governor
- J. H. Wishek

==== Results ====
Republican primary results
| Party | Candidate | Votes | % |
|---|---|---|---|
| Republican | L. B. Hanna (inc.) | 26,261 | 42.91 |
| Republican | Usher L. Burdick | 22,195 | 36.27 |
| Republican | J. H. Wishek | 12,745 | 20.83 |
| Total votes | | 61,201 | 100.00 |

== General election ==
=== Candidates ===
Major party candidates

- L. B. Hanna, Republican
- Frank O. Hellstrom, Democratic

Other candidates

- J. A. Williams, Socialist
- Hans H. Aaker, Prohibition

=== Results ===
1914 North Dakota gubernatorial election
| Party | Candidate | Votes | % | ±% |
|---|---|---|---|---|
| Republican | L. B. Hanna (inc.) | 44,279 | 49.58 | ▲4.13 |
| Democratic | Frank O. Hellstrom | 34,746 | 38.91 | ▲2.90 |
| Socialist | J. A. Williams | 6,019 | 6.74 | ▼1.06 |
| Prohibition | Hans H. Aaker | 4,263 | 4.77 | N/A |
| Majority | | 9,533 | 10.67 | ▲1.23 |
| Total votes | | 89,307 | 100.00 | |
| Republican hold | | | | |
