= 1912 North Dakota gubernatorial election =

- November 5, 1912
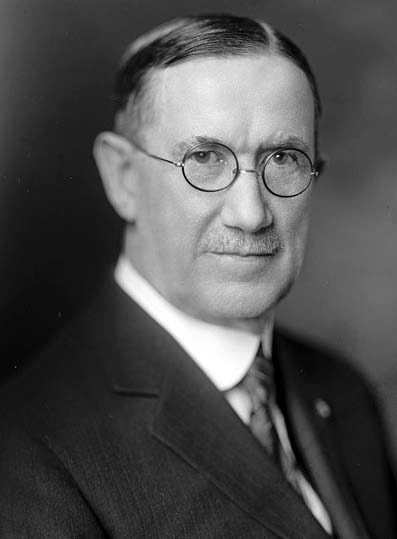

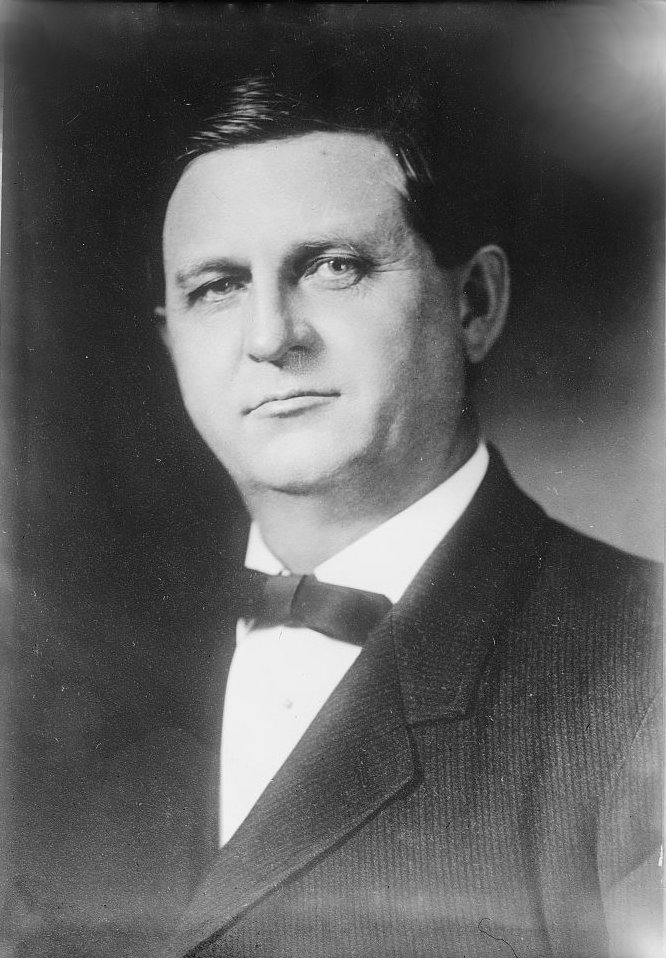

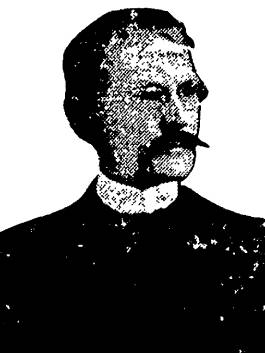

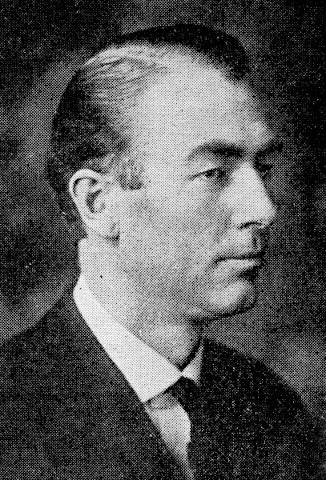
Nominee	L. B. Hanna	Frank O. Hellstrom
Party	Republican	Democratic
Popular vote	39,811	31,544
Percentage	45.45%	36.01%
Nominee	W. D. Sweet	A. E. Bowen Jr.
Party	Progressive	Socialist
Popular vote	9,406	6,835
Percentage	10.74%	7.80%
- County results Hanna: 30–40% 40–50% 50–60% 60–70% Hellstrom: 30–40% 40–50% 50–60%
Governor before election
John Burke
Democratic
Elected Governor
L. B. Hanna
Republican

The 1912 North Dakota gubernatorial election was held on November 5, 1912. Republican nominee L. B. Hanna defeated Democratic nominee Frank O. Hellstrom with 45.45% of the vote.

== Primary elections ==
Primary elections were held on June 26, 1912.

=== Democratic primary ===
==== Candidates ====
- Frank O. Hellstrom, Warden of the North Dakota State Penitentiary
- George P. Jones

==== Results ====
Democratic primary results by county
- Hellstrom—70–80%
- 60–70%
- 50–60%
- Tie
- 50–60%
- 60–70%
- 70–80%
- Jones—80–90%

Democratic primary results
Party	Candidate	Votes	%
Democratic	Frank O. Hellstrom	5,159	51.28%
Democratic	George P. Jones	4,901	48.72%
Total votes		10,060	100.00%

=== Republican primary ===
==== Candidates ====
- L. B. Hanna, U.S. Representative
- James A. Buchanan
- C. A. Johnson
- H. N. Midtbo

==== Results ====
Republican primary results
Party	Candidate	Votes	%
Republican	L. B. Hanna	24,515	42.63%
Republican	James A. Buchanan	22,902	39.83%
Republican	C. A. Johnson	8,770	15.25%
Republican	H. N. Midtbo	1,316	2.29%
Total votes		57,503	100.00%

== General election ==
=== Candidates ===
Major party candidates

- L. B. Hanna, Republican
- Frank O. Hellstrom, Democratic

Other candidates

- W. D. Sweet, Progressive
- A. E. Bowen Jr., Socialist

=== Results ===
1912 North Dakota gubernatorial election
Party	Candidate	Votes	%	±%
Republican	L. B. Hanna	39,811	45.45	▼1.91
Democratic	Frank O. Hellstrom	31,544	36.01	▼13.95
Progressive	W. D. Sweet	9,406	10.74	N/A
Socialist	A. E. Bowen Jr.	6,835	7.80	▲5.12
Majority		8,267	9.44	▲6.84
Total votes		87,596	100.00	
Republican gain from Democratic				
