= 1932 United States Senate election in North Dakota =

- November 8, 1932

Nominee	Gerald Nye	P. W. Lanier
Party	Republican	Democratic
Popular vote	172,796	65,612
Percentage	72.30%	27.45%
- County results Nye: 50–60% 60–70% 70–80% 80–90%
U.S. senator before election
Gerald Nye
Republican
Elected U.S. Senator
Gerald Nye
Republican

The 1932 United States Senate election in North Dakota took place on November 8, 1932. Incumbent Republican Senator Gerald Nye ran for re-election to his second term. He was challenged in the Republican primary by Governor George F. Shafer, but easily won renomination. In the general election, he faced P. W. Lanier, a 1930 Democratic congressional candidate. Even as Democrats were performing well nationwide, Nye had little difficulty winning re-election in a landslide.

== Democratic primary ==
=== Candidates ===
- P. W. Lanier, 1930 Democratic congressional candidate
- Halvor L. Halvorson

=== Results ===
Democratic primary
Party	Candidate	Votes	%
Democratic	P. W. Lanier	16,354	62.47%
Democratic	Halvor L. Halvorson	9,825	37.53%
Total votes		26,179	100.00%

== Republican primary ==
=== Candidates ===
- Gerald Nye, incumbent U.S. Senator
- George F. Shafer, Governor of North Dakota

=== Results ===
Republican primary
Party	Candidate	Votes	%
Republican	Gerald Nye (inc.)	134,009	67.94%
Republican	George F. Shafer	63,232	32.06%
Total votes		197,241	100.00%

== General election ==
=== Results ===
1932 United States Senate election in North Dakota
Party	Candidate	Votes	%	±%
Republican	Gerald Nye (inc.)	172,796	72.30%	+2.72%
Democratic	P. W. Lanier	65,612	27.45%	+18.74%
Independent	Frank Witty	589	0.25%	—
Majority		107,184	44.85%	−12.51%
Turnout		238,997		
Republican hold				
