= Edwin F. Ladd =

American politician (1859–1925)

Edwin Fremont Ladd
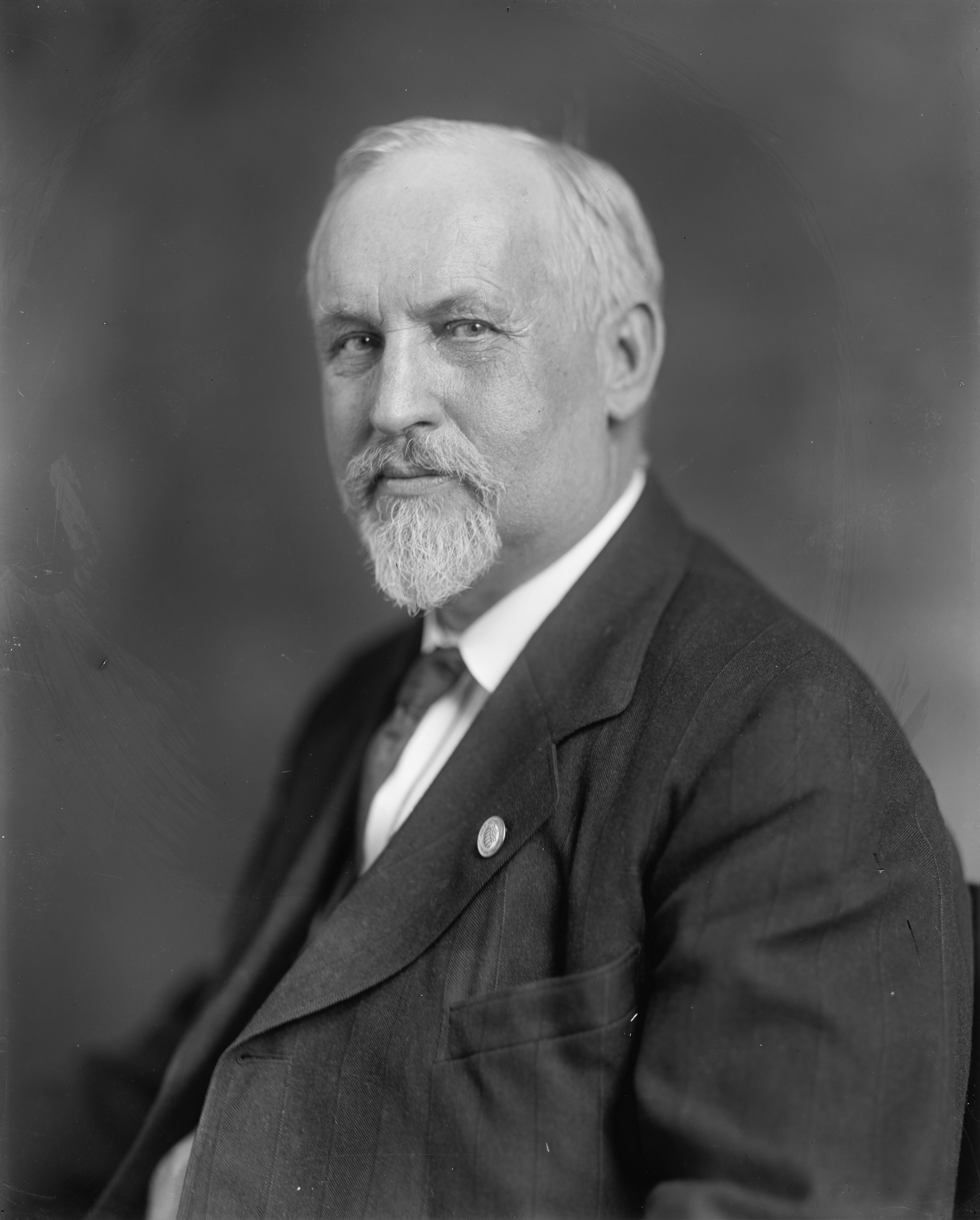
- Portrait by Harris & Ewing c. 1921–1925

United States Senator from North Dakota
- In office March 4, 1921 – June 22, 1925
- Preceded by: Asle Gronna
- Succeeded by: Gerald Nye

Personal details
- Born: December 13, 1859 Starks, Maine
- Died: June 22, 1925 (aged 65) Baltimore, Maryland
- Party: Republican (NPL faction)

Edwin Fremont Ladd (December 13, 1859 – June 22, 1925) was an American chemist, academic administrator, and politician. While serving in the United States Senate, he was chairman of the Committee on Public Roads and Surveys during the 68th Congress.

== Biography ==
He was born in Starks, Maine on December 13, 1859. He attended the public schools and Somerset Academy (Athens, Maine) and graduated with a B.S. from Maine Agricultural College (now the University of Maine) at Orono in 1884. He was a chemist of the New York State Experiment Station in Geneva, New York from 1884 to 1890 and dean of the school of chemistry and pharmacy and professor of chemistry at the North Dakota Agricultural College, Fargo, North Dakota. He was chief chemist of the North Dakota Agricultural Experiment Station from 1890 to 1916 and editor of the North Dakota Farmer at Lisbon from 1899 to 1904. He was administrator of the State's pure-food laws, for which he actively crusaded from 1902 to 1921; he was also president of the North Dakota Agricultural College from 1916 to 1921.

Ladd was elected as a Republican to the U.S. Senate in 1920 and served from March 4, 1921. He died at Johns Hopkins Hospital in Baltimore, Maryland on June 22, 1925. Interment was in Glenwood Cemetery, Washington, D.C.

== See also ==
- List of members of the United States Congress who died in office (1900–1949)
- 1920 United States Senate election in North Dakota

== Bibliography ==
- Bailey, N. Louise; Morgan, Mary L.; Taylor, Carolyn R. (1986). Biographical Directory of the South Carolina Senate: 1776-1985. Volume 1. Columbia, S.C.: University of South Carolina Press. ISBN 0872494799.
- United States Congress. "Edwin F. Ladd (id: L000012)". Biographical Directory of the United States Congress.

Party political offices
Preceded by Asle Gronna	Republican nominee for U.S. Senator from North Dakota (Class 3); 1920	Succeeded by L. B. Hanna
U.S. Senate
Preceded by Asle Gronna	U.S. senator (Class 3) from North Dakota; 1921 – 1925; Served alongside: Porter J. McCumber, Lynn Frazier	Succeeded by Gerald Nye
