= Frank O. Hellstrom =

American prison warden

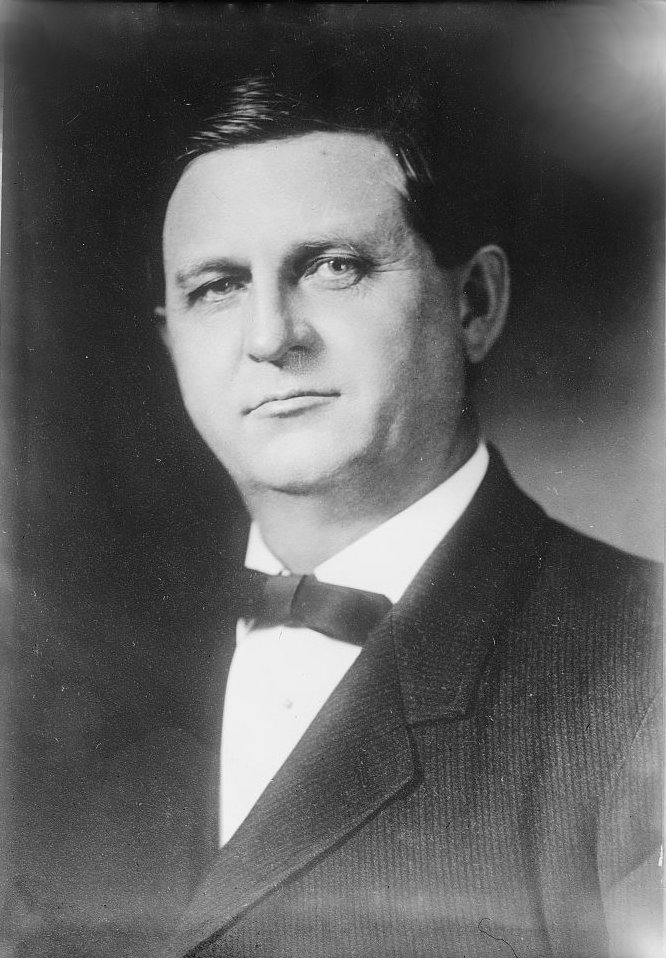
- Hellstrom circa. 1914
- Born: June 24, 1866 near Lone Star, Kansas
- Died: 1931; Fargo, North Dakota
- Occupation: Prison Warden
- Political party: Democratic
- Spouse: Sarah Elizabeth Markley (m. 1971)

Frank O. Hellstrom (June 24, 1866 – 1931) was the Democratic contender for Governor of North Dakota in 1912 and 1914 but was defeated by the Republican candidate, L. B. Hanna, both times. He was warden of the North Dakota State Penitentiary at Bismarck, North Dakota.

== Biography ==
He was born near Lone Star in Douglas County, Kansas to parents of Swedish descent. He married Sarah Elizabeth Markley (1871–1979). He was appointed as postmaster of Grove in Burleigh County, North Dakota on May 7, 1908.

He was warden of the North Dakota State Penitentiary at Bismarck, North Dakota in 1913 when he was the Democratic contender for Governor of North Dakota, but was defeated by the Republican candidate, Louis Benjamin Hanna.

He died in 1931 in Fargo, North Dakota. He was buried in Riverside Cemetery in Fargo, North Dakota.

Party political offices
Preceded by John Burke	Democratic nominee for Governor of North Dakota; 1912, 1914	Succeeded by D. H. McArthur
