= L. B. Hanna =

American politician (1861–1948)

Louis Benjamin Hanna
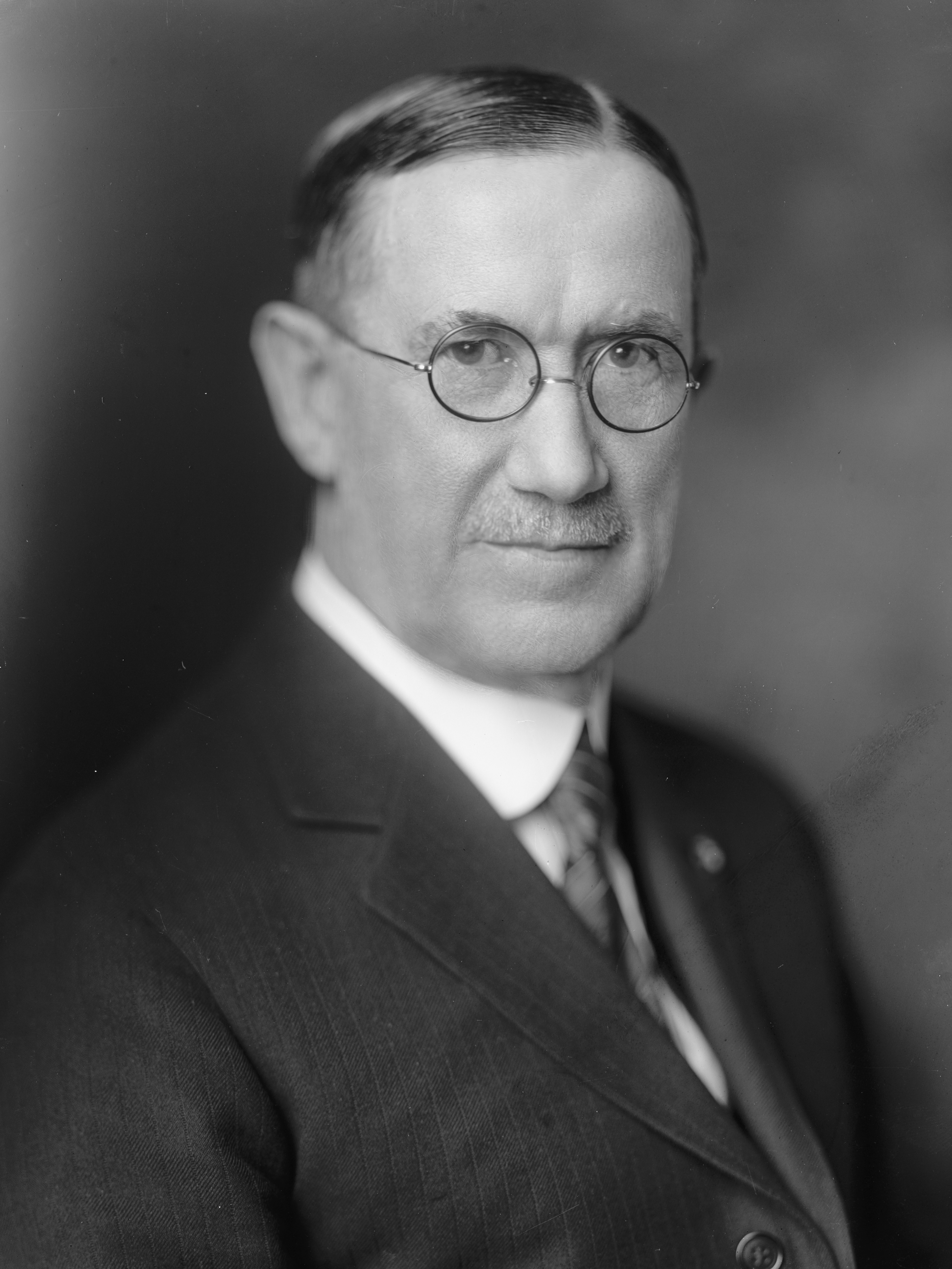

11th Governor of North Dakota
- In office January 8, 1913 – January 3, 1917
- Lieutenant: Anton Kraabel; John H. Fraine
- Preceded by: John Burke
- Succeeded by: Lynn Frazier

Member of the U.S. House of Representatives from North Dakota's at-large district
- In office March 4, 1909 – January 7, 1913 Serving with Asle Gronna (1909–1911) and Henry Thomas Helgesen (1911–1913)
- Preceded by: Thomas Frank Marshall
- Succeeded by: Seat disestablished

Member of the North Dakota Senate
- In office 1897–1901; 1905–1909

Member of the North Dakota House of Representatives
- In office 1895–1897

Personal details
- Born: August 9, 1861 New Brighton, Pennsylvania
- Died: April 23, 1948 (aged 86) Fargo, North Dakota
- Party: Republican
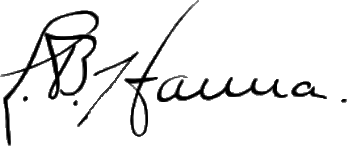
- Signature

Louis Benjamin Hanna (August 9, 1861 – April 23, 1948) was an American businessman, banker, and North Dakota Republican Party politician, who served in the North Dakota House of Representatives and as the 11th governor of North Dakota.

== Biography ==
Louis Benjamin Hanna was born in New Brighton, Pennsylvania. His parents, Jason R. and Margaret Hanna died when he was a small boy, leaving him to be raised by his aunts. Louis Hanna grew up and received his education in Massachusetts and New York. He came to the Dakota Territory in 1881 with his brother, Robert C. Hanna and began farming near what is now Hope, North Dakota. He was married on November 18, 1888, to Lottie L. Thatcher (1864–1933) and they had four children.

== Career ==
He sold his land in 1882 and moved to Page, where he began his career as a businessman. He started a retail lumber company, then expanded into grain handling. Soon he needed banking facilities, so he opened a private bank at Page. The bank became a state bank, then became the First National Bank of Page, with Hanna as the president.

From 1895 to 1897, Hanna served in the North Dakota House of Representatives. Hanna moved to Fargo in 1899, serving as vice president of the First National Bank of Fargo. Hanna took on the North Dakota Senate from 1897 to 1901, and again from 1905 to 1909, representing the Fargo district this time.

In 1908, Louis Hanna was elected to represent North Dakota in the United States House of Representatives where he served two terms, from 1909 to 1913. Without any lapse between positions, he became the eleventh Governor of North Dakota in 1913 beating Frank O. Hellstrom in the race. The four years in Bismarck as Governor of North Dakota were largely spent attacking the $300,000 debt inherited by Hanna upon assuming office. At the end of four years, the entire amount was paid off; in addition, the bonded debt of nearly one million dollars was reduced to $462,000. A teacher's retirement and insurance fund was created and an inheritance tax law was sanctioned.

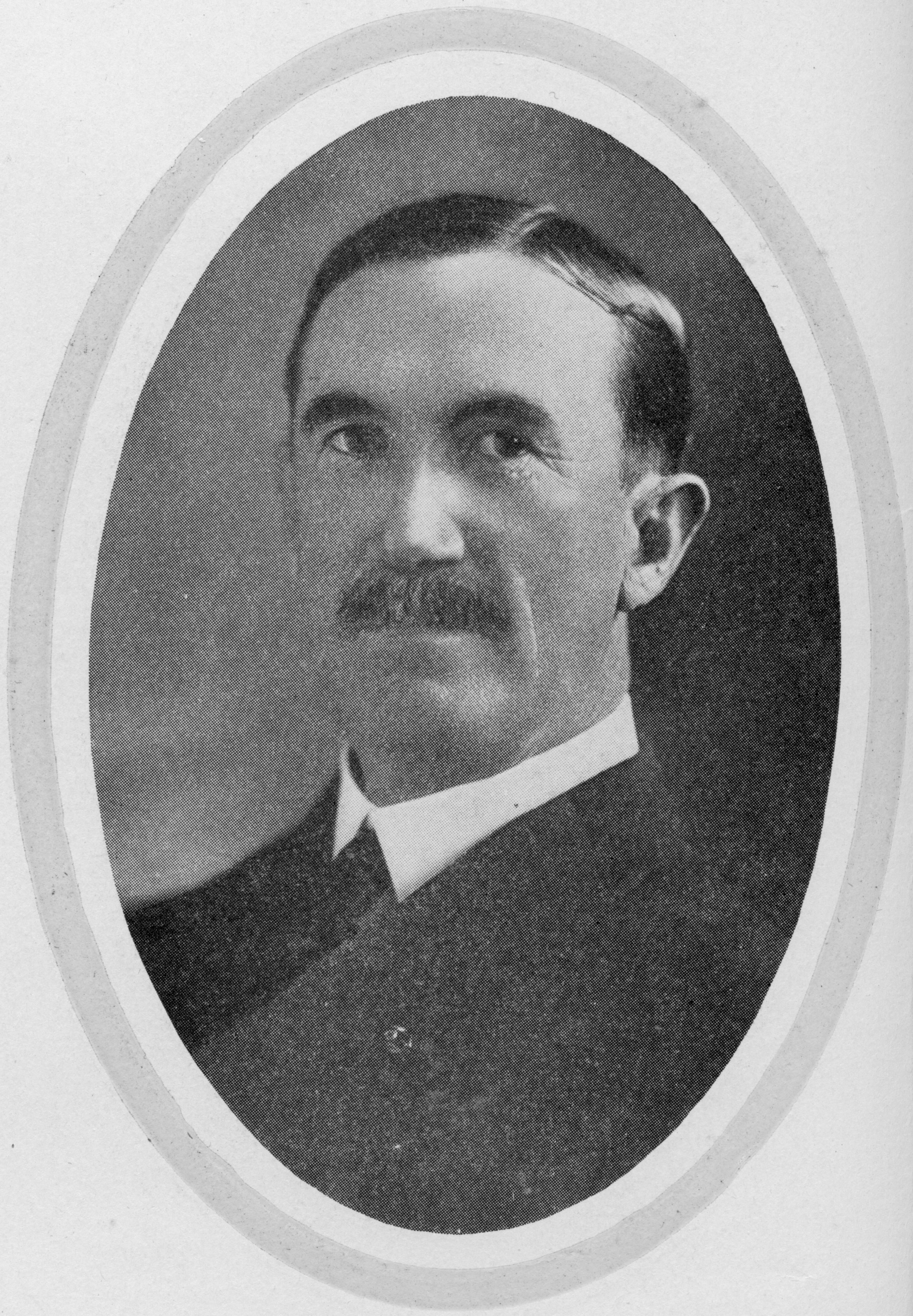
Portrait of Gov. L. B. Hanna, 1913

During Hanna's term the governor, his family, and a committee went to Norway. On July 4, 1914, at Christiania (Oslo), they presented the people of Norway with a statue of Abraham Lincoln. The statue, by North Dakota sculptor Paul Fjelde, is located in Frogner Park in Oslo.

== Legacy and death ==
King Haakon VII decorated Gov. Hanna as a Knight Grand Cross of the Royal Norwegian Order of St. Olav of the First Rank. Governor Hanna served as chairman of the Liberty Loan drives in 1917 and 1918. During World War I he served in France as a captain in the American Red Cross. He was cited as an officer of the French Legion of Honor by the French government. Hanna continued his business interests in agriculture, banking, and other enterprises until his retirement. In 1924, Louis Hanna handled presidential campaign of Calvin Coolidge in North Dakota. He died in 1948, aged 86, in Fargo, North Dakota. He is buried in Riverside Cemetery, Fargo, Cass County, North Dakota.

Party political offices
Preceded by C. A. Johnson	Republican nominee for Governor of North Dakota; 1912, 1914	Succeeded by Lynn Frazier
Preceded by Edwin F. Ladd	Republican nominee for U.S. Senator from North Dakota (Class 3); 1926	Succeeded by Gerald Nye
U.S. House of Representatives
Preceded by Thomas Frank Marshall	Member of the U.S. House of Representatives from North Dakota's at-large congressional district 1909–1913	Succeeded by Henry Thomas Helgesen
Political offices
Preceded by John Burke	Governor of North Dakota; 1913–1917	Succeeded by Lynn Frazier
