= 1970 United States House of Representatives elections =

House elections for the 92nd U.S. Congress

- November 3, 1970

All 435 seats in the United States House of Representatives 218 seats needed for a majority
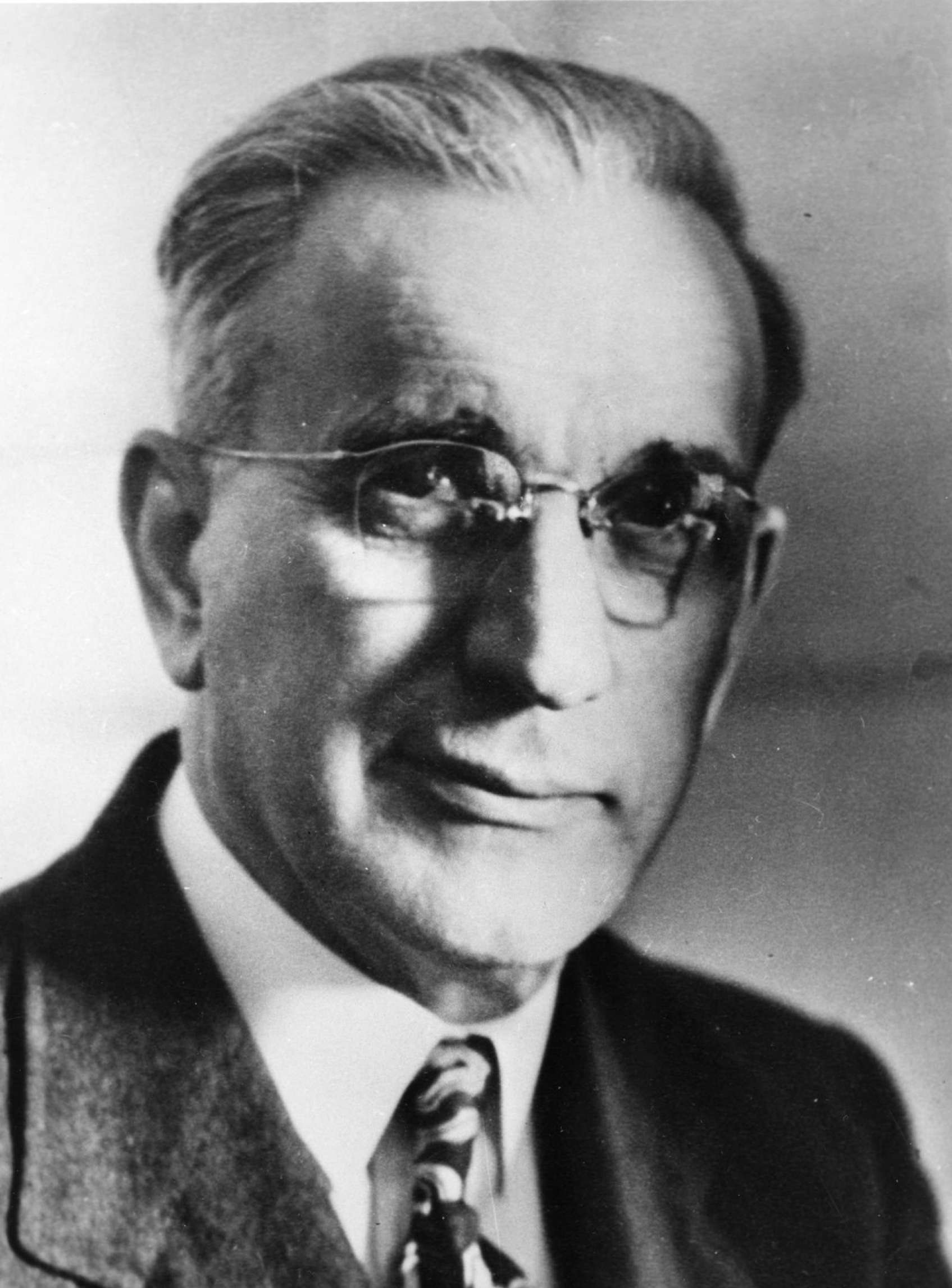

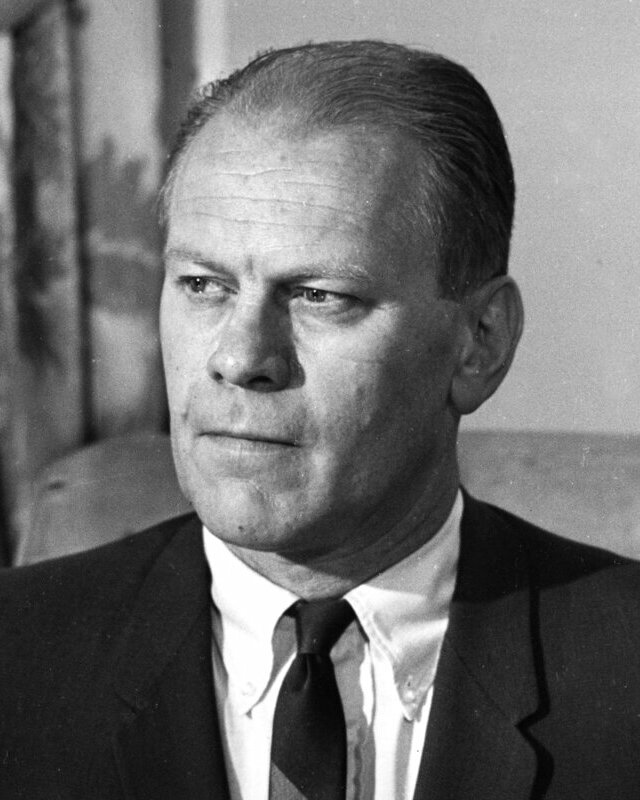
	Majority party	Minority party
Leader	John McCormack (retired)	Gerald Ford
Party	Democratic	Republican
Leader since	January 10, 1962	January 3, 1965
Leader's seat	Massachusetts 9th	Michigan 5th
Last election	243 seats	192 seats
Seats won	255	180
Seat change	▲12	▼12
Popular vote	29,080,212	24,352,657
Percentage	53.6%	44.9%
Swing	▲3.4pp	▼3.6pp
- Results: Democratic hold Democratic gain Republican hold Republican gain
Speaker before election
John McCormack
Democratic
Elected Speaker
Carl Albert
Democratic

The 1970 United States House of Representatives elections was an election for the United States House of Representatives held on November 3, 1970, to elect members to serve in the 92nd United States Congress. They occurred in the middle of Richard M. Nixon's first term as president. His party, the Republican Party, lost a net of 12 seats to the Democratic Party, which thereby increased its majority in the House.

Pursuant to the Uniform Congressional District Act, this was the first House election since the 1930 elections in which all 50 states used a single-member-district system to elect representatives instead of using at-large congressional districts.

== Overall results ==
401 incumbent members sought reelection, but 10 were defeated in primaries and 12 defeated in the general election for a total of 379 incumbents winning.

↓
255	180
Democratic	Republican

Summary of the November 3, 1970, election results

Parties	Seats				Popular Vote		
Parties	1968	1970	Change	Strength	Vote	%	Change
Democratic Party	243	255	▲12	58.6%	29,080,212	53.6%	▲3.4%
Republican Party	192	180	▼12	41.4%	24,352,657	44.9%	▼3.6%
Conservative Party	——	——	——	——	230,180	0.4%	Steady
American Independent Party	——	——	——	——	132,992	0.2%	▼0.1%
Independent	——	——	——	——	122,430	0.2%	▲0.1%
Liberal Party	——	——	——	——	67,696	0.1%	Steady
National Democratic Party	——	——	——	——	67,228	0.1%	Steady
Constitution Party	——	——	——	——	46,100	0.1%	Steady
Peace and Freedom Party	——	——	——	——	40,763	0.1%	Steady
Socialist Workers Party	——	——	——	——	9,675	<0.1%	Steady
Raza Unida Party	——	——	——	——	7,085	<0.1%	Steady
A Public Party	——	——	——	——	5,774	<0.1%	Steady
Right to Life Party	——	——	——	——	5,342	<0.1%	Steady
Dodd Independent Party	——	——	——	——	5,062	<0.1%	Steady
Liberty Union Party	——	——	——	——	4,315	<0.1%	Steady
Urban Tax Reform Party	——	——	——	——	3,675	<0.1%	Steady
American Party	——	——	——	——	2,759	<0.1%	Steady
Common Peoples' Party	——	——	——	——	1,727	<0.1%	Steady
Buffalo Party	——	——	——	——	1,724	<0.1%	Steady
Iowa New Party	——	——	——	——	1,262	<0.1%	Steady
Socialist Labor Party	——	——	——	——	973	<0.1%	Steady
For the People Party	——	——	——	——	823	<0.1%	Steady
The O'Hara Bill Party	——	——	——	——	518	<0.1%	Steady
Communist Party	——	——	——	——	374	<0.1%	Steady
Progressive Labor Socialist Party	——	——	——	——	208	<0.1%	Steady
Others	——	——	——	——	67,331	0.1%	▲0.1%
Total	435	435	0	100.0%	54,258,885	100.0%	——
Source: Election Statistics – Office of the Clerk

Popular vote
Democratic	53.60%
Republican	44.88%
Others	1.52%

House seats
Democratic	58.62%
Republican	41.38%

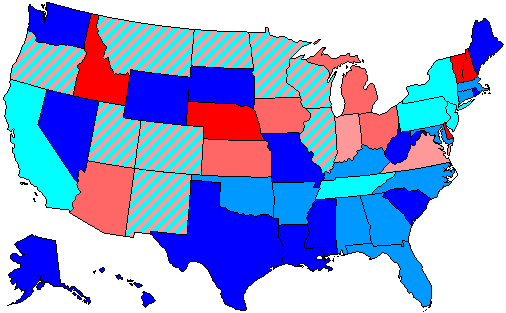
House seats by party holding plurality in state: 80+ to 100% Republican / 80+ to 100% Democratic; 60+ to 80% Republican / 60+ to 80% Democratic; 50+ to 60% Republican / 50+ to 60% Democratic; Stripes: 50% each

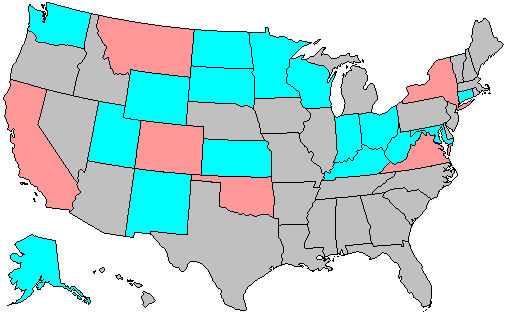
6+ Republican gain / 6+ Democratic gain; 3-5 Republican gain / 3-5 Democratic gain; 1-2 Republican gain / 1-2 Democratic gain; no net change

== Special elections ==
District	Incumbent			This race	
District	Member	Party	First elected	Results	Candidates
California 24	Glenard P. Lipscomb	Republican	1953 (special)	Incumbent died February 1, 1970. New member elected June 30, 1970. Republican hold.	✓ John H. Rousselot (Republican) 68.2%; Myrlie Evers (Democratic) 31.8%
California 35	James B. Utt	Republican	1952	Incumbent died March 1, 1970. New member elected June 30, 1970. Republican hold.	✓ John G. Schmitz (Republican) 72.4%; David N. Hartman (Democratic) 27.6%
Connecticut 2	William St. Onge	Democratic	1962	Incumbent died May 1, 1970. New member elected November 3, 1970. Republican gain.	✓ Robert H. Steele (Republican) 53.3%; John F. Pickett Jr. (Democratic) 46.7%
Illinois 6	Daniel J. Ronan	Democratic	1964	Incumbent died August 13, 1969. New member elected November 3, 1970. Democratic hold.	✓ George W. Collins (Democratic) 55.7%; Alex J. Zabrosky (Republican) 44.3%
New Jersey 6	William T. Cahill	Republican	1958	Incumbent resigned January 19, 1970, when elected governor of New Jersey. New member elected November 3, 1970. Republican hold.	✓ Edwin B. Forsythe (Republican) 54.8%; Charles B. Yates (Democratic) 45.2%
Ohio 19	Michael J. Kirwan	Democratic	1936	Incumbent died July 27, 1970. New member elected November 3, 1970. Democratic hold.	✓ Charles J. Carney (Democratic) 58.4%; Margaret Dennison (Republican) 41.6%
Pennsylvania 9	George Watkins	Republican	1964	Incumbent died August 7, 1970. New member elected November 3, 1970. Republican hold.	✓ John H. Ware III (Republican) 58.2%; Louis F. Waldmann (Democratic) 39.4%; Benjamin H. Winkleman (Constitution) 2.3%

== Alabama ==
District	Incumbent			This race	
District	Member	Party	First elected	Results	Candidates
Alabama 1	Jack Edwards	Republican	1964	Incumbent re-elected.	✓ Jack Edwards (Republican) 60.6%; John M. Tyson (Democratic) 26.2%; Noble Beasley (National Democratic) 13.2%
Alabama 2	William Louis Dickinson	Republican	1964	Incumbent re-elected.	✓ William Louis Dickinson (Republican) 61.4%; Albert J. Winfield (Democratic) 25.6%; Percy Smith Jr. (National Democratic) 13.1%
Alabama 3	George W. Andrews	Democratic	1944	Incumbent re-elected.	✓ George W. Andrews (Democratic) 89.1%; Detroit Lee (National Democratic) 10.9%
Alabama 4	Bill Nichols	Democratic	1966	Incumbent re-elected.	✓ Bill Nichols (Democratic) 83.7%; Glenn Andrews (Republican) 14.2%; Wilpha Harrel Jr. (National Democratic) 2.1%
Alabama 5	Walter Flowers	Democratic	1968	Incumbent re-elected.	✓ Walter Flowers (Democratic) 75.9%; T. Y. Rogers (National Democratic) 24.1%
Alabama 6	John Hall Buchanan Jr.	Republican	1964	Incumbent re-elected.	✓ John Hall Buchanan Jr. (Republican) 60.1%; John C. Schmarkey (Democratic) 37.7%; Dan Moore (Conservative) 2.3%
Alabama 7	Tom Bevill	Democratic	1966	Incumbent re-elected.	✓ Tom Bevill (Democratic); Unopposed
Alabama 8	Robert E. Jones Jr.	Democratic	1947 (Special)	Incumbent re-elected.	✓ Robert E. Jones Jr. (Democratic) 84.8%; Ken Hearn (Conservative) 8.4%; Thornton Stanley (National Democratic) 5.4%; Thomas Lee Harris (Independent) 1.3%

== Alaska ==
District	Incumbent			This race	
District	Member	Party	First elected	Results	Candidates
Alaska at-large	Howard Wallace Pollock	Republican	1966	Incumbent retired to run for Governor of Alaska. Democratic gain.	✓ Nick Begich (Democratic) 55.1%; Frank Murkowski (Republican) 44.9%

== Arizona ==
District	Incumbent			This race	
District	Member	Party	First elected	Results	Candidates
Arizona 1	John Jacob Rhodes	Republican	1952	Incumbent re-elected.	✓ John Jacob Rhodes (Republican) 68.5%; Gerald A. Pollock (Democratic) 31.5%
Arizona 2	Mo Udall	Democratic	1961 (Special)	Incumbent re-elected.	✓ Mo Udall (Democratic) 69.0%; Morris Herring (Republican) 29.9%; Cliff Thomallo (American Independent) 1.1%
Arizona 3	Sam Steiger	Republican	1966	Incumbent re-elected.	✓ Sam Steiger (Republican) 62.1%; Orren Beatty (Democratic) 37.9%

== Arkansas ==
District	Incumbent			This race	
District	Member	Party	First elected	Results	Candidates
Arkansas 1	William Vollie Alexander Jr.	Democratic	1968	Incumbent re-elected.	✓ William Vollie Alexander Jr. (Democratic); Unopposed
Arkansas 2	Wilbur Mills	Democratic	1938	Incumbent re-elected.	✓ Wilbur Mills (Democratic); Unopposed
Arkansas 3	John Paul Hammerschmidt	Republican	1966	Incumbent re-elected.	✓ John Paul Hammerschmidt (Republican) 66.7%; Donald Poe (Democratic) 33.3%
Arkansas 4	David Pryor	Democratic	1966	Incumbent re-elected.	✓ David Pryor (Democratic); Unopposed

== California ==
One Democratic seat was lost to Republicans. Democrats, therefore, retained a 20–18 margin over Republicans.

District	Incumbent			This race	
District	Member	Party	First elected	Results	Candidates
California 1	Donald H. Clausen	Republican	1963 (Special)	Incumbent re-elected.	✓ Donald H. Clausen (Republican) 63.4%; William M. Kortum (Democratic) 36.6%
California 2	Harold T. Johnson	Democratic	1958	Incumbent re-elected.	✓ Harold T. Johnson (Democratic) 77.9%; Lloyd E. Gilbert (Republican) 19.2%; Jack R. Carigg (American Independent) 2.9%
California 3	John E. Moss	Democratic	1952	Incumbent re-elected.	✓ John E. Moss (Democratic) 61.6%; Elmore J. Duffy (Republican) 36.6%; Allen E. Priest (American Independent) 1.9%
California 4	Robert L. Leggett	Democratic	1962	Incumbent re-elected.	✓ Robert L. Leggett (Democratic) 68.0%; Andrew Gyorke (Republican) 32.0%
California 5	Phillip Burton	Democratic	1964	Incumbent re-elected.	✓ Phillip Burton (Democratic) 70.8%; John E. Parks (Republican) 29.2%
California 6	William S. Mailliard	Republican	1952	Incumbent re-elected.	✓ William S. Mailliard (Republican) 53.4%; Russell R. Miller (Democratic) 46.6%
California 7	Jeffery Cohelan	Democratic	1958	Incumbent lost renomination. Democratic hold.	✓ Ron Dellums (Democratic) 57.3%; John E. Healy (Republican) 41.3%; Sarah Scahill (Peace and Freedom) 1.4%
California 8	George P. Miller	Democratic	1944	Incumbent re-elected.	✓ George P. Miller (Democratic) 69.0%; Michael A. Crane (Republican) 31.0%
California 9	Don Edwards	Democratic	1962	Incumbent re-elected.	✓ Don Edwards (Democratic) 69.1%; Mark Guerra (Republican) 28.5%; Edmon V. Kaiser (American Independent) 2.3%
California 10	Charles S. Gubser	Republican	1952	Incumbent re-elected.	✓ Charles S. Gubser (Republican) 62.0%; Stuart D. McLean (Democratic) 36.8%; Joyce W. Stancliffe (American Independent) 1.2%
California 11	Pete McCloskey	Republican	1967 (Special)	Incumbent re-elected.	✓ Pete McCloskey (Republican) 77.5%; Robert E. Gomperts (Democratic) 21.0%; Others 1.5%
California 12	Burt L. Talcott	Republican	1962	Incumbent re-elected.	✓ Burt L. Talcott (Republican) 63.6%; O'Brien Riordan (Democratic) 33.9%; Herbert H. Foster Jr. (Peace and Freedom) 2.5%
California 13	Charles M. Teague	Republican	1954	Incumbent re-elected.	✓ Charles M. Teague (Republican) 58.2%; Gary K. Hart (Democratic) 40.8%; Maude I. Jordet (American Independent) 1.1%
California 14	Jerome Waldie	Democratic	1966	Incumbent re-elected.	✓ Jerome Waldie (Democratic) 74.5%; Byron D. Athan (Republican) 25.5%
California 15	John J. McFall	Democratic	1956	Incumbent re-elected.	✓ John J. McFall (Democratic) 63.1%; Sam Van Dyken (Republican) 35.6%; Francis E. "Gill" Gillings (American Independent) 1.3%
California 16	B. F. Sisk	Democratic	1954	Incumbent re-elected.	✓ B. F. Sisk (Democratic) 66.4%; Phillip V. Sanchez (Republican) 30.6%; James W. Scott (American Independent) 3.0%
California 17	Glenn M. Anderson	Democratic	1968	Incumbent re-elected.	✓ Glenn M. Anderson (Democratic) 62.2%; Michael C. Donaldson (Republican) 35.5%; Robert W. Copeland (American Independent) 1.3%; Thomas E. Mathews (Peace and Freedom) 1.0%
California 18	Bob Mathias	Republican	1966	Incumbent re-elected.	✓ Bob Mathias (Republican) 63.2%; Milton Spartacus Miller (Democratic) 35.5%; Nora E. Hensley (American Independent) 1.3%
California 19	Chet Holifield	Democratic	1942	Incumbent re-elected.	✓ Chet Holifield (Democratic) 70.4%; Bill Jones (Republican) 29.6%
California 20	H. Allen Smith	Republican	1956	Incumbent re-elected.	✓ H. Allen Smith (Republican) 69.1%; Michael M. Stolzberg (Democratic) 29.7%; Earl C. Harper (American Independent) 1.2%
California 21	Augustus Hawkins	Democratic	1962	Incumbent re-elected.	✓ Augustus Hawkins (Democratic) 94.5%; Southey M. Johnson (Republican) 5.5%
California 22	James C. Corman	Democratic	1960	Incumbent re-elected.	✓ James C. Corman (Democratic) 59.4%; Tom Hayden (Republican) 39.5%; Callis R. Johnson (American Independent) 1.2%
California 23	Del M. Clawson	Republican	1963 (Special)	Incumbent re-elected.	✓ Del M. Clawson (Republican) 63.3%; G. L. "Jerry" Chapman (Democratic) 36.7%
California 24	John H. Rousselot	Republican	1960; 1962 (defeated); 1970 (Special)	Incumbent re-elected.	✓ John H. Rousselot (Republican) 65.1%; Myrlie Evers (Democratic) 32.4%; Brian Scanlon (American Independent) 1.6%; Harold Kaplan (Peace and Freedom) 1.0%
California 25	Charles E. Wiggins	Republican	1966	Incumbent re-elected.	✓ Charles E. Wiggins (Republican) 63.3%; Leslie W. Craven (Democratic) 35.1%; Kevin Scanlon (American Independent) 1.6%
California 26	Thomas M. Rees	Democratic	1965 (Special)	Incumbent re-elected.	✓ Thomas M. Rees (Democratic) 71.3%; Nathaniel Jay Friedman (Republican) 25.8%; Lewis B. McCammon (Peace and Freedom) 2.0%; Howard E. Hallinan (American Independent) 0.9%
California 27	Barry Goldwater Jr.	Republican	1969 (Special)	Incumbent re-elected.	✓ Barry Goldwater Jr. (Republican) 66.7%; Natalie Kimmel (Democratic) 30.5%; Edward Richer (Peace and Freedom) 1.6%; John H. Hind (American Independent) 1.3%
California 28	Alphonzo E. Bell Jr.	Republican	1960	Incumbent re-elected.	✓ Alphonzo E. Bell Jr. (Republican) 69.3%; Don McLaughlin (Democratic) 25.9%; Derek A. Gordon (American Independent) 2.6%; Jane E. Gordon (Peace and Freedom) 2.2%
California 29	George Brown Jr.	Democratic	1962	Incumbent retired to run for U.S. senator. Democratic hold.	✓ George E. Danielson (Democratic) 62.6%; Tom McMann (Republican) 37.4%
California 30	Edward R. Roybal	Democratic	1962	Incumbent re-elected.	✓ Edward R. Roybal (Democratic) 68.3%; Samuel M. Cavnar (Republican) 29.9%; Boris Belousov (American Independent) 1.8%
California 31	Charles H. Wilson	Democratic	1962	Incumbent re-elected.	✓ Charles H. Wilson (Democratic) 73.2%; Fred L. Casmir (Republican) 26.8%
California 32	Craig Hosmer	Republican	1952	Incumbent re-elected.	✓ Craig Hosmer (Republican) 71.5%; Walter L. Mallonee (Democratic) 26.5%; John S. Donohue (Peace and Freedom) 1.9%
California 33	Jerry Pettis	Republican	1966	Incumbent re-elected.	✓ Jerry Pettis (Republican) 72.2%; Chester M. Wright (Democratic) 27.8%
California 34	Richard T. Hanna	Democratic	1962	Incumbent re-elected.	✓ Richard T. Hanna (Democratic) 54.5%; Bill J. Teague (Republican) 44.0%; Lee R. Rayburn (American Independent) 1.5%
California 35	John G. Schmitz	Republican	1970	Incumbent re-elected.	✓ John G. Schmitz (Republican) 67.0%; Thomas B. Lenhart (Democratic) 30.3%; Francis R. Halpern (Peace and Freedom) 2.7%
California 36	Bob Wilson	Republican	1952	Incumbent re-elected.	✓ Bob Wilson (Republican) 71.5%; Daniel K. Hostetter (Democratic) 24.2%; Walter H. Koppelman (Peace and Freedom) 2.8%; Orville J. Davis (American Independent) 1.5%
California 37	Lionel Van Deerlin	Democratic	1962	Incumbent re-elected.	✓ Lionel Van Deerlin (Democratic) 72.1%; James B. Kuhn (Republican) 24.5%; Faye B. Brice (American Independent) 2.3%; Fritjof Thygeson (Peace and Freedom) 1.1%
California 38	John V. Tunney	Democratic	1964	Incumbent retired to run for U.S. senator. Republican gain.	✓ Victor Veysey (Republican) 49.8%; David A. Tunno (Democratic) 48.8%; William Emery Pasley (American Independent) 1.4%

== Colorado ==
District	Incumbent			This race	
District	Member	Party	First elected	Results	Candidates
Colorado 1	Byron G. Rogers	Democratic	1950	Incumbent lost renomination. Republican gain.	✓ Mike McKevitt (Republican) 51.5%; Craig S. Barnes (Democratic) 45.3%; Salvadore Carpio Jr. (La Raza Unida) 3.2%
Colorado 2	Donald G. Brotzman	Republican	1962; 1964 (defeated); 1966	Incumbent re-elected.	✓ Donald G. Brotzman (Republican) 63.4%; Richard G. Gebhardt (Democratic) 36.6%
Colorado 3	Frank Evans	Democratic	1964	Incumbent re-elected.	✓ Frank Evans (Democratic) 63.6%; John C. Mitchell Jr. (Republican) 33.4%; Martin P. Serna (La Raza Unida) 1.3%; Walter N. Cranson (Independent) 1.2%; Henry John Olshaw (Independent) 0.5%
Colorado 4	Wayne N. Aspinall	Democratic	1948	Incumbent re-elected.	✓ Wayne N. Aspinall (Democratic) 55.1%; Bill Gossard (Republican) 44.9%

== Connecticut ==
District	Incumbent			This race	
District	Member	Party	First elected	Results	Candidates
Connecticut 1	Emilio Q. Daddario	Democratic	1958	Incumbent retired to run for Governor of Connecticut. Democratic hold.	✓ William R. Cotter (Democratic) 48.7%; Antonina Uccello (Republican) 48.1%; Edward T. Coll (Independent) 3.2%
Connecticut 2	William St. Onge	Democratic	1962	Incumbent died. Republican gain.	✓ Robert H. Steele (Republican) 53.3%; John F. Pickett (Democratic) 46.7%
Connecticut 3	Robert Giaimo	Democratic	1958	Incumbent re-elected.	✓ Robert Giaimo (Democratic) 54.6%; Robert J. Dunn (Republican) 42.3%; Richard P. Antonetti (Independent) 3.1%
Connecticut 4	Lowell Weicker	Republican	1968	Incumbent retired to run for U.S. senator. Republican hold.	✓ Stewart McKinney (Republican) 56.6%; T. F. Gilroy Daly (Democratic) 42.6%; Eileen M. Emard (American Independent) 0.8%
Connecticut 5	John S. Monagan	Democratic	1958	Incumbent re-elected.	✓ John S. Monagan (Democratic) 54.7%; James T. Patterson (Republican) 44.3%; Alphonzo Avitabile (Independent) 1.0%
Connecticut 6	Thomas Meskill	Republican	1966	Incumbent retired to run for Governor of Connecticut. Democratic gain.	✓ Ella Grasso (Democratic) 51.1%; Richard C. Kilbourn (Republican) 48.9%

== Delaware ==
District	Incumbent			This race	
District	Member	Party	First elected	Results	Candidates
Delaware at-large	William Roth	Republican	1966	Incumbent retired to run for U.S. senator. Republican hold.	✓ Pete du Pont (Republican) 53.7%; John D. Daniello (Democratic) 44.6%; Walter Hoey (American) 1.7%

== Florida ==
District	Incumbent			This race	
District	Member	Party	First elected	Results	Candidates
Florida 1	Bob Sikes	Democratic	1940; 1944 (resigned); 1974	Incumbent re-elected.	✓ Bob Sikes (Democratic) 80.2%; Sam Shuemake (Republican) 19.8%
Florida 2	Don Fuqua	Democratic	1962	Incumbent re-elected.	✓ Don Fuqua (Democratic); Unopposed
Florida 3	Charles E. Bennett	Democratic	1948	Incumbent re-elected.	✓ Charles E. Bennett (Democratic); Unopposed
Florida 4	Bill Chappell	Democratic	1968	Incumbent re-elected.	✓ Bill Chappell (Democratic) 57.8%; Leonard V. Wood (Republican) 42.2%
Florida 5	Louis Frey Jr.	Republican	1968	Incumbent re-elected.	✓ Louis Frey Jr. (Republican) 75.8%; Ron Girod (Democratic) 24.2%
Florida 6	Sam Gibbons	Democratic	1962	Incumbent re-elected.	✓ Sam Gibbons (Democratic) 72.3%; Robert A. Carter (Republican) 27.7%
Florida 7	James A. Haley	Democratic	1952	Incumbent re-elected.	✓ James A. Haley (Democratic) 53.4%; Joe Z. Lovingood (Republican) 46.6%
Florida 8	William C. Cramer	Republican	1954	Incumbent retired to run for U.S. senator. Republican hold.	✓ Bill Young (Republican) 67.2%; Ted A. Bailey (Democratic) 32.8%
Florida 9	Paul Rogers	Democratic	1954	Incumbent re-elected.	✓ Paul Rogers (Democratic) 70.6%; Emil F. Danciu (Republican) 29.4%
Florida 10	J. Herbert Burke	Republican	1966	Incumbent re-elected.	✓ J. Herbert Burke (Republican) 54.1%; James J. Ward Jr. (Democratic) 45.9%
Florida 11	Claude Pepper	Democratic	1962	Incumbent re-elected.	✓ Claude Pepper (Democratic); Unopposed
Florida 12	Dante Fascell	Democratic	1954	Incumbent re-elected.	✓ Dante Fascell (Democratic) 71.7%; Robert A. Zinzell (Republican) 28.3%

== Georgia ==
District	Incumbent			This race	
District	Member	Party	First elected	Results	Candidates
Georgia 1	George Elliott Hagan	Democratic	1960	Incumbent re-elected.	✓ George Elliott Hagan (Democratic); Unopposed
Georgia 2	Maston E. O'Neal Jr.	Democratic	1964	Incumbent retired. Democratic hold.	✓ Dawson Mathis (Democratic) 91.8%; Thomas Ragsdale (Republican) 8.2%
Georgia 3	Jack Brinkley	Democratic	1966	Incumbent re-elected.	✓ Jack Brinkley (Democratic); Unopposed
Georgia 4	Benjamin B. Blackburn	Republican	1966	Incumbent re-elected.	✓ Benjamin B. Blackburn (Republican) 65.2%; Franklin Shumake (Democratic) 34.8%
Georgia 5	Fletcher Thompson	Republican	1966	Incumbent re-elected.	✓ Fletcher Thompson (Republican) 57.4%; Andrew Young (Democratic) 42.6%
Georgia 6	John Flynt	Democratic	1954	Incumbent re-elected.	✓ John Flynt (Democratic); Unopposed
Georgia 7	John William Davis	Democratic	1960	Incumbent re-elected.	✓ John William Davis (Democratic) 72.5%; Dick Fullerton (Republican) 27.5%
Georgia 8	W. S. Stuckey Jr.	Democratic	1966	Incumbent re-elected.	✓ W. S. Stuckey Jr. (Democratic); Unopposed
Georgia 9	Phillip M. Landrum	Democratic	1952	Incumbent re-elected.	✓ Phillip M. Landrum (Democratic) 71.7%; Bob Cooper (Republican) 28.3%
Georgia 10	Robert Grier Stephens Jr.	Democratic	1960	Incumbent re-elected.	✓ Robert Grier Stephens Jr. (Democratic); Unopposed

== Hawaii ==
District	Incumbent			This race	
District	Member	Party	First elected	Results	Candidates
Hawaii 1	Spark Matsunaga; Redistricted from the at-large district	Democratic	1962	Incumbent re-elected.	✓ Spark Matsunaga (Democratic) 72.9%; Richard K. Cockey (Republican) 27.1%
Hawaii 2	Patsy Mink; Redistricted from the at-large district	Democratic	1964	Incumbent re-elected.	✓ Patsy Mink (Democratic); Unopposed

== Idaho ==
District	Incumbent			This race	
District	Member	Party	First elected	Results	Candidates
Idaho 1	James A. McClure	Republican	1966	Incumbent re-elected.	✓ James A. McClure (Republican) 58.2%; William J. Brauner (Democratic) 41.8%
Idaho 2	Orval H. Hansen	Republican	1968	Incumbent re-elected.	✓ Orval H. Hansen (Republican) 65.8%; Marden E. Wells (Democratic) 31.6%; Joel Anderson (American Independent) 2.6%

== Illinois ==
District	Incumbent			This race	
District	Member	Party	First elected	Results	Candidates
Illinois 1	William L. Dawson	Democratic	1942	Incumbent retired. Democratic hold.	✓ Ralph Metcalfe (Democratic) 91.0%; Janet Roberts Jennings (Republican) 9.0%
Illinois 2	Abner Mikva	Democratic	1968	Incumbent re-elected.	✓ Abner Mikva (Democratic) 74.7%; Harold E. Marks (Republican) 25.3%
Illinois 3	William T. Murphy	Democratic	1958	Incumbent retired. Democratic hold.	✓ Morgan F. Murphy (Democratic) 68.9%; Robert P. Rowan (Republican) 31.1%
Illinois 4	Ed Derwinski	Republican	1958	Incumbent re-elected.	✓ Ed Derwinski (Republican) 68.0%; Melvin W. Morgan (Democratic) 32.0%
Illinois 5	John C. Kluczynski	Democratic	1950	Incumbent re-elected.	✓ John C. Kluczynski (Democratic) 68.8%; Edmund W. Ochenkowski (Republican) 31.2%
Illinois 6	Daniel J. Ronan	Democratic	1964	Incumbent died. Democratic hold.	✓ George W. Collins (Democratic) 56.2%; Alex J. Zabrosky (Republican) 43.8%
Illinois 7	Frank Annunzio	Democratic	1964	Incumbent re-elected.	✓ Frank Annunzio (Democratic) 87.3%; Thomas J. Lento (Republican) 12.7%
Illinois 8	Dan Rostenkowski	Democratic	1958	Incumbent re-elected.	✓ Dan Rostenkowski (Democratic) 73.9%; Henry S. Kaplinski (Republican) 26.1%
Illinois 9	Sidney R. Yates	Democratic	1948; 1962 (retired); 1964	Incumbent re-elected.	✓ Sidney R. Yates (Democratic) 75.8%; Edward Wolbank (Republican) 24.2%
Illinois 10	Harold R. Collier	Republican	1956	Incumbent re-elected.	✓ Harold R. Collier (Republican) 62.2%; R. G. Patrick Logan (Democratic) 37.8%
Illinois 11	Roman Pucinski	Democratic	1958	Incumbent re-elected.	✓ Roman Pucinski (Democratic) 71.9%; James R. Mason (Republican) 28.1%
Illinois 12	Robert McClory	Republican	1962	Incumbent re-elected.	✓ Robert McClory (Republican) 62.1%; James J. Cone (Democratic) 37.9%
Illinois 13	Phil Crane	Republican	1969 (Special)	Incumbent re-elected.	✓ Phil Crane (Republican) 58.0%; Edward A. Warman (Democratic) 42.0%
Illinois 14	John N. Erlenborn	Republican	1964	Incumbent re-elected.	✓ John N. Erlenborn (Republican) 63.6%; William J. Adelman (Democratic) 36.4%
Illinois 15	Charlotte Thompson Reid	Republican	1962	Incumbent re-elected.	✓ Charlotte Thompson Reid (Republican) 68.9%; James E. Todd (Democratic) 31.1%
Illinois 16	John B. Anderson	Republican	1960	Incumbent re-elected.	✓ John B. Anderson (Republican) 66.8%; John E. Devine Jr. (Democratic) 33.2%
Illinois 17	Leslie C. Arends	Republican	1934	Incumbent re-elected.	✓ Leslie C. Arends (Republican) 62.3%; Lester A. Hawthorne (Democratic) 37.7%
Illinois 18	Robert H. Michel	Republican	1956	Incumbent re-elected.	✓ Robert H. Michel (Republican) 66.1%; Rosa Lee Fox (Democratic) 33.9%
Illinois 19	Tom Railsback	Republican	1966	Incumbent re-elected.	✓ Tom Railsback (Republican) 68.2%; James L. Shaw (Democratic) 31.8%
Illinois 20	Paul Findley	Republican	1960	Incumbent re-elected.	✓ Paul Findley (Republican) 67.5%; Billie M. Cox (Democratic) 32.5%
Illinois 21	Kenneth J. Gray	Democratic	1954	Incumbent re-elected.	✓ Kenneth J. Gray (Democratic) 62.5%; Fred Evans (Republican) 37.5%
Illinois 22	William L. Springer	Republican	1950	Incumbent re-elected.	✓ William L. Springer (Republican) 59.0%; Robert C. Miller (Democratic) 41.0%
Illinois 23	George E. Shipley	Democratic	1958	Incumbent re-elected.	✓ George E. Shipley (Democratic) 54.0%; Phyllis Schlafly (Republican) 46.0%
Illinois 24	Melvin Price	Democratic	1944	Incumbent re-elected.	✓ Melvin Price (Democratic) 74.2%; Scott R. Randolph (Republican) 25.8%

== Indiana ==
District	Incumbent			This race	
District	Member	Party	First elected	Results	Candidates
Indiana 1	Ray Madden	Democratic	1942	Incumbent re-elected.	✓ Ray Madden (Democratic) 65.6%; Eugene M. Kirtland (Republican) 34.4%
Indiana 2	Earl Landgrebe	Republican	1968	Incumbent re-elected.	✓ Earl Landgrebe (Republican) 50.4%; Philip A. Sprague (Democratic) 49.6%
Indiana 3	John Brademas	Democratic	1958	Incumbent re-elected.	✓ John Brademas (Democratic) 57.5%; Don M. Newman (Republican) 42.5%
Indiana 4	E. Ross Adair	Republican	1950	Incumbent lost re-election. Democratic gain.	✓ J. Edward Roush (Democratic) 51.9%; E. Ross Adair (Republican) 48.1%
Indiana 5	Richard L. Roudebush	Republican	1960	Incumbent retired to run for U.S. senator. Republican hold.	✓ Elwood Hillis (Republican) 56.0%; Kathleen Z. Williams (Democratic) 44.0%
Indiana 6	William G. Bray	Republican	1950	Incumbent re-elected.	✓ William G. Bray (Republican) 60.7%; Terrence D. Straub (Democratic) 39.3%
Indiana 7	John T. Myers	Republican	1966	Incumbent re-elected.	✓ John T. Myers (Republican) 57.1%; William T. Roach (Democratic) 42.9%
Indiana 8	Roger H. Zion	Republican	1966	Incumbent re-elected.	✓ Roger H. Zion (Republican) 52.6%; J. David Huber (Democratic) 47.4%
Indiana 9	Lee H. Hamilton	Democratic	1964	Incumbent re-elected.	✓ Lee H. Hamilton (Democratic) 62.5%; Richard B. Wathen (Republican) 37.5%
Indiana 10	David W. Dennis	Republican	1968	Incumbent re-elected.	✓ David W. Dennis (Republican) 50.8%; Philip Sharp (Democratic) 49.2%
Indiana 11	Andrew Jacobs Jr.	Democratic	1964	Incumbent re-elected.	✓ Andrew Jacobs Jr. (Democratic) 58.3%; Dan Burton (Republican) 41.7%

== Iowa ==
District	Incumbent			This race	
District	Member	Party	First elected	Results	Candidates
Iowa 1	Fred Schwengel	Republican	1954; 1964 (defeated); 1966	Incumbent re-elected.	✓ Fred Schwengel (Republican) 49.8%; Edward Mezvinsky (Democratic) 49.2%; Lee E. Foster (American Independent) 1.0%
Iowa 2	John Culver	Democratic	1964	Incumbent re-elected.	✓ John Culver (Democratic) 60.5%; Cole McMartin (Republican) 39.5%
Iowa 3	H. R. Gross	Republican	1948	Incumbent re-elected.	✓ H. R. Gross (Republican) 59.0%; Lyle D. Taylor (Democratic) 41.0%
Iowa 4	John Henry Kyl	Republican	1959 (Special); 1964 (defeated); 1966	Incumbent re-elected.	✓ John Henry Kyl (Republican) 54.6%; Roger Blobaum (Democratic) 45.4%
Iowa 5	Neal Edward Smith	Democratic	1958	Incumbent re-elected.	✓ Neal Edward Smith (Democratic) 64.9%; Don Mahon (Republican) 32.9%; John H. Grant (American Independent) 1.1%; Roy E. Berger (Independent) 1.1%
Iowa 6	Wiley Mayne	Republican	1966	Incumbent re-elected.	✓ Wiley Mayne (Republican) 57.0%; Fred H. Moore (Democratic) 43.0%
Iowa 7	William J. Scherle	Republican	1966	Incumbent re-elected.	✓ William J. Scherle (Republican) 62.7%; Lou Galetich (Democratic) 37.3%

== Kansas ==
District	Incumbent			This race	
District	Member	Party	First elected	Results	Candidates
Kansas 1	Keith Sebelius	Republican	1968	Incumbent re-elected.	✓ Keith Sebelius (Republican) 56.8%; Billy D. Jellison (Democratic) 43.2%
Kansas 2	Chester L. Mize	Republican	1964	Incumbent lost re-election. Democratic gain.	✓ William R. Roy (Democratic) 52.3%; Chester L. Mize (Republican) 45.0%; Fred Kilian (Conservative) 2.7%
Kansas 3	Larry Winn	Republican	1966	Incumbent re-elected.	✓ Larry Winn (Republican) 53.0%; James H. DeCoursey Jr. (Democratic) 45.7%; Warren E. Redding (Conservative) 1.3%
Kansas 4	Garner E. Shriver	Republican	1960	Incumbent re-elected.	✓ Garner E. Shriver (Republican) 63.2%; James C. Juhnke (Democratic) 34.9%; George W. Snell (Conservative) 1.8%
Kansas 5	Joe Skubitz	Republican	1962	Incumbent re-elected.	✓ Joe Skubitz (Republican) 66.1%; T. D. Saar Jr. (Democratic) 33.9%

== Kentucky ==
District	Incumbent			This race	
District	Member	Party	First elected	Results	Candidates
Kentucky 1	Frank Stubblefield	Democratic	1958	Incumbent re-elected.	✓ Frank Stubblefield (Democratic); Unopposed
Kentucky 2	William Natcher	Democratic	1953 (Special)	Incumbent re-elected.	✓ William Natcher (Democratic); Unopposed
Kentucky 3	William Cowger	Republican	1966	Incumbent lost re-election. Democratic gain.	✓ Romano Mazzoli (Democratic) 48.5%; William Cowger (Republican) 48.3%; Ronald W. Watson (American Independent) 3.2%
Kentucky 4	Gene Snyder	Republican	1962; 1964 (defeated); 1966	Incumbent re-elected.	✓ Gene Snyder (Republican) 66.6%; Charles Webster (Democratic) 33.4%
Kentucky 5	Tim Lee Carter	Republican	1964	Incumbent re-elected.	✓ Tim Lee Carter (Republican) 80.4%; Lyle L. Willis (Democratic) 19.6%
Kentucky 6	John C. Watts	Democratic	1951 (Special)	Incumbent re-elected.	✓ John C. Watts (Democratic) 64.9%; Gerald G. Gregory (Republican) 35.1%
Kentucky 7	Carl D. Perkins	Democratic	1948	Incumbent re-elected.	✓ Carl D. Perkins (Democratic) 75.3%; Herbert E. Myers (Republican) 24.7%

== Louisiana ==
District	Incumbent			This race	
District	Member	Party	First elected	Results	Candidates
Louisiana 1	F. Edward Hébert	Democratic	1940	Incumbent re-elected.	✓ F. Edward Hébert (Democratic) 87.3%; Luke Fontana (Independent) 12.7%
Louisiana 2	Hale Boggs	Democratic	1940; 1942 (lost renomination); 1946	Incumbent re-elected.	✓ Hale Boggs (Democratic) 69.3%; Robert E. Lee (Republican) 26.3%; Benjamin E. Smith (Independent) 4.4%
Louisiana 3	Patrick T. Caffery	Democratic	1968	Incumbent re-elected.	✓ Patrick T. Caffery (Democratic); Unopposed
Louisiana 4	Joe Waggonner	Democratic	1961 (Special)	Incumbent re-elected.	✓ Joe Waggonner (Democratic); Unopposed
Louisiana 5	Otto Passman	Democratic	1946	Incumbent re-elected.	✓ Otto Passman (Democratic); Unopposed
Louisiana 6	John Rarick	Democratic	1966	Incumbent re-elected.	✓ John Rarick (Democratic); Unopposed
Louisiana 7	Edwin Edwards	Democratic	1965 (Special)	Incumbent re-elected.	✓ Edwin Edwards (Democratic); Unopposed
Louisiana 8	Speedy Long	Democratic	1964	Incumbent re-elected.	✓ Speedy Long (Democratic); Unopposed

== Maine ==
District	Incumbent			This race	
District	Member	Party	First elected	Results	Candidates
Maine 1	Peter Kyros	Democratic	1966	Incumbent re-elected.	✓ Peter Kyros (Democratic) 59.2%; Ronald T. Speers (Republican) 40.8%
Maine 2	William Hathaway	Democratic	1964	Incumbent re-elected.	✓ William Hathaway (Democratic) 64.2%; Maynard G. Conners (Republican) 35.8%

== Maryland ==
District	Incumbent			This race	
District	Member	Party	First elected	Results	Candidates
Maryland 1	Rogers Morton	Republican	1962	Incumbent re-elected.	✓ Rogers Morton (Republican) 75.6%; David S. Aland (Democratic) 23.7%; Henry Joseph Laque Jr. (American Independent) 0.8%
Maryland 2	Clarence Long	Democratic	1962	Incumbent re-elected.	✓ Clarence Long (Democratic) 68.5%; Ross Z. Pierpont (Republican) 31.5%
Maryland 3	Edward Garmatz	Democratic	1947 (Special)	Incumbent re-elected.	✓ Edward Garmatz (Democratic); Unopposed
Maryland 4	George Hyde Fallon	Democratic	1944	Incumbent lost renomination. Democratic hold.	✓ Paul Sarbanes (Democratic) 70.0%; David Fentress (Republican) 30.0%
Maryland 5	Lawrence Hogan	Republican	1968	Incumbent re-elected.	✓ Lawrence Hogan (Republican) 61.4%; Royal Hart (Democratic) 38.6%
Maryland 6	J. Glenn Beall Jr.	Republican	1968	Incumbent retired to run for U.S. senator. Democratic gain.	✓ Goodloe Byron (Democratic) 50.8%; George R. Hughes Jr. (Republican) 47.6%; Audrey B. Carroll (Republican) 1.6%
Maryland 7	Samuel Friedel	Democratic	1952	Incumbent lost renomination. Democratic hold.	✓ Parren Mitchell (Democratic) 58.7%; Peter Parker (Republican) 41.3%
Maryland 8	Gilbert Gude	Republican	1966	Incumbent re-elected.	✓ Gilbert Gude (Republican) 63.4%; Thomas Hale Boggs Jr. (Democratic) 36.6%

== Massachusetts ==
District	Incumbent			This race	
District	Member	Party	First elected	Results	Candidates
Massachusetts 1	Silvio O. Conte	Republican	1958	Incumbent re-elected.	✓ Silvio O. Conte (Republican); Unopposed
Massachusetts 2	Edward Boland	Democratic	1952	Incumbent re-elected.	✓ Edward Boland (Democratic); Unopposed
Massachusetts 3	Philip J. Philbin	Democratic	1942	Incumbent lost renomination. Defeated as Independent; Democratic hold.	✓ Robert Drinan (Democratic) 37.7%; John McGlennon (Republican) 35.7%; Philip J. Philbin (Independent) 26.7%
Massachusetts 4	Harold Donohue	Democratic	1946	Incumbent re-elected.	✓ Harold Donohue (Democratic) 54.3%; Howard A. Miller Jr. (Republican) 45.7%
Massachusetts 5	F. Bradford Morse	Republican	1960	Incumbent re-elected.	✓ F. Bradford Morse (Republican) 63.3%; Richard Williams (Democratic) 36.7%
Massachusetts 6	Michael J. Harrington	Democratic	1969 (Special)	Incumbent re-elected.	✓ Michael J. Harrington (Democratic) 61.7%; Howard Phillips (Republican) 38.3%
Massachusetts 7	Torbert Macdonald	Democratic	1954	Incumbent re-elected.	✓ Torbert Macdonald (Democratic) 67.3%; Gordon F. Hughes (Republican) 32.7%
Massachusetts 8	Tip O'Neill	Democratic	1952	Incumbent re-elected.	✓ Tip O'Neill (Democratic); Unopposed
Massachusetts 9	John W. McCormack	Democratic	1928	Incumbent retired. Democratic hold.	✓ Louise Day Hicks (Democratic) 59.1%; Daniel J. Houton (Independent) 20.5%; Laurence Curtis (Republican) 20.4%
Massachusetts 10	Margaret Heckler	Republican	1966	Incumbent re-elected.	✓ Margaret Heckler (Republican) 57.0%; Bertram A. Yaffe (Democratic) 43.0%
Massachusetts 11	James A. Burke	Democratic	1958	Incumbent re-elected.	✓ James A. Burke (Democratic); Unopposed
Massachusetts 12	Hastings Keith	Republican	1958	Incumbent re-elected.	✓ Hastings Keith (Republican) 50.4%; Gerry Studds (Democratic) 49.6%

== Michigan ==
District	Incumbent			This race	
District	Member	Party	First elected	Results	Candidates
Michigan 1	John Conyers Jr.	Democratic	1964	Incumbent re-elected.	✓ John Conyers Jr. (Democratic) 88.2%; Howard L. Johnson (Republican) 11.2%; Jacqueline D. Rice (Socialist Workers) 0.6%
Michigan 2	Marvin L. Esch	Republican	1966	Incumbent re-elected.	✓ Marvin L. Esch (Republican) 62.5%; R. Michael Stillwagon (Democratic) 37.5%
Michigan 3	Garry E. Brown	Republican	1966	Incumbent re-elected.	✓ Garry E. Brown (Republican) 56.3%; Richard A. Enslen (Democratic) 43.7%
Michigan 4	J. Edward Hutchinson	Republican	1962	Incumbent re-elected.	✓ J. Edward Hutchinson (Republican) 61.9%; David R. McCormack (Democratic) 38.1%
Michigan 5	Gerald Ford	Republican	1948	Incumbent re-elected.	✓ Gerald Ford (Republican) 61.4%; Jean McKee (Democratic) 38.5%; Frank Girard (Socialist Labor) 0.08%; Walter M. Kus (Socialist Workers) 0.06%
Michigan 6	Charles E. Chamberlain	Republican	1956	Incumbent re-elected.	✓ Charles E. Chamberlain (Republican) 60.3%; John A. Cihon (Democratic) 39.7%
Michigan 7	Donald W. Riegle Jr.	Republican	1966	Incumbent re-elected.	✓ Donald W. Riegle Jr. (Republican) 69.2%; Richard J. Ruhala (Democratic) 29.2%; Eugene L. Mattison (American Independent) 1.6%
Michigan 8	R. James Harvey	Republican	1960	Incumbent re-elected.	✓ R. James Harvey (Republican) 65.9%; Richard E. Davies (Democratic) 34.1%
Michigan 9	Guy Vander Jagt	Republican	1966	Incumbent re-elected.	✓ Guy Vander Jagt (Republican) 64.4%; Charles Arthur Rogers (Democratic) 35.1%; Patrick V. Dillinger (American Independent) 0.6%
Michigan 10	Elford Albin Cederberg	Republican	1952	Incumbent re-elected.	✓ Elford Albin Cederberg (Republican) 59.1%; Gerald J. Parent (Democratic) 40.9%
Michigan 11	Philip Ruppe	Republican	1966	Incumbent re-elected.	✓ Philip Ruppe (Republican) 61.6%; Nino Green (Democratic) 38.4%
Michigan 12	James G. O'Hara	Democratic	1958	Incumbent re-elected.	✓ James G. O'Hara (Democratic) 76.1%; Patrick J. Driscoll (Republican) 22.9%; Milton E. Deschaine (American Independent) 0.9%
Michigan 13	Charles Diggs	Democratic	1954	Incumbent re-elected.	✓ Charles Diggs (Democratic) 86.2%; Fred W. Engel (Republican) 13.8%
Michigan 14	Lucien Nedzi	Democratic	1961 (Special)	Incumbent re-elected.	✓ Lucien Nedzi (Democratic) 70.0%; John L. Owen (Republican) 30.0%
Michigan 15	William D. Ford	Democratic	1964	Incumbent re-elected.	✓ William D. Ford (Democratic) 79.9%; Ernest C. Fackler (Republican) 20.1%
Michigan 16	John D. Dingell Jr.	Democratic	1955 (Special)	Incumbent re-elected.	✓ John D. Dingell Jr. (Democratic) 79.1%; William E. Rostron (Republican) 20.9%
Michigan 17	Martha W. Griffiths	Democratic	1954	Incumbent re-elected.	✓ Martha W. Griffiths (Democratic) 79.7%; Thomas E. Klunzinger (Republican) 20.3%
Michigan 18	William Broomfield	Republican	1956	Incumbent re-elected.	✓ William Broomfield (Republican) 64.6%; August Scholle (Democratic) 35.4%
Michigan 19	Jack H. McDonald	Republican	1966	Incumbent re-elected.	✓ Jack H. McDonald (Republican) 58.8%; Fred L. Harris (Democratic) 40.5%; Hector M. McGregor (American Independent) 0.6%

== Minnesota ==
District	Incumbent			This race	
District	Member	Party	First elected	Results	Candidates
Minnesota 1	Al Quie	Republican	1958	Incumbent re-elected.	✓ Al Quie (Republican) 69.3%; B. A. Lundeen (Democratic (DFL)) 30.7%
Minnesota 2	Ancher Nelsen	Republican	1958	Incumbent re-elected.	✓ Ancher Nelsen (Republican) 63.3%; Clifford R. Adams (Democratic (DFL)) 36.7%
Minnesota 3	Clark MacGregor	Republican	1960	Incumbent retired to run for U.S. senator. Republican hold.	✓ Bill Frenzel (Republican) 50.6%; George Rice (Democratic (DFL)) 49.4%
Minnesota 4	Joseph Karth	Democratic (DFL)	1958	Incumbent re-elected.	✓ Joseph Karth (Democratic (DFL)) 74.2%; Frank L. Loss (Republican) 25.8%
Minnesota 5	Donald M. Fraser	Democratic (DFL)	1962	Incumbent re-elected.	✓ Donald M. Fraser (Democratic (DFL)) 57.1%; Dick Enroth (Republican) 42.3%; Derrell Myers (Socialist Workers) 0.5%
Minnesota 6	John M. Zwach	Republican	1966	Incumbent re-elected.	✓ John M. Zwach (Republican) 51.8%; Terry Montgomery (Democratic (DFL)) 47.3%; Richard Martin (Independent) 0.9%
Minnesota 7	Odin Langen	Republican	1958	Incumbent lost re-election. Democratic (DFL) gain.	✓ Robert Bergland (Democratic (DFL)) 54.1%; Odin Langen (Republican) 45.9%
Minnesota 8	John Blatnik	Democratic (DFL)	1946	Incumbent re-elected.	✓ John Blatnik (Democratic (DFL)) 78.0%; Paul Reed (Republican) 22.0%

== Mississippi ==
District	Incumbent			This race	
District	Member	Party	First elected	Results	Candidates
Mississippi 1	Thomas Abernethy	Democratic	1942	Incumbent re-elected.	✓ Thomas Abernethy (Democratic); Unopposed
Mississippi 2	Jamie Whitten	Democratic	1941 (Special)	Incumbent re-elected.	✓ Jamie Whitten (Democratic) 86.5%; Eugene Carter (Independent) 13.5%
Mississippi 3	Charles H. Griffin	Democratic	1968	Incumbent re-elected.	✓ Charles H. Griffin (Democratic) 63.7%; Ray Lee (Republican) 36.3%
Mississippi 4	Sonny Montgomery	Democratic	1966	Incumbent re-elected.	✓ Sonny Montgomery (Democratic); Unopposed
Mississippi 5	William M. Colmer	Democratic	1932	Incumbent re-elected.	✓ William M. Colmer (Democratic) 90.4%; Earnest J. Creel (Independent) 9.6%

== Missouri ==
District	Incumbent			This race	
District	Member	Party	First elected	Results	Candidates
Missouri 1	Bill Clay	Democratic	1968	Incumbent re-elected.	✓ Bill Clay (Democratic) 90.5%; Gerald G. Fischer (American Independent) 9.5%
Missouri 2	James W. Symington	Democratic	1968	Incumbent re-elected.	✓ James W. Symington (Democratic) 57.6%; Philip R. Hoffman (Republican) 41.1%; Sterling E. Lacy (American Independent) 1.4%
Missouri 3	Leonor Sullivan	Democratic	1952	Incumbent re-elected.	✓ Leonor Sullivan (Democratic) 74.8%; Dale F. Troske (Republican) 25.2%
Missouri 4	William J. Randall	Democratic	1959 (Special)	Incumbent re-elected.	✓ William J. Randall (Democratic) 60.1%; Leslie O. Olson (Republican) 39.9%
Missouri 5	Richard Walker Bolling	Democratic	1948	Incumbent re-elected.	✓ Richard Walker Bolling (Democratic) 61.3%; Randall Vanet (Republican) 37.8%; Jim E. Kernodle (American Independent) 0.9%
Missouri 6	William Raleigh Hull Jr.	Democratic	1954	Incumbent re-elected.	✓ William Raleigh Hull Jr. (Democratic) 53.6%; Hugh A. Sprague (Republican) 45.9%; O. B. Chaney (American Independent) 0.5%
Missouri 7	Durward Gorham Hall	Republican	1960	Incumbent re-elected.	✓ Durward Gorham Hall (Republican); Unopposed
Missouri 8	Richard Howard Ichord Jr.	Democratic	1960	Incumbent re-elected.	✓ Richard Howard Ichord Jr. (Democratic) 64.3%; John L. Caskanett (Republican) 35.1%; Charles H. Byford (American Independent) 0.6%
Missouri 9	William L. Hungate	Democratic	1964	Incumbent re-elected.	✓ William L. Hungate (Democratic) 63.0%; Anthony C. Schroeder (Republican) 36.2%; Orville C. Hale (American Independent) 0.7%
Missouri 10	Bill Burlison	Democratic	1968	Incumbent re-elected.	✓ Bill Burlison (Democratic) 56.0%; Gary Rust (Republican) 44.0%

== Montana ==
District	Incumbent			This race	
District	Member	Party	First elected	Results	Candidates
Montana 1	Arnold Olsen	Democratic	1960	Incumbent lost re-election. Republican gain.	✓ Richard G. Shoup (Republican) 50.5%; Arnold Olsen (Democratic) 49.5%
Montana 2	John Melcher	Democratic	1969 (Special)	Incumbent re-elected.	✓ John Melcher (Democratic) 64.1%; Jack Rehberg (Republican) 35.9%

== Nebraska ==
District	Incumbent			This race	
District	Member	Party	First elected	Results	Candidates
Nebraska 1	Robert Vernon Denney	Republican	1966	Incumbent retired. Republican hold.	✓ Charles Thone (Republican) 50.6%; Clair Armstrong Callan (Independent) 26.2%; George Bill Burrows (Democratic) 23.2%
Nebraska 2	Glenn Cunningham	Republican	1956	Incumbent lost renomination. Republican hold.	✓ John Y. McCollister (Republican) 51.9%; John Hlavacek (Democratic) 48.1%
Nebraska 3	David Martin	Republican	1960	Incumbent re-elected.	✓ David Martin (Republican) 59.5%; Donald Searcy (Democratic) 40.5%

== Nevada ==
District	Incumbent			This race	
District	Member	Party	First elected	Results	Candidates
Nevada at-large	Walter S. Baring Jr.	Democratic	1948; 1952 (defeated); 1956	Incumbent re-elected.	✓ Walter S. Baring Jr. (Democratic) 82.5%; J. Robert Charles (Republican) 17.5%

== New Hampshire ==
District	Incumbent			This race	
District	Member	Party	First elected	Results	Candidates
New Hampshire 1	Louis C. Wyman	Republican	1962; 1964 (defeated); 1966	Incumbent re-elected.	✓ Louis C. Wyman (Republican) 67.4%; Chester Earl Merrow (Democratic) 32.6%
New Hampshire 2	James Colgate Cleveland	Republican	1962	Incumbent re-elected.	✓ James Colgate Cleveland (Republican) 69.6%; Eugene S. Daniell Jr. (Democratic) 30.4%

== New Jersey ==
District	Incumbent			This race	
District	Member	Party	First elected	Results	Candidates
New Jersey 1	John E. Hunt	Republican	1966	Incumbent re-elected.	✓ John E. Hunt (Republican) 61.2%; Salvatore T. Mansi (Democratic) 38.4%; Dominic W. Doganiero (Socialist Labor) 0.3%
New Jersey 2	Charles W. Sandman Jr.	Republican	1966	Incumbent re-elected.	✓ Charles W. Sandman Jr. (Republican) 51.7%; William J. Hughes (Democratic) 48.3%
New Jersey 3	James J. Howard	Democratic	1964	Incumbent re-elected.	✓ James J. Howard (Democratic) 55.2%; William F. Dowd (Republican) 43.1%; Clyde W. Hill (Conservative) 1.8%
New Jersey 4	Frank Thompson	Democratic	1954	Incumbent re-elected.	✓ Frank Thompson (Democratic) 58.4%; Edward A. Costigan (Republican) 41.4%; Joseph J. Frank (Socialist Labor) 0.3%
New Jersey 5	Peter Frelinghuysen Jr.	Republican	1952	Incumbent re-elected.	✓ Peter Frelinghuysen Jr. (Republican) 66.4%; Robert C. Eisele (Democratic) 31.8%; Robert G. Wright (Conservative) 1.8%
New Jersey 6	William T. Cahill	Republican	1958	Resigned when elected Governor of New Jersey. Republican hold.	✓ Edwin B. Forsythe (Republican) 54.8%; Charles B. Yates (Democratic) 45.2%
New Jersey 7	William B. Widnall	Republican	1950	Incumbent re-elected.	✓ William B. Widnall (Republican) 58.6%; Arthur J. Lesemann (Democratic) 41.4%
New Jersey 8	Charles Samuel Joelson	Democratic	1960	Resigned when appointed judge Democratic hold.	✓ Robert A. Roe (Democratic) 61.0%; Alfred E. Fontanella (Republican) 39.0%
New Jersey 9	Henry Helstoski	Democratic	1964	Incumbent re-elected.	✓ Henry Helstoski (Democratic) 56.6%; Henry L. Hoebel (Republican) 42.6%; Hannibal Cundari (Conservative) 0.8%
New Jersey 10	Peter W. Rodino	Democratic	1948	Incumbent re-elected.	✓ Peter W. Rodino (Democratic) 70.0%; Griffith H. Jones (Republican) 30.0%
New Jersey 11	Joseph Minish	Democratic	1962	Incumbent re-elected.	✓ Joseph Minish (Democratic) 68.5%; James W. Shue (Republican) 31.5%
New Jersey 12	Florence P. Dwyer	Republican	1956	Incumbent re-elected.	✓ Florence P. Dwyer (Republican) 66.2%; Daniel F. Lundy (Democratic) 33.8%
New Jersey 13	Cornelius Gallagher	Democratic	1958	Incumbent re-elected.	✓ Cornelius Gallagher (Democratic) 71.1%; Raúl E. L. Comesañas (Republican) 25.5%; Everett C. Miller (Tax Reform) 3.4%
New Jersey 14	Dominick V. Daniels	Democratic	1958	Incumbent re-elected.	✓ Dominick V. Daniels (Democratic) 69.7%; Carlo N. DeGennaro (Republican) 27.9%; Martha R. Whaley (Conservative) 1.6%; Vincent J. Dellay (Independent) 0.7%
New Jersey 15	Edward J. Patten	Democratic	1962	Incumbent re-elected.	✓ Edward J. Patten (Democratic) 61.1%; Peter P. Garibaldi (Republican) 38.9%

== New Mexico ==
District	Incumbent			This race	
District	Member	Party	First elected	Results	Candidates
New Mexico 1	Manuel Lujan Jr.	Republican	1968	Incumbent re-elected.	✓ Manuel Lujan Jr. (Republican) 58.5%; Fabian Chavez Jr. (Democratic) 41.5%
New Mexico 2	Ed Foreman	Republican	1962; 1964 (defeated); 1968	Incumbent lost re-election. Democratic gain.	✓ Harold L. Runnels (Democratic) 51.4%; Ed Foreman (Republican) 48.6%

== New York ==
District	Incumbent			This race	
District	Member	Party	First elected	Results	Candidates
New York 1	Otis G. Pike	Democratic	1960	Incumbent re-elected.	✓ Otis G. Pike (Democratic) 52.2%; Malcolm E. Smith Jr. (Republican) 47.8%
New York 2	James R. Grover Jr.	Republican	1962	Incumbent re-elected.	✓ James R. Grover Jr. (Republican) 66.1%; Harvey W. Sherman (Democratic) 33.9%
New York 3	Lester L. Wolff	Democratic	1964	Incumbent re-elected.	✓ Lester L. Wolff (Democratic) 54.4%; Raymond J. Rice (Republican) 38.1%; Lola Camardi (Conservative) 7.4%
New York 4	John W. Wydler	Republican	1962	Incumbent re-elected.	✓ John W. Wydler (Republican) 57.0%; Karen S. Burstein (Democratic) 35.1%; Donald A. Derham (Conservative) 7.9%
New York 5	Allard K. Lowenstein	Democratic	1968	Incumbent lost re-election. Republican gain.	✓ Norman F. Lent (Republican) 51.0%; Allard K. Lowenstein (Democratic) 46.1%; Vincent J. Carey (Right to Life) 2.9%
New York 6	Seymour Halpern	Republican	1958	Incumbent re-elected.	✓ Seymour Halpern (Republican) 77.3%; John J. Flynn (Conservative) 22.7%
New York 7	Joseph P. Addabbo	Democratic	1960	Incumbent re-elected.	✓ Joseph P. Addabbo (Democratic) 90.8%; Christopher T. Acer (Conservative) 9.2%
New York 8	Benjamin Stanley Rosenthal	Democratic	1962	Incumbent re-elected.	✓ Benjamin Stanley Rosenthal (Democratic) 62.8%; Cosmo J. DiTucci (Republican) 37.2%
New York 9	James J. Delaney	Democratic	1944; 1946 (defeated); 1948	Incumbent re-elected.	✓ James J. Delaney (Democratic) 91.9%; Rose L. Rubin (Liberal) 8.1%
New York 10	Emanuel Celler	Democratic	1922	Incumbent re-elected.	✓ Emanuel Celler (Democratic) 73.0%; Frank J. Occhiogrosso (Republican) 27.0%
New York 11	Frank J. Brasco	Democratic	1966	Incumbent re-elected.	✓ Frank J. Brasco (Democratic) 78.6%; William Sampol (Conservative) 12.2%; Paul Meyrowitz (Liberal) 9.2%
New York 12	Shirley Chisholm	Democratic	1968	Incumbent re-elected.	✓ Shirley Chisholm (Democratic) 81.8%; John Coleman (Republican) 15.1%; Martin S. Shepherd Jr. (Conservative) 3.1%
New York 13	Bertram L. Podell	Democratic	1968	Incumbent re-elected.	✓ Bertram L. Podell (Democratic) 77.0%; George W. McKenzie (Republican) 15.5%; Herbert Dicker (Liberal) 7.5%
New York 14	John J. Rooney	Democratic	1944	Incumbent re-elected.	✓ John J. Rooney (Democratic) 55.2%; John F. Jacobs (Republican) 26.6%; Peter E. Eikenberry (Liberal) 18.3%
New York 15	Hugh Carey	Democratic	1960	Incumbent re-elected.	✓ Hugh Carey (Democratic) 64.7%; Frank C. Spinner (Republican) 22.8%; Stephen P. Marion (Conservative) 6.8%; Carl Saks (Liberal) 5.7%
New York 16	John M. Murphy	Democratic	1962	Incumbent re-elected.	✓ John M. Murphy (Democratic) 51.6%; David D. Smith (Republican) 45.2%; George D. McClain (Liberal) 3.2%
New York 17	Ed Koch	Democratic	1968	Incumbent re-elected.	✓ Ed Koch (Democratic) 62.0%; Peter J. Sprague (Republican) 31.9%; Richard J. Callahan (Conservative) 6.0%
New York 18	Adam Clayton Powell Jr.	Democratic	1944	Incumbent lost renomination. Democratic hold.	✓ Charles B. Rangel (Democratic) 86.8%; Charles Taylor (Liberal) 10.5%; Bohdan J. Wasiutynski (Conservative) 1.7%; Jose Stevens (C) 0.6%; Paul B. Boutelle (Socialist Workers) 0.4%
New York 19	Leonard Farbstein	Democratic	1956	Incumbent lost renomination. Democratic hold.	✓ Bella Abzug (Democratic) 52.3%; Barry Farber (Republican) 42.8%; Salvatore Lodico (Conservative) 4.9%
New York 20	William Fitts Ryan	Democratic	1960	Incumbent re-elected.	✓ William Fitts Ryan (Democratic) 78.8%; William Goldstein (Republican) 14.4%; Francis C. Saunders (Conservative) 6.7%
New York 21	None (District created)			New seat Democratic gain.	✓ Herman Badillo (Democratic) 83.7%; George B. Smaragdas (Conservative) 16.3%
New York 22	Jacob H. Gilbert	Democratic	1960	Lost renomination in a redistricting contest. Democratic loss.	✓ James H. Scheuer (Democratic) 71.6%; Robert M. Schneck (Republican) 28.4%
New York 22	James H. Scheuer; Redistricted from 21st district	Democratic	1964	Incumbent re-elected.	✓ James H. Scheuer (Democratic) 71.6%; Robert M. Schneck (Republican) 28.4%
New York 23	Jonathan Brewster Bingham	Democratic	1964	Incumbent re-elected.	✓ Jonathan Brewster Bingham (Democratic) 76.2%; George E. Sweeney (Republican) 15.6%; Nora M. Kardian (Conservative) 8.2%
New York 24	Mario Biaggi	Democratic	1968	Incumbent re-elected.	✓ Mario Biaggi (Democratic) 69.9%; Joseph F. Periconi (Republican) 24.9%; John P. Hagan (Liberal) 5.2%
New York 25	Richard Ottinger	Democratic	1964	Incumbent retired to run for U.S. senator. Republican gain.	✓ Peter A. Peyser (Republican) 42.5%; William Dretzin (Democratic) 37.0%; Anthony J. DeVito (Conservative) 17.3%; William S. Greenawalt (Liberal) 3.2%
New York 26	Ogden R. Reid	Republican	1962	Incumbent re-elected.	✓ Ogden R. Reid (Republican) 66.4%; Michael A. Coffey (Conservative) 18.0%; G. Russell James (Democratic) 15.7%
New York 27	Martin B. McKneally	Republican	1968	Incumbent lost re-election. Democratic gain.	✓ John G. Dow (Democratic) 52.2%; Martin B. McKneally (Republican) 47.8%
New York 28	Hamilton Fish IV	Republican	1968	Incumbent re-elected.	✓ Hamilton Fish IV (Republican) 70.8%; John J. Greaney (Democratic) 24.7%; Harry S. Hoffman Jr. (Conservative) 4.5%
New York 29	Daniel E. Button	Republican	1966	Lost re-election in a redistricting contest. Republican loss.	✓ Samuel S. Stratton (Democratic) 66.2%; Daniel E. Button (Republican) 33.8%
New York 29	Samuel S. Stratton; Redistricted from 35th district	Democratic	1958	Incumbent re-elected.	✓ Samuel S. Stratton (Democratic) 66.2%; Daniel E. Button (Republican) 33.8%
New York 30	Carleton J. King	Republican	1960	Incumbent re-elected.	✓ Carleton J. King (Republican) 57.1%; Edward W. Pattison (Democratic) 42.9%
New York 31	Robert C. McEwen	Republican	1964	Incumbent re-elected.	✓ Robert C. McEwen (Republican) 72.4%; Erwin L. Bornstein (Democratic) 27.6%
New York 32	Alexander Pirnie	Republican	1958	Incumbent re-elected.	✓ Alexander Pirnie (Republican) 65.8%; Joseph Simmons (Democratic) 34.2%
New York 33	Howard W. Robison	Republican	1958	Incumbent re-elected.	✓ Howard W. Robison (Republican) 66.5%; David Bernstein (Democratic) 33.5%
New York 34	None (District created)			New seat Republican gain.	✓ John H. Terry (Republican) 59.5%; Neal P. McCurn (Democratic) 40.5%
New York 35	James M. Hanley; Redistricted from 34th district	Democratic	1964	Incumbent re-elected.	✓ James M. Hanley (Democratic) 51.9%; John F. O'Connor (Republican) 48.1%
New York 36	Frank Horton	Republican	1962	Incumbent re-elected.	✓ Frank Horton (Republican) 70.5%; Jordan E. Pappas (Democratic) 22.3%; David F. Hampson (Conservative) 6.0%; Morley Schloss (Liberal) 1.2%
New York 37	Barber Conable	Republican	1964	Incumbent re-elected.	✓ Barber Conable (Republican) 65.9%; Richard N. Anderson (Democratic) 29.4%; Keith R. Wallis (Conservative) 4.7%
New York 38	James F. Hastings	Republican	1968	Incumbent re-elected.	✓ James F. Hastings (Republican) 71.4%; James G. Cretekos (Democratic) 28.6%
New York 39	Richard D. McCarthy	Democratic	1964	Incumbent retired to run for U.S. senator. Republican gain.	✓ Jack Kemp (Republican) 51.6%; Thomas P. Flaherty (Democratic) 48.4%
New York 40	Henry P. Smith III	Republican	1964	Incumbent re-elected.	✓ Henry P. Smith III (Republican) 63.4%; Edward Cuddy (Democratic) 36.6%
New York 41	Thaddeus J. Dulski	Democratic	1958	Incumbent re-elected.	✓ Thaddeus J. Dulski (Democratic) 79.7%; William M. Johns (Republican) 20.3%

== North Carolina ==
District	Incumbent			This race	
District	Member	Party	First elected	Results	Candidates
North Carolina 1	Walter B. Jones Sr.	Democratic	1966	Incumbent re-elected.	✓ Walter B. Jones Sr. (Democratic) 70.2%; R. Frank Everett (Republican) 27.3%; Gene Leggett (American Independent) 2.4%
North Carolina 2	Lawrence H. Fountain	Democratic	1952	Incumbent re-elected.	✓ Lawrence H. Fountain (Democratic); Unopposed
North Carolina 3	David N. Henderson	Democratic	1960	Incumbent re-elected.	✓ David N. Henderson (Democratic) 60.1%; Herbert H. Howell (Republican) 39.9%
North Carolina 4	Nick Galifianakis	Democratic	1966	Incumbent re-elected.	✓ Nick Galifianakis (Democratic) 52.4%; Jack Hawke (Republican) 47.6%
North Carolina 5	Wilmer Mizell	Republican	1968	Incumbent re-elected.	✓ Wilmer Mizell (Republican) 58.1%; James G. White (Democratic) 41.9%
North Carolina 6	L. Richardson Preyer	Democratic	1968	Incumbent re-elected.	✓ L. Richardson Preyer (Democratic) 66.0%; Clifton B. Barham Jr. (Republican) 28.7%; Lynwood Bullock (American Independent) 5.3%
North Carolina 7	Alton Lennon	Democratic	1956	Incumbent re-elected.	✓ Alton Lennon (Democratic) 72.0%; Frederick R. Weber (Republican) 28.0%
North Carolina 8	Earl B. Ruth	Republican	1968	Incumbent re-elected.	✓ Earl B. Ruth (Republican) 56.1%; H. Clifton Blue (Democratic) 43.9%
North Carolina 9	Charles R. Jonas	Republican	1952	Incumbent re-elected.	✓ Charles R. Jonas (Republican) 66.6%; Cy N. Bahakel (Democratic) 33.4%
North Carolina 10	Jim Broyhill	Republican	1962	Incumbent re-elected.	✓ Jim Broyhill (Republican) 57.1%; Basil Lee Whitener (Democratic) 42.9%
North Carolina 11	Roy A. Taylor	Democratic	1960	Incumbent re-elected.	✓ Roy A. Taylor (Democratic) 67.0%; Luke Atkinson (Republican) 33.0%

== North Dakota ==
District	Incumbent			This race	
District	Member	Party	First elected	Results	Candidates
North Dakota 1	Mark Andrews	Republican	1963 (Special)	Incumbent re-elected.	✓ Mark Andrews (Republican) 65.7%; James E. Brooks (Democratic) 34.3%
North Dakota 2	Thomas S. Kleppe	Republican	1966	Incumbent retired to run for U.S. senator. Democratic gain.	✓ Arthur A. Link (Democratic) 50.3%; Robert McCarney (Republican) 49.7%

== Ohio ==
District	Incumbent			This race	
District	Member	Party	First elected	Results	Candidates
Ohio 1	Robert Taft Jr.	Republican	1962; 1964 (retired); 1966	Incumbent retired to run for U.S. senator. Republican hold.	✓ William J. Keating (Republican) 69.1%; Bailey W. Turner (Democratic) 30.9%
Ohio 2	Donald D. Clancy	Republican	1960	Incumbent re-elected.	✓ Donald D. Clancy (Republican) 55.9%; Jerry Springer (Democratic) 44.1%
Ohio 3	Charles W. Whalen Jr.	Republican	1966	Incumbent re-elected.	✓ Charles W. Whalen Jr. (Republican) 74.2%; Dempsey A. Kerr (Democratic) 22.8%; Russell G. Butcke (American Independent) 3.0%
Ohio 4	William Moore McCulloch	Republican	1947 (Special)	Incumbent re-elected.	✓ William Moore McCulloch (Republican) 64.4%; Donald B. Laws (Democratic) 35.6%
Ohio 5	Del Latta	Republican	1958	Incumbent re-elected.	✓ Del Latta (Republican) 71.1%; Carl G. Sherer (Democratic) 28.9%
Ohio 6	Bill Harsha	Republican	1960	Incumbent re-elected.	✓ Bill Harsha (Republican) 67.8%; Raymond H. Stevens (Democratic) 32.2%
Ohio 7	Bud Brown	Republican	1965 (Special)	Incumbent re-elected.	✓ Bud Brown (Republican) 69.4%; Joseph D. Lewis (Democratic) 30.6%
Ohio 8	Jackson Edward Betts	Republican	1950	Incumbent re-elected.	✓ Jackson Edward Betts (Republican); Unopposed
Ohio 9	Thomas L. Ashley	Democratic	1954	Incumbent re-elected.	✓ Thomas L. Ashley (Democratic) 70.9%; Allen H. Shapiro (Republican) 29.1%
Ohio 10	Clarence E. Miller	Republican	1966	Incumbent re-elected.	✓ Clarence E. Miller (Republican) 66.5%; Doug Arnett (Democratic) 33.5%
Ohio 11	J. William Stanton	Republican	1964	Incumbent re-elected.	✓ J. William Stanton (Republican) 68.2%; Ralph Rudd (Democratic) 31.8%
Ohio 12	Samuel L. Devine	Republican	1958	Incumbent re-elected.	✓ Samuel L. Devine (Republican) 57.7%; James W. Goodrich (Democratic) 42.3%
Ohio 13	Charles Adams Mosher	Republican	1960	Incumbent re-elected.	✓ Charles Adams Mosher (Republican) 61.7%; Joseph J. Bartolomeo (Democratic) 38.3%
Ohio 14	William Hanes Ayres	Republican	1950	Incumbent lost re-election. Democratic gain.	✓ John F. Seiberling (Democratic) 56.4%; William Hanes Ayres (Republican) 43.6%
Ohio 15	Chalmers Wylie	Republican	1966	Incumbent re-elected.	✓ Chalmers Wylie (Republican) 70.6%; Manley L. McGee (Republican) 29.4%
Ohio 16	Frank T. Bow	Republican	1950	Incumbent re-elected.	✓ Frank T. Bow (Republican) 56.2%; Virgil L. Musser (Democratic) 43.8%
Ohio 17	John M. Ashbrook	Republican	1960	Incumbent re-elected.	✓ John M. Ashbrook (Republican) 62.2%; James C. Hood (Democratic) 34.5%; Clifford J. Simpson (American Independent) 3.3%
Ohio 18	Wayne Hays	Democratic	1948	Incumbent re-elected.	✓ Wayne Hays (Democratic) 68.3%; Robert Stewart (Republican) 31.7%
Ohio 19	Michael J. Kirwan	Democratic	1936	Incumbent died. Democratic hold.	✓ Charles J. Carney (Democratic) 58.4%; Margaret Dennison (Republican) 41.6%
Ohio 20	Michael A. Feighan	Democratic	1942	Incumbent lost renomination. Democratic hold.	✓ James V. Stanton (Democratic) 81.3%; J. William Petro (Republican) 18.7%
Ohio 21	Louis Stokes	Democratic	1968	Incumbent re-elected.	✓ Louis Stokes (Democratic) 77.6%; Bill Mack (Republican) 22.4%
Ohio 22	Charles Vanik	Democratic	1954	Incumbent re-elected.	✓ Charles Vanik (Democratic) 71.5%; Adrian Fink (Republican) 28.5%
Ohio 23	William Edwin Minshall Jr.	Republican	1954	Incumbent re-elected.	✓ William Edwin Minshall Jr. (Republican) 60.1%; Ronald M. Mottl (Democratic) 39.9%
Ohio 24	Donald "Buz" Lukens	Republican	1966	Incumbent retired to run for Governor of Ohio. Republican hold.	✓ Walter E. Powell (Republican) 51.5%; James D. Ruppert (Democratic) 45.1%; Joseph F. Payton (American Independent) 3.4%

== Oklahoma ==
District	Incumbent			This race	
District	Member	Party	First elected	Results	Candidates
Oklahoma 1	Page Belcher	Republican	1950	Incumbent re-elected.	✓ Page Belcher (Republican) 55.7%; James R. Jones (Democratic) 44.3%
Oklahoma 2	Ed Edmondson	Democratic	1952	Incumbent re-elected.	✓ Ed Edmondson (Democratic) 70.8%; Gene Humphries (Republican) 29.2%
Oklahoma 3	Carl Albert	Democratic	1946	Incumbent re-elected.	✓ Carl Albert (Democratic); Unopposed
Oklahoma 4	Tom Steed	Democratic	1948	Incumbent re-elected.	✓ Tom Steed (Democratic) 63.7%; Jay Wilkinson (Republican) 34.9%; Mary H. Rawls (American Independent) 0.9%; Kenneth A. Kottka (Independent) 0.5%
Oklahoma 5	John Jarman	Democratic	1950	Incumbent re-elected.	✓ John Jarman (Democratic) 73.1%; Terry L. Campbell (Republican) 26.9%
Oklahoma 6	John Newbold Camp	Republican	1968	Incumbent re-elected.	✓ John Newbold Camp (Republican) 64.2%; R. O. Joe Cassity Jr. (Democratic) 35.8%

== Oregon ==
District	Incumbent			This race	
District	Member	Party	First elected	Results	Candidates
Oregon 1	Wendell Wyatt	Republican	1964	Incumbent re-elected.	✓ Wendell Wyatt (Republican) 71.8%; Vern Cook (Democratic) 28.2%
Oregon 2	Al Ullman	Democratic	1956	Incumbent re-elected.	✓ Al Ullman (Democratic) 71.3%; Everett Thoren (Republican) 28.7%
Oregon 3	Edith Green	Democratic	1954	Incumbent re-elected.	✓ Edith Green (Democratic) 73.7%; Robert E. Dugdale (Republican) 26.3%
Oregon 4	John R. Dellenback	Republican	1966	Incumbent re-elected.	✓ John R. Dellenback (Republican) 58.3%; Jim Weaver (Democratic) 41.7%

== Pennsylvania ==
District	Incumbent			This race	
District	Member	Party	First elected	Results	Candidates
Pennsylvania 1	William A. Barrett	Democratic	1944; 1946 (defeated); 1948	Incumbent re-elected.	✓ William A. Barrett (Democratic) 69.2%; Joseph S. Ziccardi (Republican) 30.2%; Paul K. Botts (American Independent) 0.6%
Pennsylvania 2	Robert N. C. Nix Sr.	Democratic	1958	Incumbent re-elected.	✓ Robert N. C. Nix Sr. (Democratic) 68.2%; Edward L. Taylor (Republican) 31.8%
Pennsylvania 3	James A. Byrne	Democratic	1952	Incumbent re-elected.	✓ James A. Byrne (Democratic) 56.4%; Gustine K. Pelagatti (Republican) 43.6%
Pennsylvania 4	Joshua Eilberg	Democratic	1966	Incumbent re-elected.	✓ Joshua Eilberg (Democratic) 59.4%; Charles F. Dougherty (Republican) 40.6%
Pennsylvania 5	William J. Green III	Democratic	1964	Incumbent re-elected.	✓ William J. Green III (Democratic) 66.9%; James H. Ring (Republican) 32.5%; John D. Donahue (American Independent) 0.6%
Pennsylvania 6	Gus Yatron	Democratic	1968	Incumbent re-elected.	✓ Gus Yatron (Democratic) 65.0%; Michael Kitsock (Republican) 32.6%; George T. Atkins (Constitution) 2.3%
Pennsylvania 7	Lawrence G. Williams	Republican	1966	Incumbent re-elected.	✓ Lawrence G. Williams (Republican) 59.2%; Joseph R. Breslin (Democratic) 40.8%
Pennsylvania 8	Edward G. Biester Jr.	Republican	1966	Incumbent re-elected.	✓ Edward G. Biester Jr. (Republican) 56.3%; Arthur Leo Hennessy Jr. (Democratic) 39.7%; Charles B. Moore (Constitution) 3.9%
Pennsylvania 9	George Watkins	Republican	1964	Incumbent died. Republican hold.	✓ John H. Ware III (Republican) 59.2%; Louis F. Waldmann (Democratic) 40.8%
Pennsylvania 10	Joseph M. McDade	Republican	1962	Incumbent re-elected.	✓ Joseph M. McDade (Republican) 65.4%; Edward J. Smith (Democratic) 32.8%; Stephen P. Depue (Constitution) 1.7%
Pennsylvania 11	Dan Flood	Democratic	1944; 1946 (defeated); 1948; 1952 (defeated); 1954	Incumbent re-elected.	✓ Dan Flood (Democratic) 96.6%; Alvin J. Balschi (Constitution) 3.4%
Pennsylvania 12	J. Irving Whalley	Republican	1960	Incumbent re-elected.	✓ J. Irving Whalley (Republican) 64.0%; Victor J. Karycki Jr. (Democratic) 33.4%; Ken W. Ferry (American Independent) 1.3%; Lloyd G. Cope (Constitution) 1.3%
Pennsylvania 13	Lawrence Coughlin	Republican	1968	Incumbent re-elected.	✓ Lawrence Coughlin (Republican) 58.3%; Frank R. Romano (Democratic) 39.3%; John S. Matthews (Constitution) 1.9%; Anthony S. DeMeno (American Independent) 0.4%
Pennsylvania 14	William S. Moorhead	Democratic	1958	Incumbent re-elected.	✓ William S. Moorhead (Democratic) 76.5%; Barry Levine (Republican) 22.8%; Reuben Chaitin (American Independent) 0.7%
Pennsylvania 15	Fred B. Rooney	Democratic	1963 (Special)	Incumbent re-elected.	✓ Fred B. Rooney (Democratic) 66.9%; Charles H. Roberts (Republican) 31.6%; Chester R. Litz (Constitution) 1.5%
Pennsylvania 16	Edwin Duing Eshleman	Republican	1966	Incumbent re-elected.	✓ Edwin Duing Eshleman (Republican) 66.5%; John E. Pflum (Democratic) 30.5%; Walter B. Willard III (Constitution) 3.0%
Pennsylvania 17	Herman T. Schneebeli	Republican	1960	Incumbent re-elected.	✓ Herman T. Schneebeli (Republican) 57.9%; William P. Zurick (Democratic) 39.9%; Robert C. Weber (Constitution) 2.2%
Pennsylvania 18	Robert J. Corbett	Republican	1938; 1940 (defeated); 1944	Incumbent re-elected.	✓ Robert J. Corbett (Republican) 60.2%; Ronald E. Leslie (Democratic) 37.7%; John E. Backman (Constitution) 2.1%
Pennsylvania 19	George Atlee Goodling	Republican	1960; 1964 (defeated); 1966	Incumbent re-elected.	✓ George Atlee Goodling (Republican) 53.9%; Arthur L. Berger (Democratic) 44.0%; Joseph Paul (Constitution) 2.0%
Pennsylvania 20	Joseph M. Gaydos	Democratic	1968	Incumbent re-elected.	✓ Joseph M. Gaydos (Democratic) 77.0%; Joseph Honeygosky (Republican) 20.4%; Allan Staub (Constitution) 2.6%
Pennsylvania 21	John Herman Dent	Democratic	1958	Incumbent re-elected.	✓ John Herman Dent (Democratic) 68.5%; Glenn G. Anderson (Republican) 29.7%; Lloyd G. Cope (Constitution) 1.8%
Pennsylvania 22	John P. Saylor	Republican	1949 (Special)	Incumbent re-elected.	✓ John P. Saylor (Republican) 57.7%; Joseph F. O'Kicki (Democratic) 41.5%; Ellsworth L. Hahn (American Independent) 0.9%
Pennsylvania 23	Albert W. Johnson	Republican	1963 (Special)	Incumbent re-elected.	✓ Albert W. Johnson (Republican) 57.9%; Cecil R. Harrington (Democratic) 42.1%
Pennsylvania 24	Joseph P. Vigorito	Democratic	1964	Incumbent re-elected.	✓ Joseph P. Vigorito (Democratic) 66.8%; Wayne R. Merrick (Republican) 31.5%; Robert Shilling (Constitution) 1.7%
Pennsylvania 25	Frank M. Clark	Democratic	1954	Incumbent re-elected.	✓ Frank M. Clark (Democratic) 69.7%; John Loth (Republican) 28.1%; Albert H. Thornton (Constitution) 2.2%
Pennsylvania 26	Thomas E. Morgan	Democratic	1944	Incumbent re-elected.	✓ Thomas E. Morgan (Democratic) 68.4%; Dominick A. Capelli (Republican) 29.7%; Bernard M. Daecheck (Constitution) 1.8%
Pennsylvania 27	James G. Fulton	Republican	1944	Incumbent re-elected.	✓ James G. Fulton (Republican) 60.5%; Doug Walgren (Democratic) 38.3%; Harvey F. Johnston (American Independent) 1.1%

== Rhode Island ==
District	Incumbent			This race	
District	Member	Party	First elected	Results	Candidates
Rhode Island 1	Fernand St. Germain	Democratic	1960	Incumbent re-elected.	✓ Fernand St. Germain (Democratic) 60.9%; Walter J. Miska (Republican) 37.4%; Stephen Bruce Murray (Peace and Freedom) 1.6%
Rhode Island 2	Robert Tiernan	Democratic	1967 (Special)	Incumbent re-elected.	✓ Robert Tiernan (Democratic) 66.1%; William A. Dimitri Jr. (Republican) 33.6%; Louis Dona G. O'Hara (Independent) 0.3%

== South Carolina ==
District	Incumbent			This race	
District	Member	Party	First elected	Results	Candidates
South Carolina 1	L. Mendel Rivers	Democratic	1940	Incumbent re-elected.	✓ L. Mendel Rivers (Democratic); Unopposed
South Carolina 2	Albert Watson	Republican	1962	Incumbent retired to run for Governor of South Carolina. Republican hold.	✓ Floyd Spence (Republican) 53.1%; Heyward McDonald (Democratic) 46.4%; Donald R. Cole (Independent) 0.5%
South Carolina 3	William Jennings Bryan Dorn	Democratic	1946; 1948 (retired); 1950	Incumbent re-elected.	✓ William Jennings Bryan Dorn (Democratic) 75.2%; H. Grady Ballard (Republican) 24.8%
South Carolina 4	James Mann	Democratic	1968	Incumbent re-elected.	✓ James Mann (Democratic); Unopposed
South Carolina 5	Thomas S. Gettys	Democratic	1964	Incumbent re-elected.	✓ Thomas S. Gettys (Democratic) 65.9%; Lenard Phillips (Republican) 33.0%; Bert Sumner (Independent) 1.0%
South Carolina 6	John L. McMillan	Democratic	1938	Incumbent re-elected.	✓ John L. McMillan (Democratic) 64.1%; Edward B. Baskin (Republican) 34.9%; Charles H. Smith (Independent) 1.1%

== South Dakota ==
District	Incumbent			This race	
District	Member	Party	First elected	Results	Candidates
South Dakota 1	Ben Reifel	Republican	1960	Incumbent retired. Democratic gain.	✓ Frank E. Denholm (Democratic) 56.0%; Dexter H. Gunderson (Republican) 44.0%
South Dakota 2	Ellis Yarnal Berry	Republican	1950	Incumbent retired. Democratic gain.	✓ James Abourezk (Democratic) 52.3%; Fred D. Brady (Republican) 47.7%

== Tennessee ==
District	Incumbent			This race	
District	Member	Party	First elected	Results	Candidates
Tennessee 1	Jimmy Quillen	Republican	1962	Incumbent re-elected.	✓ Jimmy Quillen (Republican) 67.9%; David Bruce Shine (Democratic) 32.1%
Tennessee 2	John Duncan Sr.	Republican	1964	Incumbent re-elected.	✓ John Duncan Sr. (Republican) 73.3%; Roger Cowan (Democratic) 25.7%; William N. Butcher (Independent) 1.0%
Tennessee 3	Bill Brock	Republican	1962	Incumbent retired to run for U.S. senator. Republican hold.	✓ LaMar Baker (Republican) 51.4%; Richard Winningham (Democratic) 45.7%; Robert Shockey (Independent) 1.8%; Frank Massey (Independent) 1.1%
Tennessee 4	Joe L. Evins	Democratic	1946	Incumbent re-elected.	✓ Joe L. Evins (Democratic) 82.6%; J. D. Boles (Republican) 17.4%
Tennessee 5	Richard Fulton	Democratic	1962	Incumbent re-elected.	✓ Richard Fulton (Democratic) 70.6%; George Kelly (Republican) 29.4%
Tennessee 6	William Anderson	Democratic	1964	Incumbent re-elected.	✓ William Anderson (Democratic) 81.7%; Elmer Davies (Republican) 18.3%
Tennessee 7	Ray Blanton	Democratic	1966	Incumbent re-elected.	✓ Ray Blanton (Democratic) 74.2%; W. G. Doss (Republican) 25.8%
Tennessee 8	Ed Jones	Democratic	1969 (Special)	Incumbent re-elected.	✓ Ed Jones (Democratic); Unopposed
Tennessee 9	Dan Kuykendall	Republican	1966	Incumbent re-elected.	✓ Dan Kuykendall (Republican) 62.6%; Michael Osborn (Democratic) 37.4%

== Texas ==
District	Incumbent			This race	
District	Member	Party	First elected	Results	Candidates
Texas 1	Wright Patman	Democratic	1928	Incumbent re-elected.	✓ Wright Patman (Democratic) 78.5%; James Hogan (Republican) 21.5%
Texas 2	John Dowdy	Democratic	1952	Incumbent re-elected.	✓ John Dowdy (Democratic); Unopposed
Texas 3	James M. Collins	Republican	1968	Incumbent re-elected.	✓ James M. Collins (Republican) 60.6%; John Mead (Democratic) 39.4%
Texas 4	Ray Roberts	Democratic	1962	Incumbent re-elected.	✓ Ray Roberts (Democratic); Unopposed
Texas 5	Earle Cabell	Democratic	1964	Incumbent re-elected.	✓ Earle Cabell (Democratic) 59.7%; Frank Crowley (Republican) 40.3%
Texas 6	Olin E. Teague	Democratic	1946	Incumbent re-elected.	✓ Olin E. Teague (Democratic); Unopposed
Texas 7	George H. W. Bush	Republican	1966	Incumbent retired to run for U.S. senator. Republican hold.	✓ Bill Archer (Republican) 64.8%; Jim Greenwood (Democratic) 35.2%
Texas 8	Robert C. Eckhardt	Democratic	1966	Incumbent re-elected.	✓ Robert C. Eckhardt (Democratic); Unopposed
Texas 9	Jack Brooks	Democratic	1952	Incumbent re-elected.	✓ Jack Brooks (Democratic) 64.5%; Henry C. Pressler (Democratic) 35.5%
Texas 10	J. J. Pickle	Democratic	1963 (Special)	Incumbent re-elected.	✓ J. J. Pickle (Democratic); Unopposed
Texas 11	William R. Poage	Democratic	1936	Incumbent re-elected.	✓ William R. Poage (Democratic); Unopposed
Texas 12	Jim Wright	Democratic	1954	Incumbent re-elected.	✓ Jim Wright (Democratic); Unopposed
Texas 13	Graham B. Purcell Jr.	Democratic	1962	Incumbent re-elected.	✓ Graham B. Purcell Jr. (Democratic) 64.9%; Joe H. Staley Jr. (Republican) 35.1%
Texas 14	John Andrew Young	Democratic	1956	Incumbent re-elected.	✓ John Andrew Young (Democratic); Unopposed
Texas 15	Kika de la Garza	Democratic	1964	Incumbent re-elected.	✓ Kika de la Garza (Democratic) 76.2%; Ben A. Martinez (Republican) 23.8%
Texas 16	Richard Crawford White	Democratic	1964	Incumbent re-elected.	✓ Richard Crawford White (Democratic) 82.7%; J. R. Provencio (Republican) 17.3%
Texas 17	Omar Burleson	Democratic	1946	Incumbent re-elected.	✓ Omar Burleson (Democratic); Unopposed
Texas 18	Robert Price	Republican	1966	Incumbent re-elected.	✓ Robert Price (Republican); Unopposed
Texas 19	George H. Mahon	Democratic	1934	Incumbent re-elected.	✓ George H. Mahon (Democratic); Unopposed
Texas 20	Henry B. González	Democratic	1961 (Special)	Incumbent re-elected.	✓ Henry B. González (Democratic); Unopposed
Texas 21	O. C. Fisher	Democratic	1942	Incumbent re-elected.	✓ O. C. Fisher (Democratic) 61.4%; Richard Gill (Republican) 38.6%
Texas 22	Robert R. Casey	Democratic	1958	Incumbent re-elected.	✓ Robert R. Casey (Democratic) 55.6%; Arthur Busch (Republican) 44.4%
Texas 23	Abraham Kazen	Democratic	1966	Incumbent re-elected.	✓ Abraham Kazen (Democratic); Unopposed

== Utah ==
District	Incumbent			This race	
District	Member	Party	First elected	Results	Candidates
Utah 1	Laurence J. Burton	Republican	1962	Incumbent retired to run for U.S. senator. Democratic gain.	✓ K. Gunn McKay (Democratic) 51.3%; Richard Richards (Republican) 47.9%; Daniel L. Worthington (American Independent) 0.8%
Utah 2	Sherman P. Lloyd	Republican	1962; 1964 (retired); 1966	Incumbent re-elected.	✓ Sherman P. Lloyd (Republican) 52.3%; Adolph Herman Nance (Democratic) 46.6%; Stephen D. Marsh (American Independent) 1.1%

== Vermont ==
District	Incumbent			This race	
District	Member	Party	First elected	Results	Candidates
Vermont at-large	Robert Stafford	Republican	1960	Incumbent re-elected.	✓ Robert Stafford (Republican) 68.1%; Bernard O'Shea (Democratic) 29.1%; Dennis J. Morrisseau (Liberty) 2.8%

== Virginia ==
District	Incumbent			This race	
District	Member	Party	First elected	Results	Candidates
Virginia 1	Thomas N. Downing	Democratic	1958	Incumbent re-elected.	✓ Thomas N. Downing (Democratic); Unopposed
Virginia 2	G. William Whitehurst	Republican	1968	Incumbent re-elected.	✓ G. William Whitehurst (Republican) 61.7%; Joseph T. Fitzpatrick (Democratic) 38.3%
Virginia 3	David E. Satterfield III	Democratic	1964	Incumbent re-elected.	✓ David E. Satterfield III (Democratic) 67.5%; J. Harvie Wilkinson III (Republican) 32.5%
Virginia 4	Watkins Moorman Abbitt	Democratic	1948	Incumbent re-elected.	✓ Watkins Moorman Abbitt (Democratic) 61.0%; Ben Ragsdale (Independent) 28.1%; James M. Helms (Republican) 10.9%
Virginia 5	Dan Daniel	Democratic	1968	Incumbent re-elected.	✓ Dan Daniel (Democratic) 73.0%; Allen T. St. Clair (Republican) 27.0%
Virginia 6	Richard Harding Poff	Republican	1952	Incumbent re-elected.	✓ Richard Harding Poff (Republican) 74.6%; Roy R. White (Democratic) 25.4%
Virginia 7	John Otho Marsh Jr.	Democratic	1962	Incumbent retired. Republican gain.	✓ J. Kenneth Robinson (Republican) 61.7%; Murat Williams (Democratic) 38.3%
Virginia 8	William L. Scott	Republican	1966	Incumbent re-elected.	✓ William L. Scott (Republican) 63.8%; Darrel H. Stearns (Democratic) 36.2%
Virginia 9	William C. Wampler	Republican	1952; 1954 (defeated); 1966	Incumbent re-elected.	✓ William C. Wampler (Republican) 60.9%; Tate C. Buchanan (Democratic) 39.1%
Virginia 10	Joel Broyhill	Republican	1952	Incumbent re-elected.	✓ Joel Broyhill (Republican) 54.5%; Harold O. Miller (Democratic) 45.5%

== Washington ==
District	Incumbent			This race	
District	Member	Party	First elected	Results	Candidates
Washington 1	Thomas Pelly	Republican	1952	Incumbent re-elected.	✓ Thomas Pelly (Republican) 64.4%; David A. Hughes (Democratic) 32.0%; Stephanie Coontz (Socialist Workers) 2.6%; Stan Iverson (Independent) 1.0%
Washington 2	Lloyd Meeds	Democratic	1964	Incumbent re-elected.	✓ Lloyd Meeds (Democratic) 72.7%; Edward A. McBride (Republican) 27.3%
Washington 3	Julia Butler Hansen	Democratic	1960	Incumbent re-elected.	✓ Julia Butler Hansen (Democratic) 59.1%; R. C. McConkey (Republican) 40.9%
Washington 4	Catherine Dean May	Republican	1958	Incumbent lost re-election. Democratic gain.	✓ Mike McCormack (Democratic) 52.6%; Catherine Dean May (Republican) 47.4%
Washington 5	Tom Foley	Democratic	1964	Incumbent re-elected.	✓ Tom Foley (Democratic) 67.0%; George Gamble (Republican) 33.0%
Washington 6	Floyd Hicks	Democratic	1964	Incumbent re-elected.	✓ Floyd Hicks (Democratic) 69.4%; John Jarstad (Republican) 29.8%; Richard Congress (Socialist Workers) 0.8%
Washington 7	Brock Adams	Democratic	1964	Incumbent re-elected.	✓ Brock Adams (Democratic) 66.6%; Brian Lewis (Republican) 31.8%; Russell Block (Socialist Workers) 1.6%

== West Virginia ==
District	Incumbent			This race	
District	Member	Party	First elected	Results	Candidates
West Virginia 1	Bob Mollohan	Democratic	1952; 1956 (retired); 1968	Incumbent re-elected.	✓ Bob Mollohan (Democratic) 61.5%; Ken Doll (Republican) 38.5%
West Virginia 2	Harley Orrin Staggers	Democratic	1948	Incumbent re-elected.	✓ Harley Orrin Staggers (Democratic) 62.7%; Reichard Marshall Reddecliff (Republican) 37.3%
West Virginia 3	John M. Slack Jr.	Democratic	1958	Incumbent re-elected.	✓ John M. Slack Jr. (Democratic) 65.4%; Neal A. Kinsolving (Republican) 34.6%
West Virginia 4	Ken Hechler	Democratic	1958	Incumbent re-elected.	✓ Ken Hechler (Democratic) 67.4%; Ralph Lewis Shannon (Republican) 32.6%
West Virginia 5	James Kee	Democratic	1964	Incumbent re-elected.	✓ James Kee (Democratic) 70.4%; Marian McQuade (Republican) 29.6%

== Wisconsin ==
District	Incumbent			This race	
District	Member	Party	First elected	Results	Candidates
Wisconsin 1	Henry C. Schadeberg	Republican	1960; 1964 (defeated); 1966	Incumbent lost re-election. Democratic gain.	✓ Les Aspin (Democratic) 60.9%; Henry C. Schadeberg (Republican) 39.1%
Wisconsin 2	Robert Kastenmeier	Democratic	1958	Incumbent re-elected.	✓ Robert Kastenmeier (Democratic) 68.5%; Norman Anderson (Republican) 31.0%; Lavern F. Krohn (American Independent) 0.5%
Wisconsin 3	Vernon Wallace Thomson	Republican	1960	Incumbent re-elected.	✓ Vernon Wallace Thomson (Republican) 55.5%; Ray Short (Democratic) 44.5%
Wisconsin 4	Clement J. Zablocki	Democratic	1948	Incumbent re-elected.	✓ Clement J. Zablocki (Democratic) 80.3%; Phillip D. Mrozinski (Republican) 18.1%; John A. Zierhut (American Independent) 1.6%
Wisconsin 5	Henry S. Reuss	Democratic	1954	Incumbent re-elected.	✓ Henry S. Reuss (Democratic) 75.9%; Robert J. Dwyer (Republican) 23.0%; Earl R. Denny (American Independent) 0.8%; James E. Boulton (Progressive) 0.3%
Wisconsin 6	William A. Steiger	Republican	1966	Incumbent re-elected.	✓ William A. Steiger (Republican) 67.7%; Franklin R. Utech (Democratic) 30.8%; Rani V. Davidson (American Independent) 1.5%
Wisconsin 7	Dave Obey	Democratic	1969 (Special)	Incumbent re-elected.	✓ Dave Obey (Democratic) 67.6%; Andre E. Le Tendre (Republican) 31.5%; Richard D. Wolfe (American Independent) 0.9%
Wisconsin 8	John W. Byrnes	Republican	1944	Incumbent re-elected.	✓ John W. Byrnes (Republican) 55.5%; Robert John Cornell (Democratic) 43.6%; Joseph W. Dery (American Independent) 0.9%
Wisconsin 9	Glenn Robert Davis	Republican	1947 (special); 1956 (retired); 1964	Incumbent re-elected.	✓ Glenn Robert Davis (Republican) 52.0%; Fred N. Tabak (Democratic) 48.0%
Wisconsin 10	Alvin O'Konski	Republican	1942	Incumbent re-elected.	✓ Alvin O'Konski (Republican) 50.9%; Walter Thoresen (Democratic) 48.6%; William Hable (American Independent) 0.5%

== Wyoming ==
District	Incumbent			This race	
District	Member	Party	First elected	Results	Candidates
Wyoming at-large	John S. Wold	Republican	1968	Incumbent retired to run for U.S. senator. Democratic gain.	✓ Teno Roncalio (Democratic) 50.3%; Harry Roberts (Republican) 49.7%

== See also ==
- 1970 United States elections
  - 1970 United States gubernatorial elections
  - 1970 United States Senate elections
- 91st United States Congress
- 92nd United States Congress

== Works cited ==
- Abramson, Paul; Aldrich, John; Rohde, David (1995). Change and Continuity in the 1992 Elections. CQ Press. ISBN 0871878399.
