= Barbara Franklin =

American politician

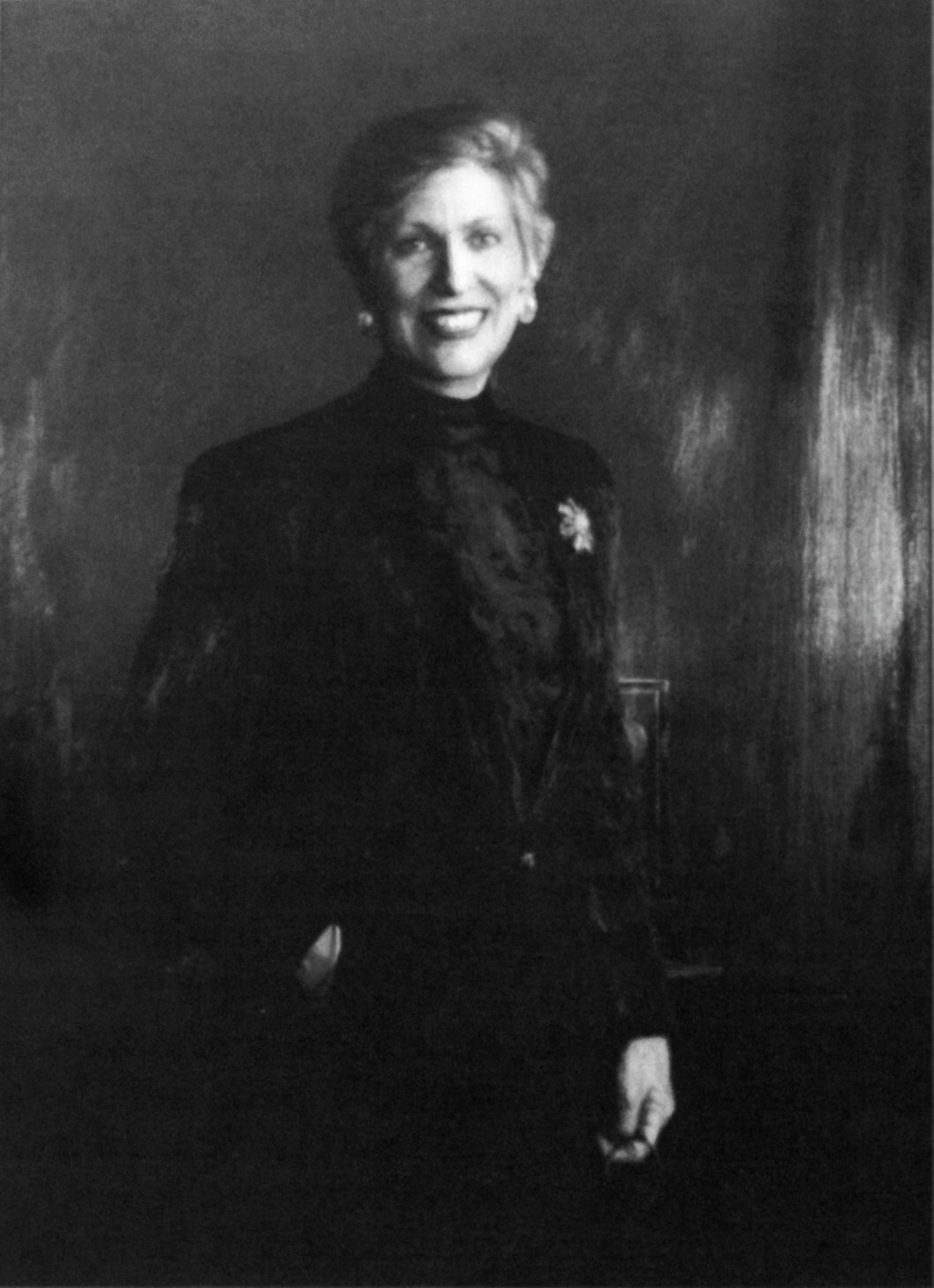

29th United States Secretary of Commerce
- In office February 27, 1992 – January 20, 1993
- President: George H. W. Bush
- Preceded by: Robert Mosbacher
- Succeeded by: Ron Brown

Personal details
- Born: Barbara Ann Hackman; March 19, 1940 (age 86) Lancaster, Pennsylvania, U.S.
- Party: Republican
- Spouse: Wallace Barnes (m. 1986; died 2020)
- Education: Pennsylvania State University, University Park (BA); Harvard University (MBA)

Barbara Ann Hackman Franklin (née Hackman; born March 19, 1940) is an American government official, corporate director, and business executive. She served as the 29th U.S. Secretary of Commerce from 1992 to 1993 to President George H. W. Bush, during which she led a presidential mission to China.

Before her cabinet position, Franklin served in the presidential administrations of Richard Nixon, Gerald Ford, Jimmy Carter, and Ronald Reagan. She was one of the original commissioners and first vice chair of the U.S. Consumer Product Safety Commission. In 2006, she received the Woodrow Wilson Award for Public Service.

Franklin has served on the board of directors of 18 companies, including Dow Chemical, Aetna Inc., Westinghouse, and Nordstrom. Directorship magazine and the American Management Association named her one of the most influential people in corporate governance, and in 2014, she was inducted into the Directorship 100 Hall of Fame. She is the president and CEO of Barbara Franklin Enterprises, a private international consulting firm.

Franklin was one of the first women graduates of the Harvard Business School. She was married to Wallace Barnes, retired Chair and CEO of Barnes Group.

== Early life, family, and education ==
Born as Barbara Ann Hackman in Lancaster, Pennsylvania, on March 19, 1940, to Mayme (née Haller) and Arthur A. Hackman. She attended Hempfield High School in Landisville, Pennsylvania. Before her graduation in 1958, she was the class valedictorian, president of the student council, captain of the field hockey and tennis teams, and a cheerleader.

In 1962, Franklin graduated from Pennsylvania State University and received its Distinguished Alumni Award in 1972. She is a sister of Kappa Alpha Theta and was its Beta Phi chapter president. At Penn State, she was the president of Mortar Board, secretary-treasurer of Pi Sigma Alpha, a member of the Liberal Arts Student Council, and a representative to the Student Government Association. Dorothy Lipp, the dean of women at Penn State, nominated Franklin for a full-scholarship to Harvard Business School, which was, for the first time, opening its doors to women and would accept one nomination from Penn State. With a partial scholarship and loans, Franklin entered the newly co-ed Harvard Business School as one of 14 women in a class of 680 men. In 1964, Franklin received her M.B.A. from Harvard Business School, and was honored with an Alumni Achievement Award in 2004.

For several years after her graduation, she worked in the corporate world. She joined the Singer Company in New York City, first in the consumer products division and then as a member of the corporate planning staff. At Singer, she became manager of environmental analysis, creating a new function that tracked competitive activity globally. After four years there, she became the assistant vice president on the corporate planning staff of the First National City Bank (later Citibank) in New York City from 1969 to 1971. At the time, she was tasked by the CEO, Walter Wriston, to study the bank's relationships with government entities. Her analysis led to the bank's first government relations department, which she created and headed until 1971.

== Government service ==
=== Nixon administration ===
In 1971, while at the First National City Bank, Franklin was recruited by President Richard Nixon to bring more qualified women into high-level policy-making government positions. Her appointment was part of a multi-pronged initiative by the Nixon administration following a press conference on February 6, 1969. During this press conference, Vera Glaser, a reporter for the North American Newspaper Alliance, asked President Nixon,

Mr. President, in staffing your administration, you have so far made about 200 high-level Cabinet and other policy position appointments, and of these only three have gone to women. Can you tell us, sir, whether we can expect a more equitable recognition of women's abilities, or are we going to remain a lost sex?

In February 1971, Nixon gave Fred Malek, head of Presidential Personnel and a former classmate of Franklin's at Harvard Business School, the task of hiring a woman who would spearhead the effort to recruit other women for policy-making government jobs. Malek asked Franklin to be this recruiter, and on April 12, 1971, Franklin began her position for this presidential initiative. An official press release from the White House announced Franklin on April 22, 1971, as a "Staff Assistant to the President for Executive Manpower" – a title that was later changed to "Staff Assistant to the President" after her first press conference, wherein the press questioned how she could recruit women with the word manpower in her title.

On April 21, 1971, Nixon directed the heads of White House departments and independent agencies to create specific action plans to "clearly demonstrate our recognition of the equality of women by making greater use of their skills in high level positions." He required these executive departments to:

1. Develop and put into action a plan for attracting more qualified women to top appointive positions by the end of the year;
2. Develop and put into action a plan for significantly increasing the number of women, career and appointive, in mid-level positions;
3. Ensure the substantial numbers of the vacancies on their Advisory Boards and Committees be filled with well-qualified women; and
4. Designate an overall coordinator who will be held responsible for the success of the project. On each of these requirements, Nixon required the heads to submit their plans no later than May 15, 1971.

Following the release of this memorandum, Franklin was charged with monitoring the implementation progress of each department's action plans.

By April 1972, along with the other presidential initiatives, Franklin's efforts led to the tripling of women placed into policy-making positions, from 36 to 105 women in this first year alone. By May 1973, this number further increased to 130 women, and Franklin had created a talent bank of 1,000 qualified women for future openings. More than half of these policy-making positions to which women were appointed during this time were previously held only by men. Among them were Cynthia Holcomb Hall, judge on the United States Tax Court; Marina von Neumann Whitman, the first woman on the president's Council of Economic Advisers; Romana Banuelos, the first Hispanic to be U.S. treasurer; Betty Southard Murphy, general counsel of the National Labor Relations Board; and Dixy Lee Ray, the first and only woman to chair the U.S. Atomic Energy Commission.

At the mid-level, more than 1,000 women were advanced into positions that women had never held, such as sky marshals, tug boat captains, FBI agents, and forest rangers. The number of women appointed to boards and commissions increased as well, from over 250 in the first year, to 339 women by the end of May 1973. It was during this time that the first women became generals and admirals in the U.S. Armed Forces.

==== A Matter of Simple Justice ====
On March 8, 2012, the book A Matter of Simple Justice: The Untold Story of Barbara Hackman Franklin and A Few Good Women was launched at the National Archives and Records Administration in Washington, D.C., in a program covered by C-SPAN and moderated by Judy Woodruff of PBS NewsHour. Lee Stout, Librarian Emeritus and former Head of Public Services and Outreach for Special Collections at the Penn State University Libraries, wrote the book. When he retired in 2007, Stout had served as Penn State's university archivist for 27 years. In 1994, Franklin donated her governmental papers to the Penn State University Archives. Stout was cataloging Franklin's papers when he became interested in those that detailed her service to recruit women in the Nixon administration. He called Franklin and suggested an oral history project to preserve the memories of the men and women involved in this presidential initiative.

In 1997, the "A Few Good Women" oral history project was created with an advisory board chaired by Franklin and with a cooperative relationship with the Penn State University Libraries. Initially, the board had a list of twelve women appointees from the Nixon administration to be interviewed, including Margita White, Constance B. Newman, and Helen Delich Bentley, former Congresswoman and Chair of the Federal Maritime Commission. The list eventually expanded to include nearly 50 interviews currently housed in the Special Collections Library at Penn State University.

A Matter of Simple Justice: The Untold Story of Barbara Hackman Franklin and A Few Good Women is based on the "A Few Good Women" oral history project. In a two-part format, the book first focuses on the historical narrative of the Nixon administration's efforts to bring women into high-level government positions, Franklin's specific efforts, and the results of this period. In the second part of the book, Stout highlights the personal stories of many of the other interviewees from this project, such as Ambassador Anne Armstrong, Senator Elizabeth Dole, Judge Cynthia Hall, and Secretary of Housing and Urban Development Carla Hills. Interviewees talk about early influences, breaking down barriers, the impact on family, the role of networking, and the challenge of gaining entry into the legal profession.

The "A Few Good Women" project has received major funding from the Aetna Foundation, which has also provided grants for the "A Few Good Women" teaching aids project, designed by Penn State University Libraries staff. The teaching aids are designed to provide oral histories, biographies, audio segments, images, and digitized historical documents of the "A Few Good Women" collection as a curriculum for grades 6–12 students.

=== Consumer Product Safety Commission ===
Franklin's accomplishments as a staff assistant to President Nixon led to her nomination by Nixon as one of the first of five original commissioners of the Consumer Product Safety Commission (CPSC). She was sworn in on May 14, 1973, for a term of seven years. She served under presidents Nixon, Gerald Ford, and Jimmy Carter. On June 13, 1973, she was elected and served as the first Vice Chair of the CPSC until 1974. She served again as the Vice Chair from 1977 to 1978. During these years, Franklin concentrated on improving children's safety and pioneering cost/benefit analysis. Her letters to President Carter and her speeches led to that administration's creation of the United States Regulatory Council to coordinate the numerous agencies engaged in research or regulation of carcinogens, such as the Occupational Safety and Health Administration (OSHA), the Environmental Protection Agency (EPA), and the Food and Drug Administration (FDA).

=== Part-time presidential appointments ===
Before she was appointed Secretary of Commerce, Franklin held several part-time presidential appointment positions, including her membership of the President's Advisory Committee for Trade Policy and Negotiations (1982–86; 89–91) by appointment of presidents Ronald Reagan and George H.W. Bush. She chaired the Task Force of Tax Reform (1985–86) and was a member of the North American Free Trade Agreement (1991). She was appointed by President George H. W. Bush and confirmed by the U.S. Senate to serve as an Alternative Representative & Public Delegate, UN General Assembly, 44th Session (1989–90).

=== Secretary of Commerce ===
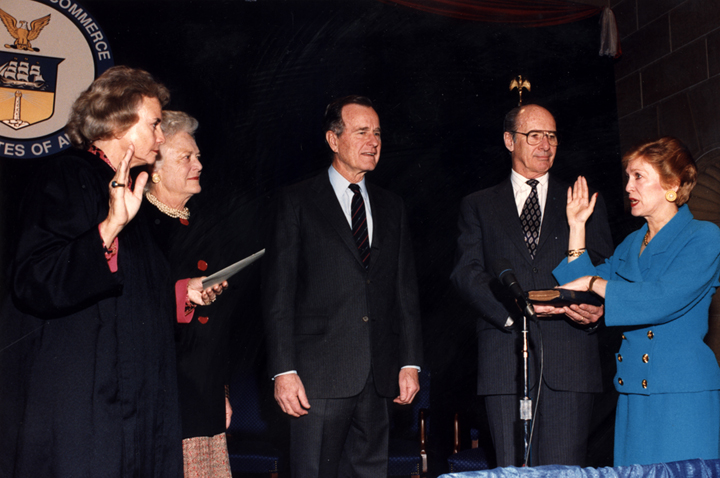
Franklin being sworn in as the Secretary of Commerce.

On December 26, 1991, President George H.W. Bush announced his intention to nominate Franklin as the 29th Secretary of Commerce, replacing Robert Mosbacher. This nomination was approved by the United States Senate, and shortly thereafter, she was sworn in on February 27, 1992, which made Franklin the highest-ranking woman in the George H.W. Bush administration and the 13th woman to serve in the US Cabinet.

As Secretary of Commerce, she achieved a major goal: increasing American exports, most notably with China, Russia, Japan, and Mexico. She led a presidential mission to China in December 1992 to normalize commercial relations between the United States and China. In China, she and her counterpart, Minister Li Lanqing, reconvened the Seventh Session of the U.S.-China Joint Commission on Commerce and Trade (JCCT). The JCCT had been moribund since the events at Tiananmen Square in June 1989, when the U.S. placed a sanction on China banning high-level government-to-government contact. Her mission lifted that sanction and brought back $1 billion in new contracts for American companies. This mission gave a "green light" to U.S. companies interested in business opportunities in China, and trade with China grew dramatically in the ensuing years, as did U.S. investment in China.

In a letter to the editor of The New York Times published on December 29, 1992, Franklin said:

Several weeks ago President Bush asked me to lead a Presidential mission to China, following his decision to resume high-level economic talks with the Chinese. The driving rationale for the mission was to promote economic growth and jobs in the United States by insuring that American businesses have the support and opportunity to capitalize on the booming Chinese market, growing at 12 percent a year ... President Bush's policy of constructive engagement is a long-term investment in our economic future and is already delivering results in China and in the United States ... The interagency delegation I led to China and Hong Kong came back with almost $1 billion in business, and more important, we made it abundantly clear to the Chinese that they must address our concerns over the growing trade imbalance between China and the United States.

In January 1993, Franklin's appointment as Commerce Secretary ended with the inauguration of Bill Clinton to the presidency.

== Political activity ==
Franklin has been a participant in every Republican convention from 1972 to 2008 as a delegate, organizer, or speaker and has been involved in numerous campaigns, both on the national and state levels. Franklin was an early supporter of George H. W. Bush following his bid for the 1988 nomination. She was co-chair of the national finance committee, organized outreach activities, and chaired a fundraising dinner in 1991 for his campaign that raised more than $1 million.

== Business and corporate governance ==
In 1979, Franklin was named a Senior Fellow of the Wharton School of Business at the University of Pennsylvania. From 1980 to 1988, she worked and lectured at the Wharton School's MBA program and served as the Wharton Government and Business Program director. At Wharton, Franklin recreated a program to bring MBA candidates to Washington, D.C., as part of their coursework.

Following her departure from the Consumer Product Safety Commission, Franklin was offered seats on the boards of several large U.S. companies, such as Dow Chemical, Aetna, Inc., and Westinghouse. By the end of the 1980s, Franklin was on the boards of seven large companies. The American Management Association cited her as one of America's 50 most influential corporate directors. Franklin has served on the board of directors of 14 public and four private companies. She has served on every possible board committee, chaired six public company audit committees, served on two governance committees, and served as lead director. She was the non-executive chair of Guest Services, Inc.

She is a member of the International Advisory Board of LafargeHolcim, Zurich, Switzerland. She became Chair Emerita of the National Association of Corporate Directors (NACD) in May 2013, following the completion of a four-year term during which NACD expanded dramatically. She is Chair Emerita of the Economic Club of New York, of which she served as the first woman chair, and is the past president and first woman president of the Management Executives Society.

She is a board member of the U.S.-China Business Council, a board member of the National Committee on United States – China Relations, the Atlantic Council, the Richard Nixon Foundation and the National Symphony Orchestra. She is a member of the Committee for Economic Development (CED), the Council on Foreign Relations, the Asia Society, the International Women's Forum, and member emeritus of the Public Company Accounting Oversight Board (PCAOB) Advisory Council. She is a former trustee of the Pennsylvania State University and a former member of the Board of Dean's Advisors at Harvard Business School.

Franklin is a founding member of Executive Women in Government and of the Women's Forum of Washington, D.C. Franklin has been a regular commentator on international economic matters and corporate governance on national media sources, most notably PBS's Nightly Business Report.

Before she served as Secretary of Commerce, in 1984, she founded Franklin Associates, a management and consulting firm, where she served as the president and CEO until 1992. She is the president and CEO of Barbara Franklin Enterprises, headquartered in Washington, DC.

== Awards and honorary degrees ==
=== Governance awards ===
- 1981: Award for Corporate Leadership, Catalyst
- 1987: Directors' Choice Award, National Women's Economic Alliance
- 1990: 50 Most Influential Corporate Directors, American Management Association
- 1992: John J. McCloy Award for Contributions to Excellence in Auditing, Public Oversight Board, American Institute of Certified Public Accountants
- 2000: Director of the Year, National Association of Corporate Directors (NACD)
- 2003: Outstanding Director, Class of 2003, Outstanding Directors' Exchange (ODX)
- 2007: Directorship 100, Most Influential People & Organizations in Governance
- 2009: Top 25 Female Corporate Directors, BusinessWeek
- 2009: Directorship 100, Most Influential People & Organizations in Governance
- 2014: Directorship 100 Hall of Fame, Most Influential People & Organizations in Governance
- 2015: Hall of Fame, Financial Executives International

=== Leadership awards ===
- 1971: Distinguished Woman Award, Northwood Institute
- 1972: Mother Gerard Phelan Medal, Marymount University (VA)
- 1972: Distinguished Alumni Award, The Pennsylvania State University
- 1977: Alumni Fellow, The Pennsylvania State University
- 1978: Certificate of Appreciation, American Academy of Pediatrics
- 1979: 6th Annual Recognition Award, American Association of Poison Control Centers
- 1980: Award for Excellence in Management, Simmons College (MA)
- 1988: Corporate Social Responsibility Award, City University of New York
- 1992: Citation, Executive Women in Government
- 1996: Women Who Make A Difference, International Women's Forum
- 2002: Prescott Bush Award, Connecticut Republicans
- 2004: Alumni Achievement Award, Harvard Business School
- 2004: Alumni Achievement Award, Mortar Board
- 2005: Laureate, Junior Achievement of Southwest New England Business Hall of Fame
- 2006: The Woodrow Wilson Award for Public Service, The Woodrow Wilson International Center for Scholars
- 2009: Distinguished Alumni Award, Hempfield High School
- 2013: World of Difference 100 Award, The International Alliance for Women
- 2013: Connecticut Women's Hall of Fame
- 2016: Lifetime Achievement Award in US-China Relations, The US-China Policy Foundation
- 2017: 50 Women Who Made American Political History, Time magazine
- 2020: Human Relations Award, The National Conference for Community and Justice
- 2022: First Pitch, Congressional Women's Softball Charity Game for the Young Survival Coalition
- 2023: Government Hall of Fame, Government Executive

Franklin is also included in numerous "Who's Who" publications.

=== Honorary degrees ===
- 1973: Bryant College, Providence, RI
- 1990: Drexel University, Philadelphia, PA
- 1994: University of Hartford, Hartford, CT
- 1996: Briarwood College, Southington, CT
- 2001: University of New Haven, West Haven, CT

== See also ==
- List of female United States Cabinet members

Political offices
Preceded by Robert Mosbacher	United States Secretary of Commerce; 1992–1993	Succeeded by Ron Brown
U.S. order of precedence (ceremonial)
Preceded by Andrew Card as Former U.S. Cabinet Member	Order of precedence of the United States as Former U.S. Cabinet Member	Succeeded by Robert Reich as Former U.S. Cabinet Member
