= 1970 Connecticut gubernatorial election =

- November 3, 1970
- Turnout: 80.5%
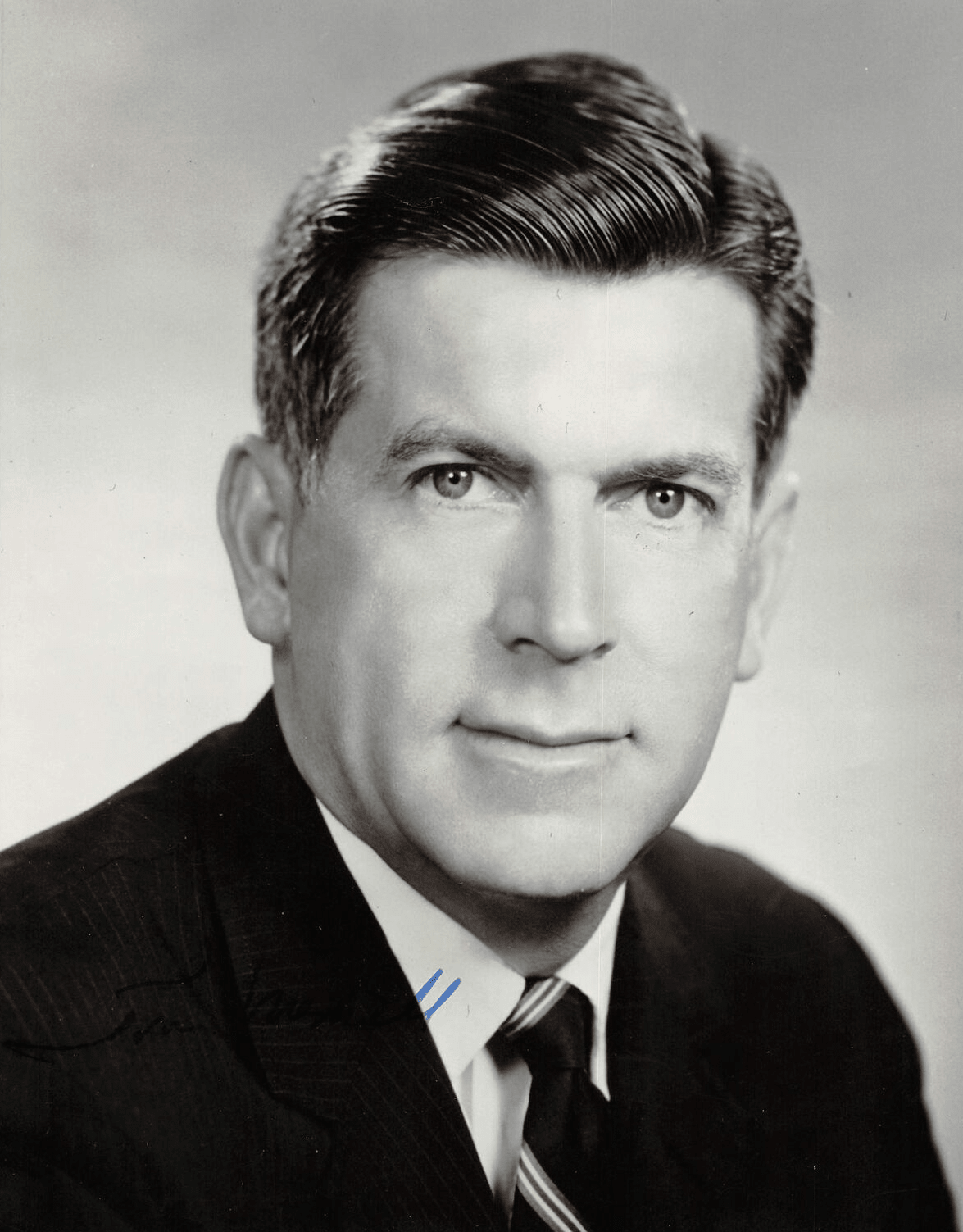

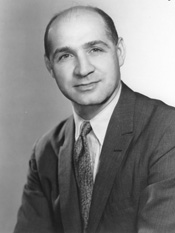
Nominee	Thomas J. Meskill	Emilio Q. Daddario
Party	Republican	Democratic
Running mate	T. Clark Hull	Hugh C. Curran
Popular vote	582,160	500,561
Percentage	53.76%	46.23%
- Meskill: 50–60% 60–70% 70–80% 80–90% Daddario: 50–60% 60–70%
Governor before election
John N. Dempsey
Democratic
Elected Governor
Thomas Meskill
Republican

The 1970 Connecticut gubernatorial election was held on November 3, 1970 in the U.S. state of Connecticut.

Incumbent Democratic Governor John N. Dempsey decided not to run for re-election. Republican nominee Thomas Meskill defeated Democratic nominee Emilio Q. Daddario with 53.76% of the vote. This was the only time a Republican was elected Governor from 1954 to 1990.

== Nominations ==
Between 1956 and 1990 in Connecticut, party conventions nominated candidates subject to a system of "challenge" primaries that allowed defeated candidates to petition for a popular vote if they received at least 20 percent of the convention vote.

=== Democratic nomination ===
==== Candidates ====
- Emilio Q. Daddario, U.S. Representative for the 1st district

==== Results ====
Daddario was unopposed for the nomination at the state convention.

=== Republican nomination ===
==== Candidates ====
- Wallace Barnes, State Senate Minority leader
- Thomas Meskill, U.S. Representative for the 6th district

==== Results ====
The Republican state convention was held on June 20, 1970 at Hartford.

Republican convention results
Party	Candidate	Votes	%
Republican	Thomas Meskill	798	77.55
Republican	Wallace Barnes	231	22.45
Total votes		1,029	100.00

The Republican primary election was held on August 12, 1970.

Republican primary results
Party	Candidate	Votes	%
Republican	Thomas Meskill	93,419	71.42
Republican	Wallace Barnes	37,383	28.58
Total votes		130,802	100.00

== General election ==
=== Candidates ===
- Emilio Q. Daddario, Democratic
- Thomas J. Meskill, Republican

=== Results ===
1970 Connecticut gubernatorial election
Party	Candidate	Votes	%	±%
Republican	Thomas Meskill	582,160	53.76%	
Democratic	Emilio Q. Daddario	500,561	46.23%	
Write-ins		76	0.01%	
Majority		81,599	7.54%	
Turnout		1,082,797	100.00%	
Republican gain from Democratic		Swing		

== Bibliography ==
- Glashan, Roy R. (1979). American Governors and Gubernatorial Elections, 1775-1978. Meckler Books. ISBN 0-930466-17-9.
- Gubernatorial Elections, 1787-1997. Washington, D.C.: Congressional Quarterly Inc. 1998. ISBN 1-56802-396-0.
- Scammon, Richard M., ed. (1972). America Votes 9: a handbook of contemporary American election statistics, 1970. Washington, D.C.: Governmental Affairs Institute. ISBN 9780871870339.
