= Emilio Daddario =

American politician (1918–2010)

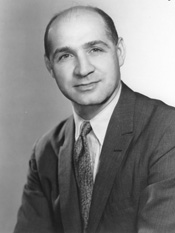

Member of the U.S. House of Representatives from Connecticut's 1st district
- In office January 3, 1959 – January 3, 1971
- Preceded by: Edwin H. May Jr.
- Succeeded by: William R. Cotter

Personal details
- Born: Emilio Quincy Daddario; September 24, 1918 Newton Centre, Massachusetts, U.S.
- Died: July 7, 2010 (aged 91) Washington, D.C., U.S.
- Party: Democratic
- Spouse: Berenice M. Carbo
- Children: 1
- Relatives: Alexandra Daddario (granddaughter); Matthew Daddario (grandson)
- Education: Wesleyan University; University of Connecticut School of Law
- Occupation: Attorney

Emilio Quincy Daddario (September 24, 1918 – July 7, 2010) was an American Democratic politician from Connecticut. He served as a member of the 86th through 91st United States Congresses.

== Life and career ==
Daddario was born on September 24, 1918, in Newton Centre, Massachusetts, the son of Italian parents, Attilio and Giovanna (née Ciovacco) Daddario. He attended public school in Boston as well as Tilton Academy in New Hampshire and the Newton Country Day School in Massachusetts. In 1939, he graduated from Wesleyan University in Middletown, Connecticut.

Daddario attended Boston University Law School from 1939 to 1941 but transferred to the University of Connecticut School of Law from which he graduated in 1942. He was admitted to the bar in Connecticut and Massachusetts that year. He began his law practice in Middletown, Connecticut. In February 1943 he enlisted as a private in the United States Army. He was assigned to the Office of Strategic Services at Fort Meade, Maryland and served in the Mediterranean Theater of Operations. "According to the 2004 book Mussolini: The Last 600 Days of Il Duce, by Ray Moseley, Mr. Daddario was credited with capturing Benito Mussolini's chief of staff, Rodolfo Graziani, at the Hotel Milan in April 1945. Daddario's decorations included the Legion of Merit and the Bronze Star Medal." He was a captain when he left the service in September 1945 and received the Italian Medaglia d'Argento.

Daddario continued his military service in the Connecticut National Guard. He served as mayor of Middletown, Connecticut from 1946 to 1948. He was appointed a judge of the Middletown Municipal Court where he served from 1948 to 1950. During the Korean War, he returned to active duty as a major with the Forty-third Division of the Connecticut National Guard in the Far East Liaison Group until 1952. He then returned to his law practice in Hartford, Connecticut.

Daddario won election in 1958 to the Eighty-sixth Congress and served until January 3, 1971. "On Capitol Hill, he chaired the House Science Committee's subcommittee on science research and development, and the subcommittee on patents and science inventions. He also served on a subcommittee that was involved with the planning and development of the Apollo missions to the moon." He did not seek re-election to the Ninety-second Congress in 1970. He ran unsuccessfully for Governor of Connecticut in 1970, losing the general election to Thomas J. Meskill. He continued his career in public service as Director of the Office of Technology Assessment from 1973 to 1977.

"For his sustained contributions to science and the national welfare during the years he served as a Congressman," Daddario was awarded the Public Welfare Medal from the National Academy of Sciences in 1976. He served as president of the American Association for the Advancement of Science from 1977 to 1978. From 1979 to 1989, he co-chaired the National Conference of Lawyers and Scientists, which was a joint committee of the American Bar Association and the American Association for the Advancement of Science.

Daddario was married to the former Berenice M. Carbo. He died on July 7, 2010, from heart failure, according to his son, Richard, the New York Police Department's incoming deputy commissioner for counter-terrorism. At the time of his death he lived in Washington, D.C.

Two of his grandchildren, Alexandra and Matthew, are actors.

== See also ==
- Connecticut's congressional delegations

Party political offices
Preceded by John N. Dempsey	Democratic nominee for Governor of Connecticut; 1970	Succeeded by Ella Grasso
U.S. House of Representatives
Preceded by Edwin H. May Jr.	Member of the U.S. House of Representatives from Connecticut's 1st congressional district 1959–1971	Succeeded by William R. Cotter
