= Wallace Barnes =

American politician (1926–2020)

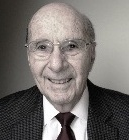
- Born: March 22, 1926; Bristol, Connecticut, U.S.
- Died: December 10, 2020 (aged 94); Washington, D.C., U.S.
- Education: Deerfield Academy, Williams College, Yale Law School
- Political party: Republican
- Spouse: Barbara Hackman Franklin

Wallace Barnes (March 22, 1926 – December 10, 2020) was the chairman and chief executive officer of Barnes Group, Inc., a global manufacturer of aerospace and industrial components. The company's symbol is "B" on the New York Stock Exchange.

Barnes was a former member of the Connecticut State Senate, a Connecticut gubernatorial candidate, and Bristol, Connecticut Republican town chairman. He practiced law and served on numerous public and private company boards. He was a delegate to eight national GOP conventions.

A graduate of Williams College and Yale Law School, he was married to Barbara Hackman Franklin, former US Secretary of Commerce. They resided in Bristol, Connecticut, and Washington, D.C. Barnes is a member of the Barnes family, the first settlers of Bristol.

== Early life and family ==
Barnes was born in Bristol, Connecticut, to Lillian (née Houbertz) and Harry Clarke Barnes as one of four children. He was named after his grandfather, Wallace Barnes, the founder of the Barnes Group in 1857, and is a direct descendant of Ebenezer Barnes, who became the first permanent settler of Bristol in 1728. His grandfather, Wallace Barnes, was born in 1827 and worked at his Bristol family store as a druggist and later as a clock-maker for several firms. When one firm went bankrupt, they offered the elder Barnes his back wages in the form of hoop skirt wire. The elder Barnes then sold the hoop skirt wire for over $1,500 and started his own business manufacturing hoops and steel springs in 1857; later, in 1859, he continued solely with springs when the hoop-skirt demand declined. This manufacturing company proved to be the beginnings of the Barnes Group.

As a teenager, Barnes became interested in flying and joined the U.S. Army Air Corps as an aviation cadet in World War II. He attended Bristol public schools before graduating from Deerfield Academy in 1944. Barnes graduated Phi Beta Kappa, cum laude, from Williams College in 1949 with a Bachelor of Arts degree in economics, serving as class vice president.

After graduating, he went to Yale University and graduated with an LL.B. degree in 1952, and served as a member of the editorial board of the Yale Law Journal.

== Career ==
=== Flying ===
Barnes became a licensed pilot in his teenage years. He was a professional Airline Transport Pilot with a type rating in the Cessna Citation and the Lear 23-24 Series. He owned a plane, which was stored in his Connecticut home. In 1949, while at Williams, Barnes founded Nutmeg Air Transport Inc., a charter airline, and served as its president until 1955. He worked as the assistant to the Treasurer of Northeast Airlines, Inc., a commercial air carrier, in 1951.

In December 2012, Barnes won the Federal Aviation Administration's Wright Brothers Master Pilot Award, which "recognizes pilots who have demonstrated professionalism, skill and aviation expertise by maintaining safe operations for 50 or more years."

=== The Barnes Group ===
From 1952 to 1962, Barnes, a member of the American Bar Association and the Connecticut Bar Association, worked as a partner in Beach, Calder & Barnes in Bristol. In 1963, the Associated Spring Corporation, which grew out of the elder Wallace Barnes's spring manufacturing company in the 1890s, became listed on the New York Stock Exchange. Barnes was named president of the group that same year. The Associated Spring Corp. supplied the springs for Apollo 11 when it landed on the moon in 1969.

In 1976, the Associated Spring Corp. was officially renamed The Barnes Group. In 1977, Barnes became the chair and chief executive officer, a position he served until he retired in 1991. William R. Fenoglio became the next CEO that year, the first time an executive from outside the Barnes family ever held such a position.

After retiring as CEO, Barnes continued to serve as chairman until he left the board due to age limitations in 1996. He had served on the board since 1963 as chair of the management development committee and as a member of the executive committee and the committee on board directors.

=== Political career ===
Barnes served as Bristol Republican town chairman from 1953 to 1955, and in 1954, was the Republican nominee for U.S. Congress in the 1st District. He lost to the incumbent Democrat Thomas J. Dodd, later a U.S. Senator, with 43.0% of the vote. In 1958, he was elected as a Connecticut State Senator in the 5th Senatorial District, where he served for two terms until 1962. From 1966-1970, he was elected a Connecticut State Senator in the 8th Senatorial District and also served as the ranking Republican Member of the Appropriations Committee and a member of the Governor's Finance Advisory Committee. During this time, he worked on court reform and environmental issues, and was unanimously elected Senate Minority Leader in November 1968.

In April 1969, the Connecticut Senate Republicans were angered by the Democratic Senators for convening private meetings or caucuses that lasted until 4:00 pm or 6:00 pm, despite the Senate being supposed to convene altogether at 2:00 pm each day. At the time, the Democrats outnumbered the Republicans 24 to 12. On Wednesday, April 23, the Republicans began banging their shoes on their desks in protest after the Democratic majority emerged from a private caucus several hours late, mirroring Nikita Khrushchev's shoe-banging incident at the United Nations in 1960. On Thursday, April 24, Barnes placed his right boot on his desk "as a symbol of the protest."

The culmination of this symbolic protest was on Tuesday, May 6, 1969, when the Republicans placed several hundred pairs of shoes on the sidewalk in front of the state capitol. While Barnes was not present for this incident, a research assistant and secretary from his staff were involved in the demonstration. The shoes were eventually donated.

From 1966 to 1967, he served on the Governor's Clean Water Task Force and the Governor's Committee for Equal Employment Opportunity. In February 1997, Governor John Rowland of Connecticut appointed Barnes Chairman of the Connecticut Employment and Training Commission, a position which is charged with overseeing and improving the coordination of all education, employment, and training programs in Connecticut.

In 1970, Barnes ran against Thomas J. Meskill for the Republican nomination for governor in Connecticut. Before the August 1970 primary, Meskill was the Republican convention-endorsed candidate. Barnes was later defeated in the primary. In 2004, when Meskill died, Barnes remarked in his obituary that the two were friends before the primary and remained so for long afterward.

Barnes was a delegate to the Republican National Convention in 1956, 1958, 1960, 1964, 1988, 1992, 2004, and 2008.

=== Civic and corporate career ===
Barnes has served on the boards of numerous public and private companies. In 1962, Barnes began serving as a Bristol Board of Finance member for three years. That same year, he was also on the executive committee of the Connecticut Regional Import-Export Council. Barnes became president of the Bristol Boys and Girls Club in 1965 and served until 1968, when he became an honorary director. In 1956, he served as president of the Bristol Community Chest.

He has been on the board of trustees at the Yale–New Haven Hospital, the CT Policy and Economic Council, and the Family Center. He is a Life Member and was on the board of regents of the University of Hartford, where he served as chair from 1991 to 1993, from which he received an honorary degree in 1988.

Barnes has also been a director of nearly twenty companies and groups, including the Metro Hartford Chamber of Commerce, the Manufacturer's Association of Hartford (and was also president from 1965 to 1968), the Automobile Insurance Company of Hartford, the Loctite Corporation, the Rogers Corporation, and many others. He was a director of Rohr, Inc. from 1988 to 1998, where he served as chair from 1994 to 1998 and as chair of the Tradewind Turbines Corporation from 1994 to 1998.

In 1971, Barnes joined the board of directors of the Aetna Life and Casualty Company, a holding company of the Aetna Life Insurance Company. He served on the board until 1996. In 1984, he met fellow director Barbara Hackman Franklin and invited her to a corporate function; the two were married two years later. When Franklin later became Secretary of Commerce in 1992, she had to "recuse herself from decisions on the auto and aircraft parts industries because her husband's family business, the Barnes Group, is a manufacturer of car and aircraft parts."

== Awards ==
In 1955, the Jaycees honored Barnes as the "Outstanding Young Man of the Year". In 1967, the Boys Club of America gave Barnes the "Keystone Award", which recognizes leadership and service. On March 24, 2008, the Tunxis Community College in Farmington, Connecticut, named their new art gallery The Wallace Barnes and Barbara Hackman Franklin Art Gallery.

Connecticut State Senate
Preceded by Philip J. Bauer	Member of the Connecticut State Senate from the 5th district 1959–1963	Succeeded by Ralph M. Shulansky
Preceded by Paul J. Falsey	Member of the Connecticut State Senate from the 8th district 1967–1971	Succeeded by Lewis Rome
