= William R. Cotter (politician) =

American politician (1926–1981)

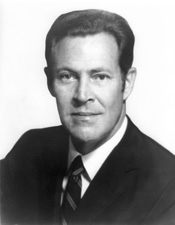

Member of the U.S. House of Representatives from Connecticut's 1st district
- In office January 3, 1971 – September 8, 1981
- Preceded by: Emilio Q. Daddario
- Succeeded by: Barbara B. Kennelly

Personal details
- Born: William Ross Cotter; July 18, 1926 Hartford, Connecticut, U.S.
- Died: September 8, 1981 (aged 55) East Lyme, Connecticut, U.S.
- Party: Democratic
- Education: Trinity College

William Ross Cotter (July 18, 1926 – September 8, 1981) was an American politician from Connecticut. A Democrat, he served in the United States House of Representatives for Connecticut's 1st congressional district from 1971 to 1981.

== Early life and education ==
He was born in Hartford, Connecticut and graduated from Trinity College in 1949.

== Career ==
In 1953, he was elected to the city's court of common council and from 1955 to 1957 served as an aide to Governor Abraham Ribicoff.

He then served as Connecticut's deputy insurance commissioner from 1957 to 1964 and as insurance commissioner from 1964 through 1970.

He was elected as a Democrat to the Ninety-second and to the five succeeding Congresses and served from January 3, 1971, until his death from pancreatic cancer at his sister's home in East Lyme, Connecticut, on September 8, 1981, aged 55.

== Legacy ==
In 1982, the William R. Cotter Federal Building at Hartford was named in his honor.

== See also ==
- List of members of the United States Congress who died in office (1950–1999)

U.S. House of Representatives
Preceded by Emilio Q. Daddario	Member of the U.S. House of Representatives from Connecticut's 1st congressional district 1971–1981	Succeeded by Barbara Kennelly
