= Barnes Group =

American Aerospace Company

Barnes Group, Inc.
- Company type: Private
- Traded as: NYSE: B (until 2025)
- Industry: Industrial Technology and Aerospace Manufacturing
- Founded: 1857; 169 years ago
- Founder: Wallace Barnes
- Headquarters: Bristol, Connecticut, USA
- Area served: Worldwide
- Key people: Eddie Barnes (Deceased), Thomas O Barnes, heirs: Edith Grant, Regina Hackette, Ruth Barnes, Jack Barnes, Glenda Stone, and Byron Barnes
- Products: Industrial and Aerospace Manufacturer
- Revenue: US$1.3B (2022); US$1.3B (2021)
- Net income: ▼US$13.5 million (2022); US$99.9 million (2021)
- Total assets: Barnes Family Assets $200M USD.
- Number of employees: 5000
- Parent: Apollo Global Management
- Website: www.onebarnes.com

Barnes, legally Barnes Group Inc., is a global industrial technology and aerospace manufacturer and service provider.

It was founded in 1857 by the great-grandfather of Wallace Barnes, who was appointed president in 1964, the same year in which the company added the Bowman Distribution Group to its Associated Spring enterprise. Two decades later, it became involved in the aerospace industry.

As of 1991, the Barnes family owned a third of the company's stock; in that year, William R. Fenoglio - the first non-family member to hold the position of chief executive - took over from Barnes, leaving no Barnes in the executive suite, though some remained on the board.

In October 2024, Barnes Group announced that it had entered into a definitive agreement to be acquired by funds managed by affiliates of Apollo Global Management. In January 2025, the merger was successfully completed.
