= List of new members of the 90th United States Congress =

The 90th United States Congress began on January 3, 1967. There were four new senators (all Republicans) and 71 new representatives (13 Democrats, 58 Republicans) at the start of the first session. Additionally, five senators (one Democrat, four Republicans) and six representatives (four Democrats, two Republicans) took office on various dates in order to fill vacancies during the 90th Congress before it ended on January 3, 1969.

Due to redistricting in multiple states, eight representatives were elected from newly created seats.

== Senate ==
=== Took office January 3, 1967 ===
State	Image	Senator	Seniority	Switched party	Prior background	Birth year	Ref
Illinois		Charles H. Percy (R)	2nd (97th overall)	Yes; Defeated Paul Douglas (D)	President of Bell & Howell; U.S. Navy Lieutenant	1919	
Massachusetts		Edward Brooke (R)	3rd (98th overall)	No; Open seat; replaced Leverett Saltonstall (R)	Massachusetts Attorney General; Chair of the Boston Finance Commission; U.S. Army Captain	1919	
Tennessee		Howard Baker (R)	4th (99th overall)	Yes; Replaced Ross Bass (D), who was defeated in a primary	Lawyer; U.S. Navy	1925	
Wyoming		Clifford Hansen (R)	1st (96th overall)	No; Open seat; replaced Milward Simpson (R)	Governor of Wyoming; Teton County Commissioner; University of Wyoming Board of Trustees	1912	

=== Took office during the 90th Congress ===
State	Image	Senator	Took office	Switched party	Prior background	Birth year	Ref
Oregon		Mark Hatfield (R)	January 10, 1967	Yes; Open seat; replaced Maurine Neuberger (D)	Governor of Oregon; Oregon Secretary of State; U.S. Navy Lieutenant	1922	
New York		Charles Goodell (R)	September 10, 1968	Yes; Appointed; replaced Robert F. Kennedy (D)	U.S. House of Representatives (Note: Elected during the 86th Congress, serving from 1959 to 1963 in New York's 43rd district and from 1963 to 1968 in the 38th district.); U.S. Air Force first lieutenant U.S. Navy seaman apprentice	1926	
Kentucky		Marlow Cook (R)	December 17, 1968	No; Open seat; replaced Thruston Ballard Morton (R)	Jefferson County Judge; Kentucky House of Representatives; U.S. Navy	1926	
Alaska		Ted Stevens (R)	December 24, 1968	Yes; Appointed; replaced Bob Bartlett (D)	Alaska House of Representatives; U.S. Assistant Secretary of the Interior; U.S. Attorney for Alaska Territory	1923	
Missouri		Thomas Eagleton (D)	December 28, 1968	No; Defeated Edward V. Long (D) in a primary	Lieutenant Governor of Missouri; Missouri Attorney General; U.S. Navy	1929	

== House of Representatives ==
=== Took office January 3, 1967 ===
District	Representative	Switched party	Prior background	Birth year	Ref
Alabama 4	Bill Nichols (R)	Yes	State Senator	1918	
Alabama 7	Tom Bevill (D)	Yes	State Representative	1921	
Alaska at-large	Howard Pollock (R)	Yes	State Senator	1920	
Arizona 3	Sam Steiger (R)	Yes	State Senator	1929	
Arkansas 3	John Paul Hammerschmidt (R)	Yes	State Party Chair	1922	
California 18	Bob Mathias (R)	Yes	Olympic decathlete	1930	
California 25	Charles E. Wiggins (R)	Yes	Mayor of El Monte	1927	
California 33	Jerry Pettis (R)	Yes	Businessman	1916	
Colorado 2	Donald G. Brotzman (R)	Yes	U.S. Representative (Note: Previously elected to the 88th Congress, serving from 1963 to 1965.)	1922	
Connecticut 6	Thomas Meskill (R)	Yes	Mayor of New Britain	1928	
Delaware at-large	William Roth (R)	Yes	State Party Chair	1921	
Florida 10	J. Herbert Burke (R)	New seat	County Commissioner	1913	
Georgia 3	Jack Brinkley (D)	Yes	State Representative	1930	
Georgia 4	Benjamin B. Blackburn (R)	Yes	U.S. Navy Lieutenant Commander	1927	
Georgia 5	Fletcher Thompson (R)	Yes	State Senator	1925	
Georgia 8	W. S. Stuckey Jr. (D)	No	Business executive	1935	
Idaho 1	Jim McClure (R)	Yes	State Senator	1924	
Illinois 19	Tom Railsback (R)	Yes	State Representative	1932	
Indiana 7	John T. Myers (R)	New seat	Farmer	1927	
Indiana 8	Roger H. Zion (R)	Yes	Businessman	1921	
Iowa 1	Fred Schwengel (R)	Yes	U.S. Representative (Note: Previously elected to the 84th Congress, serving from 1955 to 1965.)	1906	
Iowa 4	John Kyl (R)	Yes	U.S. Representative (Note: Previously elected during the 86th Congress, serving from 1959 to 1965.)	1919	
Iowa 6	Wiley Mayne (R)	Yes	Lawyer	1917	
Iowa 7	William J. Scherle (R)	Yes	State Representative	1923	
Kansas 3	Larry Winn (R)	No	NAHB director	1919	
Kentucky 3	William Cowger (R)	Yes	Mayor of Louisville	1922	
Kentucky 4	Gene Snyder (R)	Yes	U.S. Representative (Note: Previously elected to the 88th Congress, serving from 1963 to 1965 in the 3rd district.)	1928	
Louisiana 6	John Rarick (D)	No	District court judge	1924	
Maine 1	Peter Kyros (D)	Yes	Legal counsel	1925	
Maryland 8	Gilbert Gude (R)	New seat	State Senator	1923	
Massachusetts 10	Margaret Heckler (R)	No	Governor's Councilor	1931	
Michigan 2	Marvin L. Esch (R)	Yes	State Representative	1927	
Michigan 3	Garry E. Brown (R)	Yes	State Senate Minority Leader	1923	
Michigan 7	Donald Riegle (R)	Yes (Note: Riegle joined the Democratic Party in February 1973, during the 93rd Congress.)	Businessman	1938	
Michigan 11	Philip Ruppe (R)	Yes	U.S. Navy Lieutenant	1926	
Michigan 19	Jack H. McDonald (R)	Yes	County Commissioner	1932	
Minnesota 6	John M. Zwach (R)	Yes	State Senate Majority Leader	1907	
Mississippi 4	Sonny Montgomery (D)	Yes	State Senator	1920	
Nebraska 1	Robert V. Denney (R)	Yes	State Party Chair	1916	
New Hampshire 1	Louis C. Wyman (R)	Yes	U.S. Representative (Note: Previously elected to the 88th Congress, serving from 1963 to 1965.)	1917	
New Jersey 1	John E. Hunt (R)	New seat	State Senator	1908	
New Jersey 2	Charles W. Sandman Jr. (R)	Yes	State Senator	1921	
New York 11	Frank J. Brasco (D)	No	Attorney	1932	
New York 29	Daniel E. Button (R)	Yes	Newspaper editor	1917	
North Carolina 4	Jim Gardner (R)	Yes	State Party Chair	1933	
North Carolina 5	Nick Galifianakis (D)	No	State Representative	1928	
North Dakota 2	Thomas S. Kleppe (R)	Yes	Mayor of Bismarck	1919	
Ohio 1	Robert Taft Jr. (R)	Yes	U.S. Representative (Note: Previously elected to the 88th Congress, serving from 1963 to 1965 in the at-large district.)	1917	
Ohio 3	Charles W. Whalen Jr. (R)	Yes	State Senator	1920	
Ohio 10	Clarence E. Miller (R)	Yes	Mayor of Lancaster	1917	
Ohio 15	Chalmers Wylie (R)	New seat	State Representative	1920	
Ohio 24	Buz Lukens (R)	Yes	Congressional staffer	1931	
Oklahoma 6	James Vernon Smith (R)	Yes	Farmer	1926	
Oregon 4	John R. Dellenback (R)	Yes	State Representative	1918	
Pennsylvania 4	Joshua Eilberg (D)	No	State Representative	1921	
Pennsylvania 7	Lawrence G. Williams (R)	New seat	Township Board President	1913	
Pennsylvania 8	Edward G. Biester Jr. (R)	No	Assistant district attorney	1931	
Pennsylvania 16	Edwin D. Eshleman (R)	No	State Representative	1920	
Pennsylvania 19	George A. Goodling (R)	Yes	U.S. Representative (Note: Previously elected to the 87th Congress, serving from 1961 to 1965.)	1896	
Tennessee 7	Ray Blanton (D)	No	State Representative	1930	
Tennessee 9	Dan Kuykendall (R)	Yes	Business executive	1924	
Texas 7	George H. W. Bush (R)	New seat	Oil business founder	1924	
Texas 8	Bob Eckhardt (D)	No	State Representative	1913	
Texas 18	Bob Price (R)	Yes	U.S. Air Force veteran	1927	
Texas 23	Abraham Kazen (D)	New seat	State Senator	1919	
Utah 2	Sherman P. Lloyd (R)	Yes	U.S. Representative (Note: Previously elected to the 88th Congress, serving from 1963 to 1965.)	1914	
Virginia 8	William L. Scott (R)	Yes	DOJ attorney	1915	
Virginia 9	William C. Wampler (R)	Yes	U.S. Representative (Note: Previously elected to the 83rd Congress, serving from 1953 to 1955.)	1926	
Wisconsin 1	Henry C. Schadeberg (R)	Yes	U.S. Representative (Note: Previously elected to the 87th Congress, serving from 1961 to 1965.)	1913	
Wisconsin 6	William A. Steiger (R)	Yes	State Assemblyman	1938	
Wyoming at-large	William Henry Harrison III (R)	Yes	U.S. Representative (Note: Previously elected to the 82nd Congress, serving from 1951 to 1955; elected again to the 87th Congress, serving from 1961 to 1965.)	1896	

=== Took office during the 90th Congress ===
District	Representative	Took office	Switched party	Prior background	Birth year	Ref
Rhode Island 2	Robert Tiernan (D)	March 28, 1967	No	State Senator	1929	
California 11	Pete McCloskey (R)	December 12, 1967	No	Deputy district attorney	1927	
New York 13	Bertram L. Podell (D)	February 20, 1968	No	State Assemblyman	1925	
Mississippi 3	Charles H. Griffin (D)	March 12, 1968	No	Congressional aide	1926	
Texas 3	James M. Collins (R)	August 24, 1968	Yes	Business executive	1916	
Pennsylvania 20	Joseph M. Gaydos (D)	November 5, 1968	No	State Senator	1926	

== See also ==
- List of United States representatives in the 90th Congress
- List of United States senators in the 90th Congress

== Notes ==
Preceded by New members of the 89th Congress	New members of the 90th Congress; 1967–1969	Succeeded by New members of the 91st Congress
