= List of United States representatives in the 90th Congress =

This is a complete list of United States representatives during the 90th United States Congress listed by seniority.

As an historical article, the districts and party affiliations listed reflect those during the 90th Congress (January 3, 1967 – January 3, 1969). Seats and party affiliations on similar lists for other congresses will be different for certain members.

Seniority depends on the date on which members were sworn into office. Since many members are sworn in on the same day, subsequent ranking is based on previous congressional service of the individual and then by alphabetical order by the last name of the representative.

Committee chairmanship in the House is often associated with seniority. However, party leadership is typically not associated with seniority.

Note: The "*" indicates that the representative/delegate may have served one or more non-consecutive terms while in the House of Representatives of the United States Congress.

== U.S. House seniority list ==
U.S. House seniority
Rank	Representative	Party	District	Seniority date (Previous service, if any)	No.# of term(s)	Notes
1	Emanuel Celler	D	NY-10	March 4, 1923	23rd term	Dean of the House
2	John William McCormack	D	MA-09	November 6, 1928	21st term	Speaker of the House
3	Wright Patman	D	TX-01	March 4, 1929	20th term	
4	William M. Colmer	D	MS-05	March 4, 1933	18th term	
5	Leslie C. Arends	R	IL-17	January 3, 1935	17th term	
6	George H. Mahon	D	TX-19	January 3, 1935	17th term	
7	Charles A. Halleck	R	IN-02	January 29, 1935	17th term	Left the House in 1969.
8	Michael J. Kirwan	D	OH-19	January 3, 1937	16th term	
9	William R. Poage	D	TX-11	January 3, 1937	16th term	
10	Ezekiel C. Gathings	D	AR-01	January 3, 1939	15th term	Left the House in 1969.
11	John L. McMillan	D	SC-06	January 3, 1939	15th term	
12	Wilbur Mills	D	AR-02	January 3, 1939	15th term	
13	Frances P. Bolton	R	OH-22	February 27, 1940	15th term	Left the House in 1969.
14	Felix Edward Hébert	D	LA-01	January 3, 1941	14th term	
15	L. Mendel Rivers	D	SC-01	January 3, 1941	14th term	
16	Jamie Whitten	D	MS-02	November 4, 1941	14th term	
17	Cecil R. King	D	CA-17	August 25, 1942	14th term	Left the House in 1969.
18	Thomas Abernethy	D	MS-01	January 3, 1943	13th term	
19	William L. Dawson	D	IL-01	January 3, 1943	13th term	
20	Michael A. Feighan	D	OH-20	January 3, 1943	13th term	
21	O. C. Fisher	D	TX-21	January 3, 1943	13th term	
22	Chester E. Holifield	D	CA-19	January 3, 1943	13th term	
23	Ray Madden	D	IN-01	January 3, 1943	13th term	
24	Alvin O'Konski	R	WI-10	January 3, 1943	13th term	
25	Philip J. Philbin	D	MA-03	January 3, 1943	13th term	
26	George W. Andrews	D	AL-03	March 14, 1944	13th term	
27	John J. Rooney	D	NY-14	June 6, 1944	13th term	
28	John W. Byrnes	R	WI-08	January 3, 1945	12th term	
29	Robert J. Corbett	R	PA-18	January 3, 1945; Previous service, 1939–1941.	13th term*	
30	George Hyde Fallon	D	MD-04	January 3, 1945	12th term	
31	James G. Fulton	R	PA-27	January 3, 1945	12th term	
32	George Paul Miller	D	CA-08	January 3, 1945	12th term	
33	Thomas E. Morgan	D	PA-26	January 3, 1945	12th term	
34	Adam Clayton Powell Jr.	D	NY-18	January 3, 1945	12th term	
35	Charles Melvin Price	D	IL-24	January 3, 1945	12th term	
36	Robert L. F. Sikes	D	FL-01	January 3, 1945; Previous service, 1941–1944.	14th term*	
37	John E. Fogarty	D	RI-02	February 7, 1945; Previous service, 1941–1944	14th term*	Died on January 10, 1967.
38	Olin E. Teague	D	TX-06	August 24, 1946	12th term	
39	Carl Albert	D	OK-03	January 3, 1947	11th term	
40	John Blatnik	D	MN-08	January 3, 1947	11th term	
41	Hale Boggs	D	LA-02	January 3, 1947; Previous service, 1941–1943.	12th term*	
42	Omar Burleson	D	TX-17	January 3, 1947	11th term	
43	Harold Donohue	D	MA-04	January 3, 1947	11th term	
44	Joe L. Evins	D	TN-04	January 3, 1947	11th term	
45	Porter Hardy Jr.	D	VA-02	January 3, 1947	11th term	Left the House in 1969.
46	Frank M. Karsten	D	MO-01	January 3, 1947	11th term	Left the House in 1969.
47	Otto Passman	D	LA-05	January 3, 1947	11th term	
48	John Bell Williams	D	MS-03	January 3, 1947	11th term	Resigned on January 16, 1968.
49	Robert E. Jones Jr.	D	AL-08	January 28, 1947	11th term	
50	Edward Garmatz	D	MD-03	July 15, 1947	11th term	
51	William Moore McCulloch	R	OH-04	November 4, 1947	11th term	
52	Abraham J. Multer	D	NY-13	November 4, 1947	11th term	Resigned on December 31, 1967.
53	Watkins Moorman Abbitt	D	VA-04	February 17, 1948	11th term	
54	Paul C. Jones	D	MO-10	November 2, 1948	11th term	Left the House in 1969.
55	Wayne N. Aspinall	D	CO-04	January 3, 1949	10th term	
56	William A. Barrett	D	PA-01	January 3, 1949; Previous service, 1945–1947.	11th term*	
57	Charles Edward Bennett	D	FL-03	January 3, 1949	10th term	
58	Richard Walker Bolling	D	MO-05	January 3, 1949	10th term	
59	James J. Delaney	D	NY-09	January 3, 1949; Previous service, 1945–1947.	11th term*	
60	Gerald Ford	R	MI-05	January 3, 1949	10th term	
61	H. R. Gross	R	IA-03	January 3, 1949	10th term	
62	Wayne Hays	D	OH-18	January 3, 1949	10th term	
63	Albert S. Herlong Jr.	D	FL-04	January 3, 1949	10th term	Left the House in 1969.
64	Carl D. Perkins	D	KY-07	January 3, 1949	10th term	
65	George M. Rhodes	D	PA-06	January 3, 1949	10th term	Left the House in 1969.
66	Peter W. Rodino	D	NJ-10	January 3, 1949	10th term	
67	Harley Orrin Staggers	D	WV-02	January 3, 1949	10th term	
68	Tom Steed	D	OK-04	January 3, 1949	10th term	
69	Edwin E. Willis	D	LA-03	January 3, 1949	10th term	Left the House in 1969.
70	Clement J. Zablocki	D	WI-04	January 3, 1949	10th term	
71	John P. Saylor	R	PA-22	September 13, 1949	10th term	
72	Edna F. Kelly	D	NY-12	November 8, 1949	10th term	Left the House in 1969.
73	William B. Widnall	R	NJ-07	February 6, 1950	10th term	
74	William H. Bates	R	MA-06	February 14, 1950	10th term	
75	E. Ross Adair	R	IN-04	January 3, 1951	9th term	
76	William Hanes Ayres	R	OH-14	January 3, 1951	9th term	
77	Page Belcher	R	OK-01	January 3, 1951	9th term	
78	Ellis Yarnal Berry	R	SD-02	January 3, 1951	9th term	
79	Jackson Edward Betts	R	OH-08	January 3, 1951	9th term	
80	Frank T. Bow	R	OH-16	January 3, 1951	9th term	
81	William G. Bray	R	IN-06	January 3, 1951	9th term	
82	Thomas B. Curtis	R	MO-02	January 3, 1951	9th term	Left the House in 1969.
83	William Jennings Bryan Dorn	D	SC-03	January 3, 1951; Previous service, 1947–1949.	10th term*	
84	John Jarman	D	OK-05	January 3, 1951	9th term	
85	John C. Kluczynski	D	IL-05	January 3, 1951	9th term	
86	Byron G. Rogers	D	CO-01	January 3, 1951	9th term	
87	William L. Springer	R	IL-22	January 3, 1951	9th term	
88	John C. Watts	D	KY-06	April 4, 1951	9th term	
89	John Dowdy	D	TX-02	September 23, 1952	9th term	
90	Edward Boland	D	MA-02	January 3, 1953	8th term	
91	Jack Brooks	D	TX-09	January 3, 1953	8th term	
92	Joel Broyhill	R	VA-10	January 3, 1953	8th term	
93	James A. Byrne	D	PA-03	January 3, 1953	8th term	
94	Elford Albin Cederberg	R	MI-10	January 3, 1953	8th term	
95	Ed Edmondson	D	OK-02	January 3, 1953	8th term	
96	Paul A. Fino	R	NY-24	January 3, 1953	8th term	Resigned on December 31, 1968.
97	Lawrence H. Fountain	D	NC-02	January 3, 1953	8th term	
98	Peter Frelinghuysen Jr.	R	NJ-05	January 3, 1953	8th term	
99	Samuel Friedel	D	MD-07	January 3, 1953	8th term	
100	Charles S. Gubser	R	CA-10	January 3, 1953	8th term	
101	James A. Haley	D	FL-07	January 3, 1953	8th term	
102	Barratt O'Hara	D	IL-02	January 3, 1953; Previous service, 1949–1951.	9th term*	Left the House in 1969.
103	Craig Hosmer	R	CA-32	January 3, 1953	8th term	
104	Charles R. Jonas	R	NC-08	January 3, 1953	8th term	
105	Melvin Laird	R	WI-07	January 3, 1953	8th term	
106	Phillip M. Landrum	D	GA-09	January 3, 1953	8th term	
107	William S. Mailliard	R	CA-06	January 3, 1953	8th term	
108	John E. Moss	D	CA-03	January 3, 1953	8th term	
109	Tip O'Neill	D	MA-08	January 3, 1953	8th term	
110	Thomas Pelly	R	WA-01	January 3, 1953	8th term	
111	Richard Harding Poff	R	VA-06	January 3, 1953	8th term	
112	John J. Rhodes	R	AZ-01	January 3, 1953	8th term	
113	Armistead I. Selden Jr.	D	AL-05	January 3, 1953	8th term	Left the House in 1969.
114	Leonor Sullivan	D	MO-03	January 3, 1953	8th term	
115	James B. Utt	R	CA-35	January 3, 1953	8th term	
116	Bob Wilson	R	CA-36	January 3, 1953	8th term	
117	J. Arthur Younger	R	CA-11	January 3, 1953	8th term	Died on June 20, 1967.
118	William M. Tuck	D	VA-05	April 14, 1953	8th term	Left the House in 1969.
119	Robert T. Ashmore	D	SC-04	June 2, 1953	8th term	Left the House in 1969.
120	William Natcher	D	KY-02	August 1, 1953	8th term	
121	Glenard P. Lipscomb	R	CA-24	November 10, 1953	8th term	
122	John James Flynt Jr.	D	GA-06	November 2, 1954	8th term	
123	Thomas W. L. Ashley	D	OH-09	January 3, 1955	7th term	
124	Frank M. Clark	D	PA-25	January 3, 1955	7th term	
125	William C. Cramer	R	FL-08	January 3, 1955	7th term	
126	Charles Diggs	D	MI-13	January 3, 1955	7th term	
127	Dante Fascell	D	FL-12	January 3, 1955	7th term	
128	Daniel J. Flood	D	PA-11	January 3, 1955; Previous service, 1945–1947 and 1949–1953.	10th term**	
129	Kenneth J. Gray	D	IL-21	January 3, 1955	7th term	
130	Edith Green	D	OR-03	January 3, 1955	7th term	
131	Martha Griffiths	D	MI-17	January 3, 1955	7th term	
132	William Raleigh Hull Jr.	D	MO-06	January 3, 1955	7th term	
133	Torbert Macdonald	D	MA-07	January 3, 1955	7th term	
134	William Edwin Minshall Jr.	R	OH-23	January 3, 1955	7th term	
135	Henry S. Reuss	D	WI-05	January 3, 1955	7th term	
136	Bernice F. Sisk	D	CA-16	January 3, 1955	7th term	
137	Charles M. Teague	R	CA-13	January 3, 1955	7th term	
138	Frank Thompson	D	NJ-04	January 3, 1955	7th term	
139	Charles Vanik	D	OH-21	January 3, 1955	7th term	
140	Jim Wright	D	TX-12	January 3, 1955	7th term	
141	Paul Rogers	D	FL-09	January 11, 1955	7th term	
142	John Dingell	D	MI-16	December 13, 1955	7th term	
143	Elmer J. Holland	D	PA-20	January 24, 1956; Previous service, 1942–1943.	8th term*	Died on August 9, 1968.
144	Walter S. Baring Jr.	D	NV	January 3, 1957; Previous service, 1949–1953.	8th term*	
145	William Broomfield	R	MI-18	January 3, 1957	6th term	
146	Charles E. Chamberlain	R	MI-06	January 3, 1957	6th term	
147	Harold R. Collier	R	IL-10	January 3, 1957	6th term	
148	Glenn Cunningham	R	NE-02	January 3, 1957	6th term	
149	Florence P. Dwyer	R	NJ-12	January 3, 1957	6th term	
150	Leonard Farbstein	D	NY-19	January 3, 1957	6th term	
151	Alton Lennon	D	NC-07	January 3, 1957	6th term	
152	John J. McFall	D	CA-15	January 3, 1957	6th term	
153	Robert Michel	R	IL-18	January 3, 1957	6th term	
154	Arch A. Moore Jr.	R	WV-01	January 3, 1957	6th term	Left the House in 1969.
155	H. Allen Smith	R	CA-20	January 3, 1957	6th term	
156	Al Ullman	D	OR-02	January 3, 1957	6th term	
157	Basil Lee Whitener	D	NC-10	January 3, 1957	6th term	Left the House in 1969.
158	John Andrew Young	D	TX-14	January 3, 1957	6th term	
159	Howard W. Robison	R	NY-33	January 14, 1958	6th term	
160	John Herman Dent	D	PA-21	January 21, 1958	6th term	
161	Fats Everett	D	TN-08	February 1, 1958	6th term	
162	Al Quie	R	MN-01	February 18, 1958	6th term	
163	Robert N.C. Nix Sr.	D	PA-02	May 20, 1958	6th term	
164	John Brademas	D	IN-03	January 3, 1959	5th term	
165	James A. Burke	D	MA-11	January 3, 1959	5th term	
166	William T. Cahill	R	NJ-06	January 3, 1959	5th term	
167	Robert R. Casey	D	TX-22	January 3, 1959	5th term	
168	Jeffery Cohelan	D	CA-07	January 3, 1959	5th term	
169	Silvio O. Conte	R	MA-01	January 3, 1959	5th term	
170	Emilio Q. Daddario	D	CT-01	January 3, 1959	5th term	
171	Dominick V. Daniels	D	NJ-14	January 3, 1959	5th term	
172	Ed Derwinski	R	IL-04	January 3, 1959	5th term	
173	Samuel L. Devine	R	OH-12	January 3, 1959	5th term	
174	Thomas N. Downing	D	VA-01	January 3, 1959	5th term	
175	Thaddeus J. Dulski	D	NY-41	January 3, 1959	5th term	
176	Cornelius Edward Gallagher	D	NJ-13	January 3, 1959	5th term	
177	Robert Giaimo	D	CT-03	January 3, 1959	5th term	
178	Seymour Halpern	R	NY-06	January 3, 1959	5th term	
179	Ken Hechler	D	WV-04	January 3, 1959	5th term	
180	Harold T. Johnson	D	CA-02	January 3, 1959	5th term	
181	Joseph Karth	D	MN-04	January 3, 1959	5th term	
182	Robert Kastenmeier	D	WI-02	January 3, 1959	5th term	
183	Hastings Keith	R	MA-12	January 3, 1959	5th term	
184	Odin Langen	R	MN-07	January 3, 1959	5th term	
185	Del Latta	R	OH-05	January 3, 1959	5th term	
186	Catherine Dean May	R	WA-04	January 3, 1959	5th term	
187	John S. Monagan	D	CT-05	January 3, 1959	5th term	
188	William S. Moorhead	D	PA-14	January 3, 1959	5th term	
189	Thomas G. Morris	D	NM	January 3, 1959	5th term	Left the House in 1969.
190	William T. Murphy	D	IL-03	January 3, 1959	5th term	
191	Ancher Nelsen	R	MN-02	January 3, 1959	5th term	
192	James G. O'Hara	D	MI-12	January 3, 1959	5th term	
193	Alexander Pirnie	R	NY-32	January 3, 1959	5th term	
194	Roman C. Pucinski	D	IL-11	January 3, 1959	5th term	
195	Dan Rostenkowski	D	IL-08	January 3, 1959	5th term	
196	J. Edward Roush	D	IN-05	January 3, 1959	5th term	Left the House in 1969.
197	John M. Slack Jr.	D	WV-03	January 3, 1959	5th term	
198	Samuel S. Stratton	D	NY-35	January 3, 1959	5th term	
199	Frank Stubblefield	D	KY-01	January 3, 1959	5th term	
200	George E. Shipley	D	IL-23	January 3, 1959	5th term	
201	Neal Smith	D	IA-05	January 3, 1959	5th term	
202	William J. Randall	D	MO-04	March 3, 1959	5th term	
203	Charles Goodell	R	NY-38	May 26, 1959	5th term	Resigned on September 9, 1968.
204	Jacob H. Gilbert	D	NY-22	March 8, 1960	5th term	
205	Herman T. Schneebeli	R	PA-17	April 26, 1960	5th term	
206	Roy A. Taylor	D	NC-11	June 25, 1960	5th term	
207	Julia Butler Hansen	D	WA-03	November 8, 1960	5th term	
208	J. Irving Whalley	R	PA-12	November 8, 1960	5th term	
209	Joseph Patrick Addabbo	D	NY-07	January 3, 1961	4th term	
210	John B. Anderson	R	IL-16	January 3, 1961	4th term	
211	John M. Ashbrook	R	OH-17	January 3, 1961	4th term	
212	James F. Battin	R	MT-02	January 3, 1961	4th term	
213	Alphonzo E. Bell Jr.	R	CA-28	January 3, 1961	4th term	
214	Hugh Carey	D	NY-15	January 3, 1961	4th term	
215	Donald D. Clancy	R	OH-02	January 3, 1961	4th term	
216	James C. Corman	D	CA-22	January 3, 1961	4th term	
217	Bob Dole	R	KS-01	January 3, 1961	4th term	Left the House in 1969.
218	John W. Davis	D	GA-07	January 3, 1961	4th term	
219	Paul Findley	R	IL-20	January 3, 1961	4th term	
220	Fernand St. Germain	D	RI-01	January 3, 1961	4th term	
221	George Elliott Hagan	D	GA-01	January 3, 1961	4th term	
222	Durward Gorham Hall	R	MO-07	January 3, 1961	4th term	
223	Bill Harsha	R	OH-06	January 3, 1961	4th term	
224	R. James Harvey	R	MI-08	January 3, 1961	4th term	
225	David N. Henderson	D	NC-03	January 3, 1961	4th term	
226	Richard Howard Ichord Jr.	D	MO-08	January 3, 1961	4th term	
227	Charles Samuel Joelson	D	NJ-08	January 3, 1961	4th term	
228	Carleton J. King	R	NY-30	January 3, 1961	4th term	
229	Horace R. Kornegay	D	NC-06	January 3, 1961	4th term	Left the House in 1969.
230	Clark MacGregor	R	MN-03	January 3, 1961	4th term	
231	David Martin	R	NE-03	January 3, 1961	4th term	
232	Charles Mathias	D	MD-06	January 3, 1961	4th term	Left the House in 1969.
233	Charles Adams Mosher	R	OH-13	January 3, 1961	4th term	
234	F. Bradford Morse	R	MA-05	January 3, 1961	4th term	
235	Arnold Olsen	D	MT-01	January 3, 1961	4th term	
236	Otis G. Pike	D	NY-01	January 3, 1961	4th term	
237	Ben Reifel	R	SD-01	January 3, 1961	4th term	
238	Richard L. Roudebush	R	IN-10	January 3, 1961	4th term	
239	William Fitts Ryan	D	NY-20	January 3, 1961	4th term	
240	Richard Schweiker	R	PA-13	January 3, 1961	4th term	Left the House in 1969.
241	Garner E. Shriver	R	KS-04	January 3, 1961	4th term	
242	Robert Stafford	R	VT	January 3, 1961	4th term	
243	Robert Grier Stephens Jr.	D	GA-10	January 3, 1961	4th term	
244	Vernon Wallace Thomson	R	WI-03	January 3, 1961	4th term	
245	Mo Udall	D	AZ-02	May 2, 1961	4th term	
246	Henry B. González	D	TX-20	November 4, 1961	4th term	
247	Lucien N. Nedzi	D	MI-14	November 7, 1961	4th term	
248	Joe Waggonner	D	LA-04	December 19, 1961	4th term	
249	Graham B. Purcell Jr.	D	TX-13	January 27, 1962	4th term	
250	Ray Roberts	D	TX-04	January 30, 1962	4th term	
251	Benjamin S. Rosenthal	D	NY-08	February 20, 1962	4th term	
252	Bill Brock	R	TN-03	January 3, 1963	3rd term	
253	George Brown Jr.	D	CA-29	January 3, 1963	3rd term	
254	Jim Broyhill	R	NC-09	January 3, 1963	3rd term	
255	Laurence J. Burton	R	UT-01	January 3, 1963	3rd term	
256	James Colgate Cleveland	R	NH-02	January 3, 1963	3rd term	
257	Lionel Van Deerlin	D	CA-37	January 3, 1963	3rd term	
258	Don Edwards	D	CA-09	January 3, 1963	3rd term	
259	Donald M. Fraser	D	MN-05	January 3, 1963	3rd term	
260	Richard Fulton	D	TN-05	January 3, 1963	3rd term	
261	Don Fuqua	D	FL-02	January 3, 1963	3rd term	
262	Sam Gibbons	D	FL-06	January 3, 1963	3rd term	
263	James R. Grover	R	NY-02	January 3, 1963	3rd term	
264	Edward Gurney	R	FL-05	January 3, 1963	3rd term	Left the House in 1969.
265	Richard T. Hanna	D	CA-34	January 3, 1963	3rd term	
266	Augustus F. Hawkins	D	CA-21	January 3, 1963	3rd term	
267	Frank Horton	R	NY-36	January 3, 1963	3rd term	
268	J. Edward Hutchinson	R	MI-04	January 3, 1963	3rd term	
269	Robert L. Leggett	D	CA-04	January 3, 1963	3rd term	
270	Clarence Long	D	MD-02	January 3, 1963	3rd term	
271	John Otho Marsh Jr.	D	VA-07	January 3, 1963	3rd term	
272	Spark Matsunaga	D	HI	January 3, 1963	3rd term	
273	Robert McClory	R	IL-12	January 3, 1963	3rd term	
274	Joseph McDade	R	PA-10	January 3, 1963	3rd term	
275	Joseph Minish	D	NJ-11	January 3, 1963	3rd term	
276	Rogers Morton	R	MD-01	January 3, 1963	3rd term	
277	John M. Murphy	D	NY-16	January 3, 1963	3rd term	
278	William St. Onge	D	CT-02	January 3, 1963	3rd term	
279	Edward J. Patten	D	NJ-15	January 3, 1963	3rd term	
280	Claude Pepper	D	FL-11	January 3, 1963	3rd term	
281	Joe R. Pool	D	TX-03	January 3, 1963	3rd term	Died on July 14, 1968.
282	Jimmy Quillen	R	TN-01	January 3, 1963	3rd term	
283	Charlotte Thompson Reid	R	IL-15	January 3, 1963	3rd term	
284	Ogden Reid	R	NY-26	January 3, 1963	3rd term	
285	Edward R. Roybal	D	CA-30	January 3, 1963	3rd term	
286	Donald Rumsfeld	R	IL-13	January 3, 1963	3rd term	
287	Joe Skubitz	R	KS-05	January 3, 1963	3rd term	
288	Burt L. Talcott	R	CA-12	January 3, 1963	3rd term	
289	Charles H. Wilson	D	CA-31	January 3, 1963	3rd term	
290	John W. Wydler	R	NY-04	January 3, 1963	3rd term	
291	Don H. Clausen	R	CA-01	January 22, 1963	3rd term	
292	Del M. Clawson	R	CA-23	June 11, 1963	3rd term	
293	Fred B. Rooney	D	PA-15	July 30, 1963	3rd term	
294	Mark Andrews	R	ND-01	October 22, 1963	3rd term	
295	Albert W. Johnson	R	PA-23	November 5, 1963	3rd term	
296	J. J. Pickle	D	TX-10	December 21, 1963	3rd term	
297	Phillip Burton	D	CA-05	February 18, 1964	3rd term	
298	William J. Green, III	D	PA-05	April 28, 1964	3rd term	
299	Thomas S. Gettys	D	SC-05	November 3, 1964	3rd term	
300	William L. Hungate	D	MO-09	November 3, 1964	3rd term	
301	Wendell Wyatt	R	OR-01	November 3, 1964	3rd term	
302	Brock Adams	D	WA-07	January 3, 1965	2nd term	
303	William Anderson	D	TN-06	January 3, 1965	2nd term	
304	Frank Annunzio	D	IL-07	January 3, 1965	2nd term	
305	Jonathan Brewster Bingham	D	NY-23	January 3, 1965	2nd term	
306	John Hall Buchanan Jr.	R	AL-06	January 3, 1965	2nd term	
307	Earle Cabell	D	TX-05	January 3, 1965	2nd term	
308	Tim Lee Carter	R	KY-05	January 3, 1965	2nd term	
309	Barber Conable	R	NY-37	January 3, 1965	2nd term	
310	John Conyers	D	MI-01	January 3, 1965	2nd term	
311	John Culver	D	IA-02	January 3, 1965	2nd term	
312	Glenn Robert Davis	R	WI-09	January 3, 1965; Previous service, 1947–1957.	7th term*	
313	Bill Dickinson	R	AL-02	January 3, 1965	2nd term	
314	John Duncan Sr.	R	TN-02	January 3, 1965	2nd term	
315	John G. Dow	D	NY-27	January 3, 1965	2nd term	Left the House in 1969.
316	Jack Edwards	R	AL-01	January 3, 1965	2nd term	
317	John N. Erlenborn	R	IL-14	January 3, 1965	2nd term	
318	Frank Evans	D	CO-03	January 3, 1965	2nd term	
319	Tom Foley	D	WA-05	January 3, 1965	2nd term	
320	William Ford	D	MI-15	January 3, 1965	2nd term	
321	Kika De la Garza	D	TX-15	January 3, 1965	2nd term	
322	Lee Hamilton	D	IN-09	January 3, 1965	2nd term	
323	James M. Hanley	D	NY-34	January 3, 1965	2nd term	
324	George V. Hansen	R	ID-02	January 3, 1965	2nd term	Left the House in 1969.
325	William Hathaway	D	ME-02	January 3, 1965	2nd term	
326	Henry Helstoski	D	NJ-09	January 3, 1965	2nd term	
327	Floyd Hicks	D	WA-06	January 3, 1965	2nd term	
328	James J. Howard	D	NJ-03	January 3, 1965	2nd term	
329	Donald J. Irwin	D	CT-04	January 3, 1965; Previous service, 1959–1961.	3rd term*	Left the House in 1969.
330	Andrew Jacobs Jr.	D	IN-11	January 3, 1965	2nd term	
331	James Kee	D	WV-05	January 3, 1965	2nd term	
332	Speedy O. Long	D	LA-08	January 3, 1965	2nd term	
333	Hervey Machen	D	MD-05	January 3, 1965	2nd term	Left the House in 1969.
334	Richard D. McCarthy	D	NY-39	January 3, 1965	2nd term	
335	Robert C. McEwen	R	NY-31	January 3, 1965	2nd term	
336	Lloyd Meeds	D	WA-02	January 3, 1965	2nd term	
337	Patsy Mink	D	HI	January 3, 1965	2nd term	
338	Chester L. Mize	R	KS-02	January 3, 1965	2nd term	
339	Maston E. O'Neal Jr.	D	GA-02	January 3, 1965	2nd term	
340	Richard Ottinger	D	NY-25	January 3, 1965	2nd term	
341	Edwin Reinecke	R	CA-27	January 3, 1965	2nd term	
342	Joseph Y. Resnick	D	NY-28	January 3, 1965	2nd term	Left the House in 1969.
343	Daniel J. Ronan	D	IL-06	January 3, 1965	2nd term	
344	David E. Satterfield III	D	VA-03	January 3, 1965	2nd term	
345	James H. Scheuer	D	NY-21	January 3, 1965	2nd term	
346	Henry P. Smith III	R	NY-40	January 3, 1965	2nd term	
347	J. William Stanton	R	OH-11	January 3, 1965	2nd term	
348	Herbert Tenzer	D	NY-05	January 3, 1965	2nd term	Left the House in 1969.
349	John V. Tunney	D	CA-38	January 3, 1965	2nd term	
350	Joseph P. Vigorito	D	PA-24	January 3, 1965	2nd term	
351	E. S. Johnny Walker	D	NM	January 3, 1965	2nd term	Left the House in 1969.
352	George Watkins	R	PA-09	January 3, 1965	2nd term	
353	Richard Crawford White	D	TX-16	January 3, 1965	2nd term	
354	Lester L. Wolff	D	NY-03	January 3, 1965	2nd term	
355	Sidney Yates	D	IL-09	January 3, 1965; Previous service, 1949–1963.	9th term*	
356	Albert Watson	R	SC-02	June 15, 1965; Previous service, 1963–1965.	4th term*	
357	Edwin Edwards	D	LA-07	October 2, 1965	2nd term	
358	Clarence E. Brown Jr.	R	OH-07	November 2, 1965	2nd term	
359	Thomas M. Rees	D	CA-26	December 15, 1965	2nd term	
360	Walter B. Jones Sr.	D	NC-01	February 5, 1966	2nd term	
361	Theodore R. Kupferman	R	NY-17	February 8, 1966	2nd term	Left the House in 1969.
362	Jerome R. Waldie	D	CA-14	June 7, 1966	2nd term	
363	Guy Vander Jagt	R	MI-09	November 8, 1966	2nd term	
364	David Pryor	D	AR-04	November 8, 1966	2nd term	
365	Tom Bevill	D	AL-07	January 3, 1967	1st term	
366	Edward G. Biester Jr.	R	PA-08	January 3, 1967	1st term	
367	Benjamin B. Blackburn	R	GA-04	January 3, 1967	1st term	
368	Ray Blanton	D	TN-07	January 3, 1967	1st term	
369	Frank J. Brasco	D	NY-11	January 3, 1967	1st term	
370	Jack Thomas Brinkley	D	GA-03	January 3, 1967	1st term	
371	Donald G. Brotzman	R	CO-02	January 3, 1967; Previous service, 1963–1965.	2nd term*	
372	Garry E. Brown	R	MI-03	January 3, 1967	1st term	
373	J. Herbert Burke	R	FL-10	January 3, 1967	1st term	
374	George H. W. Bush	R	TX-07	January 3, 1967	1st term	
375	Daniel E. Button	R	NY-29	January 3, 1967	1st term	
376	William O. Cowger	R	KY-03	January 3, 1967	1st term	
377	John R. Dellenback	R	OR-04	January 3, 1967	1st term	
378	Robert Vernon Denney	R	NE-01	January 3, 1967	1st term	
379	Robert C. Eckhardt	D	TX-08	January 3, 1967	1st term	
380	Joshua Eilberg	D	PA-04	January 3, 1967	1st term	
381	Marvin L. Esch	R	MI-02	January 3, 1967	1st term	
382	Edwin Duing Eshleman	R	PA-16	January 3, 1967	1st term	
383	Nick Galifianakis	D	NC-05	January 3, 1967	1st term	
384	James Carson Gardner	R	NC-04	January 3, 1967	1st term	Left the House in 1969.
385	George Atlee Goodling	R	PA-19	January 3, 1967; Previous service, 1961–1965.	3rd term*	
386	Gilbert Gude	R	MD-08	January 3, 1967	1st term	
387	John Paul Hammerschmidt	R	AR-03	January 3, 1967	1st term	
388	William H. Harrison	R	WY	January 3, 1967; Previous service, 1951–1955 and 1961–1965.	5th term**	Left the House in 1969.
389	Margaret Heckler	R	MA-10	January 3, 1967	1st term	
390	John E. Hunt	R	NJ-01	January 3, 1967	1st term	
391	Abraham Kazen	D	TX-23	January 3, 1967	1st term	
392	Thomas S. Kleppe	R	ND-02	January 3, 1967	1st term	
393	Dan Kuykendall	R	TN-09	January 3, 1967	1st term	
394	John Henry Kyl	R	IA-04	January 3, 1967; Previous service, 1959–1965.	4th term*	
395	Peter Kyros	D	ME-01	January 3, 1967	1st term	
396	Sherman P. Lloyd	R	UT-02	January 3, 1967; Previous service, 1963–1965.	2nd term*	
397	Buz Lukens	R	OH-24	January 3, 1967	1st term	
398	Bob Mathias	R	CA-18	January 3, 1967	1st term	
399	Wiley Mayne	R	IA-06	January 3, 1967	1st term	
400	James A. McClure	R	ID-01	January 3, 1967	1st term	
401	Jack H. McDonald	R	MI-19	January 3, 1967	1st term	
402	Thomas Joseph Meskill	R	CT-06	January 3, 1967	1st term	
403	Clarence E. Miller	R	OH-10	January 3, 1967	1st term	
404	Sonny Montgomery	D	MS-04	January 3, 1967	1st term	
405	John Myers	R	IN-07	January 3, 1967	1st term	
406	Bill Nichols	D	AL-04	January 3, 1967	1st term	
407	Jerry Pettis	R	CA-33	January 3, 1967	1st term	
408	Bob Price	R	TX-18	January 3, 1967	1st term	
409	Howard Wallace Pollock	D	AK	January 3, 1967	1st term	
410	Tom Railsback	R	IL-19	January 3, 1967	1st term	
411	John Rarick	D	LA-06	January 3, 1967	1st term	
412	Donald W. Riegle Jr.	R	MI-07	January 3, 1967	1st term	
413	William V. Roth Jr.	R	DE	January 3, 1967	1st term	
414	Philip Ruppe	R	MI-11	January 3, 1967	1st term	
415	Charles W. Sandman Jr.	R	NJ-02	January 3, 1967	1st term	
416	Henry C. Schadeberg	R	WI-01	January 3, 1967; Previous service, 1961–1965.	3rd term*	
417	Fred Schwengel	R	IA-01	January 3, 1967; Previous service, 1955–1965.	6th term*	
418	William J. Scherle	R	IA-07	January 3, 1967	1st term	
419	William L. Scott	R	VA-08	January 3, 1967	1st term	
420	James Vernon Smith	R	OK-06	January 3, 1967	1st term	Left the House in 1969.
421	Gene Snyder	R	KY-04	January 3, 1967; Previous service, 1963–1965.	2nd term*	
422	Sam Steiger	R	AZ-03	January 3, 1967	1st term	
423	William A. Steiger	R	WI-06	January 3, 1967	1st term	
424	W. S. Stuckey Jr.	D	GA-08	January 3, 1967	1st term	
425	Robert Taft Jr.	R	OH-01	January 3, 1967; Previous service, 1963–1965.	2nd term*	
426	Fletcher Thompson	R	GA-05	January 3, 1967	1st term	
427	William C. Wampler	R	VA-09	January 3, 1967; Previous service, 1953–1955.	2nd term*	
428	Charles W. Whalen Jr.	R	OH-03	January 3, 1967	1st term	
429	Charles E. Wiggins	R	CA-25	January 3, 1967	1st term	
430	Lawrence G. Williams	R	PA-07	January 3, 1967	1st term	
431	Larry Winn	R	KS-03	January 3, 1967	1st term	
432	Chalmers Wylie	R	OH-15	January 3, 1967	1st term	
433	Louis C. Wyman	R	NH-01	January 3, 1967; Previous service, 1963–1965.	2nd term*	
434	Roger H. Zion	R	IN-08	January 3, 1967	1st term	
435	John M. Zwach	R	MN-06	January 3, 1967	1st term	
	Robert Tiernan	D	RI-02	March 28, 1967	1st term	
	Pete McCloskey	R	CA-11	December 12, 1967	1st term	
	Bertram L. Podell	D	NY-13	February 20, 1968	1st term	
	Charles H. Griffin	D	MS-03	March 12, 1968	1st term	
	James M. Collins	R	TX-03	August 24, 1968	1st term	
	Joseph M. Gaydos	D	PA-20	November 5, 1968	1st term	

== Delegates ==
Rank	Delegate	Party	District	Seniority date (Previous service, if any)	No.# of term(s)	Notes
1	Santiago Polanco-Abreu	D	PR	January 3, 1965	2nd term	

== See also ==
- 90th United States Congress
- List of United States congressional districts
- List of United States senators in the 90th Congress
