= List of United States senators in the 90th Congress =

This is a complete list of United States senators during the 90th United States Congress listed by seniority from January 3, 1967, to January 3, 1969.

Order of service is based on the commencement of the senator's first term. Behind this is former service as a senator (only giving the senator seniority within their new incoming class), service as vice president, a House member, a cabinet secretary, or a governor of a state. The final factor is the population of the senator's state.

In this congress, J. William Fulbright (Arkansas) was the senior junior senator and Harry F. Byrd Jr. (Virginia) was the junior senior senator.

Senators who were sworn in during the middle of the two-year congressional term (up until the last senator who was not sworn in early after winning the November 1968 election) are listed at the end of the list with no number.

== Terms of service ==
Class	Terms of service of senators that expired in years
Class 3	Terms of service of senators that expired in 1969 (AK, AL, AR, AZ, CA, CO, CT, FL, GA, HI, IA, ID, IL, IN, KS, KY, LA, MD, MO, NC, ND, NH, NV, NY, OH, OK, OR, PA, SC, SD, UT, VT, WA, and WI.)
Class 1	Terms of service of senators that expired in 1971 (AZ, CA, CT, DE, FL, HI, IN, MA, MD, ME, MI, MN, MO, MS, MT, ND, NE, NJ, NM, NV, NY, OH, PA, RI, TN, TX, UT, VA, VT, WA, WI, WV, and WY.)
Class 2	Terms of service of senators that expired in 1973 (AK, AL, AR, CO, DE, GA, IA, ID, IL, KS, KY, LA, MA, ME, MI, MN, MS, MT, NC, NE, NH, NJ, NM, OK, OR, RI, SC, SD, TN, TX, VA, WV, and WY.)

== U.S. Senate seniority list ==
U.S. Senate seniority
Rank	Senator (party-state)	Seniority date	Other factors
1	Carl Hayden (D-AZ)	March 4, 1927	
2	Richard Russell, Jr. (D-GA)	January 12, 1933	
3	Allen J. Ellender (D-LA)	January 3, 1937	
4	J. Lister Hill (D-AL)	January 11, 1938	
5	George Aiken (R-VT)	January 10, 1941	
6	James Eastland (D-MS)	January 3, 1943	Previously a senator
7	John Little McClellan (D-AR)	January 3, 1943	
8	Warren G. Magnuson (D-WA)	December 14, 1944	
9	J. William Fulbright (D-AR)	January 3, 1945	Former representative
10	Bourke B. Hickenlooper (R-IA)	January 3, 1945	Former governor
11	Wayne Morse (D-OR)	January 3, 1945	
12	Milton Young (R-ND)	March 12, 1945	
13	Spessard Holland (D-FL)	September 24, 1946	
14	John Sparkman (D-AL)	November 6, 1946	
15	John J. Williams (R-DE)	January 3, 1947	
16	John C. Stennis (D-MS)	November 17, 1947	
17	Karl Mundt (R-SD)	December 31, 1948	Former representative
18	Russell B. Long (D-LA)	December 31, 1948	
19	Margaret Chase Smith (R-ME)	January 3, 1949	Former representative (8 years, 7 months)
20	Clinton Anderson (D-NM)	January 3, 1949	Former representative (4 years, 5 months)
21	Frank Carlson (R-KS)	November 27, 1950	
22	John O. Pastore (D-RI)	December 19, 1950	
23	Everett Dirksen (R-IL)	January 3, 1951	Former representative (16 years)
24	Almer Monroney (D-OK)	January 3, 1951	Former representative (12 years)
25	George Smathers (D-FL)	January 3, 1951	Former representative (4 years)
26	Wallace F. Bennett (R-UT)	January 3, 1951	
27	Thomas Kuchel (R-CA)	January 2, 1953	
28	Albert Gore, Sr. (D-TN)	January 3, 1953	Former representative (14 years)
29	Henry M. Jackson (D-WA)	January 3, 1953	Former representative (12 years)
30	Mike Mansfield (D-MT)	January 3, 1953	Former representative (10 years)
31	Stuart Symington (D-MO)	January 3, 1953	
32	Sam Ervin (D-NC)	June 5, 1954	
33	Norris Cotton (R-NH)	November 8, 1954	Former representative (7 years, 10 months)
34	Roman Hruska (R-NE)	November 8, 1954	Former representative (1 year, 10 months)
35	Alan Bible (D-NV)	December 2, 1954	
36	Carl Curtis (R-NE)	January 1, 1955	
37	Clifford P. Case (R-NJ)	January 3, 1955	Former representative
38	Gordon L. Allott (R-CO)	January 3, 1955	
39	John Sherman Cooper (R-KY)	November 7, 1956	Previously a senator (twice) (total tenure 4 years, 4 months)
40	Strom Thurmond (R-SC)	November 7, 1956	Previously a senator (1 year, 3 months)
41	Thruston Ballard Morton (R-KY)	January 3, 1957	Former representative
42	Frank J. Lausche (D-OH)	January 3, 1957	Former governor, Ohio 5th in population (1950)
43	Herman Talmadge (D-GA)	January 3, 1957	Former governor, Georgia 13th in population (1950)
44	Joseph S. Clark (D-PA)	January 3, 1957	Pennsylvania 3rd in population (1950)
45	Frank Church (D-ID)	January 3, 1957	Idaho 43rd in population (1950)
46	Jacob K. Javits (R-NY)	January 9, 1957	
47	Ralph Yarborough (D-TX)	April 29, 1957	
48	William Proxmire (D-WI)	August 28, 1957	
49	B. Everett Jordan (D-NC)	April 19, 1958	
50	Jennings Randolph (D-WV)	November 5, 1958	
51	Hugh Scott (R-PA)	January 3, 1959	Former representative (18 years)
52	Eugene McCarthy (D-MN)	January 3, 1959	Former representative (10 years)
53	Stephen Young (D-OH)	January 3, 1959	Former representative (8 years), Ohio 5th in population (1950)
54	Winston L. Prouty (R-VT)	January 3, 1959	Former representative (8 years), Vermont 46th in population (1950)
55	Robert Byrd (D-WV)	January 3, 1959	Former representative (6 years)
56	Harrison A. Williams (D-NJ)	January 3, 1959	Former representative (4 years), New Jersey 8th in population (1950)
57	Thomas J. Dodd (D-CT)	January 3, 1959	Former representative (4 years), Connecticut 34th in population (1950)
58	Edward L. Bartlett (D-AK)	January 3, 1959	Former delegate
59	Edmund Muskie (D-ME)	January 3, 1959	Former governor, Maine 35th in population (1950)
60	Ernest Gruening (D-AK)	January 3, 1959	Former Territorial Governor, Alaska 50th in population (1950)
61	Philip Hart (D-MI)	January 3, 1959	Michigan 7th in population (1950)
62	Vance Hartke (D-IN)	January 3, 1959	Indiana 11th in population (1950)
63	Frank Moss (D-UT)	January 3, 1959	Utah 38th in population (1950)
64	Gale W. McGee (D-WY)	January 3, 1959	Wyoming 48th in population (1950)
65	Howard Cannon (D-NV)	January 3, 1959	Nevada 49th in population (1950)
66	Hiram Fong (R-HI)	August 21, 1959	
67	Quentin Northrup Burdick (D-ND)	August 8, 1960	
68	Edward V. Long (D-MO)	September 23, 1960	
69	Lee Metcalf (D-MT)	January 3, 1961	Former representative (8 years)
70	James Boggs (R-DE)	January 3, 1961	Former representative (6 years)
71	Jack Miller (R-IA)	January 3, 1961	Iowa 22nd in population (1950)
72	Claiborne Pell (D-RI)	January 3, 1961	Rhode Island 36th in population (1950)
73	John Tower (R-TX)	June 15, 1961	
74	James B. Pearson (R-KS)	January 31, 1962	
75	Len Jordan (R-ID)	August 6, 1962	
76	Ted Kennedy (D-MA)	November 7, 1962	Massachusetts 9th in population (1960)
77	Thomas J. McIntyre (D-NH)	November 7, 1962	New Hampshire 45th in population (1960)
78	Abraham A. Ribicoff (D-CT)	January 3, 1963	Former representative (4 years), former cabinet secretary
79	Daniel Brewster (D-MD)	January 3, 1963	Former representative (4 years) - Maryland 21st in population (1960)
89	George McGovern (D-SD)	January 3, 1963	Former representative (4 years) - South Dakota 40th in population (1960)
81	Daniel Inouye (D-HI)	January 3, 1963	Former representative (4 years) - Hawaii 43rd in population (1960)
82	Peter H. Dominick (R-CO)	January 3, 1963	Former representative (2 years)
83	Birch Bayh (D-IN)	January 3, 1963	
84	Gaylord Nelson (D-WI)	January 7, 1963	
85	Joseph Montoya (D-NM)	November 4, 1964	Former representative
86	Fred R. Harris (D-OK)	November 4, 1964	
87	Walter Mondale (D-MN)	December 30, 1964	
88	George Murphy (R-CA)	January 1, 1965	
89	Joseph Tydings (D-MD)	January 3, 1965	Former representative
90	Robert F. Kennedy (D-NY)	January 3, 1965	Former cabinet member
91	Paul Fannin (R-AZ)	January 3, 1965	
92	Harry F. Byrd, Jr. (D-VA)	November 12, 1965	
93	Robert P. Griffin (R-MI)	May 11, 1966	
94	Ernest Hollings (D-SC)	November 9, 1966	
95	William B. Spong, Jr. (D-VA)	December 31, 1966	
96	Clifford Hansen (R-WY)	January 3, 1967	Former governor
97	Charles H. Percy (R-IL)	January 3, 1967	Illinois 4th in population (1960)
98	Edward Brooke (R-MA)	January 3, 1967	Massachusetts 9th in population (1960)
99	Howard Baker (R-TN)	January 3, 1967	Tennessee 17th in population (1960)
100	Mark Hatfield (R-OR)	January 10, 1967	
	Charles Goodell (R-NY)	September 10, 1968	
	Marlow Cook (R-KY)	December 17, 1968	
	Ted Stevens (R-AK)	December 24, 1968	
	Thomas Eagleton (D-MO)	December 28, 1968	

The senior senators by class were Spessard Holland (D-Florida) from Class 1, Richard Russell Jr. (D-Georgia) from Class 2, and Carl Hayden (D-Arizona) from Class 3.

== See also ==
- 90th United States Congress
- List of United States representatives in the 90th Congress
