= 90th United States Congress =

1967–1969 U.S. Congress

| ← | 89th | 91st | → |
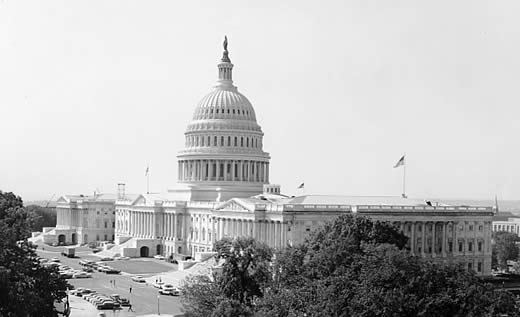
- United States Capitol (1962)

Overview
- Legislative body: United States Congress
- Jurisdiction: United States
- Term: January 3, 1967 – January 3, 1969

Senate
- Members: 100
- President: Hubert Humphrey (D)
- President pro tempore: Carl Hayden (D)
- Party control: Democratic

House of Representatives
- Members: 435
- Speaker: John W. McCormack (D)
- Party control: Democratic

Sessions
- 1st: January 10, 1967 – December 15, 1967
- 2nd: January 15, 1968 – October 14, 1968

The 90th United States Congress was a meeting of the legislative branch of the United States federal government, composed of the United States Senate and the United States House of Representatives. It met in Washington, D.C., from January 3, 1967, to January 3, 1969, during the last two years of President Lyndon B. Johnson's second term in office.

The apportionment of seats in this House of Representatives was based on the 1960 United States census.

Both chambers had a Democratic majority; however, the Democrats lost seats in both the Senate and the House, which cost them both their 2/3rds supermajority in the Senate and their supermajority status in the House. Along with President Johnson, the Democrats maintained an overall federal government trifecta.

== Major events ==
- January 27, 1967: Cold War: The United States, Soviet Union and the United Kingdom sign the Outer Space Treaty.
- April 1, 1967: The Department of Transportation begins operation.
- July 1, 1967: American Samoa's first constitution becomes effective.
- August 30, 1967: Thurgood Marshall is confirmed as the first African American Justice of the United States Supreme Court.
- March 18, 1968: Gold standard: The Congress of the United States repeals the requirement for a gold reserve to back U.S. currency.
- April 4, 1968: Martin Luther King Jr. is shot dead at the Lorraine Motel in Memphis, Tennessee. In response, riots erupt in major American cities, lasting for several days afterward.
- June 6, 1968: Robert F. Kennedy is shot and killed at the Ambassador Hotel in Los Angeles, California

== Major legislation ==
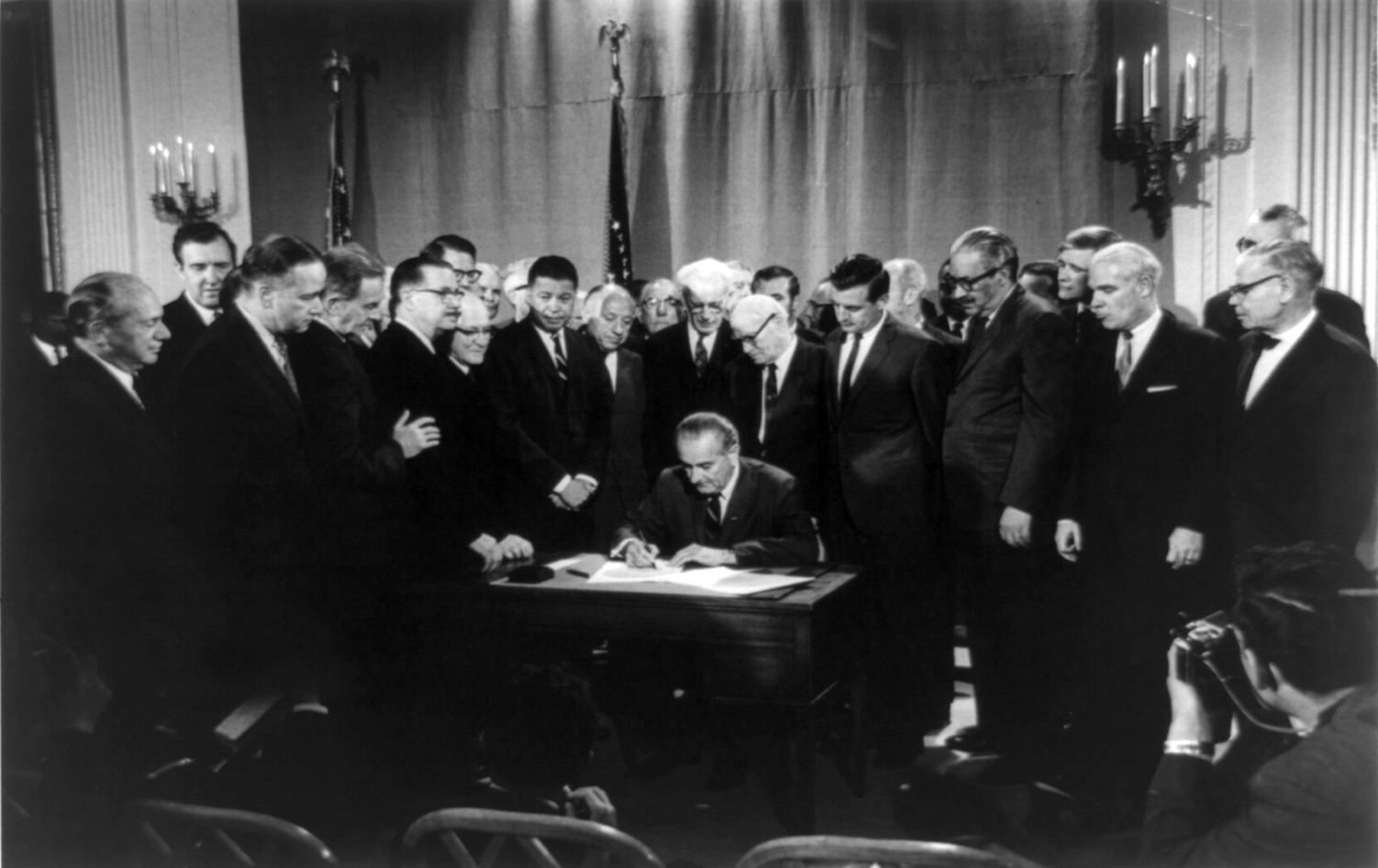
President Johnson signing the Civil Rights Act of 1968

- April 4, 1967: Supplemental Defense Appropriations Act, Pub. L. 90–8, 81 Stat. 8
- November 7, 1967: Public Broadcasting Act, Pub. L. 90–129, 81 Stat. 365
- December 14, 1967: Uniform Congressional District Act, Pub. L. 90–196, 81 Stat. 581
- December 15, 1967: Age Discrimination in Employment Act, Pub. L. 90–202, 81 Stat. 602
- December 18, 1967: National Park Foundation Act, Pub. L. 90–209, 81 Stat. 656
- January 2, 1968: Elementary and Secondary Education Amendments of 1967, Pub. L. 90–247, including Title VII: Bilingual Education Act, 81 Stat. 816
- March 1, 1968: Fire Research and Safety Act of 1968, Pub. L. 90–259, 82 Stat. 34
- April 11, 1968: Civil Rights Act of 1968, Pub. L. 90–284, 82 Stat. 73, including Title II: Indian Civil Rights Act, 82 Stat. 77
- May 29, 1968: Truth in Lending Act, Pub. L. 90–321
- June 1, 1968: Uniform Monday Holiday Act, Pub. L. 90–363, 82 Stat. 250
- June 19, 1968: Omnibus Crime Control and Safe Streets Act of 1968, Pub. L. 90–351, 82 Stat. 197
- July 21, 1968: Aircraft Noise Abatement Act, Pub. L. 90–411, 82 Stat. 395
- October 2, 1968: Wild and Scenic Rivers Act, Pub. L. 90–542, 82 Stat. 906
- October 2, 1968: National Trails System Act, Pub. L. 90–543, 82 Stat. 919
- October 15, 1968: Health Services and Facilities Amendments of 1968, Pub. L. 90–574, 82 Stat. 1006, including Title III: Alcoholic and Narcotic Addict Rehabilitation Amendments of 1968
- October 18, 1968: Radiation Control for Health and Safety Act of 1968, Pub. L. 90–602, 82 Stat. 1173
- October 22, 1968: Foreign Military Sales Act of 1968, Pub. L. 90–629, 82 Stat. 1320-2
- October 22, 1968: Gun Control Act of 1968, Pub. L. 90–618, 82 Stat. 1213

== Constitutional amendments ==
- February 10, 1967: Twenty-fifth Amendment to the United States Constitution was ratified by the requisite number of states (then 38) to become part of the Constitution

== Party summary ==
Party standings on the opening day of the 90th Congress 64 Democratic senators 36 Republican senators

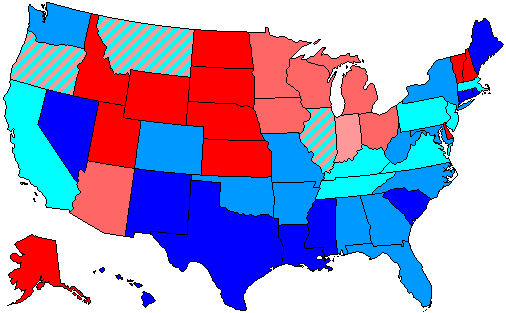
House seats by party holding plurality in state: 80.1-100% Democratic / 80.1-100% Republican; 60.1-80% Democratic / 60.1-80% Republican; Up to 60% Democratic / Up to 60% Republican

The count below identifies party affiliations at the beginning of the first session of this Congress, and includes members from vacancies and newly admitted states, when they were first seated. Changes resulting from subsequent replacements are shown below in the "Changes in membership" section.

=== Senate ===
| | Party (shading shows control) | | Total | Vacant |
| | Democratic (D) | Republican (R) | Total | Vacant |
|---|---|---|---|---|
| End of previous congress | 66 | 33 | 99 | 1 |
| Begin | 64 | 35 | 99 | 1 |
| End | 62 | 38 | 100 | 0 |
| Final voting share | 62.0% | 38.0% | | |
| Beginning of next congress | 57 | 43 | 100 | 0 |

=== House of Representatives ===
| | Party (shading shows control) | | Total | Vacant |
| | Democratic (D) | Republican (R) | Total | Vacant |
|---|---|---|---|---|
| End of previous congress | 288 | 137 | 425 | 10 |
| Begin | 248 | 187 | 435 | 0 |
| End | 247 | 186 | 433 | 2 |
| Final voting share | 57.0% | 43.0% | | |
| Beginning of next congress | 243 | 192 | 435 | 0 |

== Leadership ==
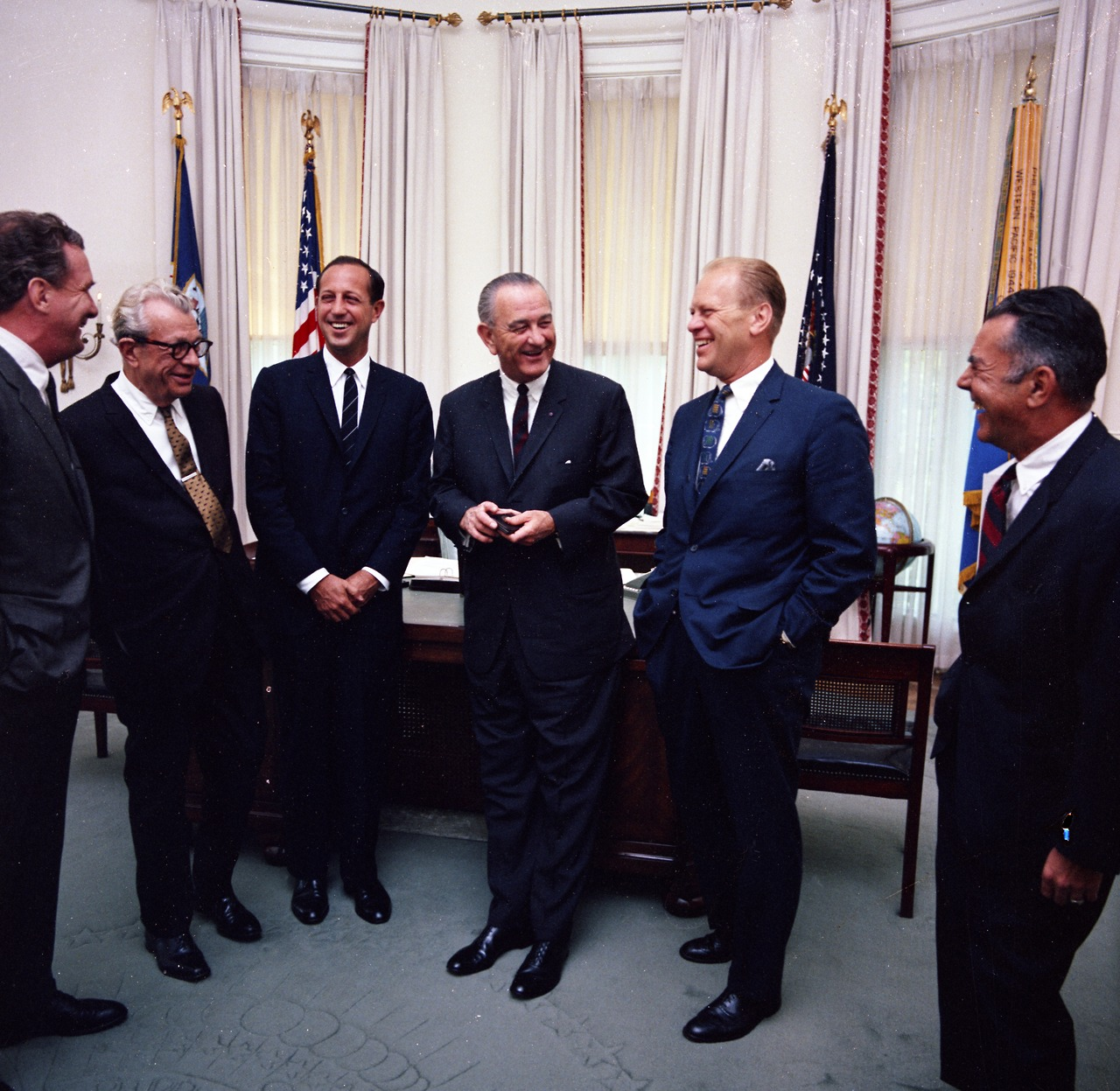
President Johnson with NFL owners and Republican congressional leaders, June 7, 1967. L-R: Edward Bennett Williams (President of the Washington Redskins), Senator Everett Dirksen, NFL Commissioner Pete Rozelle, President Lyndon B. Johnson, Rep. Gerald Ford, unidentified (probably Rep. John W. Byrnes)

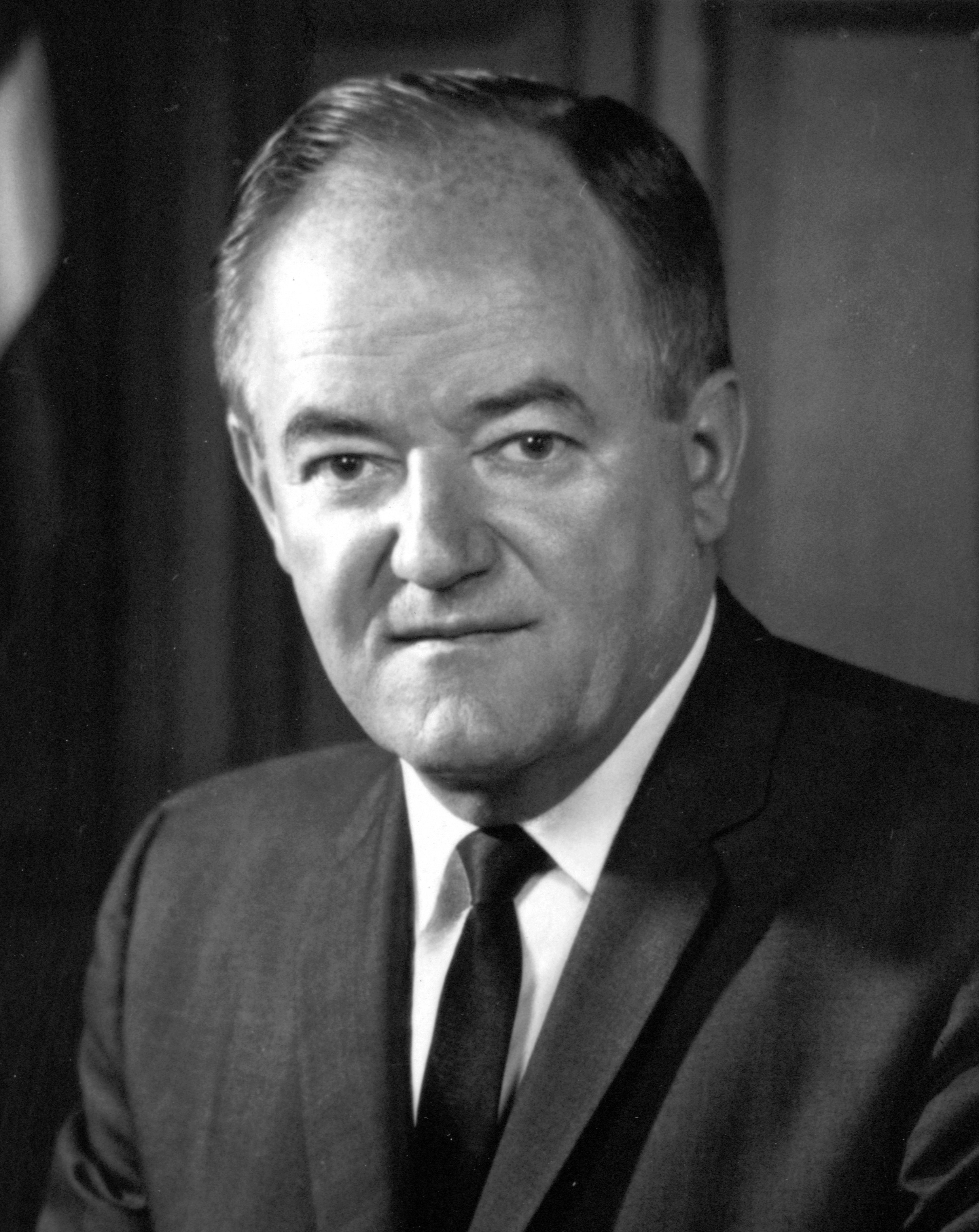
Senate President Hubert Humphrey

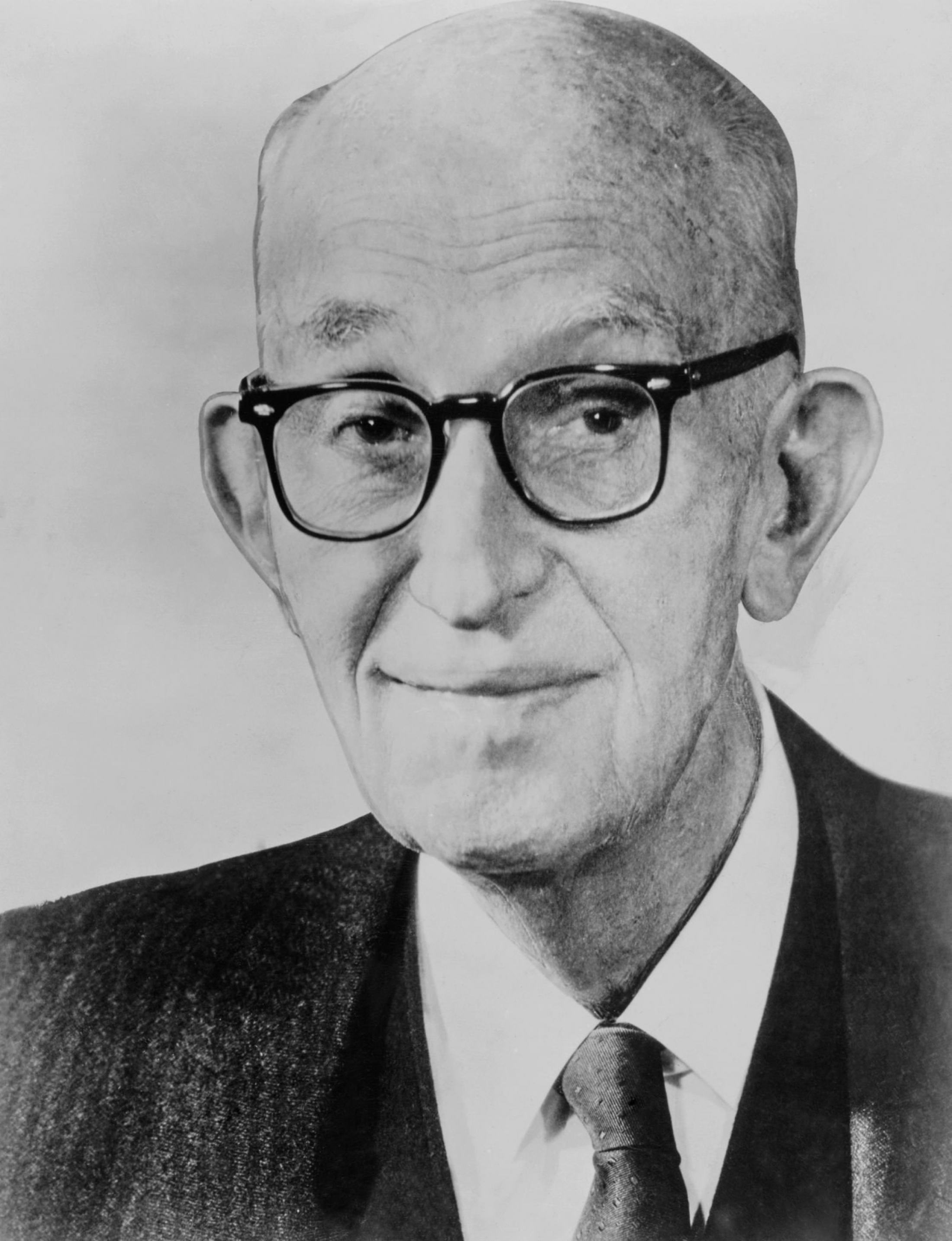
Senate President pro tempore Carl Hayden

=== Senate ===
- President: Hubert Humphrey (D)
- President pro tempore: Carl Hayden (D)
- Permanent Acting President pro tempore: Lee Metcalf (D)

==== Majority (Democratic) leadership ====
- Majority Leader: Mike Mansfield
- Majority Whip: Russell B. Long
- Democratic Caucus Secretary: Robert Byrd

==== Minority (Republican) leadership ====
- Minority Leader: Everett Dirksen
- Minority Whip: Thomas Kuchel
- Republican Conference Chairman: Margaret Chase Smith
- Republican Conference Secretary: Milton Young
- National Senatorial Committee Chair: George Murphy
- Policy Committee Chairman: Bourke B. Hickenlooper

=== House of Representatives ===
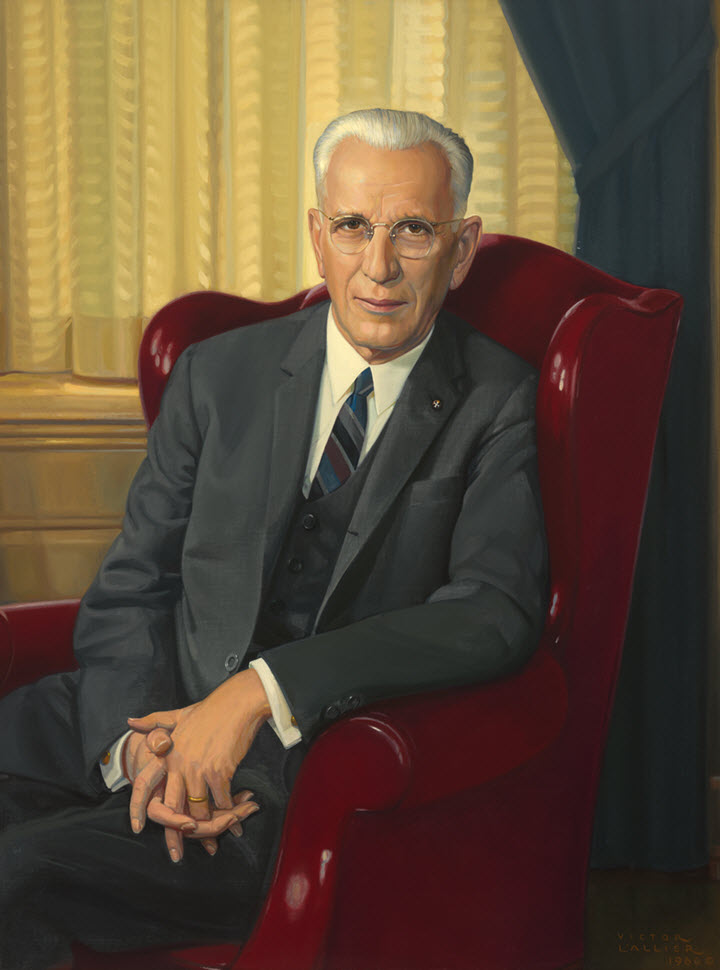
House Speaker John W. McCormack

- Speaker: John W. McCormack (D)

==== Majority (Democratic) leadership ====
- Majority Leader: Carl Albert
- Majority Whip: Hale Boggs
- Democratic Caucus Chairman: Dan Rostenkowski
- Democratic Caucus Secretary: Leonor Sullivan
- Democratic Campaign Committee Chairman: Michael J. Kirwan

==== Minority (Republican) leadership ====
- Minority Leader: Gerald Ford
- Minority Whip: Leslie C. Arends
- Republican Conference Chairman: Melvin Laird
- Republican Conference Secretary: Richard H. Poff
- Policy Committee Chairman: John Jacob Rhodes
- Republican Campaign Committee Chairman: Bob Wilson

== Caucuses ==
- House Democratic Caucus
- Senate Democratic Caucus

== Members ==
This list is arranged by chamber, then by state. Senators are listed by their classes, and representatives are listed by district.

=== Senate ===
Senators are popularly elected statewide every two years, with one-third beginning new six-year terms with each Congress. Preceding the names in the list below are Senate class numbers, which indicate the cycle of their election. In this Congress, Class 1 meant their term began in the last Congress, requiring re-election in 1970; Class 2 meant their term began with this Congress, requiring re-election in 1972; and Class 3 meant their term ended with this Congress, requiring re-election in 1968.

==== Alabama ====
▌2. John J. Sparkman (D)
▌3. J. Lister Hill (D)

==== Alaska ====
▌2. Bob Bartlett (D), until December 11, 1968

▌Ted Stevens (R), from December 24, 1968

▌3. Ernest Gruening (D)

==== Arizona ====
▌1. Paul Fannin (R)
▌3. Carl Hayden (D)

==== Arkansas ====
▌2. John L. McClellan (D)
▌3. J. William Fulbright (D)

==== California ====
▌1. George Murphy (R)
▌3. Thomas Kuchel (R)

==== Colorado ====
▌2. Gordon Allott (R)
▌3. Peter H. Dominick (R)

==== Connecticut ====
▌1. Thomas J. Dodd (D)
▌3. Abraham Ribicoff (D)

==== Delaware ====
▌1. John J. Williams (R)
▌2. J. Caleb Boggs (R)

==== Florida ====
▌1. Spessard Holland (D)
▌3. George Smathers (D)

==== Georgia ====
▌2. Richard Russell Jr. (D)
▌3. Herman Talmadge (D)

==== Hawaii ====
▌1. Hiram Fong (R)
▌3. Daniel Inouye (D)

==== Idaho ====
▌2. Len Jordan (R)
▌3. Frank Church (D)

==== Illinois ====
▌2. Charles H. Percy (R)
▌3. Everett M. Dirksen (R)

==== Indiana ====
▌1. Vance Hartke (D)
▌3. Birch Bayh (D)

==== Iowa ====
▌2. Jack Miller (R)
▌3. Bourke B. Hickenlooper (R)

==== Kansas ====
▌2. James B. Pearson (R)
▌3. Frank Carlson (R)

==== Kentucky ====
▌2. John Sherman Cooper (R)
▌3. Thruston Ballard Morton (R), until December 16, 1968

▌Marlow Cook (R), from December 17, 1968

==== Louisiana ====
▌2. Allen J. Ellender (D)
▌3. Russell B. Long (D)

==== Maine ====
▌1. Edmund Muskie (D)
▌2. Margaret Chase Smith (R)

==== Maryland ====
▌1. Joseph Tydings (D)
▌3. Daniel Brewster (D)

==== Massachusetts ====
▌1. Ted Kennedy (D)
▌2. Edward Brooke (R)

==== Michigan ====
▌1. Philip Hart (D)
▌2. Robert P. Griffin (R)

==== Minnesota ====
▌1. Eugene McCarthy (DFL) (Note: The Minnesota Democratic–Farmer–Labor Party (DFL) and the North Dakota Democratic-Nonpartisan League Party (D-NPL) are the Minnesota and North Dakota affiliates of the U.S. Democratic Party and are counted as Democrats.)
▌2. Walter Mondale (DFL)

==== Mississippi ====
▌1. John C. Stennis (D)
▌2. James Eastland (D)

==== Missouri ====
▌1. Stuart Symington (D)
▌3. Edward V. Long (D), until December 27, 1968

▌Thomas Eagleton (D), from December 28, 1968

==== Montana ====
▌1. Mike Mansfield (D)
▌2. Lee Metcalf (D)

==== Nebraska ====
▌1. Roman Hruska (R)
▌2. Carl Curtis (R)

==== Nevada ====
▌1. Howard Cannon (D)
▌3. Alan Bible (D)

==== New Hampshire ====
▌2. Thomas J. McIntyre (D)
▌3. Norris Cotton (R)

==== New Jersey ====
▌1. Harrison A. Williams (D)
▌2. Clifford P. Case (R)

==== New Mexico ====
▌1. Joseph Montoya (D)
▌2. Clinton P. Anderson (D)

==== New York ====
▌1. Robert F. Kennedy (D), until June 6, 1968

▌Charles Goodell (R), from September 10, 1968

▌3. Jacob Javits (R)

==== North Carolina ====
▌2. B. Everett Jordan (D)
▌3. Sam Ervin (D)

==== North Dakota ====
▌1. Quentin Burdick (D-NPL)
▌3. Milton Young (R)

==== Ohio ====
▌1. Stephen M. Young (D)
▌3. Frank Lausche (D)

==== Oklahoma ====
▌2. Fred R. Harris (D)
▌3. A. S. Mike Monroney (D)

==== Oregon ====
▌2. Mark Hatfield (R), from January 10, 1967
▌3. Wayne Morse (D)

==== Pennsylvania ====
▌1. Hugh Scott (R)
▌3. Joseph S. Clark Jr. (D)

==== Rhode Island ====
▌1. John Pastore (D)
▌2. Claiborne Pell (D)

==== South Carolina ====
▌2. Strom Thurmond (R)
▌3. Fritz Hollings (D)

==== South Dakota ====
▌2. Karl E. Mundt (R)
▌3. George McGovern (D)

==== Tennessee ====
▌1. Albert Gore Sr. (D)
▌2. Howard Baker (R)

==== Texas ====
▌1. Ralph Yarborough (D)
▌2. John Tower (R)

==== Utah ====
▌1. Frank Moss (D)
▌3. Wallace F. Bennett (R)

==== Vermont ====
▌1. Winston L. Prouty (R)
▌3. George Aiken (R)

==== Virginia ====
▌1. Harry F. Byrd Jr. (D)
▌2. William Spong Jr. (D)

==== Washington ====
▌1. Henry M. Jackson (D)
▌3. Warren G. Magnuson (D)

==== West Virginia ====
▌1. Robert Byrd (D)
▌2. Jennings Randolph (D)

==== Wisconsin ====
▌1. William Proxmire (D)
▌3. Gaylord Nelson (D)

==== Wyoming ====
▌1. Gale W. McGee (D)
▌2. Clifford Hansen (R)

Senators' party membership by state at the opening of the 90th Congress in January 1967 2 Democrats 1 Democrat and 1 Republican 2 Republicans

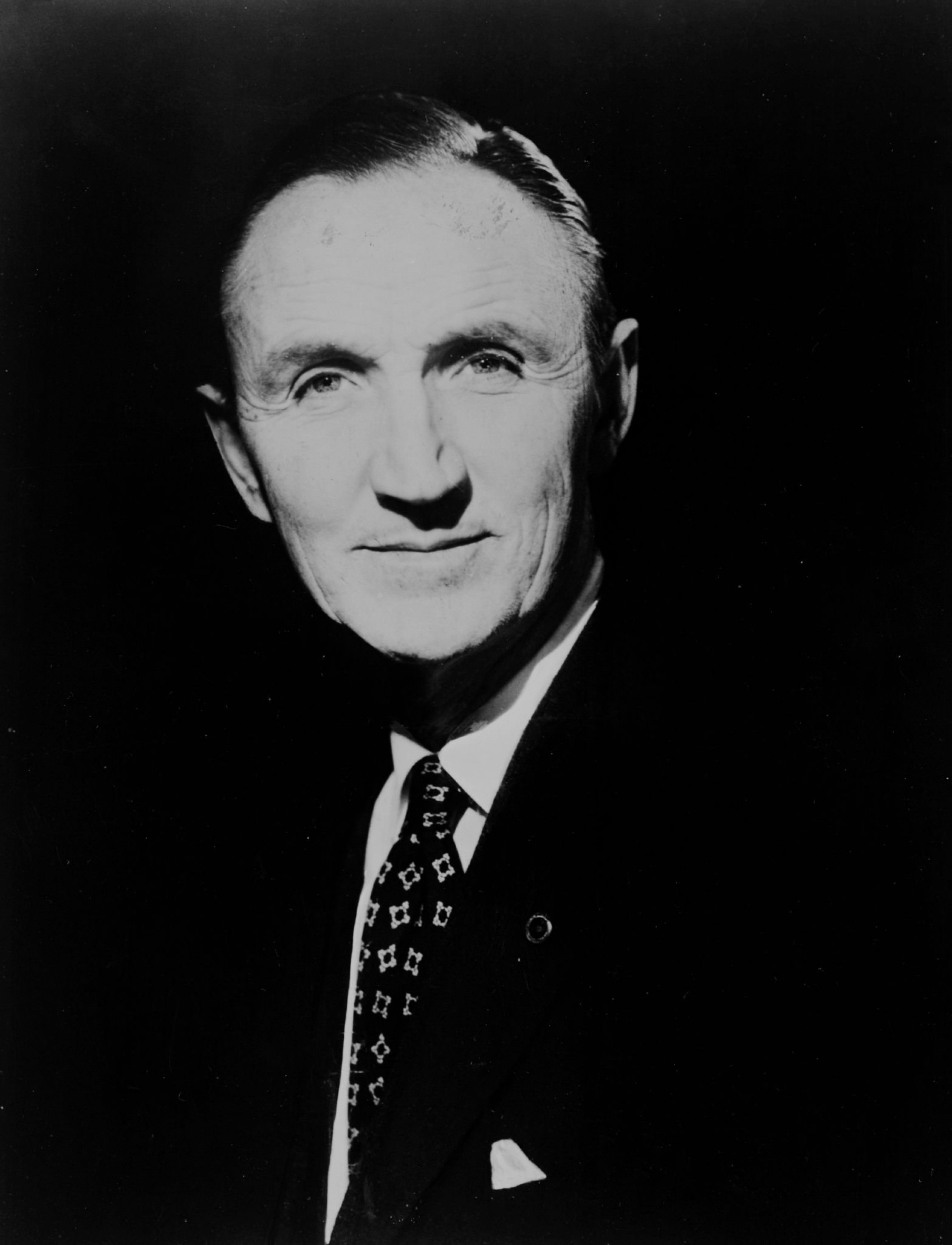
Senate Majority leader Mike Mansfield

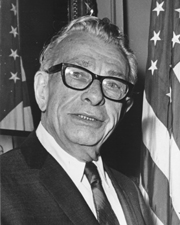
Senate Minority leader Everett Dirksen

=== House of Representatives ===
The names of representatives elected statewide on the general ticket or otherwise at-large, are preceded by an "At-large," and the names of those elected from districts, whether plural or single member, are preceded by their district numbers.

==== Alabama ====
▌1. Jack Edwards (R)
▌2. William Louis Dickinson (R)
▌3. George W. Andrews (D)
▌4. Bill Nichols (D)
▌5. Armistead I. Selden Jr. (D)
▌6. John Hall Buchanan Jr. (R)
▌7. Tom Bevill (D)
▌8. Robert E. Jones Jr. (D)

==== Alaska ====
▌At-large. Howard Wallace Pollock (R)

==== Arizona ====
▌1. John Jacob Rhodes (R)
▌2. Mo Udall (D)
▌3. Sam Steiger (R)

==== Arkansas ====
▌1. Ezekiel C. Gathings (D)
▌2. Wilbur Mills (D)
▌3. John Paul Hammerschmidt (R)
▌4. David Pryor (D)

==== California ====
▌1. Donald H. Clausen (R)
▌2. Harold T. Johnson (D)
▌3. John E. Moss (D)
▌4. Robert L. Leggett (D)
▌5. Phillip Burton (D)
▌6. William S. Mailliard (R)
▌7. Jeffery Cohelan (D)
▌8. George P. Miller (D)
▌9. Don Edwards (D)
▌10. Charles Gubser (R)
▌11. J. Arthur Younger (R), until June 20, 1967

▌Pete McCloskey (R), from December 12, 1967

▌12. Burt Talcott (R)
▌13. Charles M. Teague (R)
▌14. Jerome Waldie (D)
▌15. John J. McFall (D)
▌16. B. F. Sisk (D)
▌17. Cecil R. King (D)
▌18. Bob Mathias (R)
▌19. Chester E. Holifield (D)
▌20. H. Allen Smith (R)
▌21. Augustus Hawkins (D)
▌22. James C. Corman (D)
▌23. Del M. Clawson (R)
▌24. Glenard P. Lipscomb (R)
▌25. Charles E. Wiggins (R)
▌26. Thomas M. Rees (D)
▌27. Edwin Reinecke (R)
▌28. Alphonzo E. Bell Jr. (R)
▌29. George Brown Jr. (D)
▌30. Edward R. Roybal (D)
▌31. Charles H. Wilson (D)
▌32. Craig Hosmer (R)
▌33. Jerry Pettis (R)
▌34. Richard T. Hanna (D)
▌35. James B. Utt (R)
▌36. Bob Wilson (R)
▌37. Lionel Van Deerlin (D)
▌38. John V. Tunney (D)

==== Colorado ====
▌1. Byron G. Rogers (D)
▌2. Donald G. Brotzman (R)
▌3. Frank Evans (D)
▌4. Wayne N. Aspinall (D)

==== Connecticut ====
▌1. Emilio Q. Daddario (D)
▌2. William St. Onge (D)
▌3. Robert Giaimo (D)
▌4. Donald J. Irwin (D)
▌5. John S. Monagan (D)
▌6. Thomas Meskill (R)

==== Delaware ====
▌At-large. William Roth (R)

==== Florida ====
▌1. Robert L. F. Sikes (D)
▌2. Don Fuqua (D)
▌3. Charles E. Bennett (D)
▌4. Syd Herlong (D)
▌5. Edward Gurney (R)
▌6. Sam Gibbons (D)
▌7. James A. Haley (D)
▌8. William C. Cramer (R)
▌9. Paul Rogers (D)
▌10. J. Herbert Burke (R)
▌11. Claude Pepper (D)
▌12. Dante Fascell (D)

==== Georgia ====
▌1. George Elliott Hagan (D)
▌2. Maston E. O'Neal Jr. (D)
▌3. Jack Brinkley (D)
▌4. Benjamin B. Blackburn (R)
▌5. Fletcher Thompson (R)
▌6. John Flynt (D)
▌7. John William Davis (D)
▌8. W. S. Stuckey Jr. (D)
▌9. Phillip M. Landrum (D)
▌10. Robert Grier Stephens Jr. (D)

==== Hawaii ====
Both representatives were elected at-large statewide on a general ticket

▌At-large. Spark Matsunaga (D)
▌At-large. Patsy Mink (D)

==== Idaho ====
▌1. James A. McClure (R)
▌2. George V. Hansen (R)

==== Illinois ====
▌1. William L. Dawson (D)
▌2. Barratt O'Hara (D)
▌3. William T. Murphy (D)
▌4. Ed Derwinski (R)
▌5. John C. Kluczynski (D)
▌6. Daniel J. Ronan (D)
▌7. Frank Annunzio (D)
▌8. Dan Rostenkowski (D)
▌9. Sidney R. Yates (D)
▌10. Harold R. Collier (R)
▌11. Roman Pucinski (D)
▌12. Robert McClory (R)
▌13. Donald Rumsfeld (R)
▌14. John N. Erlenborn (R)
▌15. Charlotte Thompson Reid (R)
▌16. John B. Anderson (R)
▌17. Leslie C. Arends (R)
▌18. Robert H. Michel (R)
▌19. Tom Railsback (R)
▌20. Paul Findley (R)
▌21. Kenneth J. Gray (D)
▌22. William L. Springer (R)
▌23. George E. Shipley (D)
▌24. Melvin Price (D)

==== Indiana ====
▌1. Ray Madden (D)
▌2. Charles A. Halleck (R)
▌3. John Brademas (D)
▌4. E. Ross Adair (R)
▌5. J. Edward Roush (D)
▌6. William G. Bray (R)
▌7. John T. Myers (R)
▌8. Roger H. Zion (R)
▌9. Lee H. Hamilton (D)
▌10. Richard L. Roudebush (R)
▌11. Andrew Jacobs Jr. (D)

==== Iowa ====
▌1. Fred Schwengel (R)
▌2. John Culver (D)
▌3. H. R. Gross (R)
▌4. John Henry Kyl (R)
▌5. Neal Edward Smith (D)
▌6. Wiley Mayne (R)
▌7. William J. Scherle (R)

==== Kansas ====
▌1. Bob Dole (R)
▌2. Chester L. Mize (R)
▌3. Larry Winn (R)
▌4. Garner E. Shriver (R)
▌5. Joe Skubitz (R)

==== Kentucky ====
▌1. Frank Stubblefield (D)
▌2. William Natcher (D)
▌3. William Cowger (R)
▌4. Gene Snyder (R)
▌5. Tim Lee Carter (R)
▌6. John C. Watts (D)
▌7. Carl D. Perkins (D)

==== Louisiana ====
▌1. F. Edward Hébert (D)
▌2. Hale Boggs (D)
▌3. Edwin E. Willis (D)
▌4. Joe Waggonner (D)
▌5. Otto Passman (D)
▌6. John Rarick (D)
▌7. Edwin Edwards (D)
▌8. Speedy Long (D)

==== Maine ====
▌1. Peter Kyros (D)
▌2. William Hathaway (D)

==== Maryland ====
▌1. Rogers Morton (R)
▌2. Clarence Long (D)
▌3. Edward Garmatz (D)
▌4. George Hyde Fallon (D)
▌5. Hervey Machen (D)
▌6. Charles Mathias (R)
▌7. Samuel Friedel (D)
▌8. Gilbert Gude (R)

==== Massachusetts ====
▌1. Silvio O. Conte (R)
▌2. Edward Boland (D)
▌3. Philip J. Philbin (D)
▌4. Harold Donohue (D)
▌5. F. Bradford Morse (R)
▌6. William H. Bates (R)
▌7. Torbert Macdonald (D)
▌8. Tip O'Neill (D)
▌9. John W. McCormack (D)
▌10. Margaret Heckler (R)
▌11. James A. Burke (D)
▌12. Hastings Keith (R)

==== Michigan ====
▌1. John Conyers (D)
▌2. Marvin L. Esch (R)
▌3. Garry E. Brown (R)
▌4. J. Edward Hutchinson (R)
▌5. Gerald Ford (R)
▌6. Charles E. Chamberlain (R)
▌7. Donald Riegle (R)
▌8. R. James Harvey (R)
▌9. Guy Vander Jagt (R)
▌10. Elford Albin Cederberg (R)
▌11. Philip Ruppe (R)
▌12. James G. O'Hara (D)
▌13. Charles Diggs (D)
▌14. Lucien Nedzi (D)
▌15. William D. Ford (D)
▌16. John D. Dingell Jr. (D)
▌17. Martha Griffiths (D)
▌18. William Broomfield (R)
▌19. Jack H. McDonald (R)

==== Minnesota ====
▌1. Al Quie (R)
▌2. Ancher Nelsen (R)
▌3. Clark MacGregor (R)
▌4. Joseph Karth (DFL)
▌5. Donald M. Fraser (DFL)
▌6. John M. Zwach (R)
▌7. Odin Langen (R)
▌8. John Blatnik (DFL)

==== Mississippi ====
▌1. Thomas Abernethy (D)
▌2. Jamie L. Whitten (D)
▌3. John Bell Williams (D), until January 16, 1968

▌Charles H. Griffin (D), from March 12, 1968

▌4. Sonny Montgomery (D)
▌5. William M. Colmer (D)

==== Missouri ====
▌1. Frank M. Karsten (D)
▌2. Thomas B. Curtis (R)
▌3. Leonor Sullivan (D)
▌4. William J. Randall (D)
▌5. Richard Walker Bolling (D)
▌6. William Raleigh Hull Jr. (D)
▌7. Durward Gorham Hall (R)
▌8. Richard Howard Ichord Jr. (D)
▌9. William L. Hungate (D)
▌10. Paul C. Jones (D)

==== Montana ====
▌1. Arnold Olsen (D)
▌2. James F. Battin (R)

==== Nebraska ====
▌1. Robert Vernon Denney (R)
▌2. Glenn Cunningham (R)
▌3. David Martin (R)

==== Nevada ====
▌At-large. Walter S. Baring Jr. (D)

==== New Hampshire ====
▌1. Louis C. Wyman (R)
▌2. James Colgate Cleveland (R)

==== New Jersey ====
▌1. John E. Hunt (R)
▌2. Charles W. Sandman Jr. (R)
▌3. James J. Howard (D)
▌4. Frank Thompson (D)
▌5. Peter Frelinghuysen Jr. (R)
▌6. William T. Cahill (R)
▌7. William B. Widnall (R)
▌8. Charles Samuel Joelson (D)
▌9. Henry Helstoski (D)
▌10. Peter W. Rodino (D)
▌11. Joseph Minish (D)
▌12. Florence P. Dwyer (R)
▌13. Cornelius Gallagher (D)
▌14. Dominick V. Daniels (D)
▌15. Edward J. Patten (D)

==== New Mexico ====
▌At-large. Thomas G. Morris (D)
▌At-large. E. S. Johnny Walker (D)

==== New York ====
▌1. Otis G. Pike (D)
▌2. James R. Grover Jr. (R)
▌3. Lester L. Wolff (D)
▌4. John W. Wydler (R)
▌5. Herbert Tenzer (D)
▌6. Seymour Halpern (R)
▌7. Joseph P. Addabbo (D)
▌8. Benjamin Stanley Rosenthal (D)
▌9. James J. Delaney (D)
▌10. Emanuel Celler (D)
▌11. Frank J. Brasco (D)
▌12. Edna F. Kelly (D)
▌13. Abraham J. Multer (D), until December 31, 1967

▌Bertram L. Podell (D), from February 20, 1968

▌14. John J. Rooney (D)
▌15. Hugh Carey (D)
▌16. John M. Murphy (D)
▌17. Theodore R. Kupferman (R)
▌18. Adam Clayton Powell Jr. (D), until February 28, 1967, and from April 11, 1967
▌19. Leonard Farbstein (D)
▌20. William Fitts Ryan (D)
▌21. James H. Scheuer (D)
▌22. Jacob H. Gilbert (D)
▌23. Jonathan Brewster Bingham (D)
▌24. Paul A. Fino (R), until December 31, 1968
▌25. Richard Ottinger (D)
▌26. Ogden Reid (R)
▌27. John G. Dow (D)
▌28. Joseph Y. Resnick (D)
▌29. Daniel E. Button (R)
▌30. Carleton J. King (R)
▌31. Robert C. McEwen (R)
▌32. Alexander Pirnie (R)
▌33. Howard W. Robison (R)
▌34. James M. Hanley (D)
▌35. Samuel S. Stratton (D)
▌36. Frank Horton (R)
▌37. Barber Conable (R)
▌38. Charles Goodell (R), until September 9, 1968
▌39. Richard D. McCarthy (D)
▌40. Henry P. Smith III (R)
▌41. Thaddeus J. Dulski (D)

==== North Carolina ====
▌1. Walter B. Jones Sr. (D)
▌2. Lawrence H. Fountain (D)
▌3. David N. Henderson (D)
▌4. Jim Gardner (R)
▌5. Nick Galifianakis (D)
▌6. Horace R. Kornegay (D)
▌7. Alton Lennon (D)
▌8. Charles R. Jonas (R)
▌9. Jim Broyhill (R)
▌10. Basil Lee Whitener (D)
▌11. Roy A. Taylor (D)

==== North Dakota ====
▌1. Mark Andrews (R)
▌2. Thomas S. Kleppe (R)

==== Ohio ====
▌1. Robert Taft Jr. (R)
▌2. Donald D. Clancy (R)
▌3. Charles W. Whalen Jr. (R)
▌4. William Moore McCulloch (R)
▌5. Del Latta (R)
▌6. Bill Harsha (R)
▌7. Bud Brown (R)
▌8. Jackson Edward Betts (R)
▌9. Thomas L. Ashley (D)
▌10. Clarence E. Miller (R)
▌11. J. William Stanton (R)
▌12. Samuel L. Devine (R)
▌13. Charles Adams Mosher (R)
▌14. William Hanes Ayres (R)
▌15. Chalmers Wylie (R)
▌16. Frank T. Bow (R)
▌17. John M. Ashbrook (R)
▌18. Wayne Hays (D)
▌19. Michael J. Kirwan (D)
▌20. Michael A. Feighan (D)
▌21. Charles Vanik (D)
▌22. Frances P. Bolton (R)
▌23. William Edwin Minshall Jr. (R)
▌24. Buz Lukens (R)

==== Oklahoma ====
▌1. Page Belcher (R)
▌2. Ed Edmondson (D)
▌3. Carl Albert (D)
▌4. Tom Steed (D)
▌5. John Jarman (D)
▌6. James V. Smith (R)

==== Oregon ====
▌1. Wendell Wyatt (R)
▌2. Al Ullman (D)
▌3. Edith Green (D)
▌4. John R. Dellenback (R)

==== Pennsylvania ====
▌1. William A. Barrett (D)
▌2. Robert N. C. Nix Sr. (D)
▌3. James A. Byrne (D)
▌4. Joshua Eilberg (D)
▌5. William J. Green III (D)
▌6. George M. Rhodes (D)
▌7. Lawrence G. Williams (R)
▌8. Edward G. Biester Jr. (R)
▌9. George Watkins (R)
▌10. Joseph M. McDade (R)
▌11. Dan Flood (D)
▌12. J. Irving Whalley (R)
▌13. Richard Schweiker (R)
▌14. William S. Moorhead (D)
▌15. Fred B. Rooney (D)
▌16. Edwin Duing Eshleman (R)
▌17. Herman T. Schneebeli (R)
▌18. Robert J. Corbett (R)
▌19. George Atlee Goodling (R)
▌20. Elmer J. Holland (D), until August 9, 1968

▌Joseph M. Gaydos (D), from November 5, 1968

▌21. John Herman Dent (D)
▌22. John P. Saylor (R)
▌23. Albert W. Johnson (R)
▌24. Joseph P. Vigorito (D)
▌25. Frank M. Clark (D)
▌26. Thomas E. Morgan (D)
▌27. James G. Fulton (R)

==== Rhode Island ====
▌1. Fernand St Germain (D)
▌2. John E. Fogarty (D), until January 10, 1967

▌Robert Tiernan (D), from March 28, 1967

==== South Carolina ====
▌1. L. Mendel Rivers (D)
▌2. Albert Watson (R)
▌3. William Jennings Bryan Dorn (D)
▌4. Robert T. Ashmore (D)
▌5. Thomas S. Gettys (D)
▌6. John L. McMillan (D)

==== South Dakota ====
▌1. Ben Reifel (R)
▌2. Ellis Yarnal Berry (R)

==== Tennessee ====
▌1. Jimmy Quillen (R)
▌2. John Duncan Sr. (R)
▌3. Bill Brock (R)
▌4. Joe L. Evins (D)
▌5. Richard Fulton (D)
▌6. William Anderson (D)
▌7. Ray Blanton (D)
▌8. Fats Everett (D)
▌9. Dan Kuykendall (R)

==== Texas ====
▌1. Wright Patman (D)
▌2. John Dowdy (D)
▌3. Joe R. Pool (D), until July 14, 1968

▌James M. Collins (R), from August 24, 1968

▌4. Ray Roberts (D)
▌5. Earle Cabell (D)
▌6. Olin E. Teague (D)
▌7. George H. W. Bush (R)
▌8. Robert C. Eckhardt (D)
▌9. Jack Brooks (D)
▌10. J. J. Pickle (D)
▌11. William R. Poage (D)
▌12. Jim Wright (D)
▌13. Graham B. Purcell Jr. (D)
▌14. John Andrew Young (D)
▌15. Kika de la Garza (D)
▌16. Richard Crawford White (D)
▌17. Omar Burleson (D)
▌18. Bob Price (R)
▌19. George H. Mahon (D)
▌20. Henry B. González (D)
▌21. O. C. Fisher (D)
▌22. Robert R. Casey (D)
▌23. Abraham Kazen (D)

==== Utah ====
▌1. Laurence J. Burton (R)
▌2. Sherman P. Lloyd (R)

==== Vermont ====
▌At-large. Robert Stafford (R)

==== Virginia ====
▌1. Thomas N. Downing (D)
▌2. Porter Hardy Jr. (D)
▌3. David E. Satterfield III (D)
▌4. Watkins Moorman Abbitt (D)
▌5. William M. Tuck (D)
▌6. Richard Harding Poff (R)
▌7. John Otho Marsh Jr. (D)
▌8. William L. Scott (R)
▌9. William C. Wampler (R)
▌10. Joel Broyhill (R)

==== Washington ====
▌1. Thomas Pelly (R)
▌2. Lloyd Meeds (D)
▌3. Julia Butler Hansen (D)
▌4. Catherine Dean May (R)
▌5. Tom Foley (D)
▌6. Floyd Hicks (D)
▌7. Brock Adams (D)

==== West Virginia ====
▌1. Arch A. Moore Jr. (R)
▌2. Harley Orrin Staggers (D)
▌3. John M. Slack Jr. (D)
▌4. Ken Hechler (D)
▌5. James Kee (D)

==== Wisconsin ====
▌1. Henry C. Schadeberg (R)
▌2. Robert Kastenmeier (D)
▌3. Vernon Wallace Thomson (R)
▌4. Clement J. Zablocki (D)
▌5. Henry S. Reuss (D)
▌6. William A. Steiger (R)
▌7. Melvin Laird (R)
▌8. John W. Byrnes (R)
▌9. Glenn Robert Davis (R)
▌10. Alvin O'Konski (R)

==== Wyoming ====
▌At-large. William Henry Harrison III (R)

==== Non-voting member ====
▌Puerto Rico. Santiago Polanco-Abreu (Resident Commissioner) (PPD)

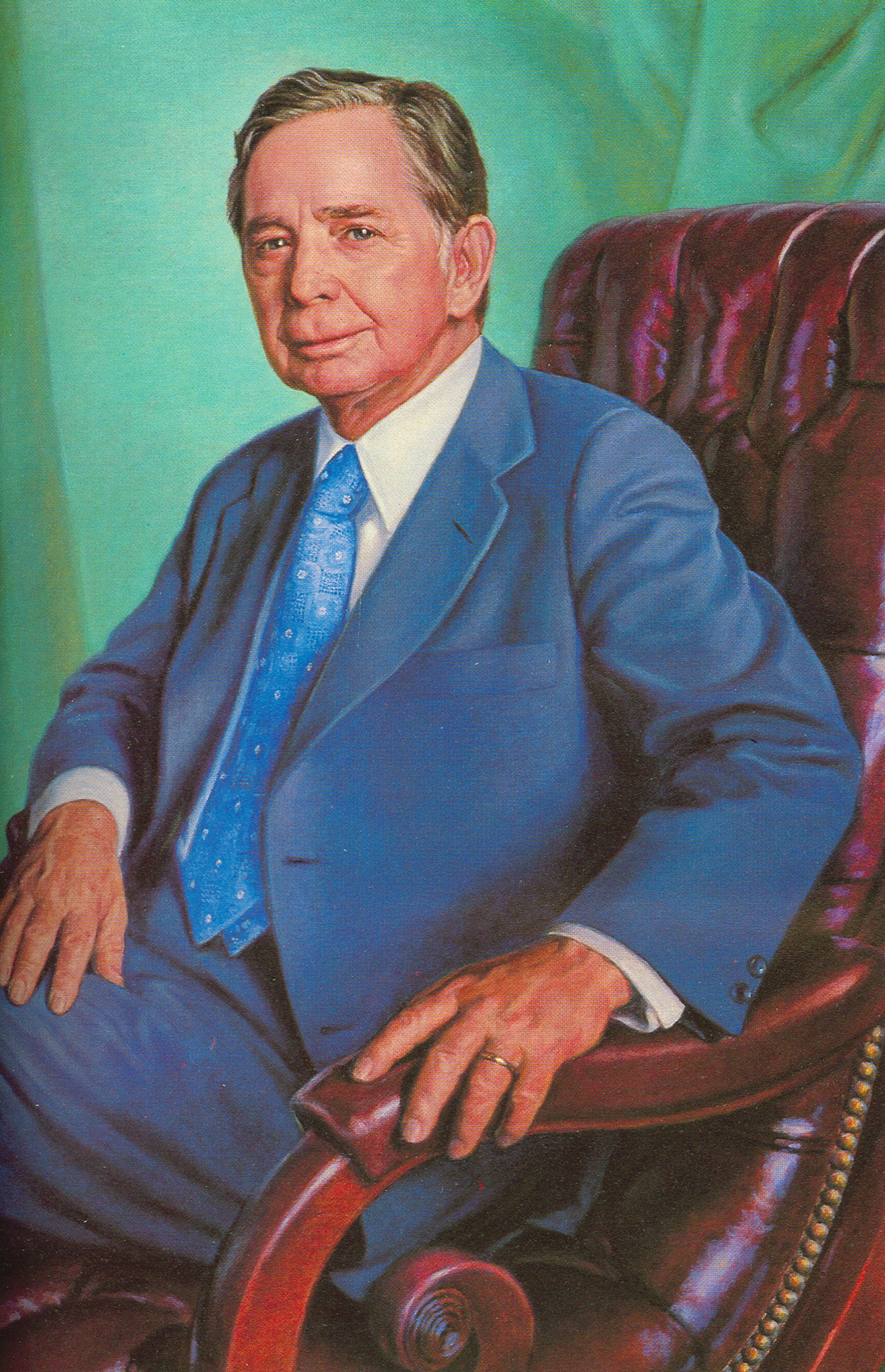
House Majority Leader Carl Albert

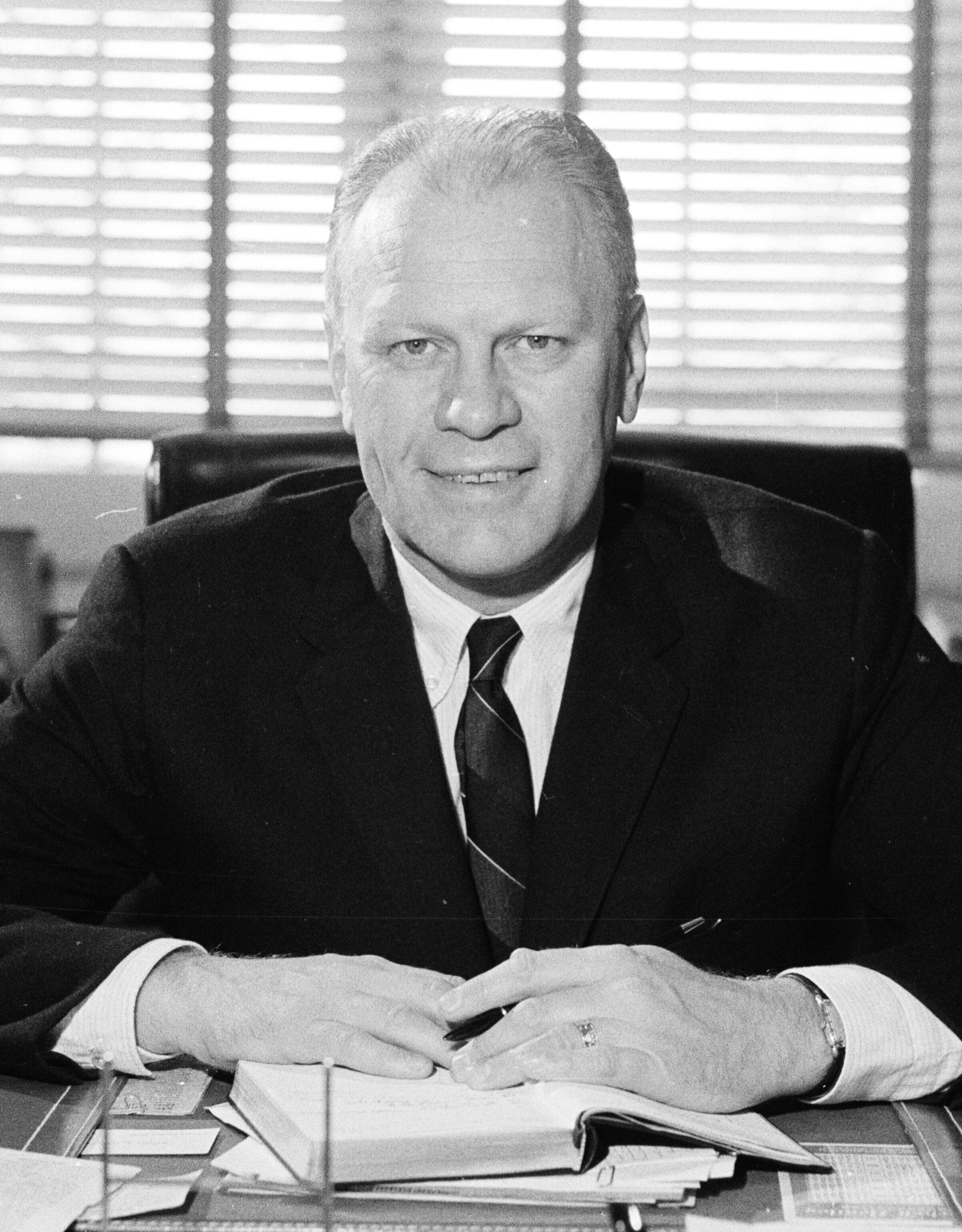
House Minority Leader Gerald Ford

== Changes in membership ==
The count below reflects changes from the beginning of the first session of this Congress.

=== Senate ===
- Replacements: 4
  - Democratic: 2 seat net loss
  - Republican: 2 seat net gain
- Deaths: 2
- Resignations: 2
- Total seats with changes: 5

Senate changes
| State (class) | Vacated by | Reason for change | Successor | Date of successor's formal installation (Note: When seated or oath administered, not necessarily when service began.) |
|---|---|---|---|---|
| Oregon (2) | Vacant | Delayed taking seat to finish term as Governor of Oregon. | Mark Hatfield (R) | January 10, 1967 |
| New York (1) | Robert F. Kennedy (D) | Assassinated June 6, 1968, while campaigning for the Democratic presidential nomination. Successor was appointed to continue the term. | Charles Goodell (R) | September 10, 1968 |
| Alaska (2) | Bob Bartlett (D) | Died December 11, 1968; Successor was appointed to continue the term. | Ted Stevens (R) | December 24, 1968 |
| Kentucky (3) | Thruston Ballard Morton (R) | Resigned December 16, 1968, to give successor preferential seniority, having already retired. Successor was appointed to finish the term, having already been elected to the next term. | Marlow Cook (R) | December 17, 1968 |
| Missouri (3) | Edward V. Long (D) | Resigned December 27, 1968, having lost renomination to the next term. Successor was appointed to finish the term, having already been elected to the next term. | Thomas Eagleton (D) | December 28, 1968 |

=== House of Representatives ===
- Replacements: 6
  - Democratic: 1 seat net loss
  - Republican: 1 seat net gain
- Deaths: 4
- Resignations: 4
- Expulsion: 1
- Total seats with changes: 9

House changes
| District | Vacated by | Reason for change | Successor | Date of successor's formal installation |
|---|---|---|---|---|
| Rhode Island 2nd | John E. Fogarty (D) | Died January 10, 1967 | Robert Tiernan (D) | March 28, 1967 |
| New York 18th | Adam Clayton Powell Jr. (D) | Excluded from House February 28, 1967, pursuant to H. Res. 278 | Adam Clayton Powell Jr. (D) | April 11, 1967 |
| California 11th | J. Arthur Younger (R) | Died June 20, 1967 | Pete McCloskey (R) | December 12, 1967 |
| New York 13th | Abraham J. Multer (D) | Resigned December 31, 1967, after being elected as judge of New York Supreme Court | Bertram L. Podell (D) | February 20, 1968 |
| Mississippi 3rd | John Bell Williams (D) | Resigned January 16, 1968, after being elected Governor of Mississippi | Charles H. Griffin (D) | March 12, 1968 |
| Texas 3rd | Joe R. Pool (D) | Died July 14, 1968 | James M. Collins (R) | August 24, 1968 |
| Pennsylvania 20th | Elmer J. Holland (D) | Died August 9, 1968 | Joseph M. Gaydos (D) | November 5, 1968 |
| New York 38th | Charles Goodell (R) | Resigned September 9, 1968, after becoming U.S. Senator | Vacant | Not filled this term |
| New York 24th | Paul A. Fino (R) | Resigned December 31, 1968 | Vacant | Not filled this term |

== Committees ==
Lists of committees and their party leaders for members of the House and Senate committees can be found through the Official Congressional Directory at the bottom of this article. The directory after the pages of terms of service lists committees of the Senate, House (Standing with Subcommittees, Select and Special) and Joint and, after that, House/Senate committee assignments. On the committees section of the House and Senate in the Official Congressional Directory, the committee's members on the first row on the left side shows the chairman of the committee and on the right side shows the ranking member of the committee.

=== Senate ===
- Aeronautical and Space Sciences (Chair: Clinton P. Anderson; Ranking Member: Margaret Chase Smith)
- Agriculture and Forestry (Chair: Allen J. Ellender; Ranking Member: George D. Aiken)
- Appropriations (Chair: Carl Hayden; Ranking Member: Milton R. Young)
- Armed Services (Chair: Richard B. Russell; Ranking Member: Margaret Chase Smith)
- Banking and Currency (Chair: John J. Sparkman; Ranking Member: Wallace F. Bennett)
- Commerce (Chair: Warren G. Magnuson; Ranking Member: Norris Cotton)
- District of Columbia (Chair: Alan Bible; Ranking Member: Winston L. Prouty)
- Finance (Chair: Russell B. Long; Ranking Member: John J. Williams)
- Foreign Relations (Chair: J. William Fulbright; Ranking Member: Bourke B. Hickenlooper)
- Government Operations (Chair: John Little McClellan; Ranking Member: Karl E. Mundt)
- Interior and Insular Affairs (Chair: Henry M. Jackson; Ranking Member: Thomas H. Kuchel)
- Judiciary (Chair: James O. Eastland; Ranking Member: Everett Dirksen)
- Nutrition and Human Needs (Select) (Chair: George S. McGovern; Ranking Member: )
- Organization of Congress (Select) (Chair: [data missing]; Ranking Member: [data missing])
- Post Office and Civil Service (Chair: Mike Monroney; Ranking Member: Frank Carlson)
- Public Works (Chair: Jennings Randolph; Ranking Member: John Sherman Cooper)
- Rules and Administration (Chair: B. Everett Jordan; Ranking Member: Carl T. Curtis)
- Small Business (Select) (Chair: George A. Smathers)
- Standards and Conduct (Select) (Chair: John C. Stennis)
- Whole

=== House of Representatives ===
- Agriculture (Chair: William R. Poage; Ranking Member: Page Belcher)
- Appropriations (Chair: George H. Mahon; Ranking Member: Frank T. Bow)
- Armed Services (Chair: L. Mendel Rivers; Ranking Member: William H. Bates)
- Banking and Currency (Chair: Wright Patman; Ranking Member: William B. Widnall)
- District of Columbia (Chair: John L. McMillan; Ranking Member: Ancher Nelsen)
- Education and Labor (Chair: Carl D. Perkins; Ranking Member: William H. Ayres)
- Foreign Affairs (Chair: Thomas E. Morgan; Ranking Member: Frances P. Bolton)
- Government Operations (Chair: William L. Dawson; Ranking Member: Florence P. Dwyer)
- House Administration (Chair: Omar Burleson; Ranking Member: Glenard P. Lipscomb)
- House Beauty Shop (Select) (Chair: Martha W. Griffiths)
- Interior and Insular Affairs (Chair: Wayne N. Aspinall; Ranking Member: John P. Saylor)
- Interstate and Foreign Commerce (Chair: Harley O. Staggers; Ranking Member: William L. Springer)
- Judiciary (Chair: Emanuel Celler; Ranking Member: William M. McCulloch)
- Merchant Marine and Fisheries (Chair: Edward A. Garmatz; Ranking Member: William S. Mailliard)
- Post Office and Civil Service (Chair: Thaddeus J. Dulski; Ranking Member: Robert J. Corbett)
- Public Works (Chair: George Hyde Fallon; Ranking Member: William C. Cramer)
- Rules (Chair: William M. Colmer; Ranking Member: H. Allen Smith)
- Science and Astronautics (Chair: George Paul Miller; Ranking Member: James G. Fulton)
- Small Business (Select) (Chair: Joe L. Evins)
- Standards of Official Conduct (Chair: Charles Melvin Price)
- Un-American Activities (Chair: Edwin E. Willis; Ranking Member: John M. Ashbrook)
- Veterans' Affairs (Chair: Olin E. Teague; Ranking Member: E. Ross Adair)
- Ways and Means (Chair: Wilbur D. Mills; Ranking Member: John W. Byrnes)
- Whole

=== Joint committees ===
- Atomic Energy (Chair: Sen. John O. Pastore; Vice Chair: Rep. Chet Holifield)
- Conditions of Indian Tribes (Special) (Chair: [data missing]; Vice Chair: [data missing])
- Defense Production (Chair: Rep. Wright Patman; Vice Chair: Sen. John J. Sparkman)
- Disposition of Executive Papers
- Economic (Chair: Sen. William Proxmire; Vice Chair: Rep. Wright Patman)
- Immigration and Nationality Policy (Chair: Rep. Michael A. Feighan)
- Legislative Budget
- The Library (Chair: Sen. B. Everett Jordan; Vice Chair: Rep. Omar Burleson)
- Navajo-Hopi Indian Administration
- Printing (Chair: Sen. Carl Hayden; Vice Chair: Rep. Omar Burleson)
- Reduction of Nonessential Federal Expenditures (Chair: Rep. George H. Mahon)
- Taxation (Chair: Rep. Wilbur D. Mills; Vice Chair: Sen. Russell B. Long)

== Employees ==
=== Legislative branch agency directors ===
- Architect of the Capitol: J. George Stewart
- Attending Physician of the United States Congress: Rufus Pearson
- Comptroller General of the United States: Elmer B. Staats
- Librarian of Congress: Lawrence Quincy Mumford
- Public Printer of the United States: James L. Harrison

=== Senate ===
- Chaplain: Frederick Brown Harris (Methodist)
- Curator: Joseph Dougherty, until 1968
  - Richard A. Baker (acting), from 1968
- Parliamentarian: Floyd Riddick
- Secretary: Francis R. Valeo
- Librarian: Richard D. Hupman
- Democratic Party Secretary: J. Stanley Kimmitt
- Republican Party Secretary: J. Mark Trice
- Sergeant at Arms: Robert G. Dunphy

=== House of Representatives ===
- Chaplain: Edward G. Latch (Methodist)
- Clerk: W. Pat Jennings
- Doorkeeper: William M. Miller
- Parliamentarian: Lewis Deschler
- Postmaster: H. H. Morris
- Reading Clerks: Charles W. Hackney Jr. (D) and Joe Bartlett (R)
- Sergeant at Arms: Zeake W. Johnson Jr.

== See also ==
- List of new members of the 90th United States Congress
- 1966 United States elections (elections leading to this Congress)
  - 1966 United States Senate elections
  - 1966 United States House of Representatives elections
- 1968 United States elections (elections during this Congress, leading to the next Congress)
  - 1968 United States presidential election
  - 1968 United States Senate elections
  - 1968 United States House of Representatives elections
