= Charles H. Griffin =

American politician (1926–1989)

Charles Griffin
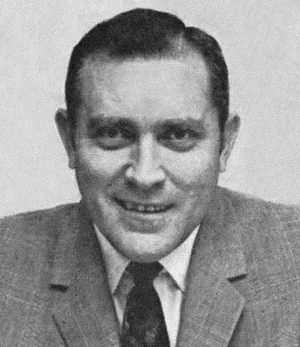

Member of the U.S. House of Representatives from Mississippi's 3rd District
- In office March 12, 1968 – January 3, 1973
- Preceded by: John Bell Williams
- Succeeded by: Thad Cochran (Redistricting)

Personal details
- Born: Charles Hudson Griffin; May 9, 1926 Utica, Mississippi, U.S.
- Died: September 10, 1989 (aged 63) Utica, Mississippi, U.S.
- Relations: Isaac Griffin (great-great-grandfather)
- Education: Mississippi State University

Military service
- Branch/service: United States Navy
- Battles/wars: World War II

Charles Hudson Griffin (May 9, 1926 – September 10, 1989) was an American World War II veteran and politician who served three terms as a member of the United States House of Representatives from Mississippi's 3rd congressional district from 1968 to 1973.

== Early life and education ==
Griffin was born on a farm near Utica, Mississippi. He attended Utica High School and Hinds Community College before graduating from Mississippi State University in 1949. Griffin was the great-great-grandson of Isaac Griffin, a Congressman from Pennsylvania.

=== World War II ===
He served in the United States Navy from 1944 to 1946 in Pacific War as a third class apprentice seaman and quartermaster.

== Career ==
Griffin served as assistant to United States Representative John Bell Williams from July 1, 1949, to January 15, 1968.

=== Congress ===
Griffin was elected as a Democrat to the Ninetieth Congress in a special election triggered by Williams' successful bid for governor of Mississippi. He was reelected to the two succeeding Congresses, serving from March 12, 1968, to January 3, 1973.

He was not a candidate for reelection to the Ninety-third Congress in 1972.

=== Later career ===
He then served as the Secretary of the Mississippi State senate from 1980 to 1989.

== Personal life ==
He was a resident of Utica, Mississippi, until his death there on September 10, 1989.

U.S. House of Representatives
Preceded by John B. Williams	Member of the U.S. House of Representatives from Mississippi's 3rd congressional district 1968-1973	Succeeded by Sonny Montgomery
