= Sonny Montgomery =

American general and politician (1920–2006)

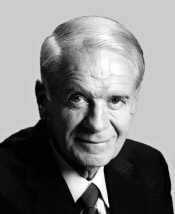

Member of the U.S. House of Representatives from Mississippi
- In office January 3, 1967 – January 3, 1997
- Preceded by: Prentiss Walker
- Succeeded by: Chip Pickering
- Constituency: 4th district (1967–1973); 3rd district (1973–1997)

Chair of the House Veterans' Affairs Committee
- In office January 3, 1981 – January 3, 1995
- Preceded by: Ray Roberts
- Succeeded by: Bob Stump

Member of the Mississippi State Senate
- In office November 21, 1956–December 1, 1966
- Preceded by: William J. Gunn Jr.
- Succeeded by: Fred M. Rogers

Personal details
- Born: Gillespie V. Montgomery; August 5, 1920 Meridian, Mississippi, U.S.
- Died: May 12, 2006 (aged 85) Meridian, Mississippi, U.S.
- Party: Democratic
- Education: Mississippi State University (BA)

Military service
- Allegiance: United States
- Branch/service: United States Army
- Years of service: 1943–1980
- Rank: Major General
- Unit: Mississippi Army National Guard
- Battles/wars: World War II; Korean War
- Sonny Montgomery's voice Montgomery, as chair of the House Veterans' Affairs Committee, presents legislation to reform the U.S. Court of Veterans Appeals; Recorded February 20, 1991

Gillespie V. "Sonny" Montgomery (August 5, 1920 – May 12, 2006) was an American soldier and politician from Mississippi who served in the Mississippi Senate and United States House of Representatives from 1967 to 1997. He was also a retired major general of the Mississippi National Guard who served during World War II.

== Early life ==
Born in Meridian, Mississippi, Montgomery graduated from McCallie School and Mississippi State University in Starkville in 1943. While in college, Montgomery joined the Beta Tau chapter of Kappa Alpha Order.

== Military service ==
A 1943 Reserve Officers' Training Corps graduate, Gillespie was commissioned as a second lieutenant in the United States Army. He served with the 12th Armored Division in Europe during World War II. He served on active duty again during Korean War, this time as a member of the 31st Infantry Division. Montgomery was a member of the Mississippi Army National Guard until 1980, and retired as a major general. For his military service, Montgomery received the Legion of Merit, Bronze Star Medal with "V" for Valor device, Army Commendation Medal and Combat Infantryman Badge.

== Business career ==
Before running for Congress, he owned his own insurance company, the Montgomery Insurance Agency. In addition, he served as vice president of the Greater Mississippi Life Insurance Company of Meridian, Mississippi.

== U.S. House of Representatives ==
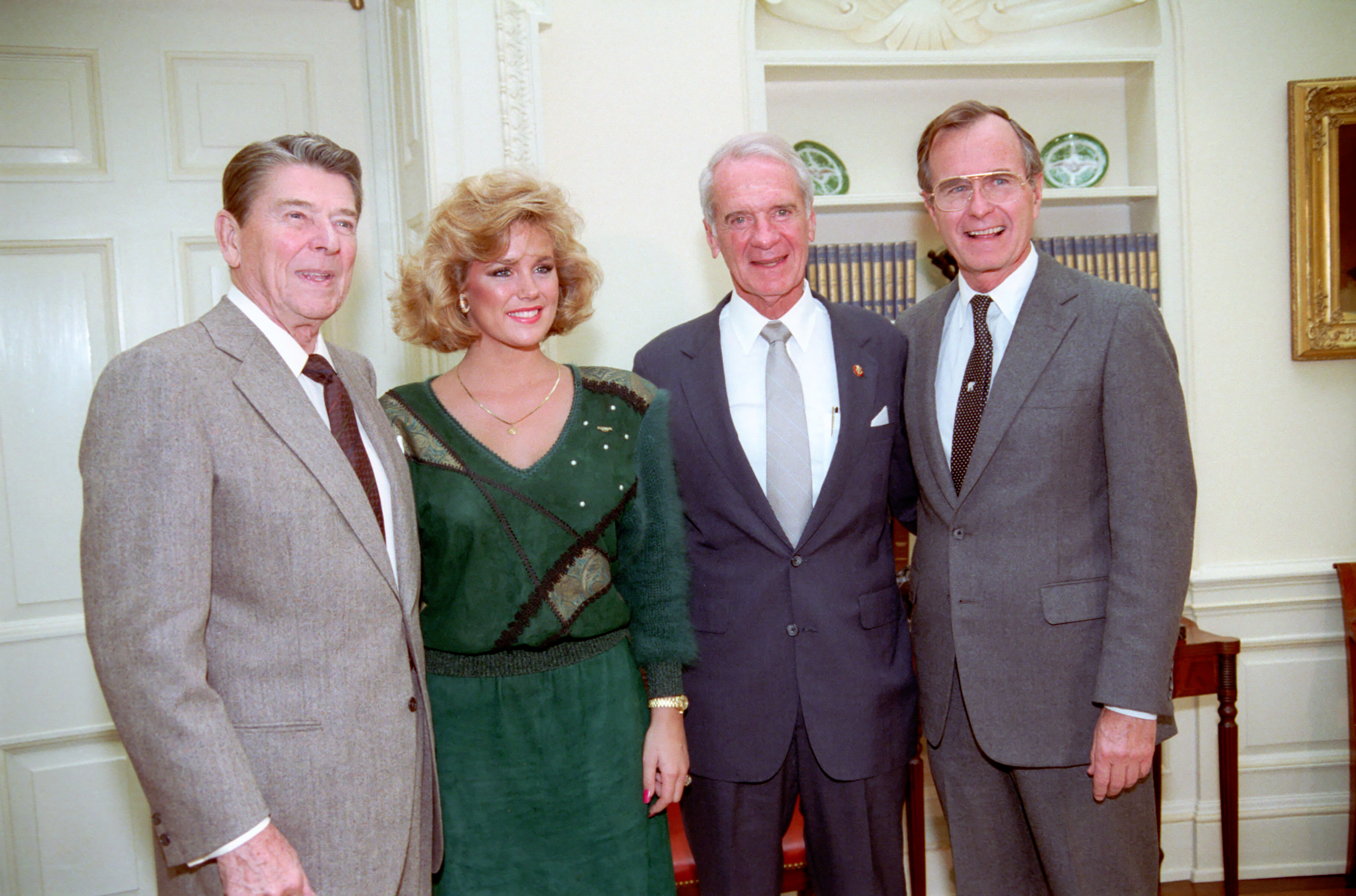
Montgomery with President Ronald Reagan, Vice President George H. W. Bush, and Susan Akin in 1985

=== Committee assignments ===
- Chairman, Select Committee on Military Involvement in Southeast Asia (Ninety-first Congress)
- Chairman, Select Committee on Missing in Action in Southeast Asia (Ninety-fourth Congress)
- Chairman, House Veterans' Affairs Committee (Ninety-seventh through One Hundred Third Congresses)

=== Elections ===
Montgomery represented part of Meridian in the Mississippi State Senate between 1956 and 1966. He was elected to Congress from what was then the 4th District in 1966. Prentiss Walker, the first Republican elected to either house of Congress from Mississippi since Reconstruction, had given up the seat after one term to run for the United States Senate against James Eastland.

Montgomery was one of the more conservative Democrats in the House, and was known for being more "hawkish" than other members of his party. He was very popular in his district, usually winning reelection by some of the highest margins in the country. Although the district's voters were increasingly willing to vote Republican at the national level (it has only supported the official Democratic candidate for president once since 1956), at the local level Montgomery usually faced "sacrificial lamb" opponents on the few occasions he faced any Republican opposition at all. Montgomery ran unopposed from 1970 to 1974, in 1980, and from 1984 to 1990. In four elections—1972, 1980, 1984 and 1988—Montgomery ran unopposed even as the Republican presidential candidate carried the district in a landslide. Observers assumed that Montgomery would be succeeded by a Republican after he retired, given the crossover of conservative white voters from the Democratic Party to the GOP in the second half of the 20th century. As it turned out, when Montgomery retired in 1996, the district was taken by Republican Chip Pickering in a landslide. The Democrats have only put up a candidate in the district four times since then, and have only won more than 35 percent of the vote once.

=== Tenure ===
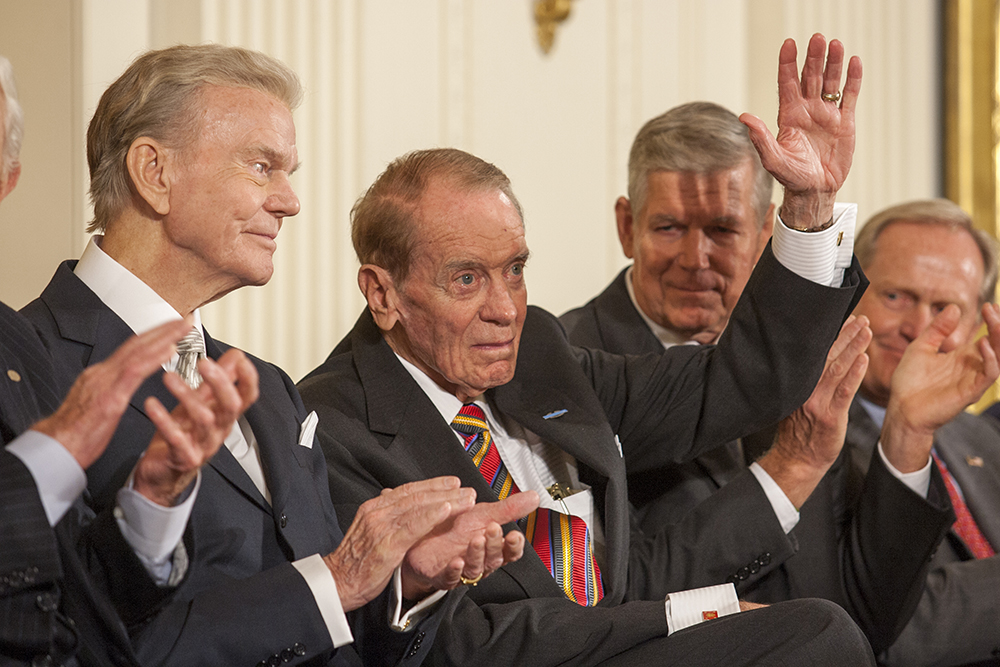
Congressman Sonny Montgomery (second from left) receives the Presidential Medal of Freedom.

During his time in Congress, Montgomery was one of only three representatives who voted to reject the Judiciary Committee's report on the Watergate scandal following Richard Nixon's resignation; Montgomery joined Earl Landgrebe and Otto Passman as the three opposed compared to 412 in favor.

He was the author of the G.I. Bill of Rights that gives members of the service money to pay for college and was a lead sponsor in establishing the Veterans Affairs cabinet-level position. Montgomery gave a speech on the House floor in April 1975 in which he spoke against foreign aid to South Vietnam and said, "The South Vietnamese can blame only themselves for their present situation."

Montgomery's greatest legislative victory was the enactment of the bill that bears his name: the Montgomery G.I. Bill. In 1981, he came to the forefront to lead the fight for passage of a new G.I. Bill. As a World War II veteran, he believed that the country should provide educational benefits to its service members and that the combination of military service and a college degree would make these individuals valuable assets to the country. He also wanted to reverse the Department of Defense's declining recruitment efforts, which had dropped sharply in the 1980s, and improve the overall quality of the volunteers. Nearly half of those recruited during that time lacked high-school diplomas and the basic skills needed in a modern military. Montgomery saw that educational shortfall as a direct threat to America's military readiness and national security.

As Veterans' Affairs Committee chairman, Montgomery led opposition to the Kerry-Daschle bill (Agent Orange Disabilities Act of 1987, S.1787) that would have required the VA to begin compensating veterans who contracted non-Hodgkin lymphoma and lung cancer a presumed service-connected disease. Montgomery asserted that "further studies were needed to prove a connection between various diseases and Agent Orange before the government should be held liable for disability benefits" despite the existence of several such studies by the National Cancer Institute, the VA and the New Jersey Agent Orange Commission which were published in the The Journal of the American Medical Association (JAMA). Subsequent scientific studies made connections between Agent Orange, Vietnam veterans' illnesses and the increased birth defects of their children. In 1991, Montgomery stood behind president George H. W. Bush at the signing of the Agent Orange Act. He had opposed a similar bill the previous year. After years of opposing Vietnam Veterans receiving disability for exposure to Agent Orange, he now appeared as their champion. In the same year he authored the Montgomery Amendment to the National Defense Authorization Act for Fiscal Year 1987, which effectively transferred control of the National Guard away from the states and to the Department of Defense by prohibiting state governors from withholding National Guard forces.

On September 13, 1988, Montgomery became the first congressman to lead the House in reciting the Pledge of Allegiance as a permanent part of its daily and morning business operations. The day prior to his death, Congressman Gene Taylor introduced an amendment to a House Defense Appropriations Bill to rename the bill the Sonny Montgomery National Defense Authorization Act for Fiscal Year 2007. Following his death, the James F. Webb Funeral Home in Meridian, Mississippi performed the funeral services. President George W. Bush ordered U.S. flags to be flown at half-staff. In addition, the U.S. House of Representatives canceled non-suspension votes on the day of his funeral. Montgomery was buried in Magnolia Cemetery in Meridian, Mississippi.

Montgomery was a delegate to Democratic National Convention from Mississippi in 1996. On November 10, 2005, he was awarded the Presidential Medal of Freedom, the highest American civilian honor, by President George W. Bush. Montgomery had played paddleball with Bush's father.

== Memorials ==
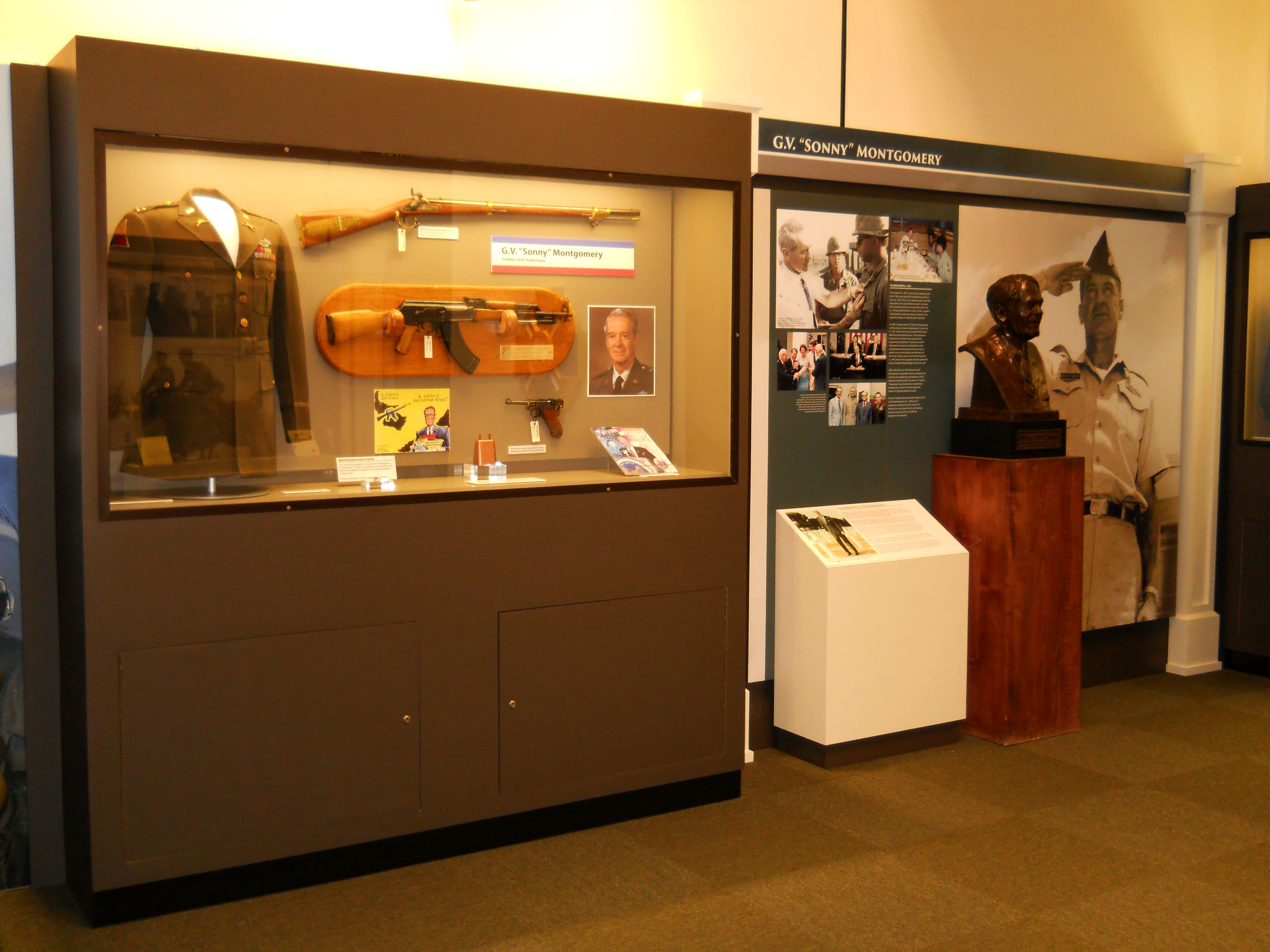
G.V. "Sonny" Montgomery Exhibit at the Mississippi Armed Forces Museum

- A statue of Montgomery on the campus of Mississippi State University where he was Student Association President for the 1942–43 school year. A bust of him is located in the campus library and a duplicate bust is located at the Mississippi Armed Forces Museum at Camp Shelby alongside Congressman Montgomery's personal effects from his military service in the Second World War and National Guard.

A number of public projects have been named in his honor, including:

- The VA Hospital in Jackson, Mississippi
- The G. V. Montgomery Lock on the Tennessee-Tombigbee Waterway
- The G. V. "Sonny" Montgomery Naval Reserve Center at NAS Meridian in Meridian, Mississippi
- The G. V. Montgomery Airport in Forest, Mississippi
- A Mississippi Air National Guard C-17 Globemaster III was named “The Spirit of G.V. ‘Sonny’ Montgomery.” Montgomery became the third person in the United States to have a military fleet named in his honor.
- The G.V. "Sonny" Montgomery Center for America's Veterans at Mississippi State University in Starkville, Mississippi.
- The G.V. "Sonny" Montgomery Advisement and Career Services Center at Mississippi State University's Meridian, Mississippi College Park campus.
- The G. V. "Sonny" Montgomery Conference and Special Events Room at the U.S. Department of Veterans Affairs Central Office building in Washington, D.C.
- The G. V. "Sonny" Montgomery National Guard Complex in Meridian, Mississippi

U.S. House of Representatives
Preceded by Prentiss Walker	Member of the U.S. House of Representatives from Mississippi's 4th congressional district 1967–1973	Succeeded by Thad Cochran
Preceded by Charles H. Griffin	Member of the U.S. House of Representatives from Mississippi's 3rd congressional district 1973–1997	Succeeded by Chip Pickering
Political offices
Preceded by Ray Roberts; Texas	Chairman of the House Veterans' Affairs Committee; 1981–1995	Succeeded by Bob Stump; Arizona
Preceded by Bob Stump; Arizona	Ranking Member of the House Veterans' Affairs Committee; 1995–1997	Succeeded by Lane Evans; Illinois
