= 1968 United States House of Representatives elections =

House elections for the 91st U.S. Congress

- November 5, 1968

All 435 seats in the United States House of Representatives 218 seats needed for a majority
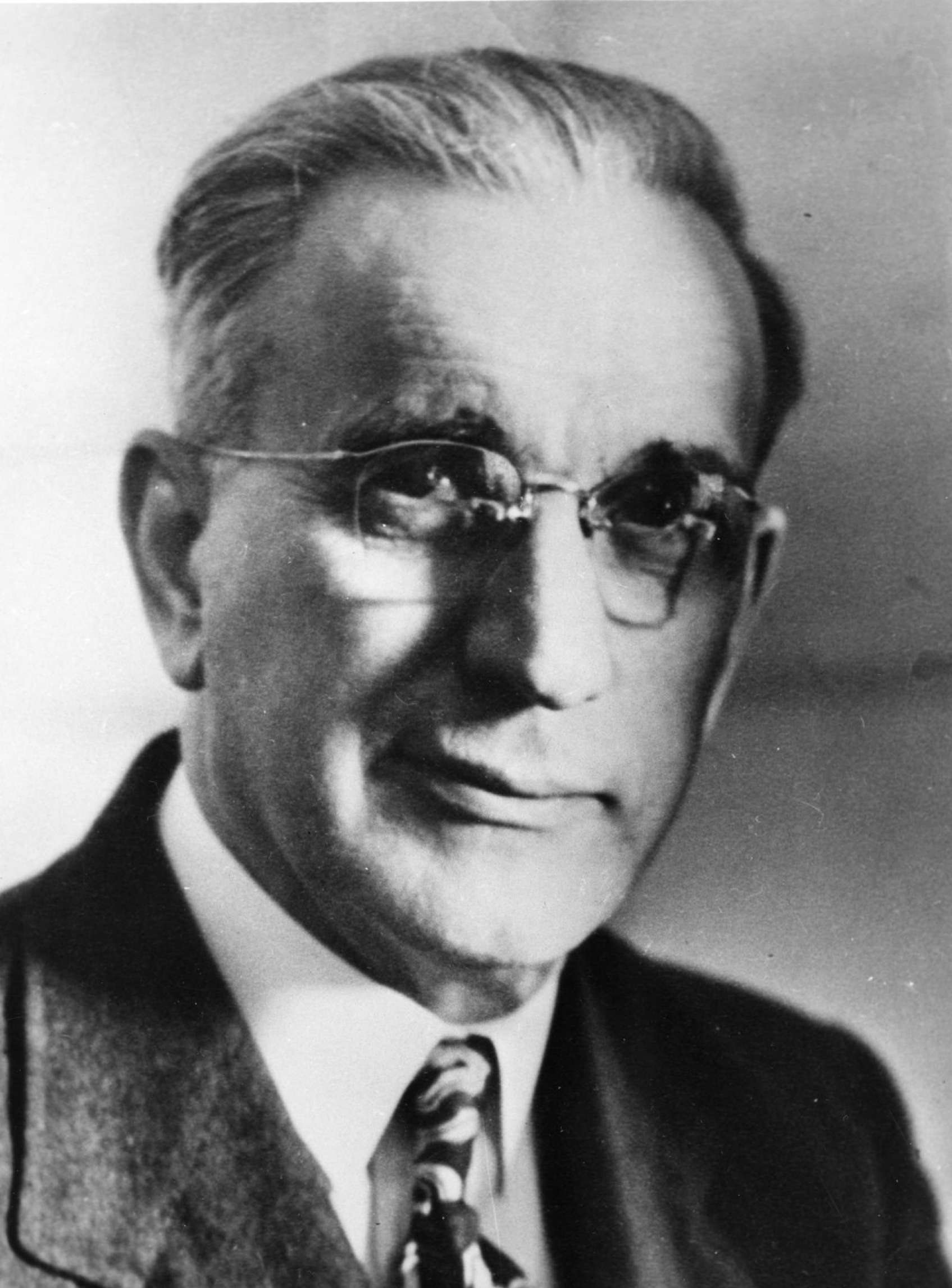

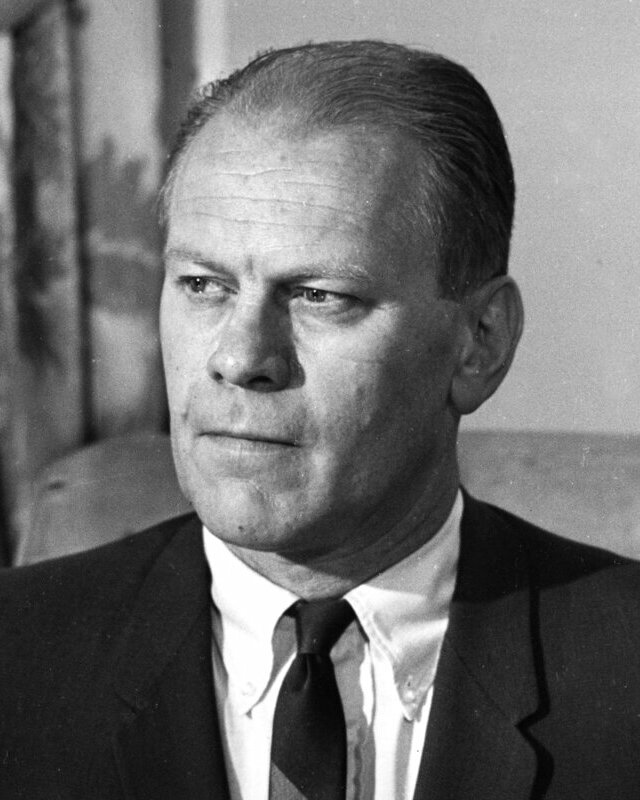
	Majority party	Minority party
Leader	John McCormack	Gerald Ford
Party	Democratic	Republican
Leader since	January 10, 1962	January 3, 1965
Leader's seat	Massachusetts 9th	Michigan 5th
Last election	248 seats	187 seats
Seats won	243	192
Seat change	▼5	▲5
Popular vote	33,214,994	32,059,047
Percentage	50.2%	48.5%
Swing	▼0.7pp	▲0.3pp
- Results: Democratic hold Democratic gain Republican hold Republican gain
Speaker before election
John McCormack
Democratic
Elected Speaker
John McCormack
Democratic

The 1968 United States House of Representatives elections were elections for the United States House of Representatives on November 5, 1968, to elect members to serve in the 91st United States Congress. They coincided with Richard M. Nixon's election as president. Nixon's narrow victory yielded only limited gains for his Republican Party, which picked up a net of five seats from the Democratic Party. The Democrats retained a majority in the House.

As of 2026, this is the last time a former Representative from one state was elected to represent a district in another state during their career. In this case, Ed Foreman, who represented Texas's 16th congressional district for a single term from 1963 to 1965, was elected to represent New Mexico's 2nd congressional district.

== Overall results ==
409 incumbent members sought reelection, but 4 were defeated in primaries and 9 defeated in the general election for a total of 396 incumbents winning.

↓
243	192
Democratic	Republican

Summary of the November 5, 1968 election results

Parties	Seats				Popular Vote		
Parties	1966	1968	Change	Strength	Vote	%	Change
Democratic Party	248	243	▼5	55.9%	33,214,994	50.2%	▼0.7%
Republican Party	187	192	▲5	44.1%	32,059,047	48.5%	▲0.3%
Conservative Party	Steady	Steady	Steady	Steady	256,498	0.4%	Steady
American Independent Party	Steady	Steady	Steady	Steady	171,422	0.3%	▲0.3%
Liberal Party	Steady	Steady	Steady	Steady	85,462	0.1%	Steady
National Democratic Party	Steady	Steady	Steady	Steady	83,818	0.1%	▲0.1%
Independent	Steady	Steady	Steady	Steady	75,515	0.1%	▼0.1%
Constitution Party	Steady	Steady	Steady	Steady	58,209	0.1%	▲0.1%
Peace and Freedom Party	Steady	Steady	Steady	Steady	57,468	0.1%	▲0.1%
Voice of Independence Party	Steady	Steady	Steady	Steady	9,399	<0.1%	Steady
No Additional Taxes Party	Steady	Steady	Steady	Steady	8,493	<0.1%	Steady
Socialist Labor Party	Steady	Steady	Steady	Steady	7,126	<0.1%	Steady
New Party	Steady	Steady	Steady	Steady	4,534	<0.1%	Steady
Socialist Workers Party	Steady	Steady	Steady	Steady	3,127	<0.1%	Steady
De-escalators Party	Steady	Steady	Steady	Steady	2,798	<0.1%	Steady
Common Sense Party	Steady	Steady	Steady	Steady	2,749	<0.1%	Steady
American Anti-Communist Party	Steady	Steady	Steady	Steady	1,721	<0.1%	Steady
Independent's Choice Party	Steady	Steady	Steady	Steady	1,314	<0.1%	Steady
Abolish Port Authority Party	Steady	Steady	Steady	Steady	1,072	<0.1%	Steady
New Politics Party	Steady	Steady	Steady	Steady	795	<0.1%	Steady
Primary Party	Steady	Steady	Steady	Steady	572	<0.1%	Steady
Prohibition Party	Steady	Steady	Steady	Steady	351	<0.1%	Steady
Others	Steady	Steady	Steady	Steady	2,725	<0.1%	▼0.1%
Total	435	435	——	100.0%	66,109,209	100.0%	——
Source: Election Statistics - Office of the Clerk

Popular vote
Democratic	50.24%
Republican	48.49%
Others	1.27%

House seats
Democratic	55.86%
Republican	44.14%

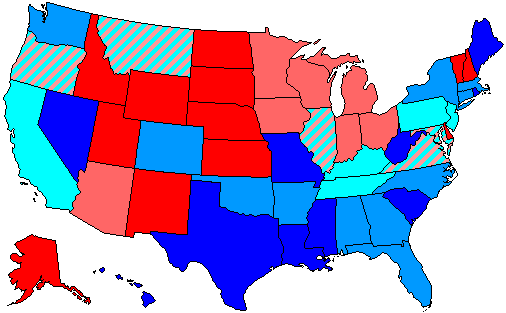
House seats by party holding plurality in state: 80.1-100% Democratic / 80.1-100% Republican; 60.1-80% Democratic / 60.1-80% Republican; ≤ 60% Democratic / ≤ 60% Republican

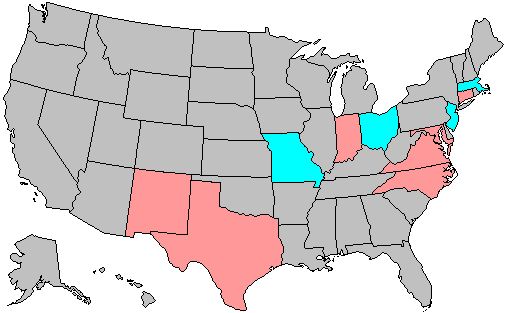
6+ Democratic gain / 6+ Republican gain; 3-5 Democratic gain / 3-5 Republican gain; 1-2 Democratic gain / 1-2 Republican gain; no net change

Results shaded according to winners share of vote

== Special elections ==
District	Incumbent	Party	First elected	Results	Candidates
New York 13	Abraham J. Multer	Democratic	1952	Incumbent resigned December 31, 1967 to become Justice of the New York Supreme Court. New member elected February 20, 1968. Democratic hold; winner was subsequently re-elected.	▌ ✓ Bertram L. Podell (Democratic) 49.7%; ▌Melvin Dubin (New Leadership) 38.4%; ▌Gerald S. Held (Republican) 6.7%; ▌Michael Ajello (Conservative) 5.2%
Mississippi 3	John Bell Williams	Democratic	1962	Incumbent resigned January 16, 1968 to become Governor of Mississippi. New member elected March 12, 1968. Democratic hold; winner was subsequently re-elected.	▌ ✓ Charles H. Griffin (Democratic) 67%; ▌Charles Evers (Democratic) 33.1%
Texas 3	Joe R. Pool	Democratic	1962	Incumbent died July 14, 1968. New member elected August 24, 1968. Republican gain; winner was subsequently re-elected.	▌ ✓ James M. Collins (Republican) 60%; ▌Elizabeth Pool (Democratic) 40%

== Alabama ==
District	Incumbent	Party	First elected	Result	Candidates
Alabama 1	Jack Edwards	Republican	1964	Incumbent re-elected.	▌ ✓ Jack Edwards (Republican) 57.1%; ▌Arnold D. Debrow (Democratic) 38.4%; ▌Noble Beasley (Nat Dem) 4.4%; ▌Darius K. Rosco (Independent) 0.02%
Alabama 2	William L. Dickinson	Republican	1964	Incumbent re-elected.	▌ ✓ William L. Dickinson (Republican) 55.4%; ▌Robert F. Whaley (Democratic) 34.2%; ▌Richard Boone (Nat Dem) 10.4%
Alabama 3	George W. Andrews	Democratic	1944	Incumbent re-elected.	▌ ✓ George W. Andrews (Democratic) 90.8%; ▌Wilbur Johnston (Nat Dem) 8.4%; ▌Ralph Price (Independent) 0.8%
Alabama 4	Bill Nichols	Democratic	1966	Incumbent re-elected.	▌ ✓ Bill Nichols (Democratic) 80.0%; ▌Robert M. Kerr (Republican) 11.5%; ▌T. J. Clemons (Nat Dem) 8.5%
Alabama 5	Armistead I. Selden Jr.	Democratic	1952	Incumbent retired to run for U.S. senator. Democratic hold.	▌ ✓ Walter Flowers (Democratic) 56.2%; ▌William McKinley Branch (Nat Dem) 22.8%; ▌Frank Donaldson (Republican) 11.9%; ▌Mike Simpson (Independent) 7.7%; ▌W. C. Gibbs (Conservative) 1.0%; ▌Richard Delaney (Independent) 0.4%
Alabama 6	John H. Buchanan Jr.	Republican	1964	Incumbent re-elected.	▌ ✓ John H. Buchanan Jr. (Republican) 59.3%; ▌Quinton R. Bowers (Democratic) 29.6%; ▌Thomas Wrenn (Nat Dem) 11.1%
Alabama 7	Tom Bevill	Democratic	1966	Incumbent re-elected.	▌ ✓ Tom Bevill (Democratic) 76.1%; ▌Jodie Connell (Republican) 21.5%; ▌James Bane (Nat Dem) 1.6%; ▌A. V. Stone (American Independent) 0.8%
Alabama 8	Robert E. Jones Jr.	Democratic	1947 (Special)	Incumbent re-elected.	▌ ✓ Robert E. Jones Jr. (Democratic) 76.1%; ▌Ken Hearn (Conservative) 15.0%; ▌Charlie Burgess (Nat Dem) 6.3%; ▌Richard J. Pella (American Independent) 2.6%

== Alaska ==
District	Incumbent	Party	First elected	Result	Candidates
Alaska at-large	Howard Pollock	Republican	1966	Incumbent re-elected.	▌ ✓ Howard Pollock (Republican) 54.2%; ▌Nick Begich (Democratic) 45.8%

== Arizona ==
District	Incumbent	Party	First elected	Result	Candidates
Arizona 1	John Jacob Rhodes	Republican	1952	Incumbent re-elected.	▌ ✓ John Jacob Rhodes (Republican) 71.6%; ▌Robert E. Miller (Democratic) 28.4%
Arizona 2	Mo Udall	Democratic	1961 (special)	Incumbent re-elected.	▌ ✓ Mo Udall (Democratic) 70.3%; ▌G. Alfred McGinnis (Republican) 29.7%
Arizona 3	Sam Steiger	Republican	1966	Incumbent re-elected.	▌ ✓ Sam Steiger (Republican) 63.4%; ▌Ralph Watkins Jr. (Democratic) 36.6%

== Arkansas ==
District	Incumbent	Party	First elected	Result	Candidates
Arkansas 1	Ezekiel C. Gathings	Democratic	1938	Incumbent retired. Democratic hold.	▌ ✓ Bill Alexander (Democratic) 68.9%; ▌Guy Newcomb (Republican) 31.1%
Arkansas 2	Wilbur Mills	Democratic	1938	Incumbent re-elected.	▌ ✓ Wilbur Mills (Democratic); Unopposed
Arkansas 3	John Paul Hammerschmidt	Republican	1966	Incumbent re-elected.	▌ ✓ John Paul Hammerschmidt (Republican) 67.1%; ▌Hardy Croxton (Democratic) 32.9%
Arkansas 4	David Pryor	Democratic	1966	Incumbent re-elected.	▌ ✓ David Pryor (Democratic); Unopposed

== California ==
District	Incumbent	Party	First elected	Result	Candidates
California 1	Don Clausen	Republican	1963	Incumbent re-elected.	▌ ✓ Don Clausen (Republican) 75.1%; ▌Donald W. Graham (Democratic) 21.4%; ▌Adolph N. Hofmann (Peace and Freedom) 1.9%; ▌Gladys L. O'Neal (American Independent) 1.6%
California 2	Bizz Johnson	Democratic	1958	Incumbent re-elected.	▌ ✓ Bizz Johnson (Democratic) 60.8%; ▌Osmer E. Dunaway (Republican) 37.5%; ▌Paul J. Huft (American Independent) 1.7%
California 3	John E. Moss	Democratic	1952	Incumbent re-elected.	▌ ✓ John E. Moss (Democratic) 56.0%; ▌Elmore J. Duffy (Republican) 41.8%; ▌James T. Slaughter (American Independent) 2.2%
California 4	Robert L. Leggett	Democratic	1962	Incumbent re-elected.	▌ ✓ Robert L. Leggett (Democratic) 55.5%; ▌James Shumway (Republican) 41.6%; ▌Gene C. Clark (American Independent) 2.9%
California 5	Phillip Burton	Democratic	1964	Incumbent re-elected.	▌ ✓ Phillip Burton (Democratic) 72.0%; ▌Waldo Velasquez (Republican) 24.2%; ▌Marvin Garson (Peace and Freedom) 3.8%
California 6	William S. Mailliard	Republican	1952	Incumbent re-elected.	▌ ✓ William S. Mailliard (Republican) 72.8%; ▌Phillip Drath (Democratic) 27.2%
California 7	Jeffery Cohelan	Democratic	1958	Incumbent re-elected.	▌ ✓ Jeffery Cohelan (Democratic) 62.9%; ▌Barney E. Hilburn (Republican) 29.6%; ▌Huey P. Newton (Peace and Freedom) 7.5%
California 8	George P. Miller	Democratic	1944	Incumbent re-elected.	▌ ✓ George P. Miller (Democratic) 64.0%; ▌Raymond P. Britton (Republican) 36.0%
California 9	Don Edwards	Democratic	1962	Incumbent re-elected.	▌ ✓ Don Edwards (Democratic) 56.5%; ▌Larry Fargher (Republican) 43.5%
California 10	Charles S. Gubser	Republican	1952	Incumbent re-elected.	▌ ✓ Charles S. Gubser (Republican) 67.3%; ▌Grayson S. Taketa (Democratic) 30.9%; ▌Martin L. Primach (Peace and Freedom) 1.8%
California 11	Pete McCloskey	Republican	1967	Incumbent re-elected.	▌ ✓ Pete McCloskey (Republican) 79.3%; ▌Urban G. Whitaker Jr. (Democratic) 19.6%; ▌David D. Ransom (Peace and Freedom) 1.0%
California 12	Burt Talcott	Republican	1962	Incumbent re-elected.	▌ ✓ Burt Talcott (Republican) 94.9%; ▌Ann J. Holliday (American Independent) 5.1%
California 13	Charles M. Teague	Republican	1954	Incumbent re-elected.	▌ ✓ Charles M. Teague (Republican) 65.9%; ▌Stanley Sheinbaum (Democratic) 34.1%
California 14	Jerome Waldie	Democratic	1966	Incumbent re-elected.	▌ ✓ Jerome Waldie (Democratic) 71.6%; ▌David W. Schuh (Republican) 26.6%; ▌Luis W. Hamilton (American Independent) 1.9%
California 15	John J. McFall	Democratic	1956	Incumbent re-elected.	▌ ✓ John J. McFall (Democratic) 53.8%; ▌Sam Van Dyken (Republican) 46.2%
California 16	B. F. Sisk	Democratic	1954	Incumbent re-elected.	▌ ✓ B. F. Sisk (Democratic) 62.5%; ▌Dave Harris (Republican) 35.4%; ▌John P. Carroll (American Independent) 2.2%
California 17	Cecil R. King	Democratic	1942	Incumbent retired. Democratic hold.	▌ ✓ Glenn M. Anderson (Democratic) 50.7%; ▌Joe Blatchford (Republican) 48.1%; ▌Ben Dobbs (Peace and Freedom) 1.1%
California 18	Bob Mathias	Republican	1966	Incumbent re-elected.	▌ ✓ Bob Mathias (Republican) 65.2%; ▌Harlan Hagen (Democratic) 33.4%; ▌Edward C. Williams (American Independent) 1.4%
California 19	Chet Holifield	Democratic	1942	Incumbent re-elected.	▌ ✓ Chet Holifield (Democratic) 63.2%; ▌Bill Jones (Republican) 34.1%; ▌Wayne L. Cook (American Independent) 2.6%
California 20	H. Allen Smith	Republican	1956	Incumbent re-elected.	▌ ✓ H. Allen Smith (Republican) 69.3%; ▌Don White (Democratic) 29.2%; ▌Robert G. Clarke (Peace and Freedom) 1.5%
California 21	Augustus Hawkins	Democratic	1962	Incumbent re-elected.	▌ ✓ Augustus Hawkins (Democratic) 91.6%; ▌Rayfield Lundy (Republican) 8.4%
California 22	James C. Corman	Democratic	1960	Incumbent re-elected.	▌ ✓ James C. Corman (Democratic) 56.9%; ▌Joseph F. Holt (Republican) 41.4%; ▌Hugh Manes (Peace and Freedom) 1.7%
California 23	Del M. Clawson	Republican	1963	Incumbent re-elected.	▌ ✓ Del M. Clawson (Republican) 64.9%; ▌Jim Sperrazzo (Democratic) 35.1%
California 24	Glenard P. Lipscomb	Republican	1953	Incumbent re-elected.	▌ ✓ Glenard P. Lipscomb (Republican) 72.8%; ▌Fred Warner Neal (Democratic) 27.2%
California 25	Charles E. Wiggins	Republican	1966	Incumbent re-elected.	▌ ✓ Charles E. Wiggins (Republican) 68.6%; ▌Keith F. Shirey (Democratic) 31.4%
California 26	Thomas M. Rees	Democratic	1965	Incumbent re-elected.	▌ ✓ Thomas M. Rees (Democratic) 65.5%; ▌Irving Teichner (Republican) 31.3%; ▌Jack Weinberg (Peace and Freedom) 3.2%
California 27	Edwin Reinecke	Republican	1964	Incumbent re-elected.	▌ ✓ Edwin Reinecke (Republican) 72.2%; ▌John T. Butchko (Democratic) 27.8%
California 28	Alphonzo E. Bell Jr.	Republican	1960	Incumbent re-elected.	▌ ✓ Alphonzo E. Bell Jr. (Republican) 71.2%; ▌John McKee Pratt (Democratic) 26.9%; ▌Sherman Pearl (Peace and Freedom) 1.9%
California 29	George Brown Jr.	Democratic	1962	Incumbent re-elected.	▌ ✓ George Brown Jr. (Democratic) 52.3%; ▌Bill Orozco (Republican) 47.7%
California 30	Edward R. Roybal	Democratic	1962	Incumbent re-elected.	▌ ✓ Edward R. Roybal (Democratic) 67.5%; ▌Samuel M. Cavnar (Republican) 32.5%
California 31	Charles H. Wilson	Democratic	1962	Incumbent re-elected.	▌ ✓ Charles H. Wilson (Democratic) 58.9%; ▌James R. Dunn (Republican) 39.1%; ▌Stanley L. Schulte (American Independent) 2.0%
California 32	Craig Hosmer	Republican	1952	Incumbent re-elected.	▌ ✓ Craig Hosmer (Republican) 73.8%; ▌Arthur J. Gottlieb (Democratic) 24.1%; ▌Richard B. Williams (American Independent) 2.1%
California 33	Jerry Pettis	Republican	1966	Incumbent re-elected.	▌ ✓ Jerry Pettis (Republican) 66.3%; ▌Al C. Bellard (Democratic) 32.0%; ▌Earl D. Wallen (American Independent) 1.7%
California 34	Richard T. Hanna	Democratic	1962	Incumbent re-elected.	▌ ✓ Richard T. Hanna (Democratic) 50.9%; ▌Bill J. Teague (Republican) 49.1%
California 35	James B. Utt	Republican	1952	Incumbent re-elected.	▌ ✓ James B. Utt (Republican) 72.5%; ▌Thomas B. Lenhart (Democratic) 25.1%; ▌Annie McDonald (American Independent) 2.4%
California 36	Bob Wilson	Republican	1952	Incumbent re-elected.	▌ ✓ Bob Wilson (Republican) 71.6%; ▌Don Lindgren (Democratic) 28.4%
California 37	Lionel Van Deerlin	Democratic	1962	Incumbent re-elected.	▌ ✓ Lionel Van Deerlin (Democratic) 64.7%; ▌Mike Schaefer (Republican) 35.3%
California 38	John V. Tunney	Democratic	1964	Incumbent re-elected.	▌ ✓ John V. Tunney (Democratic) 62.8%; ▌Robert O. Hunter (Republican) 35.4%; ▌James C. Griffin (American Independent) 1.3%; ▌Terese A. Karmel (Peace and Freedom) 0.6%

== Colorado ==
District	Incumbent	Party	First elected	Result	Candidates
Colorado 1	Byron G. Rogers	Democratic	1950	Incumbent re-elected.	▌ ✓ Byron G. Rogers (Democratic) 45.7%; ▌Frank A. Kemp Jr. (Republican) 41.5%; ▌Gordon G. Barnewall (American Independent) 12.8%
Colorado 2	Donald G. Brotzman	Republican	1962; 1964 (lost); 1966	Incumbent re-elected.	▌ ✓ Donald G. Brotzman (Republican) 62.9%; ▌Roy H. McVicker (Democratic) 37.1%
Colorado 3	Frank Evans	Democratic	1964	Incumbent re-elected.	▌ ✓ Frank Evans (Democratic) 52.1%; ▌Paul Bradley (Republican) 47.9%
Colorado 4	Wayne N. Aspinall	Democratic	1948	Incumbent re-elected.	▌ ✓ Wayne N. Aspinall (Democratic) 54.7%; ▌Fred E. Anderson (Republican) 45.3%

== Connecticut ==
District	Incumbent	Party	First elected	Result	Candidates
Connecticut 1	Emilio Q. Daddario	Democratic	1958	Incumbent re-elected.	▌ ✓ Emilio Q. Daddario (Democratic) 62.4%; ▌Roger B. Ladd (Republican) 37.3%; ▌Donald B. LaCroix (Independent) 0.3%
Connecticut 2	William St. Onge	Democratic	1962	Incumbent re-elected.	▌ ✓ William St. Onge (Democratic) 54.1%; ▌Peter P. Mariani (Republican) 45.3%; ▌Daniel R. Tarasevich (American Independent) 0.6%
Connecticut 3	Robert Giaimo	Democratic	1958	Incumbent re-elected.	▌ ✓ Robert Giaimo (Democratic) 53.9%; ▌Stelio Salmona (Republican) 42.4%; ▌Robert M. Cook (American Independent) 3.7%
Connecticut 4	Donald J. Irwin	Democratic	1958; 1960 (lost); 1964	Incumbent lost re-election. Republican gain.	▌ ✓ Lowell Weicker (Republican) 51.4%; ▌Donald J. Irwin (Democratic) 47.3%; ▌Morris Earle (Independent) 1.3%
Connecticut 5	John S. Monagan	Democratic	1958	Incumbent re-elected.	▌ ✓ John S. Monagan (Democratic) 56.3%; ▌Gaetano A. Russo Jr. (Republican) 43.7%
Connecticut 6	Thomas Meskill	Republican	1966	Incumbent re-elected.	▌ ✓ Thomas Meskill (Republican) 62.3%; ▌Robert M. Sharaf (Democratic) 37.7%

== Delaware ==
District	Incumbent	Party	First elected	Result	Candidates
Delaware at-large	William Roth	Republican	1966	Incumbent re-elected.	▌ ✓ William Roth (Republican) 58.7%; ▌Harris McDowell (Democratic) 41.3%

== Florida ==
District	Incumbent	Party	First elected	Result	Candidates
Florida 1	Bob Sikes	Democratic	1940; 1944 (resigned); 1974	Incumbent re-elected.	▌ ✓ Bob Sikes (Democratic) 84.7%; ▌John Drzazga (Republican) 15.3%
Florida 2	Don Fuqua	Democratic	1962	Incumbent re-elected.	▌ ✓ Don Fuqua (Democratic); Unopposed
Florida 3	Charles E. Bennett	Democratic	1948	Incumbent re-elected.	▌ ✓ Charles E. Bennett (Democratic) 78.9%; ▌Bill Parsons (Republican) 21.1%
Florida 4	Syd Herlong	Democratic	1948	Incumbent retired. Democratic hold.	▌ ✓ Bill Chappell (Democratic) 52.8%; ▌Bill Herlong (Republican) 47.2%
Florida 5	Edward Gurney	Republican	1962	Incumbent retired to run for U.S. senator. Republican hold.	▌ ✓ Louis Frey Jr. (Republican) 61.7%; ▌James C. Robinson (Democratic) 38.3%
Florida 6	Sam Gibbons	Democratic	1962	Incumbent re-elected.	▌ ✓ Sam Gibbons (Democratic) 62.0%; ▌Paul A. Saad (Republican) 38.0%
Florida 7	James A. Haley	Democratic	1952	Incumbent re-elected.	▌ ✓ James A. Haley (Democratic) 55.0%; ▌Joe Z. Lovingood (Republican) 45.0%
Florida 8	William C. Cramer	Republican	1954	Incumbent re-elected.	▌ ✓ William C. Cramer (Republican); Unopposed
Florida 9	Paul Rogers	Democratic	1954	Incumbent re-elected.	▌ ✓ Paul Rogers (Democratic) 56.2%; ▌Robert W. Rust (Republican) 43.8%
Florida 10	J. Herbert Burke	Republican	1966	Incumbent re-elected.	▌ ✓ J. Herbert Burke (Republican) 54.9%; ▌Elton Gissendanner (Democratic) 45.1%
Florida 11	Claude Pepper	Democratic	1962	Incumbent re-elected.	▌ ✓ Claude Pepper (Democratic) 76.6%; ▌Ronald I. Strauss (Republican) 23.4%
Florida 12	Dante Fascell	Democratic	1954	Incumbent re-elected.	▌ ✓ Dante Fascell (Democratic) 57.0%; ▌Mike Thompson (Republican) 43.0%

== Georgia ==
District	Incumbent	Party	First elected	Result	Candidates
Georgia 1	G. Elliott Hagan	Democratic	1960	Incumbent re-elected.	▌ ✓ G. Elliott Hagan (Democratic) 68.2%; ▌Joseph Tribble (Republican) 31.8%
Georgia 2	Maston E. O'Neal Jr.	Democratic	1964	Incumbent re-elected.	▌ ✓ Maston E. O'Neal Jr. (Democratic); Unopposed
Georgia 3	Jack Brinkley	Democratic	1966	Incumbent re-elected.	▌ ✓ Jack Brinkley (Democratic); Unopposed
Georgia 4	Benjamin B. Blackburn	Republican	1966	Incumbent re-elected.	▌ ✓ Benjamin B. Blackburn (Republican) 57.5%; ▌James MacKay (Democratic) 42.5%
Georgia 5	Fletcher Thompson	Republican	1966	Incumbent re-elected.	▌ ✓ Fletcher Thompson (Republican) 55.6%; ▌Charles L. Weltner (Democratic) 44.4%
Georgia 6	John Flynt	Democratic	1954	Incumbent re-elected.	▌ ✓ John Flynt (Democratic); Unopposed
Georgia 7	John William Davis	Democratic	1960	Incumbent re-elected.	▌ ✓ John William Davis (Democratic); Unopposed
Georgia 8	W. S. Stuckey Jr.	Democratic	1966	Incumbent re-elected.	▌ ✓ W. S. Stuckey Jr. (Democratic); Unopposed
Georgia 9	Phillip M. Landrum	Democratic	1952	Incumbent re-elected.	▌ ✓ Phillip M. Landrum (Democratic); Unopposed
Georgia 10	Robert Grier Stephens Jr.	Democratic	1960	Incumbent re-elected.	▌ ✓ Robert Grier Stephens Jr. (Democratic); Unopposed

== Hawaii ==
District	Incumbent			This race	
District	Member	Party	First elected	Results	Candidates
Hawaii at-large (2 seats)	Spark Matsunaga	Democratic	1962	Incumbent re-elected.	Elected on a general ticket: ▌ ✓ Spark Matsunaga (Democratic) 37.4%; ▌ ✓ Patsy Mink (Democratic) 34.4%; ▌Neal Blaisdell (Republican) 18.2%; ▌George Dubois (Republican) 9.0%; ▌John D. Olsen (Peace and Freedom) 0.6%; ▌Peter Lombardi (Peace and Freedom) 0.5%
Hawaii at-large (2 seats)	Patsy Mink	Democratic	1964	Incumbent re-elected.	Elected on a general ticket: ▌ ✓ Spark Matsunaga (Democratic) 37.4%; ▌ ✓ Patsy Mink (Democratic) 34.4%; ▌Neal Blaisdell (Republican) 18.2%; ▌George Dubois (Republican) 9.0%; ▌John D. Olsen (Peace and Freedom) 0.6%; ▌Peter Lombardi (Peace and Freedom) 0.5%

== Idaho ==
District	Incumbent	Party	First elected	Result	Candidates
Idaho 1	Jim McClure	Republican	1966	Incumbent re-elected.	▌ ✓ Jim McClure (Republican) 59.4%; ▌Compton I. White Jr. (Democratic) 40.6%
Idaho 2	George V. Hansen	Republican	1964	Incumbent retired to run for U.S. senator. Republican hold.	▌ ✓ Orval H. Hansen (Republican) 52.6%; ▌Darrell V. Manning (Democratic) 43.9%; ▌Joel Anderson (American Independent) 3.5%

== Illinois ==
District	Incumbent	Party	First elected	Result	Candidates
Illinois 1	William L. Dawson	Democratic	1942	Incumbent re-elected.	▌ ✓ William L. Dawson (Democratic) 84.6%; ▌Janet Roberts Jennings (Republican) 15.4%
Illinois 2	Barratt O'Hara	Democratic	1948; 1950 (lost); 1952	Incumbent lost renomination. Democratic hold.	▌ ✓ Abner Mikva (Democratic) 65.4%; ▌Thomas R. Ireland (Republican) 34.6%
Illinois 3	William T. Murphy	Democratic	1958	Incumbent re-elected.	▌ ✓ William T. Murphy (Democratic) 54.0%; ▌Robert A. Podesta (Republican) 46.0%
Illinois 4	Ed Derwinski	Republican	1958	Incumbent re-elected.	▌ ✓ Ed Derwinski (Republican) 68.3%; ▌Robert E. Creighton (Democratic) 31.7%
Illinois 5	John C. Kluczynski	Democratic	1950	Incumbent re-elected.	▌ ✓ John C. Kluczynski (Democratic) 55.4%; ▌Joseph J. Krasowski (Republican) 44.6%
Illinois 6	Daniel J. Ronan	Democratic	1964	Incumbent re-elected.	▌ ✓ Daniel J. Ronan (Democratic) 59.7%; ▌Gerald Dolezal (Republican) 40.3%
Illinois 7	Frank Annunzio	Democratic	1964	Incumbent re-elected.	▌ ✓ Frank Annunzio (Democratic) 83.1%; ▌Thomas J. Lento (Republican) 16.9%
Illinois 8	Dan Rostenkowski	Democratic	1958	Incumbent re-elected.	▌ ✓ Dan Rostenkowski (Democratic) 62.8%; ▌Henry S. Kaplinski (Republican) 37.2%
Illinois 9	Sidney R. Yates	Democratic	1948; 1962 (retired); 1964	Incumbent re-elected.	▌ ✓ Sidney R. Yates (Democratic) 64.4%; ▌Edward U. Notz (Republican) 35.6%
Illinois 10	Harold R. Collier	Republican	1956	Incumbent re-elected.	▌ ✓ Harold R. Collier (Republican) 66.8%; ▌Seymour C. Axelrood (Democratic) 33.2%
Illinois 11	Roman Pucinski	Democratic	1958	Incumbent re-elected.	▌ ✓ Roman Pucinski (Democratic) 55.8%; ▌John J. Hoellen Jr. (Republican) 44.2%
Illinois 12	Robert McClory	Republican	1962	Incumbent re-elected.	▌ ✓ Robert McClory (Republican) 70.4%; ▌Albert S. Salvi (Democratic) 29.6%
Illinois 13	Donald Rumsfeld	Republican	1962	Incumbent re-elected.	▌ ✓ Donald Rumsfeld (Republican) 72.7%; ▌David C. Baylor (Democratic) 27.3%
Illinois 14	John N. Erlenborn	Republican	1964	Incumbent re-elected.	▌ ✓ John N. Erlenborn (Republican) 71.1%; ▌Marc Karson (Democratic) 28.9%
Illinois 15	Charlotte Thompson Reid	Republican	1962	Incumbent re-elected.	▌ ✓ Charlotte Thompson Reid (Republican) 68.7%; ▌Benjamin P. Alschuler (Democratic) 31.3%
Illinois 16	John B. Anderson	Republican	1960	Incumbent re-elected.	▌ ✓ John B. Anderson (Republican) 67.3%; ▌Stan Major (Democratic) 32.7%
Illinois 17	Leslie C. Arends	Republican	1934	Incumbent re-elected.	▌ ✓ Leslie C. Arends (Republican) 65.3%; ▌Lester A. Hawthorne (Democratic) 34.7%
Illinois 18	Robert H. Michel	Republican	1956	Incumbent re-elected.	▌ ✓ Robert H. Michel (Republican) 60.9%; ▌James G. Hatcher (Democratic) 39.1%
Illinois 19	Tom Railsback	Republican	1966	Incumbent re-elected.	▌ ✓ Tom Railsback (Republican) 63.5%; ▌Craig Lovitt (Democratic) 36.5%
Illinois 20	Paul Findley	Republican	1960	Incumbent re-elected.	▌ ✓ Paul Findley (Republican) 66.2%; ▌Donald L. Schilson (Democratic) 33.8%
Illinois 21	Kenneth J. Gray	Democratic	1954	Incumbent re-elected.	▌ ✓ Kenneth J. Gray (Democratic) 54.1%; ▌Val Oshel (Republican) 45.9%
Illinois 22	William L. Springer	Republican	1950	Incumbent re-elected.	▌ ✓ William L. Springer (Republican) 64.3%; ▌Carl Firley (Democratic) 35.7%
Illinois 23	George E. Shipley	Democratic	1958	Incumbent re-elected.	▌ ✓ George E. Shipley (Democratic) 54.0%; ▌Bert Hopper (Republican) 46.0%
Illinois 24	Melvin Price	Democratic	1944	Incumbent re-elected.	▌ ✓ Melvin Price (Democratic) 71.3%; ▌John S. Guthrie (Republican) 28.7%

== Indiana ==
District	Incumbent	Party	First elected	Result	Candidates
Indiana 1	Ray Madden	Democratic	1942	Incumbent re-elected.	▌ ✓ Ray Madden (Democratic) 56.7%; ▌Donald E. Taylor (Republican) 43.0%; ▌J. Ralston Miller (Prohibition) 0.2%
Indiana 2	Charles A. Halleck	Republican	1935	Incumbent retired. Republican hold.	▌ ✓ Earl Landgrebe (Republican) 55.1%; ▌Edward F. Kelly (Democratic) 44.9%
Indiana 3	John Brademas	Democratic	1958	Incumbent re-elected.	▌ ✓ John Brademas (Democratic) 52.2%; ▌William W. Erwin (Republican) 47.8%
Indiana 4	E. Ross Adair	Republican	1950	Incumbent re-elected.	▌ ✓ E. Ross Adair (Republican) 51.4%; ▌J. Edward Roush (Democratic) 48.6%
Indiana 4	J. Edward Roush; Redistricted from the 5th district	Democratic	1958	Redistricting contest. Democratic loss.	▌ ✓ E. Ross Adair (Republican) 51.4%; ▌J. Edward Roush (Democratic) 48.6%
Indiana 5	Richard L. Roudebush; Redistricted from the 10th district	Republican	1960	Incumbent re-elected.	▌ ✓ Richard L. Roudebush (Republican) 63.0%; ▌Robert C. Ford (Democratic) 37.0%
Indiana 6	William G. Bray	Republican	1950	Incumbent re-elected.	▌ ✓ William G. Bray (Republican) 64.9%; ▌Phillip L. Bayt (Democratic) 35.1%
Indiana 7	John T. Myers	Republican	1966	Incumbent re-elected.	▌ ✓ John T. Myers (Republican) 59.8%; ▌Elden C. Tipton (Democratic) 40.2%
Indiana 8	Roger H. Zion	Republican	1966	Incumbent re-elected.	▌ ✓ Roger H. Zion (Republican) 54.5%; ▌K. Wayne Kent (Democratic) 45.5%
Indiana 9	Lee Hamilton	Democratic	1964	Incumbent re-elected.	▌ ✓ Lee Hamilton (Democratic) 54.4%; ▌Robert D. Garton (Republican) 45.6%
Indiana 10	None (district created)			New seat. Republican gain.	▌ ✓ David W. Dennis (Republican) 53.9%; ▌William J. Norton (Democratic) 46.1%
Indiana 11	Andrew Jacobs Jr.	Democratic	1964	Incumbent re-elected.	▌ ✓ Andrew Jacobs Jr. (Democratic) 53.1%; ▌W. W. Hill Jr. (Republican) 46.9%

== Iowa ==
District	Incumbent	Party	First elected	Result	Candidates
Iowa 1	Fred Schwengel	Republican	1954; 1964 (lost); 1966	Incumbent re-elected.	▌ ✓ Fred Schwengel (Republican) 53.0%; ▌John R. Schmidhauser (Democratic) 47.0%
Iowa 2	John Culver	Democratic	1964	Incumbent re-elected.	▌ ✓ John Culver (Democratic) 55.1%; ▌Tom Riley (Republican) 44.9%
Iowa 3	H. R. Gross	Republican	1948	Incumbent re-elected.	▌ ✓ H. R. Gross (Republican) 64.0%; ▌John E. Van Eschen (Democratic) 36.0%
Iowa 4	John Henry Kyl	Republican	1959 (special); 1964 (lost); 1966	Incumbent re-elected.	▌ ✓ John Henry Kyl (Republican) 53.9%; ▌Bert Bandstra (Democratic) 46.1%
Iowa 5	Neal Smith	Democratic	1958	Incumbent re-elected.	▌ ✓ Neal Smith (Democratic) 62.1%; ▌Don Mahon (Republican) 37.9%
Iowa 6	Wiley Mayne	Republican	1966	Incumbent re-elected.	▌ ✓ Wiley Mayne (Republican) 65.0%; ▌Jerry O'Sullivan (Democratic) 35.0%
Iowa 7	William J. Scherle	Republican	1966	Incumbent re-elected.	▌ ✓ William J. Scherle (Republican) 65.1%; ▌Richard C. Oshlo (Democratic) 34.9%

== Kansas ==
District	Incumbent	Party	First elected	Result	Candidates
Kansas 1	Bob Dole	Republican	1960	Incumbent retired to run for U.S. senator. Republican hold.	▌ ✓ Keith Sebelius (Republican) 51.5%; ▌George W. Meeker (Democratic) 48.5%
Kansas 2	Chester L. Mize	Republican	1964	Incumbent re-elected.	▌ ✓ Chester L. Mize (Republican) 67.6%; ▌Robert Austin Swan Jr. (Democratic) 32.4%
Kansas 3	Larry Winn	Republican	1966	Incumbent re-elected.	▌ ✓ Larry Winn (Republican) 62.8%; ▌Newell A. George (Democratic) 37.2%
Kansas 4	Garner E. Shriver	Republican	1960	Incumbent re-elected.	▌ ✓ Garner E. Shriver (Republican) 64.7%; ▌Patrick F. Kelly (Democratic) 35.3%
Kansas 5	Joe Skubitz	Republican	1962	Incumbent re-elected.	▌ ✓ Joe Skubitz (Republican) 64.5%; ▌A. F. Bramble (Democratic) 35.5%

== Kentucky ==
District	Incumbent	Party	First elected	Result	Candidates
Kentucky 1	Frank Stubblefield	Democratic	1958	Incumbent re-elected.	▌ ✓ Frank Stubblefield (Democratic); Unopposed
Kentucky 2	William Natcher	Democratic	1953 (special)	Incumbent re-elected.	▌ ✓ William Natcher (Democratic) 56.4%; ▌Robert D. Simmons (Republican) 43.6%
Kentucky 3	William Cowger	Republican	1966	Incumbent re-elected.	▌ ✓ William Cowger (Republican) 55.9%; ▌Tom O. Ray (Democratic) 44.1%
Kentucky 4	Gene Snyder	Republican	1962; 1964 (lost); 1966	Incumbent re-elected.	▌ ✓ Gene Snyder (Republican) 65.0%; ▌Gus Sheehan Jr. (Democratic) 35.0%
Kentucky 5	Tim Lee Carter	Republican	1964	Incumbent re-elected.	▌ ✓ Tim Lee Carter (Republican) 72.8%; ▌Thomas Jefferson Roberts (Democratic) 25.8%; ▌Charles P. Peace (American Independent) 1.5%
Kentucky 6	John C. Watts	Democratic	1951	Incumbent re-elected.	▌ ✓ John C. Watts (Democratic) 56.5%; ▌Russell G. Mobley (Republican) 42.4%; ▌J. Donald Graham (American Independent) 1.1%
Kentucky 7	Carl D. Perkins	Democratic	1948	Incumbent re-elected.	▌ ✓ Carl D. Perkins (Democratic) 62.0%; ▌James D. Nickell (Republican) 38.0%

== Louisiana ==
District	Incumbent	Party	First elected	Result	Candidates
Louisiana 1	F. Edward Hébert	Democratic	1940	Incumbent re-elected.	▌ ✓ F. Edward Hébert (Democratic); Unopposed
Louisiana 2	Hale Boggs	Democratic	1940; 1942 (lost); 1946	Incumbent re-elected.	▌ ✓ Hale Boggs (Democratic) 51.2%; ▌Dave Treen (Republican) 48.8%
Louisiana 3	Edwin E. Willis	Democratic	1948	Incumbent lost renomination. Democratic hold.	▌ ✓ Patrick T. Caffery (Democratic); Unopposed
Louisiana 4	Joe Waggonner	Democratic	1961	Incumbent re-elected.	▌ ✓ Joe Waggonner (Democratic); Unopposed
Louisiana 5	Otto Passman	Democratic	1946	Incumbent re-elected.	▌ ✓ Otto Passman (Democratic); Unopposed
Louisiana 6	John Rarick	Democratic	1966	Incumbent re-elected.	▌ ✓ John Rarick (Democratic) 79.3%; ▌Loyd J. Rockhold (Republican) 20.7%
Louisiana 7	Edwin Edwards	Democratic	1965	Incumbent re-elected.	▌ ✓ Edwin Edwards (Democratic) 84.9%; ▌Vance W. Plauche (Republican) 15.1%
Louisiana 8	Speedy Long	Democratic	1964	Incumbent re-elected.	▌ ✓ Speedy Long (Democratic); Unopposed

== Maine ==
District	Incumbent	Party	First elected	Result	Candidates
Maine 1	Peter Kyros	Democratic	1966	Incumbent re-elected.	▌ ✓ Peter Kyros (Democratic) 56.6%; ▌Horace A. Hildreth Jr. (Republican) 43.4%
Maine 2	William Hathaway	Democratic	1964	Incumbent re-elected.	▌ ✓ William Hathaway (Democratic) 55.7%; ▌Elden H. Shute Jr. (Republican) 44.3%

== Maryland ==
District	Incumbent	Party	First elected	Result	Candidates
Maryland 1	Rogers Morton	Republican	1962	Incumbent re-elected.	▌ ✓ Rogers Morton (Republican) 73.6%; ▌E. Homer White (Democratic) 26.4%
Maryland 2	Clarence Long	Democratic	1962	Incumbent re-elected.	▌ ✓ Clarence Long (Democratic) 59.1%; ▌John E. Mudd (Republican) 40.9%
Maryland 3	Edward Garmatz	Democratic	1947	Incumbent re-elected.	▌ ✓ Edward Garmatz (Democratic) 81.2%; ▌James E. Chew (Republican) 18.8%
Maryland 4	George Hyde Fallon	Democratic	1944	Incumbent re-elected.	▌ ✓ George Hyde Fallon (Democratic) 65.6%; ▌Thomas Paul Raimondi (Republican) 34.4%
Maryland 5	Hervey Machen	Democratic	1964	Incumbent lost re-election. Republican gain.	▌ ✓ Lawrence Hogan (Republican) 52.7%; ▌Hervey Machen (Democratic) 47.3%
Maryland 6	Charles Mathias	Republican	1960	Incumbent retired to run for U.S. senator. Republican hold.	▌ ✓ J. Glenn Beall Jr. (Republican) 53.0%; ▌Goodloe Byron (Democratic) 47.0%
Maryland 7	Samuel Friedel	Democratic	1952	Incumbent re-elected.	▌ ✓ Samuel Friedel (Democratic) 79.6%; ▌Arthur W. Downs (Republican) 20.4%
Maryland 8	Gilbert Gude	Republican	1966	Incumbent re-elected.	▌ ✓ Gilbert Gude (Republican) 60.9%; ▌Margaret C. Schweinhaut (Democratic) 39.1%

== Massachusetts ==
District	Incumbent	Party	First elected	Result	Candidates
Massachusetts 1	Silvio O. Conte	Republican	1958	Incumbent re-elected.	▌ ✓ Silvio O. Conte (Republican); Unopposed
Massachusetts 2	Edward Boland	Democratic	1952	Incumbent re-elected.	▌ ✓ Edward Boland (Democratic) 73.6%; ▌Frederick M. Whitney Jr. (Republican) 26.4%
Massachusetts 3	Philip J. Philbin	Democratic	1942	Incumbent re-elected.	▌ ✓ Philip J. Philbin (Democratic) 47.8%; ▌Chandler H. Stevens (Independent) 27.7%; ▌Laurence Curtis (Republican) 24.5%
Massachusetts 4	Harold Donohue	Democratic	1946	Incumbent re-elected.	▌ ✓ Harold Donohue (Democratic) 61.0%; ▌Howard A. Miller Jr. (Republican) 39.0%
Massachusetts 5	F. Bradford Morse	Republican	1960	Incumbent re-elected.	▌ ✓ F. Bradford Morse (Republican) 60.4%; ▌Robert C. Maguire (Democratic) 39.6%
Massachusetts 6	William H. Bates	Republican	1950	Incumbent re-elected.	▌ ✓ William H. Bates (Republican) 66.1%; ▌Deirdre Henderson (Democratic) 33.9%
Massachusetts 7	Torbert Macdonald	Democratic	1954	Incumbent re-elected.	▌ ✓ Torbert Macdonald (Democratic) 62.5%; ▌William S. Abbott (Republican) 37.5%
Massachusetts 8	Tip O'Neill	Democratic	1952	Incumbent re-elected.	▌ ✓ Tip O'Neill (Democratic); Unopposed
Massachusetts 9	John W. McCormack	Democratic	1928	Incumbent re-elected.	▌ ✓ John W. McCormack (Democratic) 82.9%; ▌Alan C. Freeman (Republican) 17.1%
Massachusetts 10	Margaret Heckler	Republican	1966	Incumbent re-elected.	▌ ✓ Margaret Heckler (Republican) 67.4%; ▌Edmund Dinis (Democratic) 32.6%
Massachusetts 11	James A. Burke	Democratic	1958	Incumbent re-elected.	▌ ✓ James A. Burke (Democratic); Unopposed
Massachusetts 12	Hastings Keith	Republican	1958	Incumbent re-elected.	▌ ✓ Hastings Keith (Republican); Unopposed

== Michigan ==
District	Incumbent	Party	First elected	Result	Candidates
Michigan 1	John Conyers	Democratic	1964	Incumbent re-elected.	▌ ✓ John Conyers (Democratic); Unopposed
Michigan 2	Marvin L. Esch	Republican	1966	Incumbent re-elected.	▌ ✓ Marvin L. Esch (Republican) 54.3%; ▌Weston E. Vivian (Democratic) 44.9%; ▌Bertram E. Garskoff (Independent) 0.5%; ▌John Belisle (Socialist Workers) 0.2%; ▌Ralph W. Muncy (Socialist Labor) 0.1%
Michigan 3	Garry E. Brown	Republican	1966	Incumbent re-elected.	▌ ✓ Garry E. Brown (Republican) 65.2%; ▌Thomas L. Keenan (Democratic) 34.8%
Michigan 4	J. Edward Hutchinson	Republican	1962	Incumbent re-elected.	▌ ✓ J. Edward Hutchinson (Republican) 65.6%; ▌John V. Martin (Democratic) 34.4%
Michigan 5	Gerald Ford	Republican	1948	Incumbent re-elected.	▌ ✓ Gerald Ford (Republican) 62.8%; ▌Lawrence E. Howard (Democratic) 37.2%; ▌Frank Girard (Socialist Labor) 0.09%
Michigan 6	Charles E. Chamberlain	Republican	1956	Incumbent re-elected.	▌ ✓ Charles E. Chamberlain (Republican) 64.1%; ▌James A. Harrison (Democratic) 35.9%
Michigan 7	Donald Riegle	Republican	1966	Incumbent re-elected.	▌ ✓ Donald Riegle (Republican) 60.7%; ▌William R. Blue (Democratic) 39.3%
Michigan 8	R. James Harvey	Republican	1960	Incumbent re-elected.	▌ ✓ R. James Harvey (Republican) 68.8%; ▌Richard E. Davies (Democratic) 31.2%
Michigan 9	Guy Vander Jagt	Republican	1966	Incumbent re-elected.	▌ ✓ Guy Vander Jagt (Republican) 67.5%; ▌Jay A. Wabeke (Democratic) 32.5%
Michigan 10	Al Cederberg	Republican	1952	Incumbent re-elected.	▌ ✓ Al Cederberg (Republican) 65.9%; ▌Wayne Miller (Democratic) 34.1%
Michigan 11	Philip Ruppe	Republican	1966	Incumbent re-elected.	▌ ✓ Philip Ruppe (Republican) 58.8%; ▌Raymond F. Clevenger (Democratic) 41.2%
Michigan 12	James G. O'Hara	Democratic	1958	Incumbent re-elected.	▌ ✓ James G. O'Hara (Democratic) 70.3%; ▌Max B. Harris Jr. (Republican) 29.3%; ▌Frank Lovell (Socialist Workers) 0.2%; ▌James C. Horvath (Socialist Labor) 0.2%
Michigan 13	Charles Diggs	Democratic	1954	Incumbent re-elected.	▌ ✓ Charles Diggs (Democratic) 86.4%; ▌Eugene Beauregard (Republican) 13.6%
Michigan 14	Lucien Nedzi	Democratic	1961	Incumbent re-elected.	▌ ✓ Lucien Nedzi (Democratic) 63.0%; ▌Peter O'Rourke (Republican) 37.0%
Michigan 15	William D. Ford	Democratic	1964	Incumbent re-elected.	▌ ✓ William D. Ford (Democratic) 71.0%; ▌John F. Boyle (Republican) 29.0%
Michigan 16	John Dingell	Democratic	1955	Incumbent re-elected.	▌ ✓ John Dingell (Democratic) 73.9%; ▌Monte R. Bona (Republican) 25.9%; ▌Henry Austin (Socialist Workers) 0.3%
Michigan 17	Martha Griffiths	Democratic	1954	Incumbent re-elected.	▌ ✓ Martha Griffiths (Democratic) 74.8%; ▌John M. Siviter (Republican) 24.8%; ▌Linda Belisle (Socialist Workers) 0.2%; ▌James Sim (Socialist Labor) 0.2%
Michigan 18	William Broomfield	Republican	1956	Incumbent re-elected.	▌ ✓ William Broomfield (Republican) 59.9%; ▌Allen Zemmol (Democratic) 39.7%; ▌Sarah Lovell (Socialist Workers) 0.3%; ▌W. Clifford Bentley (Socialist Labor) 0.1%
Michigan 19	Jack H. McDonald	Republican	1966	Incumbent re-elected.	▌ ✓ Jack H. McDonald (Republican) 58.0%; ▌Gary R. Frink (Democratic) 42.0%

== Minnesota ==
District	Incumbent	Party	First elected	Result	Candidates
Minnesota 1	Al Quie	Republican	1958	Incumbent re-elected.	▌ ✓ Al Quie (Republican) 68.7%; ▌George Daley (DFL) 31.3%
Minnesota 2	Ancher Nelsen	Republican	1958	Incumbent re-elected.	▌ ✓ Ancher Nelsen (Republican) 59.5%; ▌Jon Wefald (DFL) 40.5%
Minnesota 3	Clark MacGregor	Republican	1960	Incumbent re-elected.	▌ ✓ Clark MacGregor (Republican) 64.8%; ▌Eugene E. Stokowski (DFL) 35.2%
Minnesota 4	Joseph Karth	DFL	1958	Incumbent re-elected.	▌ ✓ Joseph Karth (DFL) 61.3%; ▌Emery G. Barrette (Republican) 38.7%
Minnesota 5	Donald M. Fraser	DFL	1962	Incumbent re-elected.	▌ ✓ Donald M. Fraser (DFL) 57.5%; ▌Harmon T. Ogdahl (Republican) 41.8%; ▌William C. Braatz (Industrial Government) 0.4%; ▌David Thorstad (Socialist Workers) 0.3%
Minnesota 6	John M. Zwach	Republican	1966	Incumbent re-elected.	▌ ✓ John M. Zwach (Republican) 56.2%; ▌J. Buford Johnson (DFL) 43.8%
Minnesota 7	Odin Langen	Republican	1958	Incumbent re-elected.	▌ ✓ Odin Langen (Republican) 51.2%; ▌Robert Bergland (DFL) 48.8%
Minnesota 8	John Blatnik	DFL	1946	Incumbent re-elected.	▌ ✓ John Blatnik (DFL) 67.6%; ▌James A. Hennen (Republican) 32.4%

== Mississippi ==
District	Incumbent	Party	First elected	Result	Candidates
Mississippi 1	Thomas Abernethy	Democratic	1942	Incumbent re-elected.	▌ ✓ Thomas Abernethy (Democratic); Unopposed
Mississippi 2	Jamie Whitten	Democratic	1941 (special)	Incumbent re-elected.	▌ ✓ Jamie Whitten (Democratic); Unopposed
Mississippi 3	Charles H. Griffin	Democratic	1968 (special)	Incumbent re-elected.	▌ ✓ Charles H. Griffin (Democratic); Unopposed
Mississippi 4	Sonny Montgomery	Democratic	1966	Incumbent re-elected.	▌ ✓ Sonny Montgomery (Democratic) 70.0%; ▌Prentiss Walker (Republican) 30.0%
Mississippi 5	William M. Colmer	Democratic	1932	Incumbent re-elected.	▌ ✓ William M. Colmer (Democratic); Unopposed

== Missouri ==
District	Incumbent	Party	First elected	Result	Candidates
Missouri 1	Frank M. Karsten	Democratic	1946	Incumbent retired. Democratic hold.	▌ ✓ Bill Clay (Democratic) 64.1%; ▌Curtis C. Crawford (Republican) 35.9%
Missouri 2	Thomas B. Curtis	Republican	1950	Incumbent retired to run for U.S. senator. Democratic gain.	▌ ✓ James W. Symington (Democratic) 53.2%; ▌Hugh Scott (Republican) 46.8%
Missouri 3	Leonor Sullivan	Democratic	1952	Incumbent re-elected.	▌ ✓ Leonor Sullivan (Democratic) 73.4%; ▌Homer McCracken (Republican) 26.6%
Missouri 4	William J. Randall	Democratic	1959	Incumbent re-elected.	▌ ✓ William J. Randall (Democratic) 57.9%; ▌Leslie O. Olson (Republican) 42.1%
Missouri 5	Richard W. Bolling	Democratic	1948	Incumbent re-elected.	▌ ✓ Richard W. Bolling (Democratic) 65.4%; ▌Harold Masters (Republican) 34.6%
Missouri 6	William R. Hull Jr.	Democratic	1954	Incumbent re-elected.	▌ ✓ William R. Hull Jr. (Democratic) 54.6%; ▌James E. Austin (Republican) 45.4%
Missouri 7	Durward G. Hall	Republican	1960	Incumbent re-elected.	▌ ✓ Durward G. Hall (Republican) 63.8%; ▌Ed Bonitt (Democratic) 36.2%
Missouri 8	Richard H. Ichord Jr.	Democratic	1960	Incumbent re-elected.	▌ ✓ Richard H. Ichord Jr. (Democratic) 57.5%; ▌Eugene E. Northern (Republican) 42.0%; ▌Charles H. Byford (American Independent) 0.5%
Missouri 9	William L. Hungate	Democratic	1964	Incumbent re-elected.	▌ ✓ William L. Hungate (Democratic) 52.2%; ▌Kit Bond (Republican) 47.8%
Missouri 10	Paul C. Jones	Democratic	1948	Incumbent retired. Democratic hold.	▌ ✓ Bill Burlison (Democratic) 54.0%; ▌Vernon H. Landgraf (Republican) 46.0%

== Montana ==
District	Incumbent	Party	First elected	Result	Candidates
Montana 1	Arnold Olsen	Democratic	1960	Incumbent re-elected.	▌ ✓ Arnold Olsen (Democratic) 53.6%; ▌Dick Smiley (Republican) 46.4%
Montana 2	James F. Battin	Republican	1960	Incumbent re-elected.	▌ ✓ James F. Battin (Republican) 67.8%; ▌Robert Kelleher (Democratic) 32.2%

== Nebraska ==
District	Incumbent	Party	First elected	Result	Candidates
Nebraska 1	Robert V. Denney	Republican	1966	Incumbent re-elected.	▌ ✓ Robert V. Denney (Republican) 54.1%; ▌Clair A. Callan (Democratic) 43.4%; ▌Harry Bruce Hamilton (New Party) 2.5%
Nebraska 2	Glenn Cunningham	Republican	1956	Incumbent re-elected.	▌ ✓ Glenn Cunningham (Republican) 55.2%; ▌Mrs. Frank B. Morrison (Democratic) 44.8%
Nebraska 3	David Martin	Republican	1960	Incumbent re-elected.	▌ ✓ David Martin (Republican) 67.8%; ▌J. B. Dean (Democratic) 32.2%

== Nevada ==
District	Incumbent	Party	First elected	Result	Candidates
Nevada at-large	Walter S. Baring Jr.	Democratic	1948; 1952 (lost); 1956	Incumbent re-elected.	▌ ✓ Walter S. Baring Jr. (Democratic) 72.1%; ▌James Michael Slattery (Republican) 27.9%

== New Hampshire ==
District	Incumbent	Party	First elected	Result	Candidates
New Hampshire 1	Louis C. Wyman	Republican	1962; 1964 (lost); 1966	Incumbent re-elected.	▌ ✓ Louis C. Wyman (Republican) 63.4%; ▌James T. Keefe (Democratic) 36.6%
New Hampshire 2	James Colgate Cleveland	Republican	1962	Incumbent re-elected.	▌ ✓ James Colgate Cleveland (Republican) 71.1%; ▌David C. Hoeh (Democratic) 28.9%

== New Jersey ==
District	Incumbent	Party	First elected	Result	Candidates
New Jersey 1	John E. Hunt	Republican	1966	Incumbent re-elected.	▌ ✓ John E. Hunt (Republican) 58.0%; ▌Thomas S. Higgins (Democratic) 40.9%; ▌Elliott G. Heard Jr. (Abolish Port Authority) 0.6%; ▌Dominic W. Doganiero (Socialist Labor) 0.4%
New Jersey 2	Charles W. Sandman Jr.	Republican	1966	Incumbent re-elected.	▌ ✓ Charles W. Sandman Jr. (Republican) 55.3%; ▌David Dichter (Democratic) 44.4%; ▌Albert Ronis (Socialist Labor) 0.3%
New Jersey 3	James J. Howard	Democratic	1964	Incumbent re-elected.	▌ ✓ James J. Howard (Democratic) 57.8%; ▌Richard R. Stout (Republican) 41.9%; ▌Walter Petrovich (Socialist Labor) 0.3%
New Jersey 4	Frank Thompson	Democratic	1954	Incumbent re-elected.	▌ ✓ Frank Thompson (Democratic) 53.4%; ▌Sidney S. Souter (Republican) 46.4%; ▌Joseph J. Frank (Socialist Labor) 0.2%
New Jersey 5	Peter Frelinghuysen Jr.	Republican	1952	Incumbent re-elected.	▌ ✓ Peter Frelinghuysen Jr. (Republican) 68.2%; ▌Robert F. Allen (Democratic) 29.9%; ▌Robert G. Wright (Conservative) 1.9%
New Jersey 6	William T. Cahill	Republican	1958	Incumbent re-elected.	▌ ✓ William T. Cahill (Republican) 65.7%; ▌Robert A. Gasser (Democratic) 33.9%; ▌Bernardo S. Doganiero (Socialist Labor) 0.4%
New Jersey 7	William B. Widnall	Republican	1950	Incumbent re-elected.	▌ ✓ William B. Widnall (Republican) 62.2%; ▌Charles S. Gregg (Democratic) 36.7%; ▌William Craig Kennedy (Conservative) 1.1%
New Jersey 8	Charles S. Joelson	Democratic	1960	Incumbent re-elected.	▌ ✓ Charles S. Joelson (Democratic) 61.4%; ▌Richard M. DeMarco (Republican) 38.2%; ▌Robert Clement (Socialist Labor) 0.4%
New Jersey 9	Henry Helstoski	Democratic	1964	Incumbent re-elected.	▌ ✓ Henry Helstoski (Democratic) 49.8%; ▌Peter Moraites (Republican) 48.6%; ▌Hannibal Cundari (Conservative) 0.8%; ▌Henry Koch (Independent) 0.5%; ▌Henry C. Van Der Osten (American Independent) 0.2%
New Jersey 10	Peter W. Rodino	Democratic	1948	Incumbent re-elected.	▌ ✓ Peter W. Rodino (Democratic) 63.8%; ▌Celestino Clemente (Republican) 34.4%; ▌Harry Press (Socialist Labor) 1.0%; ▌William D. Tyrus (Independent) 0.5%; ▌Leonard Blaschak (Citizens) 0.3%
New Jersey 11	Joseph Minish	Democratic	1962	Incumbent re-elected.	▌ ✓ Joseph Minish (Democratic) 65.5%; ▌George M. Wallhauser Jr. (Republican) 33.2%; ▌William D. Murray (Conservative) 1.0%; ▌Joseph Carroll (Socialist Workers) 0.4%
New Jersey 12	Florence P. Dwyer	Republican	1956	Incumbent re-elected.	▌ ✓ Florence P. Dwyer (Republican) 71.6%; ▌John B. Duff (Democratic) 28.4%
New Jersey 13	Neil Gallagher	Democratic	1958	Incumbent re-elected.	▌ ✓ Neil Gallagher (Democratic) 55.5%; ▌Marion D. Dwyer (Republican) 34.8%; ▌Jeremiah J. O'Callaghan (Independent) 6.3%; ▌Allen Zavadnick (No Addl Taxes) 3.3%
New Jersey 14	Dominick V. Daniels	Democratic	1958	Incumbent re-elected.	▌ ✓ Dominick V. Daniels (Democratic) 58.5%; ▌Joseph Bartletta (Republican) 34.1%; ▌Mervin Murray (Conservative) 5.1%; ▌Vincent L. Vendiramo (No Addl Taxes) 2.3%
New Jersey 15	Edward J. Patten	Democratic	1962	Incumbent re-elected.	▌ ✓ Edward J. Patten (Democratic) 54.6%; ▌George W. Luke (Republican) 44.8%; ▌Joseph J. Hischar (Independent) 0.7%

== New Mexico ==
District	Incumbent	Party	First elected	Result	Candidates
New Mexico 1	Thomas G. Morris; Redistricted from the at-large	Democratic	1958	Incumbent lost re-election. Republican gain.	▌ ✓ Manuel Lujan Jr. (Republican) 52.8%; ▌Thomas G. Morris (Democratic) 46.6%; ▌William Higgs (Independent) 0.5%
New Mexico 2	E. S. Johnny Walker; Redistricted from the at-large	Democratic	1964	Incumbent lost re-election. Republican gain.	▌ ✓ Ed Foreman (Republican) 50.5%; ▌E. S. Johnny Walker (Democratic) 49.1%; ▌Wilfredo Sedillo (Independent) 0.4%

== New York ==
District	Incumbent	Party	First elected	Result	Candidates
New York 1	Otis G. Pike	Democratic	1960	Incumbent re-elected.	▌ ✓ Otis G. Pike (Democratic) 53.9%; ▌James M. Catterson Jr. (Republican) 35.9%; ▌Harold Haar (Conservative) 8.8%; ▌Albert Baron (Liberal) 1.3%
New York 2	James R. Grover Jr.	Republican	1962	Incumbent re-elected.	▌ ✓ James R. Grover Jr. (Republican) 69.0%; ▌Charles A. Heeg (Democratic) 28.5%; ▌Emil Davidson (Liberal) 2.5%
New York 3	Lester L. Wolff	Democratic	1964	Incumbent re-elected.	▌ ✓ Lester L. Wolff (Democratic) 52.1%; ▌Abe Seldin (Republican) 40.2%; ▌Daniel L. Rice (Conservative) 7.7%
New York 4	John W. Wydler	Republican	1962	Incumbent re-elected.	▌ ✓ John W. Wydler (Republican) 70.1%; ▌Michael J. Delguidice (Democratic) 27.2%; ▌Joseph B. Ciaccio (Liberal) 2.6%
New York 5	Herbert Tenzer	Democratic	1964	Incumbent retired. Democratic hold.	▌ ✓ Allard K. Lowenstein (Democratic) 50.7%; ▌Mason L. Hampton Jr. (Republican) 49.3%
New York 6	Seymour Halpern	Republican	1958	Incumbent re-elected.	▌ ✓ Seymour Halpern (Republican) 57.5%; ▌Franklin Miller (Democratic) 30.1%; ▌Thomas J. Adams Jr. (Conservative) 12.4%
New York 7	Joseph P. Addabbo	Democratic	1960	Incumbent re-elected.	▌ ✓ Joseph P. Addabbo (Democratic) 60.9%; ▌Louis R. Mercogliano (Republican) 39.1%
New York 8	Benjamin Rosenthal	Democratic	1962	Incumbent re-elected.	▌ ✓ Benjamin Rosenthal (Democratic) 69.8%; ▌Jack M. Weinstein (Republican) 21.7%; ▌Charles Witteck Jr. (Conservative) 8.5%
New York 9	James J. Delaney	Democratic	1944; 1946 (lost); 1948	Incumbent re-elected.	▌ ✓ James J. Delaney (Democratic) 49.7%; ▌John F. Haggerty (Republican) 42.7%; ▌Rose L. Rubin (Liberal) 6.4%; ▌Benjamin M. Zelman (American Independent) 1.3%
New York 10	Emanuel Celler	Democratic	1922	Incumbent re-elected.	▌ ✓ Emanuel Celler (Democratic) 70.5%; ▌Frank L. Martano (Republican) 29.5%
New York 11	Frank J. Brasco	Democratic	1966	Incumbent re-elected.	▌ ✓ Frank J. Brasco (Democratic) 69.7%; ▌Robert J. Hower (Republican) 18.4%; ▌Basil E. Reynolds (Conservative) 6.6%; ▌Edward L. Johnson (Liberal) 5.3%
New York 12	Edna F. Kelly	Democratic	1949	Incumbent ran in the 10th district and lost renomination there. Democratic hold.	▌ ✓ Shirley Chisholm (Democratic) 66.5%; ▌James Farmer (Republican) 26.3%; ▌Ralph J. Carrano (Conservative) 7.2%
New York 13	Bertram L. Podell	Democratic	1968	Incumbent re-elected.	▌ ✓ Bertram L. Podell (Democratic) 68.2%; ▌Jack Sterngass (Republican) 16.1%; ▌Kenneth Haber (Liberal) 9.7%; ▌Robert C. Laborde Jr. (Conservative) 6.0%
New York 14	John J. Rooney	Democratic	1944	Incumbent re-elected.	▌ ✓ John J. Rooney (Democratic) 63.9%; ▌Victor J. Tirabasso Jr. (Republican) 27.9%; ▌Alice A. Capatosto (Conservative) 8.2%
New York 15	Hugh Carey	Democratic	1960	Incumbent re-elected.	▌ ✓ Hugh Carey (Democratic) 57.6%; ▌Frank C. Spinner (Republican) 30.7%; ▌Stephen P. Marion (Conservative) 7.6%; ▌Vincent T. Mase Jr. (Liberal) 4.1%
New York 16	John M. Murphy	Democratic	1962	Incumbent re-elected.	▌ ✓ John M. Murphy (Democratic) 48.8%; ▌Frank J. Biondolillo (Republican) 46.0%; ▌Joseph Kottler (Liberal) 5.2%
New York 17	Theodore R. Kupferman	Republican	1966	Incumbent retired. Democratic gain.	▌ ✓ Ed Koch (Democratic) 48.5%; ▌Whitney Seymour Jr. (Republican) 45.6%; ▌Richard J. Callahan (Conservative) 5.9%
New York 18	Adam Clayton Powell Jr.	Democratic	1944	Incumbent re-elected.	▌ ✓ Adam Clayton Powell Jr. (Democratic) 80.8%; ▌Henry L. Hall (Republican) 15.7%; ▌Joseph M. McGuire (Conservative) 3.5%
New York 19	Leonard Farbstein	Democratic	1956	Incumbent re-elected.	▌ ✓ Leonard Farbstein (Democratic) 53.3%; ▌Donald E. Weeden (Republican) 33.2%; ▌Ralph Denat (Liberal) 4.9%; ▌David McReynolds (Peace and Freedom) 4.7%; ▌Bella Dodd (Conservative) 3.9%
New York 20	William Fitts Ryan	Democratic	1960	Incumbent re-elected.	▌ ✓ William Fitts Ryan (Democratic) 78.8%; ▌John G. Proudfit (Republican) 16.6%; ▌Ruben Monter (Conservative) 2.6%; ▌Margaret H. Neiderer (Peace and Freedom) 2.0%
New York 21	James H. Scheuer	Democratic	1964	Incumbent re-elected.	▌ ✓ James H. Scheuer (Democratic) 82.6%; ▌Stanley L. Shapiro (Republican) 13.2%; ▌Mario Pichler (Conservative) 3.9%; ▌Olga Bethencourt (Peace and Freedom) 0.3%
New York 22	Jacob H. Gilbert	Democratic	1960	Incumbent re-elected.	▌ ✓ Jacob H. Gilbert (Democratic) 76.2%; ▌James N. Harris (Republican) 12.0%; ▌Sergio S. Pena (Liberal) 7.4%; ▌Juan J. Lugo (Conservative) 4.0%; ▌Grace More Newman (Peace and Freedom) 0.4%
New York 23	Jonathan B. Bingham	Democratic	1964	Incumbent re-elected.	▌ ✓ Jonathan B. Bingham (Democratic) 71.9%; ▌Alexander Sacks (Republican) 28.1%
New York 24	Paul A. Fino	Republican	1952	Incumbent retired to become New York Supreme Court justice. Democratic gain.	▌ ✓ Mario Biaggi (Democratic) 60.5%; ▌Andrew Mantovani (Republican) 33.8%; ▌John P. Hagan (Liberal) 5.6%
New York 25	Richard Ottinger	Democratic	1964	Incumbent re-elected.	▌ ✓ Richard Ottinger (Democratic) 58.6%; ▌Samuel Nakasian (Republican) 34.7%; ▌Anthony J. DeVito (Conservative) 6.8%
New York 26	Ogden R. Reid	Republican	1962	Incumbent re-elected.	▌ ✓ Ogden R. Reid (Republican) 68.1%; ▌Paul Davidoff (Democratic) 23.1%; ▌A. Lining Burnet (Conservative) 8.8%
New York 27	John G. Dow	Democratic	1964	Incumbent lost re-election. Republican gain.	▌ ✓ Martin B. McKneally (Republican) 47.9%; ▌John G. Dow (Democratic) 44.9%; ▌Frederick P. Roland (Conservative) 7.2%
New York 28	Joseph Y. Resnick	Democratic	1964	Incumbent retired to run for U.S. senator. Republican gain.	▌ ✓ Hamilton Fish IV (Republican) 48.1%; ▌John S. Dyson (Democratic) 45.6%; ▌G. Gordon Liddy (Conservative) 4.9%; ▌Peter Kane Dufault (Liberal) 1.3%
New York 29	Daniel E. Button	Republican	1966	Incumbent re-elected.	▌ ✓ Daniel E. Button (Republican) 56.9%; ▌Jacob H. Herzog (Democratic) 42.0%; ▌J. Lawrence Katz (Liberal) 1.1%
New York 30	Carleton J. King	Republican	1960	Incumbent re-elected.	▌ ✓ Carleton J. King (Republican) 66.5%; ▌Orlando B. Potter (Democratic) 33.5%
New York 31	Robert C. McEwen	Republican	1964	Incumbent re-elected.	▌ ✓ Robert C. McEwen (Republican) 58.4%; ▌K. Daniel Haley (Democratic) 40.9%; ▌William F. Delaney (Liberal) 0.7%
New York 32	Alexander Pirnie	Republican	1958	Incumbent re-elected.	▌ ✓ Alexander Pirnie (Republican) 64.1%; ▌Anthony J. Montoya (Democratic) 28.9%; ▌Albert J. Bushong (Conservative) 7.0%
New York 33	Howard W. Robison	Republican	1958	Incumbent re-elected.	▌ ✓ Howard W. Robison (Republican) 68.5%; ▌Benjamin Nichols (Democratic) 31.5%
New York 34	James M. Hanley	Democratic	1964	Incumbent re-elected.	▌ ✓ James M. Hanley (Democratic) 51.3%; ▌David V. O'Brien (Republican) 43.8%; ▌Francis H. Aspinwall (Conservative) 3.7%; ▌Aubrey D. Tussing (Liberal) 1.2%
New York 35	Samuel S. Stratton	Democratic	1958	Incumbent re-elected.	▌ ✓ Samuel S. Stratton (Democratic) 69.4%; ▌George R. Metcalf (Republican) 29.5%; ▌William L. Griffen (Liberal) 1.2%
New York 36	Frank Horton	Republican	1962	Incumbent re-elected.	▌ ✓ Frank Horton (Republican) 70.3%; ▌Augustine J. Marvin (Democratic) 23.4%; ▌Leo J. Kesselring (Conservative) 5.0%; ▌Robert L. Holmes (Liberal) 1.2%
New York 37	Barber Conable	Republican	1964	Incumbent re-elected.	▌ ✓ Barber Conable (Republican) 71.1%; ▌Norman M. Gerhard (Democratic) 27.9%; ▌Berta S. MacKenzie (Liberal) 1.0%
New York 38	Charles Goodell	Republican	1959	Incumbent resigned when appointed U.S. Senator. Republican hold.	▌ ✓ James F. Hastings (Republican) 63.4%; ▌Wilbur White Jr. (Democratic) 33.1%; ▌Gust E. Johnson (Conservative) 2.5%; ▌Charles F. Schwartz (Liberal) 1.0%
New York 39	Richard D. McCarthy	Democratic	1964	Incumbent re-elected.	▌ ✓ Richard D. McCarthy (Democratic) 54.6%; ▌Daniel E. Weber (Republican) 42.0%; ▌John R. Pillion (Conservative) 3.4%
New York 40	Henry P. Smith III	Republican	1964	Incumbent re-elected.	▌ ✓ Henry P. Smith III (Republican) 64.8%; ▌Eugene P. O'Connor (Democratic) 34.0%; ▌James A. Peck (Liberal) 1.2%
New York 41	Thaddeus J. Dulski	Democratic	1958	Incumbent re-elected.	▌ ✓ Thaddeus J. Dulski (Democratic) 77.6%; ▌Edward P. Matter (Republican) 22.4%

== North Carolina ==
District	Incumbent	Party	First elected	Result	Candidates
North Carolina 1	Walter B. Jones Sr.	Democratic	1966	Incumbent re-elected.	▌ ✓ Walter B. Jones Sr. (Democratic) 66.2%; ▌Reece B. Gardner (Republican) 33.8%
North Carolina 2	Lawrence H. Fountain	Democratic	1952	Incumbent re-elected.	▌ ✓ Lawrence H. Fountain (Democratic); Unopposed
North Carolina 2	Jim Gardner; Redistricted from the 4th district	Republican	1966	Incumbent retired to run for governor. Republican loss.	▌ ✓ Lawrence H. Fountain (Democratic); Unopposed
North Carolina 3	David N. Henderson	Democratic	1960	Incumbent re-elected.	▌ ✓ David N. Henderson (Democratic) 54.0%; ▌Herbert H. Howell (Republican) 46.0%
North Carolina 4	Nick Galifianakis; Redistricted from the 5th district	Democratic	1966	Incumbent re-elected.	▌ ✓ Nick Galifianakis (Democratic) 51.5%; ▌Fred Steele (Republican) 48.5%
North Carolina 5	None (district created)			New seat. Republican gain.	▌ ✓ Wilmer Mizell (Republican) 52.4%; ▌Smith Bagley (Democratic) 47.6%
North Carolina 6	Horace R. Kornegay	Democratic	1960	Incumbent retired. Democratic hold.	▌ ✓ L. Richardson Preyer (Democratic) 53.6%; ▌William L. Osteen (Republican) 46.4%
North Carolina 7	Alton Lennon	Democratic	1956	Incumbent re-elected.	▌ ✓ Alton Lennon (Democratic); Unopposed
North Carolina 8	None (district created)			New seat. Republican gain.	▌ ✓ Earl B. Ruth (Republican) 51.2%; ▌Voit Gilmore (Democratic) 48.8%
North Carolina 9	Charles R. Jonas; Redistricted from the 8th district	Republican	1952	Incumbent re-elected.	▌ ✓ Charles R. Jonas (Republican); Unopposed
North Carolina 10	Basil Whitener	Democratic	1956	Redistricting contest. Democratic loss.	▌ ✓ Jim Broyhill (Republican) 54.8%; ▌Basil Whitener (Democratic) 45.2%
North Carolina 10	Jim Broyhill; Redistricted from the 9th district	Republican	1962	Incumbent re-elected.	▌ ✓ Jim Broyhill (Republican) 54.8%; ▌Basil Whitener (Democratic) 45.2%
North Carolina 11	Roy A. Taylor	Democratic	1960	Incumbent re-elected.	▌ ✓ Roy A. Taylor (Democratic) 57.1%; ▌W. Scott Harvey (Republican) 42.9%

== North Dakota ==
District	Incumbent	Party	First elected	Result	Candidates
North Dakota 1	Mark Andrews	Republican	1963	Incumbent re-elected.	▌ ✓ Mark Andrews (Republican) 71.9%; ▌Bruce Hagen (Democratic-NPL) 26.2%; ▌Rosemary Landsberger (Independent) 1.9%
North Dakota 2	Thomas S. Kleppe	Republican	1966	Incumbent re-elected.	▌ ✓ Thomas S. Kleppe (Republican) 49.9%; ▌Rolland W. Redlin (Democratic-NPL) 48.7%; ▌Russell Kleppe (Independent) 1.4%

== Ohio ==
District	Incumbent	Party	First elected	Result	Candidates
Ohio 1	Robert Taft Jr.	Republican	1962; 1964 (retired); 1966	Incumbent re-elected.	▌ ✓ Robert Taft Jr. (Republican) 67.2%; ▌Karl F. Heiser (Democratic) 32.8%
Ohio 2	Donald D. Clancy	Republican	1960	Incumbent re-elected.	▌ ✓ Donald D. Clancy (Republican) 67.4%; ▌Don Driehaus (Democratic) 32.6%
Ohio 3	Charles W. Whalen Jr.	Republican	1966	Incumbent re-elected.	▌ ✓ Charles W. Whalen Jr. (Republican) 78.2%; ▌Paul Tipps (Democratic) 21.8%
Ohio 4	William Moore McCulloch	Republican	1947	Incumbent re-elected.	▌ ✓ William Moore McCulloch (Republican); Unopposed
Ohio 5	Del Latta	Republican	1958	Incumbent re-elected.	▌ ✓ Del Latta (Republican) 71.2%; ▌Louis Richard Batzler (Democratic) 28.8%
Ohio 6	Bill Harsha	Republican	1960	Incumbent re-elected.	▌ ✓ Bill Harsha (Republican) 72.4%; ▌Kenneth L. Kirby (Democratic) 27.6%
Ohio 7	Bud Brown	Republican	1965	Incumbent re-elected.	▌ ✓ Bud Brown (Republican) 63.8%; ▌Robert E. Cecile (Democratic) 36.2%
Ohio 8	Jackson Edward Betts	Republican	1950	Incumbent re-elected.	▌ ✓ Jackson Edward Betts (Republican) 71.4%; ▌Marie Baker (Democratic) 28.6%
Ohio 9	Thomas L. Ashley	Democratic	1954	Incumbent re-elected.	▌ ✓ Thomas L. Ashley (Democratic) 57.4%; ▌Ben Marsh (Republican) 42.6%
Ohio 10	Clarence E. Miller	Republican	1966	Incumbent re-elected.	▌ ✓ Clarence E. Miller (Republican) 69.3%; ▌Harry B. Crewson (Democratic) 30.7%
Ohio 11	J. William Stanton	Republican	1964	Incumbent re-elected.	▌ ✓ J. William Stanton (Republican) 75.3%; ▌Alan D. Wright (Democratic) 24.7%
Ohio 12	Samuel L. Devine	Republican	1958	Incumbent re-elected.	▌ ✓ Samuel L. Devine (Republican) 67.6%; ▌Herbert J. Pfeifer (Democratic) 32.4%
Ohio 13	Charles Adams Mosher	Republican	1960	Incumbent re-elected.	▌ ✓ Charles Adams Mosher (Republican) 61.9%; ▌Adrian F. Betleski (Democratic) 38.1%
Ohio 14	William Hanes Ayres	Republican	1950	Incumbent re-elected.	▌ ✓ William Hanes Ayres (Republican) 55.1%; ▌Oliver Ocasek (Democratic) 44.9%
Ohio 15	Chalmers Wylie	Republican	1966	Incumbent re-elected.	▌ ✓ Chalmers Wylie (Republican) 73.3%; ▌Russel H. Volkema (Republican) 26.7%
Ohio 16	Frank T. Bow	Republican	1950	Incumbent re-elected.	▌ ✓ Frank T. Bow (Republican) 59.6%; ▌Virgil L. Musser (Democratic) 40.4%
Ohio 17	John M. Ashbrook	Republican	1960	Incumbent re-elected.	▌ ✓ John M. Ashbrook (Republican) 64.9%; ▌Robert W. Levering (Democratic) 35.1%
Ohio 18	Wayne Hays	Democratic	1948	Incumbent re-elected.	▌ ✓ Wayne Hays (Democratic) 60.3%; ▌James F. Sutherland (Republican) 39.7%
Ohio 19	Michael J. Kirwan	Democratic	1936	Incumbent re-elected.	▌ ✓ Michael J. Kirwan (Democratic) 69.7%; ▌Donald J. Lewis (Republican) 30.3%
Ohio 20	Michael A. Feighan	Democratic	1942	Incumbent re-elected.	▌ ✓ Michael A. Feighan (Democratic) 72.4%; ▌J. William Petro (Republican) 27.6%
Ohio 21	Charles Vanik	Democratic	1954	Incumbent ran in the 22nd district. Democratic hold.	▌ ✓ Louis Stokes (Democratic) 74.7%; ▌Charles P. Lucas (Republican) 25.3%
Ohio 22	Frances P. Bolton	Republican	1940	Incumbent lost re-election. Democratic gain.	▌ ✓ Charles Vanik (Democratic) 54.7%; ▌Frances P. Bolton (Republican) 45.3%
Ohio 23	William E. Minshall Jr.	Republican	1954	Incumbent re-elected.	▌ ✓ William E. Minshall Jr. (Republican) 52.0%; ▌James V. Stanton (Democratic) 48.0%
Ohio 24	Buz Lukens	Republican	1966	Incumbent re-elected.	▌ ✓ Buz Lukens (Republican) 70.4%; ▌Lloyd D. Miller (Democratic) 29.6%

== Oklahoma ==
District	Incumbent	Party	First elected	Result	Candidates
Oklahoma 1	Page Belcher	Republican	1950	Incumbent re-elected.	▌ ✓ Page Belcher (Republican) 59.3%; ▌John B. Jarboe (Democratic) 40.7%
Oklahoma 2	Ed Edmondson	Democratic	1952	Incumbent re-elected.	▌ ✓ Ed Edmondson (Democratic) 54.9%; ▌Robert G. Smith (Republican) 45.1%
Oklahoma 3	Carl Albert	Democratic	1946	Incumbent re-elected.	▌ ✓ Carl Albert (Democratic) 68.4%; ▌Gerald L. Beasley Jr. (Republican) 31.6%
Oklahoma 4	Tom Steed	Democratic	1948	Incumbent re-elected.	▌ ✓ Tom Steed (Democratic) 53.6%; ▌James Vernon Smith (Republican) 46.4%
Oklahoma 4	James Vernon Smith; Redistricted from the 6th district	Republican	1966	Redistricting contest. Republican loss.	▌ ✓ Tom Steed (Democratic) 53.6%; ▌James Vernon Smith (Republican) 46.4%
Oklahoma 5	John Jarman	Democratic	1950	Incumbent re-elected.	▌ ✓ John Jarman (Democratic) 73.6%; ▌Bob Leeper (Republican) 26.4%
Oklahoma 6	None (district created)			New seat. Republican gain.	▌ ✓ John Newbold Camp (Republican) 55.3%; ▌John W. Goodwin (Democratic) 44.7%

== Oregon ==
District	Incumbent	Party	First elected	Result	Candidates
Oregon 1	Wendell Wyatt	Republican	1964	Incumbent re-elected.	▌ ✓ Wendell Wyatt (Republican) 80.6%; ▌Thomas M. Baggs (Democratic) 19.4%
Oregon 2	Al Ullman	Democratic	1956	Incumbent re-elected.	▌ ✓ Al Ullman (Democratic) 63.9%; ▌Marv Root (Republican) 36.1%
Oregon 3	Edith Green	Democratic	1954	Incumbent re-elected.	▌ ✓ Edith Green (Democratic) 69.9%; ▌Douglas S. Warren (Republican) 30.1%
Oregon 4	John R. Dellenback	Republican	1966	Incumbent re-elected.	▌ ✓ John R. Dellenback (Republican) 58.9%; ▌Edward Fadeley (Democratic) 41.1%

== Pennsylvania ==
District	Incumbent	Party	First elected	Result	Candidates
Pennsylvania 1	William A. Barrett	Democratic	1944; 1946 (lost); 1948	Incumbent re-elected.	▌ ✓ William A. Barrett (Democratic) 74.7%; ▌Leslie Carson Jr. (Republican) 25.3%
Pennsylvania 2	Robert N. C. Nix Sr.	Democratic	1958	Incumbent re-elected.	▌ ✓ Robert N. C. Nix Sr. (Democratic) 70.0%; ▌Herbert P. McMaster (Republican) 30.0%
Pennsylvania 3	James A. Byrne	Democratic	1952	Incumbent re-elected.	▌ ✓ James A. Byrne (Democratic) 61.3%; ▌Richard R. Block (Republican) 38.7%
Pennsylvania 4	Joshua Eilberg	Democratic	1966	Incumbent re-elected.	▌ ✓ Joshua Eilberg (Democratic) 59.3%; ▌Alexander Kaptik (Republican) 39.7%; ▌Paul D. Corbett (Constitution) 1.0%
Pennsylvania 5	William J. Green III	Democratic	1964	Incumbent re-elected.	▌ ✓ William J. Green III (Democratic) 69.1%; ▌Gregory J. Meade (Republican) 30.9%
Pennsylvania 6	George M. Rhodes	Democratic	1948	Incumbent retired. Democratic hold.	▌ ✓ Gus Yatron (Democratic) 51.4%; ▌Peter Yonavick (Republican) 47.5%; ▌Joseph G. Brewer (Constitution) 1.0%
Pennsylvania 7	Lawrence G. Williams	Republican	1966	Incumbent re-elected.	▌ ✓ Lawrence G. Williams (Republican) 56.5%; ▌Edward J. O. Halloren (Democratic) 42.7%; ▌John Phillips (Constitution) 0.8%
Pennsylvania 8	Edward G. Biester Jr.	Republican	1966	Incumbent re-elected.	▌ ✓ Edward G. Biester Jr. (Republican) 58.0%; ▌Richard M. Hepburn (Democratic) 37.1%; ▌E. Stanley Rittenhouse (Constitution) 5.0%
Pennsylvania 9	George Watkins	Republican	1964	Incumbent re-elected.	▌ ✓ George Watkins (Republican) 62.9%; ▌Philip L. Harding (Democratic) 35.4%; ▌William J. Schoble (Constitution) 1.7%
Pennsylvania 10	Joseph M. McDade	Republican	1962	Incumbent re-elected.	▌ ✓ Joseph M. McDade (Republican) 66.6%; ▌Robert J. Landy (Democratic) 32.8%; ▌Eugene Bancale (Constitution) 0.6%
Pennsylvania 11	Dan Flood	Democratic	1944; 1946 (lost); 1948; 1952 (lost); 1954	Incumbent re-elected.	▌ ✓ Dan Flood (Democratic) 70.0%; ▌Stanley Bunn (Republican) 28.5%; ▌Dawn M. Baker (Constitution) 1.5%
Pennsylvania 12	J. Irving Whalley	Republican	1960	Incumbent re-elected.	▌ ✓ J. Irving Whalley (Republican) 67.5%; ▌J. Robert Rohm (Democratic) 31.5%; ▌Herman D. Beatty (Independent) 1.0%
Pennsylvania 13	Richard Schweiker	Republican	1960	Incumbent retired to run for U.S. senator. Republican hold.	▌ ✓ Lawrence Coughlin (Republican) 62.0%; ▌William D. Searle (Democratic) 36.8%; ▌John S. Matthews (Constitution) 1.2%
Pennsylvania 14	William S. Moorhead	Democratic	1958	Incumbent re-elected.	▌ ✓ William S. Moorhead (Democratic) 69.4%; ▌Algia Gary (Republican) 28.7%; ▌Harvey F. Johnston (Constitution) 1.9%
Pennsylvania 15	Fred B. Rooney	Democratic	1963	Incumbent re-elected.	▌ ✓ Fred B. Rooney (Democratic) 58.8%; ▌Paul E. Henderson (Republican) 38.7%; ▌Peter G. Cohen (Common Sense) 1.5%; ▌Chester R. Litz (Constitution) 0.9%
Pennsylvania 16	Edwin D. Eshleman	Republican	1966	Incumbent re-elected.	▌ ✓ Edwin D. Eshleman (Republican) 68.9%; ▌Robert M. Going (Democratic) 27.5%; ▌Lloyd G. Cope (Constitution) 3.6%
Pennsylvania 17	Herman T. Schneebeli	Republican	1960	Incumbent re-elected.	▌ ✓ Herman T. Schneebeli (Republican) 66.2%; ▌Donald J. Rippon (Democratic) 31.7%; ▌Andrew J. Watson (Constitution) 2.1%
Pennsylvania 18	Robert J. Corbett	Republican	1938; 1940 (lost); 1944	Incumbent re-elected.	▌ ✓ Robert J. Corbett (Republican) 62.7%; ▌William T. Sherman (Democratic) 35.3%; ▌Robert Werle Jr. (Constitution) 2.1%
Pennsylvania 19	George A. Goodling	Republican	1960; 1964 (lost); 1966	Incumbent re-elected.	▌ ✓ George A. Goodling (Republican) 57.7%; ▌Robert L. Myers III (Democratic) 40.8%; ▌Carl M. Richter (Constitution) 1.5%
Pennsylvania 20	Elmer J. Holland	Democratic	1942 (special); 1942 (retired); 1956 (special)	Incumbent died. Democratic hold.	▌ ✓ Joseph M. Gaydos (Democratic) 70.2%; ▌Joseph Sabol Jr. (Republican) 28.3%; ▌Clayton Fox (Constitution) 1.5%
Pennsylvania 21	John Herman Dent	Democratic	1958	Incumbent re-elected.	▌ ✓ John Herman Dent (Democratic) 62.8%; ▌Thomas H. Young (Republican) 37.2%
Pennsylvania 22	John P. Saylor	Republican	1949	Incumbent re-elected.	▌ ✓ John P. Saylor (Republican) 58.0%; ▌John Murtha (Democratic) 42.0%
Pennsylvania 23	Albert W. Johnson	Republican	1963	Incumbent re-elected.	▌ ✓ Albert W. Johnson (Republican) 61.5%; ▌Alan R. Cleeton (Democratic) 38.0%; ▌Richard H. Buckle (Constitution) 0.5%
Pennsylvania 24	Joseph P. Vigorito	Democratic	1964	Incumbent re-elected.	▌ ✓ Joseph P. Vigorito (Democratic) 61.1%; ▌John V. Edwards (Republican) 38.0%; ▌Myron S. Hopkins (Independent) 0.9%
Pennsylvania 25	Frank M. Clark	Democratic	1954	Incumbent re-elected.	▌ ✓ Frank M. Clark (Democratic) 63.1%; ▌Richard L. Doolittle (Republican) 35.8%; ▌Albert Thornton (Constitution) 1.2%
Pennsylvania 26	Thomas E. Morgan	Democratic	1944	Incumbent re-elected.	▌ ✓ Thomas E. Morgan (Democratic) 63.6%; ▌Paul P. Riggle (Republican) 33.6%; ▌Arleign Cale (Constitution) 2.8%
Pennsylvania 27	James G. Fulton	Republican	1944	Incumbent re-elected.	▌ ✓ James G. Fulton (Republican) 66.7%; ▌Joseph L. Cosetti (Democratic) 31.9%; ▌Harvey F. Johnston (Constitution) 1.4%

== Rhode Island ==
District	Incumbent	Party	First elected	Result	Candidates
Rhode Island 1	Fernand St Germain	Democratic	1960	Incumbent re-elected.	▌ ✓ Fernand St Germain (Democratic) 60.4%; ▌Lincoln Almond (Republican) 38.5%; ▌Joseph O'Brien (Independent) 1.0%; ▌Louis O'Hara (Independent) 0.1%
Rhode Island 2	Robert Tiernan	Democratic	1967	Incumbent re-elected.	▌ ✓ Robert Tiernan (Democratic) 61.2%; ▌Howard Russell (Republican) 38.8%

== South Carolina ==
District	Incumbent	Party	First elected	Result	Candidates
South Carolina 1	L. Mendel Rivers	Democratic	1940	Incumbent re-elected.	▌ ✓ L. Mendel Rivers (Democratic); Unopposed
South Carolina 2	Albert Watson	Republican	1962	Incumbent re-elected.	▌ ✓ Albert Watson (Republican) 57.6%; ▌Frank K. Sloan (Democratic) 42.4%
South Carolina 3	William J. B. Dorn	Democratic	1946; 1948 (retired); 1950	Incumbent re-elected.	▌ ✓ William J. B. Dorn (Democratic) 66.1%; ▌John Grisso (Republican) 31.6%; ▌J. Harold Morton (Independent) 2.2%
South Carolina 4	Robert T. Ashmore	Democratic	1953	Incumbent retired. Democratic hold.	▌ ✓ James Mann (Democratic) 61.2%; ▌Charles Bradshaw (Republican) 38.8%
South Carolina 5	Thomas S. Gettys	Democratic	1964	Incumbent re-elected.	▌ ✓ Thomas S. Gettys (Democratic) 74.7%; ▌Hugh J. Boyd (Republican) 21.8%; ▌Bert Sumner (Independent) 3.5%
South Carolina 6	John L. McMillan	Democratic	1938	Incumbent re-elected.	▌ ✓ John L. McMillan (Democratic) 58.3%; ▌Ray Harris (Republican) 39.9%; ▌Claude E. Harris (Independent) 1.8%

== South Dakota ==
District	Incumbent	Party	First elected	Result	Candidates
South Dakota 1	Ben Reifel	Republican	1960	Incumbent re-elected.	▌ ✓ Ben Reifel (Republican) 58.0%; ▌Frank E. Denholm (Democratic) 42.0%
South Dakota 2	E. Y. Berry	Republican	1950	Incumbent re-elected.	▌ ✓ E. Y. Berry (Republican) 59.3%; ▌David Garner (Democratic) 40.7%

== Tennessee ==
District	Incumbent	Party	First elected	Result	Candidates
Tennessee 1	Jimmy Quillen	Republican	1962	Incumbent re-elected.	▌ ✓ Jimmy Quillen (Republican) 85.2%; ▌Arthur Bright (Democratic) 14.8%
Tennessee 2	John Duncan Sr.	Republican	1964	Incumbent re-elected.	▌ ✓ John Duncan Sr. (Republican) 82.4%; ▌Jake Armstrong (Democratic) 14.8%; ▌Wilburt J. Hinton (American Independent) 2.9%
Tennessee 3	Bill Brock	Republican	1962	Incumbent re-elected.	▌ ✓ Bill Brock (Republican) 57.0%; ▌J. William Pope Jr. (Democratic) 43.0%
Tennessee 4	Joe L. Evins	Democratic	1946	Incumbent re-elected.	▌ ✓ Joe L. Evins (Democratic) 75.9%; ▌J. D. Boles (Republican) 24.1%
Tennessee 5	Richard Fulton	Democratic	1962	Incumbent re-elected.	▌ ✓ Richard Fulton (Democratic) 48.7%; ▌George Kelly (Republican) 42.2%; ▌William F. Burton Jr. (American Independent) 9.1%
Tennessee 6	William Anderson	Democratic	1964	Incumbent re-elected.	▌ ✓ William Anderson (Democratic) 59.4%; ▌Ronnie Page (Republican) 40.6%
Tennessee 7	Ray Blanton	Democratic	1966	Incumbent re-elected.	▌ ✓ Ray Blanton (Democratic) 66.1%; ▌John T. Williams (Republican) 33.9%
Tennessee 8	Fats Everett	Democratic	1958	Incumbent re-elected.	▌ ✓ Fats Everett (Democratic); Unopposed
Tennessee 9	Dan Kuykendall	Republican	1966	Incumbent re-elected.	▌ ✓ Dan Kuykendall (Republican) 59.4%; ▌James E. Irwin (Democratic) 36.8%; ▌Claude Cockrell (Independent) 3.0%; ▌C. Gordon Vick (Independent) 0.8%

== Texas ==
District	Incumbent	Party	First elected	Result	Candidates
Texas 1	Wright Patman	Democratic	1928	Incumbent re-elected.	▌ ✓ Wright Patman (Democratic); Unopposed
Texas 2	John Dowdy	Democratic	1952	Incumbent re-elected.	▌ ✓ John Dowdy (Democratic); Unopposed
Texas 3	James M. Collins	Republican	1968	Incumbent re-elected.	▌ ✓ James M. Collins (Republican) 59.4%; ▌Robert H. Hughes (Democratic) 40.6%
Texas 4	Ray Roberts	Democratic	1962	Incumbent re-elected.	▌ ✓ Ray Roberts (Democratic); Unopposed
Texas 5	Earle Cabell	Democratic	1964	Incumbent re-elected.	▌ ✓ Earle Cabell (Democratic) 61.4%; ▌Roy Wagoner (Republican) 38.6%
Texas 6	Olin E. Teague	Democratic	1946	Incumbent re-elected.	▌ ✓ Olin E. Teague (Democratic); Unopposed
Texas 7	George H. W. Bush	Republican	1966	Incumbent re-elected.	▌ ✓ George H. W. Bush (Republican); Unopposed
Texas 8	Bob Eckhardt	Democratic	1966	Incumbent re-elected.	▌ ✓ Bob Eckhardt (Democratic) 70.6%; ▌Joe Stevens (Republican) 29.4%
Texas 9	Jack Brooks	Democratic	1952	Incumbent re-elected.	▌ ✓ Jack Brooks (Democratic) 60.6%; ▌Henry C. Pressler (Democratic) 39.4%
Texas 10	J. J. Pickle	Democratic	1963	Incumbent re-elected.	▌ ✓ J. J. Pickle (Democratic) 62.1%; ▌Ray Gabler (Republican) 37.9%
Texas 11	William R. Poage	Democratic	1936	Incumbent re-elected.	▌ ✓ William R. Poage (Democratic) 96.5%; ▌Laurel N. Dunn (Republican) 3.5%
Texas 12	Jim Wright	Democratic	1954	Incumbent re-elected.	▌ ✓ Jim Wright (Democratic); Unopposed
Texas 13	Graham B. Purcell Jr.	Democratic	1962	Incumbent re-elected.	▌ ✓ Graham B. Purcell Jr. (Democratic) 55.8%; ▌Frank Crowley (Republican) 44.2%
Texas 14	John Andrew Young	Democratic	1956	Incumbent re-elected.	▌ ✓ John Andrew Young (Democratic); Unopposed
Texas 15	Kika de la Garza	Democratic	1964	Incumbent re-elected.	▌ ✓ Kika de la Garza (Democratic); Unopposed
Texas 16	Richard Crawford White	Democratic	1964	Incumbent re-elected.	▌ ✓ Richard Crawford White (Democratic) 73.5%; ▌Don Slaughter (Republican) 26.5%
Texas 17	Omar Burleson	Democratic	1946	Incumbent re-elected.	▌ ✓ Omar Burleson (Democratic); Unopposed
Texas 18	Robert Price	Republican	1966	Incumbent re-elected.	▌ ✓ Robert Price (Republican) 65.2%; ▌J. R. Brown (Democratic) 34.8%
Texas 19	George H. Mahon	Democratic	1934	Incumbent re-elected.	▌ ✓ George H. Mahon (Democratic); Unopposed
Texas 20	Henry B. González	Democratic	1961	Incumbent re-elected.	▌ ✓ Henry B. González (Democratic) 81.5%; ▌Robert A. Schneider (Republican) 18.5%
Texas 21	O. C. Fisher	Democratic	1942	Incumbent re-elected.	▌ ✓ O. C. Fisher (Democratic) 60.8%; ▌W. J. "Jack" Alexander (Republican) 39.2%
Texas 22	Robert R. Casey	Democratic	1958	Incumbent re-elected.	▌ ✓ Robert R. Casey (Democratic) 62.4%; ▌Walter Blaney (Republican) 37.6%
Texas 23	Abraham Kazen	Democratic	1966	Incumbent re-elected.	▌ ✓ Abraham Kazen (Democratic); Unopposed

== Utah ==
District	Incumbent	Party	First elected	Result	Candidates
Utah 1	Laurence J. Burton	Republican	1962	Incumbent re-elected.	▌ ✓ Laurence J. Burton (Republican) 68.1%; ▌Richard J. Maughab (Democratic) 31.9%
Utah 2	Sherman P. Lloyd	Republican	1962; 1964 (retired); 1966	Incumbent re-elected.	▌ ✓ Sherman P. Lloyd (Republican) 61.6%; ▌Galen J. Ross (Democratic) 38.4%

== Vermont ==
District	Incumbent	Party	First elected	Result	Candidates
Vermont at-large	Robert Stafford	Republican	1960	Incumbent re-elected.	▌ ✓ Robert Stafford (Republican); Unopposed

== Virginia ==
District	Incumbent	Party	First elected	Result	Candidates
Virginia 1	Thomas N. Downing	Democratic	1958	Incumbent re-elected.	▌ ✓ Thomas N. Downing (Democratic) 73.0%; ▌J. Cornelius Fauntleroy Jr. (Independent) 14.6%; ▌James S. Stafford (Republican) 12.5%
Virginia 2	Porter Hardy Jr.	Democratic	1946	Incumbent retired. Republican gain.	▌ ✓ G. William Whitehurst (Republican) 54.2%; ▌Frederick T. Stant Jr. (Democratic) 45.8%
Virginia 3	David E. Satterfield III	Democratic	1964	Incumbent re-elected.	▌ ✓ David E. Satterfield III (Democratic) 60.3%; ▌John S. Hansen (Republican) 39.7%
Virginia 4	Watkins Abbitt	Democratic	1948	Incumbent re-elected.	▌ ✓ Watkins Abbitt (Democratic) 71.5%; ▌S. W. Tucker (Republican) 28.5%
Virginia 5	William M. Tuck	Democratic	1953	Incumbent retired. Democratic hold.	▌ ✓ Dan Daniel (Democratic) 54.6%; ▌Weldon W. Tuck (Republican) 26.7%; ▌Ruth L. Harvey (Independent) 18.7%
Virginia 6	Richard H. Poff	Republican	1952	Incumbent re-elected.	▌ ✓ Richard H. Poff (Republican) 92.7%; ▌Tom Hufford (Democratic) 7.3%
Virginia 7	John O. Marsh Jr.	Democratic	1962	Incumbent re-elected.	▌ ✓ John O. Marsh Jr. (Democratic) 54.4%; ▌Pete Giesen (Republican) 43.2%; ▌Louis A. Brooks Jr. (Conservative) 2.4%
Virginia 8	William L. Scott	Republican	1966	Incumbent re-elected.	▌ ✓ William L. Scott (Republican) 64.9%; ▌Andrew H. McCutcheon (Democratic) 35.1%
Virginia 9	William C. Wampler	Republican	1952; 1954 (lost); 1966	Incumbent re-elected.	▌ ✓ William C. Wampler (Republican) 59.9%; ▌Joseph P. Johnson Jr. (Democratic) 40.1%
Virginia 10	Joel Broyhill	Republican	1952	Incumbent re-elected.	▌ ✓ Joel Broyhill (Republican) 59.8%; ▌David B. Kinney (Democratic) 40.2%

== Washington ==
District	Incumbent	Party	First elected	Result	Candidates
Washington 1	Thomas Pelly	Republican	1952	Incumbent re-elected.	▌ ✓ Thomas Pelly (Republican) 61.4%; ▌Don Cole (Democratic) 37.7%; ▌Judith Shapiro (Peace and Freedom) 0.9%
Washington 2	Lloyd Meeds	Democratic	1964	Incumbent re-elected.	▌ ✓ Lloyd Meeds (Democratic) 56.2%; ▌Wally Turner (Republican) 43.8%
Washington 3	Julia Butler Hansen	Democratic	1960	Incumbent re-elected.	▌ ✓ Julia Butler Hansen (Democratic) 56.8%; ▌Wayne M. Adams (Republican) 43.2%
Washington 4	Catherine Dean May	Republican	1958	Incumbent re-elected.	▌ ✓ Catherine Dean May (Republican) 66.8%; ▌Lee Lukson (Democratic) 33.2%
Washington 5	Tom Foley	Democratic	1964	Incumbent re-elected.	▌ ✓ Tom Foley (Democratic) 56.8%; ▌Dick Bond (Republican) 43.2%
Washington 6	Floyd Hicks	Democratic	1964	Incumbent re-elected.	▌ ✓ Floyd Hicks (Democratic) 55.8%; ▌Anthony Chase (Republican) 43.1%; ▌Betty Jane Hiegel (Conservative) 1.0%
Washington 7	Brock Adams	Democratic	1964	Incumbent re-elected.	▌ ✓ Brock Adams (Democratic) 65.6%; ▌Robert Eberle (Republican) 34.0%; ▌Flo Ware (Peace and Freedom) 0.4%

== West Virginia ==
District	Incumbent	Party	First elected	Result	Candidates
West Virginia 1	Arch A. Moore Jr.	Republican	1956	Incumbent retired to run for governor. Democratic gain.	▌ ✓ Bob Mollohan (Democratic) 53.9%; ▌Tom Sweeney (Republican) 46.1%
West Virginia 2	Harley Orrin Staggers	Democratic	1948	Incumbent re-elected.	▌ ✓ Harley Orrin Staggers (Democratic) 61.5%; ▌George L. Strader (Republican) 38.5%
West Virginia 3	John M. Slack Jr.	Democratic	1958	Incumbent re-elected.	▌ ✓ John M. Slack Jr. (Democratic) 60.5%; ▌Neal A. Kinsolving (Republican) 39.5%
West Virginia 4	Ken Hechler	Democratic	1958	Incumbent re-elected.	▌ ✓ Ken Hechler (Democratic) 64.2%; ▌Ralph Lewis Shannon (Republican) 35.8%
West Virginia 5	James Kee	Democratic	1964	Incumbent re-elected.	▌ ✓ James Kee (Democratic) 66.2%; ▌J. Donald Clark (Republican) 33.8%

== Wisconsin ==
District	Incumbent	Party	First elected	Result	Candidates
Wisconsin 1	Henry C. Schadeberg	Republican	1960; 1964 (lost); 1966	Incumbent re-elected.	▌ ✓ Henry C. Schadeberg (Republican) 50.9%; ▌Lynn E. Stalbaum (Democratic) 49.1%
Wisconsin 2	Robert Kastenmeier	Democratic	1958	Incumbent re-elected.	▌ ✓ Robert Kastenmeier (Democratic) 59.9%; ▌Richard D. Murray (Republican) 40.1%
Wisconsin 3	Vernon W. Thomson	Republican	1960	Incumbent re-elected.	▌ ✓ Vernon W. Thomson (Republican) 63.7%; ▌Gunnar A. Gunderson (Democratic) 36.3%
Wisconsin 4	Clement Zablocki	Democratic	1948	Incumbent re-elected.	▌ ✓ Clement Zablocki (Democratic) 72.6%; ▌Walter McCullough (Republican) 27.4%
Wisconsin 5	Henry S. Reuss	Democratic	1954	Incumbent re-elected.	▌ ✓ Henry S. Reuss (Democratic) 67.8%; ▌Robert J. Dwyer (Republican) 31.4%; ▌Julian R. Chapman (American Independent) 0.8%
Wisconsin 6	William A. Steiger	Republican	1966	Incumbent re-elected.	▌ ✓ William A. Steiger (Republican) 64.0%; ▌John Abner Race (Democratic) 34.3%; ▌Albert Balthazor Jr. (Conservative) 1.7%
Wisconsin 7	Melvin Laird	Republican	1952	Incumbent re-elected.	▌ ✓ Melvin Laird (Republican) 64.1%; ▌Lawrence Dahl (Democratic) 35.9%
Wisconsin 8	John W. Byrnes	Republican	1944	Incumbent re-elected.	▌ ✓ John W. Byrnes (Republican) 68.0%; ▌John E. Nixon (Democratic) 32.0%
Wisconsin 9	Glenn Robert Davis	Republican	1947 (special); 1956 (retired); 1964	Incumbent re-elected.	▌ ✓ Glenn Robert Davis (Republican) 63.1%; ▌Carol E. Baumann (Democratic) 36.9%
Wisconsin 10	Alvin O'Konski	Republican	1942	Incumbent re-elected.	▌ ✓ Alvin O'Konski (Republican) 65.9%; ▌Timothy J. Hirsch (Democratic) 34.1%

== Wyoming ==
District	Incumbent	Party	First elected	Result	Candidates
Wyoming at-large	William Henry Harrison III	Republican	1950; 1954 (retired); 1960; 1964 (lost); 1966	Incumbent lost renomination. Republican hold.	▌ ✓ John S. Wold (Republican) 62.7%; ▌Velma Linford (Democratic) 37.3%

== See also ==
- 1968 United States elections
  - 1968 United States gubernatorial elections
  - 1968 United States Senate elections
- 90th United States Congress
- 91st United States Congress

== Works cited ==
- Abramson, Paul; Aldrich, John; Rohde, David (1995). Change and Continuity in the 1992 Elections. CQ Press. ISBN 0871878399.
