= J. T. Rutherford =

American politician

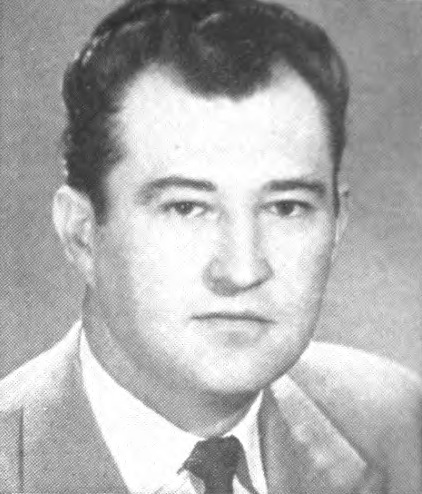

Member of the U.S. House of Representatives from Texas's 16th district
- In office January 3, 1955 – January 3, 1963
- Preceded by: Kenneth M. Regan
- Succeeded by: Ed Foreman

Member of the Texas Senate from the 29th district
- In office January 13, 1953 – September 27, 1954
- Preceded by: Hill D. Hudson
- Succeeded by: Frank Owen, III

Member of the Texas House of Representatives from the 88th district
- In office January 11, 1949 – January 13, 1953
- Preceded by: George W. Elliott
- Succeeded by: Elbert Reeves

Personal details
- Born: J. T. Rutherford; May 30, 1921 Hot Springs, Arkansas, U.S.
- Died: November 6, 2006 (aged 85) Arlington, Virginia, U.S.
- Party: Democratic
- Spouse: Sara Jane Armstrong (m. 1948; died 2004)
- Children: 3
- Education: Angelo State University; Sul Ross State University; Baylor Law School

Military service
- Allegiance: United States
- Branch/service: United States Marine Corps
- Years of service: 1942–1946
- Rank: Major
- Battles/wars: World War II; D-Day; Pacific Theater of Operations

J. T. Rutherford (May 30, 1921 – November 6, 2006), was an American lawyer and World War II veteran who served as a Democratic United States representative for four terms from 1955 to 1963. He previously served as a state legislator from the state of Texas.

== Early life and career ==
He was born to James Thaddeus Rutherford and the former Nancy Lillian Johnson in Hot Springs, Arkansas. In 1934, his family relocated to Odessa, Texas, where he attended public schools.

=== World War II ===
He served as an enlisted man in the United States Marine Corps from 1942 to 1946, of which twenty-eight months were spent overseas. He was awarded the Purple Heart. As an assault amphibian vehicle crewman, he landed in the first waves on D-Day at Tarawa, Saipan, where he was wounded, and Tinian. He retired as a major in the United States Marine Corps Reserve.

=== Business career ===
From 1946 to 1947, Rutherford studied at San Angelo College in San Angelo. He then transferred to Sul Ross State College in Alpine, which he attended from 1947 to 1948. From 1948 to 1950, he attended Baylor Law School in Waco, Texas.

In 1948, Rutherford married the former Sara Jane Armstrong, and the couple had three children, Cleo Ann, Charles Lane Rutherford, and Jane Ellen. Rutherford was a partner in an industrial electrical construction firm and also owned an advertising business.

== Political career ==
Rutherford served in the Texas House of Representatives from 1948 to 1952 and the Texas State Senate from 1953 to 1954.

=== Congress ===
He was elected to the 84th to 87th United States Congresses from January 3, 1955, to January 3, 1963. An unsuccessful candidate for re-election in 1962 to the 88th United States Congress, Rutherford was unseated by Republican Ed Foreman of Odessa, later of Dallas. His loss to Foreman was attributed to the Billie Sol Estes scandal. He missed only one floor vote of the several thousand cast while he was a representative.

He was one of the majority of the Texan delegation to decline to sign the 1956 Southern Manifesto opposing the desegregation of public schools ordered by the Supreme Court in Brown v. Board of Education. Rutherford voted against the Civil Rights Acts of 1957 and 1960, but voted in favor of the 24th Amendment to the U.S. Constitution.

He was the first chairman of the House Subcommittee on National Parks. He was awarded the U.S. Department of Interior's Conservation Service Award in 1962 for his efforts to spearhead conservation legislation including laws that created a new national seashore on Padre Island, Cape Cod National Seashore, and Point Reyes in California.

Rutherford's district was the old jumbo 16th district, Midland being its eastmost point and El Paso at its westmost. It also stretched hundreds of miles along the border with Mexico. The 19 counties it embraced covered 42,067 square miles—making it geographically larger than Ohio or Tennessee, among other states.

== Later career and death ==
After leaving Congress, he formed J. T. Rutherford and Associates, a government relations consulting firm. He was a director of the Gonzales Warm Springs Foundation for Crippled Children, which was established in 1943 in Gonzales County, Texas. He was also a Shriner, another group which promotes the welfare of crippled children.

=== Death ===
Rutherford died of complications of Alzheimer's disease in Arlington, Virginia, where he spent his later years.

Texas House of Representatives
Preceded by George W. Elliott	Member of the Texas House of Representatives from District 88 (Odessa); 1949–1953	Succeeded by Elbert Reeves
Texas Senate
Preceded by Hill D. Hudson	Texas State Senator from District 29 (Odessa); 1953–1954	Succeeded by Frank Owen, III
U.S. House of Representatives
Preceded by Kenneth M. Regan	Member of the U.S. House of Representatives from Texas's 16th congressional district 1955–1963	Succeeded by Ed Foreman
