= Richard Crawford White =

United States politician

Richard White
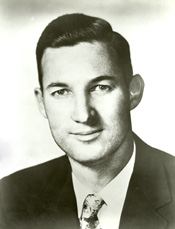

Member of the U.S. House of Representatives from Texas's 16th district
- In office January 3, 1965 – January 3, 1983
- Preceded by: Ed Foreman
- Succeeded by: Ronald D. Coleman

Member of the Texas House of Representatives from the 105-3 district
- In office January 11, 1955 – January 13, 1959
- Preceded by: Frank Owen III
- Succeeded by: Mauro Rosas

Personal details
- Born: Richard Crawford White; April 29, 1923 El Paso, Texas, U.S.
- Died: February 18, 1998 (aged 74) El Paso, Texas, U.S.
- Resting place: Arlington National Cemetery
- Party: Democratic
- Spouses: Cathy Huffman (m. 1949; died 1972); Kathleen Fitzgerald (m. 1973)
- Children: 7
- Education: University of Texas, El Paso (attended); University of Texas, Austin (BA, LLB)

Military service
- Allegiance: United States
- Branch/service: United States Marine Corps
- Years of service: 1942–1945
- Unit: 3rd Marine Division
- Battles/wars: World War II • Pacific War
- Awards: Purple Heart

Richard Crawford White (April 29, 1923 – February 18, 1998) was an American lawyer, World War II veteran, and Democratic politician from El Paso, Texas, who served in the Texas House of Representatives from 1955 to 1959 and in the U.S. House of Representatives from 1965 to 1983.

== Early life and career ==
Born in El Paso, Texas, White graduated from Dudley Primary School, El Paso High School, and the Citizens' Military Training Camp at San Antonio, Texas. Subsequently, from 1940 to 1942, he attended the University of Texas at El Paso, then known as Texas Western College.

=== World War II ===
After his second year of college, White began his World War II service from 1942 to 1945 in the United States Marine Corps as a rifleman and Japanese-English interpreter in the Pacific Theater. As a result of injuries suffered, he was awarded the Purple Heart.

== Tenure in Congress ==
He actually received more votes than Johnson did in the 16th District.

During his first term, White represented a monstrous district stretching from El Paso all the way to the Permian Basin—an area of over 42,000 square miles. However, after Texas' congressional map was thrown out in Wesberry v. Sanders, his district was cut down to El Paso and a few inner-ring suburbs. He was reelected eight times from this district with almost no difficulty.

As a U.S. representative, White developed a reputation as a moderate Democrat. White voted in favor the Voting Rights Act of 1965 and the Civil Rights Act of 1968. He also chaired the Democratic Research Organization, a group within the party that distributed information from the leadership relevant to pending votes. Having Fort Bliss in the 16th Congressional District made White a natural choice for his place on the House Armed Services Committee. There he chaired the Military Personnel Subcommittee and was also instrumental in reorganization of the Joint Chiefs of Staff. He also served for a while on the Interior, Post Office & Civil Service, and Science & Technology committees. White was described as a 'cautious conservative'. Choosing not to run again in 1982, White returned to his hometown of El Paso to resume his law practice.

== Personal life ==
White was married twice. His first marriage in 1949 to Katherine Huffman produced three sons, Rodrick, Richard, and Raymond. After her death in 1972, White married the former Kathleen Fitzgerald in 1973. The second marriage produced one daughter, Bonnie, two sons, Sean and Brian, and one step-son, Kenneth.

== Death and burial ==
White died on February 18, 1998. He was interred at Arlington National Cemetery, in Arlington, Virginia.

U.S. House of Representatives
Preceded by Ed Foreman	Member of the U.S. House of Representatives from Texas's 16th congressional district 1965–1983	Succeeded by Ronald D. Coleman
