= Kenneth M. Regan =

American politician (1891–1959)

Kenneth Mills Regan
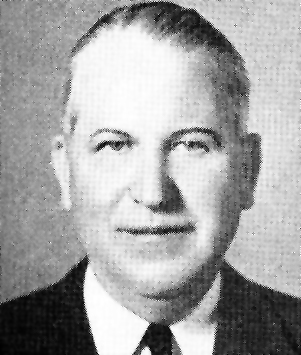

Member of the U.S. House of Representatives from Texas's 16th district
- In office August 23, 1947 – January 3, 1955
- Preceded by: Robert Ewing Thomason
- Succeeded by: JT Rutherford

Personal details
- Born: Kenneth Mills Regan; March 6, 1891 Mount Morris, Illinois, U.S.
- Died: August 15, 1959 (aged 68) Santa Fe, New Mexico, U.S.
- Resting place: Resthaven Memorial Park, Midland, Texas
- Party: Democratic

Military service
- Allegiance: United States
- Branch/service: United States Army
- Rank: Captain
- Battles/wars: World War I

Kenneth Mills Regan (March 6, 1888 – August 15, 1959) was an American businessman, World War I veteran, and politician who served four terms as a U.S. representative from Texas from 1947 to 1955.

== Early life and career ==
Born in Mount Morris, Illinois, Regan attended the public schools and Vincennes (Indiana) University. Regan served as a flyer in the United States Army Signal Corps during World War I.

In 1920, Regan was involved in the real estate business and as an oil operator in Pecos, Texas. He served on the Pecos City Council and as mayor of Pecos 1929-1932. He served in the Texas Senate from 1933 to 1937.

=== World War I ===
During World War I, he served as an intelligence officer in the Air Corps and was discharged with the rank of captain.

After the war, he moved to Texas, living in Pecos, Midland, and Houston, being active in real estate, oil, cantaloupe growing, and cattle ranching.

== Political career ==
Regan was elected as a Democrat to the Eightieth Congress to fill the vacancy caused by the resignation of Robert Ewing Thomason. The special election in 1947 consisted of seven Democrats, with Regan taking 43% and the victory. The runner-up with 38% challenged Regan again for the Democratic nomination in 1948 but fell short by twenty points. He was reelected to the Eighty-first, Eighty-second, and Eighty-third Congresses, and served from August 23, 1947, to January 3, 1955. Regan was an unsuccessful candidate for renomination in 1954 to the Eighty-fourth Congress. His opponent alleged that Regan was just a part-time representative, and a newspaper columnist attributed it to Regan's supposed support for Republican Dwight Eisenwower in the 1952 presidential election.

Regan was indeed a rather inactive representative, though he was the sponsor of six successful public bills, five of which were specific to his congressional district.

== Later career and death ==
Regan later served as the representative of Texas railroads in Washington, D.C.

He died in Santa Fe, New Mexico, on August 15, 1959. He was interred in Resthaven Memorial Park, Midland, Texas.

== Sources ==
- United States Congress. "Kenneth M. Regan (id: R000140)". Biographical Directory of the United States Congress.

U.S. House of Representatives
Preceded by R. Ewing Thomason	Member of the U.S. House of Representatives from Texas's 16th congressional district August 23, 1947 – January 3, 1955	Succeeded by J. T. Rutherford
