= E. S. Johnny Walker =

American politician

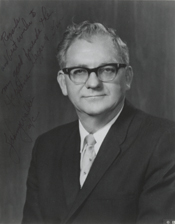

Member of the U.S. House of Representatives from New Mexico's at-large district
- In office January 3, 1965 – January 3, 1969
- Preceded by: Joseph Montoya
- Succeeded by: Ed Foreman (redistricting)

14th and 16th New Mexico Commissioner of Public Lands
- In office January 1, 1961 – January 1, 1965
- Governor: Edwin L. Mechem; Tom Bolack
- Preceded by: Murray E. Morgan
- Succeeded by: Guyton B. Hays
- In office January 1, 1953 – January 1, 1957
- Governor: Edwin L. Mechem; John F. Simms
- Preceded by: Guy Shepard
- Succeeded by: Murray E. Morgan

Member of the New Mexico House of Representatives
- In office 1948–1952

Personal details
- Born: June 18, 1911 Fulton, Kentucky, U.S.
- Died: October 8, 2000 (aged 89) Albuquerque, New Mexico, U.S.
- Party: Democratic
- Education: University of New Mexico; George Washington University

Military service
- Allegiance: United States
- Branch/service: United States Army
- Years of service: 1942–1945
- Battles/wars: World War II

E. S. Johnny Walker (June 18, 1911 – October 8, 2000) was an American World War II veteran and politician who served two terms in the United States House of Representatives from 1965 to 1969.

== Early life and education ==
Walker was born in Fulton, Kentucky, and attended public schools there until his family moved to Albuquerque, New Mexico in 1926. He graduated from Albuquerque High School and attended the University of New Mexico and George Washington University.

=== World War II ===
In 1942, he enlisted in the United States Army and served during the Second World War in the North African and European Theaters of operation until the end of the war. He was discharged in 1945.

== Career ==
Walker was elected to the New Mexico House of Representatives in 1948. Walker also served as majority whip. His most notable accomplishment in the State Legislature was sponsoring legislation to allow women to serve on juries.

In 1952, he was elected as New Mexico's New Mexico commissioner of public lands, served two consecutive two-year terms in that office, and then was made commissioner of the New Mexico Bureau of Revenue. In 1960, he was elected commissioner of public lands for two more consecutive two-year terms.

=== Congress ===
In 1964, he was elected to the United States House of Representatives by the state's voters to the seat previously held by Joseph Montoya, who successfully ran for the Senate that year. He served two terms in Congress, during which he was a member on the United States House Committee on Armed Services. He sponsored legislation that created Pecos National Monument.

=== Defeat and post-Congress ===
In 1968, New Mexico drew congressional districts for the first time, and its two representatives were no longer elected at large. Walker's home was placed in New Mexico's 2nd congressional district, which included most of the southern half of the state as well as a small portion of Albuquerque. Walker had lost a lot of goodwill in this part of the state because of his support of gun control and the Pentagon's closure of Walker Air Force Base near Roswell which Walker adamantly opposed. Ed Foreman, a former congressman from Texas, ran the most expensive campaign seen in New Mexico history to that point, and defeated Walker in November 1968 by a mere half point margin.

Walker remained minimally involved in state politics, but did not seek elected office.

== Personal life ==
Walker died of leukemia in Albuquerque at the age of 89. Senator Jeff Bingaman honored his memory on the Senate floor.

U.S. House of Representatives
Preceded by Joseph Montoya	Member of the U.S. House of Representatives from New Mexico's at-large congressional district 1965–1969	Succeeded by Ed Foreman
