= Harmon T. Ogdahl =

American politician

Harmon Theodore Ogdahl, Sr.
- Born: November 18, 1917; Minneapolis, Minnesota, U.S.
- Died: November 8, 2009 (aged 91); Minneapolis, Minnesota, U.S.
- Education: Hamline University, University of Minnesota
- Occupations: Businessman, Politician
- Known for: Service in the Minnesota Senate and Minneapolis City Council

Harmon Theodore Ogdahl, Sr. (November 18, 1917 – November 8, 2009) was an American businessman and politician.

Ogdahl was born in Minneapolis, Minnesota and graduated from Washburn High School in Minneapolis. He went to Hamline University and the University of Minnesota. Ogdahl served in the United States Army during World War II and was stationed in the Pacific. Ogdahl lived with his wife and family in Minneapolis. He was involved with the real estate, banking, and insurance businesses. Ogdahl served on the Minneapolis City Council and was a Republican. he served in the Minnesota Senate from 1963 to 1980. In 1968 he ran for election to the United States House of Representatives and lost the election. He died in Minneapolis, Minnesota.
