= Ed Foreman =

American politician (1933–2022)

Edgar Franklin Foreman Jr.
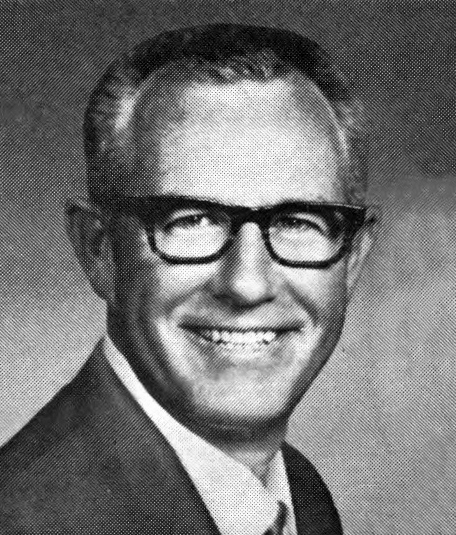
- Official portrait, 1969

Member of the U.S. House of Representatives
- In office January 3, 1969 – January 3, 1971
- Preceded by: E. S. Johnny Walker (redistricting)
- Succeeded by: Harold L. Runnels
- Constituency: New Mexico 2nd
- In office January 3, 1963 – January 3, 1965
- Preceded by: J. T. Rutherford
- Succeeded by: Richard Crawford White
- Constituency: Texas 16th

Personal details
- Born: December 22, 1933 Portales, New Mexico, U.S.
- Died: February 2, 2022 (aged 88)
- Party: Republican
- Spouse: Barbara Lynn Southard Foreman (m. 1955)
- Children: Preston Kirk Foreman; Rebecca Lynn Foreman
- Education: Eastern New Mexico University; New Mexico State University (BS)
- Occupation: Civil engineer businessman motivational speaker Dallas, Texas

Military service
- Allegiance: United States
- Branch/service: United States Navy
- Years of service: 1956–1957

Edgar Franklin Foreman Jr. (December 22, 1933 – February 2, 2022) was an American businessman and politician who was a member of the United States House of Representatives. He served one term representing Texas's 16th congressional district from 1963 to 1965 and a second term from 1969 to 1971 representing New Mexico's 2nd district, then newly established. He is the most historically recent member of Congress to have represented more than one state during their career.

== Early life and education ==
Foreman was born on a peanut farm in Portales, New Mexico, in Roosevelt County in southeastern New Mexico, to Edgar Foreman Sr. and the former Lillian Childress.

From 1952 to 1953, he attended Eastern New Mexico College in Portales. He transferred to New Mexico State University in Las Cruces, where in 1955 he obtained a Bachelor of Science degree in civil engineering.

From 1953 to 1956, Foreman was employed by Phillips Petroleum Company. From 1956 to 1957, he served in the United States Navy as an enlisted sailor. He also served in the United States Navy Reserve and United States Air Force Reserve. While in the Air Force Reserve, he became a captain in the 9999th Air Reserve Squadron in Washington, DC while serving as a congressman. He headed Foreman Brine Sales and Service in Odessa, Texas, from 1956 to 1962. He was formerly the president of Valley Transit Mix, Atlas Land Company, and Foreman Oil, Inc.

== Political career ==
=== Represented West Texas, 1963–1965 ===
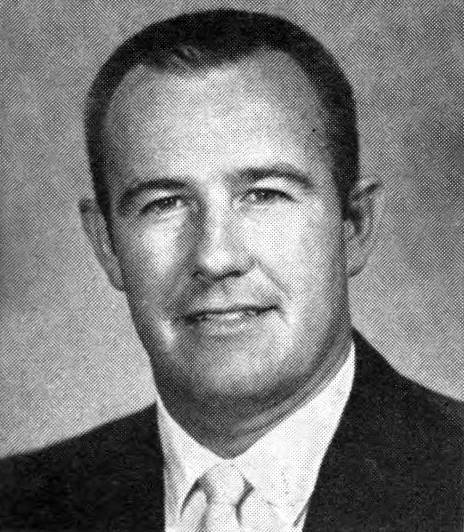
Foreman as a Congressman from Texas, 1963.

In 1962 Foreman was elected to Congress from the 16th District in West Texas, which stretched from El Paso to the Permian Basin. In that same election, the Democrat, later Republican, John Connally, was elected governor over the Republican oilfield equipment executive Jack Cox.

Foreman voted against the Civil Rights Act of 1964. Foreman was defeated for re-election in 1964, a year in which President Lyndon B. Johnson, a Texan, was reelected over Republican U.S. Senator Barry M. Goldwater in a landslide, and the Republicans suffered massive losses throughout the nation.

=== Represented southern New Mexico, 1969–1971 ===
Following his defeat, he relocated to New Mexico, where he became active in business and civic affairs in Las Cruces. In 1968 while residing in Las Cruces, Foreman ran for Congress in the southern district of New Mexico and upset the two-term Democrat E. S. "Johnny" Walker of Albuquerque. Foreman was unseated after a single term in 1970 by Democrat Harold Runnels.

=== Appointment to two federal jobs ===
After losing a House seat for the second time in six years, Foreman in 1971 was appointed Assistant Secretary of the Interior in the Nixon administration, and the following year, 1972, he was appointed to a position at the United States Department of Transportation, where he stayed until 1976.

== Personal life and death ==
Foreman died on February 2, 2022, at the age of 88.

U.S. House of Representatives
Preceded by J. T. Rutherford	U.S. Representative from Texas's 16th congressional district 1963–1965	Succeeded by Richard C. White
Preceded by At-large: E. S. "Johnny" Walker; Thomas G. Morris	U.S. Representative from New Mexico's 2nd congressional district 1969–1971	Succeeded by Harold Runnels
