= List of members of the United States Congress from multiple states =

Throughout the history of the United States Congress, some members were elected either as representatives and/or senators from more than one U.S. state at different times in their career.

== Multiple states in the House ==
Name	State (District)	Start	End	Party
Daniel Hiester	Pennsylvania (at-large/5th districts)	1789	1795	Anti-Administration
Daniel Hiester	Pennsylvania (at-large/5th districts)	1795	1796	Democratic-Republican
Daniel Hiester	Maryland (4th district)	1801	1804	Democratic-Republican
John Sevier	North Carolina (5th district)	1790	1791	Pro-Administration
John Sevier	Tennessee (2nd district)	1811	1815	Democratic-Republican
Anthony New	Virginia (16th/11th district)	1793	1795	Anti-Administration
Anthony New	Virginia (16th/11th district)	1795	1805	Democratic-Republican
Anthony New	Kentucky (1st district)	1811	1813	Democratic-Republican
Anthony New	Kentucky (5th district)	1817	1819	Democratic-Republican
Anthony New	Kentucky (5th district)	1821	1823	Democratic-Republican
Edward Livingston	New York (2nd district)	1795	1801	Democratic-Republican
Edward Livingston	Louisiana (1st district)	1823	1825	Democratic-Republican
Edward Livingston	Louisiana (1st district)	1825	1829	Jacksonian
Matthew Lyon	Vermont (1st district)	1797	1801	Democratic-Republican
Matthew Lyon	Kentucky (1st district)	1803	1811	Democratic-Republican
Ezekiel Whitman	Massachusetts (15th district)	1809	1811	Federalist
Ezekiel Whitman	Massachusetts (15th district)	1817	1821	Federalist
Ezekiel Whitman	Maine (2nd district)	1821	1822	Federalist
Daniel Webster	New Hampshire (at-large)	1813	1817	Federalist
Daniel Webster	Massachusetts (1st district)	1823	1825	Federalist
Daniel Webster	Massachusetts (1st district)	1825	1827	National Republican
Enoch Lincoln	Massachusetts (20th district)	1818	1821	Democratic-Republican
Enoch Lincoln	Maine (7th/5th districts)	1821	1826	Democratic-Republican
Joshua Cushman	Massachusetts (19th district)	1819	1821	Democratic-Republican
Joshua Cushman	Maine (6th/4th districts)	1821	1825	Democratic-Republican
Mark Hill	Massachusetts (16th district)	1819	1821	Democratic-Republican
Mark Hill	Maine (3rd district)	1821	1823	Democratic-Republican
Samuel Clark	New York (25th district)	1833	1835	Jacksonian
Samuel Clark	Michigan (3rd district)	1853	1855	Democratic
William Brown	Virginia (15th district)	1845	1849	Democratic
William Brown	Virginia (10th district)	1861	1863	Union
William Brown	West Virginia (2nd district)	1863	1865	Union
Charles Faulkner	Virginia (10th/8th districts)	1851	1859	Democratic
Charles Faulkner	West Virginia (2nd district)	1875	1877	Democratic
Samuel Cox	Ohio (12th/7th districts)	1857	1865	Democratic
Samuel Cox	New York (6th/8th district)	1869	1885	Democratic
Samuel Cox	New York (9th district)	1886	1889	Democratic
Francis Kellogg	Michigan (3rd/4th districts)	1859	1865	Republican
Francis Kellogg	Alabama (1st district)	1868	1869	Republican
William Vandever	Iowa (2nd district)	1859	1863	Republican
William Vandever	California (6th district)	1887	1891	Republican
Jacob B. Blair	Virginia (11th district)	1861	1863	Union
Jacob B. Blair	West Virginia (1st district)	1863	1865	Union
Kellian Whaley	Virginia (12th district)	1861	1863	Union
Kellian Whaley	West Virginia (2nd district)	1863	1867	Union
Charles A. Towne	Minnesota (6th district)	1895	1897	Republican
Charles A. Towne	New York (14th district)	1905	1907	Democratic
Robert P. Hill	Illinois (25th district)	1913	1915	Democratic
Robert P. Hill	Oklahoma (5th district)	1937	1937	Democratic
Ed Foreman	Texas (16th district)	1963	1965	Republican
Ed Foreman	New Mexico (2nd district)	1969	1971	Republican

== Multiple states in the Senate ==
Only two senators have represented more than one state.

- James Shields uniquely served terms in the U.S. Senate for three states; representing Illinois (1849–1855), Minnesota (1858–1859), and Missouri (1879). He was a Democrat.
- Waitman T. Willey was a Restored Government of Virginia Senator (1861–1863) who helped create West Virginia. He was then appointed as one of the new state's first two senators (1863–1871). He was a Unionist until 1865 and a Republican thereafter.

== One state in the House, another in the Senate ==
Name	Offices	Start	End	Party
John Brown	Representative from Virginia (2nd district)	1789	1792	Democratic-Republican
John Brown	Senator from Kentucky	1792	1805	Democratic-Republican
Robert Harper	Representative from South Carolina (5th district)	1795	1801	Federalist
Robert Harper	Senator from Maryland	1816	1816	Federalist
Edward Livingston	(New York (state)) Representative from New York (2nd district)	1795	1801	Democratic-Republican
Edward Livingston	Senator from Louisiana	1829	1831	Jacksonian
William Claiborne	Representative from Tennessee (at-large)	1797	1801	Democratic-Republican
William Claiborne	Senator from Louisiana	1817	1817	Democratic-Republican
David Holmes	Representative from Virginia (2nd/4th districts)	1797	1809	Democratic-Republican
David Holmes	Senator from Mississippi	1820	1825	Democratic-Republican
John Chandler	Representative from Massachusetts (17th district)	1805	1809	Democratic-Republican
John Chandler	Senator from Maine	1820	1829	Democratic-Republican
William R. King	Representative from North Carolina (5th district)	1811	1816	Democratic-Republican
William R. King	Senator from Alabama	1819	1844	Democratic-Republican
William R. King	Senator from Alabama	1819	1844	Democratic
William R. King	Senator from Alabama	1848	1852	Democratic
Israel Pickens	Representative from North Carolina (11th/12th districts)	1811	1817	Democratic-Republican
Israel Pickens	Senator from Alabama	1826	1826	Jacksonian
Daniel Webster	Representative from New Hampshire (at-large)	1813	1817	Federalist
Daniel Webster	Senator from Massachusetts	1827	1833	National Republican
Daniel Webster	Senator from Massachusetts	1833	1841	Whig
Daniel Webster	Senator from Massachusetts	1845	1850	Whig
Albion Parris	Representative from Massachusetts (20th district)	1815	1818	Democratic-Republican
Albion Parris	Senator from Maine	1827	1828	Jacksonian
John Holmes	Representative from Massachusetts (14th district)	1817	1820	Democratic-Republican
John Holmes	Senator from Maine	1820	1827	Democratic-Republican
John Holmes	Senator from Maine	1829	1833	National Republican
Sam Houston	Representative from Tennessee (7th)	1823	1827	Democratic-Republican
Sam Houston	Senator from Texas	1846	1859	Democratic
Jesse Speight	Representative from North Carolina (4th district)	1829	1837	Jacksonian
Jesse Speight	Senator from Mississippi	1845	1847	Democratic
John B. Weller	Representative from Ohio (2nd district)	1839	1845	Democratic
John B. Weller	Senator from California	1852	1857	Democratic
William Gwin	Representative from Mississippi (at-large)	1841	1843	Democratic
William Gwin	Senator from California	1850	1855	Democratic
William Gwin	Senator from California	1857	1861	Democratic
Alexander Ramsey	Representative from Pennsylvania (15th district)	1843	1847	Whig
Alexander Ramsey	Senator from Minnesota	1863	1875	Republican
Edward Baker	Representative from Illinois (7th district)	1845	1847	Whig
Edward Baker	Representative from Illinois (6th district)	1849	1851	Whig
Edward Baker	Senator from Oregon	1860	1861	Republican
James Lane	Representative from Indiana (4th district)	1853	1855	Democratic
James Lane	Senator from Kansas	1861	1866	Republican
Charles Van Wyck	(New York (state)) Representative from New York (10th district)	1859	1863	Republican
Charles Van Wyck	(New York (state)) Representative from New York (11th district)	1867	1869	Republican
Charles Van Wyck	(New York (state)) Representative from New York (11th district)	1870	1871	Republican
Charles Van Wyck	Senator from Nebraska	1881	1887	Republican
J. Hamilton Lewis	(Washington (state)) Representative from Washington (at-large district)	1897	1899	Democratic
J. Hamilton Lewis	Senator from Illinois	1913	1919	Democratic
J. Hamilton Lewis	Senator from Illinois	1933	1939	Democratic
Charles A. Towne	Senator from Minnesota	1900	1901	Democratic
Charles A. Towne	(New York (state)) Representative from New York (14th district)	1905	1907	Democratic

== Territories and states ==
- William Henry Harrison – the future president of the United States was a delegate to the 6th United States Congress from Northwest Territory (1799–1800), resigning to become territorial Governor of Indiana. He returned to Congress first as a representative from Ohio's 1st congressional district (1816–19), and then serving an incomplete term as senator for Ohio (1825–28), resigning to become U.S. Minister Plenipotentiary to Gran Colombia. He was a Whig.
- James M. Cavanaugh – represented Minnesota (1858–59) as a representative and then Montana Territory (1867–71) as a delegate. He was a Democrat.
- Stephen Benton Elkins – represented New Mexico Territory (1873–77) as a delegate and later West Virginia (1895–1911) as a senator. He was a Republican.
- John Noble Goodwin – represented Maine as a representative (1861–63) and later Arizona Territory as a delegate (1866–76). He was also first governor of the Territory of Arizona. He was a Republican.
- George Wallace Jones – was a delegate from Michigan Territory (1835–37) until Michigan was created as a State. He continued representing the remaining renamed Wisconsin Territory as a delegate (1837–39). Later, after Iowa was carved from the Wisconsin Territory and subsequently admitted to the union, he became one of the first senators from Iowa (1848–59). He was a Democrat.
- Richard Cunningham McCormick – represented Arizona Territory (1869–75) and later New York as a representative (1895–97). He was a Unionist as a delegate and a Republican as a representative.
- Henry Hastings Sibley – represented Wisconsin Territory (1848–49) and later Minnesota Territory as a delegate (1849–53). He was a Democrat.
- Jesse B. Thomas – represented Indiana Territory (1808–09) as a delegate and later Illinois (1818–1829) as a senator. He was initially a Democratic-Republican, but became an Anti-Jacksonian while senator.
- William H. Wallace – represented Washington Territory (1861–63) and later Idaho Territory as a delegate (1864–65). He was a Republican.
