= Frank Owen III =

American politician

Frank Owen III (February 25, 1926 – February 20, 1999) was a Texas legislator.

Born in El Paso, Texas, Owen served in the Texas House of Representatives from 1951 to 1955 and in the Texas State Senate from 1955 to 1965.
