= List of new members of the 94th United States Congress =

The 94th United States Congress began on January 3, 1975. There were five new senators (all Democrats) and 92 new representatives (75 Democrats, 17 Republicans) at the start of the first session. Additionally, nine senators (five Democrats, four Republicans) and nine representatives (six Democrats, three Republicans) took office on various dates in order to fill vacancies during the 94th Congress before it ended on January 3, 1977.

Due to redistricting in California, one representative was elected from a newly established congressional district.

== Senate ==
=== Took office January 3, 1975 ===
State	Image	Senator	Seniority	Switched party	Prior background	Birth year	Ref
Arkansas		Dale Bumpers (D)	2nd (97th overall)	No; Defeated J. William Fulbright (D) in a primary	Governor of Arkansas; U.S. Marine Corps	1925	
Colorado		Gary Hart (D)	4th (99th overall)	Yes; Defeated Peter H. Dominick (R)	Attorney	1936	
Iowa		John Culver (D)	1st (96th overall)	No; Open seat; replaced Harold Hughes (D)	U.S. House of Representatives (Note: Elected to the 89th Congress, serving from 1965 to 1975 in Iowa's 2nd district.); U.S. Marine Corps Captain	1932	
North Carolina		Robert Burren Morgan (D)	3rd (98th overall)	No; Open seat; replaced Sam Ervin (D)	North Carolina Attorney General; North Carolina Senate; U.S. Navy Lieutenant Commander	1925	
Vermont		Patrick Leahy (D)	5th (100th overall)	Yes; Open seat; replaced George Aiken (R)	Chittenden County State's Attorney	1940	

=== Took office during the 94th Congress ===
State	Image	Senator	Took office	Switched party	Prior background	Birth year	Ref
New Hampshire		Norris Cotton (R)	August 8, 1975	No; Appointed; replaced Louis C. Wyman (R)	U.S. Senate (Note: Previously elected to the 83rd Congress, serving from 1954 to 1974.); U.S. House of Representatives (Note: Elected to the 80th Congress, serving from 1947 to 1954 in New Hampshire's 2nd district.); Speaker of the New Hampshire House of Representatives	1900	
New Hampshire		John A. Durkin (D)	September 18, 1975	Yes; Open seat; replaced Norris Cotton (R)	New Hampshire Insurance Commissioner; U.S. Navy Lieutenant	1936	
Missouri		John Danforth (R)	December 27, 1976	Yes; Open seat; replaced Stuart Symington (D)	Missouri Attorney General	1936	
Nebraska		Edward Zorinsky (D)	December 28, 1976	Yes; Open seat; replaced Roman Hruska (R)	Mayor of Omaha; Omaha Public Power District; U.S. Army Reserve	1928	
Ohio		Howard Metzenbaum (D)	December 29, 1976	Yes; Defeated Robert Taft Jr. (R)	U.S. Senate (Note: Previously appointed to the 93rd Congress, serving from January to December 1974.); Ohio Senate; Ohio House of Representatives	1917	
Rhode Island		John Chafee (R)	December 29, 1976	Yes; Open seat; replaced John Pastore (D)	U.S. Secretary of the Navy; Governor of Rhode Island; Rhode Island House of Representatives; U.S. Marine Corps Captain	1922	
Michigan		Donald Riegle (D)	December 30, 1976	No; Open seat; replaced Philip Hart (D)	U.S. House of Representatives (Note: Elected to the 90th Congress, serving from 1967 to 1976 in Michigan's 7th district.)	1938	
Minnesota		Wendell R. Anderson (DFL)	December 30, 1976	No; Appointed; replaced Walter Mondale (DFL)	Governor of Minnesota; Minnesota Senate; Minnesota House of Representatives; Olympic ice hockey player U.S. Army	1933	
California		S. I. Hayakawa (R)	January 2, 1977	Yes; Defeated John V. Tunney (D)	President of San Francisco State University	1906	

== House of Representatives ==
=== Took office January 3, 1975 ===
District	Representative	Switched party	Prior background	Birth year	Ref
California 7	George Miller (D)	No	Legislative aide	1945	
California 13	Norman Mineta (D)	Yes	Mayor of San Jose	1931	
California 17	John Hans Krebs (D)	Yes	County Supervisor	1926	
California 24	Henry Waxman (D)	New seat	State Assemblyman	1939	
California 34	Mark W. Hannaford (D)	Yes	Mayor of Lakewood	1925	
California 35	James F. Lloyd (D)	Yes	Mayor of West Covina	1922	
California 38	Jerry M. Patterson (D)	No	Mayor of Santa Ana	1934	
Colorado 2	Tim Wirth (D)	Yes	U.S. DOE official	1939	
Connecticut 2	Chris Dodd (D)	Yes	Lawyer	1944	
Connecticut 6	Toby Moffett (D)	No	CCAG Director	1944	
Florida 5	Richard Kelly (R)	Yes	Circuit Court Judge	1924	
Georgia 4	Elliott H. Levitas (D)	Yes	State Representative	1930	
Georgia 7	Larry McDonald (D)	No	Flight surgeon	1935	
Idaho 2	George V. Hansen (R)	No	U.S. Representative (Note: Previously elected to the 89th Congress, serving from 1965 to 1969.)	1930	
Illinois 3	Marty Russo (D)	Yes	Professional advocate	1944	
Illinois 6	Henry Hyde (R)	No	State Representative	1924	
Illinois 10	Abner Mikva (D)	Yes	U.S. Representative (Note: Previously elected to the 91st Congress, serving from 1969 to 1973 in the 2nd district.)	1926	
Illinois 15	Tim Lee Hall (D)	Yes	Educator	1925	
Illinois 24	Paul Simon (D)	No	Lieutenant Governor of Illinois	1928	
Indiana 2	Floyd Fithian (D)	Yes	Educator	1928	
Indiana 6	David W. Evans (D)	Yes	Educator	1946	
Indiana 8	Philip H. Hayes (D)	Yes	State Senator	1940	
Indiana 10	Philip Sharp (D)	Yes	Professor	1942	
Indiana 11	Andrew Jacobs Jr. (D)	Yes	U.S. Representative (Note: Previously elected to the 89th Congress, serving from 1965 to 1973.)	1932	
Iowa 2	Mike Blouin (D)	No	State Senator	1945	
Iowa 3	Chuck Grassley (R)	No	State Representative	1933	
Iowa 5	Tom Harkin (D)	Yes	Congressional aide	1939	
Iowa 6	Berkley Bedell (D)	Yes	Business owner	1921	
Kansas 2	Martha Keys (D)	No	Campaign manager	1930	
Kentucky 1	Carroll Hubbard (D)	No	State Senator	1937	
Louisiana 6	Henson Moore (R)	Yes	State Party official	1939	
Maine 1	David F. Emery (R)	Yes	State Representative	1948	
Maryland 5	Gladys Spellman (D)	Yes	County Commissioner	1918	
Massachusetts 3	Joseph D. Early (D)	No	State Representative	1933	
Massachusetts 5	Paul Tsongas (D)	Yes	City Councillor	1941	
Michigan 6	Milton Robert Carr (D)	Yes	Lawyer	1943	
Michigan 17	William M. Brodhead (D)	No	State Representative	1941	
Michigan 18	James J. Blanchard (D)	Yes	Legal advisor	1942	
Minnesota 2	Tom Hagedorn (R)	No	State Representative	1943	
Minnesota 6	Rick Nolan (DFL)	Yes	State Representative	1943	
Minnesota 8	Jim Oberstar (DFL)	No	Congressional staffer	1934	
Montana 1	Max Baucus (D)	Yes	State Representative	1941	
Nebraska 3	Virginia Smith (R)	No	Executive advisor	1911	
Nevada at-large	James David Santini (D)	Yes	District Court Judge	1937	
New Hampshire 1	Norman D'Amours (D)	Yes	City Prosecutor	1937	
New Jersey 1	James Florio (D)	Yes	State Assemblyman	1937	
New Jersey 2	William J. Hughes (D)	Yes	Ethics advisor	1932	
New Jersey 5	Millicent Fenwick (R)	No	State Assemblywoman	1910	
New Jersey 7	Andrew Maguire (D)	Yes	U.S. DOS official	1939	
New Jersey 13	Helen Stevenson Meyner (D)	Yes	First Lady of New Jersey	1929	
New York 2	Thomas Downey (D)	Yes	County Legislator	1949	
New York 3	Jerome Ambro (D)	Yes	Town Supervisor	1928	
New York 11	James H. Scheuer (D)	No	U.S. Representative (Note: Previously elected to the 89th Congress, serving from 1965 to 1973 in the 21st district.)	1920	
New York 13	Stephen Solarz (D)	No	State Assemblyman	1940	
New York 14	Fred Richmond (D)	No	City Councillor	1923	
New York 15	Leo C. Zeferetti (D)	No	Corrections Officer	1927	
New York 24	Richard Ottinger (D)	No	U.S. Representative (Note: Previously elected to the 89th Congress, serving from 1965 to 1971 in the 25th district.)	1929	
New York 27	Matthew F. McHugh (D)	Yes	District Attorney	1938	
New York 29	Edward W. Pattison (D)	Yes	County Treasurer	1932	
New York 36	John LaFalce (D)	Yes	State Assemblyman	1939	
New York 37	Henry J. Nowak (D)	No	County Comptroller	1935	
North Carolina 5	Stephen L. Neal (D)	Yes	Banker	1934	
North Carolina 8	Bill Hefner (D)	Yes	Entertainer	1930	
Ohio 1	Bill Gradison (R)	Yes	Mayor of Cincinnati	1928	
Ohio 8	Tom Kindness (R)	No	State Representative	1929	
Ohio 23	Ronald M. Mottl (R)	Yes	State Senator	1934	
Oklahoma 2	Ted Risenhoover (D)	No	Newspaper publisher	1934	
Oklahoma 6	Glenn English (D)	Yes	State Party Director	1940	
Oregon 1	Les AuCoin (D)	Yes	State Representative	1942	
Oregon 3	Robert B. Duncan (D)	No	U.S. Representative (Note: Previously elected to the 88th Congress, serving from 1963 to 1967 in the 4th district.)	1920	
Oregon 4	Jim Weaver (D)	Yes	Real estate developer	1927	
Pennsylvania 5	Richard T. Schulze (R)	No	State Representative	1929	
Pennsylvania 7	Robert W. Edgar (D)	Yes	Chaplain	1943	
Pennsylvania 19	Bill Goodling (R)	No	Educator	1927	
Pennsylvania 25	Gary A. Myers (R)	Yes	Industrial engineer	1937	
Rhode Island 2	Edward Beard (D)	No	State Representative	1940	
South Carolina 3	Butler Derrick (D)	No	State Representative	1936	
South Carolina 5	Kenneth Lamar Holland (D)	No	Attorney	1934	
South Carolina 6	John Jenrette (D)	Yes	State Representative	1936	
South Dakota 1	Larry Pressler (R)	Yes	U.S. Foreign Service officer	1942	
Tennessee 3	Marilyn Lloyd (D)	Yes	Businesswoman	1929	
Tennessee 8	Harold Ford Sr. (D)	Yes	State Representative	1945	
Texas 13	Jack Hightower (D)	Yes	State Senator	1926	
Texas 21	Bob Krueger (D)	No	Academic administrator	1935	
Utah 2	Allan Turner Howe (D)	No	Attorney	1927	
Vermont at-large	Jim Jeffords (R)	No	Vermont Attorney General	1934	
Virginia 8	Herbert Harris (D)	Yes	County Supervisor	1926	
Virginia 10	Joseph L. Fisher (D)	Yes	RFF President	1914	
Washington 3	Don Bonker (D)	No	County Auditor	1937	
Wisconsin 3	Alvin Baldus (D)	Yes	State Assemblyman	1926	
Wisconsin 8	Robert John Cornell (D)	Yes	Priest	1919	
Wisconsin 9	Bob Kasten (R)	No	State Senator	1942	

=== Took office during the 94th Congress ===
District	Representative	Took office	Switched party	Prior background	Birth year	Ref
California 37	Shirley Neil Pettis (R)	April 29, 1975	No	Columnist	1924	
Illinois 5	John G. Fary (D)	July 8, 1975	No	State Representative	1911	
Tennessee 5	Clifford Allen (D)	November 25, 1975	No	County Tax Assessor	1912	
New York 39	Stan Lundine (D)	March 2, 1976	Yes	Mayor of Jamestown	1939	
Texas 22	Ron Paul (R)	April 3, 1976	Yes	Obstetrician-gynecologist	1935	
Texas 1	Sam B. Hall Jr. (D)	June 19, 1976	No	Lawyer	1924	
Massachusetts 7	Ed Markey (D)	November 2, 1976	No	State Representative	1946	
Missouri 6	Tom Coleman (R)	November 2, 1976	Yes	State Representative	1943	
Pennsylvania 1	Michael Myers (D)	November 2, 1976	No	State Representative	1943	

== See also ==
- List of United States representatives in the 94th Congress
- List of United States senators in the 94th Congress
- Watergate Babies

== Notes ==
Preceded by New members of the 93rd Congress	New members of the 94th Congress; 1975–1977	Succeeded by New members of the 95th Congress
