= List of United States representatives in the 92nd Congress =

This is a complete list of United States representatives during the 92nd United States Congress listed by seniority.

As an historical article, the districts and party affiliations listed reflect those during the 92nd Congress (January 3, 1971 – January 3, 1973). Seats and party affiliations on similar lists for other congresses will be different for certain members.

Seniority depends on the date on which members were sworn into office. Since many members are sworn in on the same day, subsequent ranking is based on previous congressional service of the individual and then by alphabetical order by the last name of the representative.

Committee chairmanship in the House is often associated with seniority. However, party leadership is typically not associated with seniority.

Note: The "*" indicates that the representative/delegate may have served one or more non-consecutive terms while in the House of Representatives of the United States Congress.

== U.S. House seniority list ==
U.S. House seniority
Rank	Representative	Party	District	Seniority date (Previous service, if any)	No.# of term(s)	Notes
1	Emanuel Celler	D	NY-10	March 4, 1923	25th term	Dean of the House; Left the House in 1973.
2	Wright Patman	D	TX-01	March 4, 1929	22nd term	
3	William M. Colmer	D	MS-05	March 4, 1933	20th term	Left the House in 1973.
4	Leslie C. Arends	R	IL-17	January 3, 1935	19th term	
5	George H. Mahon	D	TX-19	January 3, 1935	19th term	
6	William R. Poage	D	TX-11	January 3, 1937	18th term	
7	John L. McMillan	D	SC-06	January 3, 1939	17th term	Left the House in 1973.
8	Wilbur Mills	D	AR-02	January 3, 1939	17th term	
9	Felix Edward Hébert	D	LA-01	January 3, 1941	16th term	
10	Jamie Whitten	D	MS-02	November 4, 1941	16th term	
11	Thomas Abernethy	D	MS-01	January 3, 1943	15th term	Left the House in 1973.
12	O. C. Fisher	D	TX-21	January 3, 1943	15th term	
13	Chester E. Holifield	D	CA-19	January 3, 1943	15th term	
14	Alvin O'Konski	R	WI-10	January 3, 1943	15th term	Left the House in 1973.
15	Ray Madden	D	IN-01	January 3, 1943	15th term	
16	George W. Andrews	D	AL-03	March 14, 1944	15th term	Died on December 25, 1971.
17	John J. Rooney	D	NY-14	June 6, 1944	15th term	
18	John W. Byrnes	R	WI-08	January 3, 1945	14th term	Left the House in 1973.
19	Robert J. Corbett	R	PA-18	January 3, 1945; Previous service, 1939–1941.	15th term*	Died on April 25, 1971.
20	James G. Fulton	R	PA-27	January 3, 1945	14th term	Died on October 6, 1971.
21	George Paul Miller	D	CA-08	January 3, 1945	14th term	Left the House in 1973.
22	Thomas E. Morgan	D	PA-26	January 3, 1945	14th term	
23	Charles Melvin Price	D	IL-24	January 3, 1945	14th term	
24	Robert L. F. Sikes	D	FL-01	January 3, 1945; Previous service, 1941–1944.	16th term*	
25	Olin E. Teague	D	TX-06	August 24, 1946	14th term	
26	Carl Albert	D	OK-03	January 3, 1947	13th term	Speaker of the House
27	John Blatnik	D	MN-08	January 3, 1947	13th term	
28	Hale Boggs	D	LA-02	January 3, 1947; Previous service, 1941–1943.	14th term*	Presumed to have been killed in a plane crash October 16, 1972 but not declared dead until January 3, 1973.
29	Omar Burleson	D	TX-17	January 3, 1947	13th term	
30	Harold Donohue	D	MA-04	January 3, 1947	13th term	
31	Joe L. Evins	D	TN-04	January 3, 1947	13th term	
32	Otto Passman	D	LA-05	January 3, 1947	13th term	
33	Robert E. Jones, Jr.	D	AL-08	January 28, 1947	13th term	
34	Edward Garmatz	D	MD-03	July 15, 1947	13th term	Left the House in 1973.
35	William Moore McCulloch	R	OH-04	November 4, 1947	13th term	Left the House in 1973.
36	Watkins Moorman Abbitt	D	VA-04	February 17, 1948	13th term	Left the House in 1973.
37	Wayne N. Aspinall	D	CO-04	January 3, 1949	12th term	Left the House in 1973.
38	William A. Barrett	D	PA-01	January 3, 1949; Previous service, 1945–1947.	13th term*	
39	Charles Edward Bennett	D	FL-03	January 3, 1949	12th term	
40	Richard Walker Bolling	D	MO-05	January 3, 1949	12th term	
41	James J. Delaney	D	NY-09	January 3, 1949; Previous service, 1945–1947.	13th term*	
42	Gerald Ford	R	MI-05	January 3, 1949	12th term	
43	H. R. Gross	R	IA-03	January 3, 1949	12th term	
44	Wayne Hays	D	OH-18	January 3, 1949	12th term	
45	Carl D. Perkins	D	KY-07	January 3, 1949	12th term	
46	Peter W. Rodino	D	NJ-10	January 3, 1949	12th term	
47	Harley Orrin Staggers	D	WV-02	January 3, 1949	12th term	
48	Tom Steed	D	OK-04	January 3, 1949	12th term	
49	Clement J. Zablocki	D	WI-04	January 3, 1949	12th term	
50	John P. Saylor	R	PA-22	September 13, 1949	12th term	
51	William B. Widnall	R	NJ-07	February 6, 1950	12th term	
52	Page Belcher	R	OK-01	January 3, 1951	11th term	Left the House in 1973.
53	Jackson Edward Betts	R	OH-08	January 3, 1951	11th term	Left the House in 1973.
54	Frank T. Bow	R	OH-16	January 3, 1951	11th term	Died on November 13, 1972.
55	William G. Bray	R	IN-06	January 3, 1951	11th term	
56	William Jennings Bryan Dorn	D	SC-03	January 3, 1951; Previous service, 1947–1949.	12th term*	
57	John Jarman	D	OK-05	January 3, 1951	11th term	
58	John C. Kluczynski	D	IL-05	January 3, 1951	11th term	
59	William L. Springer	R	IL-22	January 3, 1951	11th term	Left the House in 1973.
60	John C. Watts	D	KY-06	April 4, 1951	11th term	Died on September 24, 1971.
61	John Dowdy	D	TX-02	September 23, 1952	11th term	Left the House in 1973.
62	Edward Boland	D	MA-02	January 3, 1953	10th term	
63	Jack Brooks	D	TX-09	January 3, 1953	10th term	
64	Joel Broyhill	R	VA-10	January 3, 1953	10th term	
65	James A. Byrne	D	PA-03	January 3, 1953	10th term	Left the House in 1973.
66	Elford Albin Cederberg	R	MI-10	January 3, 1953	10th term	
67	Ed Edmondson	D	OK-02	January 3, 1953	10th term	Left the House in 1973.
68	Lawrence H. Fountain	D	NC-02	January 3, 1953	10th term	
69	Peter Frelinghuysen, Jr.	R	NJ-05	January 3, 1953	10th term	
70	Charles S. Gubser	R	CA-10	January 3, 1953	10th term	
71	James A. Haley	D	FL-08	January 3, 1953	10th term	
72	Craig Hosmer	R	CA-32	January 3, 1953	10th term	
73	Charles R. Jonas	R	NC-09	January 3, 1953	10th term	Left the House in 1973.
74	Phillip M. Landrum	D	GA-09	January 3, 1953	10th term	
75	William S. Mailliard	R	CA-06	January 3, 1953	10th term	
76	John E. Moss	D	CA-03	January 3, 1953	10th term	
77	Tip O'Neill	D	MA-08	January 3, 1953	10th term	
78	Thomas Pelly	R	WA-01	January 3, 1953	10th term	Left the House in 1973.
79	Richard Harding Poff	R	VA-06	January 3, 1953	10th term	Resigned on August 29, 1972.
80	John J. Rhodes	R	AZ-01	January 3, 1953	10th term	
81	Leonor Sullivan	D	MO-03	January 3, 1953	10th term	
82	Bob Wilson	R	CA-36	January 3, 1953	10th term	
83	William Natcher	D	KY-02	August 1, 1953	10th term	
84	John James Flynt Jr.	D	GA-06	November 2, 1954	10th term	
85	Thomas W. L. Ashley	D	OH-09	January 3, 1955	9th term	
86	Frank M. Clark	D	PA-25	January 3, 1955	9th term	
87	Charles Diggs	D	MI-13	January 3, 1955	9th term	
88	Dante Fascell	D	FL-12	January 3, 1955	9th term	
89	Daniel J. Flood	D	PA-11	January 3, 1955; Previous service, 1945–1947 and 1949–1953.	12th term**	
90	Kenneth J. Gray	D	IL-21	January 3, 1955	9th term	
91	Edith Green	D	OR-03	January 3, 1955	9th term	
92	Martha Griffiths	D	MI-17	January 3, 1955	9th term	
93	William Raleigh Hull, Jr.	D	MO-06	January 3, 1955	9th term	
94	Torbert Macdonald	D	MA-07	January 3, 1955	9th term	
95	William Edwin Minshall, Jr.	R	OH-23	January 3, 1955	9th term	
96	Henry S. Reuss	D	WI-05	January 3, 1955	9th term	
97	Bernice F. Sisk	D	CA-16	January 3, 1955	9th term	
98	Charles M. Teague	R	CA-13	January 3, 1955	9th term	
99	Frank Thompson	D	NJ-04	January 3, 1955	9th term	
100	Charles Vanik	D	OH-22	January 3, 1955	9th term	
101	Jim Wright	D	TX-12	January 3, 1955	9th term	
102	Paul Rogers	D	FL-09	January 11, 1955	9th term	
103	John Dingell	D	MI-16	December 13, 1955	9th term	
104	Walter S. Baring Jr.	D	NV	January 3, 1957; Previous service, 1949–1953.	10th term*	Left the House in 1973.
105	William Broomfield	R	MI-18	January 3, 1957	8th term	
106	Charles E. Chamberlain	R	MI-06	January 3, 1957	8th term	
107	Harold R. Collier	R	IL-10	January 3, 1957	8th term	
108	Florence P. Dwyer	R	NJ-12	January 3, 1957	8th term	Left the House in 1973.
109	Alton Lennon	D	NC-07	January 3, 1957	8th term	Left the House in 1973.
110	John J. McFall	D	CA-15	January 3, 1957	8th term	
111	Robert Michel	R	IL-18	January 3, 1957	8th term	
112	H. Allen Smith	R	CA-20	January 3, 1957	8th term	Left the House in 1973.
113	Al Ullman	D	OR-02	January 3, 1957	8th term	
114	John Andrew Young	D	TX-14	January 3, 1957	8th term	
115	Howard W. Robison	R	NY-33	January 14, 1958	8th term	
116	John Herman Dent	D	PA-21	January 21, 1958	8th term	
117	Al Quie	R	MN-01	February 18, 1958	8th term	
118	Robert N.C. Nix, Sr.	D	PA-02	May 20, 1958	8th term	
119	John Brademas	D	IN-03	January 3, 1959	7th term	
120	James A. Burke	D	MA-11	January 3, 1959	7th term	
121	Robert R. Casey	D	TX-22	January 3, 1959	7th term	
122	Silvio O. Conte	R	MA-01	January 3, 1959	7th term	
123	Dominick V. Daniels	D	NJ-14	January 3, 1959	7th term	
124	Ed Derwinski	R	IL-04	January 3, 1959	7th term	
125	Samuel L. Devine	R	OH-12	January 3, 1959	7th term	
126	Thomas N. Downing	D	VA-01	January 3, 1959	7th term	
127	Thaddeus J. Dulski	D	NY-41	January 3, 1959	7th term	
128	Cornelius Edward Gallagher	D	NJ-13	January 3, 1959	7th term	Left the House in 1973.
129	Robert Giaimo	D	CT-03	January 3, 1959	7th term	
130	Ken Hechler	D	WV-04	January 3, 1959	7th term	
131	Seymour Halpern	R	NY-06	January 3, 1959	7th term	Left the House in 1973.
132	Harold T. Johnson	D	CA-02	January 3, 1959	7th term	
133	Joseph Karth	D	MN-04	January 3, 1959	7th term	
134	Robert Kastenmeier	D	WI-02	January 3, 1959	7th term	
135	Hastings Keith	D	MA-12	January 3, 1959	7th term	Left the House in 1973.
136	Del Latta	R	OH-05	January 3, 1959	7th term	
137	John S. Monagan	D	CT-05	January 3, 1959	7th term	Left the House in 1973.
138	William S. Moorhead	D	PA-14	January 3, 1959	7th term	
139	Ancher Nelsen	R	MN-02	January 3, 1959	7th term	
140	James G. O'Hara	D	MI-12	January 3, 1959	7th term	
141	Alexander Pirnie	R	NY-32	January 3, 1959	7th term	Left the House in 1973.
142	Roman C. Pucinski	D	IL-11	January 3, 1959	7th term	Left the House in 1973.
143	Dan Rostenkowski	D	IL-08	January 3, 1959	7th term	
144	George E. Shipley	D	IL-23	January 3, 1959	7th term	
145	John M. Slack, Jr.	D	WV-03	January 3, 1959	7th term	
146	Neal Smith	D	IA-05	January 3, 1959	7th term	
147	Samuel S. Stratton	D	NY-29	January 3, 1959	7th term	
148	Frank Stubblefield	D	KY-01	January 3, 1959	7th term	
149	William J. Randall	D	MO-04	March 3, 1959	7th term	
150	Herman T. Schneebeli	R	PA-17	April 26, 1960	7th term	
151	Roy A. Taylor	D	NC-11	June 25, 1960	7th term	
152	Julia Butler Hansen	D	WA-03	November 8, 1960	7th term	
153	J. Irving Whalley	R	PA-12	November 8, 1960	7th term	Left the House in 1973.
154	Joseph Patrick Addabbo	D	NY-07	January 3, 1961	6th term	
155	John B. Anderson	R	IL-16	January 3, 1961	6th term	
156	John M. Ashbrook	R	OH-17	January 3, 1961	6th term	
157	Alphonzo E. Bell, Jr.	R	CA-28	January 3, 1961	6th term	
158	Hugh Carey	D	NY-15	January 3, 1961	6th term	
159	Donald D. Clancy	R	OH-02	January 3, 1961	6th term	
160	James C. Corman	D	CA-22	January 3, 1961	6th term	
161	John W. Davis	D	GA-07	January 3, 1961	6th term	
162	Paul Findley	R	IL-20	January 3, 1961	6th term	
163	Fernand St. Germain	D	RI-01	January 3, 1961	6th term	
164	Durward Gorham Hall	R	MO-07	January 3, 1961	6th term	Left the House in 1973.
165	George Elliott Hagan	D	GA-01	January 3, 1961	6th term	Left the House in 1973.
166	Bill Harsha	R	OH-06	January 3, 1961	6th term	
167	R. James Harvey	R	MI-08	January 3, 1961	6th term	
168	David N. Henderson	D	NC-03	January 3, 1961	6th term	
169	Richard Howard Ichord, Jr.	D	MO-08	January 3, 1961	6th term	
170	Carleton J. King	R	NY-30	January 3, 1961	6th term	
171	David Martin	R	NE-03	January 3, 1961	6th term	
172	F. Bradford Morse	R	MA-05	January 3, 1961	6th term	Resigned on May 1, 1972.
173	Charles Adams Mosher	R	OH-13	January 3, 1961	6th term	
174	Otis G. Pike	D	NY-01	January 3, 1961	6th term	
175	William Fitts Ryan	D	NY-20	January 3, 1961	6th term	Died on September 17, 1972.
176	Garner E. Shriver	R	KS-04	January 3, 1961	6th term	
177	Robert Stafford	R	VT	January 3, 1961	6th term	Resigned on September 16, 1971.
178	Robert Grier Stephens, Jr.	D	GA-10	January 3, 1961	6th term	
179	Vernon Wallace Thomson	R	WI-03	January 3, 1961	6th term	
180	Mo Udall	D	AZ-02	May 2, 1961	6th term	
181	Henry B. González	D	TX-20	November 4, 1961	6th term	
182	Lucien N. Nedzi	D	MI-14	November 7, 1961	6th term	
183	Joe Waggonner	D	LA-04	December 19, 1961	6th term	
184	Graham B. Purcell, Jr.	D	TX-13	January 27, 1962	6th term	Left the House in 1973.
185	Ray Roberts	D	TX-04	January 30, 1962	6th term	
186	Benjamin S. Rosenthal	D	NY-08	February 20, 1962	6th term	
187	Jim Broyhill	R	NC-10	January 3, 1963	5th term	
188	James Colgate Cleveland	R	NH-02	January 3, 1963	5th term	
189	Lionel Van Deerlin	D	CA-37	January 3, 1963	5th term	
190	Don Edwards	D	CA-09	January 3, 1963	5th term	
191	Donald M. Fraser	D	MN-05	January 3, 1963	5th term	
192	Richard Fulton	D	TN-05	January 3, 1963	5th term	
193	Don Fuqua	D	FL-02	January 3, 1963	5th term	
194	Sam Gibbons	D	FL-07	January 3, 1963	5th term	
195	James R. Grover	R	NY-02	January 3, 1963	5th term	
196	Richard T. Hanna	D	CA-34	January 3, 1963	5th term	
197	Augustus F. Hawkins	D	CA-21	January 3, 1963	5th term	
198	Frank Horton	R	NY-36	January 3, 1963	5th term	
199	J. Edward Hutchinson	R	MI-04	January 3, 1963	5th term	
200	Robert L. Leggett	D	CA-04	January 3, 1963	5th term	
201	Clarence Long	D	MD-02	January 3, 1963	5th term	
202	Spark Matsunaga	D	HI-01	January 3, 1963	5th term	
203	Robert McClory	R	IL-12	January 3, 1963	5th term	
204	Joseph McDade	R	PA-10	January 3, 1963	5th term	
205	Joseph Minish	D	NJ-11	January 3, 1963	5th term	
206	Rogers Morton	R	MD-01	January 3, 1963	5th term	Resigned on January 29, 1971.
207	John M. Murphy	D	NY-16	January 3, 1963	5th term	
208	Edward J. Patten	D	NJ-15	January 3, 1963	5th term	
209	Claude Pepper	D	FL-11	January 3, 1963	5th term	
210	Jimmy Quillen	R	TN-01	January 3, 1963	5th term	
211	Charlotte Thompson Reid	R	IL-15	January 3, 1963	5th term	Resigned on October 7, 1971.
212	Ogden Reid	R	NY-26	January 3, 1963	5th term	
213	Edward R. Roybal	D	CA-30	January 3, 1963	5th term	
214	Joe Skubitz	R	KS-05	January 3, 1963	5th term	
215	Burt L. Talcott	R	CA-12	January 3, 1963	5th term	
216	Charles H. Wilson	D	CA-31	January 3, 1963	5th term	
217	John W. Wydler	R	NY-04	January 3, 1963	5th term	
218	Don H. Clausen	R	CA-01	January 22, 1963	5th term	
219	Del M. Clawson	R	CA-23	June 11, 1963	5th term	
220	Fred B. Rooney	D	PA-15	July 30, 1963	5th term	
221	Mark Andrews	R	ND-01	October 22, 1963	5th term	
222	Albert W. Johnson	R	PA-23	November 5, 1963	5th term	
223	J. J. Pickle	D	TX-10	December 21, 1963	5th term	
224	Phillip Burton	D	CA-05	February 18, 1964	5th term	
225	William J. Green, III	D	PA-05	April 28, 1964	5th term	
226	Thomas S. Gettys	D	SC-05	November 3, 1964	5th term	
227	William L. Hungate	D	MO-09	November 3, 1964	5th term	
228	Wendell Wyatt	R	OR-01	November 3, 1964	5th term	
229	Brock Adams	D	WA-07	January 3, 1965	4th term	
230	William Anderson	D	TN-06	January 3, 1965	4th term	Left the House in 1973.
231	Frank Annunzio	D	IL-07	January 3, 1965	4th term	
232	Jonathan Brewster Bingham	D	NY-23	January 3, 1965	4th term	
233	John Hall Buchanan, Jr.	R	AL-06	January 3, 1965	4th term	
234	Earle Cabell	D	TX-05	January 3, 1965	4th term	Left the House in 1973.
235	Tim Lee Carter	R	KY-05	January 3, 1965	4th term	
236	Barber Conable	R	NY-37	January 3, 1965	4th term	
237	John Conyers	D	MI-01	January 3, 1965	4th term	
238	John Culver	D	IA-02	January 3, 1965	4th term	
239	Glenn Robert Davis	R	WI-09	January 3, 1965; Previous service, 1947–1957.	9th term*	
240	Bill Dickinson	R	AL-02	January 3, 1965	4th term	
241	John Duncan, Sr.	R	TN-02	January 3, 1965	4th term	
242	Jack Edwards	R	AL-01	January 3, 1965	4th term	
243	John N. Erlenborn	R	IL-14	January 3, 1965	4th term	
244	Frank Evans	D	CO-03	January 3, 1965	4th term	
245	Tom Foley	D	WA-05	January 3, 1965	4th term	
246	William Ford	D	MI-15	January 3, 1965	4th term	
247	Kika De la Garza	D	TX-15	January 3, 1965	4th term	
248	Lee Hamilton	D	IN-09	January 3, 1965	4th term	
249	James M. Hanley	D	NY-35	January 3, 1965	4th term	
250	William Hathaway	D	ME-02	January 3, 1965	4th term	Left the House in 1973.
251	Henry Helstoski	D	NJ-09	January 3, 1965	4th term	
252	Floyd Hicks	D	WA-06	January 3, 1965	4th term	
253	James J. Howard	D	NJ-03	January 3, 1965	4th term	
254	Andrew Jacobs, Jr.	D	IN-11	January 3, 1965	4th term	Left the House in 1973.
255	James Kee	D	WV-05	January 3, 1965	4th term	Left the House in 1973.
256	Speedy O. Long	D	LA-08	January 3, 1965	4th term	Left the House in 1973.
257	Robert C. McEwen	R	NY-31	January 3, 1965	4th term	
258	Lloyd Meeds	D	WA-02	January 3, 1965	4th term	
259	Patsy Mink	D	HI-02	January 3, 1965	4th term	
260	David E. Satterfield III	D	VA-03	January 3, 1965	4th term	
261	James H. Scheuer	D	NY-21	January 3, 1965	4th term	Left the House in 1973.
262	Henry P. Smith III	R	NY-40	January 3, 1965	4th term	
263	J. William Stanton	R	OH-11	January 3, 1965	4th term	
264	Joseph P. Vigorito	D	PA-24	January 3, 1965	4th term	
265	Richard Crawford White	D	TX-16	January 3, 1965	4th term	
266	Lester L. Wolff	D	NY-03	January 3, 1965	4th term	
267	Sidney Yates	D	IL-09	January 3, 1965; Previous service, 1949–1963.	11th term*	
268	Edwin Edwards	D	LA-07	October 2, 1965	4th term	Resigned on May 9, 1972.
269	Clarence E. Brown, Jr.	R	OH-07	November 2, 1965	4th term	
270	Thomas M. Rees	D	CA-26	December 15, 1965	4th term	
271	Walter B. Jones, Sr.	D	NC-01	February 5, 1966	4th term	
272	Jerome R. Waldie	D	CA-14	June 7, 1966	4th term	
273	Guy Vander Jagt	R	MI-09	November 8, 1966	4th term	
274	David Pryor	D	AR-04	November 8, 1966	4th term	Left the House in 1973.
275	Tom Bevill	D	AL-07	January 3, 1967	3rd term	
276	Edward G. Biester, Jr.	R	PA-08	January 3, 1967	3rd term	
277	Benjamin B. Blackburn	R	GA-04	January 3, 1967	3rd term	
278	Ray Blanton	D	TN-07	January 3, 1967	3rd term	Left the House in 1973.
279	Frank J. Brasco	D	NY-11	January 3, 1967	3rd term	
280	Jack Thomas Brinkley	D	GA-03	January 3, 1967	3rd term	
281	Donald G. Brotzman	R	CO-02	January 3, 1967; Previous service, 1963–1965.	4th term*	
282	Garry E. Brown	R	MI-03	January 3, 1967	3rd term	
283	J. Herbert Burke	R	FL-10	January 3, 1967	3rd term	
284	John R. Dellenback	R	OR-04	January 3, 1967	3rd term	
285	Robert C. Eckhardt	D	TX-08	January 3, 1967	3rd term	
286	Joshua Eilberg	D	PA-04	January 3, 1967	3rd term	
287	Marvin L. Esch	R	MI-02	January 3, 1967	3rd term	
288	Edwin Duing Eshleman	R	PA-16	January 3, 1967	3rd term	
289	Nick Galifianakis	D	NC-04	January 3, 1967	3rd term	Left the House in 1973.
290	George Atlee Goodling	R	PA-19	January 3, 1967; Previous service, 1961–1965.	5th term*	
291	Gilbert Gude	R	MD-08	January 3, 1967	3rd term	
292	John Paul Hammerschmidt	R	AR-03	January 3, 1967	3rd term	
293	Margaret Heckler	R	MA-10	January 3, 1967	3rd term	
294	John E. Hunt	R	NJ-01	January 3, 1967	3rd term	
295	Abraham Kazen	D	TX-23	January 3, 1967	3rd term	
296	Dan Kuykendall	R	TN-09	January 3, 1967	3rd term	
297	John Henry Kyl	R	IA-04	January 3, 1967; Previous service, 1959–1965.	6th term*	Left the House in 1973.
298	Peter Kyros	D	ME-01	January 3, 1967	3rd term	
299	Sherman P. Lloyd	R	UT-02	January 3, 1967; Previous service, 1963–1965.	4th term*	Left the House in 1973.
300	Bob Mathias	R	CA-18	January 3, 1967	3rd term	
301	Wiley Mayne	R	IA-06	January 3, 1967	3rd term	
302	James A. McClure	R	ID-01	January 3, 1967	3rd term	Left the House in 1973.
303	Jack H. McDonald	R	MI-19	January 3, 1967	3rd term	Left the House in 1973.
304	Clarence E. Miller	R	OH-10	January 3, 1967	3rd term	
305	Sonny Montgomery	D	MS-04	January 3, 1967	3rd term	
306	John Myers	R	IN-07	January 3, 1967	3rd term	
307	Bill Nichols	D	AL-04	January 3, 1967	3rd term	
308	Jerry Pettis	R	CA-33	January 3, 1967	3rd term	
309	Bob Price	R	TX-18	January 3, 1967	3rd term	
310	Tom Railsback	R	IL-19	January 3, 1967	3rd term	
311	John Rarick	D	LA-06	January 3, 1967	3rd term	
312	Donald W. Riegle, Jr.	R	MI-07	January 3, 1967	3rd term	
313	Philip Ruppe	R	MI-11	January 3, 1967	3rd term	
314	Charles W. Sandman, Jr.	R	NJ-02	January 3, 1967	3rd term	
315	Fred Schwengel	R	IA-01	January 3, 1967; Previous service, 1955–1965.	8th term*	Left the House in 1973.
316	William J. Scherle	R	IA-07	January 3, 1967	3rd term	
317	William L. Scott	R	VA-08	January 3, 1967	3rd term	Left the House in 1973.
318	Gene Snyder	R	KY-04	January 3, 1967; Previous service, 1963–1965.	4th term*	
319	Sam Steiger	R	AZ-03	January 3, 1967	3rd term	
320	William A. Steiger	R	WI-06	January 3, 1967	3rd term	
321	W. S. Stuckey, Jr.	D	GA-08	January 3, 1967	3rd term	
322	Fletcher Thompson	R	GA-05	January 3, 1967	3rd term	Left the House in 1973.
323	William C. Wampler	R	VA-09	January 3, 1967; Previous service, 1953–1955.	4th term*	
324	Charles W. Whalen, Jr.	R	OH-03	January 3, 1967	3rd term	
325	Charles E. Wiggins	R	CA-25	January 3, 1967	3rd term	
326	Lawrence G. Williams	R	PA-07	January 3, 1967	3rd term	
327	Larry Winn	R	KS-03	January 3, 1967	3rd term	
328	Chalmers Wylie	R	OH-15	January 3, 1967	3rd term	
329	Louis C. Wyman	R	NH-01	January 3, 1967; Previous service, 1963–1965.	4th term*	
330	Roger H. Zion	R	IN-08	January 3, 1967	3rd term	
331	John M. Zwach	R	MN-06	January 3, 1967	3rd term	
332	Robert Tiernan	D	RI-02	March 28, 1967	3rd term	
333	Pete McCloskey	R	CA-11	December 12, 1967	3rd term	
334	Bertram L. Podell	D	NY-13	February 20, 1968	3rd term	
335	Charles H. Griffin	D	MS-03	March 12, 1968	3rd term	Left the House in 1973.
336	James M. Collins	R	TX-03	August 24, 1968	3rd term	
337	Joseph M. Gaydos	D	PA-20	November 5, 1968	3rd term	
338	Bill Alexander	D	AR-01	January 3, 1969	2nd term	
339	Glenn M. Anderson	D	CA-17	January 3, 1969	2nd term	
340	Mario Biaggi	D	NY-24	January 3, 1969	2nd term	
341	Bill Burlison	D	MO-10	January 3, 1969	2nd term	
342	Patrick T. Caffery	D	LA-03	January 3, 1969	2nd term	Left the House in 1973.
343	John Newbold Camp	R	OK-06	January 3, 1969	2nd term	
344	William V. Chappell, Jr.	D	FL-04	January 3, 1969	2nd term	
345	Shirley Chisholm	D	NY-12	January 3, 1969	2nd term	
346	Bill Clay	D	MO-01	January 3, 1969	2nd term	
347	Lawrence Coughlin	R	PA-13	January 3, 1969	2nd term	
348	Dan Daniel	D	VA-05	January 3, 1969	2nd term	
349	David W. Dennis	R	IN-10	January 3, 1969	2nd term	
350	Hamilton Fish	R	NY-28	January 3, 1969	2nd term	
351	Walter Flowers	D	AL-05	January 3, 1969	2nd term	
352	Louis Frey, Jr.	R	FL-05	January 3, 1969	2nd term	
353	Orval H. Hansen	R	ID-02	January 3, 1969	2nd term	
354	James F. Hastings	R	NY-38	January 3, 1969	2nd term	
355	Lawrence Hogan	R	MD-05	January 3, 1969	2nd term	
356	Ed Koch	D	NY-17	January 3, 1969	2nd term	
357	Earl Landgrebe	R	IN-02	January 3, 1969	2nd term	
358	Manuel Lujan, Jr.	R	NM-01	January 3, 1969	2nd term	
359	James Robert Mann	D	SC-04	January 3, 1969	2nd term	
360	Abner J. Mikva	D	IL-02	January 3, 1969	2nd term	Left the House in 1973.
361	Wilmer Mizell	R	NC-05	January 3, 1969	2nd term	
362	Bob Mollohan	D	WV-01	January 3, 1969; Previous service, 1953–1957.	4th term*	
363	L. Richardson Preyer	D	NC-06	January 3, 1969	2nd term	
364	Earl B. Ruth	R	NC-08	January 3, 1969	2nd term	
365	Keith Sebelius	R	KS-01	January 3, 1969	2nd term	
366	Louis Stokes	D	OH-21	January 3, 1969	2nd term	
367	James W. Symington	D	MO-02	January 3, 1969	2nd term	
368	G. William Whitehurst	R	VA-02	January 3, 1969	2nd term	
369	Gus Yatron	D	PA-06	January 3, 1969	2nd term	
370	Ed Jones	D	TN-08	March 25, 1969	2nd term	
371	Dave Obey	D	WI-07	April 1, 1969	2nd term	
372	Barry Goldwater, Jr.	R	CA-27	April 29, 1969	2nd term	
373	John Melcher	D	MT-02	June 24, 1969	2nd term	
374	Michael J. Harrington	D	MA-06	September 30, 1969	2nd term	
375	Robert A. Roe	D	NJ-08	November 4, 1969	2nd term	
376	Phil Crane	R	IL-13	November 25, 1969	2nd term	
377	John H. Rousselot	R	CA-24	June 30, 1970; Previous service, 1961–1963.	3rd term*	
378	John G. Schmitz	R	CA-35	June 30, 1970	2nd term	Left the House in 1973.
379	Charles J. Carney	D	OH-19	November 3, 1970	2nd term	
380	George W. Collins	D	IL-06	November 3, 1970	2nd term	Died on December 8, 1972.
381	Edwin B. Forsythe	R	NJ-06	November 3, 1970	2nd term	
382	Robert H. Steele	R	CT-02	November 3, 1970	2nd term	
383	John H. Ware III	R	PA-09	November 3, 1970	2nd term	
384	James Abourezk	D	SD-02	January 3, 1971	1st term	Left the House in 1973.
385	Bella Abzug	D	NY-19	January 3, 1971	1st term	
386	Bill Archer	R	TX-07	January 3, 1971	1st term	
387	Les Aspin	D	WI-01	January 3, 1971	1st term	
388	Herman Badillo	D	NY-22	January 3, 1971	1st term	
389	LaMar Baker	R	TN-03	January 3, 1971	1st term	
390	Nick Begich	D	AK	January 3, 1971	1st term	Died on October 16, 1972.
391	Robert Bergland	D	MN-07	January 3, 1971	1st term	
392	Goodloe Byron	D	MD-06	January 3, 1971	1st term	
393	William R. Cotter	D	CT-01	January 3, 1971	1st term	
394	George E. Danielson	D	CA-29	January 3, 1971	1st term	
395	Ron Dellums	D	CA-07	January 3, 1971	1st term	
396	Frank E. Denholm	D	SD-01	January 3, 1971	1st term	
397	John G. Dow	D	NY-27	January 3, 1971; Previous service, 1965–1969.	3rd term*	Left the House in 1973.
398	Robert Drinan	D	MA-03	January 3, 1971	1st term	
399	Bill Frenzel	R	MN-03	January 3, 1971	1st term	
400	Ella T. Grasso	D	CT-06	January 3, 1971	1st term	
401	Elwood Hillis	R	IN-05	January 3, 1971	1st term	
402	Louise Day Hicks	D	MA-09	January 3, 1971	1st term	Left the House in 1973.
403	William J. Keating	R	OH-01	January 3, 1971	1st term	
404	Jack Kemp	R	NY-39	January 3, 1971	1st term	
405	Norman F. Lent	R	NY-05	January 3, 1971	1st term	
406	Arthur A. Link	D	ND-02	January 3, 1971	1st term	Resigned on January 2, 1973.
407	Dawson Mathis	D	GA-02	January 3, 1971	1st term	
408	Romano Mazzoli	D	KY-03	January 3, 1971	1st term	
409	John Y. McCollister	R	NE-02	January 3, 1971	1st term	
410	Mike McCormack	D	WA-04	January 3, 1971	1st term	
411	K. Gunn McKay	D	UT-01	January 3, 1971	1st term	
412	Mike McKevitt	R	CO-01	January 3, 1971	1st term	Left the House in 1973.
413	Stewart McKinney	R	CT-04	January 3, 1971	1st term	
414	Ralph Metcalfe	D	IL-01	January 3, 1971	1st term	
415	Parren Mitchell	D	MD-07	January 3, 1971	1st term	
416	Morgan F. Murphy	D	IL-03	January 3, 1971	1st term	
417	Peter A. Peyser	R	NY-25	January 3, 1971	1st term	
418	Walter E. Powell	R	OH-24	January 3, 1971	1st term	
419	Pierre S. du Pont IV	R	DE	January 3, 1971	1st term	
420	Charles B. Rangel	D	NY-18	January 3, 1971	1st term	
421	J. Kenneth Robinson	R	VA-07	January 3, 1971	1st term	
422	Teno Roncalio	D	WY	January 3, 1971; Previous service, 1965–1967.	2nd term*	
423	J. Edward Roush	D	IN-04	January 3, 1971; Previous service, 1959–1969.	6th term*	
424	William R. Roy	D	KS-02	January 3, 1971	1st term	
425	Harold L. Runnels	D	NM-02	January 3, 1971	1st term	
426	Paul Sarbanes	D	MD-04	January 3, 1971	1st term	
427	John F. Seiberling	D	OH-14	January 3, 1971	1st term	
428	Dick Shoup	R	MT-01	January 3, 1971	1st term	
429	Floyd Spence	R	SC-02	January 3, 1971	1st term	
430	James V. Stanton	D	OH-20	January 3, 1971	1st term	
431	John H. Terry	R	NY-34	January 3, 1971	1st term	Left the House in 1973.
432	Charles Thone	R	NE-01	January 3, 1971	1st term	
433	Victor Veysey	R	CA-38	January 3, 1971	1st term	
434	Bill Young	R	FL-06	January 3, 1971	1st term	
	Mendel Jackson Davis	D	SC-01	April 27, 1971	1st term	
	William Oswald Mills	R	MD-01	May 25, 1971	1st term	
	H. John Heinz III	R	PA-18	November 2, 1971	1st term	
	William P. Curlin, Jr.	D	KY-06	December 4, 1971	1st term	Left the House in 1973.
	Richard W. Mallary	R	VT	January 7, 1972	1st term	
	Elizabeth B. Andrews	R	AL-03	April 4, 1972	1st term	Left the House in 1973.
	Cliffard D. Carlson	R	IL-15	April 4, 1972	1st term	Left the House in 1973.
	William Sheldrick Conover	R	PA-27	April 25, 1972	1st term	Left the House in 1973.
	John Breaux	D	LA-07	September 30, 1972	1st term	
	M. Caldwell Butler	R	VA-06	November 7, 1972	1st term	

== Delegates ==
Rank	Delegate	Party	District	Seniority date (Previous service, if any)	No.# of term(s)	Notes
1	Jorge Luis Córdova	PNP	PR	January 3, 1969	2nd term	
2	Walter E. Fauntroy	D	DC	March 23, 1971	1st term	

== See also ==
- 92nd United States Congress
- List of United States congressional districts
- List of United States senators in the 92nd Congress
