= Mottl =

Mottl is a surname. Notable people with the surname include:

- Ron Mottl Jr. (born 1962), American Democratic politician
- Felix Mottl (1856–1911), Austrian conductor and composer
- Mária Mottl (1906–1980), Hungarian speleologist and vertebrate paleontologist
- Michael Mottl (born 1968), sailor from Australia
- Ronald M. Mottl (1934–2023), American lawyer and politician
- Václav Mottl (1914–1982), Czech sprint canoeist

== See also ==
- Mott
- Mottle
