= List of United States representatives in the 94th Congress =

This is a complete list of United States representatives during the 94th United States Congress listed by seniority.

As an historical article, the districts and party affiliations listed reflect those during the 94th Congress (January 3, 1975 – January 3, 1977). Seats and party affiliations on similar lists for other congresses will be different for certain members.

Seniority depends on the date on which members were sworn into office. Since many members are sworn in on the same day, subsequent ranking is based on previous congressional service of the individual and then by alphabetical order by the last name of the representative.

Committee chairmanship in the House is often associated with seniority. However, party leadership is typically not associated with seniority.

Note: The "*" indicates that the representative/delegate may have served one or more non-consecutive terms while in the House of Representatives of the United States Congress.

== U.S. House seniority list ==
U.S. House seniority
Rank	Representative	Party	District	Seniority date (Previous service, if any)	No.# of term(s)	Notes
1	Wright Patman	D	TX-01	March 4, 1929	24th term	Dean of the House; Died on March 7, 1976.
2	George H. Mahon	D	TX-19	January 3, 1935	21st term	Became Dean of the House after Patman died.
3	William R. Poage	D	TX-11	January 3, 1937	20th term	
4	Wilbur Mills	D	AR-02	January 3, 1939	19th term	Left the House in 1977.
5	Felix Edward Hébert	D	LA-01	January 3, 1941	18th term	Left the House in 1977.
6	Jamie Whitten	D	MS-01	November 4, 1941	18th term	
7	Ray Madden	D	IN-01	January 3, 1943	17th term	Left the House in 1977.
8	Thomas E. Morgan	D	PA-22	January 3, 1945	16th term	Left the House in 1977.
9	Charles Melvin Price	D	IL-23	January 3, 1945	16th term	
10	Robert L. F. Sikes	D	FL-01	January 3, 1945; Previous service, 1941–1944.	18th term*	
11	Olin E. Teague	D	TX-06	August 24, 1946	16th term	
12	Carl Albert	D	OK-03	January 3, 1947	15th term	Speaker of the House; Left the House in 1977.
13	Omar Burleson	D	TX-17	January 3, 1947	15th term	
14	Joe L. Evins	D	TN-04	January 3, 1947	15th term	Left the House in 1977.
15	Otto Passman	D	LA-05	January 3, 1947	15th term	Left the House in 1977.
16	Robert E. Jones, Jr.	D	AL-05	January 28, 1947	15th term	Left the House in 1977.
17	William A. Barrett	D	PA-01	January 3, 1949; Previous service, 1945–1947.	15th term*	Died on April 12, 1976.
18	Charles Edward Bennett	D	FL-03	January 3, 1949	14th term	
19	Richard Walker Bolling	D	MO-05	January 3, 1949	14th term	
20	James J. Delaney	D	NY-09	January 3, 1949; Previous service, 1945–1947.	15th term*	
21	Wayne Hays	D	OH-18	January 3, 1949	14th term	Resigned on September 1, 1976.
22	Carl D. Perkins	D	KY-07	January 3, 1949	14th term	
23	Peter W. Rodino	D	NJ-10	January 3, 1949	14th term	
24	Harley Orrin Staggers	D	WV-02	January 3, 1949	14th term	
25	Tom Steed	D	OK-04	January 3, 1949	14th term	
26	Clement J. Zablocki	D	WI-04	January 3, 1949	14th term	
27	John Jarman	D	OK-05	January 3, 1951	13th term	Left the House in 1977.
28	John C. Kluczynski	D	IL-05	January 3, 1951	13th term	Died on January 26, 1975.
29	Jack Brooks	D	TX-09	January 3, 1953	12th term	
30	Edward Boland	D	MA-02	January 3, 1953	12th term	
31	Elford Albin Cederberg	R	MI-10	January 3, 1953	12th term	
32	Lawrence H. Fountain	D	NC-02	January 3, 1953	12th term	
33	James A. Haley	D	FL-08	January 3, 1953	12th term	Left the House in 1977.
34	Phillip M. Landrum	D	GA-09	January 3, 1953	12th term	Left the House in 1977.
35	John E. Moss	D	CA-03	January 3, 1953	12th term	
36	Tip O'Neill	D	MA-08	January 3, 1953	12th term	
37	John J. Rhodes	R	AZ-01	January 3, 1953	12th term	
38	Leonor Sullivan	D	MO-03	January 3, 1953	12th term	Left the House in 1977.
39	Bob Wilson	R	CA-41	January 3, 1953	12th term	
40	William Natcher	D	KY-02	August 1, 1953	12th term	
41	John James Flynt, Jr.	D	GA-06	November 2, 1954	12th term	
42	Thomas W. L. Ashley	D	OH-09	January 3, 1955	11th term	
43	Charles Diggs	D	MI-13	January 3, 1955	11th term	
44	Dante Fascell	D	FL-15	January 3, 1955	11th term	
45	Daniel J. Flood	D	PA-11	January 3, 1955; Previous service, 1945–1947 and 1949–1953.	14th term**	
46	Torbert Macdonald	D	MA-07	January 3, 1955	11th term	Died on May 21, 1976.
47	Henry S. Reuss	D	WI-05	January 3, 1955	11th term	
48	Bernice F. Sisk	D	CA-15	January 3, 1955	11th term	
49	Frank Thompson	D	NJ-04	January 3, 1955	11th term	
50	Charles Vanik	D	OH-22	January 3, 1955	11th term	
51	Jim Wright	D	TX-12	January 3, 1955	11th term	
52	Paul Rogers	D	FL-11	January 11, 1955	11th term	
53	John Dingell	D	MI-16	December 13, 1955	11th term	
54	William Broomfield	R	MI-19	January 3, 1957	10th term	
55	John J. McFall	D	CA-14	January 3, 1957	10th term	
56	Robert Michel	R	IL-18	January 3, 1957	10th term	
57	Al Ullman	D	OR-02	January 3, 1957	10th term	
58	John Andrew Young	D	TX-14	January 3, 1957	10th term	
59	John Herman Dent	D	PA-21	January 21, 1958	10th term	
60	Al Quie	R	MN-01	February 18, 1958	10th term	
61	Robert N.C. Nix, Sr.	D	PA-02	May 20, 1958	10th term	
62	John Brademas	D	IN-03	January 3, 1959	9th term	
63	James A. Burke	D	MA-11	January 3, 1959	9th term	
64	Robert R. Casey	D	TX-22	January 3, 1959	9th term	Resigned on January 22, 1976.
65	Silvio O. Conte	R	MA-01	January 3, 1959	9th term	
66	Dominick V. Daniels	D	NJ-14	January 3, 1959	9th term	
67	Ed Derwinski	R	IL-04	January 3, 1959	9th term	
68	Samuel L. Devine	R	OH-12	January 3, 1959	9th term	
69	Thomas N. Downing	D	VA-01	January 3, 1959	9th term	Left the House in 1977.
70	Robert Giaimo	D	CT-03	January 3, 1959	9th term	
71	Ken Hechler	D	WV-04	January 3, 1959	9th term	Left the House in 1977.
72	Harold T. Johnson	D	CA-01	January 3, 1959	9th term	
73	Joseph Karth	D	MN-04	January 3, 1959	9th term	Left the House in 1977.
74	Robert Kastenmeier	D	WI-02	January 3, 1959	9th term	
75	Del Latta	R	OH-05	January 3, 1959	9th term	
76	William S. Moorhead	D	PA-14	January 3, 1959	9th term	
77	James G. O'Hara	D	MI-12	January 3, 1959	9th term	Left the House in 1977.
78	Dan Rostenkowski	D	IL-08	January 3, 1959	9th term	
79	George E. Shipley	D	IL-22	January 3, 1959	9th term	
80	John M. Slack, Jr.	D	WV-03	January 3, 1959	9th term	
81	Neal Smith	D	IA-04	January 3, 1959	9th term	
82	Samuel S. Stratton	D	NY-28	January 3, 1959	9th term	
83	William J. Randall	D	MO-04	March 3, 1959	9th term	Left the House in 1977.
84	Herman T. Schneebeli	R	PA-17	April 26, 1960	9th term	Left the House in 1977.
85	Roy A. Taylor	D	NC-11	June 25, 1960	9th term	Left the House in 1977.
86	Joseph Patrick Addabbo	D	NY-07	January 3, 1961	8th term	
87	John B. Anderson	R	IL-16	January 3, 1961	8th term	
88	John M. Ashbrook	R	OH-17	January 3, 1961	8th term	
89	Alphonzo E. Bell, Jr.	R	CA-27	January 3, 1961	8th term	Left the House in 1977.
90	Donald D. Clancy	R	OH-02	January 3, 1961	8th term	Left the House in 1977.
91	James C. Corman	D	CA-21	January 3, 1961	8th term	
92	Paul Findley	R	IL-20	January 3, 1961	8th term	
93	Fernand St. Germain	D	RI-01	January 3, 1961	8th term	
94	Bill Harsha	R	OH-06	January 3, 1961	8th term	
95	David N. Henderson	D	NC-03	January 3, 1961	8th term	Left the House in 1977.
96	Richard Howard Ichord, Jr.	D	MO-08	January 3, 1961	8th term	
97	Charles Adams Mosher	R	OH-13	January 3, 1961	8th term	Left the House in 1977.
98	Otis G. Pike	D	NY-01	January 3, 1961	8th term	
99	Garner E. Shriver	R	KS-04	January 3, 1961	8th term	Left the House in 1977.
100	Robert Grier Stephens, Jr.	D	GA-10	January 3, 1961	8th term	Left the House in 1977.
101	Mo Udall	D	AZ-02	May 2, 1961	8th term	
102	Henry B. González	D	TX-20	November 4, 1961	8th term	
103	Lucien N. Nedzi	D	MI-14	November 7, 1961	8th term	
104	Joe Waggonner	D	LA-04	December 19, 1961	8th term	
105	Ray Roberts	D	TX-04	January 30, 1962	8th term	
106	Benjamin S. Rosenthal	D	NY-08	February 20, 1962	8th term	
107	Jim Broyhill	R	NC-10	January 3, 1963	7th term	
108	James Colgate Cleveland	R	NH-02	January 3, 1963	7th term	
109	Lionel Van Deerlin	D	CA-42	January 3, 1963	7th term	
110	Don Edwards	D	CA-10	January 3, 1963	7th term	
111	Donald M. Fraser	D	MN-05	January 3, 1963	7th term	
112	Richard Fulton	D	TN-05	January 3, 1963	7th term	Resigned on August 14, 1975.
113	Don Fuqua	D	FL-02	January 3, 1963	7th term	
114	Sam Gibbons	D	FL-07	January 3, 1963	7th term	
115	Augustus F. Hawkins	D	CA-29	January 3, 1963	7th term	
116	Frank Horton	R	NY-34	January 3, 1963	7th term	
117	J. Edward Hutchinson	R	MI-04	January 3, 1963	7th term	Left the House in 1977.
118	Robert L. Leggett	D	CA-04	January 3, 1963	7th term	
119	Clarence Long	D	MD-02	January 3, 1963	7th term	
120	Spark Matsunaga	D	HI-01	January 3, 1963	7th term	Left the House in 1977.
121	Robert McClory	R	IL-13	January 3, 1963	7th term	
122	Joseph McDade	R	PA-10	January 3, 1963	7th term	
123	Joseph Minish	D	NJ-11	January 3, 1963	7th term	
124	John M. Murphy	D	NY-17	January 3, 1963	7th term	
125	Edward J. Patten	D	NJ-15	January 3, 1963	7th term	
126	Claude Pepper	D	FL-14	January 3, 1963	7th term	
127	Jimmy Quillen	R	TN-01	January 3, 1963	7th term	
128	Edward R. Roybal	D	CA-25	January 3, 1963	7th term	
129	Joe Skubitz	R	KS-05	January 3, 1963	7th term	
130	Burt L. Talcott	R	CA-16	January 3, 1963	7th term	
131	Charles H. Wilson	D	CA-31	January 3, 1963	7th term	
132	John W. Wydler	R	NY-05	January 3, 1963	7th term	
133	Don H. Clausen	R	CA-02	January 22, 1963	7th term	
134	Del M. Clawson	R	CA-33	June 11, 1963	7th term	
135	Fred B. Rooney	D	PA-15	July 30, 1963	7th term	
136	Mark Andrews	R	ND	October 22, 1963	7th term	
137	Albert W. Johnson	R	PA-23	November 5, 1963	7th term	Left the House in 1977.
138	J. J. Pickle	D	TX-10	December 21, 1963	7th term	
139	Phillip Burton	D	CA-06	February 18, 1964	7th term	
140	William J. Green, III	D	PA-03	April 28, 1964	7th term	Left the House in 1977.
141	William L. Hungate	D	MO-09	November 3, 1964	7th term	Left the House in 1977.
142	Brock Adams	D	WA-07	January 3, 1965	6th term	
143	Frank Annunzio	D	IL-11	January 3, 1965	6th term	
144	Jonathan Brewster Bingham	D	NY-22	January 3, 1965	6th term	
145	John Hall Buchanan, Jr.	R	AL-06	January 3, 1965	6th term	
146	Tim Lee Carter	R	KY-05	January 3, 1965	6th term	
147	Barber Conable	R	NY-35	January 3, 1965	6th term	
148	John Conyers	D	MI-01	January 3, 1965	6th term	
149	Bill Dickinson	R	AL-02	January 3, 1965	6th term	
150	John Duncan, Sr.	R	TN-02	January 3, 1965	6th term	
151	Jack Edwards	R	AL-01	January 3, 1965	6th term	
152	John N. Erlenborn	R	IL-14	January 3, 1965	6th term	
153	Frank Evans	D	CO-03	January 3, 1965	6th term	
154	Tom Foley	D	WA-05	January 3, 1965	6th term	
155	William Ford	D	MI-15	January 3, 1965	6th term	
156	Kika De la Garza	D	TX-15	January 3, 1965	6th term	
157	Lee Hamilton	D	IN-09	January 3, 1965	6th term	
158	James M. Hanley	D	NY-32	January 3, 1965	6th term	
159	Henry Helstoski	D	NJ-09	January 3, 1965	6th term	Left the House in 1977.
160	Floyd Hicks	D	WA-06	January 3, 1965	6th term	Left the House in 1977.
161	James J. Howard	D	NJ-03	January 3, 1965	6th term	
162	Lloyd Meeds	D	WA-02	January 3, 1965	6th term	
163	Robert C. McEwen	R	NY-30	January 3, 1965	6th term	
164	Patsy Mink	D	HI-02	January 3, 1965	6th term	Left the House in 1977.
165	David E. Satterfield III	D	VA-03	January 3, 1965	6th term	
166	J. William Stanton	R	OH-11	January 3, 1965	6th term	
167	Joseph P. Vigorito	D	PA-24	January 3, 1965	6th term	Left the House in 1977.
168	Richard Crawford White	D	TX-16	January 3, 1965	6th term	
169	Lester L. Wolff	D	NY-06	January 3, 1965	6th term	
170	Sidney Yates	D	IL-09	January 3, 1965; Previous service, 1949–1963.	13th term*	
171	Clarence E. Brown, Jr.	R	OH-07	November 2, 1965	6th term	
172	Thomas M. Rees	D	CA-23	December 15, 1965	6th term	Left the House in 1977.
173	Walter B. Jones, Sr.	D	NC-01	February 5, 1966	6th term	
174	Guy Vander Jagt	R	MI-09	November 8, 1966	6th term	
175	Tom Bevill	D	AL-04	January 3, 1967	5th term	
176	Edward G. Biester, Jr.	R	PA-08	January 3, 1967	5th term	Left the House in 1977.
177	Jack Thomas Brinkley	D	GA-03	January 3, 1967	5th term	
178	Garry E. Brown	R	MI-03	January 3, 1967	5th term	
179	J. Herbert Burke	R	FL-12	January 3, 1967	5th term	
180	Robert C. Eckhardt	D	TX-08	January 3, 1967	5th term	
181	Joshua Eilberg	D	PA-04	January 3, 1967	5th term	
182	Marvin L. Esch	R	MI-02	January 3, 1967	5th term	Left the House in 1977.
183	Edwin Duing Eshleman	R	PA-16	January 3, 1967	5th term	Left the House in 1977.
184	Gilbert Gude	R	MD-08	January 3, 1967	5th term	Left the House in 1977.
185	John Paul Hammerschmidt	R	AR-03	January 3, 1967	5th term	
186	Margaret Heckler	R	MA-10	January 3, 1967	5th term	
187	Abraham Kazen	D	TX-23	January 3, 1967	5th term	
188	Clarence E. Miller	R	OH-10	January 3, 1967	5th term	
189	Sonny Montgomery	D	MS-03	January 3, 1967	5th term	
190	John Myers	R	IN-07	January 3, 1967	5th term	
191	Bill Nichols	D	AL-03	January 3, 1967	5th term	
192	Jerry Pettis	R	CA-37	January 3, 1967	5th term	Died on February 14, 1975.
193	Tom Railsback	R	IL-19	January 3, 1967	5th term	
194	Donald W. Riegle, Jr.	D	MI-07	January 3, 1967	5th term	Resigned on December 30, 1976.
195	Philip Ruppe	R	MI-11	January 3, 1967	5th term	
196	Gene Snyder	R	KY-04	January 3, 1967; Previous service, 1963–1965.	6th term*	
197	Sam Steiger	R	AZ-03	January 3, 1967	5th term	Left the House in 1977.
198	William A. Steiger	R	WI-06	January 3, 1967	5th term	
199	W. S. Stuckey, Jr.	D	GA-08	January 3, 1967	5th term	
200	William C. Wampler	R	VA-09	January 3, 1967; Previous service, 1953–1955.	6th term*	
201	Charles W. Whalen, Jr.	R	OH-03	January 3, 1967	5th term	
202	Charles E. Wiggins	R	CA-39	January 3, 1967	5th term	
203	Larry Winn	R	KS-03	January 3, 1967	5th term	
204	Chalmers Wylie	R	OH-15	January 3, 1967	5th term	
205	Pete McCloskey	R	CA-12	December 12, 1967	5th term	
206	James M. Collins	R	TX-03	August 24, 1968	5th term	
207	Joseph M. Gaydos	D	PA-20	November 5, 1968	5th term	
208	Bill Alexander	D	AR-01	January 3, 1969	4th term	
209	Glenn M. Anderson	D	CA-32	January 3, 1969	4th term	
210	Mario Biaggi	D	NY-10	January 3, 1969	4th term	
211	Bill Burlison	D	MO-10	January 3, 1969	4th term	
212	William V. Chappell, Jr.	D	FL-04	January 3, 1969	4th term	
213	Shirley Chisholm	D	NY-12	January 3, 1969	4th term	
214	Bill Clay	D	MO-01	January 3, 1969	4th term	
215	Lawrence Coughlin	R	PA-13	January 3, 1969	4th term	
216	Dan Daniel	D	VA-05	January 3, 1969	4th term	
217	Hamilton Fish	R	NY-25	January 3, 1969	4th term	
218	Walter Flowers	D	AL-07	January 3, 1969	4th term	
219	Louis Frey, Jr.	R	FL-09	January 3, 1969	4th term	
220	James F. Hastings	R	NY-39	January 3, 1969	4th term	Resigned on January 20, 1976.
221	Ed Koch	D	NY-18	January 3, 1969	4th term	
222	Manuel Lujan, Jr.	R	NM-01	January 3, 1969	4th term	
223	James Robert Mann	D	SC-04	January 3, 1969	4th term	
224	Bob Mollohan	D	WV-01	January 3, 1969; Previous service, 1953–1957.	6th term*	
225	L. Richardson Preyer	D	NC-06	January 3, 1969	4th term	
226	Keith Sebelius	R	KS-01	January 3, 1969	4th term	
227	Louis Stokes	D	OH-21	January 3, 1969	4th term	
228	James W. Symington	D	MO-02	January 3, 1969	4th term	Left the House in 1977.
229	G. William Whitehurst	R	VA-02	January 3, 1969	4th term	
230	Gus Yatron	D	PA-06	January 3, 1969	4th term	
231	Ed Jones	D	TN-07	March 25, 1969	4th term	
232	Dave Obey	D	WI-07	April 1, 1969	4th term	
233	Barry Goldwater, Jr.	R	CA-20	April 29, 1969	4th term	
234	John Melcher	D	MT-02	June 24, 1969	4th term	Left the House in 1977.
235	Michael J. Harrington	D	MA-06	September 30, 1969	4th term	
236	Robert A. Roe	D	NJ-08	November 4, 1969	4th term	
237	Phil Crane	R	IL-12	November 25, 1969	4th term	
238	John H. Rousselot	R	CA-26	June 30, 1970; Previous service, 1961–1963.	5th term*	
239	Charles J. Carney	D	OH-19	November 3, 1970	4th term	
240	Edwin B. Forsythe	R	NJ-06	November 3, 1970	4th term	
241	Bella Abzug	D	NY-20	January 3, 1971	3rd term	Left the House in 1977.
242	Bill Archer	R	TX-07	January 3, 1971	3rd term	
243	Les Aspin	D	WI-01	January 3, 1971	3rd term	
244	Herman Badillo	D	NY-21	January 3, 1971	3rd term	
245	Robert Bergland	D	MN-07	January 3, 1971	3rd term	
246	Goodloe Byron	D	MD-06	January 3, 1971	3rd term	
247	William R. Cotter	D	CT-01	January 3, 1971	3rd term	
248	George E. Danielson	D	CA-30	January 3, 1971	3rd term	
249	Ron Dellums	D	CA-08	January 3, 1971	3rd term	
250	Robert Drinan	D	MA-04	January 3, 1971	3rd term	
251	Bill Frenzel	R	MN-03	January 3, 1971	3rd term	
252	Elwood Hillis	R	IN-05	January 3, 1971	3rd term	
253	Jack Kemp	R	NY-38	January 3, 1971	3rd term	
254	Norman F. Lent	R	NY-04	January 3, 1971	3rd term	
255	Dawson Mathis	D	GA-02	January 3, 1971	3rd term	
256	Romano Mazzoli	D	KY-03	January 3, 1971	3rd term	
257	Ralph Metcalfe	D	IL-01	January 3, 1971	3rd term	
258	Parren Mitchell	D	MD-07	January 3, 1971	3rd term	
259	Morgan F. Murphy	D	IL-02	January 3, 1971	3rd term	
260	Pierre S. du Pont IV	R	DE	January 3, 1971	3rd term	Left the House in 1977.
261	John Y. McCollister	R	NE-02	January 3, 1971	3rd term	Left the House in 1977.
262	K. Gunn McKay	D	UT-01	January 3, 1971	3rd term	
263	Mike McCormack	D	WA-04	January 3, 1971	3rd term	
264	Stewart McKinney	R	CT-04	January 3, 1971	3rd term	
265	Peter A. Peyser	R	NY-23	January 3, 1971	3rd term	Left the House in 1977.
266	Charles B. Rangel	D	NY-19	January 3, 1971	3rd term	
267	J. Kenneth Robinson	R	VA-07	January 3, 1971	3rd term	
268	Teno Roncalio	D	WY	January 3, 1971; Previous service, 1965–1967.	4th term*	
269	J. Edward Roush	D	IN-04	January 3, 1971; Previous service, 1959–1969.	8th term*	Left the House in 1977.
270	Harold L. Runnels	D	NM-02	January 3, 1971	3rd term	
271	Paul Sarbanes	D	MD-03	January 3, 1971	3rd term	Left the House in 1977.
272	John F. Seiberling	D	OH-14	January 3, 1971	3rd term	
273	Floyd Spence	R	SC-02	January 3, 1971	3rd term	
274	James V. Stanton	D	OH-20	January 3, 1971	3rd term	Left the House in 1977.
275	Charles Thone	R	NE-01	January 3, 1971	3rd term	
276	Bill Young	R	FL-06	January 3, 1971	3rd term	
277	Mendel Jackson Davis	D	SC-01	April 27, 1971	3rd term	
278	H. John Heinz III	R	PA-18	November 2, 1971	3rd term	Left the House in 1977.
279	John Breaux	D	LA-07	September 30, 1972	3rd term	
280	M. Caldwell Butler	R	VA-06	November 7, 1972	3rd term	
281	James Abdnor	R	SD-02	January 3, 1973	2nd term	
282	Ike F. Andrews	D	NC-04	January 3, 1973	2nd term	
283	William L. Armstrong	R	CO-05	January 3, 1973	2nd term	
284	Louis A. Bafalis	R	FL-10	January 3, 1973	2nd term	
285	Robin Beard	R	TN-06	January 3, 1973	2nd term	
286	David R. Bowen	D	MS-02	January 3, 1973	2nd term	
287	John B. Breckinridge	D	KY-06	January 3, 1973	2nd term	
288	George Brown, Jr.	D	CA-36	January 3, 1973; Previous service, 1963–1971.	6th term*	
289	Clair Burgener	R	CA-43	January 3, 1973	2nd term	
290	Yvonne B. Burke	D	CA-28	January 3, 1973	2nd term	
291	Thad Cochran	R	MS-04	January 3, 1973	2nd term	
292	William Cohen	R	ME-02	January 3, 1973	2nd term	
293	John Bertrand Conlan	R	AZ-04	January 3, 1973	2nd term	Left the House in 1977.
294	Robert Daniel	R	VA-04	January 3, 1973	2nd term	
295	Benjamin A. Gilman	R	NY-26	January 3, 1973	2nd term	
296	Ronald Ginn	D	GA-01	January 3, 1973	2nd term	
297	Tennyson Guyer	R	OH-04	January 3, 1973	2nd term	
298	Andrew J. Hinshaw	R	CA-40	January 3, 1973	2nd term	Left the House in 1977.
299	Marjorie Holt	R	MD-04	January 3, 1973	2nd term	
300	Elizabeth Holtzman	D	NY-16	January 3, 1973	2nd term	
301	James P. Johnson	R	CO-04	January 3, 1973	2nd term	
302	Barbara Jordan	D	TX-18	January 3, 1973	2nd term	
303	James Robert Jones	D	OK-01	January 3, 1973	2nd term	
304	William M. Ketchum	D	CA-18	January 3, 1973	2nd term	
305	William Lehman	D	FL-13	January 3, 1973	2nd term	
306	Jerry Litton	D	MO-06	January 3, 1973	2nd term	Died on August 3, 1976.
307	Gillis W. Long	D	LA-08	January 3, 1973; Previous service, 1963–1965.	3rd term*	
308	Trent Lott	R	MS-05	January 3, 1973	2nd term	
309	Edward Rell Madigan	R	IL-21	January 3, 1973	2nd term	
310	James G. Martin	R	NC-09	January 3, 1973	2nd term	
311	Edward Mezvinsky	D	IA-01	January 3, 1973	2nd term	Left the House in 1977.
312	Dale Milford	D	TX-24	January 3, 1973	2nd term	
313	Donald J. Mitchell	R	NY-31	January 3, 1973	2nd term	
314	Joe Moakley	D	MA-09	January 3, 1973	2nd term	
315	Carlos Moorhead	R	CA-22	January 3, 1973	2nd term	
316	George M. O'Brien	R	IL-17	January 3, 1973	2nd term	
317	Joel Pritchard	R	WA-01	January 3, 1973	2nd term	
318	Ralph Regula	R	OH-16	January 3, 1973	2nd term	
319	Matthew John Rinaldo	R	NJ-12	January 3, 1973	2nd term	
320	Charlie Rose	D	NC-07	January 3, 1973	2nd term	
321	Leo Ryan	D	CA-11	January 3, 1973	2nd term	
322	Ronald A. Sarasin	R	CT-05	January 3, 1973	2nd term	
323	Patricia Schroeder	D	CO-01	January 3, 1973	2nd term	
324	Bud Shuster	R	PA-09	January 3, 1973	2nd term	
325	Pete Stark	D	CA-09	January 3, 1973	2nd term	
326	Alan Steelman	R	TX-05	January 3, 1973	2nd term	Left the House in 1977.
327	Gerry Studds	D	MA-12	January 3, 1973	2nd term	
328	Steve Symms	R	ID-01	January 3, 1973	2nd term	
329	Gene Taylor	R	MO-07	January 3, 1973	2nd term	
330	Ray Thornton	D	AR-04	January 3, 1973	2nd term	
331	David C. Treen	R	LA-03	January 3, 1973	2nd term	
332	Andrew Young	D	GA-05	January 3, 1973	2nd term	
333	William F. Walsh	R	NY-33	January 3, 1973	2nd term	
334	Charles Wilson	D	TX-02	January 3, 1973	2nd term	
335	Don Young	R	AK	March 6, 1973	2nd term	
336	Lindy Boggs	D	LA-02	March 20, 1973	2nd term	
337	Cardiss Collins	D	IL-07	June 5, 1973	2nd term	
338	Robert Bauman	R	MD-01	August 21, 1973	2nd term	
339	John Murtha	D	PA-12	February 5, 1974	2nd term	
340	Richard Vander Veen	D	MI-05	February 18, 1974	2nd term	Left the House in 1977.
341	Robert J. Lagomarsino	R	CA-19	March 5, 1974	2nd term	
342	J. Bob Traxler	D	MI-08	April 23, 1974	2nd term	
343	John L. Burton	D	CA-05	June 4, 1974	2nd term	
344	Jerome Ambro	D	NY-03	January 3, 1975	1st term	
345	Les AuCoin	D	OR-01	January 3, 1975	1st term	
346	Alvin Baldus	D	WI-03	January 3, 1975	1st term	
347	Max Baucus	D	MT-01	January 3, 1975	1st term	
348	Edward Beard	D	RI-02	January 3, 1975	1st term	
349	Berkley Bedell	D	IA-06	January 3, 1975	1st term	
350	James Blanchard	D	MI-18	January 3, 1975	1st term	
351	Mike Blouin	D	IA-02	January 3, 1975	1st term	
352	Don Bonker	D	WA-03	January 3, 1975	1st term	
353	William M. Brodhead	D	MI-17	January 3, 1975	1st term	
354	Bob Carr	D	MI-06	January 3, 1975	1st term	
355	Robert John Cornell	D	WI-08	January 3, 1975	1st term	
356	Butler Derrick	D	SC-03	January 3, 1975	1st term	
357	Chris Dodd	D	CT-02	January 3, 1975	1st term	
358	Thomas Downey	D	NY-02	January 3, 1975	1st term	
359	Robert B. Duncan	D	OR-03	January 3, 1975; Previous service, 1963–1967.	3rd term*	
360	Norman D'Amours	D	NH-01	January 3, 1975	1st term	
361	Joseph D. Early	D	MA-03	January 3, 1975	1st term	
362	Robert W. Edgar	D	PA-07	January 3, 1975	1st term	
363	David F. Emery	R	ME-01	January 3, 1975	1st term	
364	Glenn English	D	OK-06	January 3, 1975	1st term	
365	David W. Evans	D	IN-06	January 3, 1975	1st term	
366	Millicent Fenwick	R	NJ-05	January 3, 1975	1st term	
367	Joseph L. Fisher	D	VA-10	January 3, 1975	1st term	
368	Floyd Fithian	D	IN-02	January 3, 1975	1st term	
369	James Florio	D	NJ-01	January 3, 1975	1st term	
370	Harold Ford	D	TN-08	January 3, 1975	1st term	
371	Bill Goodling	R	PA-19	January 3, 1975	1st term	
372	Bill Gradison	R	OH-01	January 3, 1975	1st term	
373	Chuck Grassley	R	IA-03	January 3, 1975	1st term	
374	Tom Hagedorn	R	MN-02	January 3, 1975	1st term	
375	Tim Lee Hall	D	IL-15	January 3, 1975	1st term	Left the House in 1977.
376	Mark W. Hannaford	D	CA-34	January 3, 1975	1st term	
377	George V. Hansen	R	ID-02	January 3, 1975; Previous service, 1965–1969.	3rd term*	
378	Tom Harkin	D	IA-05	January 3, 1975	1st term	
379	Herbert Harris	D	VA-08	January 3, 1975	1st term	
380	Philip H. Hayes	D	IN-08	January 3, 1975	1st term	Left the House in 1977.
381	Bill Hefner	D	NC-08	January 3, 1975	1st term	
382	Jack English Hightower	D	TX-13	January 3, 1975	1st term	
383	Kenneth Lamar Holland	D	SC-05	January 3, 1975	1st term	
384	Allan Turner Howe	D	UT-02	January 3, 1975	1st term	Left the House in 1977.
385	Carroll Hubbard	D	KY-01	January 3, 1975	1st term	
386	William Hughes	D	NJ-02	January 3, 1975	1st term	
387	Henry Hyde	R	IL-06	January 3, 1975	1st term	
388	Andrew Jacobs, Jr.	D	IN-11	January 3, 1975; Previous service, 1965–1973.	5th term*	
389	Jim Jeffords	R	VT	January 3, 1975	1st term	
390	John Jenrette	D	SC-06	January 3, 1975	1st term	
391	Bob Kasten	R	WI-09	January 3, 1975	1st term	
392	Richard Kelly	R	FL-05	January 3, 1975	1st term	
393	Martha Elizabeth Keys	D	KS-02	January 3, 1975	1st term	
394	Tom Kindness	R	OH-08	January 3, 1975	1st term	
395	John Hans Krebs	D	CA-17	January 3, 1975	1st term	
396	Bob Krueger	D	TX-21	January 3, 1975	1st term	
397	John LaFalce	D	NY-36	January 3, 1975	1st term	
398	Elliott H. Levitas	D	GA-04	January 3, 1975	1st term	
399	James F. Lloyd	D	CA-35	January 3, 1975	1st term	
400	Marilyn Lloyd	D	TN-03	January 3, 1975	1st term	
401	Andrew Maguire	D	NJ-07	January 3, 1975	1st term	
402	Larry McDonald	D	GA-07	January 3, 1975	1st term	
403	Matthew F. McHugh	D	NY-27	January 3, 1975	1st term	
404	Helen Stevenson Meyner	D	NJ-13	January 3, 1975	1st term	
405	Abner J. Mikva	D	IL-10	January 3, 1975; Previous service, 1969–1973.	3rd term*	
406	George Miller	D	CA-07	January 3, 1975	1st term	
407	Norman Mineta	D	CA-13	January 3, 1975	1st term	
408	Toby Moffett	D	CT-06	January 3, 1975	1st term	
409	Henson Moore	R	LA-06	January 3, 1975	1st term	
410	Ronald M. Mottl	D	OH-23	January 3, 1975	1st term	
411	Gary A. Myers	R	PA-25	January 3, 1975	1st term	
412	Stephen Neal	D	NC-05	January 3, 1975	1st term	
413	Rick Nolan	D	MN-06	January 3, 1975	1st term	
414	Henry J. Nowak	D	NY-37	January 3, 1975	1st term	
415	Jim Oberstar	D	MN-08	January 3, 1975	1st term	
416	Richard Ottinger	D	NY-24	January 3, 1975; Previous service, 1965–1971.	4th term*	
417	Jerry M. Patterson	D	CA-38	January 3, 1975	1st term	
418	Edward W. Pattison	D	NY-29	January 3, 1975	1st term	
419	Larry Pressler	R	SD-01	January 3, 1975	1st term	
420	Fred Richmond	D	NY-14	January 3, 1975	1st term	
421	Ted Risenhoover	D	OK-02	January 3, 1975	1st term	
422	Marty Russo	D	IL-03	January 3, 1975	1st term	
423	James David Santini	D	NV	January 3, 1975	1st term	
424	James H. Scheuer	D	NY-11	January 3, 1975; Previous service, 1965–1973.	5th term*	
425	Richard T. Schulze	R	PA-05	January 3, 1975	1st term	
426	Philip Sharp	D	IN-10	January 3, 1975	1st term	
427	Paul Simon	D	IL-24	January 3, 1975	1st term	
428	Virginia D. Smith	R	NE-03	January 3, 1975	1st term	
429	Stephen J. Solarz	D	NY-13	January 3, 1975	1st term	
430	Gladys Spellman	D	MD-05	January 3, 1975	1st term	
431	Paul Tsongas	D	MA-05	January 3, 1975	1st term	
432	Henry Waxman	D	CA-24	January 3, 1975	1st term	
433	Jim Weaver	D	OR-04	January 3, 1975	1st term	
434	Tim Wirth	D	CO-02	January 3, 1975	1st term	
435	Leo C. Zeferetti	D	NY-15	January 3, 1975	1st term	
	Shirley Neil Pettis	R	CA-37	April 29, 1975	1st term	
	John G. Fary	D	IL-05	July 8, 1975	1st term	
	Clifford Allen	D	TN-05	November 25, 1975	1st term	
	Stan Lundine	D	NY-39	March 2, 1976	1st term	
	Ron Paul	R	TX-22	April 3, 1976	1st term	Left the House in 1977.
	Sam B. Hall, Jr.	D	TX-01	June 19, 1976	1st term	
	Earl Thomas Coleman	R	MO-06	November 2, 1976	1st term	
	Ed Markey	D	MA-07	November 2, 1976	1st term	
	Michael Myers	D	PA-01	November 2, 1976	1st term	

== Delegates ==
Rank	Delegate	Party	District	Seniority date (Previous service, if any)	No.# of term(s)	Notes
1	Walter E. Fauntroy	D	DC	March 23, 1971	3rd term	
2	Jaime Benítez Rexach	D	PR	January 3, 1973	2nd term	
3	Ron de Lugo	D	VI	January 3, 1973	2nd term	
4	Antonio Borja Won Pat	D	GU	January 3, 1973	2nd term	

== See also ==
- 94th United States Congress
- List of United States congressional districts
- List of United States senators in the 94th Congress
