= Frank Gorman =

Frank Gorman may refer to:

- Frank Gorman (Ohio politician) (1917–1997), lawyer and member of the Ohio House of Representatives
- Frank Gorman (diver) (born 1937), American diver
- Frank E. Gorman (1874–1960), Michigan politician
