= Timothy J. DeGeeter =

American lawyer and politician

Tim DeGeeter

Mayor of Parma, Ohio
- Incumbent
- Assumed office January 2012
- Preceded by: Dean DePiero

Member of the Ohio House of Representatives from the 15th district
- In office December 2, 2003 – December 15, 2011
- Preceded by: Dean DePiero
- Succeeded by: Nicholas J. Celebrezze

Personal details
- Born: June 16, 1969 (age 57) South Bend, Indiana
- Party: Democratic
- Education: John Carroll University, Cleveland-Marshall College of Law
- Profession: Attorney

Timothy J. DeGeeter (born June 16, 1969) is an American lawyer and politician who serves as the Mayor of Parma, Ohio.

== Career ==
After being raised in South Bend, Indiana, DeGeeter attended Holy Cross College before transferring to John Carroll University. He obtained a J.D. degree from Cleveland Marshall School of Law, and has been a law director, prosecutor, and in a private law practice. DeGeeter served as a Parma, Ohio City Councilman from 1998 to 2003.

== Ohio House of Representatives ==
When Representative Dean DePiero won election as Mayor of Parma, Ohio, he resigned his House seat, and DeGeeter sought to replace him. In the appointment process, he was up against former Representative Ron Mottl Jr., who had lost to DePiero in 1998, and whose father had been a former Representative and Congressman. In late November, it was announced that a House screening committee had chosen DeGeeter.

In his first election bid to retain his seat, DeGeeter again faced former Representative Mottl Jr. in the 2004 primary, but won overwhelmingly, with 72% of the vote. He went on to win the general election against Michelle Stys handily. He won reelection easily in 2006, 2008 and 2010. He was ineligible to seek reelection in 2012.

After the 2008 election, DeGeeter was mentioned as a potential member of the new Democratic House majority leadership. However, in the end this was not the case. In 2009, Speaker of the House Armond Budish named DeGeeter Chairman of the House Public Utilities Committee. However, when Representative Tyrone Yates resigned, DeGeeter was appointed as Chairman of the Criminal Justice Committee. He was replaced on Public Utilities by Representative Allan Sayre.

DeGeeter was sworn into his final term on January 3, 2011. He is currently serving as ranking member of the Public Utilities Committee, and as a member of the Local Government Committee, and the Transportation, Public Safety and Homeland Security Committee. On January 27, 2011, DeGeeter announced he would run for Mayor of Parma in 2011.
