= List of United States senators in the 92nd Congress =

This is a complete list of United States senators during the 92nd United States Congress listed by seniority from January 3, 1971, to January 3, 1973.

Order of service is based on the commencement of the senator's first term. Behind this is former service as a senator (only giving the senator seniority within their new incoming class), service as vice president, a House member, a cabinet secretary, or a governor of a state. The final factor includes the population of senator's state.

In this congress, the most senior junior senator was J. William Fulbright. The most junior senior senator was William Saxbe.

Senators who were sworn in during the middle of the two-year congressional term (up until the last senator who was not sworn in early after winning the November 1972 election) are listed at the end of the list with no number.

== Terms of service ==
Class	Terms of service of senators that expired in years
Class 2	Terms of service of senators that expired in 1973 (AK, AL, AR, CO, DE, GA, IA, ID, IL, KS, KY, LA, MA, ME, MI, MN, MS, MT, NC, NE, NH, NJ, NM, OK, OR, RI, SC, SD, TN, TX, VA, WV, and WY.)
Class 3	Terms of service of senators that expired in 1975 (AK, AL, AR, AZ, CA, CO, CT, FL, GA, HI, IA, ID, IL, IN, KS, KY, LA, MD, MO, NC, ND, NH, NV, NY, OH, OK, OR, PA, SC, SD, UT, VT, WA, and WI.)
Class 1	Terms of service of senators that expired in 1977 (AZ, CA, CT, DE, FL, HI, IN, MA, MD, ME, MI, MN, MO, MS, MT, ND, NE, NJ, NM, NV, NY, OH, PA, RI, TN, TX, UT, VA, VT, WA, WV, WI, and WY.)

== U.S. Senate seniority list ==
U.S. Senate seniority
Rank	Senator (party-state)	Seniority date	Other factors
1	Richard Russell, Jr. (D-GA)	January 12, 1933	
2	Allen J. Ellender (D-LA)	January 3, 1937	
3	George Aiken (R-VT)	January 10, 1941	
4	James Eastland (D-MS)	January 3, 1943	Previously a senator
5	John Little McClellan (D-AR)	January 3, 1943	
6	Warren G. Magnuson (D-WA)	December 14, 1944	
7	J. William Fulbright (D-AR)	January 3, 1945	
8	Milton Young (R-ND)	March 12, 1945	
9	John Sparkman (D-AL)	November 6, 1946	
10	John C. Stennis (D-MS)	November 17, 1947	
11	Karl Mundt (R-SD)	December 31, 1948	Former representative
12	Russell B. Long (D-LA)	December 31, 1948	
13	Margaret Chase Smith (R-ME)	January 3, 1949	Former representative (8 years, 7 months)
14	Clinton Anderson (D-NM)	January 3, 1949	Former representative (4 years, 5 months)
15	John O. Pastore (D-RI)	December 19, 1950	
16	Wallace F. Bennett (R-UT)	January 3, 1951	
17	Henry M. Jackson (D-WA)	January 3, 1953	Former representative (12 years)
18	Mike Mansfield (D-MT)	January 3, 1953	Former representative (10 years)
19	Stuart Symington (D-MO)	January 3, 1953	
20	Sam Ervin (D-NC)	June 5, 1954	
21	Norris Cotton (R-NH)	November 8, 1954	Former representative (7 years, 10 months)
22	Roman Hruska (R-NE)	November 8, 1954	Former representative (1 year, 10 months)
23	Alan Bible (D-NV)	December 2, 1954	
24	Carl Curtis (R-NE)	January 1, 1955	
25	Clifford P. Case (R-NJ)	January 3, 1955	Former representative
26	Gordon L. Allott (R-CO)	January 3, 1955	
27	John Sherman Cooper (R-KY)	November 7, 1956	Previously a senator (twice) (total tenure 4 years, 4 months)
28	Strom Thurmond (R-SC)	November 7, 1956	Previously a senator (1 year, 3 months)
29	Herman Talmadge (D-GA)	January 3, 1957	Former governor
30	Frank Church (D-ID)	January 3, 1957	
31	Jacob K. Javits (R-NY)	January 9, 1957	
32	William Proxmire (D-WI)	August 28, 1957	
33	Ben Jordan (D-NC)	April 19, 1958	
34	Jennings Randolph (D-WV)	November 5, 1958	
35	Hugh Scott (R-PA)	January 3, 1959	Former representative (18 years)
36	Winston L. Prouty (R-VT)	January 3, 1959	Former representative (8 years)
37	Robert Byrd (D-WV)	January 3, 1959	Former representative (6 years)
38	Harrison A. Williams (D-NJ)	January 3, 1959	Former representative (4 years)
39	Edmund Muskie (D-ME)	January 3, 1959	Former governor
40	Philip Hart (D-MI)	January 3, 1959	Michigan 7th in population (1950)
41	Vance Hartke (D-IN)	January 3, 1959	Indiana 11th in population (1950)
42	Frank Moss (D-UT)	January 3, 1959	Utah 38th in population (1950)
43	Gale W. McGee (D-WY)	January 3, 1959	Wyoming 48th in population (1950)
44	Howard Cannon (D-NV)	January 3, 1959	Nevada 49th in population (1950)
45	Hiram Fong (R-HI)	August 21, 1959	
46	Quentin Northrup Burdick (D-ND)	August 8, 1960	
47	Lee Metcalf (D-MT)	January 3, 1961	Former representative (8 years)
48	James Boggs (R-DE)	January 3, 1961	Former representative (6 years)
49	Jack Miller (R-IA)	January 3, 1961	Iowa 22nd in population (1950)
50	Claiborne Pell (D-RI)	January 3, 1961	Rhode Island 36th in population (1950)
51	John Tower (R-TX)	June 15, 1961	
52	James B. Pearson (R-KS)	January 31, 1962	
53	Len Jordan (R-ID)	August 6, 1962	
54	Ted Kennedy (D-MA)	November 7, 1962	Massachusetts 9th in population (1960)
55	Thomas J. McIntyre (D-NH)	November 7, 1962	New Hampshire 45th in population (1960)
56	Abraham A. Ribicoff (D-CT)	January 3, 1963	Former representative (4 years), former cabinet secretary
57	George McGovern (D-SD)	January 3, 1963	Former representative (4 years) - South Dakota 40th in population (1960)
58	Daniel Inouye (D-HI)	January 3, 1963	Former representative (4 years) - Hawaii 43rd in population (1960)
59	Peter H. Dominick (R-CO)	January 3, 1963	Former representative (2 years)
60	Birch Bayh (D-IN)	January 3, 1963	
61	Gaylord Nelson (D-WI)	January 7, 1963	
62	Joseph Montoya (D-NM)	November 4, 1964	Former representative
63	Fred R. Harris (D-OK)	November 4, 1964	
64	Walter Mondale (D-MN)	December 30, 1964	
65	Paul Fannin (R-AZ)	January 3, 1965	
66	Harry F. Byrd, Jr. (I-VA)	November 12, 1965	
67	Robert P. Griffin (R-MI)	May 11, 1966	
68	Ernest Hollings (D-SC)	November 9, 1966	
69	William B. Spong, Jr. (D-VA)	December 31, 1966	
70	Clifford Hansen (R-WY)	January 3, 1967	Former governor
71	Charles H. Percy (R-IL)	January 3, 1967	Illinois 4th in population (1960)
72	Edward Brooke (R-MA)	January 3, 1967	Massachusetts 9th in population (1960)
73	Howard Baker (R-TN)	January 3, 1967	Tennessee 17th in population (1960)
74	Mark Hatfield (R-OR)	January 10, 1967	
75	Marlow Cook (R-KY)	December 17, 1968	
76	Ted Stevens (R-AK)	December 24, 1968	
77	Thomas Eagleton (D-MO)	December 28, 1968	
78	Barry Goldwater (R-AZ)	January 3, 1969	Previously a senator
79	Richard Schweiker (R-PA)	January 3, 1969	Former representative (8 years) - Pennsylvania 3rd in population (1969)
80	Charles Mathias (R-MD)	January 3, 1969	Former representative (8 years) - Maryland 21st in population (1960)
81	Bob Dole (R-KS)	January 3, 1969	Former representative (8 years) - Kansas 29th in population (1960)
82	Edward J. Gurney (R-FL)	January 3, 1969	Former representative (6 years)
83	Harold Hughes (D-IA)	January 3, 1969	Former governor, Iowa 24th in population (1960)
84	Henry Bellmon (R-OK)	January 3, 1969	Former governor, Oklahoma 27th in population (1960)
85	Alan Cranston (D-CA)	January 3, 1969	California 2nd in population (1960)
86	William B. Saxbe (R-OH)	January 3, 1969	Ohio 5th in population (1960)
87	James Allen (D-AL)	January 3, 1969	Alabama 19th in population (1960)
88	Bob Packwood (R-OR)	January 3, 1969	Oregon 32nd in population (1960)
89	Mike Gravel (D-AK)	January 3, 1969	Alaska 50th in population (1960)
90	Adlai Stevenson III (D-IL)	November 17, 1970	
91	Bill Roth (R-DE)	January 1, 1971	
92	John V. Tunney (D-CA)	January 2, 1971	
93	Hubert Humphrey (D-MN)	January 3, 1971	Previously a senator
94	Robert Taft, Jr. (R-OH)	January 3, 1971	Former representative (8 years) - Ohio 5th in population (1960)
95	Bill Brock (R-TN)	January 3, 1971	Former representative (8 years) - Tennessee 17th in population (1960)
96	Lloyd Bentsen (D-TX)	January 3, 1971	Former representative (6 years)
97	John Glenn Beall, Jr. (R-MD)	January 3, 1971	Former representative (2 years) - Maryland 21st in population (1960)
98	Lowell Weicker (R-CT)	January 3, 1971	Former representative (2 years) - Connecticut 25th in population (1960)
99	James L. Buckley (C/R-NY)	January 3, 1971	New York 1st in population (1960)
100	Lawton Chiles (D-FL)	January 3, 1971	Florida 10th in population (1960)
	David H. Gambrell (D-GA)	February 1, 1971	
	Robert Stafford (R-VT)	September 16, 1971	
	Elaine S. Edwards (D-LA)	August 1, 1972	
	Sam Nunn (D-GA)	November 8, 1972	
	Bennett Johnston Jr. (D-LA)	November 14, 1972	

The senior senators by class were John C. Stennis (D-Mississippi) from Class 1, Richard Russell Jr. (D-Georgia) from Class 2, and George Aiken (R-Vermont) from Class 3. Russell died on January 21, 1971 with Allen J. Ellender (D-Louisiana) became the most senior senator from his class until his death on July 27, 1972, James Eastland (D-Mississippi) became the senior senator from the same class on the second half of the second session. Stennis was the most senior senator from his class while being the junior senator from his state.

== See also ==
- 92nd United States Congress
- List of United States representatives in the 92nd Congress
