= Ken Rocco =

American politician

Member of the Ohio House of Representatives from the 7th district
- In office January 3, 1973 – December 31, 1982
- Preceded by: Leonard Ostrovsky
- Succeeded by: June Kreuzer

Personal details
- Party: Democratic

Ken Rocco is a former member of the Ohio House of Representatives, and a current member of the Cuyahoga County Court of Appeals.

Rocco holds a bachelor's degree from Ohio University and a law degree from Case Western Reserve University. He was Parma City Prosecutor before his election to the state house of Representatives.
