= Dean DePiero =

American politician (born 1968)

Mayor of Parma, Ohio
- In office January 1, 2004 – January 1, 2012
- Preceded by: Gerald M. Boldt
- Succeeded by: Timothy J. DeGeeter

Member of the Ohio House of Representatives from the 20th district
- In office January 5, 1999 – December 2, 2003
- Preceded by: Ron Mottl Jr.
- Succeeded by: Timothy J. DeGeeter

Ward 4 Councilmember, Parma, Ohio
- In office 1995–1998

Personal details
- Born: September 11, 1968 (age 58) Parma, Ohio
- Party: Democratic
- Spouse: Kathleen Cochrane(deceased)
- Education: Ashland University Cleveland Marshall College of Law
- Profession: Lawyer; Politician
- Website: deandepiero.com

Dean DePiero (born September 11, 1968) was the mayor of Parma, Ohio, and a former Cleveland-area member of the Ohio House of Representatives. His wife was WJW reporter Kathleen Cochrane DePiero, who died of illness in 2017.

== Education ==
- Ashland University
- Cleveland Marshall College of Law
