= June Kreuzer =

American politician from Ohio (1944–2024)

Member of the Ohio House of Representatives from the 10th district
- In office January 3, 1983 – December 31, 1986
- Preceded by: Ken Rocco
- Succeeded by: Ron Mottl

Personal details
- Born: June A. March; February 2, 1944
- Died: December 20, 2024 (aged 80)
- Party: Democratic

June A. Kreuzer (née March; February 2, 1944 – December 20, 2024) was an American politician from the state of Ohio. She served as a member of the Parma City School Board from 1977 to 1982, and as a member of the Ohio House of Representatives from 1983 to 1986. Kreuzer was born on February 2, 1944, and died on December 20, 2024, at the age of 80.
