= Leonard Ostrovsky =

American politician

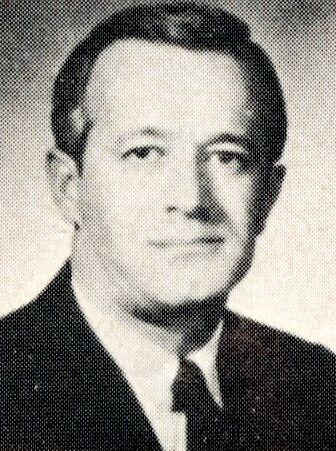

Member of the Ohio House of Representatives from the 55th district
- In office January 3, 1969 – December 31, 1972
- Preceded by: Frank Gorman
- Succeeded by: Ken Rocco

Personal details
- Born: April 28, 1922
- Died: March 1973 (aged 50)
- Party: Democratic

Leonard Ostrovsky (April 28, 1922 – March 1973) was a member of the Ohio House of Representatives.
