= Francis D. Sullivan =

American politician

Member of the Ohio Senate from the 24th district
- In office January 3, 1967 – December 31, 1968
- Preceded by: Districts Created
- Succeeded by: Ron Mottl

Personal details
- Party: Democratic

Francis D. Sullivan is a former member of the Ohio Senate. He served the 24th District, which was based out of Cuyahoga County. He served from 1967 to 1968.
