= Jerome Stano =

American politician

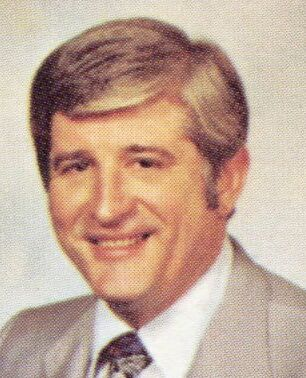

Member of the Ohio Senate from the 24th district
- In office January 3, 1975 – December 31, 1980
- Preceded by: Ron Mottl
- Succeeded by: Gary C. Suhadolnik

Personal details
- Born: September 30, 1932 Cleveland, Ohio, United States
- Died: August 29, 2011 (aged 78) Parma, Ohio, United States
- Party: Democratic

Jerome Paul Stano (September 30, 1932 – August 29, 2011) is a former member of the Ohio Senate. Originally appointed to succeed Ron Mottl who had been elected to Congress in 1974, Stano won a full term in 1976. However, in an upset in 1980, Stano lost to Republican Gary C. Suhadolnik, in a Republican wave that saw Democrats lose control of the upper chamber. Suhadolnik went on to serve in the Senate for over eighteen years.
