= Frank Gorman (Ohio politician) =

American politician and lawyer

Member of the Ohio House of Representatives from the 55th district
- Incumbent
- Assumed office January 3, 1965-December 31, 1968
- Preceded by: None (First)
- Succeeded by: Leonard Ostrovsky

Personal details
- Born: June 13, 1917
- Died: September 11, 1997 (aged 80)
- Party: Democratic

Frank J. Gorman (June 13, 1917 – September 11, 1997) was a lawyer and member of the Ohio House of Representatives from Cuyahoga County. In 1968 he became the Democratic whip. After he left politics he became a judge in the Court of Common Pleas of Cuyahoga County.
