= List of United States senators in the 94th Congress =

This is a complete list of United States senators during the 94th United States Congress listed by seniority from January 3, 1975, to January 3, 1977.

Order of service is based on the commencement of the senator's first term. Behind this is former service as a senator (only giving the senator seniority within their new incoming class), service as vice president, a House member, a cabinet secretary, or a governor of a state. The final factor is the population of the senator's state.

The most senior junior senator in this Congress was John Stennis. The most junior senior senator in this Congress was Floyd Haskell until Robert Taft resigned on December 28, 1976, after which the distinction was held by John Glenn.

Senators who were sworn in during the middle of the two-year congressional term (up until the last senator who was not sworn in early after winning the November 1976 election) are listed at the end of the list with no number.

== Terms of service ==
Class	Terms of service of senators that expired in years
Class 1	Terms of service of senators that expired in 1977 (AZ, CA, CT, DE, FL, HI, IN, MA, MD, ME, MI, MN, MO, MS, MT, ND, NE, NJ, NM, NV, NY, OH, PA, RI, TN, TX, UT, VA, VT, WA, WI, WV, and WY.)
Class 2	Terms of service of senators that expired in 1979 (AK, AL, AR, CO, DE, GA, IA, ID, IL, KS, KY, LA, MA, ME, MI, MN, MS, MT, NC, NE, NH, NJ, NM, OK, OR, RI, SC, SD, TN, TX, VA, WV, and WY.)
Class 3	Terms of service of senators that expired in 1981 (AL, AK, AZ, AR, CA, CO, CT, FL, GA, HI, ID, IL, IN, IA, KS, KY, LA, MD, MO, NC, NH, NV, NY, ND, OH, OK, OR, PA, SC, SD, UT, VT, WA, and WI.)

== U.S. Senate seniority list ==
U.S. Senate seniority
Rank	Senator (party-state)	Seniority date	Other factors
1	James Eastland (D-MS)	January 3, 1943	Previously a senator
2	John Little McClellan (D-AR)	January 3, 1943	
3	Warren G. Magnuson (D-WA)	December 14, 1944	
4	Milton Young (R-ND)	March 12, 1945	
5	John Sparkman (D-AL)	November 6, 1946	
6	John C. Stennis (D-MS)	November 17, 1947	
7	Russell B. Long (D-LA)	December 31, 1948	
8	John O. Pastore (D-RI)	December 19, 1950	
9	Henry M. Jackson (D-WA)	January 3, 1953	Former representative (12 years)
10	Mike Mansfield (D-MT)	January 3, 1953	Former representative (10 years)
11	Stuart Symington (D-MO)	January 3, 1953	
12	Roman Hruska (R-NE)	November 8, 1954	
13	Carl Curtis (R-NE)	January 1, 1955	
14	Clifford P. Case (R-NJ)	January 3, 1955	
15	Strom Thurmond (R-SC)	November 7, 1956	
16	Herman Talmadge (D-GA)	January 3, 1957	Former governor
17	Frank Church (D-ID)	January 3, 1957	
18	Jacob K. Javits (R-NY)	January 9, 1957	
19	William Proxmire (D-WI)	August 28, 1957	
20	Jennings Randolph (D-WV)	November 5, 1958	
21	Hugh Scott (R-PA)	January 3, 1959	Former representative (18 years)
22	Robert Byrd (D-WV)	January 3, 1959	Former representative (6 years)
23	Harrison A. Williams (D-NJ)	January 3, 1959	Former representative (4 years)
24	Edmund Muskie (D-ME)	January 3, 1959	Former governor
25	Philip Hart (D-MI)	January 3, 1959	Michigan 7th in population (1950)
26	Vance Hartke (D-IN)	January 3, 1959	Indiana 11th in population (1950)
27	Frank Moss (D-UT)	January 3, 1959	Utah 38th in population (1950)
28	Gale W. McGee (D-WY)	January 3, 1959	Wyoming 48th in population (1950)
29	Howard Cannon (D-NV)	January 3, 1959	Nevada 49th in population (1950)
30	Hiram Fong (R-HI)	August 21, 1959	
31	Quentin Northrup Burdick (D-ND)	August 8, 1960	
32	Lee Metcalf (D-MT)	January 3, 1961	Former representative
33	Claiborne Pell (D-RI)	January 3, 1961	
34	John Tower (R-TX)	June 15, 1961	
35	James B. Pearson (R-KS)	January 31, 1962	
36	Ted Kennedy (D-MA)	November 7, 1962	Massachusetts 9th in population (1960)
37	Thomas J. McIntyre (D-NH)	November 7, 1962	New Hampshire 45th in population (1960)
38	Abraham A. Ribicoff (D-CT)	January 3, 1963	Former representative (4 years), former cabinet secretary
39	George McGovern (D-SD)	January 3, 1963	Former representative (4 years) - South Dakota 40th in population (1960)
40	Daniel Inouye (D-HI)	January 3, 1963	Former representative (4 years) - Hawaii 43rd in population (1960)
41	Birch Bayh (D-IN)	January 3, 1963	
42	Gaylord Nelson (D-WI)	January 7, 1963	
43	Joseph Montoya (D-NM)	November 4, 1964	
44	Walter Mondale (D-MN)	December 30, 1964	
45	Paul Fannin (R-AZ)	January 3, 1965	
46	Harry F. Byrd, Jr. (I-VA)	November 12, 1965	
47	Robert P. Griffin (R-MI)	May 11, 1966	
48	Ernest Hollings (D-SC)	November 9, 1966	
49	Clifford Hansen (R-WY)	January 3, 1967	Former governor
50	Charles H. Percy (R-IL)	January 3, 1967	Illinois 4th in population (1960)
51	Edward Brooke (R-MA)	January 3, 1967	Massachusetts 9th in population (1960)
52	Howard Baker (R-TN)	January 3, 1967	Tennessee 17th in population (1960)
53	Mark Hatfield (R-OR)	January 10, 1967	
54	Ted Stevens (R-AK)	December 24, 1968	
55	Thomas Eagleton (D-MO)	December 28, 1968	
56	Barry Goldwater (R-AZ)	January 3, 1969	Previously a senator
57	Richard Schweiker (R-PA)	January 3, 1969	Former representative (8 years) - Pennsylvania 3rd in population (1960)
58	Charles Mathias (R-MD)	January 3, 1969	Former representative (8 years) - Maryland 21st in population (1960)
59	Bob Dole (R-KS)	January 3, 1969	Former representative (8 years) - Kansas 29th in population (1960)
60	Henry Bellmon (R-OK)	January 3, 1969	Former governor
61	Alan Cranston (D-CA)	January 3, 1969	California 2nd in population (1960)
62	James Allen (D-AL)	January 3, 1969	Alabama 19th in population (1960)
63	Bob Packwood (R-OR)	January 3, 1969	Oregon 32nd in population (1960)
64	Mike Gravel (D-AK)	January 3, 1969	Alaska 50th in population (1960)
65	Adlai Stevenson III (D-IL)	November 17, 1970	
66	Bill Roth (R-DE)	January 1, 1971	
67	John V. Tunney (D-CA)	January 2, 1971	
68	Hubert Humphrey (D-MN)	January 3, 1971	Previously a senator
69	Robert Taft, Jr. (R-OH)	January 3, 1971	Former representative (8 years) - Ohio 5th in population (1960)
70	Bill Brock (R-TN)	January 3, 1971	Former representative (8 years) - Tennessee 17th in population (1960)
71	Lloyd Bentsen (D-TX)	January 3, 1971	Former representative (6 years)
72	John Glenn Beall, Jr. (R-MD)	January 3, 1971	Former representative (2 years) - Maryland 21st in population (1960)
73	Lowell Weicker (R-CT)	January 3, 1971	Former representative (2 years) - Connecticut 25th in population (1960)
74	James L. Buckley (C/R-NY)	January 3, 1971	New York 1st in population (1960)
75	Lawton Chiles (D-FL)	January 3, 1971	Florida 10th in population (1960)
76	Robert Stafford (R-VT)	September 16, 1971	
77	Sam Nunn (D-GA)	November 8, 1972	
78	Bennett Johnston Jr. (D-LA)	November 14, 1972	
79	William Hathaway (D-ME)	January 3, 1973	Former representative (8 years)
80	William L. Scott (R-VA)	January 3, 1973	Former representative (6 years)
81	James A. McClure (R-ID)	January 3, 1973	Former representative (4 years)
82	James Abourezk (D-SD)	January 3, 1973	Former representative (2 years)
83	Dewey F. Bartlett (R-OK)	January 3, 1973	Former governor
84	Jesse Helms (R-NC)	January 3, 1973	North Carolina 12th in population (1970)
85	Walter Huddleston (D-KY)	January 3, 1973	Kentucky 23rd in population (1970)
86	Richard C. Clark (D-IA)	January 3, 1973	Iowa 25th in population (1970)
87	Floyd K. Haskell (D-CO)	January 3, 1973	Colorado 30th in population (1970)
88	Pete Domenici (R-NM)	January 3, 1973	New Mexico 37th in population (1970)
89	Joe Biden (D-DE)	January 3, 1973	Delaware 46th in population (1970)
90	Paul Laxalt (R-NV)	December 18, 1974	
91	Jake Garn (R-UT)	December 21, 1974	
92	John Glenn (D-OH)	December 24, 1974	
93	Wendell H. Ford (D-KY)	December 28, 1974	
94	Richard Stone (D-FL)	January 1, 1975	
95	John Culver (D-IA)	January 3, 1975	Former representative
96	Dale Bumpers (D-AR)	January 3, 1975	Former governor
97	Robert Burren Morgan (D-NC)	January 3, 1975	North Carolina 12th in population (1970)
98	Gary Hart (D-CO)	January 3, 1975	Colorado 30th in population (1970)
99	Patrick Leahy (D-VT)	January 3, 1975	Vermont 48th in population (1970)
100	Norris Cotton (R-NH)	August 8, 1975	
	John Durkin (D-NH)	September 18, 1975	
	John Danforth (R-MO)	December 27, 1976	
	Edward Zorinsky (D-NE)	December 28, 1976	
	Howard Metzenbaum (D-OH)	December 29, 1976	Previously a senator
	John Chafee (R-RI)	December 29, 1976	
	Donald W. Riegle, Jr. (D-MI)	December 30, 1976	Former representative
	Wendell Anderson (D-MN)	December 30, 1976	
	Samuel Hayakawa (R-CA)	January 2, 1977	

The most senior senators by class were John C. Stennis (D-Mississippi) from Class 1, James Eastland (D-Mississippi) from Class 2, and Warren G. Magnuson (D-Washington) from Class 3. Stennis was the most senior senator from his class while being the junior senator from his state.

== See also ==
- 94th United States Congress
- List of United States representatives in the 94th Congress
