= Frank J. Brasco =

American politician

Frank Brasco
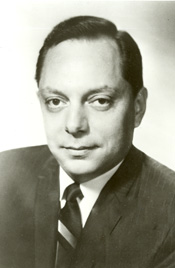

Member of the U.S. House of Representatives from New York's 11th district
- In office January 3, 1967 – January 3, 1975
- Preceded by: Eugene J. Keogh
- Succeeded by: James H. Scheuer

Personal details
- Born: Frank James Brasco; October 15, 1932 New York City, New York, U.S.
- Died: October 19, 1998 (aged 66)
- Party: Democratic
- Education: Brooklyn College (BA); Brooklyn Law School (LLB)

Frank James Brasco (October 15, 1932 – October 19, 1998) was an American politician who served four terms as a Democratic member of the United States House of Representatives from New York from 1967 to 1975.

== Biography ==
Brasco was born in Brooklyn, New York. He graduated High School and received a B.A. from Brooklyn College in 1955; and an LLB from Brooklyn Law School in 1957. He was also a member of the United States Army Reserve.

== Political career ==
After serving as assistant district attorney for Kings County, New York, Brasco was elected to Congress in 1966 and served four terms from January 3, 1967, until January 3, 1975.

== Legal issues ==
Brasco was indicted in 1973, along with his uncle, Joseph Brasco, on federal bribery and conspiracy charges, over payoffs he received from a Mafia-owned Bronx trucking company which was seeking mail hauling contracts from the US Post Office. The first trial led to a hung jury. He was subsequently convicted and sentenced to five years in prison, with all but three months suspended. He was also fined and disbarred. He did not run for re-election in 1974.

As a result of the preceding investigation into corruption allegations by the United States Department of Justice he crossed party lines to vote against allowing the House Banking Committee under Wright Patman to subpoena members of the Nixon administration for suspected Federal Election Campaign Act violations. Brasco's vote was considered surprising because of his liberal record and strong opposition to Richard Nixon. Governor Nelson Rockefeller arranged a meeting between Brasco and John N. Mitchell in which he promised to oppose an investigation in exchange for leniency. As a result of the decision the Watergate scandal would not be exposed until after the 1972 presidential election.

== Death ==
Brasco died on October 19, 1998 (aged 66 years and 4 days).

== See also ==
- List of American federal politicians convicted of crimes
- List of federal political scandals in the United States
- Politics of New York (state)

U.S. House of Representatives
Preceded by Eugene J. Keogh	Member of the U.S. House of Representatives from New York's 11th congressional district 1967–1975	Succeeded by James H. Scheuer
