= William E. Minshall =

American lawyer and politician (1911–1990)

William Edwin Minshall Jr.
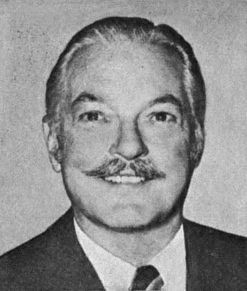
- Official portrait, 1973

Member of the U.S. House of Representatives from Ohio's 23rd district
- In office January 3, 1955 – December 31, 1974
- Preceded by: George H. Bender
- Succeeded by: Ronald M. Mottl

Member of the Ohio House of Representatives
- In office 1939–1940

Personal details
- Born: October 24, 1911 East Cleveland, Ohio
- Died: October 15, 1990 (aged 78) Delray Beach, Florida
- Party: Republican
- Education: University of Virginia; Cleveland-Marshall College of Law

William Edwin Minshall Jr. (October 24, 1911 – October 15, 1990) was an American lawyer and politician who served ten terms as a Republican member of the United States House of Representatives from Ohio from 1955 to 1974.

== Early life and career ==
William E. Minshall Jr. was born in East Cleveland, Ohio, to William E. Minshall and Mabel Rice. Minshall came from a family of lawyers with his father being a trial lawyer. His grandfather, Thaddeus A. Minshall, who prior to becoming an Ohio Supreme Court judge, had a private practice in law.

Minshall attended the public schools of East Cleveland, the University School in Shaker Heights, Ohio, and the University of Virginia at Charlottesville, Virginia, where he was a member of Chi Phi fraternity. He graduated from the Cleveland Law School in 1940, was admitted to the bar the same year, and commenced the practice of law in Cleveland, Ohio. He was a member of the Ohio House of Representatives in 1939 and 1940.

== World War II ==
Minshall Jr. enlisted in December 1940 as a private in the United States Army and served in the European Theater, G-2 section, Headquarters III Corps, and was discharged as a lieutenant colonel in March 1946. He was awarded a Bronze Star.

== Career ==
Minshall was special assistant attorney general of Ohio from 1948 to 1952 and general counsel for the U.S. Maritime Administration of Washington, D.C., in 1953 and 1954.

Minshall was elected as a Republican to the 84th Congress and to the nine succeeding Congresses and served until his resignation December 31, 1974. He voted in favor of the Civil Rights Acts of 1957, 1964 and 1968, and the Voting Rights Act of 1965, while voting present on the Civil Rights Act of 1960. He was not a candidate for reelection in 1974 to the 94th Congress.

== Death ==
Minshall was a resident of Delray Beach, Florida, until his death on October 15, 1990.

U.S. House of Representatives
Preceded by George H. Bender	Member of the U.S. House of Representatives from Ohio's 23rd congressional district 1955–1974	Succeeded by Ronald M. Mottl
