= Ron Mottl Jr. =

American politician

Member of the Ohio House of Representatives from the 20th district
- In office February 5, 1997 – December 31, 1998
- Preceded by: Ron Mottl
- Succeeded by: Dean DePiero

Personal details
- Born: 1962 (age 63–64)
- Party: Democratic

Ron Mottl Jr. (born 1962) is an American Democratic politician. He served as a member of the Ohio House of Representatives from 1997 to 1998, succeeding his father, Ron Mottl.
