= James H. Scheuer =

American politician (1920–2005)

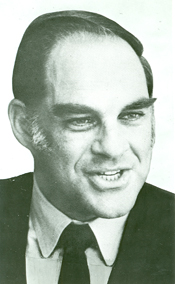

Member of the U.S. House of Representatives from New York
- In office January 3, 1975 – January 3, 1993
- Preceded by: Frank J. Brasco
- Succeeded by: Jerry Nadler (redistricting)
- Constituency: 11th district (1975–83); 8th district (1983–93)
- In office January 3, 1965 – January 3, 1973
- Preceded by: James C. Healey
- Succeeded by: Herman Badillo (redistricting)
- Constituency: 21st district

Personal details
- Born: James Haas Scheuer; February 6, 1920 New York City, New York, U.S.
- Died: August 30, 2005 (aged 85) Washington, D.C., U.S.
- Party: Democratic; Liberal
- Spouse: Emily Malino
- Children: 4

James Haas Scheuer (/ʃɔɪər/ SHOY-er) (February 6, 1920 – August 30, 2005) was an American lawyer and military veteran who served as a Democratic Party member of the United States House of Representatives from New York. He was also affiliated with the Liberal Party of New York.

== Family and education ==
Scheuer was born and raised in New York City, where he attended the Ethical Culture Fieldston School. He received a bachelor's degree from Swarthmore College in 1942, a master's degree from Harvard Business School in 1943, and a law degree from Columbia University Law School in 1948.

His brothers were Richard J. Scheuer, a scholar and philanthropist, Walter Scheuer, an investor and documentary-maker, and Steven H. Scheuer, a television and film critic. His sister is Amy Scheuer Cohen of Larchmont, NY. He was married in 1948 to interior designer Emily Malino (1925–2007) and had four children. Scheuer contracted polio while on his honeymoon, and recuperated for a year at President Franklin D. Roosevelt's Warm Springs facility in Georgia. He walked with a cane for the rest of his life.

== Early career ==
Scheuer served in the United States Army from 1943 until 1945. After returning home, he was hired by the Foreign Economic Administration, and in 1951 he became employed by the Office of Price Stabilization.

== Congress ==
After an unsuccessful run for the House in 1962, Scheuer was elected to Congress in 1964. He originally served from January 3, 1965, until January 3, 1973. He also headed the National Housing Conference.

Scheuer was an early and outspoken opponent of the Vietnam War and opposed governmental interference in private matters such as contraception and abortion. A strong liberal, he supported legislation for the Head Start early education program, environmental protection and automotive safety. He also was a staunch supporter of Israel and the cause of Soviet Jews. He introduced a bill (HR 10638) to "provide for the establishment of the Negro History Museum Commission." He was "the first high-ranking American official to meet with refuseniks" and in 1972 was detained and then expelled from the Soviet Union for meeting with Jews who were trying to emigrate from that country.

Scheuer ran for Mayor of New York City in 1969, but finished last in a field of five in the Democratic primary.

=== Defeat and return to office ===
Population loss in the Bronx and redistricting in 1970 and again in 1972 pitted Scheuer against two other incumbent Congressmen in succession. In 1970 he defeated Representative Jacob H. Gilbert, but two years later he was defeated by Representative Jonathan Bingham.

Scheuer ran for Congress once again in 1974, moving to Neponsit, Queens in a different New York City district to succeed retiring Democrat Frank J. Brasco, who represented parts of south Queens and Brooklyn. He served his second stint as Representative from January 3, 1975, until January 3, 1993. In the 1980 Census his district was once again eliminated and he again moved to an open seat, this time based in Northeast Queens.

== Later life ==
Following his retirement, he served as the United States Director of the European Bank for Reconstruction and Development from 1994 until 1996.

Scheuer died of heart and kidney failure at age 85.

== See also ==
- List of Jewish members of the United States Congress

U.S. House of Representatives
Preceded by James C. Healey	Member of the U.S. House of Representatives from New York's 21st congressional district 1965–1973	Succeeded by Jonathan B. Bingham
Preceded by Frank J. Brasco	Member of the U.S. House of Representatives from New York's 11th congressional district 1975–1983	Succeeded by Edolphus Towns
Preceded by Benjamin S. Rosenthal	Member of the U.S. House of Representatives from New York's 8th congressional district 1983–1993	Succeeded by Jerry Nadler
