= Ohio's 23rd congressional district =

Defunct U.S. Congress electoral division

Coordinates: 41°25′N 81°45′W

- Obsolete district
- Created: 1950
- Eliminated: 1980
- Years active: 1953-1983

The 23rd congressional district of Ohio was eliminated as a result of the redistricting cycle after the 1980 census. The district had been created after the elimination of Ohio's at-large congressional district after the 1950 election.

In its last decade, the district consisted of western and southern Cuyahoga county.

== List of members representing the district ==
Member	Party	Year(s)	Cong ress	Electoral history
District established January 3, 1953
George H. Bender (Chagrin Falls)	Republican	January 3, 1953 – December 15, 1954	83rd	Redistricted from the at-large district and re-elected in 1952. Resigned when elected U.S. Senator.
Vacant		December 15, 1954 – January 3, 1955	83rd	
William Edwin Minshall Jr. (Lakewood)	Republican	January 3, 1955 – December 31, 1974	84th 85th 86th 87th 88th 89th 90th 91st 92nd 93rd	Elected in 1954. Re-elected in 1956. Re-elected in 1958. Re-elected in 1960. Re-elected in 1962. Re-elected in 1964. Re-elected in 1966. Re-elected in 1968. Re-elected in 1970. Re-elected in 1972. Resigned.
Vacant		December 31, 1974 – January 3, 1975	93rd	
Ronald M. Mottl (Parma)	Democratic	January 3, 1975 – January 3, 1983	94th 95th 96th 97th	Elected in 1974. Re-elected in 1976. Re-elected in 1978. Re-elected in 1980. Redistricted to the 19th district and lost renomination.
District dissolved since January 3, 1983

== Election results ==
Year	Democratic	Republican	Other
1952	Michael P. O'Brien: 47,090	√ George H. Bender (inc.)*: 85,752	
1954	Bernice S. Pyke: 33,639	√ William E. Minshall: 69,994	
1956	George A. Hurley: 46,247	√ William E. Minshall Jr. (inc.): 102,707	
1958	Daniel Winston: 95,267	√ William E. Minshall Jr. (inc.): 47,953	
1960	Daniel Winston: 59,893	√ William E. Minshall Jr. (inc.): 123,364	
1962	Emil C. Weber: 42,907	√ William E. Minshall Jr. (inc.): 107,510	
1964	Norbert G. Dennerll Jr.: 64,162	√ William E. Minshall Jr. (inc.): 131,554	
1966	Sheldon D. Clark: 37,489	√ William E. Minshall Jr. (inc.): 102,513	
1968	James V. Stanton: 98,825	√ William E. Minshall Jr. (inc.): 106,852	
1970	Ronald M. Mottl: 73,765	√ William E. Minshall Jr. (inc.): 111,218	
1972	Dennis J. Kucinich: 94,366	√ William E. Minshall Jr. (inc.): 98,594	Frederick D. Lyon (AI): 2,976; John O'Neill (SL): 3,615
1974	√ Ronald M. Mottl (inc.): 53,338	George E. Mastics: 46,810	Arthur L. Cain: 2,005; Bohdan A. Futey: 2,655; Hugh J. Gallagher: 3,461; Dennis J. Kucinich: 45,186
1976	√ Ronald M. Mottl (inc.): 130,576	Michael T. Scanlon: 47,804	
1978	√ Ronald M. Mottl (inc.): 99,975	Homer S. Taft: 33,732	
1980	√ Ronald M. Mottl (inc.)*: 144,371		
