= Ronald M. Mottl =

American lawyer and politician (1934–2023)

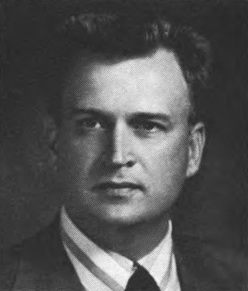
- Official portrait, 1981

Member of the Ohio House of Representatives from the 20th district
- In office January 3, 1987 – February 5, 1997
- Preceded by: June Kreuzer
- Succeeded by: Ron Mottl Jr.

Member of the U.S. House of Representatives from Ohio's 23rd district
- In office January 3, 1975 – January 3, 1983
- Preceded by: William Edwin Minshall, Jr.
- Succeeded by: District eliminated

Member of the Ohio Senate from the 24th district
- In office January 3, 1969 – December 31, 1974
- Preceded by: Francis D. Sullivan
- Succeeded by: Jerome Stano
- In office January 3, 1967 – December 31, 1968
- Preceded by: At-Large
- Succeeded by: Gertrude Polcar

Member of the Parma City Council
- In office 1960–1966

Personal details
- Born: Ronald Milton Mottl; February 6, 1934 Cleveland, Ohio, U.S.
- Died: October 13, 2023 (aged 89)
- Party: Democratic
- Spouse: Debra
- Children: 4
- Education: University of Notre Dame (BS, JD)

Military service
- Branch/service: United States Army
- Years of service: 1957

Ronald Milton Mottl (February 6, 1934 – October 13, 2023) was an American lawyer and politician who served in the Ohio General Assembly for multiple decades. A member of the Democratic Party, he previously served four terms in the United States House of Representatives from 1975 to 1983.

== Early life ==
Ronald Milton Mottl was born in Cleveland, Ohio, to Miroslav Václav Josef Mottl and Anna Hummel, a couple of Czech descent. His father, an immigrant from Počaply, died from chronic valvular heart disease when he was 11. His mother, born in Pittsburgh to parents from Kvaň and Mýto, remarried to Václav Schovánek from Kladno. Mottl graduated from Parma Schaaf High School in 1952 and later was inducted into the school’s athletic hall of fame.

=== College and military service ===
He attended the University of Notre Dame for which he played baseball in 1955. He served in the United States Army Reserves in 1957.

== Career ==
Mottl was a lawyer, and served on the city council of Parma, Ohio from 1960 to 1966 and the Ohio state legislature from 1967 until 1975.

=== Congress ===
Mottl served four terms in the U.S. House of Representatives from 1975 to 1983. A conservative Democrat, Mottl was an ally of Ronald Reagan's legislative agenda. In 1982, Mottl lost the Democratic primary to Ed Feighan, thereby losing his seat.

=== Return to state legislature ===
Mottl returned to local politics, serving on the Parma school board from 1985 until 1986, and as president of the school board in 1986, until he was elected to the Ohio House of Representatives, where he served until 1997. He was also an unsuccessful candidate for mayor of North Royalton, Ohio in 1999.

== Personal life ==
Mottl had four children. Ronald Jr. and a daughter are from his first marriage and a son and daughter are from his second marriage to Debbie. Ron Jr. was a representative in the Ohio House of Representatives for one term from 1997 to 1998 immediately succeeding his father.

== Death ==
Mottl died on October 13, 2023, at the age of 89.

== See also ==
- List of United States representatives from Ohio

U.S. House of Representatives
| Preceded by William Edwin Minshall, Jr. | Member of the U.S. House of Representatives from Ohio's 23rd congressional district 1975–1983 | Succeeded by District eliminated |
