= 2004 United States House of Representatives elections =

House elections for the 109th U.S. Congress

- November 2, 2004

All 435 seats in the United States House of Representatives (Note: As well as the 5 non-voting delegates.) 218 seats needed for a majority
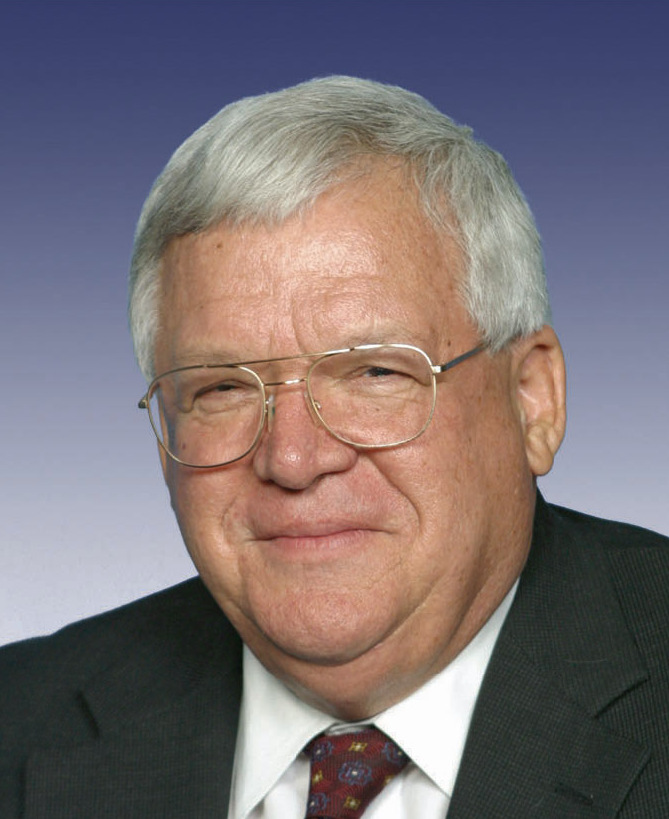

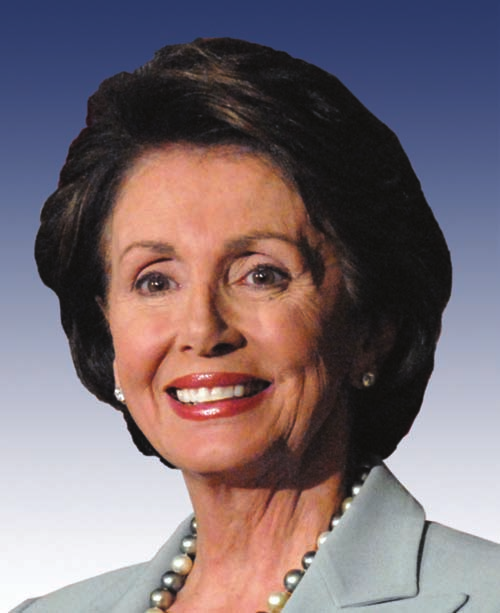
	Majority party	Minority party
Leader	Dennis Hastert	Nancy Pelosi
Party	Republican	Democratic
Leader since	January 3, 1999	January 3, 2003
Leader's seat	Illinois 14th	California 8th
Last election	229 seats, 50.0%	204 seats, 45.2%
Seats before	229	205
Seats won	232	202
Seat change	▲3	▼3
Popular vote	55,958,144	52,969,786
Percentage	49.4%	46.8%
Swing	▼0.6pp	▲1.6pp
	Third party
Party	Independent
Last election	1 seat
Seats won	1
Seat change	Steady
Popular vote	674,202
Percentage	0.6%
Swing	▲0.1pp
- Results: Democratic hold Democratic gain Republican hold Republican gain Independent hold
Speaker before election
Dennis Hastert
Republican
Elected Speaker
Dennis Hastert
Republican

The 2004 United States House of Representatives elections were held on November 2, 2004, to elect all 435 seats of the chamber. It coincided with the re-election of President George W. Bush as well as many Senate elections and gubernatorial elections. Prior to the election in the 108th Congress, Republicans held 227 seats, Democrats held 205, with two Republican vacancies and one independent. As a result of this election, the 109th Congress began composed of 232 Republicans, 201 Democrats, one independent (who caucuses with the Democrats), and one vacancy (Democrat Bob Matsui won reelection but died just two days before the beginning of the 109th Congress).

Democrats won open seats in Colorado, South Dakota, and New York while ousting incumbents in Georgia and Illinois. Republicans won an open seat in Kentucky while ousting an incumbent in Indiana. They gained five seats in Texas after a controversial mid-decade redistricting placed several rural Democratic incumbents into new districts. Two seats in Louisiana swapped party control.

As of 2025, this is the last election in which someone who was not from the Democratic or Republican parties was elected to the House (Independent Bernie Sanders). Republicans would not make consecutive net gains in the House (after gaining seats in the 2002 election) until 2020 and 2022. This was also the last election in which the Republicans made any gains in a presidential election year until 2020.

== Results ==
=== Federal ===
↓
202	1	232
Democratic	I	Republican

Summary of the 2004 United States House of Representatives elections results
Parties	Seats				Popular vote		
Parties	2002	2004	Net change	Strength	Vote	%	Change
Republican Party	229	232	▲3	53.3%	55,958,144	49.4%	-0.6%
Democratic Party	205	202	▼3	46.4%	52,969,786	46.8%	+1.6%
Libertarian Party	—	—	—	—	1,056,844	0.9%	-0.5%
Independent	1	1	0	0.2%	674,202	0.6%	+0.1%
Green Party	—	—	—	—	344,549	0.3%	-0.1%
Constitution Party	—	—	—	—	187,006	0.2%	-
Reform Party	—	—	—	—	85,539	0.1%	+0.1%
Independence Party	—	—	—	—	76,053	0.1%	+0.1%
Others	—	—	—	—	1,840,163	1.6%	-0.6%
Total	434	435	0	100.0%	113,192,286	100.0%	–
Source: Election Statistics - Office of the Clerk

Popular vote
Republican	49.44%
Democratic	46.80%
Libertarian	0.93%
Green	0.30%
Others	2.53%

House seats
Republican	53.33%
Democratic	46.44%
Independent	0.23%

=== Maps ===
Winner's share of the vote

Popular vote by states

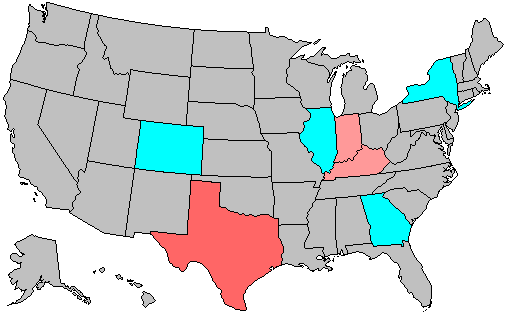
Summary of party change of U.S. House seats in the 2004 House election
1–2 Democratic seat pickup
1–2 Republican seat pickup
3–5 Republican seat pickup

== Retirements ==
Retiring incumbents by district Democratic incumbent ran Democratic incumbent retired or lost renomination Republican incumbent ran Republican incumbent retired Democratic and Republican incumbent ran Independent incumbent ran Vacant or new district

In the November general elections, thirty incumbents did not seek re-election, either to retire or to seek other positions.

=== Democrats ===
Thirteen Democrats did not seek re-election.

1. California 20: Cal Dooley retired.
2. Florida 20: Peter Deutsch retired to run for U.S. Senator.
3. Georgia 4: Denise Majette retired to run for U.S. Senator.
4. Illinois 3: Bill Lipinski retired.
5. Kentucky 4: Ken Lucas retired.
6. Louisiana 7: Chris John retired to run for U.S. Senator.
7. Missouri 3: Dick Gephardt retired to run for U.S. president.
8. Missouri 5: Karen McCarthy retired.
9. Oklahoma 2: Brad Carson retired to run for U.S. Senator.
10. Pennsylvania 13: Joe Hoeffel retired to run for U.S. Senator.
11. Puerto Rico at-large: Aníbal Acevedo Vilá retired to run for Governor of Puerto Rico.
12. Texas 8: Jim Turner retired when redistricted from the 2nd district.
13. Wisconsin 4: Jerry Kleczka retired.

=== Republicans ===
Seventeen Republicans did not seek re-election.

1. California 3: Doug Ose retired.
2. Colorado 3: Scott McInnis retired.
3. Georgia 6: Johnny Isakson retired to run for U.S. Senator.
4. Georgia 8: Mac Collins retired to run for U.S. Senator.
5. Louisiana 1: David Vitter retired to run for U.S. Senator.
6. Louisiana 3: Billy Tauzin retired.
7. Michigan 7: Nick Smith retired.
8. New York 27: Jack Quinn retired.
9. New York 29: Amo Houghton retired.
10. North Carolina 5: Richard Burr retired to run for U.S. Senator.
11. North Carolina 10: Cass Ballenger retired.
12. Pennsylvania 8: Jim Greenwood retired.
13. Pennsylvania 15: Pat Toomey retired to run for U.S. Senator.
14. South Carolina 4: Jim DeMint retired to run for U.S. Senator.
15. Virginia 2: Ed Schrock retired.
16. Washington 5: George Nethercutt retired to run for U.S. Senator.
17. Washington 8: Jennifer Dunn retired.

== Resignations ==
Two seats opened early due to resignations and were not filled until the November elections.

=== Democrats ===
No Democrats resigned.

=== Republicans ===
Two Republicans resigned.

1. Florida 14: Porter Goss resigned September 23, 2004 to become Director of the Central Intelligence Agency.
2. Nebraska 1: Doug Bereuter resigned August 31, 2004 to become president of The Asia Foundation.

== Incumbents defeated ==
=== In primary elections ===
==== Democrats ====
Two Democrats lost renomination.

1. Texas 9: Chris Bell lost to Al Green, who won the general election.
2. Texas 28: Ciro Rodriguez lost to Henry Cuellar, who won the general election.

==== Republicans ====
No Republicans lost renomination. This was the first time this had occurred since 1984.

=== In the general election ===
==== Democrats ====
Five Democrats lost re-election to Republicans.

1. Indiana 9: Baron Hill lost to Mike Sodrel.
2. Texas 1: Max Sandlin lost to Louie Gohmert.
3. Texas 2: Nick Lampson lost to Ted Poe.
4. Texas 19: Charles Stenholm lost a redistricting race to Randy Neugebauer.
5. Texas 32: Martin Frost lost a redistricting race to Pete Sessions.

==== Republicans ====
Two Republicans lost re-election to Democrats.

1. Georgia 12: Max Burns lost to John Barrow.
2. Illinois 8: Phil Crane lost to Melissa Bean.

== Open seats that changed parties ==
=== Democratic seats won by Republicans ===
Three Democratic seats were won by Republicans.

1. Kentucky 4: Won by Geoff Davis.
2. Louisiana 7: Won by Charles Boustany.
3. Puerto Rico at-large: Won by Luis Fortuño.

=== Republican seats won by Democrats ===
Three Republican seats were won by Democrats.

1. Colorado 3: Won by John Salazar.
2. Louisiana 3: Won by Charlie Melançon.
3. New York 27: Won by Brian Higgins.

== Open seats that parties held ==
=== Democratic seats held by Democrats ===
Democrats held nine of their open seats.

1. California 20: Won by Jim Costa.
2. Florida 20: Won by Debbie Wasserman Schultz.
3. Georgia 4: Won by Cynthia McKinney.
4. Illinois 3: Won by Dan Lipinski.
5. Missouri 3: Won by Russ Carnahan.
6. Missouri 5: Won by Emanuel Cleaver.
7. Oklahoma 2: Won by Dan Boren.
8. Pennsylvania 13: Won by Allyson Schwartz.
9. Wisconsin 4: Won by Gwen Moore.

=== Republican seats held by Republicans ===
Republicans held sixteen of their open seats.

1. California 3: Won by Dan Lungren.
2. Florida 14: Won by Connie Mack IV.
3. Georgia 6: Won by Tom Price.
4. Georgia 8: Won by Lynn Westmoreland.
5. Louisiana 1: Won by Bobby Jindal.
6. Michigan 7: Won by Joe Schwarz.
7. Nebraska 1: Won by Jeff Fortenberry.
8. New York 29: Won by Randy Kuhl.
9. North Carolina 5: Won by Virginia Foxx.
10. North Carolina 10: Won by Patrick McHenry.
11. Pennsylvania 8: Won by Mike Fitzpatrick.
12. Pennsylvania 15: Won by Charlie Dent.
13. South Carolina 4: Won by Bob Inglis.
14. Virginia 2: Won by Thelma Drake.
15. Washington 5: Won by Cathy McMorris.
16. Washington 8: Won by Dave Reichert.

== Newly created seats ==
Of the thirty-two seats created in the 2003 Texas redistricting, three had no incumbent representative.

=== Democratic gain ===
No Democrats were elected in newly created seats.

=== Republican gain ===
Three Republicans were elected in newly created seats.

1. Texas 10: Won by Michael McCaul.
2. Texas 11: Won by Mike Conaway.
3. Texas 24: Won by Kenny Marchant.

== Closest races ==
Twenty-three races were decided by 10% or lower.

District	Winner	Margin
Indiana 9th	Republican (flip)	0.49%
Louisiana 3rd	Democratic (flip)	0.50%
New York 27th	Democratic (flip)	1.33%
Pennsylvania 6th	Republican	2.02%
Illinois 8th	Democratic (flip)	3.39%
Georgia 12th	Democratic (flip)	3.62%
Texas 17th	Democratic	3.78%
Colorado 3rd	Democratic (flip)	3.99%
Connecticut 4th	Republican	4.68%
Washington 8th	Republican	4.80%
Colorado 4th	Republican	6.27%
California 20th	Democratic	6.80%
South Dakota at-large	Democratic	7.45%
Missouri 3rd	Democratic	7.72%
Minnesota 6th	Democratic	8.05%
Connecticut 2nd	Republican	8.36%
Oregon 5th	Democratic	8.53%
Indiana 8th	Republican	8.82%
New Mexico 1st	Republican	8.87%
Indiana 2nd	Republican	9.63%
North Carolina 11th	Republican	9.80%
New York 29th	Republican	9.86%
Louisiana 7th	Republican (flip)	9.92%

== Special elections ==
There were three special elections held in 2004, all of them separate from the November elections.

District	Incumbent			This race	
District	Member	Party	First elected	Results	Candidates
Kentucky 6	Ernie Fletcher	Republican	1998	Incumbent resigned December 8, 2003 to become Governor of Kentucky. New member elected February 17, 2004. Democratic gain. Winner was subsequently re-elected in November, see below.	▌ ✓ Ben Chandler (Democratic) 55.16%; ▌Alice Forgy Kerr (Republican) 42.91%; ▌Mark Gailey (Libertarian) 1.94%
South Dakota at-large	Bill Janklow	Republican	2002	Incumbent resigned January 20, 2004 when convicted of vehicular manslaughter. New member elected June 1, 2004. Democratic gain. Winner was subsequently re-elected in November, see below.	▌ ✓ Stephanie Herseth (Democratic) 50.59%; ▌Larry Diedrich (Republican) 49.41%
North Carolina 1	Frank Ballance	Democratic	2002	Incumbent resigned June 11, 2004 due to health issues. New member elected July 20, 2004. Democratic hold. Winner was subsequently re-elected in November, see below.	▌ ✓ G. K. Butterfield (Democratic) 71.15%; ▌Greg Dority (Republican) 34.83%; ▌Thomas Eisenmenger (Libertarian) 1.76%

== Alabama ==
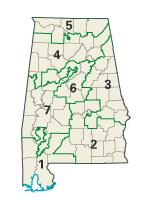
Alabama districts in these elections

District	Incumbent	Party	First elected	Result	Candidates
Alabama 1	Jo Bonner	Republican	2002	Incumbent re-elected.	▌ ✓ Jo Bonner (Republican) 63.2%; ▌Judy McCain Belk (Democratic) 36.8%
Alabama 2	Terry Everett	Republican	1992	Incumbent re-elected.	▌ ✓ Terry Everett (Republican) 71.5%; ▌Chuck James (Democratic) 28.5%
Alabama 3	Mike D. Rogers	Republican	2002	Incumbent re-elected.	▌ ✓ Mike Rogers (Republican) 61.2%; ▌Bill Fuller (Democratic) 38.8%
Alabama 4	Robert Aderholt	Republican	1996	Incumbent re-elected.	▌ ✓ Robert Aderholt (Republican) 74.8%; ▌Carl Cole (Democratic) 25.2%
Alabama 5	Robert E. Cramer	Democratic	1990	Incumbent re-elected.	▌ ✓ Bud Cramer (Democratic) 73.1%; ▌Gerry Wallace (Republican) 26.9%
Alabama 6	Spencer Bachus	Republican	1992	Incumbent re-elected.	▌ ✓ Spencer Bachus (Republican) Uncontested
Alabama 7	Artur Davis	Democratic	2002	Incumbent re-elected.	▌ ✓ Artur Davis (Democratic) 75.0%; ▌Steve Cameron (Republican) 25.0%

== Alaska ==
District	Incumbent	Party	First elected	Result	Candidates
Alaska at-large	Don Young	Republican	1973 (special)	Incumbent re-elected.	▌ ✓ Don Young (Republican) 71.1%; ▌Thomas Higgins (Democratic) 22.4%; ▌Timothy Feller (Green) 3.8%; ▌Alvin Anders (Libertarian) 2.4%

== Arizona ==
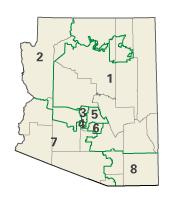
Arizona districts in these elections

District	Incumbent	Party	First elected	Result	Candidates
Arizona 1	Rick Renzi	Republican	2002	Incumbent re-elected.	▌ ✓ Rick Renzi (Republican) 58.6%; ▌Paul Babbitt (Democratic) 36.2%; ▌John Crockett (Libertarian) 5.2%
Arizona 2	Trent Franks	Republican	2002	Incumbent re-elected.	▌ ✓ Trent Franks (Republican) 59.2%; ▌Randy Camacho (Democratic) 38.4%; ▌Powell Gamill (Libertarian) 2.4%
Arizona 3	John Shadegg	Republican	1994	Incumbent re-elected.	▌ ✓ John Shadegg (Republican) 80.1%; ▌Mark Yannone (Libertarian) 19.9%
Arizona 4	Ed Pastor	Democratic	1991 (special)	Incumbent re-elected.	▌ ✓ Ed Pastor (Democratic) 70.1%; ▌Don Karg (Republican) 25.7%; ▌Gary Fallon (Libertarian) 4.2%
Arizona 5	J. D. Hayworth	Republican	1994	Incumbent re-elected.	▌ ✓ J. D. Hayworth (Republican) 59.5%; ▌Elizabeth Rogers (Democratic) 38.2%; ▌Michael Kielsky (Libertarian) 2.3%
Arizona 6	Jeff Flake	Republican	2000	Incumbent re-elected.	▌ ✓ Jeff Flake (Republican) 79.4%; ▌Craig Stritar (Libertarian) 20.6%
Arizona 7	Raúl Grijalva	Democratic	2002	Incumbent re-elected.	▌ ✓ Raúl Grijalva (Democratic) 62.0%; ▌Joseph D. Sweeney (Republican) 33.7%; ▌Dave Kaplan (Libertarian) 4.3%
Arizona 8	Jim Kolbe	Republican	1984	Incumbent re-elected.	▌ ✓ Jim Kolbe (Republican) 60.4%; ▌Eva Bacal (Democratic) 36.2%; ▌Robert Anderson (Libertarian) 3.4%

== Arkansas ==
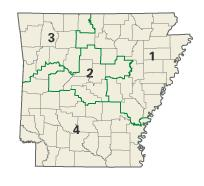
Arkansas districts in these elections

District	Incumbent	Party	First elected	Result	Candidates
Arkansas 1	Marion Berry	Democratic	1996	Incumbent re-elected.	▌ ✓ Marion Berry (Democratic) 66.6%; ▌Vernon Humphrey (Republican) 33.4%
Arkansas 2	Vic Snyder	Democratic	1996	Incumbent re-elected.	▌ ✓ Vic Snyder (Democratic) 58.2%; ▌Marvin Parks (Republican) 41.8%
Arkansas 3	John Boozman	Republican	2000	Incumbent re-elected.	▌ ✓ John Boozman (Republican) 59.3%; ▌Jan Judy (Democratic) 38.1%; ▌Dale Morfey (Independent) 2.6%
Arkansas 4	Mike Ross	Democratic	2000	Incumbent re-elected.	▌ ✓ Mike Ross (Democratic) Uncontested

== California ==
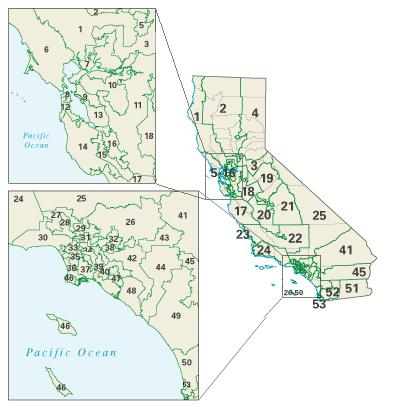
California districts in these elections

District	Incumbent	Party	First elected	Result	Candidates
California 1	Mike Thompson	Democratic	1998	Incumbent re-elected.	▌ ✓ Mike Thompson (Democratic) 67.0%; ▌Lawrence R. Wiesner (Republican) 28.2%; ▌Pamela Elizondo (Green) 4.8%
California 2	Wally Herger	Republican	1988	Incumbent re-elected.	▌ ✓ Wally Herger (Republican) 66.9%; ▌Mike Johnson (Democratic) 33.1%
California 3	Doug Ose	Republican	1998	Incumbent retired. Republican hold.	▌ ✓ Dan Lungren (Republican) 62.0%; ▌Gabe Castillo (Democratic) 34.8%; ▌Douglas Arthur Tuma (Libertarian) 3.2%
California 4	John Doolittle	Republican	1990	Incumbent re-elected.	▌ ✓ John Doolittle (Republican) 65.4%; ▌Dave Winters (Democratic) 34.6%
California 5	Bob Matsui	Democratic	1978	Incumbent re-elected.	▌ ✓ Bob Matsui (Democratic) 71.4%; ▌Mike Dugas (Republican) 23.4%; ▌Pat Driscoll (Green) 3.4%; ▌John C. Reiger (Peace and Freedom) 1.8%
California 6	Lynn Woolsey	Democratic	1992	Incumbent re-elected.	▌ ✓ Lynn Woolsey (Democratic) 72.7%; ▌Paul L. Erickson (Republican) 27.3%
California 7	George Miller	Democratic	1974	Incumbent re-elected.	▌ ✓ George Miller (Democratic) 76.1%; ▌Charles R. Hargrave (Republican) 23.9%
California 8	Nancy Pelosi	Democratic	1987 (special)	Incumbent re-elected.	▌ ✓ Nancy Pelosi (Democratic) 83.0%; ▌Jennifer DePalma (Republican) 11.5%; ▌Leilani Dowell (Peace and Freedom) 3.5%; ▌Terry Baum (Green) 2.0%
California 9	Barbara Lee	Democratic	1998	Incumbent re-elected.	▌ ✓ Barbara Lee (Democratic) 84.6%; ▌Claudia Bermudez (Republican) 12.3%; ▌James Eyer (Libertarian) 3.1%
California 10	Ellen Tauscher	Democratic	1996	Incumbent re-elected.	▌ ✓ Ellen Tauscher (Democratic) 65.8%; ▌Jeff Ketelson (Republican) 34.2%
California 11	Richard Pombo	Republican	1992	Incumbent re-elected.	▌ ✓ Richard Pombo (Republican) 61.3%; ▌Jerry McNerney (Democratic) 38.7%
California 12	Tom Lantos	Democratic	1980	Incumbent re-elected.	▌ ✓ Tom Lantos (Democratic) 68.1%; ▌Mike Garza (Republican) 20.8%; ▌Patricia Gray (Green) 9.1%; ▌Harland Harrison (Libertarian) 2.0%
California 13	Pete Stark	Democratic	1972	Incumbent re-elected.	▌ ✓ Pete Stark (Democratic) 71.7%; ▌George Bruno (Republican) 24.0%; ▌Mark Stroberg (Libertarian) 4.3%
California 14	Anna Eshoo	Democratic	1992	Incumbent re-elected.	▌ ✓ Anna Eshoo (Democratic) 69.8%; ▌Chris Haugen (Republican) 26.6%; ▌Brian Holtz (Libertarian) 3.6%
California 15	Mike Honda	Democratic	2000	Incumbent re-elected.	▌ ✓ Mike Honda (Democratic) 72.1%; ▌Raymond Chukwu (Republican) 27.9%
California 16	Zoe Lofgren	Democratic	1994	Incumbent re-elected.	▌ ✓ Zoe Lofgren (Democratic) 70.9%; ▌Douglas Adams McNea (Republican) 26.4%; ▌Markus Welch (Libertarian) 2.7%
California 17	Sam Farr	Democratic	1992	Incumbent re-elected.	▌ ✓ Sam Farr (Democratic) 66.8%; ▌Mark Risley (Republican) 29.2%; ▌Ray Glock-Grueneich (Green) 1.7%; ▌Joe Williams (Peace and Freedom) 1.2%; ▌Joel Smolen (Libertarian) 1.1%
California 18	Dennis Cardoza	Democratic	2002	Incumbent re-elected.	▌ ✓ Dennis Cardoza (Democratic) 67.5%; ▌Charles Pringle (Republican) 32.5%
California 19	George Radanovich	Republican	1996	Incumbent re-elected.	▌ ✓ George Radanovich (Republican) 66.1%; ▌James Lex Bufford (Democratic) 27.2%; ▌Larry Mullen (Green) 6.7%
California 20	Cal Dooley	Democratic	1990	Incumbent retired. Democratic hold.	▌ ✓ Jim Costa (Democratic) 53.5%; ▌Roy Ashburn (Republican) 46.5%
California 21	Devin Nunes	Republican	2000	Incumbent re-elected.	▌ ✓ Devin Nunes (Republican) 73.2%; ▌Fred Davis (Democratic) 26.8%
California 22	Bill Thomas	Republican	1978	Incumbent re-elected.	▌ ✓ Bill Thomas (Republican) Uncontested
California 23	Lois Capps	Democratic	1998	Incumbent re-elected.	▌ ✓ Lois Capps (Democratic) 63.1%; ▌Don Regan (Republican) 34.3%; ▌Michael Favorite (Libertarian) 2.6%
California 24	Elton Gallegly	Republican	1986	Incumbent re-elected.	▌ ✓ Elton Gallegly (Republican) 62.9%; ▌Brett Wagner (Democratic) 33.9%; ▌Stuart Bechman (Green) 3.2%
California 25	Buck McKeon	Republican	1992	Incumbent re-elected.	▌ ✓ Buck McKeon (Republican) 64.5%; ▌Tim Willoughby (Democratic) 35.5%
California 26	David Dreier	Republican	1980	Incumbent re-elected.	▌ ✓ David Dreier (Republican) 53.6%; ▌Cynthia Matthews (Democratic) 42.8%; ▌Randall Weissbuch (Libertarian) 3.6%
California 27	Brad Sherman	Democratic	1996	Incumbent re-elected.	▌ ✓ Brad Sherman (Democratic) 62.3%; ▌Robert Levy (Republican) 33.3%; ▌Eric Carter (Green) 4.4%
California 28	Howard Berman	Democratic	1982	Incumbent re-elected.	▌ ✓ Howard Berman (Democratic) 71.0%; ▌David Hernandez Jr. (Republican) 23.3%; ▌Kelley Ross (Libertarian) 5.7%
California 29	Adam Schiff	Democratic	2000	Incumbent re-elected.	▌ ✓ Adam Schiff (Democratic) 64.7%; ▌Harry Scolinos (Republican) 30.4%; ▌Philip Koebel (Green) 2.7%; ▌Ted Brown (Libertarian) 2.2%
California 30	Henry Waxman	Democratic	1974	Incumbent re-elected.	▌ ✓ Henry Waxman (Democratic) 71.3%; ▌Victor Elizalde (Republican) 28.7%
California 31	Xavier Becerra	Democratic	1992	Incumbent re-elected.	▌ ✓ Xavier Becerra (Democratic) 80.3%; ▌Luis Vega (Republican) 19.7%
California 32	Hilda Solis	Democratic	2000	Incumbent re-elected.	▌ ✓ Hilda Solis (Democratic) 85.1%; ▌Leland Faegre (Libertarian) 14.9%
California 33	Diane Watson	Democratic	2001 (special)	Incumbent re-elected.	▌ ✓ Diane Watson (Democratic) 88.6%; ▌Robert "Bob" Weber (Libertarian) 11.4%
California 34	Lucille Roybal-Allard	Democratic	1992	Incumbent re-elected.	▌ ✓ Lucille Roybal-Allard (Democratic) 74.5%; ▌Wayne Miller (Republican) 25.5%
California 35	Maxine Waters	Democratic	1990	Incumbent re-elected.	▌ ✓ Maxine Waters (Democratic) 80.6%; ▌Ross Moen (Republican) 15.1%; ▌Gordon Mego (American Independent) 2.2%; ▌Charles Tate (Libertarian) 2.1%
California 36	Jane Harman	Democratic	1992; 1998 (retired); 2000	Incumbent re-elected.	▌ ✓ Jane Harman (Democratic) 62.0%; ▌Paul P. Whitehead (Republican) 33.5%; ▌Alice Stek (Peace and Freedom) 2.5%; ▌Michael J. Binkley (Libertarian) 2.0%
California 37	Juanita Millender-McDonald	Democratic	1996	Incumbent re-elected.	▌ ✓ Juanita Millender-McDonald (Democratic) 75.1%; ▌Vernon Van (Republican) 20.2%; ▌Herb Peters (Libertarian) 4.7%
California 38	Grace Napolitano	Democratic	1998	Incumbent re-elected.	▌ ✓ Grace Napolitano (Democratic) Uncontested
California 39	Linda Sánchez	Democratic	2002	Incumbent re-elected.	▌ ✓ Linda Sánchez (Democratic) 60.7%; ▌Tim Escobar (Republican) 39.3%
California 40	Ed Royce	Republican	1992	Incumbent re-elected.	▌ ✓ Ed Royce (Republican) 68.0%; ▌J. Tilman Williams (Democratic) 32.0%
California 41	Jerry Lewis	Republican	1978	Incumbent re-elected.	▌ ✓ Jerry Lewis (Republican) 83.0%; ▌Peymon Mottahedeh (Libertarian) 17.0%
California 42	Gary Miller	Republican	1998	Incumbent re-elected.	▌ ✓ Gary Miller (Republican) 68.2%; ▌Lewis Myers (Democratic) 31.8%
California 43	Joe Baca	Democratic	1999 (special)	Incumbent re-elected.	▌ ✓ Joe Baca (Democratic) 66.4%; ▌Ed Laning (Republican) 33.6%
California 44	Ken Calvert	Republican	1992	Incumbent re-elected.	▌ ✓ Ken Calvert (Republican) 61.7%; ▌Louis Vandenberg (Democratic) 35.0%; ▌Kevin Akin (Peace and Freedom) 3.3%
California 45	Mary Bono	Republican	1998	Incumbent re-elected.	▌ ✓ Mary Bono (Republican) 66.7%; ▌Richard Meyer (Democratic) 33.3%
California 46	Dana Rohrabacher	Republican	1988	Incumbent re-elected.	▌ ✓ Dana Rohrabacher (Republican) 62.0%; ▌Jim Brandt (Democratic) 32.5%; ▌Thomas Lash (Green) 3.7%; ▌Keith Gann (Libertarian) 1.8%
California 47	Loretta Sanchez	Democratic	1996	Incumbent re-elected.	▌ ✓ Loretta Sanchez (Democratic) 60.4%; ▌Alexandria Coronado (Republican) 39.6%
California 48	Christopher Cox	Republican	1988	Incumbent re-elected.	▌ ✓ Christopher Cox (Republican) 65.0%; ▌John Graham (Democratic) 32.2%; ▌Bruce David Cohen (Libertarian) 2.8%
California 49	Darrell Issa	Republican	2000	Incumbent re-elected.	▌ ✓ Darrell Issa (Republican) 62.6%; ▌Mike Byron (Democratic) 34.9%; ▌Lars Grossmith (Libertarian) 2.5%
California 50	Duke Cunningham	Republican	1990	Incumbent re-elected.	▌ ✓ Duke Cunningham (Republican) 58.5%; ▌Francine Busby (Democratic) 36.5%; ▌Gary Waayers (Green) 2.2%; ▌Diane Templin (American Independent) 1.6%; ▌Brandon Osborne (Libertarian) 1.2%
California 51	Bob Filner	Democratic	1992	Incumbent re-elected.	▌ ✓ Bob Filner (Democratic) 61.7%; ▌Mike Giorgino (Republican) 35.1%; ▌Mike Metti (Libertarian) 3.2%
California 52	Duncan L. Hunter	Republican	1980	Incumbent re-elected.	▌ ✓ Duncan L. Hunter (Republican) 69.2%; ▌Brian Keliher (Democratic) 27.6%; ▌Michael Benoit (Libertarian) 3.2%
California 53	Susan Davis	Democratic	2000	Incumbent re-elected.	▌ ✓ Susan Davis (Democratic) 66.2%; ▌Darin Hunzeker (Republican) 28.9%; ▌Lawrence Rockwood (Green) 3.3%; ▌Adam Van Susteren (Libertarian) 1.6%

== Colorado ==
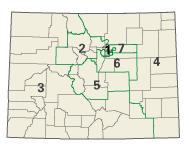
Colorado districts in these elections

District	Incumbent	Party	First elected	Result	Candidates
Colorado 1	Diana DeGette	Democratic	1996	Incumbent re-elected.	▌ ✓ Diana DeGette (Democratic) 73.5%; ▌Roland Chicas (Republican) 24.3%; ▌George Lilly (Independent) 2.2%
Colorado 2	Mark Udall	Democratic	1998	Incumbent re-elected.	▌ ✓ Mark Udall (Democratic) 67.2%; ▌Stephen Hackman (Republican) 30.4%; ▌Norman Olsen (Libertarian) 2.4%
Colorado 3	Scott McInnis	Republican	1992	Incumbent retired. Democratic gain.	▌ ✓ John Salazar (Democratic) 50.5%; ▌Greg Walcher (Republican) 46.6%; ▌Jim Krug (Independent) 2.9%
Colorado 4	Marilyn Musgrave	Republican	2002	Incumbent re-elected.	▌ ✓ Marilyn Musgrave (Republican) 51.0%; ▌Stan Matsunaka (Democratic) 44.8%; ▌Bob Kinsey (Green) 4.2%
Colorado 5	Joel Hefley	Republican	1986	Incumbent re-elected.	▌ ✓ Joel Hefley (Republican) 70.6%; ▌Fred Hardee (Democratic) 27.0%; ▌Arthur Roberts (Libertarian) 2.4%
Colorado 6	Tom Tancredo	Republican	1998	Incumbent re-elected.	▌ ✓ Tom Tancredo (Republican) 59.7%; ▌Joanna Conti (Democratic) 39.2%; ▌Jack Woehr (Libertarian) 1.1%
Colorado 7	Bob Beauprez	Republican	2002	Incumbent re-elected.	▌ ✓ Bob Beauprez (Republican) 54.7%; ▌Dave Thomas (Democratic) 42.8%; ▌Clyde Harkins (Independent) 2.5%

== Connecticut ==
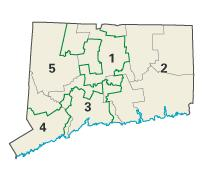
Connecticut districts in these elections

District	Incumbent	Party	First elected	Result	Candidates
Connecticut 1	John B. Larson	Democratic	1998	Incumbent re-elected.	▌ ✓ John B. Larson (Democratic) 73.0%; ▌John Halstead (Republican) 27.0%
Connecticut 2	Rob Simmons	Republican	2000	Incumbent re-elected.	▌ ✓ Rob Simmons (Republican) 54.2%; ▌Jim Sullivan (Democratic) 45.8%
Connecticut 3	Rosa DeLauro	Democratic	1990	Incumbent re-elected.	▌ ✓ Rosa DeLauro (Democratic) 72.4%; ▌Richter Elser (Republican) 25.0%; ▌Ralph Ferrucci (Green) 2.6%
Connecticut 4	Chris Shays	Republican	1987 (special)	Incumbent re-elected.	▌ ✓ Chris Shays (Republican) 52.4%; ▌Diane Farrell (Democratic) 47.6%
Connecticut 5	Nancy Johnson	Republican	1982	Incumbent re-elected.	▌ ✓ Nancy Johnson (Republican) 59.8%; ▌Terry Gerratana (Democratic) 38.2%; ▌Fernando Ramirez (Working Families) 1.1%; ▌Wildey J. Moore (Concerned Citizens) 0.9%

== Delaware ==
District	Incumbent	Party	First elected	Result	Candidates
Delaware at-large	Mike Castle	Republican	1992	Incumbent re-elected.	▌ ✓ Mike Castle (Republican) 69.1%; ▌Paul Donnelly (Democratic) 29.7%; ▌Maurice J. Barros (Independent) 0.7%; ▌William E. Norris (Libertarian) 0.5%

== Florida ==
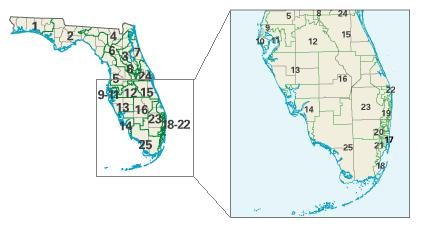
Florida districts in these elections

District	Incumbent	Party	First elected	Result	Candidates
Florida 1	Jeff Miller	Republican	2001 (special)	Incumbent re-elected.	▌ ✓ Jeff Miller (Republican) 76.5%; ▌Mark Coutu (Democratic) 23.5%
Florida 2	Allen Boyd	Democratic	1996	Incumbent re-elected.	▌ ✓ Allen Boyd (Democratic) 61.6%; ▌Bev Kilmer (Republican) 38.4%
Florida 3	Corrine Brown	Democratic	1992	Incumbent re-elected.	▌ ✓ Corrine Brown (Democratic) Uncontested
Florida 4	Ander Crenshaw	Republican	2000	Incumbent re-elected.	▌ ✓ Ander Crenshaw (Republican) Uncontested
Florida 5	Ginny Brown-Waite	Republican	2002	Incumbent re-elected.	▌ ✓ Ginny Brown-Waite (Republican) 65.9%; ▌Robert Whittel (Democratic) 34.1%
Florida 6	Cliff Stearns	Republican	1988	Incumbent re-elected.	▌ ✓ Cliff Stearns (Republican) 64.4%; ▌Dave Bruderly (Democratic) 35.6%
Florida 7	John Mica	Republican	1992	Incumbent re-elected.	▌ ✓ John Mica (Republican) Uncontested
Florida 8	Ric Keller	Republican	2000	Incumbent re-elected.	▌ ✓ Ric Keller (Republican) 60.5%; ▌Stephen Murray (Democratic) 39.5%
Florida 9	Michael Bilirakis	Republican	1982	Incumbent re-elected.	▌ ✓ Michael Bilirakis (Republican) Uncontested
Florida 10	Bill Young	Republican	1970	Incumbent re-elected.	▌ ✓ Bill Young (Republican) 69.3%; ▌Robert Dean Derry (Democratic) 30.7%
Florida 11	Jim Davis	Democratic	1996	Incumbent re-elected.	▌ ✓ Jim Davis (Democratic) 85.8%; ▌Robert Johnson (Libertarian) 14.2%
Florida 12	Adam Putnam	Republican	2000	Incumbent re-elected.	▌ ✓ Adam Putnam (Republican) 64.9%; ▌Bob Hagenmeier (Democratic) 35.1%
Florida 13	Katherine Harris	Republican	2002	Incumbent re-elected.	▌ ✓ Katherine Harris (Republican) 55.3%; ▌Jan Schneider (Democratic) 44.7%
Florida 14	Vacant			Rep. Porter Goss (R) resigned September 23, 2004; Republican hold.	▌ ✓ Connie Mack IV (Republican) 67.6%; ▌Robert Neeld (Democratic) 32.4%
Florida 15	Dave Weldon	Republican	1994	Incumbent re-elected.	▌ ✓ Dave Weldon (Republican) 65.4%; ▌Simon Pristoop (Democratic) 34.6%
Florida 16	Mark Foley	Republican	1994	Incumbent re-elected.	▌ ✓ Mark Foley (Republican) 68.0%; ▌Jeffrey Jay Fisher (Democratic) 32.0%
Florida 17	Kendrick Meek	Democratic	2002	Incumbent re-elected.	▌ ✓ Kendrick Meek (Democratic) Uncontested
Florida 18	Ileana Ros-Lehtinen	Republican	1989 (special)	Incumbent re-elected.	▌ ✓ Ileana Ros-Lehtinen (Republican) 64.7%; ▌Samuel Martin Sheldon (Democratic) 35.3%
Florida 19	Robert Wexler	Democratic	1996	Incumbent re-elected.	▌ ✓ Robert Wexler (Democratic) Uncontested
Florida 20	Peter Deutsch	Democratic	1992	Incumbent retired to run for U.S. Senator. Democratic hold.	▌ ✓ Debbie Wasserman Schultz (Democratic) 70.2%; ▌Margaret Hostetter (Republican) 29.8%
Florida 21	Lincoln Díaz-Balart	Republican	1992	Incumbent re-elected.	▌ ✓ Lincoln Díaz-Balart (Republican) 72.8%; ▌Frank Gonzalez (Libertarian) 27.2%
Florida 22	Clay Shaw	Republican	1980	Incumbent re-elected.	▌ ✓ Clay Shaw (Republican) 62.9%; ▌Jim Stork (Democratic) 35.4%; ▌Jack McLain (Constitution) 1.7%
Florida 23	Alcee Hastings	Democratic	1992	Incumbent re-elected.	▌ ✓ Alcee Hastings (Democratic) Uncontested
Florida 24	Tom Feeney	Republican	2002	Incumbent re-elected.	▌ ✓ Tom Feeney (Republican) Uncontested
Florida 25	Mario Díaz-Balart	Republican	2002	Incumbent re-elected.	▌ ✓ Mario Díaz-Balart (Republican) Uncontested

== Georgia ==
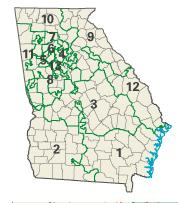
Georgia districts in these elections

District	Incumbent	Party	First elected	Result	Candidates
Georgia 1	Jack Kingston	Republican	1992	Incumbent re-elected.	▌ ✓ Jack Kingston (Republican) Uncontested
Georgia 2	Sanford Bishop	Democratic	1992	Incumbent re-elected.	▌ ✓ Sanford Bishop (Democratic) 66.8%; ▌Dave Eversman (Republican) 33.2%
Georgia 3	Jim Marshall	Democratic	2002	Incumbent re-elected.	▌ ✓ Jim Marshall (Democratic) 62.9%; ▌Calder Clay (Republican) 37.1%
Georgia 4	Denise Majette	Democratic	2002	Incumbent retired to run for U.S. Senator. Democratic hold.	▌ ✓ Cynthia McKinney (Democratic) 63.8%; ▌Catherine Davis (Republican) 36.2%
Georgia 5	John Lewis	Democratic	1986	Incumbent re-elected.	▌ ✓ John Lewis (Democratic) Uncontested
Georgia 6	Johnny Isakson	Republican	1998	Incumbent retired to run for U.S. Senator. Republican hold.	▌ ✓ Tom Price (Republican) Uncontested
Georgia 7	John Linder	Republican	1992	Incumbent re-elected.	▌ ✓ John Linder (Republican) Uncontested
Georgia 8	Mac Collins	Republican	1992	Incumbent retired to run for U.S. Senator. Republican hold.	▌ ✓ Lynn Westmoreland (Republican) 75.6%; ▌Silvia Delamar (Democratic) 24.4%
Georgia 9	Charlie Norwood	Republican	1994	Incumbent re-elected.	▌ ✓ Charlie Norwood (Republican) 74.3%; ▌Bob Ellis (Democratic) 25.7%
Georgia 10	Nathan Deal	Republican	1992 (Note: Deal was originally elected as a Democrat. He switched parties in April 1995.)	Incumbent re-elected.	▌ ✓ Nathan Deal (Republican) Uncontested
Georgia 11	Phil Gingrey	Republican	2002	Incumbent re-elected.	▌ ✓ Phil Gingrey (Republican) 57.4%; ▌Rick Crawford (Democratic) 42.6%
Georgia 12	Max Burns	Republican	2002	Incumbent lost re-election. Democratic gain.	▌ ✓ John Barrow (Democratic) 51.8%; ▌Max Burns (Republican) 48.2%
Georgia 13	David Scott	Democratic	2002	Incumbent re-elected.	▌ ✓ David Scott (Democratic) Uncontested

== Hawaii ==
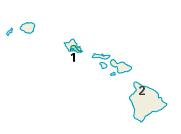
Hawaii districts in these elections

District	Incumbent	Party	First elected	Result	Candidates
Hawaii 1	Neil Abercrombie	Democratic	1986 (special); 1988 (lost renomination); 1990	Incumbent re-elected.	▌ ✓ Neil Abercrombie (Democratic) 63.0%; ▌Dalton Tanonaka (Republican) 34.0%; ▌Elyssa Young (Libertarian) 3.0%
Hawaii 2	Ed Case	Democratic	2002 (special)	Incumbent re-elected.	▌ ✓ Ed Case (Democratic) 62.8%; ▌Mike Gabbard (Republican) 37.2%

== Idaho ==
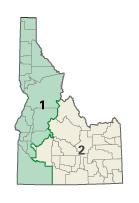
Idaho districts in these elections

District	Incumbent	Party	First elected	Result	Candidates
Idaho 1	Butch Otter	Republican	2000	Incumbent re-elected.	▌ ✓ Butch Otter (Republican) 69.5%; ▌Naomi Preston (Democratic) 30.5%
Idaho 2	Mike Simpson	Republican	1998	Incumbent re-elected.	▌ ✓ Mike Simpson (Republican) 70.7%; ▌Lin Whitworth (Democratic) 29.3%

== Illinois ==
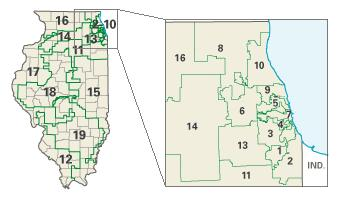
Illinois districts in these elections

District	Incumbent	Party	First elected	Result	Candidates
Illinois 1	Bobby Rush	Democratic	1992	Incumbent re-elected.	▌ ✓ Bobby Rush (Democratic) 84.8%; ▌Raymond Wardingley (Republican) 15.2%
Illinois 2	Jesse Jackson Jr.	Democratic	1995 (special)	Incumbent re-elected.	▌ ✓ Jesse Jackson Jr. (Democratic) 88.5%; ▌Stephanie Sailor (Libertarian) 11.5%
Illinois 3	Bill Lipinski	Democratic	1982	Incumbent retired. Democratic hold.	▌ ✓ Dan Lipinski (Democratic) 72.6%; ▌Ryan Chlada (Republican) 25.7%
Illinois 4	Luis Gutiérrez	Democratic	1992	Incumbent re-elected.	▌ ✓ Luis Gutiérrez (Democratic) 83.7%; ▌Tony Cisneros (Republican) 12.4%; ▌Jacob Witmer (Libertarian) 3.9%
Illinois 5	Rahm Emanuel	Democratic	2002	Incumbent re-elected.	▌ ✓ Rahm Emanuel (Democratic) 76.2%; ▌Bruce Best (Republican) 23.8%
Illinois 6	Henry Hyde	Republican	1974	Incumbent re-elected.	▌ ✓ Henry Hyde (Republican) 55.8%; ▌Christine Cegelis (Democratic) 44.2%
Illinois 7	Danny Davis	Democratic	1996	Incumbent re-elected.	▌ ✓ Danny Davis (Democratic) 86.1%; ▌Antonio Davis-Fairman (Republican) 13.9%
Illinois 8	Phil Crane	Republican	1969 (special)	Incumbent lost re-election. Democratic gain.	▌ ✓ Melissa Bean (Democratic) 51.7%; ▌Phil Crane (Republican) 48.3%
Illinois 9	Jan Schakowsky	Democratic	1998	Incumbent re-elected.	▌ ✓ Jan Schakowsky (Democratic) 75.7%; ▌Kurt Eckhardt (Republican) 24.3%
Illinois 10	Mark Kirk	Republican	2000	Incumbent re-elected.	▌ ✓ Mark Kirk (Republican) 64.1%; ▌Lee Goodman (Democratic) 35.9%
Illinois 11	Jerry Weller	Republican	1994	Incumbent re-elected.	▌ ✓ Jerry Weller (Republican) 58.7%; ▌Tari Renner (Democratic) 41.3%
Illinois 12	Jerry Costello	Democratic	1988	Incumbent re-elected.	▌ ✓ Jerry Costello (Democratic) 69.5%; ▌Erin Zweigart (Republican) 28.8%; ▌Walter Steele (Libertarian) 1.7%
Illinois 13	Judy Biggert	Republican	1998	Incumbent re-elected.	▌ ✓ Judy Biggert (Republican) 65.0%; ▌Gloria Andersen (Democratic) 35.0%
Illinois 14	Dennis Hastert	Republican	1986	Incumbent re-elected.	▌ ✓ Dennis Hastert (Republican) 68.6%; ▌Ruben K. Zamora (Democratic) 31.4%
Illinois 15	Tim Johnson	Republican	2000	Incumbent re-elected.	▌ ✓ Tim Johnson (Republican) 61.1%; ▌David Gill (Democratic) 38.9%
Illinois 16	Don Manzullo	Republican	1992	Incumbent re-elected.	▌ ✓ Don Manzullo (Republican) 69.1%; ▌John Kutsch (Democratic) 30.9%
Illinois 17	Lane Evans	Democratic	1982	Incumbent re-elected.	▌ ✓ Lane Evans (Democratic) 60.7%; ▌Andrea Lane Zinga (Republican) 39.3%
Illinois 18	Ray LaHood	Republican	1994	Incumbent re-elected.	▌ ✓ Ray LaHood (Republican) 70.2%; ▌Steve Waterworth (Democratic) 29.8%
Illinois 19	John Shimkus	Republican	1996	Incumbent re-elected.	▌ ✓ John Shimkus (Republican) 69.4%; ▌Tim Bagwell (Democratic) 30.6%

== Indiana ==
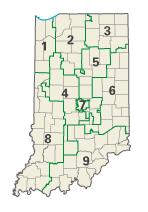
Indiana districts in these elections

District	Incumbent	Party	First elected	Result	Candidates
Indiana 1	Pete Visclosky	Democratic	1984	Incumbent re-elected.	▌ ✓ Pete Visclosky (Democratic) 68.3%; ▌Mark Leyva (Republican) 31.7%
Indiana 2	Chris Chocola	Republican	2002	Incumbent re-elected.	▌ ✓ Chris Chocola (Republican) 54.2%; ▌Joe Donnelly (Democratic) 44.5%; ▌Douglas Barnes (Libertarian) 1.3%
Indiana 3	Mark Souder	Republican	1994	Incumbent re-elected.	▌ ✓ Mark Souder (Republican) 69.2%; ▌Maria Parra (Democratic) 30.8%
Indiana 4	Steve Buyer	Republican	1992	Incumbent re-elected.	▌ ✓ Steve Buyer (Republican) 69.5%; ▌David Sanders (Democratic) 28.3%; ▌Kevin Fleming (Libertarian) 2.2%
Indiana 5	Dan Burton	Republican	1982	Incumbent re-elected.	▌ ✓ Dan Burton (Republican) 71.8%; ▌Katherine Fox Carr (Democratic) 26.0%; ▌Rick Hodgin (Libertarian) 2.2%
Indiana 6	Mike Pence	Republican	2000	Incumbent re-elected.	▌ ✓ Mike Pence (Republican) 67.1%; ▌Mel Fox (Democratic) 31.3%; ▌Chad Roots (Libertarian) 1.6%
Indiana 7	Julia Carson	Democratic	1996	Incumbent re-elected.	▌ ✓ Julia Carson (Democratic) 54.3%; ▌Andy Horning (Republican) 43.7%; ▌Barry Campbell (Libertarian) 2.0%
Indiana 8	John Hostettler	Republican	1994	Incumbent re-elected.	▌ ✓ John Hostettler (Republican) 53.4%; ▌Jon Jennings (Democratic) 44.5%; ▌Mark Garvin (Libertarian) 2.1%
Indiana 9	Baron Hill	Democratic	1998	Incumbent lost re-election. Republican gain.	▌ ✓ Mike Sodrel (Republican) 49.4%; ▌Baron Hill (Democratic) 49.0%; ▌Al Cox (Libertarian) 1.6%

== Iowa ==
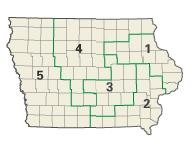
Iowa districts in these elections

District	Incumbent	Party	First elected	Result	Candidates
Iowa 1	Jim Nussle	Republican	1990	Incumbent re-elected.	▌ ✓ Jim Nussle (Republican) 55.2%; ▌Bill Gluba (Democratic) 43.3%; ▌Mark Nelson (Libertarian) 0.9%; ▌Denny Heath (Independent) 0.6%
Iowa 2	Jim Leach	Republican	1976	Incumbent re-elected.	▌ ✓ Jim Leach (Republican) 58.9%; ▌Dave Franker (Democratic) 39.2%; ▌Kevin Litten (Libertarian) 1.9%
Iowa 3	Leonard Boswell	Democratic	1996	Incumbent re-elected.	▌ ✓ Leonard Boswell (Democratic) 55.2%; ▌Stan Thompson (Republican) 44.8%
Iowa 4	Tom Latham	Republican	1994	Incumbent re-elected.	▌ ✓ Tom Latham (Republican) 60.9%; ▌Paul Johnson (Democratic) 39.1%
Iowa 5	Steve King	Republican	2002	Incumbent re-elected.	▌ ✓ Steve King (Republican) 63.4%; ▌Joyce Schulte (Democratic) 36.6%

== Kansas ==
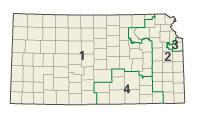
Kansas districts in these elections

District	Incumbent	Party	First elected	Result	Candidates
Kansas 1	Jerry Moran	Republican	1996	Incumbent re-elected.	▌ ✓ Jerry Moran (Republican) 90.7%; ▌Jack Warner (Libertarian) 9.2%
Kansas 2	Jim Ryun	Republican	1996	Incumbent re-elected.	▌ ✓ Jim Ryun (Republican) 56.1%; ▌Nancy Boyda (Democratic) 41.2%; ▌Dennis Hawver (Libertarian) 2.5%
Kansas 3	Dennis Moore	Democratic	1998	Incumbent re-elected.	▌ ✓ Dennis Moore (Democratic) 54.8%; ▌Kris Kobach (Republican) 43.3%; ▌Joe Bellis (Libertarian) 0.9%; ▌Richard Wells (Reform) 0.8%
Kansas 4	Todd Tiahrt	Republican	1994	Incumbent re-elected.	▌ ✓ Todd Tiahrt (Republican) 66.1%; ▌Michael Kinard (Democratic) 31.0%; ▌David Loomis (Libertarian) 2.8%

== Kentucky ==
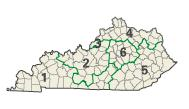
Kentucky districts in these elections

District	Incumbent	Party	First elected	Result	Candidates
Kentucky 1	Ed Whitfield	Republican	1994	Incumbent re-elected.	▌ ✓ Ed Whitfield (Republican) 67.4%; ▌Billy Cartwright (Democratic) 32.6%
Kentucky 2	Ron Lewis	Republican	1994	Incumbent re-elected.	▌ ✓ Ron Lewis (Republican) 67.9%; ▌Adam Smith (Democratic) 32.1%
Kentucky 3	Anne Northup	Republican	1996	Incumbent re-elected.	▌ ✓ Anne Northup (Republican) 60.3%; ▌Tony Miller (Democratic) 37.8%; ▌George Dick (Libertarian) 1.9%
Kentucky 4	Ken Lucas	Democratic	1998	Incumbent retired. Republican gain.	▌ ✓ Geoff Davis (Republican) 54.4%; ▌Nick Clooney (Democratic) 43.9%; ▌Michael Slider (Independent) 1.7%
Kentucky 5	Hal Rogers	Republican	1980	Incumbent re-elected.	▌ ✓ Hal Rogers (Republican) Uncontested
Kentucky 6	Ben Chandler	Democratic	2004 Special	Incumbent re-elected.	▌ ✓ Ben Chandler (Democratic) 58.6%; ▌Tom Buford (Republican) 40.0%; ▌Stacy Abner (Constitution) 0.8%; ▌Mark Gailey (Libertarian) 0.6%

== Louisiana ==
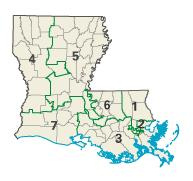
Louisiana districts in these elections

On December 4, 2004, a run-off election was held to determine the winner of the 3rd and 7th congressional districts. In the 3rd district, Charlie Melançon narrowly defeated Billy Tauzin III. In the 7th district, Charles Boustany defeated Willie Mount. Thus, both seats switched to the opposite party.

District	Incumbent	Party	First elected	Result	Candidates
Louisiana 1	David Vitter	Republican	1999 (special)	Incumbent retired to run for U.S. Senator. Republican hold.	▌ ✓ Bobby Jindal (Republican) 78.4%; ▌Roy Armstrong (Democratic) 6.7%; ▌Vinny Mendoza (Democratic) 4.4%; ▌Daniel Zimmerman (Democratic) 4.2%; ▌Jerry Watts (Democratic) 3.5%; ▌Mike Rogers (Republican) 2.8%
Louisiana 2	William J. Jefferson	Democratic	1990	Incumbent re-elected.	▌ ✓ Bill Jefferson (Democratic) 79.0%; ▌Art Schwertz (Republican) 21.0%
Louisiana 3	Billy Tauzin	Republican	1980 (Note: Tauzin was first elected as a Democrat. He switched to the Republican Party in August 1995.)	Incumbent retired. Democratic gain.	First round: ▌ Billy Tauzin III (Republican) 32.0%; ▌ Charlie Melançon (Democratic) 23.9%; ▌Craig Romero (Republican) 23.1%; ▌Damon Baldone (Democratic) 9.7%; ▌Charmaine Caccioppi (Democratic) 7.3%; ▌Kevin Chiasson (Republican) 3.9%; Runoff: ▌ ✓ Charlie Melançon (Democratic) 50.25%; ▌Billy Tauzin III (Republican) 49.75%
Louisiana 4	Jim McCrery	Republican	1988	Incumbent re-elected.	▌ ✓ Jim McCrery (Republican) Uncontested
Louisiana 5	Rodney Alexander	Republican	2002 (Note: Alexander was elected as a Democrat. He became a Republican in August 2004.)	Incumbent re-elected.	▌ ✓ Rodney Alexander (Republican) 59.4%; ▌Tisa Blakes (Democratic) 24.6%; ▌Jock Scott (Republican) 16.0%
Louisiana 6	Richard Baker	Republican	1986	Incumbent re-elected.	▌ ✓ Richard Baker (Republican) 72.2%; ▌Rufus Craig Jr. (Democratic) 19.4%; ▌Scott Galmon (Democratic) 8.4%
Louisiana 7	Chris John	Democratic	1996	Incumbent retired to run for U.S. Senator. Republican gain.	First round: ▌ Charles Boustany (Republican) 38.6%; ▌ Willie Mount (Democratic) 25.2%; ▌Don Cravins (Democratic) 24.6%; ▌David Thibodaux (Republican) 9.7%; ▌Malcolm Carriere (Democratic) 1.9%; Runoff: ▌ ✓ Charles Boustany (Republican) 55.0%; ▌Willie Mount (Democratic) 45.0%

== Maine ==
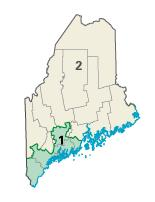
Maine districts in these elections

District	Incumbent	Party	First elected	Result	Candidates
Maine 1	Tom Allen	Democratic	2002	Incumbent re-elected.	▌ ✓ Tom Allen (Democratic) 59.7%; ▌Charlie Summers (Republican) 40.3%
Maine 2	Mike Michaud	Democratic	2002	Incumbent re-elected.	▌ ✓ Mike Michaud (Democratic) 58.0%; ▌Brian Hamel (Republican) 39.5%; ▌Carl Cooley (Independent) 2.5%

== Maryland ==
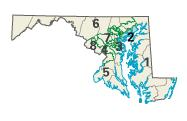
Maryland districts in these elections

District	Incumbent	Party	First elected	Result	Candidates
Maryland 1	Wayne Gilchrest	Republican	1990	Incumbent re-elected.	▌ ✓ Wayne Gilchrest (Republican) 75.9%; ▌Kostas Alexakis (Democratic) 24.1%
Maryland 2	Dutch Ruppersberger	Democratic	2002	Incumbent re-elected.	▌ ✓ Dutch Ruppersberger (Democratic) 66.7%; ▌Jane Brooks (Republican) 30.7%; ▌Keith Salkowski (Green) 2.6%
Maryland 3	Ben Cardin	Democratic	1986	Incumbent re-elected.	▌ ✓ Ben Cardin (Democratic) 63.4%; ▌Robert Duckworth (Republican) 33.8%; ▌Patsy Allen (Green) 2.8%
Maryland 4	Albert Wynn	Democratic	1992	Incumbent re-elected.	▌ ✓ Albert Wynn (Democratic) 75.2%; ▌John McKinnis (Republican) 20.2%; ▌Theresa Dudley (Green) 4.6%
Maryland 5	Steny Hoyer	Democratic	1981 (special)	Incumbent re-elected.	▌ ✓ Steny Hoyer (Democratic) 68.7%; ▌Brad Jewitt (Republican) 29.3%; ▌Bob Auerbach (Green) 1.4%; ▌Steven Krukar (Constitution) 0.6%
Maryland 6	Roscoe Bartlett	Republican	1992	Incumbent re-elected.	▌ ✓ Roscoe Bartlett (Republican) 67.5%; ▌Kenneth Bosley (Democratic) 29.4%; ▌Gregory Hemingway (Green) 3.1%
Maryland 7	Elijah Cummings	Democratic	1996	Incumbent re-elected.	▌ ✓ Elijah Cummings (Democratic) 73.4%; ▌Tony Salazar (Republican) 24.6%; ▌Virginia Rodino (Green) 2.0%
Maryland 8	Chris Van Hollen	Democratic	2002	Incumbent re-elected.	▌ ✓ Chris Van Hollen (Democratic) 74.9%; ▌Chuck Floyd (Republican) 25.1%

== Massachusetts ==
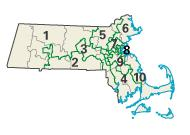
Massachusetts districts in these elections

District	Incumbent	Party	First elected	Result	Candidates
Massachusetts 1	John Olver	Democratic	1991 (special)	Incumbent re-elected.	▌ ✓ John Olver (Democratic) 99.0%
Massachusetts 2	Richard Neal	Democratic	1988	Incumbent re-elected.	▌ ✓ Richard Neal (Democratic) 98.7%
Massachusetts 3	Jim McGovern	Democratic	1996	Incumbent re-elected.	▌ ✓ Jim McGovern (Democratic) 70.5%; ▌Ron Crews (Republican) 29.5%
Massachusetts 4	Barney Frank	Democratic	1980	Incumbent re-elected.	▌ ✓ Barney Frank (Democratic) 77.9%; ▌Chuck Morse (Independent) 22.1%
Massachusetts 5	Marty Meehan	Democratic	1992	Incumbent re-elected.	▌ ✓ Marty Meehan (Democratic) 67.1%; ▌Thomas P. Tierney (Republican) 32.9%
Massachusetts 6	John F. Tierney	Democratic	1996	Incumbent re-elected.	▌ ✓ John F. Tierney (Democratic) 70.0%; ▌Steve O'Malley (Republican) 30.0%
Massachusetts 7	Ed Markey	Democratic	1976	Incumbent re-elected.	▌ ✓ Ed Markey (Democratic) 73.6%; ▌Kenneth Chase (Republican) 22.0%; ▌Jim Hall (Independent) 4.4%
Massachusetts 8	Mike Capuano	Democratic	1998	Incumbent re-elected.	▌ ✓ Mike Capuano (Democratic) 98.7%
Massachusetts 9	Stephen Lynch	Democratic	2001 (special)	Incumbent re-elected.	▌ ✓ Stephen Lynch (Democratic) 99.0%
Massachusetts 10	Bill Delahunt	Democratic	1996	Incumbent re-elected.	▌ ✓ Bill Delahunt (Democratic) 65.9%; ▌Mike Jones (Republican) 34.1%

== Michigan ==
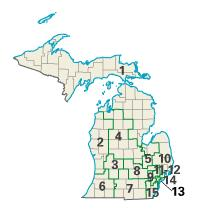
Michigan districts in these elections

District	Incumbent	Party	First elected	Result	Candidates
Michigan 1	Bart Stupak	Democratic	1992	Incumbent re-elected.	▌ ✓ Bart Stupak (Democratic) 65.6%; ▌Don Hooper (Republican) 32.7%; ▌David J. Newland (Green) 1.0%; ▌John W. Loosemore (Libertarian) 0.7%
Michigan 2	Pete Hoekstra	Republican	1992	Incumbent re-elected.	▌ ✓ Pete Hoekstra (Republican) 69.3%; ▌Kimon Kotos (Democratic) 28.9%; ▌Steven Van Til (Libertarian) 0.9%; ▌Ronald E. Graeser (US Taxpayers) 0.8%
Michigan 3	Vern Ehlers	Republican	1993 (special)	Incumbent re-elected.	▌ ✓ Vern Ehlers (Republican) 66.6%; ▌Peter H. Hickey](Democratic) 31.5%; ▌Warren Adams (Libertarian) 1.1%; ▌Marcel J. Sales (US Taxpayers) 0.8%
Michigan 4	Dave Camp	Republican	1990	Incumbent re-elected.	▌ ✓ Dave Camp (Republican) 64.3%; ▌Mike Huckleberry (Democratic) 34.8%; ▌Albert Chia Jr. (Libertarian) 0.9%
Michigan 5	Dale Kildee	Democratic	1976	Incumbent re-elected.	▌ ✓ Dale Kildee (Democratic) 67.2%; ▌Myrah Kirkwood (Republican) 31.3%; ▌Harley Mikkelson (Green) 0.8%; ▌Clint Foster (Libertarian) 0.7%
Michigan 6	Fred Upton	Republican	1986	Incumbent re-elected.	▌ ✓ Fred Upton (Republican) 65.3%; ▌Scott Elliott (Democratic) 32.4%; ▌Randall MacPhee (Green) 0.8%; ▌Erwin J. Haas (Libertarian) 0.8%; ▌W. Dennis FitzSimons (US Taxpayers) 0.7%
Michigan 7	Nick Smith	Republican	1992	Incumbent retired. Republican hold.	▌ ✓ Joe Schwarz (Republican) 58.4%; ▌Sharon Marie Renier (Democratic) 36.3%; ▌David Horn (US Taxpayers) 3.0%; ▌Jason Seagraves (Green) 1.3%; ▌Kenneth L. Proctor (Libertarian) 1.0%
Michigan 8	Mike Rogers	Republican	2000	Incumbent re-elected.	▌ ✓ Mike Rogers (Republican) 61.1%; ▌Robert D. Alexander (Democratic) 36.9%; ▌Will Tyler White (Libertarian) 1.0%; ▌John Mangopoulos (US Taxpayers) 1.0%
Michigan 9	Joe Knollenberg	Republican	1992	Incumbent re-elected.	▌ ✓ Joe Knollenberg (Republican) 58.5%; ▌Steven W. Reifman (Democratic) 39.5%; ▌Robert W. Schubring (Libertarian) 2.0%
Michigan 10	Candice Miller	Republican	2002	Incumbent re-elected.	▌ ✓ Candice Miller (Republican) 68.6%; ▌Rob Casey (Democratic) 29.5%; ▌Phoebe A. Basso (Libertarian) 1.2%; ▌Anthony America (Independent) 0.7%
Michigan 11	Thaddeus McCotter	Republican	2002	Incumbent re-elected.	▌ ✓ Thaddeus McCotter (Republican) 57.0%; ▌Phillip S. Truran (Democratic) 41.0%; ▌Charles L. Basso Jr. (Libertarian) 2.0%
Michigan 12	Sander Levin	Democratic	1982	Incumbent re-elected.	▌ ✓ Sander Levin (Democratic) 69.3%; ▌Randell J. Shafer (Republican) 29.0%; ▌Dick Gach (Libertarian) 1.7%
Michigan 13	Carolyn Cheeks Kilpatrick	Democratic	1996	Incumbent re-elected.	▌ ✓ Carolyn Cheeks Kilpatrick (Democratic) 78.2%; ▌Cynthia Cassell (Republican) 18.5%; ▌Thomas Levigne (Green) 1.9%; ▌Eric Gordon (Libertarian) 1.4%
Michigan 14	John Conyers Jr.	Democratic	1964	Incumbent re-elected.	▌ ✓ John Conyers Jr. (Democratic) 83.9%; ▌Veronica Pedraza (Republican) 13.8%; ▌Michael L. Donahue (Libertarian) 0.9%; ▌Lisa Weltman (Green) 0.9%; ▌Wilbert Sears (US Taxpayers) 0.5%
Michigan 15	John Dingell Jr.	Democratic	1955 (special)	Incumbent re-elected.	▌ ✓ John Dingell Jr. (Democratic) 70.9%; ▌Dawn Anne Reamer (Republican) 26.6%; ▌Gregory Scott Stempfle (Libertarian) 1.1%; ▌Mike Eller (US Taxpayers) 0.8%; ▌Jerome S. White (Independent) 0.6%

== Minnesota ==
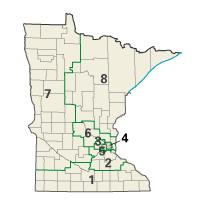
Minnesota districts in these elections

All incumbents were re-elected.

District	Incumbent	Party	First elected	Result	Candidates
Minnesota 1	Gil Gutknecht	Republican	1994	Incumbent re-elected.	▌ ✓ Gil Gutknecht (Republican) 59.6%; ▌Leigh Pomeroy (DFL) 35.5%; ▌Gregory Mikkelson (Independence) 4.8%
Minnesota 2	John Kline	Republican	2002	Incumbent re-elected.	▌ ✓ John Kline (Republican) 56.4%; ▌Teresa Daly (DFL) 40.3%; ▌Doug Williams (Independence) 3.2%
Minnesota 3	Jim Ramstad	Republican	1990	Incumbent re-elected.	▌ ✓ Jim Ramstad (Republican) 64.6%; ▌Deborah Watts (Democratic) 35.3%
Minnesota 4	Betty McCollum	DFL	2000	Incumbent re-elected.	▌ ✓ Betty McCollum (DFL) 57.5%; ▌Patrice Bataglia (Republican) 33.2%; ▌Peter Vento (Independence) 9.2%
Minnesota 5	Martin Olav Sabo	DFL	1978	Incumbent re-elected.	▌ ✓ Martin Olav Sabo (DFL) 69.7%; ▌Daniel Mathias (Republican) 24.4%; ▌Jay Pond (Green) 5.7%
Minnesota 6	Mark Kennedy	Republican	2000	Incumbent re-elected.	▌ ✓ Mark Kennedy (Republican) 54.0%; ▌Patty Wetterling (DFL) 45.9%
Minnesota 7	Collin Peterson	DFL	1990	Incumbent re-elected.	▌ ✓ Collin Peterson (DFL) 66.1%; ▌David Sturrock (Republican) 33.8%
Minnesota 8	Jim Oberstar	DFL	1974	Incumbent re-elected.	▌ ✓ Jim Oberstar (DFL) 65.2%; ▌Mark Groettum (Republican) 32.2%; ▌Van Presley (Green) 2.6%

== Mississippi ==
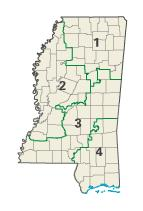
Mississippi districts in these elections

District	Incumbent	Party	First elected	Result	Candidates
Mississippi 1	Roger Wicker	Republican	1994	Incumbent re-elected.	▌ ✓ Roger Wicker (Republican) 79.0%; ▌Barbara Dale Washer (Reform) 21.0%
Mississippi 2	Bennie Thompson	Democratic	1993 (special)	Incumbent re-elected.	▌ ✓ Bennie Thompson (Democratic) 58.4%; ▌Clinton LeSueur (Republican) 40.6%; ▌Shawn O'Hara (Reform) 1.0%
Mississippi 3	Chip Pickering	Republican	1996	Incumbent re-elected.	▌ ✓ Chip Pickering (Republican) 80.0%; ▌Jim Giles (Independent) 13.8%; ▌Lamonica L. McGee (Reform) 6.2%
Mississippi 4	Gene Taylor	Democratic	1989 (special)	Incumbent re-elected.	▌ ✓ Gene Taylor (Democratic) 64.2%; ▌Mike Lott (Republican) 34.5%; ▌Tracella Hill (Reform) 1.3%

== Missouri ==
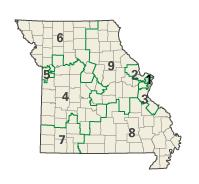
Missouri districts in these elections

District	Incumbent	Party	First elected	Result	Candidates
Missouri 1	Lacy Clay	Democratic	2000	Incumbent re-elected.	▌ ✓ Lacy Clay (Democratic) 75.3%; ▌Leslie L. Farr II (Republican) 22.8%; ▌Terry Chadwick (Libertarian) 1.4%; ▌Robert Rehbein (Constitution) 0.5%
Missouri 2	Todd Akin	Republican	2000	Incumbent re-elected.	▌ ✓ Todd Akin (Republican) 65.4%; ▌George D. Weber (Democratic) 33.0%; ▌Darla Maloney (Libertarian) 1.4%; ▌David Leefe (Constitution) 0.3%
Missouri 3	Dick Gephardt	Democratic	1976	Incumbent retired. Democratic hold.	▌ ✓ Russ Carnahan (Democratic) 52.9%; ▌Bill Federer (Republican) 45.1%; ▌Kevin C. Babcock (Libertarian) 1.6%; ▌William Renaud (Constitution) 0.4%
Missouri 4	Ike Skelton	Democratic	1976	Incumbent re-elected.	▌ ✓ Ike Skelton (Democratic) 66.2%; ▌Jim Noland (Republican) 32.4%; ▌Bill Lower (Libertarian) 1.0%; ▌Raymond Lister (Constitution) 0.4%
Missouri 5	Karen McCarthy	Democratic	1994	Incumbent retired. Democratic hold.	▌ ✓ Emanuel Cleaver (Democratic) 55.2%; ▌Jeanne Patterson (Republican) 42.1%; ▌Rick Bailie (Libertarian) 2.0%; ▌Darin Rodenberg (Constitution) 0.7%
Missouri 6	Sam Graves	Republican	2000	Incumbent re-elected.	▌ ✓ Sam Graves (Republican) 63.8%; ▌Charles S. Broomfield (Democratic) 34.8%; ▌Erik Buck (Libertarian) 1.4%
Missouri 7	Roy Blunt	Republican	1996	Incumbent re-elected.	▌ ✓ Roy Blunt (Republican) 70.4%; ▌Jim Newberry (Democratic) 28.3%; ▌Kevin Craig (Libertarian) 0.9%; ▌Steve Alger (Constitution) 0.3%
Missouri 8	Jo Ann Emerson	Republican	1996	Incumbent re-elected.	▌ ✓ Jo Ann Emerson (Republican) 72.2%; ▌Dean Henderson (Democratic) 26.6%; ▌Stan Cuff (Libertarian) 0.7%; ▌Leonard Davidson (Constitution) 0.5%
Missouri 9	Kenny Hulshof	Republican	1996	Incumbent re-elected.	▌ ✓ Kenny Hulshof (Republican) 64.6%; ▌Linda Jacobsen (Democratic) 33.8%; ▌Tamara A. Millay (Libertarian) 1.1%; ▌Chris Earl (Constitution) 0.5%

== Montana ==
District	Incumbent	Party	First elected	Result	Candidates
Montana at-large	Denny Rehberg	Republican	2000	Incumbent re-elected.	▌ ✓ Denny Rehberg (Republican) 64.4%; ▌Tracy Velazquez (Democratic) 32.8%; ▌Mike Fellows (Libertarian) 2.8%

== Nebraska ==
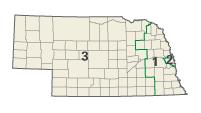
Nebraska districts in these elections

District	Incumbent	Party	First elected	Result	Candidates
Nebraska 1	Vacant			Doug Bereuter (R) resigned August 31, 2004. Republican hold.	▌ ✓ Jeff Fortenberry (Republican) 54.2%; ▌Matt Connealy (Democratic) 43.0%; ▌Steve Larrick (Green) 2.8%
Nebraska 2	Lee Terry	Republican	1998	Incumbent re-elected.	▌ ✓ Lee Terry (Republican) 61.1%; ▌Nancy Thompson (Democratic) 36.1%; ▌Jack Graziano (Libertarian) 1.9%; ▌Dante Salvatierra (Green) 0.9%
Nebraska 3	Tom Osborne	Republican	2000	Incumbent re-elected.	▌ ✓ Tom Osborne (Republican) 87.5%; ▌Donna Anderson (Democratic) 10.5%; ▌Joseph Rosberg (Nebraska) 1.4%; ▌Roy Guisinger (Green) 0.6%

== Nevada ==
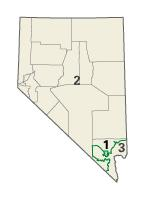
Nevada districts in these elections

District	Incumbent	Party	First elected	Result	Candidates
Nevada 1	Shelley Berkley	Democratic	1998	Incumbent re-elected.	▌ ✓ Shelley Berkley (Democratic) 66.0%; ▌Russ Mickelson (Republican) 31.1%; ▌Jim Duensing (Libertarian) 2.9%
Nevada 2	Jim Gibbons	Republican	1996	Incumbent re-elected.	▌ ✓ Jim Gibbons (Republican) 66.5%; ▌Angie Cochran (Democratic) 27.9%; ▌Janine Hansen (Independent American) 3.6%; ▌Brendan Trainor (Libertarian) 1.7%
Nevada 3	Jon Porter	Republican	2002	Incumbent re-elected.	▌ ✓ Jon Porter (Republican) 54.5%; ▌Tom Gallagher (Democratic) 40.4%; ▌Joseph Silvestri (Libertarian) 3.1%; ▌Richard O'Dell (Independent) 2.0%

== New Hampshire ==
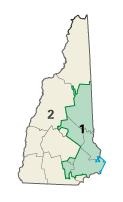
New Hampshire districts in these elections

District	Incumbent	Party	First elected	Result	Candidates
New Hampshire 1	Jeb Bradley	Republican	2002	Incumbent re-elected.	▌ ✓ Jeb Bradley (Republican) 63.4%; ▌Justin Nadeau (Democratic) 36.6%
New Hampshire 2	Charlie Bass	Republican	1994	Incumbent re-elected.	▌ ✓ Charlie Bass (Republican) 58.3%; ▌Paul Hodes (Democratic) 38.2%; ▌Richard Kahn (Libertarian) 3.5%

== New Jersey ==
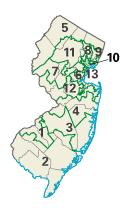
New Jersey districts in these elections

District	Incumbent	Party	First elected	Result	Candidates
New Jersey 1	Rob Andrews	Democratic	1990	Incumbent re-elected.	▌ ✓ Rob Andrews (Democratic) 75.0%; ▌Dan Hutchison (Republican) 24.7%; ▌Arturo Croce (Independent) 0.3%
New Jersey 2	Frank LoBiondo	Republican	1994	Incumbent re-elected.	▌ ✓ Frank LoBiondo (Republican) 65.1%; ▌Timothy Robb (Democratic) 32.7%; ▌Willie Norwood (Independent) 0.7%; ▌Michael J. Matthews (Libertarian) 0.7%; ▌Jose Alcantara (Independent) 0.6%; ▌Constantino Rozzo (Socialist) 0.2%
New Jersey 3	Jim Saxton	Republican	1984	Incumbent re-elected.	▌ ✓ Jim Saxton (Republican) 63.4%; ▌Herb Conaway (Democratic) 34.7%; ▌Ed Forchion (Independent) 1.6%; ▌Frank Orland (Libertarian) 0.3%
New Jersey 4	Chris Smith	Republican	1980	Incumbent re-elected.	▌ ✓ Chris Smith (Republican) 67.0%; ▌Amy Vasquez (Democratic) 32.3%; ▌Richard Edgar (Libertarian) 0.7%
New Jersey 5	Scott Garrett	Republican	2002	Incumbent re-elected.	▌ ✓ Scott Garrett (Republican) 57.6%; ▌Dorothea Wolfe (Democratic) 41.1%; ▌Victor Kaplan (Libertarian) 0.6%; ▌Thomas Phelan (Conservative) 0.5%; ▌Greg Pason (Socialist) 0.2%
New Jersey 6	Frank Pallone	Democratic	1988	Incumbent re-elected.	▌ ✓ Frank Pallone (Democratic) 66.9%; ▌Sylvester Fernandez (Republican) 30.8%; ▌Virginia Flynn (Libertarian) 1.2%; ▌Mac Dara Lyden (Independent) 1.0%
New Jersey 7	Mike Ferguson	Republican	2000	Incumbent re-elected.	▌ ✓ Mike Ferguson (Republican) 56.9%; ▌Steve Brozak (Democratic) 41.7%; ▌Thomas Abrams (Libertarian) 0.7%; ▌Matthew Williams (Independent) 0.7%
New Jersey 8	Bill Pascrell	Democratic	1996	Incumbent re-elected.	▌ ✓ Bill Pascrell (Democratic) 69.5%; ▌George Ajjan (Republican) 28.7%; ▌Joseph Fortunato (Green) 1.8%
New Jersey 9	Steve Rothman	Democratic	1996	Incumbent re-elected.	▌ ✓ Steve Rothman (Democratic) 67.5%; ▌Ed Trawinski (Republican) 31.7%; ▌David Daly (Libertarian) 0.8%
New Jersey 10	Donald M. Payne	Democratic	1988	Incumbent re-elected.	▌ ✓ Donald M. Payne (Democratic) 96.9%; ▌Toy-Ling Washington (Green) 1.8%; ▌Sara Lobman (Independent) 1.3%
New Jersey 11	Rodney Frelinghuysen	Republican	1994	Incumbent re-elected.	▌ ✓ Rodney Frelinghuysen (Republican) 67.9%; ▌James Buell (Democratic) 31.0%; ▌John Mele (Independent) 0.6%; ▌Austin Lett (Libertarian) 0.5%
New Jersey 12	Rush Holt Jr.	Democratic	1998	Incumbent re-elected.	▌ ✓ Rush Holt Jr. (Democratic) 59.3%; ▌Bill Spadea (Republican) 39.7%; ▌Ken Chazotte (Libertarian) 0.5%; ▌Daryl Brooks (Green) 0.5%
New Jersey 13	Bob Menendez	Democratic	1992	Incumbent re-elected.	▌ ✓ Bob Menendez (Democratic) 75.8%; ▌Richard Piatkowski (Republican) 22.1%; ▌Dick Hester (Independent) 0.8%; ▌Herbert H. Shaw (Independent) 0.7%; ▌Angela Lariscy (Socialist Workers) 0.6%

== New Mexico ==
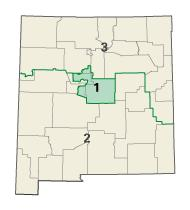
New Mexico districts in these elections

District	Incumbent	Party	First elected	Result	Candidates
New Mexico 1	Heather Wilson	Republican	1998	Incumbent re-elected.	▌ ✓ Heather Wilson (Republican) 54.4%; ▌Richard M. Romero (Democratic) 45.6%
New Mexico 2	Steve Pearce	Republican	2002	Incumbent re-elected.	▌ ✓ Steve Pearce (Republican) 60.2%; ▌Gary King (Democratic) 39.8%
New Mexico 3	Tom Udall	Democratic	1998	Incumbent re-elected.	▌ ✓ Tom Udall (Democratic) 68.7%; ▌Gregory Tucker (Republican) 31.3%

== New York ==
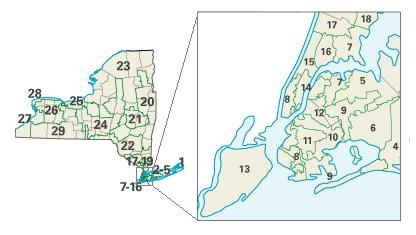
New York districts in these elections

District	Incumbent	Party	First elected	Result	Candidates
New York 1	Tim Bishop	Democratic	2002	Incumbent re-elected.	▌ ✓ Tim Bishop (Democratic) 56.2%; ▌Bill Manger (Republican) 43.8%
New York 2	Steve Israel	Democratic	2000	Incumbent re-elected.	▌ ✓ Steve Israel (Democratic) 66.6%; ▌Richard A. Hoffman (Republican) 33.4%
New York 3	Peter King	Republican	1992	Incumbent re-elected.	▌ ✓ Peter King (Republican) 63.0%; ▌Blair Mathies (Democratic) 37.0%
New York 4	Carolyn McCarthy	Democratic	1996	Incumbent re-elected.	▌ ✓ Carolyn McCarthy (Democratic) 63.0%; ▌James Garner (Republican) 37.0%
New York 5	Gary Ackerman	Democratic	1983 (special)	Incumbent re-elected.	▌ ✓ Gary Ackerman (Democratic) 71.3%; ▌Stephen Graves (Republican) 27.9%; ▌Jun Policarpio (Independent) 0.7%
New York 6	Gregory Meeks	Democratic	1998	Incumbent re-elected.	▌ ✓ Gregory Meeks (Democratic) uncontested
New York 7	Joseph Crowley	Democratic	1998	Incumbent re-elected.	▌ ✓ Joseph Crowley (Democratic) 80.9%; ▌Joseph Cinquemain (Republican) 19.1%
New York 8	Jerry Nadler	Democratic	1992	Incumbent re-elected.	▌ ✓ Jerry Nadler (Democratic) 80.5%; ▌Peter Hort (Republican) 19.5%
New York 9	Anthony Weiner	Democratic	1998	Incumbent re-elected.	▌ ✓ Anthony Weiner (Democratic) 71.3%; ▌Gerald J. Cronin (Republican) 28.7%
New York 10	Edolphus Towns	Democratic	1982	Incumbent re-elected.	▌ ✓ Edolphus Towns (Democratic) 91.5%; ▌Harvey R. Clarke (Republican) 7.5%; ▌Mariana Blume (Conservative) 1.0%
New York 11	Major Owens	Democratic	1982	Incumbent re-elected.	▌ ✓ Major Owens (Democratic) 94.0%; ▌Sol Lieberman (Conservative) 3.1%; ▌Lorraine Stevens (Independent) 2.9%
New York 12	Nydia Velázquez	Democratic	1992	Incumbent re-elected.	▌ ✓ Nydia Velázquez (Democratic) 86.3%; ▌Paul A. Rodriguez (Republican) 13.7%
New York 13	Vito Fossella	Republican	1997 (special)	Incumbent re-elected.	▌ ✓ Vito Fossella (Republican) 59.0%; ▌Frank J. Barbaro (Democratic) 41.0%
New York 14	Carolyn Maloney	Democratic	1992	Incumbent re-elected.	▌ ✓ Carolyn Maloney (Democratic) 81.1%; ▌Anton Srdanovic (Republican) 18.9%
New York 15	Charles Rangel	Democratic	1970	Incumbent re-elected.	▌ ✓ Charles Rangel (Democratic) 91.1%; ▌Kenneth P. Jefferson Jr. (Republican) 7.0%; ▌Jessie A. Fields (Independent) 1.9%
New York 16	José E. Serrano	Democratic	1990	Incumbent re-elected.	▌ ✓ José E. Serrano (Democratic) 95.2%; ▌Ali Mohamed (Republican) 4.8%
New York 17	Eliot Engel	Democratic	1988	Incumbent re-elected.	▌ ✓ Eliot Engel (Democratic) 76.1%; ▌Matthew I. Brennan (Republican) 22.0%; ▌Kevin Brawley (Conservative) 1.9%
New York 18	Nita Lowey	Democratic	1988	Incumbent re-elected.	▌ ✓ Nita Lowey (Democratic) 69.8%; ▌Richard A. Hoffman (Republican) 30.2%
New York 19	Sue Kelly	Republican	1994	Incumbent re-elected.	▌ ✓ Sue Kelly (Republican) 66.7%; ▌Michael Jalamin (Democratic) 33.3%
New York 20	John E. Sweeney	Republican	1998	Incumbent re-elected.	▌ ✓ John E. Sweeney (Republican) 65.8%; ▌Doris F. Kelly (Democratic) 33.7%; ▌Morris N. Guller (Independent) 0.5%
New York 21	Michael McNulty	Democratic	1988	Incumbent re-elected.	▌ ✓ Michael McNulty (Democratic) 70.8%; ▌Warren Redlich (Republican) 29.2%
New York 22	Maurice Hinchey	Democratic	1992	Incumbent re-elected.	▌ ✓ Maurice Hinchey (Democratic) 67.2%; ▌William Brenner (Republican) 32.8%
New York 23	John M. McHugh	Republican	1992	Incumbent re-elected.	▌ ✓ John M. McHugh (Republican) 70.7%; ▌Robert J. Johnson (Democratic) 29.3%
New York 24	Sherwood Boehlert	Republican	1982	Incumbent re-elected.	▌ ✓ Sherwood Boehlert (Republican) 56.9%; ▌Jeffrey A. Miller (Democratic) 33.9%; ▌David L. Walrath (Conservative) 9.2%
New York 25	James T. Walsh	Republican	1988	Incumbent re-elected.	▌ ✓ James T. Walsh (Republican) 90.4%; ▌Christina Rosetti (Independent) 9.6%
New York 26	Thomas M. Reynolds	Republican	1998	Incumbent re-elected.	▌ ✓ Thomas M. Reynolds (Republican) 55.6%; ▌Jack Davis (Democratic) 44.4%
New York 27	Jack Quinn	Republican	1992	Incumbent retired. Democratic gain.	▌ ✓ Brian Higgins (Democratic) 50.7%; ▌Nancy Naples (Republican) 49.3%
New York 28	Louise Slaughter	Democratic	1986	Incumbent re-elected.	▌ ✓ Louise Slaughter (Democratic) 72.6%; ▌Mike Laba (Republican) 24.8%; ▌Francina Joyce Cartonia (Independent) 2.6%
New York 29	Amo Houghton	Republican	1986	Incumbent retired. Republican hold.	▌ ✓ Randy Kuhl (Republican) 50.7%; ▌Samara Barend (Democratic) 40.8%; ▌Mark Assini (Conservative) 6.4%; ▌John Ciampioli (Independent) 2.1%

== North Carolina ==
North Carolina districts in these elections

District	Incumbent	Party	First elected	Result	Candidates
North Carolina 1	G. K. Butterfield	Democratic	2004	Incumbent re-elected.	▌ ✓ G. K. Butterfield (Democratic) 64.0%; ▌Greg Dority (Republican) 36.0%
North Carolina 2	Bob Etheridge	Democratic	1996	Incumbent re-elected.	▌ ✓ Bob Etheridge (Democratic) 62.2%; ▌Billy J. Creech (Republican) 37.8%
North Carolina 3	Walter B. Jones Jr.	Republican	1994	Incumbent re-elected.	▌ ✓ Walter B. Jones Jr. (Republican) 70.7%; ▌Roger Eaton (Democratic) 29.3%
North Carolina 4	David Price	Democratic	1986; 1994 (defeated); 1996	Incumbent re-elected.	▌ ✓ David Price (Democratic) 64.1%; ▌Todd Batchelor (Republican) 35.9%
North Carolina 5	Richard Burr	Republican	1994	Incumbent retired to run for U.S. Senator. Republican hold.	▌ ✓ Virginia Foxx (Republican) 58.8%; ▌Jim Harrell Jr. (Democratic) 41.2%
North Carolina 6	Howard Coble	Republican	1984	Incumbent re-elected.	▌ ✓ Howard Coble (Republican) 73.1%; ▌William Jordan (Democratic) 26.9%
North Carolina 7	Mike McIntyre	Democratic	1996	Incumbent re-elected.	▌ ✓ Mike McIntyre (Democratic) 73.2%; ▌Ken Plonk (Republican) 26.8%
North Carolina 8	Robin Hayes	Republican	1998	Incumbent re-elected.	▌ ✓ Robin Hayes (Republican) 55.5%; ▌Beth Troutman (Democratic) 44.5%
North Carolina 9	Sue Myrick	Republican	1994	Incumbent re-elected.	▌ ✓ Sue Myrick (Republican) 70.2%; ▌Jack Flynn (Democratic) 29.8%
North Carolina 10	Cass Ballenger	Republican	1986	Incumbent retired. Republican hold.	▌ ✓ Patrick McHenry (Republican) 64.1%; ▌Anne Fischer (Democratic) 35.9%
North Carolina 11	Charles H. Taylor	Republican	1990	Incumbent re-elected.	▌ ✓ Charles H. Taylor (Republican) 54.9%; ▌Patsy Keever (Democratic) 45.1%
North Carolina 12	Mel Watt	Democratic	1992	Incumbent re-elected.	▌ ✓ Mel Watt (Democratic) 66.8%; ▌Ada Fisher (Republican) 33.2%
North Carolina 13	Brad Miller	Democratic	2002	Incumbent re-elected.	▌ ✓ Brad Miller (Democratic) 58.8%; ▌Virginia Johnson (Republican) 41.2%

== North Dakota ==
District	Incumbent	Party	First elected	Result	Candidates
North Dakota at-large	Earl Pomeroy	Democratic-NPL	1992	Incumbent re-elected.	▌ ✓ Earl Pomeroy (Democratic-NPL) 59.6%; ▌Duane Sand (Republican) 40.4%

== Ohio ==
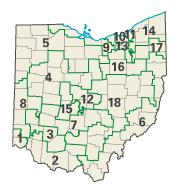
Ohio districts in these elections

District	Incumbent	Party	First elected	Result	Candidates
Ohio 1	Steve Chabot	Republican	1994	Incumbent re-elected.	▌ ✓ Steve Chabot (Republican) 59.8%; ▌Greg Harris (Democratic) 40.1%
Ohio 2	Rob Portman	Republican	1993 (special)	Incumbent re-elected.	▌ ✓ Rob Portman (Republican) 71.7%; ▌Charles W. Sanders (Democratic) 28.3%
Ohio 3	Mike Turner	Republican	2002	Incumbent re-elected.	▌ ✓ Mike Turner (Republican) 62.3%; ▌L. Jane Mitakides (Democratic) 37.7%
Ohio 4	Mike Oxley	Republican	1981 (special)	Incumbent re-elected.	▌ ✓ Mike Oxley (Republican) 58.6%; ▌Ben Konop (Democratic) 41.4%
Ohio 5	Paul Gillmor	Republican	1988	Incumbent re-elected.	▌ ✓ Paul Gillmor (Republican) 67.1%; ▌Robin Weirauch (Democratic) 32.9%
Ohio 6	Ted Strickland	Democratic	1992; 1994 (defeated); 1996	Incumbent re-elected.	▌ ✓ Ted Strickland (Democratic) Uncontested
Ohio 7	Dave Hobson	Republican	1990	Incumbent re-elected.	▌ ✓ Dave Hobson (Republican) 65.0%; ▌Kara Anastasio (Democratic) 35.0%
Ohio 8	John Boehner	Republican	1990	Incumbent re-elected.	▌ ✓ John Boehner (Republican) 69.0%; ▌Jeff Hardenbrook (Democratic) 31.0%
Ohio 9	Marcy Kaptur	Democratic	1982	Incumbent re-elected.	▌ ✓ Marcy Kaptur (Democratic) 68.1%; ▌Larry A. Kaczala (Republican) 31.9%
Ohio 10	Dennis Kucinich	Democratic	1996	Incumbent re-elected.	▌ ✓ Dennis Kucinich (Democratic) 60.0%; ▌Edward F. Herman (Republican) 33.6%; ▌Barbara Anne Ferris (Independent) 6.4%
Ohio 11	Stephanie Tubbs Jones	Democratic	1998	Incumbent re-elected.	▌ ✓ Stephanie Tubbs Jones (Democratic) Uncontested
Ohio 12	Pat Tiberi	Republican	2000	Incumbent re-elected.	▌ ✓ Pat Tiberi (Republican) 62.0%; ▌Edward S. Brown (Democratic) 38.0%
Ohio 13	Sherrod Brown	Democratic	1992	Incumbent re-elected.	▌ ✓ Sherrod Brown (Democratic) 67.4%; ▌Robert Lucas (Republican) 32.6%
Ohio 14	Steve LaTourette	Republican	1994	Incumbent re-elected.	▌ ✓ Steve LaTourette (Republican) 62.8%; ▌Capri Cafaro (Democratic) 37.2%
Ohio 15	Deborah Pryce	Republican	1992	Incumbent re-elected.	▌ ✓ Deborah Pryce (Republican) 60.0%; ▌Mark P. Brown (Democratic) 40.0%
Ohio 16	Ralph Regula	Republican	1972	Incumbent re-elected.	▌ ✓ Ralph Regula (Republican) 66.6%; ▌Jeff Seemann (Democratic) 33.4%
Ohio 17	Tim Ryan	Democratic	2002	Incumbent re-elected.	▌ ✓ Tim Ryan (Democratic) 77.2%; ▌Frank V. Cusimano (Republican) 22.8%
Ohio 18	Bob Ney	Republican	1994	Incumbent re-elected.	▌ ✓ Bob Ney (Republican) 66.2%; ▌Brian R. Thomas (Democratic) 33.8%

== Oklahoma ==
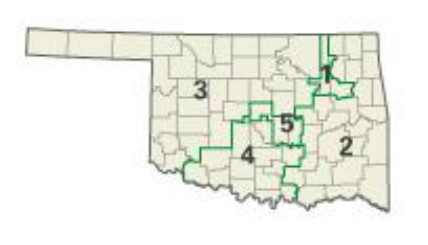
Oklahoma districts in these elections

District	Incumbent	Party	First elected	Result	Candidates
Oklahoma 1	John Sullivan	Republican	2002	Incumbent re-elected.	▌ ✓ John Sullivan (Republican) 60.2%; ▌Doug Dodd (Democratic) 37.5%; ▌John Krymski (Independent) 2.3%
Oklahoma 2	Brad Carson	Democratic	2000	Incumbent retired to run for U.S. Senator. Democratic hold.	▌ ✓ Dan Boren (Democratic) 65.9%; ▌Wayland Smalley (Republican) 34.1%
Oklahoma 3	Frank Lucas	Republican	1994	Incumbent re-elected.	▌ ✓ Frank Lucas (Republican) 82.2%; ▌Gregory Wilson (Independent) 17.8%
Oklahoma 4	Tom Cole	Republican	2002	Incumbent re-elected.	▌ ✓ Tom Cole (Republican) 77.8%; ▌Charlene K. Bradshaw (Independent) 22.2%
Oklahoma 5	Ernest Istook	Republican	1992	Incumbent re-elected.	▌ ✓ Ernest Istook (Republican) 66.1%; ▌Bert Smith (Democratic) 33.9%

== Oregon ==
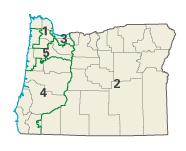
Oregon districts in these elections

District	Incumbent	Party	First elected	Result	Candidates
Oregon 1	David Wu	Democratic	1998	Incumbent re-elected.	▌ ✓ David Wu (Democratic) 57.8%; ▌Goli Ameri (Republican) 38.3%; ▌Dean Wolf (Independent) 3.9%
Oregon 2	Greg Walden	Republican	1998	Incumbent re-elected.	▌ ✓ Greg Walden (Republican) 71.7%; ▌John McColgan (Democratic) 25.7%; ▌Jim Lindsay (Libertarian) 1.4%; ▌Jack Alan Brown (Independent) 1.2%
Oregon 3	Earl Blumenauer	Democratic	1996	Incumbent re-elected.	▌ ✓ Earl Blumenauer (Democratic) 71.1%; ▌Tami Mars (Republican) 23.7%; ▌Walt Brown (Socialist) 3.1%; ▌Dale Winegarden (Independent) 2.1%
Oregon 4	Peter DeFazio	Democratic	1986	Incumbent re-elected.	▌ ✓ Peter DeFazio (Democratic) 61.0%; ▌Jim Feldkamp (Republican) 37.6%; ▌Jacob Boone (Libertarian) 0.9%; ▌Michael Paul Marsh (Constitution) 0.5%
Oregon 5	Darlene Hooley	Democratic	1996	Incumbent re-elected.	▌ ✓ Darlene Hooley (Democratic) 52.9%; ▌Jim Zupancic (Republican) 44.4%; ▌Jerry Defoe (Libertarian) 1.9%; ▌Joseph H. Bitz (Constitution) 0.8%

== Pennsylvania ==
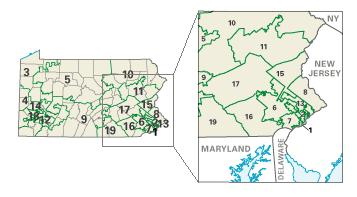
Pennsylvania districts in these elections

District	Incumbent	Party	First elected	Result	Candidates
Pennsylvania 1	Bob Brady	Democratic	1998	Incumbent re-elected.	▌ ✓ Bob Brady (Democratic) 86.3%; ▌Deborah Williams (Republican) 13.4%; ▌Christopher Randolph (Independent) 0.3%
Pennsylvania 2	Chaka Fattah	Democratic	1994	Incumbent re-elected.	▌ ✓ Chaka Fattah (Democratic) 88.0%; ▌Stewart Bolno (Republican) 12.0%
Pennsylvania 3	Phil English	Republican	1994	Incumbent re-elected.	▌ ✓ Phil English (Republican) 60.1%; ▌Steven Porter (Democratic) 39.9%
Pennsylvania 4	Melissa Hart	Republican	2000	Incumbent re-elected.	▌ ✓ Melissa Hart (Republican) 63.1%; ▌Stevan Drobac (Democratic) 35.9%; ▌Steven B. Larchuk (Independent) 1.0%
Pennsylvania 5	John Peterson	Republican	1996	Incumbent re-elected.	▌ ✓ John Peterson (Republican) 88.0%; ▌Tom Martin (Libertarian) 12.0%
Pennsylvania 6	Jim Gerlach	Republican	2002	Incumbent re-elected.	▌ ✓ Jim Gerlach (Republican) 51.0%; ▌Lois Murphy (Democratic) 49.0%
Pennsylvania 7	Curt Weldon	Republican	1986	Incumbent re-elected.	▌ ✓ Curt Weldon (Republican) 58.8%; ▌Paul Scoles (Democratic) 40.3%; ▌David R. Jahn (Libertarian) 0.9%
Pennsylvania 8	Jim Greenwood	Republican	1992	Incumbent retired. Republican hold.	▌ ✓ Mike Fitzpatrick (Republican) 55.3%; ▌Virginia Schrader (Democratic) 43.3%; ▌Arthur L. Farnsworth (Libertarian) 1.1%; ▌Erich Lukas (Constitution) 0.3%
Pennsylvania 9	Bill Shuster	Republican	2001 (special)	Incumbent re-elected.	▌ ✓ Bill Shuster (Republican) 69.5%; ▌Paul Politis (Democratic) 30.5%
Pennsylvania 10	Don Sherwood	Republican	1998	Incumbent re-elected.	▌ ✓ Don Sherwood (Republican) 92.8%; ▌Veronica Hannevig (Constitution) 7.2%
Pennsylvania 11	Paul Kanjorski	Democratic	1984	Incumbent re-elected.	▌ ✓ Paul Kanjorski (Democratic) 94.4%; ▌Kenneth Brenneman (Independent) 5.6%
Pennsylvania 12	John Murtha	Democratic	1974	Incumbent re-elected.	▌ ✓ John Murtha (Democratic) Uncontested
Pennsylvania 13	Joe Hoeffel	Democratic	1998	Incumbent retired to run for U.S. Senator. Democratic hold.	▌ ✓ Allyson Schwartz (Democratic) 55.7%; ▌Melissa Brown (Republican) 41.3%; ▌John McDermott (Constitution) 1.7%; ▌Chuck Moulton (Libertarian) 1.3%
Pennsylvania 14	Mike Doyle	Democratic	1994	Incumbent re-elected.	▌ ✓ Mike Doyle (Democratic) Uncontested
Pennsylvania 15	Pat Toomey	Republican	1998	Incumbent retired to run for U.S. Senator. Republican hold.	▌ ✓ Charlie Dent (Republican) 58.6%; ▌Joe Driscoll (Democratic) 39.4%; ▌Rich Piotrowski (Libertarian) 1.3%; ▌Greta Browne (Green) 0.8%
Pennsylvania 16	Joe Pitts	Republican	1996	Incumbent re-elected.	▌ ✓ Joe Pitts (Republican) 64.4%; ▌Lois Herr (Democratic) 34.5%; ▌Bob Hagen (Green) 1.1%
Pennsylvania 17	Tim Holden	Democratic	1992	Incumbent re-elected.	▌ ✓ Tim Holden (Democratic) 59.1%; ▌Scott Paterno (Republican) 38.9%; ▌Russ Diamond (Libertarian) 2.0%
Pennsylvania 18	Tim Murphy	Republican	2002	Incumbent re-elected.	▌ ✓ Tim Murphy (Republican) 62.8%; ▌Mark Boles (Democratic) 37.2%
Pennsylvania 19	Todd Platts	Republican	2000	Incumbent re-elected.	▌ ✓ Todd Platts (Republican) 91.5%; ▌Charles J. Steel (Green) 3.6%; ▌Michael L. Paoletta (Libertarian) 3.5%; ▌Lester B. Searer (Constitution) 1.4%

== Rhode Island ==
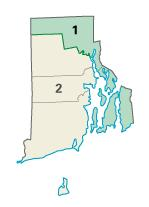
Rhode Island districts in these elections

District	Incumbent	Party	First elected	Result	Candidates
Rhode Island 1	Patrick Kennedy	Democratic	1994	Incumbent re-elected.	▌ ✓ Patrick J. Kennedy (Democratic) 64.1%; ▌David Rogers (Republican) 35.8%
Rhode Island 2	James Langevin	Democratic	2000	Incumbent re-elected.	▌ ✓ James Langevin (Democratic) 74.5%; ▌Arthur Barton (Republican) 20.8%; ▌Edward Morabito (Independent) 3.0%; ▌Dorman J. Hayes (Socialist) 1.6%

== South Carolina ==
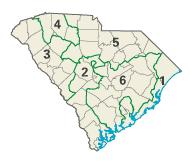
South Carolina districts in these elections

District	Incumbent	Party	First elected	Result	Candidates
South Carolina 1	Henry Brown	Republican	2000	Incumbent re-elected.	▌ ✓ Henry Brown (Republican) 87.9%; ▌James Dunn (Green) 12.1%
South Carolina 2	Joe Wilson	Republican	2001 (special)	Incumbent re-elected.	▌ ✓ Joe Wilson (Republican) 65.1%; ▌Michael Ray Ellisor (Democratic) 33.3%; ▌Steve Lefemine (Constitution) 1.6%
South Carolina 3	Gresham Barrett	Republican	2002	Incumbent re-elected.	▌ ✓ Gresham Barrett (Republican) Uncontested
South Carolina 4	Jim DeMint	Republican	1998	Incumbent retired to run for U.S. Senator. Republican hold.	▌ ✓ Bob Inglis (Republican) 69.8%; ▌Brandon Brown (Democratic) 29.0%; ▌C. Faye Walters (Green) 1.2%
South Carolina 5	John Spratt	Democratic	1982	Incumbent re-elected.	▌ ✓ John Spratt (Democratic) 63.1%; ▌Albert Spencer (Republican) 36.9%
South Carolina 6	Jim Clyburn	Democratic	1992	Incumbent re-elected.	▌ ✓ Jim Clyburn (Democratic) 67.0%; ▌Gary McLeod (Republican) 31.2%; ▌Other (Constitution) 1.7%

== South Dakota ==
District	Incumbent	Party	First elected	Result	Candidates
South Dakota at-large	Stephanie Herseth	Democratic	2004 (special)	Incumbent re-elected.	▌ ✓ Stephanie Herseth (Democratic) 53.4%; ▌Larry Diedrich (Republican) 45.9%; ▌Terry Begay (Libertarian) 0.7%

== Tennessee ==
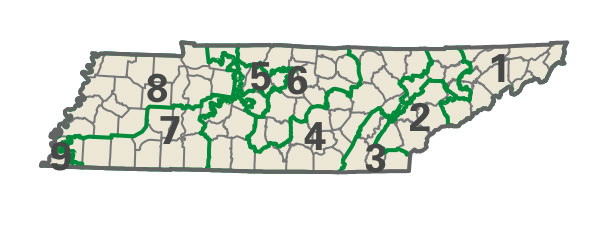
Tennessee districts in these elections

District	Incumbent	Party	First elected	Result	Candidates
Tennessee 1	William L. Jenkins	Republican	1996	Incumbent re-elected.	▌ ✓ William L. Jenkins (Republican) 73.9%; ▌Graham Leonard (Democratic) 24.1%; ▌Ralph Ball (Independent) 1.3%; ▌Michael Peavler (Independent) 0.7%
Tennessee 2	Jimmy Duncan	Republican	1998	Incumbent re-elected.	▌ ✓ Jimmy Duncan (Republican) 79.1%; ▌John Greene (Democratic) 19.1%; ▌Charles Howard (Independent) 1.8%
Tennessee 3	Zach Wamp	Republican	1994	Incumbent re-elected.	▌ ✓ Zach Wamp (Republican) 64.7%; ▌John Wolfe Jr. (Democratic) 32.8%; ▌June Griffin (Independent) 1.2%; ▌Doug Vandagriff (Independent) 0.7%; ▌Jean Howard-Hill (Independent) 0.6%
Tennessee 4	Lincoln Davis	Democratic	2002	Incumbent re-elected.	▌ ✓ Lincoln Davis (Democratic) 54.8%; ▌Janice Bowling (Republican) 43.5%; ▌Ken Martin (Independent) 1.7%
Tennessee 5	Jim Cooper	Democratic	1982; 1994 (retired); 2002	Incumbent re-elected.	▌ ✓ Jim Cooper (Democratic) 69.3%; ▌Scott Knapp (Republican) 30.7%
Tennessee 6	Bart Gordon	Democratic	1984	Incumbent re-elected.	▌ ✓ Bart Gordon (Democratic) 64.2%; ▌Nick Demas (Republican) 33.6%; ▌J. Patrick Lyons (Independent) 1.5%; ▌Norman Saliba (Independent) 0.7%
Tennessee 7	Marsha Blackburn	Republican	2002	Incumbent re-elected.	▌ ✓ Marsha Blackburn (Republican) Uncontested
Tennessee 8	John Tanner	Democratic	1988	Incumbent re-elected.	▌ ✓ John Tanner (Democratic) 74.4%; ▌James L. Hart (Republican) 25.6%
Tennessee 9	Harold Ford Jr.	Democratic	1996	Incumbent re-elected.	▌ ✓ Harold Ford Jr. (Democratic) 82.1%; ▌Ruben Fort (Republican) 17.9%

== Texas ==
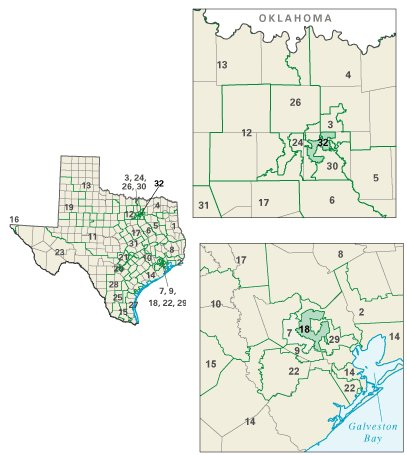
Texas districts in these elections after the 2003 Texas redistricting.

District	Incumbent	Party	First elected	Result	Candidates
Texas 1	Max Sandlin	Democratic	1996	Incumbent lost re-election. Republican gain.	▌ ✓ Louie Gohmert (Republican) 61.5%; ▌Max Sandlin (Democratic) 37.7%; ▌Dean L. Tucker (Libertarian) 0.8%
Texas 2	Nick Lampson (Redistricted from the 9th district)	Democratic	1996	Incumbent lost re-election. Republican gain.	▌ ✓ Ted Poe (Republican) 55.5%; ▌Nick Lampson (Democratic) 42.9%; ▌Sandi Saulsbury (Libertarian) 1.6%
Texas 3	Sam Johnson	Republican	1991 (special)	Incumbent re-elected.	▌ ✓ Sam Johnson (Republican) 85.6%; ▌Paul Jenkins (Independent) 8.1%; ▌James Vessels (Libertarian) 6.3%
Texas 4	Ralph Hall	Republican	1980 (Note: Hall was elected as a Democrat. He became a Republican in January 2004.)	Incumbent re-elected.	▌ ✓ Ralph Hall (Republican) 68.2%; ▌Jim Nickerson (Democratic) 30.4%; ▌Kevin D. Anderson (Libertarian) 1.3%
Texas 5	Jeb Hensarling	Republican	2002	Incumbent re-elected.	▌ ✓ Jeb Hensarling (Republican) 64.5%; ▌Bill Bernstein (Democratic) 32.9%; ▌John Gonzalez (Libertarian) 2.6%
Texas 6	Joe Barton	Republican	1984	Incumbent re-elected.	▌ ✓ Joe Barton (Republican) 66.0%; ▌Morris Meyer (Democratic) 32.7%; ▌Stephen J. Schrader (Libertarian) 1.3%
Texas 7	John Culberson	Republican	2000	Incumbent re-elected.	▌ ✓ John Culberson (Republican) 64.1%; ▌John Martinez (Democratic) 33.3%; ▌Paul Staton (Independent) 1.4%; ▌Drew P. Parks (Libertarian) 1.2%
Texas 8	Kevin Brady	Republican	1996	Incumbent re-elected.	▌ ✓ Kevin Brady (Republican) 68.9%; ▌James Wright (Democratic) 29.7%; ▌Paul Hansen (Libertarian) 1.4%
Texas 8	Jim Turner (Redistricted from the 2nd district)	Democratic	1996	Incumbent retired. Democratic loss.	▌ ✓ Kevin Brady (Republican) 68.9%; ▌James Wright (Democratic) 29.7%; ▌Paul Hansen (Libertarian) 1.4%
Texas 9	Chris Bell (Redistricted from the 25th district)	Democratic	2002	Incumbent lost renomination. Democratic hold.	▌ ✓ Al Green (Democratic) 72.2%; ▌Arlette Molina (Republican) 26.6%; ▌Stacey Lynn Bourland (Libertarian) 1.2%
Texas 10	New seat			New seat. Republican gain.	▌ ✓ Michael McCaul (Republican) 78.6%; ▌Robert William Fritsche (Libertarian) 15.4%; ▌Lorenzo Sadun (Write-in) 6.0%
Texas 11	New seat			New seat. Republican gain.	▌ ✓ Mike Conaway (Republican) 76.8%; ▌Wayne Raasch (Democratic) 21.8%; ▌Jeffrey C. Blunt (Libertarian) 1.4%
Texas 12	Kay Granger	Republican	1996	Incumbent re-elected.	▌ ✓ Kay Granger (Republican) 72.3%; ▌Felix Alvarado (Democratic) 27.7%
Texas 13	Mac Thornberry	Republican	1994	Incumbent re-elected.	▌ ✓ Mac Thornberry (Republican) 92.3%; ▌Marion Smith (Libertarian) 7.7%
Texas 14	Ron Paul	Republican	1976 (special); 1976 (defeated); 1978; 1984 (retired); 1996	Incumbent re-elected.	▌ ✓ Ron Paul (Republican) Uncontested
Texas 15	Rubén Hinojosa	Democratic	1996	Incumbent re-elected.	▌ ✓ Rubén Hinojosa (Democratic) 57.8%; ▌Michael Thamm (Republican) 40.8%; ▌William R. Cady (Libertarian) 1.4%
Texas 16	Silvestre Reyes	Democratic	1996	Incumbent re-elected.	▌ ✓ Silvestre Reyes (Democratic) 67.5%; ▌David Bringham (Republican) 31.1%; ▌Brad Clardy (Libertarian) 1.4%
Texas 17	Chet Edwards (Redistricted from the 11th district)	Democratic	1990	Incumbent re-elected.	▌ ✓ Chet Edwards (Democratic) 51.2%; ▌Arlene Wohlgemuth (Republican) 47.4%; ▌Clyde Garland (Libertarian) 1.4%
Texas 18	Sheila Jackson Lee	Democratic	1994	Incumbent re-elected.	▌ ✓ Sheila Jackson Lee (Democratic) 88.9%; ▌Thomas Bazan (Independent) 6.4%; ▌Brent Sullivan (Libertarian) 4.7%
Texas 19	Randy Neugebauer	Republican	2003	Incumbent re-elected.	▌ ✓ Randy Neugebauer (Republican) 58.4%; ▌Charles Stenholm (Democratic) 40.1%; ▌Richard Peterson (Libertarian) 1.5%
Texas 19	Charles Stenholm (Redistricted from the 17th district)	Democratic	1978	Incumbent lost re-election. Democratic loss.	▌ ✓ Randy Neugebauer (Republican) 58.4%; ▌Charles Stenholm (Democratic) 40.1%; ▌Richard Peterson (Libertarian) 1.5%
Texas 20	Charlie González	Democratic	1998	Incumbent re-elected.	▌ ✓ Charlie González (Democratic) 65.5%; ▌Roger Scott (Republican) 32.0%; ▌Jessie Bouley (Libertarian) 1.4%; ▌Michael Idrogo (Independent) 1.1%
Texas 21	Lamar Smith	Republican	1986	Incumbent re-elected.	▌ ✓ Lamar Smith (Republican) 61.5%; ▌Rhett Rosenquest Smith (Democratic) 35.5%; ▌Jason Pratt (Libertarian) 3.0%
Texas 22	Tom DeLay	Republican	1984	Incumbent re-elected.	▌ ✓ Tom DeLay (Republican) 55.2%; ▌Richard Morrison (Democratic) 41.1%; ▌Michael Fjetland (Independent) 1.9%; ▌Thomas Morrison (Libertarian) 1.8%
Texas 23	Henry Bonilla	Republican	1992	Incumbent re-elected.	▌ ✓ Henry Bonilla (Republican) 69.3%; ▌Joe Sullivan (Democratic) 29.4%; ▌Nazirite R. Flores Perez (Libertarian) 1.3%
Texas 24	New seat			New seat Republican gain.	▌ ✓ Kenny Marchant (Republican) 64.0%; ▌Gary R. Page (Democratic) 34.2%; ▌James Lawrence (Libertarian) 1.8%
Texas 25	Lloyd Doggett (Redistricted from the 10th district)	Democratic	1994	Incumbent re-elected.	▌ ✓ Lloyd Doggett (Democratic) 67.6%; ▌Rebecca Armendariz Klein (Republican) 30.7%; ▌James S. Werner (Libertarian) 1.7%
Texas 26	Michael C. Burgess	Republican	2002	Incumbent re-elected.	▌ ✓ Michael C. Burgess (Republican) 65.8%; ▌Lico Reyes (Democratic) 32.7%; ▌James Gholston (Libertarian) 1.5%
Texas 27	Solomon P. Ortiz	Democratic	1982	Incumbent re-elected.	▌ ✓ Solomon P. Ortiz (Democratic) 63.1%; ▌Willie Vaden (Republican) 34.9%; ▌Christopher J. Claytor (Libertarian) 2.0%
Texas 28	Ciro Rodriguez	Democratic	1997 (special)	Incumbent lost renomination. Democratic hold.	▌ ✓ Henry Cuellar (Democratic) 59.0%; ▌Jim Hopson (Republican) 38.6%; ▌Ken Ashby (Libertarian) 2.4%
Texas 29	Gene Green	Democratic	1992	Incumbent re-elected.	▌ ✓ Gene Green (Democratic) 94.1%; ▌Clifford Lee Messina (Libertarian) 5.9%
Texas 30	Eddie Bernice Johnson	Democratic	1992	Incumbent re-elected.	▌ ✓ Eddie Bernice Johnson (Democratic) 93.0%; ▌John E. Davis (Libertarian) 7.0%
Texas 31	John Carter	Republican	2002	Incumbent re-elected.	▌ ✓ John Carter (Republican) 64.8%; ▌Jon Porter (Democratic) 32.4%; ▌Celeste Adams (Libertarian) 2.8%
Texas 32	Pete Sessions	Republican	1996	Incumbent re-elected.	▌ ✓ Pete Sessions (Republican) 54.3%; ▌Martin Frost (Democratic) 44.0%; ▌Michael David Needleman (Libertarian) 1.7%
Texas 32	Martin Frost (Redistricted from the 24th district)	Democratic	1978	Incumbent lost re-election. Democratic loss	▌ ✓ Pete Sessions (Republican) 54.3%; ▌Martin Frost (Democratic) 44.0%; ▌Michael David Needleman (Libertarian) 1.7%

== Utah ==
Utah

District	Incumbent	Party	First elected	Result	Candidates
Utah 1	Rob Bishop	Republican	2002	Incumbent re-elected.	▌ ✓ Rob Bishop (Republican) 67.9%; ▌Steve Thompson (Democratic) 29.1%; ▌Charles Johnston (Constitution) 1.5%; ▌Richard Soderberg (Personal Choice) 1.4%
Utah 2	Jim Matheson	Democratic	2000	Incumbent re-elected.	▌ ✓ Jim Matheson (Democratic) 54.8%; ▌John Swallow (Republican) 43.2%; ▌Jeremy Petersen (Constitution) 1.0%; ▌Patrick Diehl (Green) 0.6%; ▌Ronald Amos (Personal Choice) 0.4%
Utah 3	Chris Cannon	Republican	1996	Incumbent re-elected.	▌ ✓ Chris Cannon (Republican) 63.4%; ▌Beau Babka (Democratic) 32.5%; ▌Ronald Winfield (Constitution) 1.9%; ▌Jim Dexter (Libertarian) 1.4%; ▌Curtis James (Personal Choice) 0.9%

== Vermont ==
District	Incumbent	Party	First elected	Result	Candidates
Vermont at-large	Bernie Sanders	Independent	1990	Incumbent re-elected.	▌ ✓ Bernie Sanders (Independent) 67.4%; ▌Greg Parke (Republican) 24.3%; ▌Larry Drown (Democratic) 7.1%; ▌Jane Newton (Independent) 0.9%

== Virginia ==
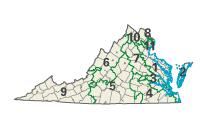
Virginia districts in these elections

District	Incumbent	Party	First elected	Result	Candidates
Virginia 1	Jo Ann Davis	Republican	2000	Incumbent re-elected.	▌ ✓ Jo Ann Davis (Republican) 78.6%; ▌William A. Lee (Independent) 20.0%
Virginia 2	Ed Schrock	Republican	2000	Incumbent retired. Republican hold.	▌ ✓ Thelma Drake (Republican) 55.1%; ▌David Ashe (Democratic) 44.8%
Virginia 3	Bobby Scott	Democratic	1992	Incumbent re-elected.	▌ ✓ Bobby Scott (Democratic) 69.3%; ▌Winsome Earle-Sears (Republican) 30.5%
Virginia 4	Randy Forbes	Republican	2001 (special)	Incumbent re-elected.	▌ ✓ Randy Forbes (Republican) 64.5%; ▌Jonathan Menefee (Democratic) 35.5%
Virginia 5	Virgil Goode	Republican	1996 (Note: Goode was elected as Democrat. He left the party in January 2000 and became a Republican in August 2002.)	Incumbent re-elected.	▌ ✓ Virgil Goode (Republican) 63.7%; ▌Al Weed (Democratic) 36.3%
Virginia 6	Bob Goodlatte	Republican	1992	Incumbent re-elected.	▌ ✓ Bob Goodlatte (Republican) Uncontested
Virginia 7	Eric Cantor	Republican	2000	Incumbent re-elected.	▌ ✓ Eric Cantor (Republican) 75.5%; ▌Brad Blanton (Independent) 24.3%
Virginia 8	Jim Moran	Democratic	1990	Incumbent re-elected.	▌ ✓ Jim Moran (Democratic) 59.7%; ▌Lisa Cheney (Republican) 36.9%; ▌Jim Hurysz (Independent) 3.2%
Virginia 9	Rick Boucher	Democratic	1982	Incumbent re-elected.	▌ ✓ Rick Boucher (Democratic) 59.3%; ▌Kevin Triplett (Republican) 38.9%; ▌Seth Davis (Independent) 1.7%
Virginia 10	Frank Wolf	Republican	1980	Incumbent re-elected.	▌ ✓ Frank Wolf (Republican) 63.7%; ▌James Socas (Democratic) 36.1%
Virginia 11	Tom Davis	Republican	1994	Incumbent re-elected.	▌ ✓ Tom Davis (Republican) 60.3%; ▌Kenneth Longmeyer (Democratic) 38.3%; ▌Joseph Oddo (Independent) 1.4%

== Washington ==
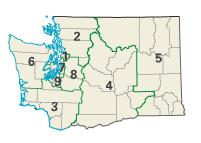
Washington districts in these elections

All seven incumbents who ran for re-election, none of whom faced viable challengers, were returned to Congress. None received less than 60% of the vote, and one received over 80%. In addition, the two seats vacated by retiring Republicans were both reclaimed by Republicans despite Democratic hopes to gain at least one seat in the vulnerable 8th district.

District	Incumbent	Party	First elected	Result	Candidates
Washington 1	Jay Inslee	Democratic	1992; 1994 (defeated); 1998	Incumbent re-elected.	▌ ✓ Jay Inslee (Democratic) 62.3%; ▌Randy Eastwood (Republican) 35.9%; ▌Charles Moore (Libertarian) 1.8%
Washington 2	Rick Larsen	Democratic	2000	Incumbent re-elected.	▌ ✓ Rick Larsen (Democratic) 63.9%; ▌Suzanne Sinclair (Republican) 33.7%; ▌Bruce Guthrie (Libertarian) 2.5%
Washington 3	Brian Baird	Democratic	1998	Incumbent re-elected.	▌ ✓ Brian Baird (Democratic) 61.9%; ▌Tom Crowson (Republican) 38.1%
Washington 4	Doc Hastings	Republican	1994	Incumbent re-elected.	▌ ✓ Doc Hastings (Republican) 62.6%; ▌Sandy Matheson (Democratic) 37.4%
Washington 5	George Nethercutt	Republican	1994	Incumbent retired to run for U.S. Senator. Republican hold.	▌ ✓ Cathy McMorris (Republican) 59.7%; ▌Don Barbieri (Democratic) 40.3%
Washington 6	Norm Dicks	Democratic	1976	Incumbent re-elected.	▌ ✓ Norm Dicks (Democratic) 69.0%; ▌Doug Cloud (Republican) 31.0%
Washington 7	Jim McDermott	Democratic	1988	Incumbent re-elected.	▌ ✓ Jim McDermott (Democratic) 80.7%; ▌Carol Cassady (Republican) 19.3%
Washington 8	Jennifer Dunn	Republican	1992	Incumbent retired. Republican hold.	▌ ✓ Dave Reichert (Republican) 51.5%; ▌Dave Ross (Democratic) 46.7%; ▌Spencer Garrett (Libertarian) 1.8%
Washington 9	Adam Smith	Democratic	1996	Incumbent re-elected.	▌ ✓ Adam Smith (Democratic) 63.3%; ▌Paul J. Lord (Republican) 34.4%; ▌Robert Losey (Green) 2.3%

== West Virginia ==
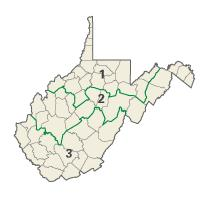
West Virginia districts in these elections

District	Incumbent	Party	First elected	Result	Candidates
West Virginia 1	Alan Mollohan	Democratic	1982	Incumbent re-elected.	▌ ✓ Alan Mollohan (Democratic) 67.8%; ▌Alan Lee Parks (Republican) 32.2%
West Virginia 2	Shelley Moore Capito	Republican	2000	Incumbent re-elected.	▌ ✓ Shelley Moore Capito (Republican) 57.5%; ▌Erik Wells (Democratic) 41.3%; ▌Julian Martin (Independent) 1.2%
West Virginia 3	Nick Rahall	Democratic	1976	Incumbent re-elected.	▌ ✓ Nick Rahall (Democratic) 65.2%; ▌Rick Snuffer (Republican) 34.8%

== Wisconsin ==
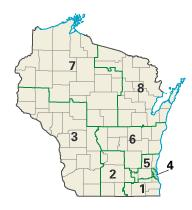
Wisconsin districts in these elections

District	Incumbent	Party	First elected	Result	Candidates
Wisconsin 1	Paul Ryan	Republican	1998	Incumbent re-elected.	▌ ✓ Paul Ryan (Republican) 65.4%; ▌Jeffrey C. Thomas (Democratic) 32.6%; ▌Norman Aulabaugh (Independent) 1.2%; ▌Don Bernau (Libertarian) 0.8%
Wisconsin 2	Tammy Baldwin	Democratic	1998	Incumbent re-elected.	▌ ✓ Tammy Baldwin (Democratic) 63.3%; ▌Dave Magnum (Republican) 36.7%
Wisconsin 3	Ron Kind	Democratic	1996	Incumbent re-elected.	▌ ✓ Ron Kind (Democratic) 56.4%; ▌Dale Schultz (Republican) 43.6%
Wisconsin 4	Jerry Kleczka	Democratic	1984	Incumbent retired. Democratic hold.	▌ ✓ Gwen Moore (Democratic) 69.6%; ▌Gerald H. Boyle (Republican) 28.2%; ▌Tim Johnson (Independent) 1.2%; ▌Robert R. Raymond (Independent) 0.6%; ▌Collin Hudson (Constitution) 0.3%
Wisconsin 5	Jim Sensenbrenner	Republican	1978	Incumbent re-elected.	▌ ✓ Jim Sensenbrenner (Republican) 66.6%; ▌Bryan Kennedy (Democratic) 31.8%; ▌Tim Peterson (Libertarian) 1.6%
Wisconsin 6	Tom Petri	Republican	1979 (special)	Incumbent re-elected.	▌ ✓ Tom Petri (Republican) 67.0%; ▌Jef Hall (Democratic) 30.1%; ▌Carol Ann Rittenhouse (Green) 2.9%
Wisconsin 7	Dave Obey	Democratic	1969 (special)	Incumbent re-elected.	▌ ✓ Dave Obey (Democratic) 85.6%; ▌Mike Miles (Green) 9.4%; ▌Larry Oftedahl (Independent) 5.0%
Wisconsin 8	Mark Green	Republican	1998	Incumbent re-elected.	▌ ✓ Mark Green (Republican) 70.1%; ▌Dottie LeClair (Democratic) 29.9%

== Wyoming ==
District	Incumbent	Party	First elected	Result	Candidates
Wyoming at-large	Barbara Cubin	Republican	1994	Incumbent re-elected.	▌ ✓ Barbara Cubin (Republican) 55.3%; ▌Ted Ladd (Democratic) 41.9%; ▌Lewis Stock (Libertarian) 2.8%

== Non-voting delegates ==
District	Incumbent	Party	Elected	Status	Result
American Samoa at-large	Eni Faleomavaega	Democratic	1988	Incumbent re-elected.	▌ ✓ Eni Faleomavaega (Democratic) 54.9%; ▌Amata Coleman Radewagen (Republican) 45.1%
District of Columbia at-large	Eleanor Holmes Norton	Democratic	1990	Incumbent re-elected.	▌ ✓ Eleanor Holmes Norton (Democratic) 91.3%; ▌Michael Monroe (Republican) 8.3%
Guam at-large	Madeleine Bordallo	Democratic	2002	Incumbent re-elected.	▌ ✓ Madeleine Bordallo (Democratic) 97.4%
Puerto Rico at-large	Aníbal Acevedo Vilá	Popular Democratic/ Democratic	1992	Incumbent retired to run for Governor of Puerto Rico. New Progressive gain. Republican gain.	▌ ✓ Luis Fortuño (PNP/Republican) 48.8%; ▌Roberto Prats (PPD/Democratic) 48.3%; ▌Edwin Irizarry Mora (PIP) 2.9%
U.S. Virgin Islands at-large	Donna Christensen	Democratic	1996	Incumbent re-elected.	▌ ✓ Donna Christensen (Democratic) 65.8%; ▌Warren Mosler (Independent) 28.5%; ▌Krim Ballantine 5.7%

== See also ==
- 2004 United States elections
  - 2004 United States gubernatorial elections
  - 2004 United States presidential election
  - 2004 United States Senate elections
- 108th United States Congress
- 109th United States Congress
