= 2000 United States House of Representatives elections in Idaho =

- November 7, 2000

All 2 Idaho seats to the United States House of Representatives
	Majority party	Minority party
Party	Republican	Democratic
Last election	2	0
Seats won	2	0
Seat change	Steady	Steady
Popular vote	332,655	142,345
Percentage	67.50%	28.88%

The 2000 United States House of Representatives elections in Idaho were held on November 7, 2000, to elect the state of Idaho's two members to the United States House of Representatives.

== Overview ==
2000 United States House of Representatives elections in Idaho
Party	Votes	Percentage	Seats	+/–
Republican	332,655	67.50%	2	—
Democratic	142,345	28.88%	0	—
Libertarian	13,635	2.77%	0	—
Reform	4,200	0.85%	0	—
Totals	492,835	100.00%	2	—

== District 1 ==
2000 Idaho's 1st congressional district election
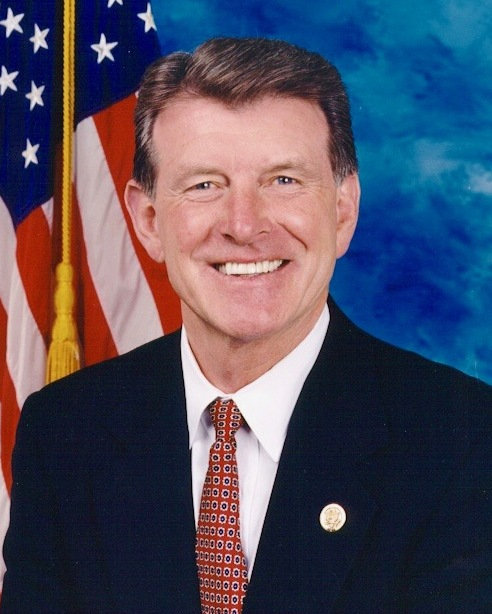

Nominee	Butch Otter	Linda Pall
Party	Republican	Democratic
Popular vote	173,743	84,080
Percentage	64.8%	31.4%
- County results Otter: 50–60% 60–70% 70–80%
U.S. Representative before election
Helen Chenoweth
Republican
Elected U.S. Representative
Butch Otter
Republican

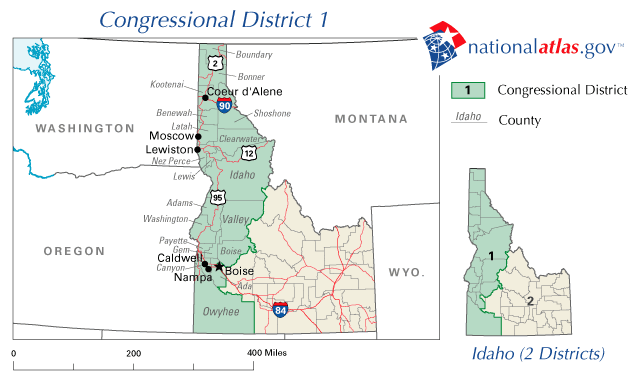

Incumbent Republican Congresswoman Helen Chenoweth, who declined to seek re-election to a fourth term, sticking to her commitment to only serve three terms in Congress, despite pressure from the Republican Party to run. Lieutenant Governor Butch Otter won the Republican primary to succeed her, and faced Moscow City Councilwoman Linda Pall in the general election. Otter defeated Pall in a landslide, winning his first term with 65 percent of the vote.

=== Republican primary ===
==== Candidates ====
- Butch Otter, Lieutenant Governor of Idaho
- Dennis Mansfield, conservative activist
- Ron McMurray, former Chairman of the Idaho Republican Party
- Craig Benjamin, Washington State University employee, engineer, minister
- Jim Pratt, businessman
- David Shepherd
- Gene Summa, forklift operator
- Harley D. Brown, engineer

==== Results ====
Republican primary results
Party	Candidate	Votes	%
Republican	Butch Otter	41,516	47.63%
Republican	Dennis Mansfield	23,559	27.03%
Republican	Ron McMurray	14,434	16.56%
Republican	Craig Benjamin	2,966	3.40%
Republican	Jim Pratt	1,281	1.47%
Republican	Gene Summa	1,240	1.42%
Republican	David Shepherd	1,181	1.35%
Republican	Harley Brown	983	1.13%
Total votes		87,160	100.00%

=== Democratic primary ===
==== Candidates ====
- Linda Pall, Moscow City Councilwoman

==== Results ====
Democratic primary results
Party	Candidate	Votes	%
Democratic	Linda Pall	16,657	100.00%
Total votes		16,657	100.00%

=== Candidates ===
- Butch Otter (Republican)
- Linda Pall (Democratic)
- Kevin Philip Hambsch (Reform)
- Ronald G. Wittig (Libertarian)

=== Results ===
2000 Idaho's 1st congressional district general election results
Party	Candidate	Votes	%
Republican	Butch Otter	173,743	64.80%
Democratic	Linda Pall	84,080	31.36%
Libertarian	Ronald G. Wittig	6,093	2.27%
Democratic	Kevin Philip Hambsch	4,200	1.57%
Total votes		268,116	100.00%
Republican hold			

== District 2 ==
2000 Idaho's 2nd congressional district election
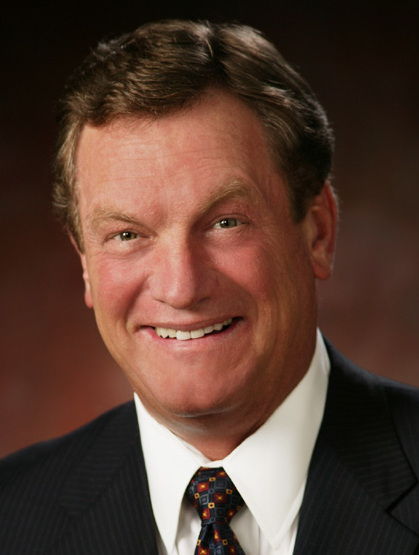

Nominee	Mike Simpson	Craig Williams
Party	Republican	Democratic
Popular vote	158,912	58,265
Percentage	70.7%	25.9%
- County results Simpson: 50–60% 60–70% 70–80% 80–90%
U.S. Representative before election
Mike Simpson
Republican
Elected U.S. Representative
Mike Simpson
Republican

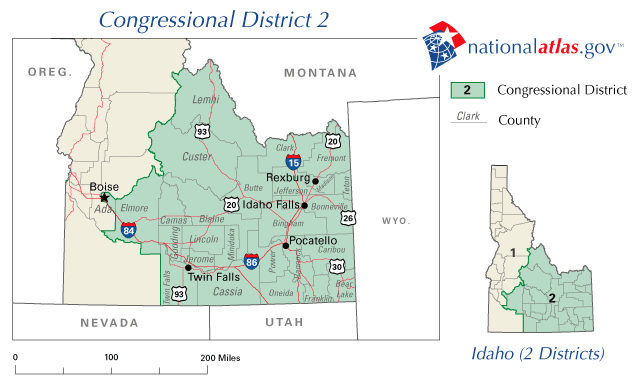

Incumbent Republican Congressman Mike Simpson ran for re-election to a second term. He was unopposed in the Republican primary and faced former flight instructor Craig Williams, the Democratic nominee, in the general election. Simpson defeated Williams by a wide margin, receiving 71 percent of the vote to Williams's 26 percent.

=== Republican primary ===
==== Candidates ====
- Mike Simpson, incumbent U.S. Representative

==== Results ====
Republican primary results
Party	Candidate	Votes	%
Republican	Mike Simpson (inc.)	60,984	100.00%
Total votes		60,984	100.00%

=== Democratic primary ===
==== Candidates ====
- Craig Williams, former United States Air Force flight instructor
- Jack Wayne Chappell, writer, 1998 Democratic candidate for Governor

==== Results ====
Democratic primary results
Party	Candidate	Votes	%
Democratic	Craig Williams	10,771	77.27%
Democratic	Jack Wayne Chappell	3,169	22.73%
Total votes		13,940	100.00%

=== General election ===
==== Candidates ====
- Mike Simpson (Republican)
- Craig Williams (Democratic)
- Donovan Bramwell (Libertarian)

==== Results ====
2000 Idaho's 2nd congressional district general election results
Party	Candidate	Votes	%
Republican	Mike Simpson (inc.)	158,912	70.72%
Democratic	Craig Williams	58,265	25.93%
Libertarian	Donovan Bramwell	7,542	3.36%
Total votes		224,719	100.00%
Republican hold			

== See also ==
- 2000 United States House of Representatives elections
