= Ben Konop =

American politician

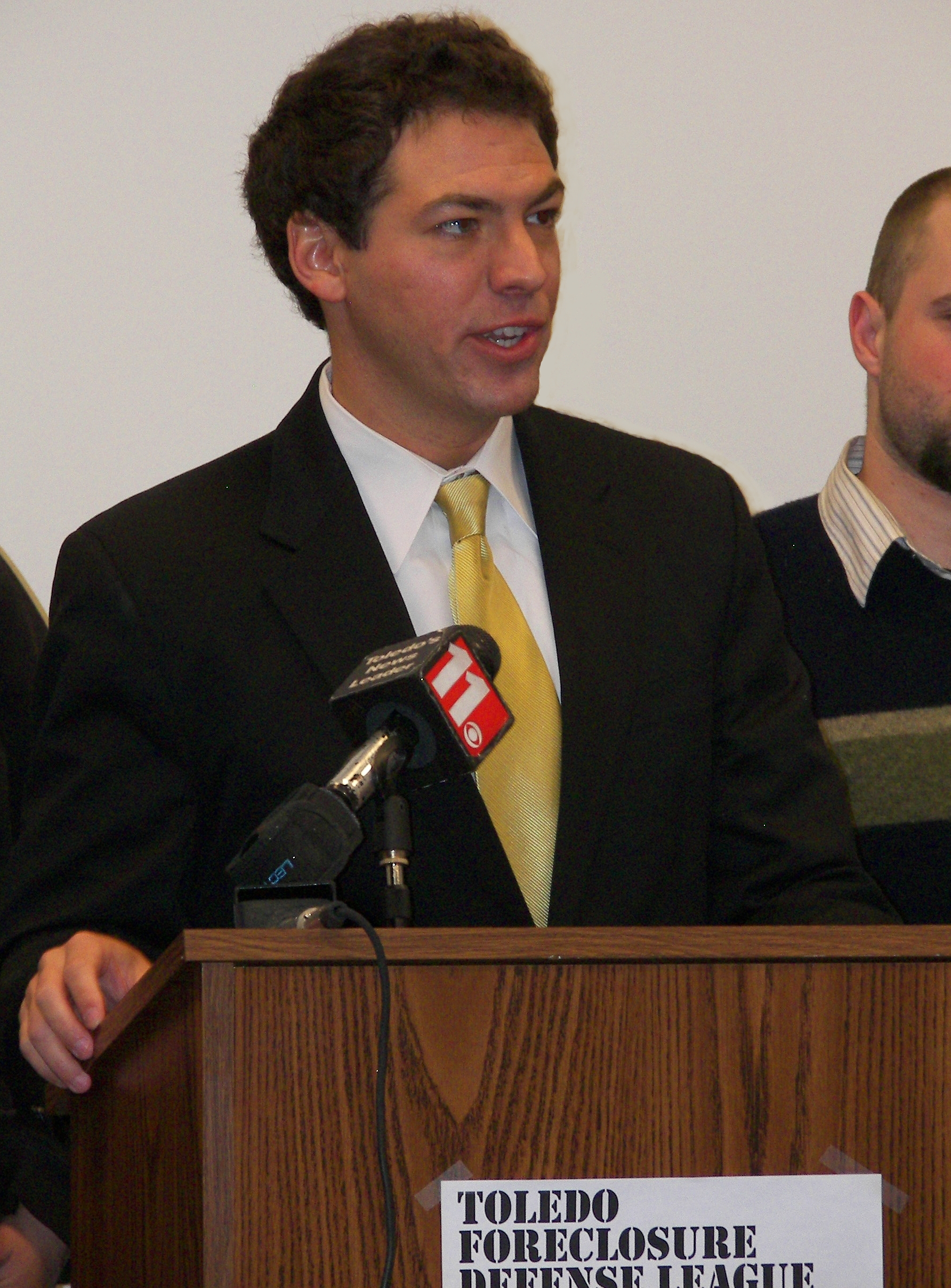

Lucas County Commissioner, Ohio
- In office 2007–2011
- Preceded by: Maggie Thurber

Personal details
- Born: Benjamin Zachary Konop; March 1, 1976 (age 50) Sylvania, Ohio, U.S.
- Party: Democratic
- Education: University of Michigan (J.D.), Emory University (B.A.)

Benjamin Zachary Konop (born March 1, 1976) is a senior litigation counsel in the Office of Enforcement at the Consumer Financial Protection Bureau in Washington, D.C. He also was a law professor and attorney in private practice.

In 2006, Konop was elected to a four-year term as Lucas County (Ohio) Commissioner.

He ran unsuccessfully for mayor of Toledo, Ohio in 2009. During the campaign a heckler booed him and called him a liar for going back on his pledge to remain in his county commissioner seat until his full term was up. A video of the booing incident went viral on YouTube and was spoofed on Comedy Central's South Park.

Sports radio host Steve Czaban annually airs audio of the booing incident the day after Major League Baseball’s All-Star Game. Czaban calls this day “low tide,” as there are no games of note being played.

Konop also ran unsuccessfully as the Democratic Party candidate in Ohio's 4th congressional district for the United States House of Representatives in 2004.

== Early life and education ==
Konop received a Bachelor of Arts degree in history from Emory University, where he worked in the Washington, D.C., office of Congresswoman Marcy Kaptur. He earned a Juris Doctor degree from the University of Michigan in 2000 and subsequently practiced law at Fulbright & Jaworski.

== Career ==
=== Unsuccessful campaigns ===
In 2004, Democrat Ben Konop lost to Republican incumbent Mike Oxley in Ohio’s 4th congressional district. Konop received 41.4% of the vote.

After the campaign, Konop taught law at Ohio Northern University and the University of Toledo, and political science at Bluffton University.

In 2009, while serving as Lucas County Commissioner, Konop ran for mayor of Toledo, drawing criticism for breaking his 2006 pledge to serve a full term; he argued the city faced urgent challenges requiring new leadership. In the September 15, 2009, primary election, Konop received 3,503 votes, or 9.47% of the total. He finished behind Keith Wilkowski (30.78%), Mike Bell (29.13%), James Moody (15.35%), and D. Michael Collins (14.59%). Konop placed ahead of Opal Covey, a perennial candidate known for multiple unsuccessful campaigns.

Konop’s 2009 mayoral campaign drew negative attention after a widely viewed video showed him being heckled during a news conference; the incident and a follow-up parody video hurt his campaign, and he finished fifth out of six candidates. According to the heckler, a member of Konop’s campaign staff damaged his flowerbed prior to a press conference and did not offer an apology. Austin claimed that this incident prompted his repeated heckling during the event.

=== Lucas County Commissioner ===
In 2006, Konop was elected Lucas County Commissioner, defeating city council member George Sarantou by over 40,000 votes.

As Lucas County Commissioner, Konop implemented a dog microchipping program and led animal welfare reforms that reduced euthanasia rates and prompted changes at the county dog pound.

As commissioner, Konop ended no-bid contracts over $5,000, supported transparency in campaign donations, backed an anti-nepotism policy, and helped preserve the Children’s Wonderland exhibit.

In 2009, Konop proposed a $70 million publicly funded college scholarship program, but the plan was rejected by fellow commissioners, which he later called his greatest disappointment in office.

News coverage described Konop as controversial due to his confrontational approach toward fellow commissioners and organizations such as the Lucas County Improvement Corporation (LCIC). He was often portrayed as difficult to work with and was frequently the sole dissenting vote on county issues.

=== Media ===
Following his term as Commissioner, Konop was employed as a columnist for the Toledo Blade.

=== Consumer Financial Protection Bureau (CFPB) ===
Since 2011, Konop has worked at the CFPB and currently serves as senior litigation counsel in the Office of Enforcement.

Konop served as lead counsel in CFPB v. Gamber, a case involving illegal agreements to buy veterans’ benefits. The settlement included up to $2.7 million in penalties. In a related case, over $9 million was awarded to affected veterans.

Konop also represented the Bureau in a federal court contempt proceeding against mortgage broker Gary Klopp which resulted in a $525,000 disgorgement order by the court related to violations of a settlement agreement in a mortgage kickback scheme.

In 2012, Konop helped establish a chapter of the National Treasury Employees Union at the CFPB. He was elected executive vice president in 2013 and served on the committee that negotiated the agency’s first collective bargaining agreement. In 2014, he helped lead efforts addressing bias at the CFPB, resulting in changes to the performance review system and $5.5 million in back pay for employees.

In 2014, Konop testified before Congress about discrimination at the CFPB, citing concerns over pay equity and performance reviews affecting minorities, women, and older employees. His testimony highlighted disparities in performance ratings that led to grievances, bargaining, and acknowledgment of systemic issues within the agency.

== Criticisms and controversies ==
=== Flag desecration ===
In August 2009, Konop appeared in a spoof video referencing the heckling incident. The video depicted him in a mock fight with a heckler, during which the individual fell onto an American flag, causing it to touch the ground.

The video drew criticism for the treatment of the American flag, prompting Konop to issue multiple public apologies. He also requested its removal from YouTube. The incident generated additional negative media attention during his mayoral campaign and was viewed by some observers as a misstep during a pivotal time.

=== Improper spending ===
In March 2009, reports of improper spending emerged at Connecting Point, a Toledo agency where Konop served on the board of trustees. Konop claimed that his fellow commissioners used the issue to target him politically. In response, they accused him of making personal rather than substantive criticisms. The incident raised questions about oversight during his tenure on the board.

=== Interpersonal conflicts ===
Konop was frequently unable to build consensus with his fellow commissioners. His communication style drew criticism, with one commissioner remarking that “communication has always been his fatal flaw.” He often cast lone dissenting votes against county spending measures, travel expenses, and other routine government actions, but had limited success in influencing policy outcomes.
