= 1998 United States House of Representatives elections in Indiana =

- November 3, 1998

All 10 Indiana seats to the United States House of Representatives
| | Majority party | Minority party |
|---|---|---|
| Party | Republican | Democratic |
| Last election | 6 | 4 |
| Seats won | 6 | 4 |
| Seat change | Steady | Steady |
| Popular vote | 861,951 | 673,322 |
| Percentage | 54.70% | 42.73% |
| Swing | ▲1.86% | ▼1.61% |

Republican
40–50%
50–60%
60–70%
70–80%
Democratic
40–50%
50–60%
60–70%
70–80%

The 1998 congressional elections in Indiana were elections for Indiana's delegation to the United States House of Representatives, which occurred along with congressional elections nationwide on November 3, 1998. Republicans held a majority of Indiana's delegation over the Democrats, 6–4. Representatives were elected using the U.S. congressional districts based on the 1990 U.S. census.

== Results ==
The following are the final results from the Secretary of State of Indiana.

=== Statewide ===
United States House of Representatives elections in Indiana, 1998
| Party | Votes | Percentage | Seats | +/– |
|---|---|---|---|---|
| Republican | 861,951 | 54.70% | 6 | - |
| Democratic | 673,322 | 42.73% | 4 | - |
| Libertarian | 40,507 | 2.57% | 0 | - |
| Others | 91 | <0.01% | 0 | - |
| Totals | 1,575,871 | 100.00% | 10 | - |

Popular vote
| Republican | 54.70% |
| Democratic | 42.73% |
| Libertarian | 2.57% |
| Other | 0.01% |

House seats
| Republican | 60.00% |
| Democratic | 40.00% |

== District 9 ==
=== General election ===
==== Polling ====
| Poll source | Date(s) | Sample size | Margin of error | Jean Leising (R) | Baron Hill (D) | Other / undecided (Note: Calculated by taking the difference of 100% and all other candidates combined.) |
|---|---|---|---|---|---|---|
| Public Opinion Strategies (R) (Note: Poll conducted for an unspecified Republican sponsor.) | October 21, 1998 | 300 | — | 51% | 41% | 8% |

== District 10 ==
=== General election ===
==== Polling ====
| Poll source | Date(s) | Sample size | Margin of error | Julia Carson (D) | Gary Hofmeister (R) | Other / undecided (Note: Calculated by taking the difference of 100% and all other candidates combined.) |
|---|---|---|---|---|---|---|
| Massie & Associates (R) (Note: Poll conducted for an unspecified Republican sponsor.) | October 24, 1998 | 300 | — | 38% | 47% | 15% |
| Massie & Associates (R) | October 17, 1998 | 300 | — | 37% | 38% | 25% |

== See also ==
- 1998 United States House of Representatives elections

== Notes ==
| Preceded by 1996 elections | United States House elections in Indiana; 1998 | Succeeded by 2000 elections |
