= 2001 United States House of Representatives elections =

- May 15, 2001 – December 18, 2001

7 of the 435 seats in the United States House of Representatives 218 seats needed for a majority
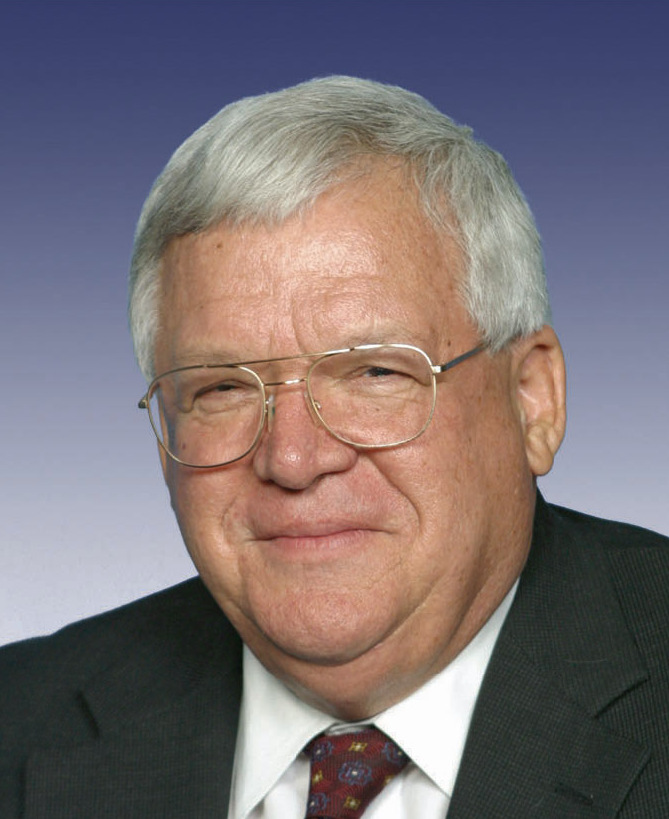

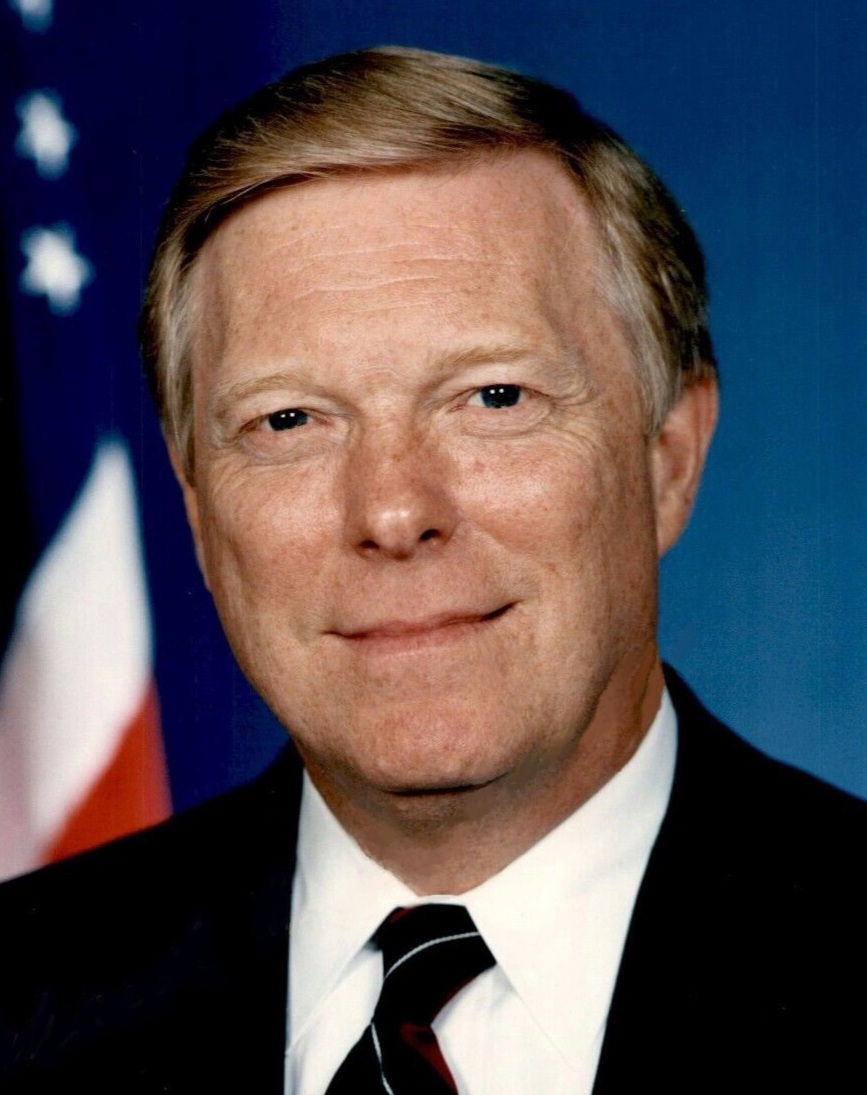
	Majority party	Minority party
Leader	Dennis Hastert	Dick Gephardt
Party	Republican	Democratic
Leader since	January 3, 1999	January 3, 1995
Leader's seat	Illinois's 14th	Missouri's 3rd
Last election	221 seats, 47.6%	211 seats, 47.3%
Seats won	5	3
Seat change	▲1	▼1
	Third party
Party	Independent
Last election	2 seats, 0.7%
Seats won	0
Seat change	Steady
Speaker before election
Dennis Hastert
Republican
Elected Speaker
Dennis Hastert
Republican

In 2001 there were seven special elections to the United States House of Representatives in the 107th United States Congress.

== Summary ==
Elections are listed by date and district.

District	Incumbent			This race	
District	Member	Party	First elected	Results	Candidates
Pennsylvania 9	Bud Shuster	Republican	1972	Incumbent resigned, effective January 31, 2001. New member elected May 15, 2001. Republican hold.	▌ ✓ Bill Shuster (Republican) 51.91%; ▌Scott Conklin (Democratic) 43.96%; ▌Alanna Hartzok (Green) 4.13%
California 32	Julian Dixon	Democratic	1978	Incumbent won reelection, but died December 8, 2000 before the end of the previous Congress. New member elected June 5, 2001. Democratic hold.	▌ ✓ Diane Watson (Democratic) 74.81%; ▌Noel Hentschel (Republican) 19.89%; ▌Donna J. Warren (Green) 3.75%; ▌Ezola Foster (Reform) 1.55%
Virginia 4	Norman Sisisky	Democratic	1982	Incumbent died March 29, 2001. New member elected June 19, 2001. Republican gain.	▌ ✓ Randy Forbes (Republican) 52.02%; ▌Louise Lucas (Democratic) 47.82%
Florida 1	Joe Scarborough	Republican	1994	Incumbent resigned, effective September 6, 2001. New member elected October 16, 2001. Republican hold.	▌ ✓ Jeff Miller (Republican) 65.68%; ▌Steve Briese (Democratic) 27.99%; ▌John G. Ralls Jr. (Independent) 6.31%
Massachusetts 9	Joe Moakley	Democratic	1972	Incumbent died May 28, 2001. New member elected October 16, 2001. Democratic hold.	▌ ✓ Stephen Lynch (Democratic) 64.97%; ▌Jo Ann Sprague (Republican) 32.73%; ▌Susan Gallagher-Long (Conservative) 1.20%; ▌Brock Satter (Socialist Workers) 0.74%
Arkansas 3	Asa Hutchinson	Republican	1996	Incumbent resigned August 5, 2001 to head the Drug Enforcement Administration. New member elected November 20, 2001. Republican hold.	▌ ✓ John Boozman (Republican) 55.55%; ▌Mike Hathorn (Democratic) 42.15%; ▌Sarah Marsh (Green) 1.86%; ▌Ralph Forbes (Freedom) 0.44%
South Carolina 2	Floyd Spence	Republican	1970	Incumbent died August 16, 2001. New member elected December 18, 2001. Republican hold.	▌ ✓ Joe Wilson (Republican) 73.09%; ▌Brent Weaver (Democratic) 25.42%; ▌Warren Eilertson (Libertarian) 0.76%; ▌Steve LeFemine (Constitution) 0.73%

== See also ==
- List of special elections to the United States House of Representatives
