= 2001 California's 32nd congressional district special election =

- June 5, 2001

California's 32nd congressional district
- Turnout: 15.27%
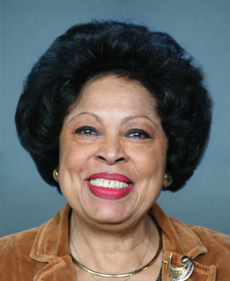

Nominee	Diane Watson	Noel Irwin Hentschel
Party	Democratic	Republican
Popular vote	75,584	20,088
Percentage	74.82%	19.88%
U.S. Representative before election
Julian Dixon
Democratic
Elected U.S. Representative
Diane Watson
Democratic

A special general election was held on June 5, 2001, to elect a member of the United States House of Representatives from California's 32nd congressional district to replace Julian Dixon, who died on December 8, 2000, of a heart attack.

A special blanket primary was held on April 10, 2001, of which Democratic Ambassador Diane Watson won nearly a third of the vote in a field of sixteen candidates. She handily defeated her main challenger, Republican Noel Irwin Hentschel, in the special general election. Watson was redistricted to the 33rd district for the 2002 election, in which she was elected to a full term.

== Background ==
Located mainly in the Culver City area of Los Angeles County, the 32nd district was considered a Democratic stronghold. It voted strongly Democratic in the past few presidential elections, giving Al Gore a lead of 70 percentage points over George W. Bush in the 2000 election.

Julian Dixon was first elected in 1978 to represent the 28th district. He never faced serious competition during his tenure, and would serve eleven terms. Before starting his twelfth term, to which he was elected with 83.5% of the vote, he died in Los Angeles of a heart attack.

== Candidates ==
=== Democratic Party ===
- Kirsten W. Albrecht
- Jules Bagneris, candidate for Los Angeles City Council in 1989
- Tad Daley, author and anti-war activist
- Frank Evans III
- Nate Holden, Los Angeles City Council member (1987–2002) and state senator (1974–1978)
- Wanda James
- Philip A. Lowe
- Kevin Murray, state senator (1999–2005) and state assemblyman (1994–1998)
- Blair H. Taylor
- Leo Terrell, civil rights attorney and political commentator
- Diane Watson, U.S. Ambassador to Micronesia (1999–2000) and state senator (1978–1990, 1994–1998)

=== Republican Party ===
- Mike Cyrus
- Noel Irwin Hentschel, philanthropist and candidate for lieutenant governor in 1998
- Mike Schaefer, San Diego City Council member (1965–1971) and financial analyst

=== Green Party ===
- Donna J. Warren, human rights activist

=== Reform Party ===
- Ezola Foster, educator and candidate for U.S. vice president in 2000

== Endorsements ==
Tad Daley (D)
- John B. Anderson, U.S. Representative for IL-16 (1961–1981) and independent candidate for U.S. president in 1980
- Martin Sheen, actor
Noel Irwin Hentschel (R)
- Burt Bacharach, composer and songwriter

== Results ==
=== Primary ===
Special election, April 10, 2001
Party	Candidate	Votes	%
Democratic	Diane Watson	29,524	32.87
Democratic	Kevin Murray	23,697	26.38
Democratic	Nate Holden	15,005	16.70
Republican	Noel Irwin Hentschel	4,806	5.35
Democratic	Leo Terrell	4,387	4.88
Democratic	Philip A. Lowe	2,742	3.05
Republican	Mike Schaefer	2,315	2.58
Democratic	Tad Daley	1,407	1.57
Green	Donna J. Warren	1,167	1.30
Democratic	Jules Bagneris	1,145	1.28
Republican	Mike Cyrus	982	1.09
Democratic	Kirsten W. Albrecht	768	0.86
Democratic	Wanda James	572	0.64
Democratic	Blair H. Taylor	558	0.62
Reform	Ezola Foster	514	0.57
Democratic	Frank Evans III	244	0.27
Total votes		89,833	100.00
Turnout			3.51

=== General ===
Special election, June 5, 2001
Party	Candidate	Votes	%
Democratic	Diane Watson	75,584	74.82
Republican	Noel Irwin Hentschel	20,088	19.88
Green	Donna J. Warren	3,792	3.75
Reform	Ezola Foster	1,557	1.54
Majority		54,496	54.94
Total votes		101,021	100.00
Turnout			15.27
Democratic hold			

== See also ==
- List of special elections to the United States House of Representatives
