= Gwen Moore (California politician) =

American politician (1940–2020)

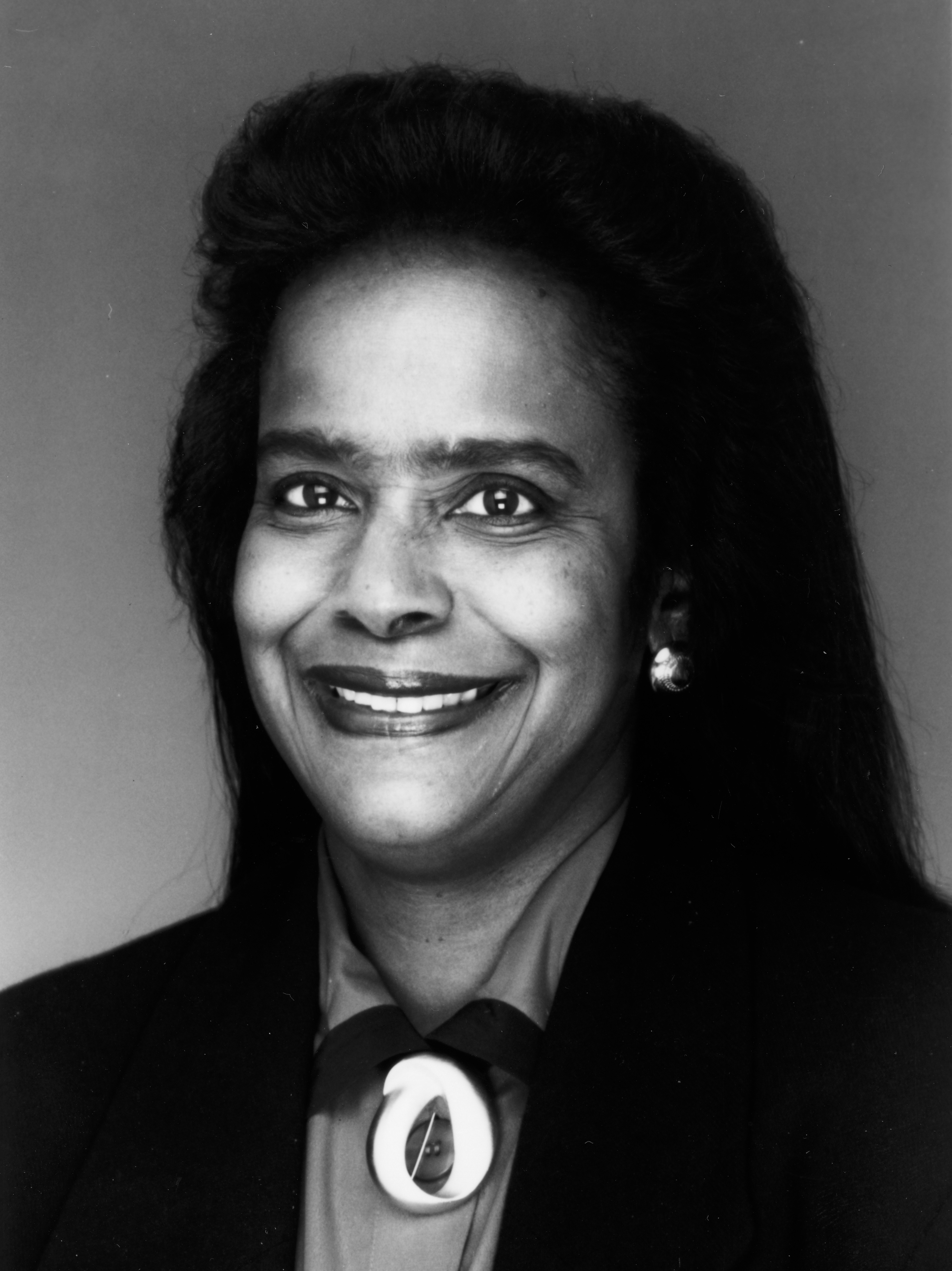
- Official portrait, 1979

Member of the California State Assembly
- In office December 4, 1978 – November 30, 1994
- Preceded by: Julian Dixon
- Succeeded by: Kevin Murray
- Constituency: 49th district (1978–1992); 47th district (1992–1994)

Personal details
- Born: Gwendolyn Ann Moore; October 28, 1940 Los Angeles, California, U.S.
- Died: August 19, 2020 (aged 79) Los Angeles, California, U.S.
- Party: Democratic
- Spouse: Ronald Dobson
- Children: 1
- Education: University of California, Los Angeles (BA, GrCert)

Gwendolyn Ann Moore (October 28, 1940 – August 19, 2020) was an American politician who served as a member of the California State Assembly for the 49th district from 1978 to 1992 and the 47th district 1992 to 1994.

== Early life and education ==
Moore was born in Los Angeles, California. She earned a bachelor's degree and teaching credential from the University of California, Los Angeles.

== Career ==
In 1975, she was elected to the Los Angeles Community College District Board. She was elected to the California State Assembly in 1978 and served until 1994. During her tenure, Moore supported legislation related to supplier diversity and public access to restrooms in supermarkets larger than 20,000 square feet. She represented the 49th District; after the 1990 redistricting, the 49th was renumbered as the 47th district. With term limits impending, Moore decided to leave the Assembly with one term left and ran for Secretary of State of California in 1994. She lost the primary to Interim Secretary of State Tony Miller, who had succeeded to the office upon the resignation of March Fong Eu earlier in 1994.

Gwen Moore Lake in Kenneth Hahn State Recreation Area in the Baldwin Hills area of Los Angeles memorializes her public service.

== Death ==
Moore died on August 19, 2020, at the age of 79.

California Assembly
Preceded by Julian Dixon	California State Assemblywoman, 49th District; 1978–1992	Succeeded by Diane Martinez
Preceded by Teresa Hughes	California State Assemblywoman, 47th District; 1992–1994	Succeeded by Kevin Murray
