= United States House Oversight and Government Reform Subcommittee on Domestic Policy =

The Subcommittee on Domestic Policy was a standing committee within the United States House Committee on Oversight and Government Reform. Jurisdiction included domestic policies, including matters relating to energy, labor, education, criminal justice, the economy, as well as the Office of National Drug Control Policy.

== Members, 111th Congress ==
Majority	Minority
Dennis Kucinich, Ohio, Chairman; Elijah Cummings, Maryland; Diane Watson, California; John F. Tierney, Massachusetts; Jim Cooper, Tennessee; Patrick J. Kennedy, Rhode Island; Peter Welch, Vermont; Bill Foster, Illinois; Marcy Kaptur, Ohio	Jim Jordan, Ohio, Ranking Member; Dan Burton, Indiana; Mike Turner, Ohio; Jeff Fortenberry, Nebraska; Aaron Schock, Illinois; Bill Shuster, Pennsylvania
Ex officio
Edolphus Towns, New York	Darrell Issa, California
