= California's 32nd congressional district =

U.S. House district for California

Coordinates: 34°05′22″N 117°54′50″W

- Interactive map of district boundaries
- Representative: Brad Sherman; D–Los Angeles
- Population (2025): 739,495
- Median household income: $107,943
- Ethnicity: 52.5% White; 25.5% Hispanic; 12.4% Asian; 4.6% Two or more races; 4.1% Black; 1.0% other
- Cook PVI: D+17

California's 32nd congressional district is a congressional district in the U.S. state of California based in Los Angeles County. The 32nd district takes in the city of Malibu and the Los Angeles neighborhoods of Pacific Palisades, Beverly Glen, Bel Air, Studio City, Sherman Oaks, Woodland Hills, West Hills, Canoga Park, Winnetka, Reseda, Tarzana, Encino, Chatsworth, Northridge, Brentwood, North Hills, as well as the south side of Granada Hills.

The district is currently represented by Democrat Brad Sherman.

The district was previously represented by Democrat Judy Chu. Following the 2012 elections, due to redistricting, Chu ran for U.S. Representative in the 27th congressional district, while Grace Napolitano ran in the 32nd congressional district, having been displaced from the 38th district. Sherman, the district's current representative, previously sat in the House for California's 30th congressional district.

== Recent election results from statewide races ==
=== 2023–2027 boundaries ===
Year	Office	Results
2008	President	Obama 68% - 32%
2010	Governor	Brown 59% - 38%
2010	Lt. Governor	Newsom 59% - 32%
2010	Secretary of State	Bowen 59% - 33%
2010	Attorney General	Harris 48% - 45%
2010	Treasurer	Lockyer 63% - 32%
2010	Controller	Chiang 59% - 33%
2012	President	Obama 67% - 33%
2014	Governor	Brown 65% - 35%
2016	President	Clinton 70% - 25%
2018	Governor	Newsom 70% - 30%
2018	Attorney General	Becerra 72% - 28%
2020	President	Biden 69% - 29%
2022	Senate (Reg.)	Padilla 69% - 31%
2022	Governor	Newsom 66% - 34%
2022	Lt. Governor	Kounalakis 67% - 33%
2022	Secretary of State	Weber 67% - 33%
2022	Attorney General	Bonta 65% - 35%
2022	Treasurer	Ma 65% - 35%
2022	Controller	Cohen 58% - 42%
2024	President	Harris 64% - 33%
2024	Senate (Reg.)	Schiff 65% - 35%

== Composition ==
FIPS County Code	County	Seat	Population
37	Los Angeles	Los Angeles	9,663,345

Under the 2020 redistricting, California's 32nd congressional district is located in Southern California. Half of the district covers the westernmost border of Los Angeles County, while the other half extends to the western areas of the City of Los Angeles.

Los Angeles County is split between this district and the 27th, 29th, 30th and 36th districts. The 32nd and 27th are partitioned by Devonshire St, Blue Creek, Chatsworth St, Balboa Blvd, Kingsbury St, Genesta Ave, Aliso Canyon Wash, and Ronald Reagan Freeway.

The 32nd and 30th are partitioned by Lankershim Blvd, Fredonia Dr, Cahuenga Blvd W, Broadlawn Dr, Multiview Dr, Mulholland Dr, Laurel Canyon Blvd, W Sunset Blvd, Ozeta Ter, and Doheny Rd.

The 32nd and 36th are N Hillcrest Rd/La Collina Dr, N Hillcrest Rd/Sierra Mar Pl, Crescent Dr, Walker Dr/Sunset Pl, Meredith Pl/Castle Pl, Loma Vista Dr, Cherokee Ln, Schuyler Rd, Greystone Park, Readcrest Dr/Miradero Rd, Coldwater Canyon Dr/Lindacrest Dr, Lago Vista Dr, N Beverly Dr, Tower Grove Dr/Tower Rd, W Sunset Blvd, Veteran Ave, Wilshire Blvd, Malcolm Ave, Glendon Ave, Santa Monica Blvd, Pontius Ave, Cotner Ave, Purdue Ave, Butler Ave, Centinela Ave, Centinela Ave/S Carmelina Ave, Montana Ave, 26th St, and Adelaide Dr.

=== Cities and CDPs with 10,000 or more people ===
- Los Angeles – 3,820,914
- Bell Gardens – 39,501
- Malibu – 10,654

=== 2,500 – 10,000 people ===
- Topanga – 8,560
- Pepperdine University – 2,747

== Future composition ==
Beginning with the 2026 election, the 32nd district will consist of the following counties:

- Los Angeles (part)
- Ventura (part)

== List of members representing the district ==
Member	Party	Dates	Cong ress(es)	Electoral history	Counties
District created January 3, 1963
Craig Hosmer (Long Beach)	Republican	January 3, 1963 – December 31, 1974	88th 89th 90th 91st 92nd 93rd	Redistricted from the 18th district and re-elected in 1962. Re-elected in 1964. Re-elected in 1966. Re-elected in 1968. Re-elected in 1970. Re-elected in 1972. Resigned.	1963–1969; Los Angeles
Craig Hosmer (Long Beach)	Republican	January 3, 1963 – December 31, 1974	88th 89th 90th 91st 92nd 93rd	Redistricted from the 18th district and re-elected in 1962. Re-elected in 1964. Re-elected in 1966. Re-elected in 1968. Re-elected in 1970. Re-elected in 1972. Resigned.	1969–1973; Los Angeles, Orange
Craig Hosmer (Long Beach)	Republican	January 3, 1963 – December 31, 1974	88th 89th 90th 91st 92nd 93rd	Redistricted from the 18th district and re-elected in 1962. Re-elected in 1964. Re-elected in 1966. Re-elected in 1968. Re-elected in 1970. Re-elected in 1972. Resigned.	1973–1975; Los Angeles
Vacant		December 31, 1974 – January 3, 1975	93rd		1973–1975; Los Angeles
Glenn M. Anderson (Los Angeles)	Democratic	January 3, 1975 – January 3, 1993	94th 95th 96th 97th 98th 99th 100th 101st 102nd	Redistricted from the 35th district and re-elected in 1974. Re-elected in 1976. Re-elected in 1978. Re-elected in 1980. Re-elected in 1982. Re-elected in 1984. Re-elected in 1986. Re-elected in 1988. Re-elected in 1990. Retired.	1975–1983; Los Angeles
Glenn M. Anderson (Los Angeles)	Democratic	January 3, 1975 – January 3, 1993	94th 95th 96th 97th 98th 99th 100th 101st 102nd	Redistricted from the 35th district and re-elected in 1974. Re-elected in 1976. Re-elected in 1978. Re-elected in 1980. Re-elected in 1982. Re-elected in 1984. Re-elected in 1986. Re-elected in 1988. Re-elected in 1990. Retired.	1983–1993; Los Angeles (Long Beach)
Julian C. Dixon (Los Angeles)	Democratic	January 3, 1993 – December 8, 2000	103rd 104th 105th 106th	Redistricted from the 28th district and re-elected in 1992. Re-elected in 1994. Re-elected in 1996. Re-elected in 1998. Re-elected in 2000, but died before his next term began.	1993–2003; Los Angeles (Culver City)
Vacant		December 8, 2000 – June 5, 2001	106th 107th		1993–2003; Los Angeles (Culver City)
Diane Watson (Los Angeles)	Democratic	June 5, 2001 – January 3, 2003	107th	Elected to finish Dixon's term. Redistricted to the 33rd district.	1993–2003; Los Angeles (Culver City)
Hilda Solis (El Monte)	Democratic	January 3, 2003 – February 24, 2009	108th 109th 110th 111th	Redistricted from the 31st district and re-elected in 2002. Re-elected in 2004. Re-elected in 2006. Re-elected in 2008. Resigned to become U.S. Secretary of Labor.	2003–2013 Los Angeles (Baldwin Park, Covina)
Vacant		February 24, 2009 – July 14, 2009	111th		2003–2013 Los Angeles (Baldwin Park, Covina)
Judy Chu (Monterey Park)	Democratic	July 14, 2009 – January 3, 2013	111th 112th	Elected to finish Solis's term. Re-elected in 2010. Redistricted to the 27th district.	2003–2013 Los Angeles (Baldwin Park, Covina)
Grace Napolitano (Norwalk)	Democratic	January 3, 2013 – January 3, 2023	113th 114th 115th 116th 117th	Redistricted from the 38th district and re-elected in 2012. Re-elected in 2014. Re-elected in 2016. Re-elected in 2018. Re-elected in 2020. Redistricted to the 31st district.	2013–2023 San Gabriel Valley including El Monte and West Covina
Brad Sherman (Los Angeles)	Democratic	January 3, 2023 – present	118th 119th	Redistricted from the 30th district and re-elected in 2022. Re-elected in 2024. Re-elected in 2026.	2023–present Western San Fernando Valley of Los Angeles County and the eastern Simi Hills of Ventura County

== Election results ==
=== 1962 ===
1962 United States House of Representatives elections in California
Party	Candidate	Votes	%
Republican	Craig Hosmer (Incumbent)	115,915	70.2
Democratic	J. J. Johovich	47,917	29.8
Total votes		163,832	100.0
Republican hold			

=== 1964 ===
1964 United States House of Representatives elections in California
Party	Candidate	Votes	%
Republican	Craig Hosmer (Incumbent)	132,603	68.9
Democratic	Michael Cullen	59,765	31.1
Total votes		192,368	100.0
Republican hold			

=== 1966 ===
1966 United States House of Representatives elections in California
Party	Candidate	Votes	%
Republican	Craig Hosmer (Incumbent)	139,328	80.1
Democratic	Tracy Odell	34,609	19.9
Total votes		173,937	100.0
Republican hold			

=== 1968 ===
1968 United States House of Representatives elections in California
Party	Candidate	Votes	%
Republican	Craig Hosmer (Incumbent)	138,494	73.8
Democratic	Arthur J. Gottlieb	45,308	24.1
American Independent	Richard B. Williams	3,898	2.1
Total votes		187,700	100.0
Republican hold			

=== 1970 ===
1970 United States House of Representatives elections in California
Party	Candidate	Votes	%
Republican	Craig Hosmer (Incumbent)	119,340	71.5
Democratic	Walter L. Mallonee	44,278	26.5
Peace and Freedom	John S. Donohue	3,227	2.0
Total votes		166,845	100.0
Republican hold			

=== 1972 ===
1972 United States House of Representatives elections in California
Party	Candidate	Votes	%
Republican	Craig Hosmer (Incumbent)	147,016	65.9
Democratic	Dennis Murray	71,394	32.0
Peace and Freedom	John S. Donohue	4,804	2.1
Total votes		223,214	100.0
Republican hold			

=== 1974 ===
1974 United States House of Representatives elections in California
Party	Candidate	Votes	%
Democratic	Glenn M. Anderson (Incumbent)	82,485	87.7
American Independent	Virgil V. Badalich	8,710	9.2
Peace and Freedom	Frank H. Walker	2,877	3.1
Total votes		94,072	100.0
Democratic hold			

=== 1976 ===
1976 United States House of Representatives elections in California
Party	Candidate	Votes	%
Democratic	Glenn M. Anderson (Incumbent)	92,034	72.2
Republican	Clifford O. Young	35,394	27.8
Total votes		127,428	100.0
Democratic hold			

=== 1978 ===
1978 United States House of Representatives elections in California
Party	Candidate	Votes	%
Democratic	Glenn M. Anderson (Incumbent)	74,004	71.4
Republican	Sonya Mathison	23,242	22.4
American Independent	Ida Bader	6,363	6.2
Total votes		103,609	100.0
Democratic hold			

=== 1980 ===
1980 United States House of Representatives elections in California
Party	Candidate	Votes	%
Democratic	Glenn M. Anderson (Incumbent)	84,057	65.9
Republican	John R. Adler	39,260	30.8
Libertarian	Thomas A. Cosgrove	4,209	3.3
Total votes		127,526	100.0
Democratic hold			

=== 1982 ===
1982 United States House of Representatives elections in California
Party	Candidate	Votes	%
Democratic	Glenn M. Anderson (Incumbent)	84,663	58.0
Republican	Brian F. Lungren	57,863	39.6
Peace and Freedom	Eugene E. Ryle	3,473	2.4
Total votes		145,999	100.0
Democratic hold			

=== 1984 ===
1984 United States House of Representatives elections in California
Party	Candidate	Votes	%
Democratic	Glenn M. Anderson (Incumbent)	102,961	60.7
Republican	Roger E. Fiola	62,176	36.6
Libertarian	Mark F. Denny	2,517	1.5
Peace and Freedom	Patrick John McCoy	2,051	1.2
Total votes		169,705	100.0
Democratic hold			

=== 1986 ===
1986 United States House of Representatives elections in California
Party	Candidate	Votes	%
Democratic	Glenn M. Anderson (Incumbent)	90,739	68.5
Republican	Joyce M. Robertson	39,003	29.4
Peace and Freedom	John S. Donohue	2,799	2.1
Total votes		132,541	100.0
Democratic hold			

=== 1988 ===
1988 United States House of Representatives elections in California
Party	Candidate	Votes	%
Democratic	Glenn M. Anderson (Incumbent)	114,666	66.9
Republican	Sanford W. Kahn	50,710	29.6
Peace and Freedom	Vikki Murdock	4,032	2.4
Libertarian	Marc F. Denny	1,941	1.1
Total votes		171,349	100.0
Democratic hold			

=== 1990 ===
1990 United States House of Representatives elections in California
Party	Candidate	Votes	%
Democratic	Glenn M. Anderson (Incumbent)	68,268	61.5
Republican	Sanford W. Kahn	42,692	38.5
Total votes		110,960	
Democratic hold			

=== 1992 ===
1992 United States House of Representatives elections in California
Party	Candidate	Votes	%
Democratic	Julian C. Dixon (Incumbent)	150,644	87.2
Libertarian	Robert G. "Bob" Weber Jr.	12,834	7.2
Peace and Freedom	William R. Williams II	9,782	5.6
Independent	Leanick-Beltran (write-in)	2	0.0
Total votes		173,262	100.0
Democratic hold			

=== 1994 ===
1994 United States House of Representatives elections in California
Party	Candidate	Votes	%
Democratic	Julian C. Dixon (Incumbent)	98,017	77.6
Republican	Ernie A. Farhat	22,190	17.6
Peace and Freedom	John Honigsfeld	6,099	4.8
Total votes		126,306	100.0
Democratic hold			

=== 1996 ===
1996 United States House of Representatives elections in California
Party	Candidate	Votes	%
Democratic	Julian C. Dixon (Incumbent)	124,712	82.4
Republican	Larry Ardito	18,768	12.4
Libertarian	Neal Donner	6,390	4.2
Natural Law	Rashied Jibri	1,557	1.0
Total votes		151,427	100.0
Democratic hold			

=== 1998 ===
1998 United States House of Representatives elections in California
Party	Candidate	Votes	%
Democratic	Julian C. Dixon (Incumbent)	112,253	86.7
Republican	Laurence Ardito	14,622	11.3
Libertarian	Velko Milosevich	2,617	2.0
Total votes		129,492	100.0
Democratic hold			

=== 2000 ===
2000 United States House of Representatives elections in California
Party	Candidate	Votes	%
Democratic	Julian C. Dixon (Incumbent)	137,447	83.6
Republican	Kathy Williamson	19,924	12.2
Libertarian	Bob Weber	3,875	2.3
Natural Law	Rashied Jibri	3,281	1.9
Total votes		164,527	100.0
Democratic hold			

=== 2001 (Special) ===
2001 California's 32nd congressional district special election
Party	Candidate	Votes	%
Democratic	Diane Watson	75,584	71.4
Republican	Noel Irwin Hentschel	20,088	19.0
Green	Donna J. Warren	3,792	3.6
Reform	Ezola B. Foster	1,557	1.5
Invalid or blank votes		4,575	4.5
Total votes		105,596	100.0
Turnout			37.6
Democratic hold			

=== 2002 ===
2002 United States House of Representatives elections in California
Party	Candidate	Votes	%
Democratic	Hilda Solis (Incumbent)	58,530	68.8
Republican	Emma E. Fischbeck	23,366	27.5
Libertarian	Michael "Mick" McGuire	3,183	3.7
Total votes		85,079	100.0
Democratic hold			

=== 2004 ===
2004 United States House of Representatives elections in California
Party	Candidate	Votes	%
Democratic	Hilda Solis (Incumbent)	119,144	85.1
Libertarian	Leland Faegre	21,002	14.9
Total votes		140,146	100.0
Democratic hold			

=== 2006 ===
2006 United States House of Representatives elections in California
Party	Candidate	Votes	%
Democratic	Hilda Solis (Incumbent)	76,059	83.0
Libertarian	Leland Faegre	21,002	17.0
Total votes		97,061	100.0
Democratic hold			

=== 2008 ===
2008 United States House of Representatives elections in California
Party	Candidate	Votes	%
Democratic	Hilda Solis (Incumbent)	130,142	100.0
Independent	Innocent Osunwa (write-in)	8	0.0
Total votes		130,150	100.0
Turnout			53.6
Democratic hold			

=== 2009 (Special) ===
2009 California's 32nd congressional district special election
Party	Candidate	Votes	%
Democratic	Judy Chu	16,194	61.8
Republican	Betty Tom Chu	8,630	33.0
Libertarian	Christopher Agrella	1,356	5.2
Independent	Eleanor Garcia (write-in)	2	0.0
Invalid or blank votes		1,240	4.7
Total votes		26,182	100.0
Turnout			10.7
Democratic hold			

=== 2010 ===
2010 United States House of Representatives elections in California
Party	Candidate	Votes	%
Democratic	Judy Chu (Incumbent)	77,759	71.0
Republican	Edward Schmerling	31,697	29.0
Total votes		109,456	100.0
Democratic hold			

=== 2012 ===
2012 United States House of Representatives elections in California
Party	Candidate	Votes	%
Democratic	Grace Napolitano (Incumbent)	124,903	65.7
Republican	David L. Miller	65,208	34.3
Total votes		190,111	100.0
Democratic hold			

=== 2014 ===
2014 United States House of Representatives elections in California
Party	Candidate	Votes	%
Democratic	Grace Napolitano (Incumbent)	50,353	59.7
Republican	Arturo Enrique Alas	34,053	40.3
Total votes		84,406	100.0
Democratic hold			

=== 2016 ===
2016 United States House of Representatives elections in California
Party	Candidate	Votes	%
Democratic	Grace Napolitano (Incumbent)	114,926	61.6
Democratic	Roger Hernández (withdrawn)	71,720	38.4
Total votes		186,464	100.0
Democratic hold			

=== 2018 ===
2018 United States House of Representatives elections in California
Party	Candidate	Votes	%
Democratic	Grace Napolitano (Incumbent)	121,759	68.8
Republican	Joshua Scott	55,272	31.2
Total votes		177,031	100.0
Democratic hold			

=== 2020 ===
2020 United States House of Representatives elections in California
Party	Candidate	Votes	%
Democratic	Grace Napolitano (incumbent)	172,942	66.6
Republican	Joshua M. Scott	86,818	33.4
Total votes		259,760	100.0
Democratic hold			

=== 2022 ===
2022 United States House of Representatives elections in California
Party	Candidate	Votes	%
Democratic	Brad Sherman (incumbent)	167,411	69.2
Republican	Lucie Lapointe Volotzky	74,618	30.8
Total votes		242,029	100.0
Democratic hold			

=== 2024 ===
California's 32nd congressional district, 2024
Primary election
Party	Candidate	Votes	%
Democratic	Brad Sherman (incumbent)	91,952	58.6
Republican	Larry Thompson	29,939	19.1
Republican	James Shuster	16,601	10.6
Democratic	Christopher Ahuja	12,637	8.1
Democratic	Douglas Smith	2,504	1.6
Democratic	David Abbitt	1,665	1.1
Democratic	Trevor Witt (withdrawn)	1,635	1.0
Total votes		156,933	100.0
General election
Democratic	Brad Sherman (incumbent)	212,934	66.2
Republican	Larry Thompson	108,711	33.8
Total votes		321,645	100.0
Democratic hold			

== Historical district boundaries ==
From 2003 through 2013, the district consisted of parts of eastern Los Angeles, including Covina, Baldwin Park and El Monte. Due to redistricting after the 2010 United States census, the district moved slightly south within Los Angeles County but still includes most of the previous areas.

== See also ==
- List of United States congressional districts
- California's congressional districts
