= California's 35th congressional district =

U.S. House district for California

Coordinates: 34°02′43″N 117°35′18″W

- Interactive map of district boundaries
- Representative: Norma Torres; D–Pomona
- Population (2025): 771,326
- Median household income: $94,060
- Ethnicity: 64.3% Hispanic; 14.9% White; 11.6% Asian; 6.0% Black; 2.2% Two or more races; 0.9% other
- Cook PVI: D+8

California's 35th congressional district is a U.S. congressional district in California. The district is currently represented by Democrat Norma Torres.

The district is based in the Inland Empire, and encompasses parts of San Bernardino and Los Angeles counties. It includes the communities of Chino, Eastvale, Fontana, Montclair, Ontario, Pomona, Rancho Cucamonga, and Upland.

== Recent election results from statewide races ==
=== 2023–2027 boundaries ===
Year	Office	Results
2008	President	Obama 63% - 36%
2010	Governor	Brown 55% - 37%
2010	Lt. Governor	Newsom 49% - 35%
2010	Secretary of State	Bowen 55% - 35%
2010	Attorney General	Harris 47% - 43%
2010	Treasurer	Lockyer 58% - 33%
2010	Controller	Chiang 55% - 34%
2012	President	Obama 65% - 35%
2014	Governor	Brown 57% - 43%
2016	President	Clinton 65% - 30%
2018	Governor	Newsom 63% - 37%
2018	Attorney General	Becerra 65% - 35%
2020	President	Biden 63% - 35%
2022	Senate (Reg.)	Padilla 57% - 43%
2022	Governor	Newsom 55% - 45%
2022	Lt. Governor	Kounalakis 55% - 45%
2022	Secretary of State	Weber 56% - 44%
2022	Attorney General	Bonta 56% - 44%
2022	Treasurer	Ma 55% - 45%
2022	Controller	Cohen 54% - 46%
2024	President	Harris 54% - 43%
2024	Senate (Reg.)	Schiff 55% - 45%

=== 2027–2033 boundaries ===
Year	Office	Results
2008	President	Obama 63% - 36%
2010	Governor	Brown 55% - 37%
2010	Lt. Governor	Newsom 49% - 35%
2010	Secretary of State	Bowen 55% - 35%
2010	Attorney General	Harris 47% - 43%
2010	Treasurer	Lockyer 58% - 33%
2010	Controller	Chiang 55% - 34%
2012	President	Obama 65% - 35%
2014	Governor	Brown 57% - 43%
2016	President	Clinton 65% - 30%
2018	Governor	Newsom 63% - 37%
2018	Attorney General	Becerra 65% - 35%
2020	President	Biden 63% - 35%
2022	Senate (Reg.)	Padilla 57% - 43%
2022	Governor	Newsom 55% - 45%
2022	Lt. Governor	Kounalakis 55% - 45%
2022	Secretary of State	Weber 56% - 44%
2022	Attorney General	Bonta 56% - 44%
2022	Treasurer	Ma 55% - 45%
2022	Controller	Cohen 54% - 46%
2024	President	Harris 54% - 43%
2024	Senate (Reg.)	Schiff 55% - 45%

== Composition ==
FIPS County Code	County	Seat	Population
37	Los Angeles	Los Angeles	9,663,345
65	Riverside	Riverside	2,492,442
71	San Bernardino	San Bernardino	2,195,611

Under the 2020 redistricting, California's 35th congressional district is located within the Inland Empire in Southern California. The district covers east Los Angeles County, southwest San Bernardino County, and a small part of west Riverside County. The area in Los Angeles County includes the city of Pomona. The area in San Bernardino County includes Chino, Montclair, Ontario; the south sides of Rancho Cucamonga, Fontana, and Upland; and the Los Serranos neighborhood of Chino Hills. The area in Riverside County includes the north side of the city of Eastvale.

Los Angeles County is split between this district, the 28th district, the 31st district, and the 38th district. They are partitioned by Highway 60, Phillips Ranch Rd, E Village Loop Rd, Quail Creek Ln, Falcon Ridge Dr, Hidden Valley Rd, Oak Cliff Dr, Willowbrook Ln, Westbrook Ln, La Sierra Dr, Avenida Rancheros, Rancheros Navato Dr, Serra Dr, Alta Mira Pl, Rancho Laguna Dr, W Mission Blvd, W Temple Ave, Pomona Blvd, Valley Blvd, San Bernardino Freeway, Walnut City Parkland, San Bernardino Freeway, Fairplex Dr, Via Verde, Puddingstone Reservoir, McKinley Ave, N Whittle Ave, Arrow Highway, Fulton Rd, Foothill Blvd, Towne Ave, Harrison Ave, Carnegie Ave, W Arrow Highway, Mountain Ave, and E American Ave.

San Bernardino County is split between this district, the 28th district, the 33rd district, and the 40th district. The 35th, 28th and 33rd are partitioned by W 16th St, E 15th St, Grove Ave, Foothill Blvd, Vineyard Blvd, San Bernardino Rd, Orangewood Dr, Estacia St, Lion St, Highway 66, Helms Ave, Hampshire St, Archibald Ave, N Maple Ave, S Maple Ave, Randall Ave, Alder Ave, Union Pacific Railroad, Slover Ave, Tamarind Ave, Jurupa Ave, 11th St, and Locust Ave. The 35th and 40th are partitioned by Highway 71, Eucalyptus Ave, Peyton Dr, Highway 142, Tupelo Ave, Hazelwood Dr, Pipeline Ave, Los Serranos Blvd, Country Club Dr, Soquel Canyon Parkway, Elinvar Dr, Sapphire Rd, Onyx Rd, Copper Rd, Slate Dr, Butterfield Ranch Rd, Pine Ave, and Chino Valley Freeway.

Riverside County is split between this district and the 41st district. They are partitioned by Chino Creek, Santa Ana River, Chandler St, Archibald Ave, Schleisman Rd, Scholar Way, Citrus Way, Hamner Ave, Corona Freeway, and E Philadelphia St.

=== Cities and CDPs with 10,000 or more people ===
- Fontana – 212,704
- Ontario – 175,265
- Rancho Cucamonga – 174,405
- Pomona – 151,713
- Chino – 93,114
- Upland – 79,040
- Chino Hills – 78,411
- Eastvale – 69,757
- Montclair – 37,865

== List of members representing the district ==
Member	Party	Dates	Cong ress(es)	Electoral history	Counties
District created January 3, 1963
James B. Utt (Santa Ana)	Republican	January 3, 1963 – March 1, 1970	88th 89th 90th 91st	Redistricted from the 28th district and re-elected in 1962. Re-elected in 1964. Re-elected in 1966. Re-elected in 1968. Died.	1963–1969; Orange, San Diego
James B. Utt (Santa Ana)	Republican	January 3, 1963 – March 1, 1970	88th 89th 90th 91st	Redistricted from the 28th district and re-elected in 1962. Re-elected in 1964. Re-elected in 1966. Re-elected in 1968. Died.	1969–1973; Orange, San Diego
Vacant		March 1, 1970 – June 30, 1970	91st		1969–1973; Orange, San Diego
John G. Schmitz (Santa Ana)	Republican	June 30, 1970 – January 3, 1973	91st 92nd	Elected to finish Utt's term. Re-elected in 1970. Redistricted to the 39th district and lost renomination.	1969–1973; Orange, San Diego
Glenn M. Anderson (Los Angeles)	Democratic	January 3, 1973 – January 3, 1975	93rd	Redistricted from the 17th district and re-elected in 1972. Redistricted to the 32nd district.	1973–1975; Los Angeles
James F. Lloyd (West Covina)	Democratic	January 3, 1975 – January 3, 1981	94th 95th 96th	Elected in 1974. Re-elected in 1976. Re-elected in 1978. Lost re-election.	1975–1983; Los Angeles, Southwestern San Bernardino
David Dreier (La Verne)	Republican	January 3, 1981 – January 3, 1983	97th	Elected in 1980. Redistricted to the 33rd district.	1975–1983; Los Angeles, Southwestern San Bernardino
Jerry Lewis (Redlands)	Republican	January 3, 1983 – January 3, 1993	98th 99th 100th 101st 102nd	Redistricted from the 37th district and re-elected in 1982. Re-elected in 1984. Re-elected in 1986. Re-elected in 1988. Re-elected in 1990. Redistricted to the 40th district.	1983–1993; San Bernardino
Maxine Waters (Los Angeles)	Democratic	January 3, 1993 – January 3, 2013	103rd 104th 105th 106th 107th 108th 109th 110th 111th 112th	Redistricted from the 29th district and re-elected in 1992. Re-elected in 1994. Re-elected in 1996. Re-elected in 1998. Re-elected in 2000. Re-elected in 2002. Re-elected in 2004. Re-elected in 2006. Re-elected in 2008. Re-elected in 2010. Redistricted to the 43rd district.	1993–2003; South Los Angeles
Maxine Waters (Los Angeles)	Democratic	January 3, 1993 – January 3, 2013	103rd 104th 105th 106th 107th 108th 109th 110th 111th 112th	Redistricted from the 29th district and re-elected in 1992. Re-elected in 1994. Re-elected in 1996. Re-elected in 1998. Re-elected in 2000. Re-elected in 2002. Re-elected in 2004. Re-elected in 2006. Re-elected in 2008. Re-elected in 2010. Redistricted to the 43rd district.	2003–2013 South Los Angeles
Gloria Negrete McLeod (Chino)	Democratic	January 3, 2013 – January 3, 2015	113th	Elected in 2012. Retired to run for the San Bernardino County Board of Supervisors	2013–2023 Inland Empire (Fontana, Ontario, and Pomona)
Norma Torres (Pomona)	Democratic	January 3, 2015 – present	114th 115th 116th 117th 118th 119th	Elected in 2014. Re-elected in 2016. Re-elected in 2018. Re-elected in 2020. Re-elected in 2022. Re-elected in 2024. Re-elected in 2026.	2013–2023 Inland Empire (Fontana, Ontario, and Pomona)
Norma Torres (Pomona)	Democratic	January 3, 2015 – present	114th 115th 116th 117th 118th 119th	Elected in 2014. Re-elected in 2016. Re-elected in 2018. Re-elected in 2020. Re-elected in 2022. Re-elected in 2024. Re-elected in 2026.	2023–present Inland Empire (Fontana, Ontario, and Pomona)

== Election results ==
=== 1962 ===
1962 United States House of Representatives elections in California
Party	Candidate	Votes	%
Republican	James B. Utt (incumbent)	133,737	68.5
Democratic	Burton Shamsky	61,395	31.5
Total votes		195,132	100.0
Republican hold			

=== 1964 ===
1964 United States House of Representatives elections in California
Party	Candidate	Votes	%
Republican	James B. Utt (incumbent)	167,791	65.0
Democratic	Paul B. Carpenter	90,295	35.0
Total votes		258,086	100.0
Republican hold			

=== 1966 ===
1966 United States House of Representatives elections in California
Party	Candidate	Votes	%
Republican	James B. Utt (incumbent)	189,582	73.1
Democratic	Thomas B. Lenhart	69,873	26.9
Total votes		259,455	100.0
Republican hold			

=== 1968 ===
1968 United States House of Representatives elections in California
Party	Candidate	Votes	%
Republican	James B. Utt (incumbent)	212,684	72.5
Democratic	Thomas B. Lenhart	73,778	25.1
American Independent	Annie McDonald	7,000	2.4
Total votes		293,462	100.0
Republican hold			

=== 1970 (special) ===
1970 California's 35th congressional district special election
Party	Candidate	Votes	%
Republican	John G. Schmitz	67,209	72.4
Democratic	David N. Hartman	25,655	27.6
Total votes		92,864	100.0
Republican hold			

=== 1970 ===
1970 United States House of Representatives elections in California
Party	Candidate	Votes	%
Republican	John G. Schmitz (incumbent)	192,765	67.0
Democratic	Thomas B. Lenhart	87,019	30.3
Peace and Freedom	Francis R. Halpern	7,742	2.7
Total votes		287,526	100.0
Republican hold			

=== 1972 ===
1972 United States House of Representatives elections in California
Party	Candidate	Votes	%
Democratic	Glenn M. Anderson (incumbent)	103,912	74.8
Republican	Vernon E. Brown	35,018	25.2
Total votes		138,930	100.0
Democratic hold			

=== 1974 ===
1974 United States House of Representatives elections in California
Party	Candidate	Votes	%
Democratic	James F. Lloyd	60,709	50.3
Republican	Victor Veysey (incumbent)	60,102	49.7
Total votes		120,811	100.0
Democratic gain from Republican			

=== 1976 ===
1976 United States House of Representatives elections in California
Party	Candidate	Votes	%
Democratic	James F. Lloyd (incumbent)	87,472	53.3
Republican	Louis Brutocao	76,765	46.7
Total votes		164,237	100.0
Democratic hold			

=== 1978 ===
1978 United States House of Representatives elections in California
Party	Candidate	Votes	%
Democratic	James F. Lloyd (incumbent)	80,388	54.0
Republican	David Dreier	68,442	46.0
Total votes		148,830	100.0
Democratic hold			

=== 1980 ===
1980 United States House of Representatives elections in California
Party	Candidate	Votes	%
Republican	David Dreier	100,743	51.8
Democratic	James F. Lloyd (incumbent)	88,279	45.4
Peace and Freedom	James Michael "Mike" Noonan	5,492	2.8
Total votes		194,514	100.0
Republican gain from Democratic			

=== 1982 ===
1982 United States House of Representatives elections in California
Party	Candidate	Votes	%
Republican	Jerry Lewis (incumbent)	112,786	68.3
Democratic	Robert E. Erwin	52,349	31.7
Total votes		165,135	100.0
Republican hold			

=== 1984 ===
1984 United States House of Representatives elections in California
Party	Candidate	Votes	%
Republican	Jerry Lewis (incumbent)	176,477	85.5
Peace and Freedom	Kevin Akin	29,990	14.5
Total votes		206,467	100.0
Republican hold			

=== 1986 ===
1986 United States House of Representatives elections in California
Party	Candidate	Votes	%
Republican	Jerry Lewis (incumbent)	127,235	76.9
Democratic	Robert J. "Sarge" Hall	38,322	23.1
Total votes		165,557	100.0
Republican hold			

=== 1988 ===
1988 United States House of Representatives elections in California
Party	Candidate	Votes	%
Republican	Jerry Lewis (incumbent)	181,203	70.4
Democratic	Paul Sweeney	71,186	27.7
Libertarian	Jeff Shuman	4,879	1.9
Total votes		257,268	100.0
Republican hold			

=== 1990 ===
1990 United States House of Representatives elections in California
Party	Candidate	Votes	%
Republican	Jerry Lewis (incumbent)	121,602	60.6
Democratic	Barry Borton	66,100	32.9
Libertarian	Jerry Johnson	13,020	6.5
Total votes		200,722	100.0
Republican hold			

=== 1992 ===
1992 United States House of Representatives elections in California
Party	Candidate	Votes	%
Democratic	Maxine Waters (incumbent)	102,941	82.5
Republican	Nate Truman	17,417	14.0
Peace and Freedom	Alice Mae Miles	2,797	2.2
Libertarian	Carin Rogers	1,618	1.3
American Independent	Gordon Mego (write-in)	3	0.0
Total votes		124,776	100.0
Democratic hold			

=== 1994 ===
1994 United States House of Representatives elections in California
Party	Candidate	Votes	%
Democratic	Maxine Waters (incumbent)	65,688	78.1
Republican	Nate Truman	18,930	21.9
American Independent	Gordon Mego (write-in)	3	0.0
Total votes		84,521	100.0
Democratic hold			

=== 1996 ===
1996 United States House of Representatives elections in California
Party	Candidate	Votes	%
Democratic	Maxine Waters (incumbent)	92,762	85.6
Republican	Eric Carlson	13,116	12.0
American Independent	Gordon Mego	2,610	2.4
Total votes		108,488	100.0
Democratic hold			

=== 1998 ===
1998 United States House of Representatives elections in California
Party	Candidate	Votes	%
Democratic	Maxine Waters (incumbent)	78,732	89.3
American Independent	Gordon Michael Mego	9,413	10.7
Total votes		88,145	100.0
Democratic hold			

=== 2000 ===
2000 United States House of Representatives elections in California
Party	Candidate	Votes	%
Democratic	Maxine Waters (incumbent)	100,569	86.6
Republican	Carl McGill	12,582	10.9
American Independent	Gordon Michael Mego	1,911	1.6
Natural Law	Rick Dunstan	1,153	0.9
Total votes		116,215	100.0
Democratic hold			

=== 2002 ===
2002 United States House of Representatives elections in California
Party	Candidate	Votes	%
Democratic	Maxine Waters (incumbent)	72,401	77.6
Republican	Ross Moen	18,094	19.3
American Independent	Gordon Michael Mego	2,912	3.1
Total votes		93,407	100.0
Democratic hold			

=== 2004 ===
2004 United States House of Representatives elections in California
Party	Candidate	Votes	%
Democratic	Maxine Waters (incumbent)	125,949	80.6
Republican	Ross Moen	23,591	15.1
American Independent	Gordon Michael Mego	3,440	2.2
Libertarian	Charles Tate	3,427	2.1
Total votes		115,807	100.0
Democratic hold			

=== 2006 ===
2006 United States House of Representatives elections in California
Party	Candidate	Votes	%
Democratic	Maxine Waters (incumbent)	82,498	83.8
American Independent	Gordon Michael Mego	8,343	8.5
Libertarian	Paul T. Ireland	7,665	7.7
Total votes		97,506	100.0
Democratic hold			

=== 2008 ===
2008 United States House of Representatives elections in California
Party	Candidate	Votes	%
Democratic	Maxine Waters (incumbent)	150,778	82.6
Republican	Ted Hayes	24,169	13.2
Libertarian	Herb Peters	7,632	4.2
Total votes		182,579	100.0
Democratic hold			

=== 2010 ===
2010 United States House of Representatives elections in California
Party	Candidate	Votes	%
Democratic	Maxine Waters (incumbent)	98,131	79.3
Republican	K. Bruce Brown	25,561	20.7
Total votes		123,692	100.0
Democratic hold			

=== 2012 ===
2012 United States House of Representatives elections in California
Party	Candidate	Votes	%
Democratic	Gloria Negrete McLeod	79,698	55.9
Democratic	Joe Baca (incumbent)	62,982	44.1
Total votes		142,680	100.0
Democratic hold			

=== 2014 ===
2014 United States House of Representatives elections in California
Party	Candidate	Votes	%
Democratic	Norma Torres	39,502	63.5
Democratic	Christina Gagnier	22,753	36.5
Total votes		62,255	100.0
Democratic hold			

=== 2016 ===
2016 United States House of Representatives elections in California
Party	Candidate	Votes	%
Democratic	Norma Torres (incumbent)	124,044	72.4
Republican	Tyler Fischella	47,309	27.6
Total votes		171,353	100.0
Democratic hold			

=== 2018 ===
2018 United States House of Representatives elections in California
Party	Candidate	Votes	%
Democratic	Norma Torres (incumbent)	103,420	69.4
Republican	Christian Leonel Valiente	45,604	30.6
Total votes		149,024	100.0
Democratic hold			

=== 2020 ===
2020 United States House of Representatives elections in California
Party	Candidate	Votes	%
Democratic	Norma Torres (incumbent)	169,405	69.3
Republican	Mike Cargile	74,941	30.7
Total votes		244,346	100
Democratic hold			

=== 2022 ===
2022 United States House of Representatives elections in California
Party	Candidate	Votes	%
Democratic	Norma Torres (incumbent)	75,121	57.4
Republican	Mike Cargile	55,832	42.6
Total votes		130,953	100.0
Democratic hold			

=== 2024 ===
California's 35th congressional district, 2024
Primary election
Party	Candidate	Votes	%
Democratic	Norma Torres (incumbent)	39,051	48.2
Republican	Mike Cargile	32,082	39.6
Democratic	Melissa May	6,432	7.9
Republican	Vijal Suthar	3,491	4.3
Total votes		81,056	100.0
General election
Democratic	Norma Torres (incumbent)	136,413	58.4
Republican	Mike Cargile	97,142	41.6
Total votes		233,555	100.0
Democratic hold			

== Historical district boundaries ==
From 2003 to 2013, the district was based in Los Angeles County. The district was composed of parts of the Westchester District of the City of Los Angeles and the cities of Inglewood, Hawthorne, Gardena and Florence-Graham, as well as some adjacent areas.

== See also ==
- List of United States congressional districts
- California's congressional districts
