= Glenn M. Anderson =

American politician (1913–1994)

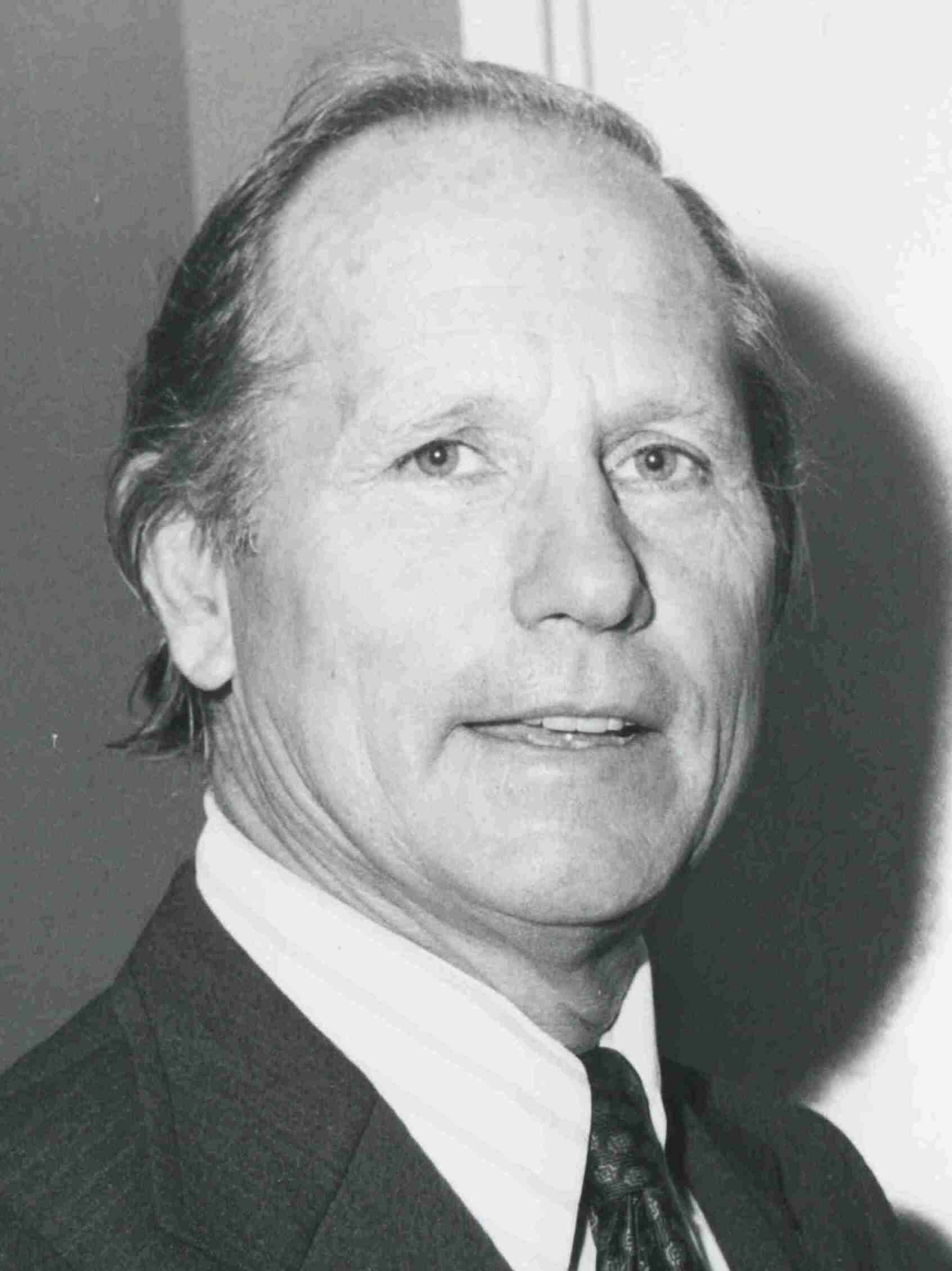
- Anderson in 1975

Chair of House Transportation Committee
- In office March 25, 1988 – January 3, 1991
- Preceded by: James J. Howard
- Succeeded by: Robert A. Roe

Member of the U.S. House of Representatives from California
- In office January 3, 1969 – January 3, 1993
- Preceded by: Cecil R. King
- Succeeded by: Steve Horn (Redistricting)
- Constituency: 17th district (1969–73); 35th district (1973–75); 32nd district (1975–93)

37th Lieutenant Governor of California
- In office January 5, 1959 – January 2, 1967
- Governor: Pat Brown
- Preceded by: Harold J. Powers
- Succeeded by: Robert Finch

Member of the California State Assembly from the 46th district
- In office January 4, 1943 – January 8, 1951
- Preceded by: Jack Tenney
- Succeeded by: Charles Edward Chapel

Mayor of Hawthorne
- In office 1940–1943

Personal details
- Born: February 21, 1913 Hawthorne, California, U.S.
- Died: December 13, 1994 (aged 81) Los Angeles, California, U.S.
- Resting place: Green Hills Memorial Park, Rancho Palos Verdes, California, U.S.
- Party: Democratic
- Education: University of California, Los Angeles

Military service
- Allegiance: United States of America
- Branch/service: United States Army
- Years of service: 1943–1945
- Battles/wars: World War II

Glenn Malcolm Anderson (February 21, 1913 – December 13, 1994) was an American politician. He was the 37th lieutenant governor of California and later represented Southern Los Angeles County (including Carson, San Pedro, and Long Beach) in the U.S. House of Representatives. He was a member of the Democratic Party.

== Early life and education ==
Anderson was born on February 21, 1913, in Hawthorne, California. He received a Bachelor of Arts from University of California, Los Angeles in 1936. He worked as a real estate developer.

=== World War II ===
Anderson served in the United States Army as an infantry sergeant during World War II.

== Career ==
=== California Legislature ===
Anderson was mayor of Hawthorne from 1940 to 1943 and a member of the California State Assembly for the 46th district from 1943 to 1951.

=== Lieutenant Governor ===
He served as lieutenant governor of California from 1959 to 1967, a tenure most notable for his actions relating to the 1965 Watts riots. With Governor Pat Brown vacationing in Greece when the riots broke out in August, 1965, Anderson served as acting governor. When Los Angeles officials urgently requested state support to quell the riots, Anderson waited five hours before granting approval. The subsequent controversy dogged Anderson for the remainder of his career and was a major factor in his 1966 defeat at the hands of Republican Robert Finch.

=== U.S. House ===
Anderson was first elected to the 91st Congress in 1968 and served 12 terms from 1969 to 1993. As a former real estate developer, he successfully sought a seat on the Committee on Public Works and Transportation, of which he would become chair in 1988. His House colleagues claimed that Anderson's abilities slipped dramatically in the late 1980s because of his advancing age. State Democratic leaders went so far as to suggest reapportionment in 1991 that would carve up Anderson's harbor area district. He was removed as Committee Chairman after only 33 months.

He decided not to run for re-election in 1992.

== Death and legacy ==
Anderson underwent multiple heart bypass surgery in 1988. He died on December 13, 1994, at San Pedro Peninsula Hospital Pavilion. The cause of death was complications of Alzheimer's disease. He was 81.

He is interred in Green Hills Memorial Park, Rancho Palos Verdes, California.

The Los Angeles Harbor ship channel is named in his honor, and the Interstate 105 in South Los Angeles is named the "Glenn M. Anderson Freeway".

== Electoral history ==
Glenn M. Anderson electoral history

1968 United States House of Representatives elections in California
Party	Candidate	Votes	%
Democratic	Glenn M. Anderson	75,070	50.7
Republican	Joe Blatchford	71,174	48.1
Peace and Freedom	Ben Dobbs	1,685	1.1
Total votes		147,929	100.0
Turnout			
Democratic hold			

1970 United States House of Representatives elections in California
Party	Candidate	Votes	%
Democratic	Glenn M. Anderson (inc.)	83,739	62.2
Republican	Vernon E. Brown	47,778	35.5
American Independent	Robert W. Copeland	1,724	1.3
Peace and Freedom	Thomas E. Mathews	1,292	1.0
Total votes		134,533	100.0
Turnout			
Democratic hold			

1972 United States House of Representatives elections in California
Party	Candidate	Votes	%
Democratic	Glenn M. Anderson (incumbent)	103,912	74.8
Republican	Vernon E. Brown	35,018	25.2
Total votes		138,930	100.0
Democratic hold			

1974 United States House of Representatives elections in California
Party	Candidate	Votes	%
Democratic	Glenn M. Anderson (Incumbent)	82,485	87.7
American Independent	Virgil V. Badalich	8,710	9.2
Peace and Freedom	Frank H. Walker	2,877	3.1
Total votes		94,072	100.0
Democratic hold			

1976 United States House of Representatives elections in California
Party	Candidate	Votes	%
Democratic	Glenn M. Anderson (Incumbent)	92,034	72.2
Republican	Clifford O. Young	35,394	27.8
Total votes		127,428	100.0
Democratic hold			

1978 United States House of Representatives elections in California
Party	Candidate	Votes	%
Democratic	Glenn M. Anderson (Incumbent)	74,004	71.4
Republican	Sonya Mathison	23,242	22.4
American Independent	Ida Bader	6,363	6.2
Total votes		103,609	100.0
Democratic hold			

1980 United States House of Representatives elections in California
Party	Candidate	Votes	%
Democratic	Glenn M. Anderson (Incumbent)	84,057	65.9
Republican	John R. Adler	39,260	30.8
Libertarian	Thomas A. Cosgrove	4,209	3.3
Total votes		127,526	100.0
Democratic hold			

1982 United States House of Representatives elections in California
Party	Candidate	Votes	%
Democratic	Glenn M. Anderson (Incumbent)	84,663	58.0
Republican	Brian F. Lungren	57,863	39.6
Peace and Freedom	Eugene E. Ryle	3,473	2.4
Total votes		145,999	100.0
Democratic hold			

1984 United States House of Representatives elections in California
Party	Candidate	Votes	%
Democratic	Glenn M. Anderson (Incumbent)	102,961	60.7
Republican	Roger E. Fiola	62,176	36.6
Libertarian	Mark F. Denny	2,517	1.5
Peace and Freedom	Patrick John McCoy	2,051	1.2
Total votes		169,705	100.0
Democratic hold			

1986 United States House of Representatives elections in California
Party	Candidate	Votes	%
Democratic	Glenn M. Anderson (Incumbent)	90,739	68.5
Republican	Joyce M. Robertson	39,003	29.4
Peace and Freedom	John S. Donohue	2,799	2.1
Total votes		132,541	100.0
Democratic hold			

1988 United States House of Representatives elections in California
Party	Candidate	Votes	%
Democratic	Glenn M. Anderson (Incumbent)	114,666	66.9
Republican	Sanford W. Kahn	50,710	29.6
Peace and Freedom	Vikki Murdock	4,032	2.4
Libertarian	Marc F. Denny	1,941	1.1
Total votes		171,349	100.0
Democratic hold			

1990 United States House of Representatives elections in California
Party	Candidate	Votes	%
Democratic	Glenn M. Anderson (Incumbent)	68,268	61.5
Republican	Sanford W. Kahn	42,692	38.5
Total votes		110,960	
Democratic hold			

U.S. House of Representatives
Preceded by Cecil R. King	Member of the U.S. House of Representatives from California's 17th congressional district January 3, 1969 – January 3, 1973	Succeeded by Pete McCloskey
Preceded by John G. Schmitz	Member of the U.S. House of Representatives from California's 35th congressional district January 3, 1973 – January 3, 1975	Succeeded by James F. Lloyd
Preceded by Craig Hosmer	Member of the U.S. House of Representatives from California's 32nd congressional district January 3, 1975 – January 3, 1993	Succeeded by Julian C. Dixon
Political offices
Preceded by Harold J. Powers	Lieutenant Governor of California; January 5, 1959 – January 2, 1967	Succeeded by Robert Finch
Preceded by James J. Howard; New Jersey	Chairman of House Transportation Committee; January 3, 1988 – January 3, 1991	Succeeded by Robert A. Roe; New Jersey
