= Diane Watson =

American politician (born 1933)

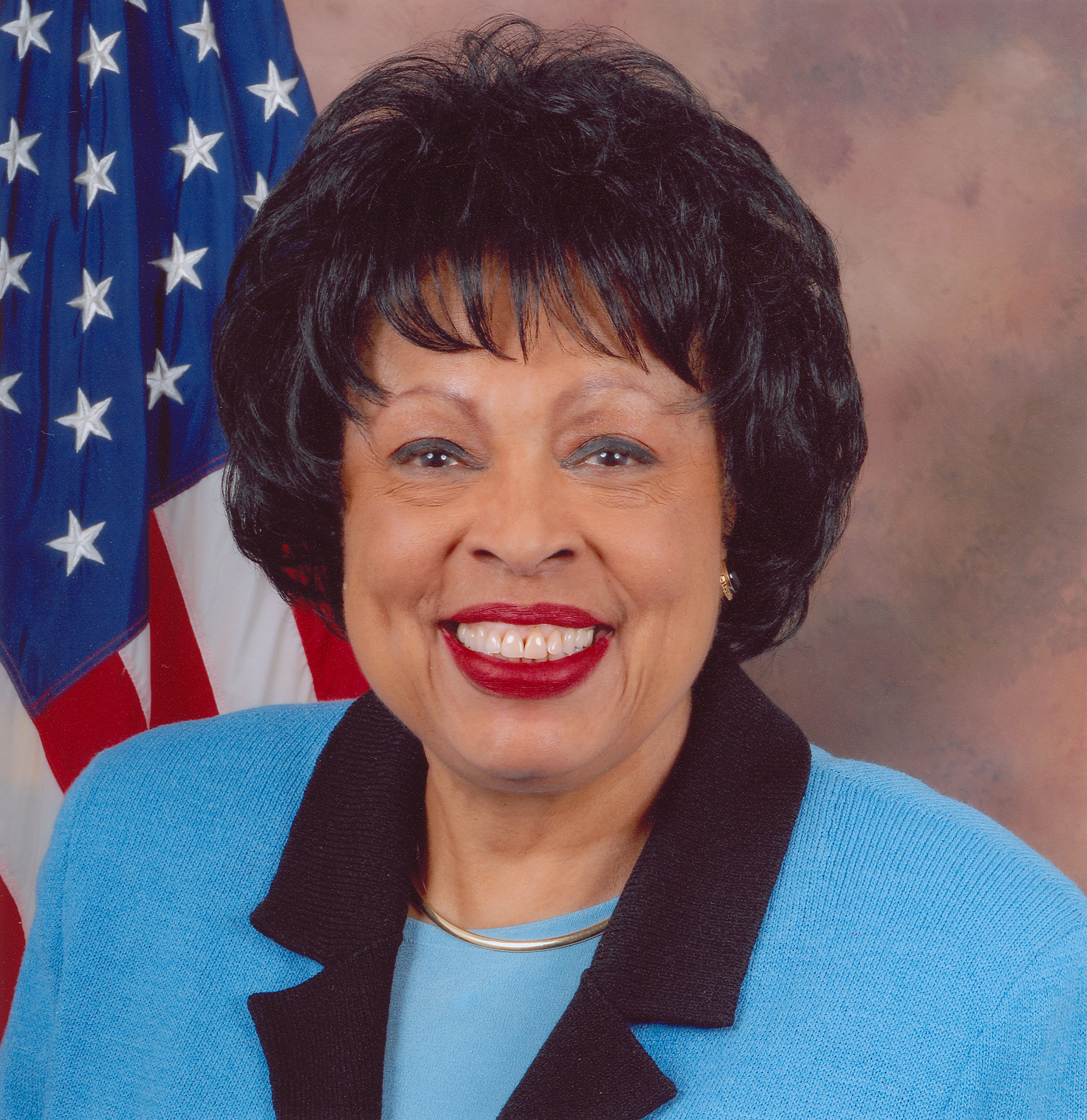

Member of the U.S. House of Representatives from California
- In office June 7, 2001 – January 3, 2011
- Preceded by: Julian Dixon
- Succeeded by: Karen Bass
- Constituency: 32nd district (2001–2003); 33rd district (2003–2011)

United States Ambassador to Micronesia
- In office October 19, 1999 – January 20, 2001
- President: Bill Clinton
- Preceded by: Cheryl Martin (acting)
- Succeeded by: Larry Miles Dinger

Member of the California Senate
- In office December 4, 1978 – November 30, 1998
- Preceded by: Nate Holden
- Succeeded by: Kevin Murray
- Constituency: 30th district (1978–1982); 28th district (1982–1994); 26th district (1994–1998)

Personal details
- Born: Diane Edith Watson; November 12, 1933 (age 92) Los Angeles, California, U.S.
- Party: Democratic
- Education: University of California, Los Angeles (BA); California State University, Los Angeles (MS); Harvard University; Claremont Graduate University (PhD)

Diane Edith Watson (born November 12, 1933) is a former American politician who served as US Representative for California's 33rd congressional district, serving from 2003 until 2011, after first being elected in the 32nd District in a 2001 special election. She is a member of the Democratic Party. The district is located entirely in Los Angeles County and includes much of Central Los Angeles, as well as such wealthy neighborhoods as Los Feliz.

A native of Los Angeles, Watson is a graduate of the University of California, Los Angeles, and also holds degrees from California State University, Los Angeles and Claremont Graduate University. She worked as a psychologist, professor, and health occupation specialist before serving as a member of the Los Angeles Unified School Board (1975–78). She was a member of the California Senate from 1978 to 1998, and the US Ambassador to Micronesia from 1999 to 2000.

Watson was elected to Congress in a 2001 special election to fill the vacancy caused by the death of Representative Julian C. Dixon. She was re-elected four times, and retired after the end of the 111th Congress.

== Early life, education and career ==
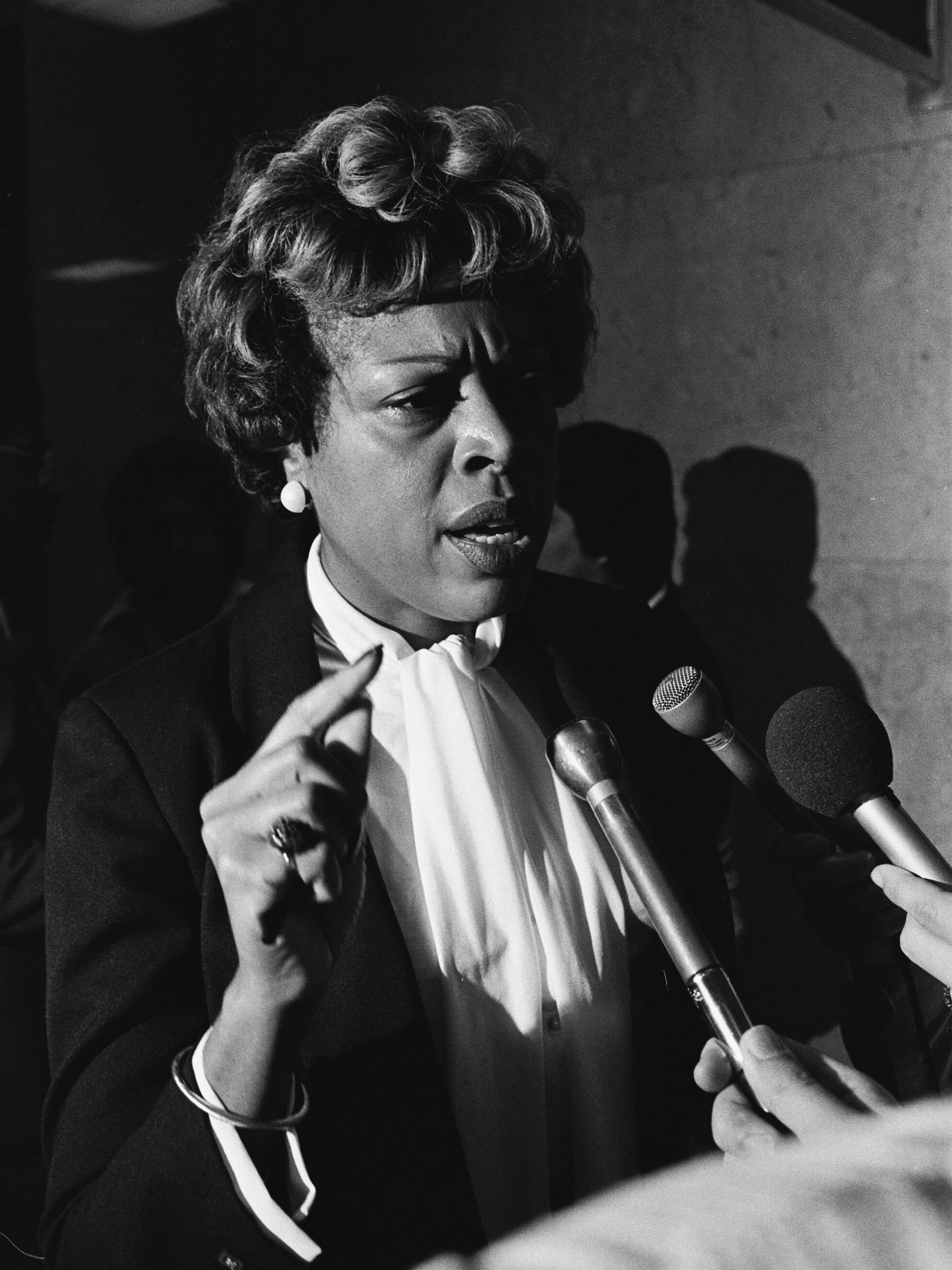
Watson as an LAUSD board member in 1977.

Born in Los Angeles, California, Watson was raised Catholic as the daughter of William Allen Louis Watson and Dorothy Elizabeth O’Neal Watson. According to a DNA analysis, some of her ancestors were from the Central African Republic. She was educated at Dorsey High School, Los Angeles City College and the University of California, Los Angeles, where she earned her BA in Education (1956) and became a member of Alpha Kappa Alpha.

She earned an MS from California State University, Los Angeles in School Psychology (1967) and a PhD in Educational Administration from Claremont Graduate University in 1987. She also attended Harvard Kennedy School at Harvard University between her two postgraduate degrees.

Watson taught elementary school and was a school psychologist in the Los Angeles public schools. She has lectured at California State University, Long Beach and California State University, Los Angeles. She was a health occupation specialist with the California Department of Education's Bureau of Industrial Education, and served on the Los Angeles Unified School District Board of Education.

=== Early political career ===
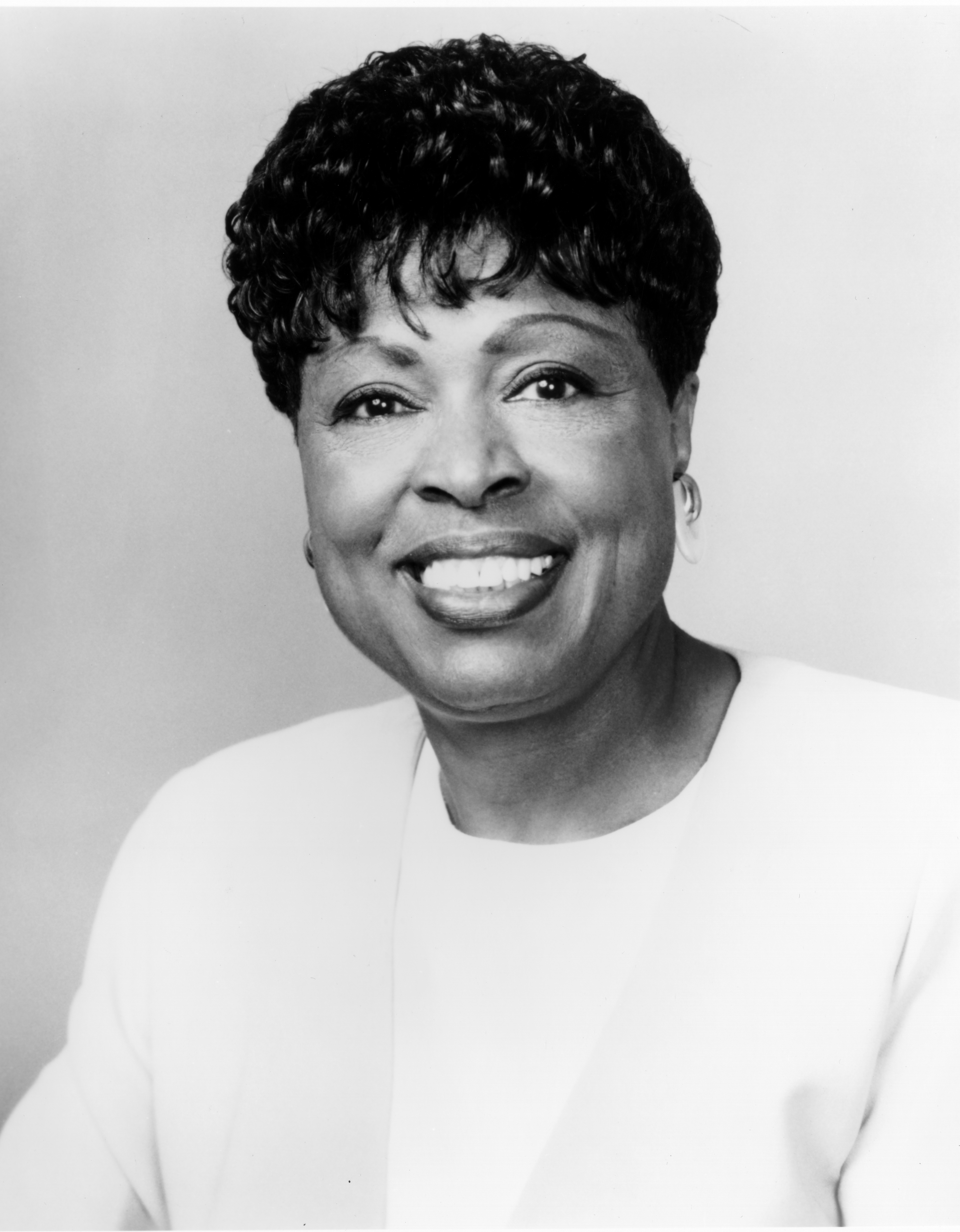
Watson as a State Senator in 1979.

Watson was elected to the California State Senate from 1978 to 1998. The longtime chair of the Health and Human Services Committee, she gained a reputation as an advocate for health care for the poor and children. She was the first African American woman in the California State Senate. Term limited, she was replaced by Kevin Murray.

When, in 1988, the US government proposed the addition of the category of "bi-racial" or "multiracial" to official documents and statistics, some African American organizations and African American leaders such as Watson and Representative Augustus Hawkins were particularly vocal in their rejection of and opposition to the category. They feared massive defection from the African American self-designation.

In 1992, Watson ran for the Los Angeles County Board of Supervisors. After a hard-fought campaign that often turned negative, Watson narrowly lost to former Supervisor Yvonne Burke, who was supported by U.S. Representative Maxine Waters.

In 1999, President Bill Clinton appointed her United States Ambassador to Micronesia and she served in the post for two years. She stepped down to run in the April 2001 Democratic primary election, which was called to nominate a candidate to replace Congressman Julian Dixon, who had died in office five months earlier. She won with 33 percent of the vote in a multi-candidate field, then carried the district with 75 percent of the vote in the June 2001 special election.

== U.S. House of Representatives ==
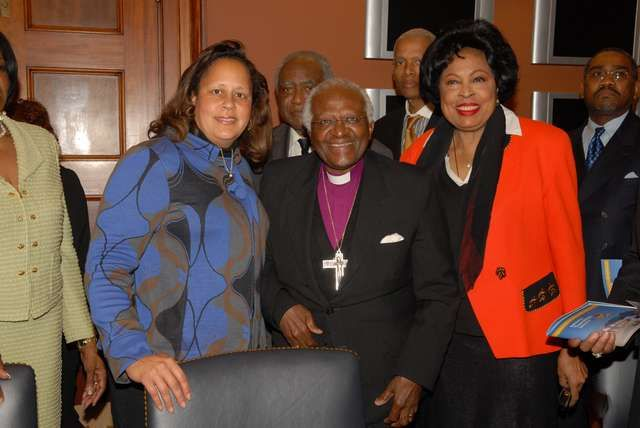
Watson (right) with U.S. Representative Laura Richardson and Desmond Tutu.

Racism

In Congress, she became a vocal leader on issues related to racism and xenophobia, supporting reparations for descendants of American slaves, reform of the educational system, subsidies for families lacking health care, and a comprehensive overhaul of the nation’s criminal justice system. She also decried incidents of violence and racism against Arab Americans that she believed were a result of retribution for the September 11, 2001, terrorist attacks.

Objection to 2004 Presidential Election results

She was one of 31 House Democrats who voted not to count the 20 electoral votes from Ohio in the 2004 United States presidential election. President George Bush won the state by 118,457 votes. Without Ohio's electoral votes, the election would have been decided by the U.S. House of Representatives, with each state having one vote in accordance with the Twelfth Amendment to the United States Constitution.

Opposition to policies of President George W. Bush

Congresswoman Watson supported withdrawal of U.S. troops from Iraq, opposed media consolidation, supported expanding welfare coverage, and opposed President Bush's proposal to privatize Social Security. Watson opposed the Bush tax cuts, saying they were unaffordable.

Cherokee Nation

On the issue of Cherokee Freedmen citizenship in the Cherokee Nation, Watson noted that 20,000 Cherokee lived in California. She opposed the Cherokee Nation's March 2007 vote to amend its constitution to limit citizenship to only those descendants with at least one Indian ancestor on the Dawes Roll. She noted that when freedmen were granted citizenship in the tribe in 1866 by a treaty which the Cherokee Nation made with the US government, it was without restriction to those freedmen with Indian ancestry. Appeals to the Cherokee Nation's position were pending, in part because the tribe excluded descendants of Cherokee freedmen and intermarried whites from voting on the amendment. In June 2007 Watson introduced a bill to sever US relations with the tribe and revoke its gaming privileges unless the Cherokee Nation restored citizenship in the tribe to descendants of Cherokee freedmen. This drew the ire of several tribal leaders and individuals in Indian Country, accusing her of undermining Native American tribal sovereignty.

Other issues

In 2006, the National Journal ranked Watson as the most liberal member of Congress.

Throughout her career in Congress, she advocated for increased funding and research directed at the HIV/AIDS pandemic. She argued in favor of humanitarian assistance for African nations that had been decimated by the disease.

=== Committee assignments ===
- Committee on Foreign Affairs
  - Subcommittee on Africa and Global Health
  - Subcommittee on Asia, the Pacific, and the Global Environment
  - Subcommittee on Terrorism, Nonproliferation, and Trade
- Committee on Oversight and Government Reform
  - Subcommittee on Domestic Policy
  - Subcommittee on Government Management, Organization, and Procurement (Chairwoman)
  - Subcommittee on Information Policy, Census, and National Archives

=== Caucuses ===
- Chair of the Congressional Entertainment Industries Caucus
- Co-chair of the Congressional Korea Caucus
- Co-chair of the U.S.-UK Caucus
- Congressional Black Caucus

== Political campaigns ==
In the 2008 Democratic primary, Watson's district went overwhelmingly for Illinois Senator Barack Obama by a margin of 61-29. As a superdelegate, Watson continued to support New York Senator Hillary Clinton.

Watson defeated her challengers in the California June 3 primary, and defeated Republican David Crowley in the November 4, 2008, election.

== Electoral history ==
2001 California's 32nd congressional district special election
Party	Candidate	Votes	%
Democratic	Diane Watson	75,584	71.4
Republican	Noel Irwin Hentschel	20,088	19.0
Green	Donna J. Warren	3,792	3.6
Reform	Ezola B. Foster	1,557	1.5
Invalid or blank votes		4,575	4.5
Total votes		105,596	100.0
Turnout			37.6
Democratic hold			

2002 United States House of Representatives elections in California
Party	Candidate	Votes	%
Democratic	Diane Watson (Incumbent)	97,779	82.6
Republican	Andrew Kim	16,699	14.1
Libertarian	Charles Tate	3,971	3.3
Total votes		118,449	100.0
Democratic hold			

2004 United States House of Representatives elections in California
Party	Candidate	Votes	%
Democratic	Diane Watson (Incumbent)	166,801	88.6
Libertarian	Robert G. Weber Jr.	21,513	11.4
Total votes		188,314	100.0
Democratic hold			

2006 United States House of Representatives elections in California
Party	Candidate	Votes	%
Democratic	Diane Watson (Incumbent)	113,715	100.0
Democratic hold			

2008 United States House of Representatives elections in California
Party	Candidate	Votes	%
Democratic	Diane Watson (Incumbent)	186,924	87.6
Republican	David Crowley	26,536	12.4
Total votes		213,460	100.0
Turnout			70.2
Democratic hold			

== See also ==
- List of African-American United States representatives
- Women in the United States House of Representatives

Diplomatic posts
Preceded by Cheryl Martin; Acting	United States Ambassador to Micronesia; 1999–2002	Succeeded by Larry Miles Dinger
U.S. House of Representatives
Preceded by Julian C. Dixon	Member of the U.S. House of Representatives from California's 32nd congressional district 2001–2003	Succeeded by Hilda Solis
Preceded by Lucille Roybal-Allard	Member of the U.S. House of Representatives from California's 33rd congressional district 2003–2011	Succeeded by Karen Bass
U.S. order of precedence (ceremonial)
Preceded by Tom Campbell as Former U.S. Representative	Order of precedence of the United States as Former U.S. Representative	Succeeded by John Campbell as Former U.S. Representative
