= Kevin Murray (politician) =

American lawyer and politician (1960–2026)

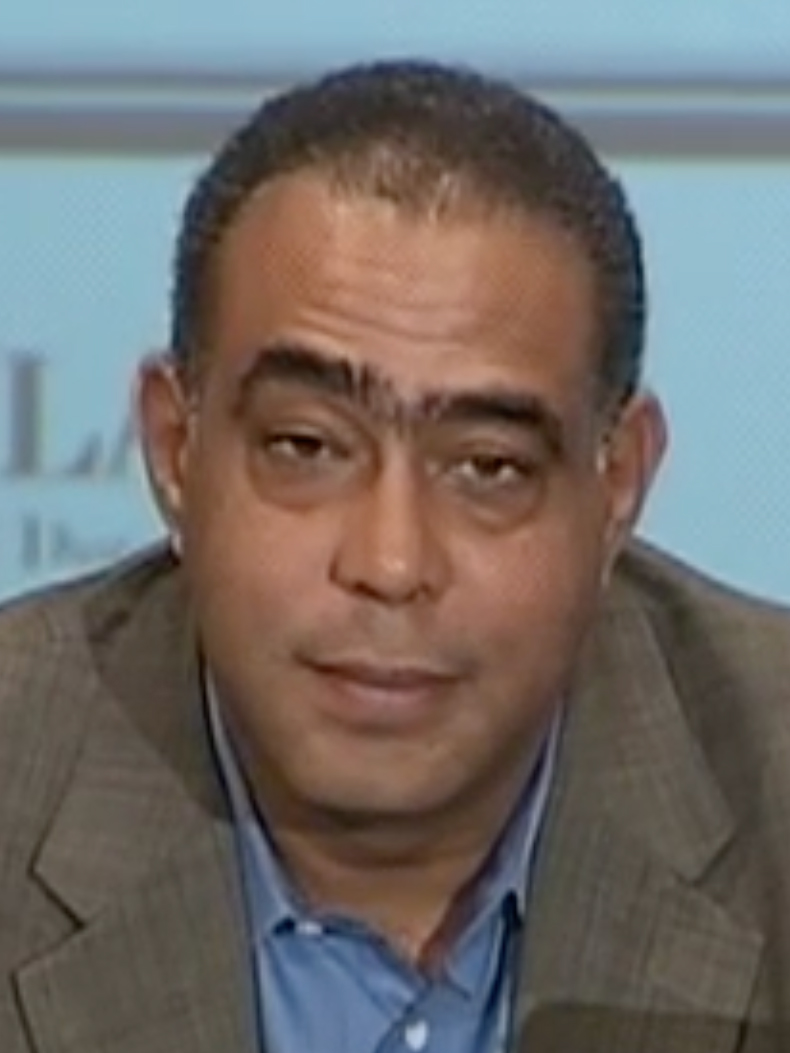
- Murray in 2010

Member of the California Senate from the 26th district
- In office December 7, 1998 – November 30, 2006
- Preceded by: Diane Watson
- Succeeded by: Mark Ridley-Thomas

Member of the California State Assembly from the 47th district
- In office December 5, 1994 – November 30, 1998
- Preceded by: Gwen Moore
- Succeeded by: Herb Wesson

Personal details
- Born: March 12, 1960 Los Angeles, California, U.S.
- Died: November 10, 2026 (aged 66) Los Angeles, California, U.S.
- Party: Democratic
- Spouse: Janice
- Children: 2
- Parent(s): Willard H. Murray Jr. (father); Barbara Farris (mother)
- Education: California State University, Northridge(BBA); Loyola Marymount University(MBA); Loyola Marymount University(JD)

Kevin Girard Murray (March 12, 1960 – November 10, 2026) was an American lawyer and politician. He was the first California Assemblyman to serve alongside his father, who was Willard H. Murray Jr.

== Education ==
Murray attended California State University, Northridge, earning a BSBA. Murray earned an MBA from Loyola Marymount University in 1983, and a JD from Loyola Law School in 1987.

== Law career ==
Prior to his election to the assembly, Murray practiced law in the areas of entertainment, real estate, insurance, and dependency. He also provided consulting and management services to artists in the entertainment industry.

== California State Assembly ==
Murray was an assemblyman in the California State Assembly from 1994 to 1998. He represented the 47th district, which covers an area of Los Angeles. Murray was a Democrat, and he served as Chair of the Transportation Committee.

== California State Senate ==
Murray was a senator in the California State Senate, representing the 26th district based in Culver City, California. He was also chair of the Appropriations Committee, the Transportation Committee, the Democratic Caucus, and the California Legislative Black Caucus. Murray also served on the California Film Commission. He retired due to term limits in 2006.

In the early 2000s, Senator Murray was vigorous in his advocacy on behalf of creative workers in the entertainment industry. He convened hearings in 2001 and 2002 on contracting and accounting practices in the recording industry and sponsored two bills aimed to improve the legal standing of recording artists with respect to the duration of their contracts and their ability to conduct royalty audits of their record companies. These measures were strongly opposed by the RIAA; the contract oriented bill (SB 1246, which would have amended the CA Labor Code) failed to pass, but the audit bill (SB 1034) was passed. [citations forthcoming]

== Premier Power Renewable Energy ==
On December 4, 2008, Premier Power Renewable Energy announced that Kevin Murray has been elected to Premier Power's board of directors.

== Death ==
Murray died in Los Angeles on November 10, 2026, at the age of 66.

California Assembly
| Preceded by Gwen Moore | 47th District; December 5, 1994 – November 30, 1998 | Succeeded by Herb Wesson |
California Senate
| Preceded by Diane Watson | 26th District; December 7, 1998 – November 30, 2006 | Succeeded by Mark Ridley-Thomas |
