= Ezola Foster =

American politician, activist, and writer (1938-2018)

- Foster in 2000
- Born: August 9, 1938; Maurice, Louisiana, U.S.
- Died: May 22, 2018 (aged 79); Boulder City, Nevada, U.S.
- Education: Texas Southern University (BA); Pepperdine University
- Political party: Constitution (2002–2018)
- Other political affiliations: Democratic (before 1984); Republican (1984–2000); Reform (2000–2002)

Ezola Broussard Foster (August 9, 1938 – May 22, 2018) was an American conservative political activist, writer, and politician. She was president of the interest group Black Americans for Family Values, author of the book What's Right for All Americans, and the Reform Party candidate for vice president in the 2000 U.S. presidential election with presidential nominee Pat Buchanan. In April 2002, Foster left the Reform Party for the Constitution Party.

== Early life and career ==
Foster was born in 1938 and reared in Maurice in Vermilion Parish in southwestern Louisiana. In 1960, she graduated with a BA in Business Education from Texas Southern University. She would go on to earn, in 1973, a Master's in School Management and Administration from Pepperdine University. In 1960, she moved to Los Angeles, California, where she was employed as a public high school teacher for thirty-three years—teaching typing, business courses, and sometimes English classes.

== Political career ==
=== Early activism ===
Foster first ran for office in 1986, securing the Republican nomination for the California Assembly's 48th district. In the general election, she faced incumbent assemblywoman Maxine Waters; a third candidate, Libertarian José "Joe" Castañeda, was also in the race. In the three-person race, Foster placed second, securing 12.77% of the vote but losing to Waters by 72 percentage points. In 1992, she was a staunch defender of the police officers in the Rodney King beating case and organized a testimonial dinner for Laurence Powell, one of the convicted officers, in 1995.

In 1994, while teaching at Bell High School in Bell, California, Foster was a public advocate of Proposition 187, a California ballot initiative to deny government programs of social services, health care, and public education to illegal immigrants. Her position was extremely unpopular at the school where she taught, which was 90% Hispanic. In 1996, she appeared on PBS's MacNeil/Lehrer NewsHour to promote her political book, What's Right for All Americans. During her appearance, she argued that illegal immigration was responsible for the low quality of Los Angeles schools; some of her colleagues at the school condemned her in an open letter. Two days later, she spoke an anti-immigration rally funded by Voice of Citizens Together. A group of students from her school threw frozen cans of soda at her, following which a fight broke out. Shortly thereafter, she left her job, which she calls a necessity resulting from her treatment at work. She subsequently went on speaking tours for the John Birch Society and took workers' compensation for an undisclosed mental disorder—which she described as "stress" and "anxiety"—until her official retirement as a teacher in 1998.

Foster appeared on Larry King Live, CBS This Morning, CNN & CO., Nightline, NewsTalk Television, CNN Live, MSNBC, Politically Incorrect, and various CBS, NBC, and ABC newscasts.

=== 2000 election ===
Pat Buchanan, noting Foster's conservative media credentials and public speaking ability, asked her to be his running mate after Jim Traficant of Ohio, Teamsters Union president James P. Hoffa, and others declined his request. His critics claimed Foster, who had never held political office, was chosen because she was African American; they likened it to affirmative action, a diversity-increasing policy that Buchanan had always opposed.

Foster, who supported Buchanan's campaigns in 1992 and 1996, quit her speaking tour to join the race. While Buchanan was hospitalized during part of the campaign, Foster was the face of the campaign, making television and radio appearances. She is the first African American and second woman (after Geraldine Ferraro) to be nominated for vice president by a party that was recognized and funded by the Federal Election Commission. During the campaign, Foster was the source of some controversy, drawing criticism for her membership in the John Birch Society and for her alleged mental illness which kept her from teaching.

=== Congressional run ===
Foster ran for Congress in the June 5, 2001, special election in California's 32nd district to replace deceased representative Julian Dixon as the Reform Party candidate and garnered 1.5% of the vote.

== Personal life ==
Foster was Catholic. Her first marriage ended in annulment, she said, when she found out that her husband was a convicted felon. In 1977 she married Chuck Foster, a truck driver.

== Electoral history ==
1986 California State Assembly 48th district election
Party	Candidate	Votes	%
Democratic	Maxine Waters	42,706	84.54%
Republican	Ezola Foster	6,450	12.77%
Libertarian	José "Joe" Castañeda	1,360	2.69%
Total votes		50,516	100.00%

2001 United States House of Representatives 32nd district special primary election
Party	Candidate	Votes	%
Reform	Ezola Foster	514	100%
Total votes		514	100.00%

2001 United States House of Representatives 32nd district special general election
Party	Candidate	Votes	%
Democratic	Diane Watson	75,584	74.82%
Republican	Noel Irwin Hentschel	20,088	19.88%
Green	Donna Warren	3,792	3.75%
Reform	Ezola Foster	1,557	1.54%
Total votes		101,021	100.00%

== Published works ==
- Foster, Ezola (1995). What's Right for All Americans. Waco, Texas: Wrs Publications. ISBN 978-1-56796-058-7.

== See also ==
- Black conservatism in the United States

Party political offices
Preceded by Pat Choate	Reform nominee for Vice President of the United States; 2000	Succeeded by Peter Camejo
