= 1978 United States House of Representatives elections in California =

- November 7, 1978

All 43 California seats to the United States House of Representatives
	Majority party	Minority party
Party	Democratic	Republican
Last election	29	14
Seats won	26	17
Seat change	▼3	▲3
Popular vote	3,335,332	3,105,933
Percentage	51.11%	47.60%
- Republican gain Democratic hold Republican hold

The United States House of Representatives elections in California, 1978 was an election for California's delegation to the United States House of Representatives, which occurred as part of the general election of the House of Representatives on November 7, 1978. Republicans knocked off three Democratic incumbents. 11th district Congressman Leo Ryan was re-elected, but was murdered while investigating the Peoples Temple in Guyana following the election.

== Overview ==
United States House of Representatives elections in California, 1978
Party	Votes	%	Before	After	+/–
Democratic	3,335,332	51.11%	29	26	-3
Republican	3,105,933	47.60%	14	17	+3
American Independent	45,359	0.70%	0	0	0
Peace and Freedom	39,017	0.60%	0	0	0
Totals	6,525,641	100.00%	43	43	—

== Results ==
Final results from the Clerk of the House of Representatives:

=== District 1 ===
California's 1st congressional district election, 1978
Party	Candidate	Votes	%
Democratic	Harold T. Johnson (incumbent)	125,122	59.35
Republican	James E. Taylor	85,690	40.65
Total votes		210,812	100.00
Turnout			
Democratic hold			

=== District 2 ===
California's 2nd congressional district election, 1978
Party	Candidate	Votes	%
Republican	Don H. Clausen (incumbent)	114,451	51.96
Democratic	Norma Bork	99,712	45.27
Peace and Freedom	Irv Sutley	6,097	2.77
Total votes		220,260	100.00
Turnout			
Republican hold			

=== District 3 ===
California's 3rd congressional district election, 1978
Party	Candidate	Votes	%
Democratic	Bob Matsui	105,537	53.44
Republican	Sandy Smoley	91,966	46.56
Total votes		197,503	100.00
Turnout			
Democratic hold			

=== District 4 ===
California's 4th congressional district election, 1978
Party	Candidate	Votes	%
Democratic	Vic Fazio	87,764	55.37
Republican	Rex Hime	70,733	44.63
Total votes		158,497	100.00
Turnout			
Democratic hold			

=== District 5 ===
California's 5th congressional district election, 1978
Party	Candidate	Votes	%
Democratic	John L. Burton (incumbent)	106,046	66.84
Republican	Dolores Skore	52,603	33.16
Total votes		158,649	100.00
Turnout			
Democratic hold			

=== District 6 ===
California's 6th congressional district election, 1978
Party	Candidate	Votes	%
Democratic	Phillip Burton (incumbent)	81,801	68.30
Republican	Tom Spinosa	33,515	27.98
American Independent	Raymond O. Heaps	4,452	3.72
Total votes		119,768	100.00
Turnout			
Democratic hold			

=== District 7 ===
California's 7th congressional district election, 1978
Party	Candidate	Votes	%
Democratic	George Miller (incumbent)	109,676	63.45
Republican	Paula Gordon	58,332	33.74
American Independent	Melvin E. Stanley	4,857	2.81
Total votes		172,865	100.00
Turnout			
Democratic hold			

=== District 8 ===
California's 8th congressional district election, 1978
Party	Candidate	Votes	%
Democratic	Ron Dellums (incumbent)	94,824	57.36
Republican	Charles V. Hughes	70,481	42.64
Total votes		165,305	100.00
Turnout			
Democratic hold			

=== District 9 ===
California's 9th congressional district election, 1978
Party	Candidate	Votes	%
Democratic	Pete Stark (incumbent)	88,179	65.38
Republican	Robert S. Allen	41,138	30.50
Peace and Freedom	Lawrance J. Phillips	5,562	4.12
Total votes		134,879	100.00
Turnout			
Democratic hold			

=== District 10 ===
California's 10th congressional district election, 1978
Party	Candidate	Votes	%
Democratic	Don Edwards (incumbent)	84,488	67.13
Republican	Rudy Hansen	41,374	32.87
Total votes		125,862	100.00
Turnout			
Democratic hold			

=== District 11 ===
California's 11th congressional district election, 1978
Party	Candidate	Votes	%
Democratic	Leo Ryan (incumbent)	92,882	60.52
Republican	Dave Welch	54,621	35.59
American Independent	Nicholas Waeil Kudrovzeff	5,961	3.88
Total votes		153,464	100.00
Turnout			
Democratic hold			

=== District 12 ===
California's 12th congressional district election, 1978
Party	Candidate	Votes	%
Republican	Pete McCloskey (incumbent)	116,982	73.07
Democratic	Kirsten Olsen	34,472	21.53
American Independent	Harold R. Boylan	5,609	3.50
Peace and Freedom	Adele Fumino	3,022	1.89
Total votes		160,085	100.00
Turnout			
Republican hold			

=== District 13 ===
California's 13th congressional district election, 1978
Party	Candidate	Votes	%
Democratic	Norman Mineta (incumbent)	100,809	57.49
Republican	Dan O'Keefe	69,306	39.52
Peace and Freedom	Robert Goldsborough III	5,246	2.99
Total votes		175,361	100.00
Turnout			
Democratic hold			

=== District 14 ===
California's 14th congressional district election, 1978
Party	Candidate	Votes	%
Republican	Norman D. Shumway	95,962	53.39
Democratic	John J. McFall (incumbent)	76,602	42.62
American Independent	George Darold Waldron	7,163	3.99
Total votes		179,727	100.00
Turnout			
Republican gain from Democratic			

=== District 15 ===
California's 15th congressional district election, 1978
Party	Candidate	Votes	%
Democratic	Tony Coelho	75,212	60.11
Republican	Chris Patterakis	49,914	39.89
Total votes		125,126	100.00
Turnout			
Democratic hold			

=== District 16 ===
California's 16th congressional district election, 1978
Party	Candidate	Votes	%
Democratic	Leon Panetta (incumbent)	104,550	61.37
Republican	Eric Seastrand	65,808	38.63
Total votes		170,358	100.00
Turnout			
Democratic hold			

=== District 17 ===
California's 17th congressional district election, 1978
Party	Candidate	Votes	%
Republican	Charles (Chip) Pashayan	81,296	54.49
Democratic	John Hans Krebs (incumbent)	67,885	45.51
Total votes		149,181	100.00
Turnout			
Republican gain from Democratic			

=== District 18 ===
California's 18th congressional district election, 1978
Party	Candidate	Votes	%
Republican	Bill Thomas	85,663	59.26
Democratic	Bob Sogge	58,900	40.74
Total votes		144,563	100.00
Turnout			
Republican hold			

=== District 19 ===
California's 19th congressional district election, 1978
Party	Candidate	Votes	%
Republican	Robert J. Lagomarsino (incumbent)	123,192	71.73
Democratic	Jerry Zamos	41,672	24.26
Peace and Freedom	Milton Shiro Takei	6,887	4.01
Total votes		171,751	100.00
Turnout			
Republican hold			

=== District 20 ===
California's 20th congressional district election, 1978
Party	Candidate	Votes	%
Republican	Barry Goldwater, Jr. (incumbent)	129,714	66.38
Democratic	Pat Lear	65,695	33.62
Total votes		195,409	100.00
Turnout			
Republican hold			

=== District 21 ===
California's 21st congressional district election, 1978
Party	Candidate	Votes	%
Democratic	James C. Corman (incumbent)	73,869	59.51
Republican	Rod Walsh	44,519	35.86
Peace and Freedom	Bill Hill	5,750	4.63
Total votes		124,138	100.00
Turnout			
Democratic hold			

=== District 22 ===
California's 22nd congressional district election, 1978
Party	Candidate	Votes	%
Republican	Carlos J. Moorhead (incumbent)	99,502	64.64
Democratic	Robert S. Henry	54,442	35.36
Total votes		153,944	100.00
Turnout			
Republican hold			

=== District 23 ===
California's 23rd congressional district election, 1978
Party	Candidate	Votes	%
Democratic	Anthony C. Beilenson (incumbent)	117,498	65.64
Republican	Joseph Barbara	61,496	34.36
Total votes		178,994	100.00
Turnout			
Democratic hold			

=== District 24 ===
California's 24th congressional district election, 1978
Party	Candidate	Votes	%
Democratic	Henry Waxman (incumbent)	85,075	62.66
Republican	Howard G. Schaefer	44,243	32.59
Peace and Freedom	Kevin Casey Peters	6,453	4.75
Total votes		135,771	100.00
Turnout			
Democratic hold			

=== District 25 ===
California's 25th congressional district election, 1978
Party	Candidate	Votes	%
Democratic	Edward R. Roybal (incumbent)	45,881	67.39
Republican	Robert K. Watson	22,205	32.61
Total votes		68,086	100.00
Turnout			
Democratic hold			

=== District 26 ===
California's 26th congressional district election, 1978
Party	Candidate	Votes	%
Republican	John H. Rousselot (incumbent)	113,059	100.00
Turnout			
Republican hold			

=== District 27 ===
California's 27th congressional district election, 1978
Party	Candidate	Votes	%
Republican	Bob Dornan (incumbent)	89,392	51.00
Democratic	Carey Peck	85,880	49.00
Total votes		175,272	100.00
Turnout			
Republican hold			

=== District 28 ===
California's 28th congressional district election, 1978
Party	Candidate	Votes	%
Democratic	Julian C. Dixon	97,592	100.00
Turnout			
Democratic hold			

=== District 29 ===
California's 29th congressional district election, 1978
Party	Candidate	Votes	%
Democratic	Augustus F. Hawkins (incumbent)	65,214	85.00
Republican	Uriah J. Fields	11,512	15.00
Total votes		76,726	100.00
Turnout			
Democratic hold			

=== District 30 ===
California's 30th congressional district election, 1978
Party	Candidate	Votes	%
Democratic	George E. Danielson (incumbent)	66,241	71.42
Republican	Henry Ares	26,511	28.58
Total votes		92,752	100.00
Turnout			
Democratic hold			

=== District 31 ===
California's 31st congressional district election, 1978
Party	Candidate	Votes	%
Democratic	Charles H. Wilson (incumbent)	55,667	67.76
Republican	Don Grimshaw	26,490	32.24
Total votes		82,157	100.00
Turnout			
Democratic hold			

=== District 32 ===
California's 32nd congressional district election, 1978
Party	Candidate	Votes	%
Democratic	Glenn M. Anderson (incumbent)	74,004	71.43
Republican	Sonya Mathison	23,242	22.43
American Independent	Ida Bader	6,363	6.14
Total votes		103,609	100.00
Turnout			
Democratic hold			

=== District 33 ===
California's 33rd congressional district election, 1978
Party	Candidate	Votes	%
Republican	Wayne Grisham	79,533	55.98
Democratic	Dennis S. Kazarian	62,540	44.02
Total votes		142,073	100.00
Turnout			
Republican hold			

=== District 34 ===
California's 34th congressional district election, 1978
Party	Candidate	Votes	%
Republican	Dan Lungren	90,554	53.72
Democratic	Mark Hannaford (incumbent)	73,608	43.67
American Independent	Lawrence John Stafford	4,410	2.62
Total votes		168,572	100.00
Turnout			
Republican gain from Democratic			

=== District 35 ===
California's 35th congressional district election, 1978
Party	Candidate	Votes	%
Democratic	Jim Lloyd (incumbent)	80,388	54.01
Republican	David Dreier	68,442	45.99
Total votes		148,830	100.00
Turnout			
Democratic hold			

=== District 36 ===
California's 36th congressional district election, 1978
Party	Candidate	Votes	%
Democratic	George Brown, Jr. (incumbent)	80,448	62.92
Republican	Dana Warren Carmody	47,417	37.08
Total votes		127,865	100.00
Turnout			
Democratic hold			

=== District 37 ===
California's 37th congressional district election, 1978
Party	Candidate	Votes	%
Republican	Jerry Lewis	106,581	61.40
Democratic	Dan Corcoran	60,463	34.83
American Independent	Bernard Wahl	6,544	3.77
Total votes		173,588	100.00
Turnout			
Republican hold			

=== District 38 ===
California's 38th congressional district election, 1978
Party	Candidate	Votes	%
Democratic	Jerry M. Patterson (incumbent)	75,471	58.61
Republican	Dan Goedeke	53,298	41.39
Total votes		128,769	100.00
Turnout			
Democratic hold			

=== District 39 ===
California's 39th congressional district election, 1978
Party	Candidate	Votes	%
Republican	William E. Dannemeyer	112,160	63.71
Democratic	William E. Farris	63,891	36.29
Total votes		176,051	100.00
Turnout			
Republican hold			

=== District 40 ===
California's 40th congressional district election, 1978
Party	Candidate	Votes	%
Republican	Robert Badham (incumbent)	147,882	65.95
Democratic	Jim McGuy	76,358	34.05
Total votes		224,240	100.00
Turnout			
Republican hold			

=== District 41 ===
California's 41st congressional district election, 1978
Party	Candidate	Votes	%
Republican	Bob Wilson (incumbent)	107,685	58.14
Democratic	King Golden, Jr.	77,540	41.86
Total votes		185,225	100.00
Turnout			
Republican hold			

=== District 42 ===
California's 42nd congressional district election, 1978
Party	Candidate	Votes	%
Democratic	Lionel Van Deerlin (incumbent)	85,126	73.74
Republican	Lawrence C. Mattera	30,319	26.26
Total votes		115,445	100.00
Turnout			
Democratic hold			

=== District 43 ===
California's 43rd congressional district election, 1978
Party	Candidate	Votes	%
Republican	Clair Burgener (incumbent)	167,150	68.66
Democratic	Reuben B. Brooks	76,308	31.34
Total votes		243,458	100.00
Turnout			
Republican hold			

== See also ==
- 96th United States Congress
- Political party strength in California
- Political party strength in U.S. states
- 1978 United States House of Representatives elections
