= Julian Dixon =

American politician (1934–2000)

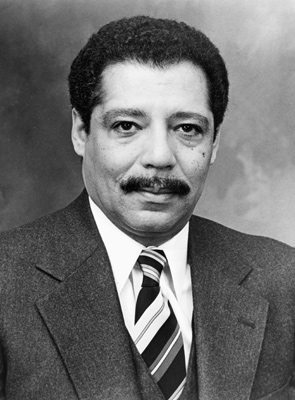

Chair of the House Ethics Committee
- In office January 3, 1985 – January 3, 1991
- Preceded by: Louis Stokes
- Succeeded by: Louis Stokes

Member of the U.S. House of Representatives from California
- In office January 3, 1979 – December 8, 2000
- Preceded by: Yvonne Brathwaite Burke
- Succeeded by: Diane Watson
- Constituency: 28th district (1979–1993); 32nd district (1993–2000)

Member of the California State Assembly
- In office January 8, 1973 – November 30, 1978
- Preceded by: Yvonne Brathwaite Burke
- Succeeded by: Gwen Moore
- Constituency: 63rd district (1973–1974); 49th district (1974–1978)

Personal details
- Born: Julian Carey Dixon; August 8, 1934 Washington, D.C., U.S.
- Died: December 8, 2000 (aged 66) Marina del Rey, California, U.S.
- Resting place: Inglewood Park Cemetery
- Party: Democratic
- Spouse: Bettye Lee
- Children: 1
- Education: California State University, Los Angeles (BS); Southwestern University (LLB)

Military service
- Allegiance: United States
- Branch/service: United States Army
- Years of service: 1957–1960
- Rank: Sergeant

Julian Carey Dixon (August 8, 1934 – December 8, 2000) was an American Democratic politician from California who was a member of the California State Assembly from 1973 to 1978 and then a member of the United States House of Representatives from 1979 until his death. He chaired the House Ethics Committee from 1985 to 1991. Since his death in 2000, he has been the last Black American man to represent the State of California in Congress.

== Biography ==
A member of the aristocratic Syphax family, Dixon was born in Washington D.C. and served in the United States Army from 1957 to 1960. He attended Dorsey High School, and graduated from California State University, Los Angeles in 1962.

He was elected to the California State Assembly as a Democrat in 1972, and served in that body for three terms.

=== Congress ===
Dixon was elected to the House of Representatives in 1978. In 1983 he joined with 7 other Congressional Representatives to sponsor a resolution to impeach Ronald Reagan over his sudden and unexpected invasion of Grenada. He chaired the rules committee at the 1984 Democratic National Convention and the ethics probe into Speaker Jim Wright. Dixon won re-election to the 107th United States Congress, but died at a hospital in Marina Del Rey, California on December 8, 2000, aged 66, following a heart attack.

=== Legacy ===
The busy 7th Street / Metro Center / Julian Dixon transfer station for the A Line, B Line, D Line, and E Line in downtown Los Angeles is named after Dixon, with a plaque commemorating his role in obtaining the federal funding that enabled construction of the Metro Rail system. His alma mater, Southwestern University School of Law, in 2004 opened the Julian C. Dixon Courtroom and Advocacy Center in the former Bullocks Wilshire building. The Culver City branch of the Los Angeles County Library is also named in his honor, Culver City Julian Dixon Library.

The third revised edition of Black Americans in Congress 1870-2007 (House Document 108-224, Serial Set v.14904) is dedicated to the memory of Dixon. Remarks requesting this were made by several of his colleagues March 21, 2001 on the House floor during consideration of House Concurrent Resolution 43 of the 107th Congress which ordered the printing of the revised edition.

Dixon was a member of Alpha Phi Alpha fraternity. He was interred at Inglewood Park Cemetery, Inglewood, California.

== Electoral history ==
Julian Dixon electoral history

1978 United States House of Representatives elections in California
Party	Candidate	Votes	%
Democratic	Julian C. Dixon	97,592	100.0
Democratic hold			

1980 United States House of Representatives elections in California
Party	Candidate	Votes	%
Democratic	Julian C. Dixon (Incumbent)	108,725	79.2
Republican	Robert Reid	23,179	16.9
Libertarian	Ernst F. Ghermann	5,400	3.9
Total votes		137,304	100.0
Democratic hold			

1982 United States House of Representatives elections in California
Party	Candidate	Votes	%
Democratic	Julian C. Dixon (Incumbent)	103,469	78.9
Republican	David Goerz	24,473	18.7
Libertarian	David W. Meleney	3,210	2.4
Total votes		131,152	100.0
Democratic hold			

1984 United States House of Representatives elections in California
Party	Candidate	Votes	%
Democratic	Julian C. Dixon (Incumbent)	113,076	75.6
Republican	Beatrice M. Jett	33,511	22.4
Libertarian	Don Swemgimurti Federick	2,930	2.0
Total votes		149,517	100.0
Democratic hold			

1986 United States House of Representatives elections in California
Party	Candidate	Votes	%
Democratic	Julian C. Dixon (Incumbent)	92,635	76.4
Republican	George Zaldivar Adams	25,858	21.3
Libertarian	Howard Johnson	2,837	2.3
Total votes		121,330	100.0
Democratic hold			

1988 United States House of Representatives elections in California
Party	Candidate	Votes	%
Democratic	Julian C. Dixon (Incumbent)	109,801	76.2
Republican	George Zaldivar Adams	28,645	19.8
Libertarian	Howard Johnson	3,080	2.1
Peace and Freedom	Salomea Honigsfeld	2,811	1.9
Total votes		144,337	100.0
Democratic hold			

1990 United States House of Representatives elections in California
Party	Candidate	Votes	%
Democratic	Julian C. Dixon (Incumbent)	69,482	72.8
Republican	George Zaldivar Adams	21,245	22.2
Peace and Freedom	William R. Williams II	2,723	2.8
Libertarian	Robert G. "Bob" Weber Jr.	2,150	2.2
Total votes		95,600	100.0
Democratic hold			

1992 United States House of Representatives elections in California
Party	Candidate	Votes	%
Democratic	Julian C. Dixon (Incumbent)	150,644	87.2
Libertarian	Robert G. "Bob" Weber Jr.	12,834	7.2
Peace and Freedom	William R. Williams II	9,782	5.6
Independent	Leanick-Beltran (write-in)	2	0.0
Total votes		173,262	100.0
Democratic hold			

1994 United States House of Representatives elections in California
Party	Candidate	Votes	%
Democratic	Julian C. Dixon (Incumbent)	98,017	77.6
Republican	Ernie A. Farhat	22,190	17.6
Peace and Freedom	John Honigsfeld	6,099	4.8
Total votes		126,306	100.0
Democratic hold			

1996 United States House of Representatives elections in California
Party	Candidate	Votes	%
Democratic	Julian C. Dixon (Incumbent)	124,712	82.4
Republican	Larry Ardito	18,768	12.4
Libertarian	Neal Donner	6,390	4.2
Natural Law	Rashied Jibri	1,557	1.0
Total votes		151,427	100.0
Democratic hold			

1998 United States House of Representatives elections in California
Party	Candidate	Votes	%
Democratic	Julian C. Dixon (Incumbent)	112,253	86.7
Republican	Laurence Ardito	14,622	11.3
Libertarian	Velko Milosevich	2,617	2.0
Total votes		129,492	100.0
Democratic hold			

2000 United States House of Representatives elections in California
Party	Candidate	Votes	%
Democratic	Julian C. Dixon (Incumbent)	137,447	83.6
Republican	Kathy Williamson	19,924	12.2
Libertarian	Bob Weber	3,875	2.3
Natural Law	Rashied Jibri	3,281	1.9
Total votes		164,527	100.0
Democratic hold			

== See also ==
- Hal Bernson, Los Angeles City Council member, 1979–2003, received first Julian C. Dixon Award for public service
- List of African-American United States representatives
- List of members of the United States Congress who died in office (2000–present)#2000s

U.S. House of Representatives
Preceded by Yvonne Brathwaite Burke	Member of the U.S. House of Representatives from California's 28th congressional district 1979–1993	Succeeded by David Dreier
Preceded by Glenn M. Anderson	Member of the U.S. House of Representatives from California's 32nd congressional district 1993–2000	Succeeded by Diane Watson
Preceded by Walter E. Fauntroy	Chair of the Congressional Black Caucus; 1983–1985	Succeeded by Mickey Leland
Preceded by Louis Stokes	Chair of the House Ethics Committee; 1985–1991	Succeeded by Louis Stokes
