= 1982 United States House of Representatives elections =

House elections for the 98th U.S. Congress

- November 2, 1982

All 435 seats in the United States House of Representatives 218 seats needed for a majority
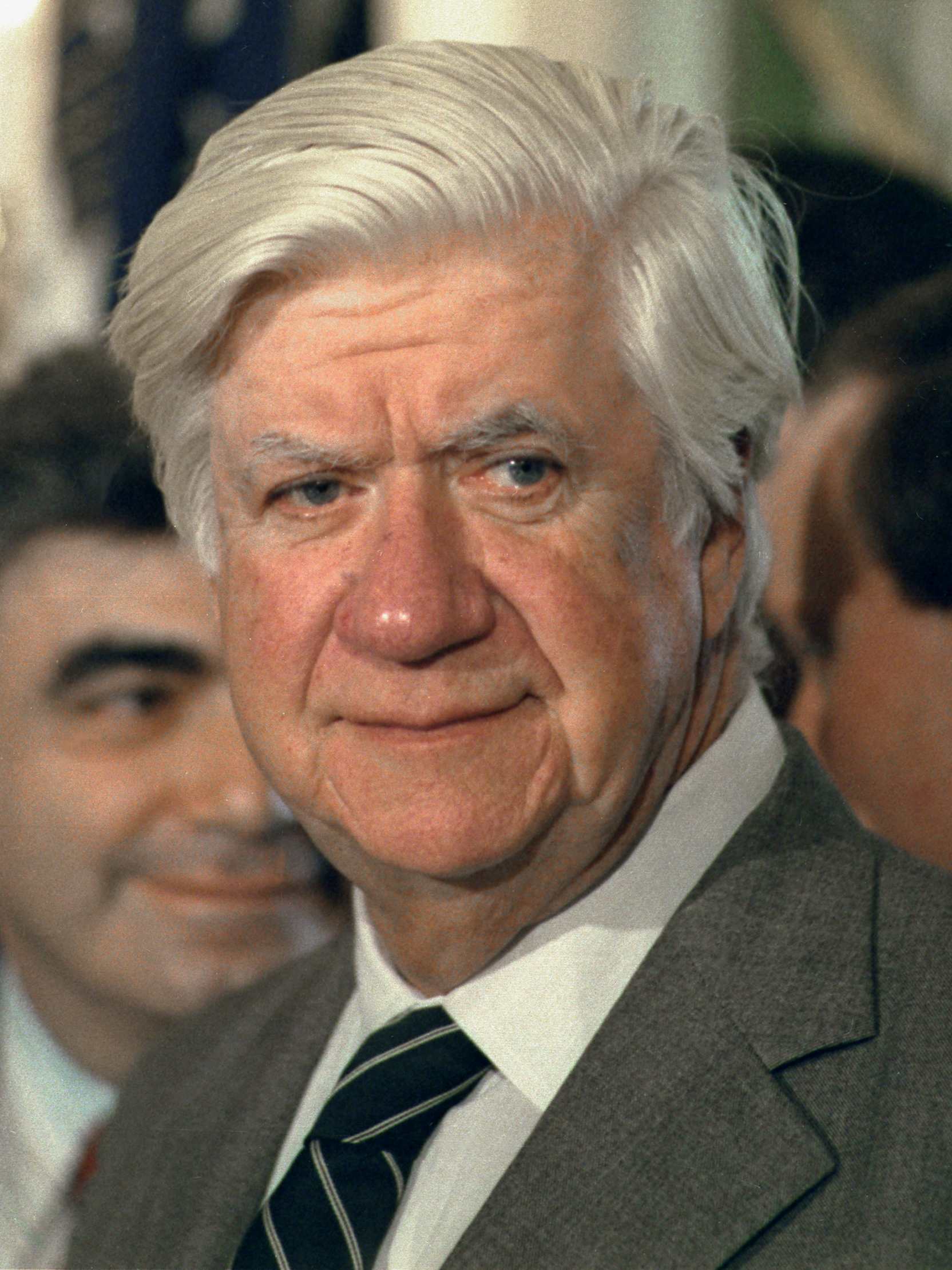

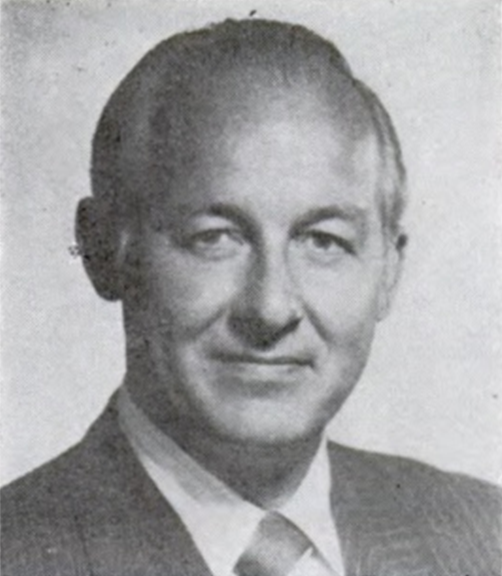
	Majority party	Minority party
Leader	Tip O'Neill	Bob Michel
Party	Democratic	Republican
Leader since	January 4, 1977	January 3, 1981
Leader's seat	Massachusetts 8th	Illinois 18th
Last election	243 seats	191 seats
Seats won	269	165
Seat change	▲26	▼26
Popular vote	35,284,473	27,625,593
Percentage	55.2%	43.4%
Swing	▲4.7pp	▼4.4pp
	Third party
Party	Conservative
Last election	1 (Note: The lone Conservative, William Carney of New York caucused with Republicans.)
Seats won	1
Seat change	Steady
Popular vote	140,404
Percentage	0.2%
Swing	▲0.1pp
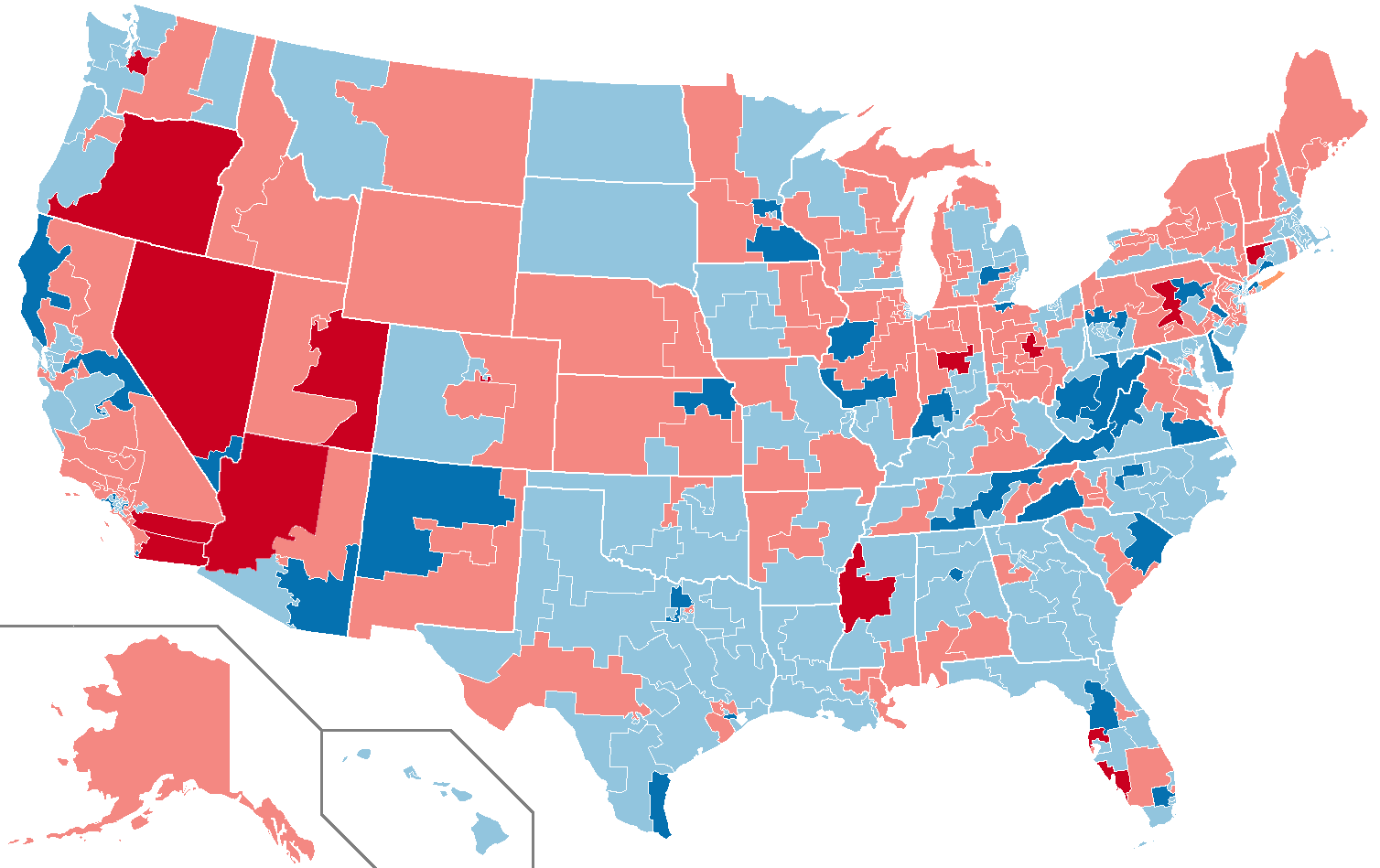
- Results: Democratic hold Democratic gain Republican hold Republican gain Conservative hold
Speaker before election
Tip O'Neill
Democratic
Elected Speaker
Tip O'Neill
Democratic

The 1982 United States House of Representatives elections was an election for the United States House of Representatives held on November 2, 1982, to elect members to serve in the 98th United States Congress. They occurred in the middle of President Ronald Reagan's first term, whose popularity was sinking due to economic conditions under the 1982 recession. The President's Republican Party lost seats in the House, which could be viewed as a response to the President's approval at the time. Unlike most midterm election cycles, the number of seats lost—26 seats to the Democratic Party—was a comparatively large swap. It included most of the seats that had been gained the previous election, cementing the Democratic majority. Coincidentally, the number of seats the Democrats picked up (26), was the exact amount the Republicans would have needed to win the House majority. It was the first election held after the 1980 United States redistricting cycle.

In the previous election of 1980 Republicans gained many seats as the result of President Ronald Reagan's coattails. In 1982, 14 freshman representatives who ran for re-election lost their seats.

To date, this election marks the last time the Democrats picked up a House seat in West Virginia. It was also the last time the party holding the White House won independent voters in a congressional midterm election until 2022.

== Overall results ==
393 incumbent members sought reelection, but 10 were defeated in primaries and 29 defeated in the general election for a total of 354 incumbents winning.

↓
269	1	165
Democratic	C	Republican

Parties	Seats				Popular vote		
Parties	1980	1982	+/-	Strength	Vote	%	Change
Democratic Party	243	269	▲26	61.8%	35,284,473	55.2%	▲4.7%
Republican Party	191	165	▼26	38.0%	27,625,593	43.4%	▼4.4%
Libertarian Party	0	0	Steady	0.0%	462,767	0.7%	Steady
Conservative Party	1	1	Steady	0.2%	140,404	0.2%	▲0.1%
Independent	0	0	Steady	0.0%	120,476	0.2%	▼0.1%
Right to Life Party	0	0	Steady	0.0%	45,819	0.1%	Steady
Milton Street Party	0	0	Steady	0.0%	35,205	0.1%	▲0.1%
Peace and Freedom Party	0	0	Steady	0.0%	34,422	0.1%	Steady
Others	0	0	Steady	0.0%	131,685	0.2%	Steady
Total	435	435	0	100.0%	63,880,844	100.0%	Steady
Source: Election Statistics – Office of the Clerk

Popular vote
Democratic	55.23%
Republican	43.37%
Libertarian	0.72%
Conservative	0.22%
Others	0.46%

House seats
Democratic	61.84%
Republican	37.93%
Conservative	0.23%

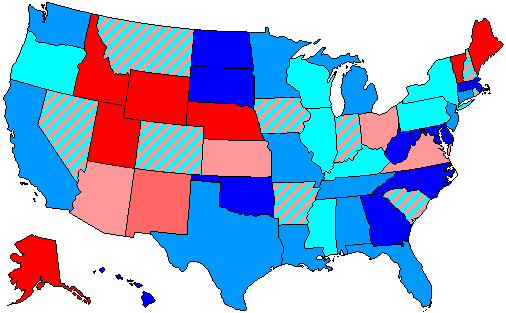
House seats by party holding plurality in state: 80+% Democratic / 80+% Republican; 60+ to 80% Democratic / 60+ to 80% Republican; Up to 60% Democratic / Up to 60% Republican

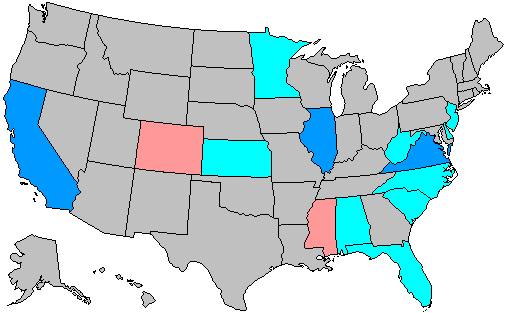
Change in seats: 6+ Democratic gain / 6+ Republican gain; 3–5 Democratic gain / 3–5 Republican gain; 1–2 Democratic gain / 1–2 Republican gain; no net change

== Retiring incumbents ==
40 representatives retired. 32 of those seats were held by the same party; 8 seats changed parties.

=== Democrats ===
19 Democrats retired. 12 of those seats were held by Democrats, 4 were won by Republicans, and 3 seats were eliminated in redistricting.

==== Democratic held ====
1. California 5: John L. Burton, was succeeded by Barbara Boxer (with district being renumbered as California 6).
2. Georgia 1: Ronald 'Bo' Ginn, to run for Governor of Georgia, was succeeded by Lindsay Thomas.
3. Georgia 3: Jack Brinkley, was succeeded by Richard Ray.
4. Michigan 17: William M. Brodhead, was succeeded by Sander Levin.
5. Missouri 5: Richard Bolling, was succeeded by Alan Wheat.
6. New York 12: Shirley Chisholm, was succeeded by Major Owens.
7. North Carolina 2: Lawrence H. Fountain, was succeeded by Tim Valentine.
8. South Carolina 5: Kenneth Lamar Holland, was succeeded by John Spratt.
9. Texas 5: Jim Mattox, to run for Attorney General of Texas, was succeeded by John Wiley Bryant.
10. Texas 16: Richard C. White, was succeeded by Ronald D. Coleman.
11. West Virginia 1: Bob Mollohan, was succeeded by Alan Mollohan.
12. Wisconsin 5: Henry Reuss, was succeeded by Jim Moody.

==== Republican gain ====
1. Connecticut 6: Toby Moffett, to run for U.S. senator, was succeeded by Nancy Johnson.
2. Mississippi 2: David R. Bowen, was succeeded by Webb Franklin.
3. Nevada at-large: James David Santini, to run for U.S. senator, was succeeded by Barbara Vucanovich (with district being renumbered as Nevada 2).
4. Pennsylvania 17: Allen E. Ertel, to run for Governor of Pennsylvania, was succeeded by George Gekas.

==== Seat eliminated in redistricting ====
1. Indiana 2: Floyd Fithian who ran for U.S. senator.
2. Michigan 18: James J. Blanchard who ran for Governor of Michigan.
3. New York 22: Jonathan Brewster Bingham.

=== Republicans ===
21 Republicans retired. 11 of those seats were held by Republicans, 4 were won by Democrats, and 6 seats were eliminated in redistricting.

==== Republican held ====
1. Arizona 1: John Jacob Rhodes, was succeeded by John McCain.
2. California 12: Pete McCloskey, to run for U.S. senator, was succeeded by Ed Zschau.
3. California 43: Clair Burgener, was succeeded by Ron Packard.
4. Florida 10: Louis A. Bafalis, to run for Governor of Florida, was succeeded by Tom Lewis (with district being renumbered as Florida 12).
5. Maine 1: David F. Emery, to run for U.S. senator, was succeeded by John R. McKernan Jr.
6. New York 31: Donald J. Mitchell, was succeeded by Sherwood Boehlert (with district being renumbered as New York 25).
7. Ohio 7: Bud Brown, to run for Governor of Ohio, was succeeded by Mike DeWine.
8. Pennsylvania 24: Marc L. Marks, was succeeded by Tom Ridge (with district being renumbered as Pennsylvania 21).
9. Tennessee 6: Robin Beard, to run for U.S. senator, was succeeded by Don Sundquist (with district being renumbered as Tennessee 7).
10. Texas 3: James M. Collins, to run for U.S. senator, was succeeded by Steve Bartlett.
11. Virginia 1: Paul S. Trible Jr., to run for U.S. senator, was succeeded by Herbert H. Bateman.

==== Democratic gain ====
1. California 27: Bob Dornan, to run for U.S. senator, was succeeded by Mel Levine.
2. Kansas 2: James Edmund Jeffries, was succeeded by Jim Slattery.
3. West Virginia 2: Cleve Benedict, to run for U.S. senator, was succeeded by Harley O. Staggers Jr.
4. Virginia 6: M. Caldwell Butler, was succeeded by Jim Olin.

==== Seat eliminated in redistricting ====
1. California 20: Barry Goldwater Jr., who ran for U.S. senator.
2. Illinois 13: Robert McClory.
3. New Jersey 5: Millicent Fenwick, who ran for U.S. senator.
4. New York 3: Gregory W. Carman.
5. Ohio 11: J. William Stanton.
6. Ohio 17: Jean Spencer Ashbrook.

== Defeated incumbents ==
As a result of redistricting, many incumbents were forced to compete against each other in the same district, which resulted in a larger number of incumbents being defeated in primaries.

=== In primary elections ===
10 representatives lost renomination: 6 lost in redistricting battles pitting incumbents against each other, and 4 lost nomination to non-incumbent challengers.

==== Democrats ====
6 Democrats lost renomination: 3 in redistricting races and 3 to a non-incumbent challenger. All the seats were held by Democrats.

1. Georgia 8: Billy Lee Evans lost to challenger J. Roy Rowland.
2. Illinois 5: John G. Fary lost to challenger Bill Lipinski.
3. Indiana 11: David W. Evans lost a redistricting race to fellow incumbent Andrew Jacobs Jr.
4. Ohio 19: Ronald M. Mottl lost to challenger Ed Feighan.
5. Pennsylvania 1: Joseph F. Smith lost a redistricting race to fellow incumbent Thomas M. Foglietta.
6. Pennsylvania 12: Donald A. Bailey lost a redistricting race to fellow incumbent John Murtha.

==== Republicans ====
4 Republicans lost renomination: 3 in redistricting races and 1 to a non-incumbent challenger.

===== Seat held by a Republican =====
These primary winners later won the general election.

1. California 33: Wayne R. Grisham lost a redistricting race to fellow incumbent David Dreier.
2. Illinois 4: Ed Derwinski lost a redistricting race to fellow incumbent George M. O'Brien.
3. New York 27: Gary A. Lee lost a redistricting race to fellow incumbent George C. Wortley.

===== Seat lost to a Democrat =====
1. Illinois 17: Tom Railsback lost to challenger Kenneth G. McMillan, who later lost the general election to Lane Evans.

=== In the general election ===
==== Democrats ====
Three incumbent Democrats lost re-election; two lost to Republican incumbents and one to a non-incumbent challenger.

===== Seat lost to a Republican incumbent =====
1. New York 14: Leo C. Zeferetti lost a redistricting race to Guy V. Molinari.
2. New York 22: Peter A. Peyser lost a redistricting race to Benjamin A. Gilman.

===== Seat lost to a Republican challenger =====
1. Ohio 12: Bob Shamansky lost to John Kasich.

==== Republicans ====
Twenty-six incumbent Republicans lost re-election; five lost to Democratic incumbents while twenty-one lost to non-incumbent challengers, ten of whom were first elected in 1980.

===== Seat lost to a Democratic incumbent =====
1. California 30: John H. Rousselot lost a redistricting race to Matthew G. Martinez.
2. Massachusetts 4: Margaret Heckler lost a redistricting race to Barney Frank.
3. Missouri 4: Wendell Bailey lost a redistricting race to Ike Skelton.
4. New York 3: John LeBoutillier lost a redistricting race to Robert J. Mrazek.
5. South Dakota at-large: Clint Roberts lost a redistricting race to Tom Daschle.

===== Seat lost to a Democratic challenger =====
1. Alabama 6: Albert L. Smith Jr. lost to Ben Erdreich.
2. California 1: Donald H. Clausen lost to Douglas H. Bosco.
3. Connecticut 3: Lawrence J. DeNardis lost to Bruce A. Morrison.
4. Delaware at-large: Tom Evans lost to Thomas R. Carper.
5. Illinois 20: Paul Findley lost to Dick Durbin.
6. Indiana 8: H. Joel Deckard lost to Frank McCloskey.
7. Michigan 6: James Whitney Dunn lost to Milton Robert Carr.
8. Minnesota 1: Tom Hagedorn lost to Tim Penny.
9. Minnesota 6: Arlen Erdahl lost to Gerry Sikorski.
10. New Jersey 9: Harold C. Hollenbeck lost to Robert Torricelli.
11. North Carolina 6: Walter E. Johnston, III lost to Charles Robin Britt.
12. North Carolina 11: Bill Hendon lost to James M. Clarke.
13. Ohio 9: Ed Weber lost to Marcy Kaptur.
14. Pennsylvania 3: Charles F. Dougherty lost to Robert A. Borski, Jr.
15. Pennsylvania 4: Eugene Atkinson lost to Joseph P. Kolter.
16. Pennsylvania 8: James K. Coyne, III lost to Peter H. Kostmayer.
17. Pennsylvania 11: James L. Nelligan lost to Frank Harrison.
18. South Carolina 6: John Light Napier lost to Robin Tallon.
19. Virginia 4: Robert Daniel lost to Norman Sisisky.
20. Virginia 9: William C. Wampler lost to Rick Boucher.
21. West Virginia 3: Mick Staton lost to Bob Wise.

== Special elections ==
District	Incumbent			This race	
District	Member	Party	First elected	Results	Candidates
Connecticut 1	William Cotter	Democratic	1970	Incumbent died September 8, 1981. New member elected January 11, 1982. Democratic hold. Winner was subsequently re-elected in November.	▌ ✓ Barbara Kennelly (Democratic) 58.8%; ▌Antonina P. Uccello (Republican) 41.2%
Ohio 17	John M. Ashbrook	Republican	1960	Incumbent died April 24, 1982. New member elected June 19, 1982. Republican hold. Winner did not seek re-election in November.	▌ ✓ Jean Spencer Ashbrook (Republican) 73.9%; ▌Jack Koelbl (Democratic) 26.1%
California 30	George Danielson	Democratic	1970	Incumbent resigned March 9, 1982 to become Associate Justice of the California Court of Appeals. New member elected July 13, 1982. Democratic hold. Winner was subsequently re-elected in November.	▌ ✓ Matthew G. Martinez (Democratic) 51%; ▌Ralph R. Ramirez (Republican) 49%
Indiana 1	Adam Benjamin Jr.	Democratic	1976	Incumbent died September 7, 1982. New member elected November 2, 1982. Democratic hold. Successor was also elected the same day to the next term; see below.	▌ ✓ Katie Hall (Democratic); [data missing]

== Alabama ==
District	Incumbent			This race	
District	Member	Party	First elected	Results	Candidates
Alabama 1	Jack Edwards	Republican	1964	Incumbent re-elected.	▌ ✓ Jack Edwards (Republican) 61.0%; ▌Steve Gudac (Democratic) 37.7%; ▌William Springer (Libertarian) 1.3%
Alabama 2	William Louis Dickinson	Republican	1964	Incumbent re-elected.	▌ ✓ William Louis Dickinson (Republican) 50.4%; ▌Billy Joe Camp (Democratic) 49.6%
Alabama 3	William Flynt Nichols	Democratic	1966	Incumbent re-elected.	▌ ✓ William Flynt Nichols (Democratic) 96.3%; ▌Richard David Landers (Libertarian) 3.7%
Alabama 4	Tom Bevill	Democratic	1966	Incumbent re-elected.	▌ ✓ Tom Bevill (Democratic) Uncontested
Alabama 5	Ronnie Flippo	Democratic	1976	Incumbent re-elected.	▌ ✓ Ronnie Flippo (Democratic) 80.7%; ▌Leo Yambrek (Republican) 18.2%; ▌Kenneth Ament (Libertarian) 1.1%
Alabama 6	Albert L. Smith Jr.	Republican	1980	Incumbent lost re-election. Democratic gain.	▌ ✓ Ben Erdreich (Democratic) 53.2%; ▌Albert L. Smith Jr. (Republican) 46.4%; ▌Charles Ewing (Libertarian) 0.4%
Alabama 7	Richard Shelby	Democratic	1978	Incumbent re-elected.	▌ ✓ Richard Shelby (Democratic) 96.8%; ▌James Jones (Libertarian) 3.2%

== Alaska ==
District	Incumbent			This race	
District	Member	Party	First elected	Results	Candidates
Alaska at-large	Don Young	Republican	1973 (special)	Incumbent re-elected.	▌ ✓ Don Young (Republican) 70.8%; ▌Dave Carlson (Democratic) 28.7%

== Arizona ==
Arizona received an additional seat at reapportionment and added a 5th district in the southeast of the state.

District	Incumbent			This race	
District	Member	Party	First elected	Results	Candidates
Arizona 1	John Jacob Rhodes	Republican	1952	Incumbent retired. Republican hold.	▌ ✓ John McCain (Republican) 65.9%; ▌Bill Hegarty (Democratic) 30.5%; ▌Richard K. Dodge (Libertarian) 3.6%
Arizona 2	Mo Udall	Democratic	1961 (special)	Incumbent re-elected.	▌ ✓ Mo Udall (Democratic) 70.9%; ▌Roy B. Laos (Republican) 27.4%; ▌Jessica Sampson (Socialist Labor) 1.7%
Arizona 3	Bob Stump	Democratic	1976	Incumbent re-elected as a Republican. Republican gain.	▌ ✓ Bob Stump (Republican) 63.3%; ▌Pat Bosch (Democratic) 36.7%
Arizona 4	Eldon Rudd	Republican	1976	Incumbent re-elected.	▌ ✓ Eldon Rudd (Republican) 65.7%; ▌Wayne O. Earley (Democratic) 30.4%; ▌Dick Stauffer (Libertarian) 3.9%
Arizona 5	None (district created)			New seat. Democratic gain.	▌ ✓ Jim McNulty (Democratic) 49.7%; ▌Jim Kolbe (Republican) 48.3%; ▌Richard D. Auster (Libertarian) 2.0%

== Arkansas ==
District	Incumbent			This race	
District	Member	Party	First elected	Results	Candidates
Arkansas 1	Bill Alexander	Democratic	1968	Incumbent re-elected.	▌ ✓ Bill Alexander (Democratic) 64.8%; ▌Chuck Banks (Republican) 35.2%
Arkansas 2	Ed Bethune	Republican	1978	Incumbent re-elected.	▌ ✓ Ed Bethune (Republican) 53.9%; ▌Charles L. George (Democratic) 46.1%
Arkansas 3	John Paul Hammerschmidt	Republican	1966	Incumbent re-elected.	▌ ✓ John Paul Hammerschmidt (Republican) 66.0%; ▌Jim McDougal (Democratic) 34.0%
Arkansas 4	Beryl Anthony Jr.	Democratic	1978	Incumbent re-elected.	▌ ✓ Beryl Anthony Jr. (Democratic) 65.6%; ▌Bob Leslie (Republican) 34.4%

== California ==
The delegation increased from 43 to 45 seats. To create the two-seat net gain, five seats with no incumbent were added.

District	Incumbent			This race	
District	Member	Party	First elected	Results	Candidates
California 1	Donald H. Clausen; Redistricted from the 2nd district	Republican	1963 (special)	Incumbent lost re-election. Democratic gain.	▌ ✓ Douglas H. Bosco (Democratic) 49.8%; ▌Donald H. Clausen (Republican) 47.2%; ▌David Redick (Libertarian) 2.9%
California 2	Eugene A. Chappie; Redistricted from the 1st district	Republican	1980	Incumbent re-elected.	▌ ✓ Eugene A. Chappie (Republican) 57.9%; ▌John Newmeyer (Democratic) 40.5%; ▌Howard Fegarsky (Peace and Freedom) 1.6%
California 3	Bob Matsui	Democratic	1978	Incumbent re-elected.	▌ ✓ Bob Matsui (Democratic) 89.6%; ▌Bruce A. Daniel (Libertarian) 7.5%; ▌John C. Reiger (Peace and Freedom) 2.9%
California 4	Vic Fazio	Democratic	1978	Incumbent re-elected.	▌ ✓ Vic Fazio (Democratic) 63.9%; ▌Roger B. Canfield (Republican) 36.1%
California 5	Phillip Burton; Redistricted from the 6th district	Democratic	1964	Incumbent re-elected.	▌ ✓ Phillip Burton (Democratic) 57.9%; ▌Milton Marks (Republican) 40.5%; ▌Justin Raimondo (Libertarian) 1.6%
California 6	John L. Burton; Redistricted from the 5th district	Democratic	1974	Incumbent retired. Democratic hold.	▌ ✓ Barbara Boxer (Democratic) 52.4%; ▌Dennis McQuaid (Republican) 44.6%; ▌Howard C. Creighton (Libertarian) 1.7%; ▌Timothy-Allen Albertson (Peace and Freedom) 1.3%
California 7	George Miller	Democratic	1974	Incumbent re-elected.	▌ ✓ George Miller (Democratic) 67.2%; ▌Paul E. Vallely (Republican) 30.2%; ▌Rich Newell (Libertarian) 1.5%; ▌Terry L. Wells (American Independent) 1.2%
California 8	Ron Dellums	Democratic	1970	Incumbent re-elected.	▌ ✓ Ron Dellums (Democratic) 55.9%; ▌Claude B. Hutchison Jr. (Republican) 44.1%
California 9	Pete Stark	Democratic	1972	Incumbent re-elected.	▌ ✓ Pete Stark (Democratic) 60.7%; ▌Bill Kennedy (Republican) 39.3%
California 10	Don Edwards	Democratic	1962	Incumbent re-elected.	▌ ✓ Don Edwards (Democratic) 62.7%; ▌Bob Herriott (Republican) 33.7%; ▌Dale Burrow (Libertarian) 1.9%; ▌Edmon V. Kaiser (American Independent) 1.7%
California 11	Tom Lantos	Democratic	1980	Incumbent re-elected.	▌ ✓ Tom Lantos (Democratic) 57.1%; ▌William Royer (Republican) 39.7%; ▌Chuck Olson (Libertarian) 1.5%; ▌Wilson Branch (Peace and Freedom) 1.0%; ▌Nicholas Kudrovzeff (American Independent) 0.6%
California 12	Pete McCloskey	Republican	1967 (special)	Incumbent retired to run for U.S. senator. Republican hold.	▌ ✓ Ed Zschau (Republican) 63.0%; ▌Emmett Lynch (Democratic) 33.5%; ▌Bill White (Libertarian) 3.5%
California 13	Norman Mineta	Democratic	1974	Incumbent re-elected.	▌ ✓ Norman Mineta (Democratic) 65.9%; ▌Tom Kelly (Republican) 31.4%; ▌Al Hinkle (Libertarian) 2.7%
California 14	Norman D. Shumway	Republican	1978	Incumbent re-elected.	▌ ✓ Norman D. Shumway (Republican) 63.4%; ▌Baron Reed (Democratic) 36.6%
California 15	Tony Coelho	Democratic	1978	Incumbent re-elected.	▌ ✓ Tony Coelho (Democratic) 63.7%; ▌Ed Bates (Republican) 34.0%; ▌Stephen L. Gerringer (Libertarian) 2.3%
California 16	Leon Panetta	Democratic	1976	Incumbent re-elected.	▌ ✓ Leon Panetta (Democratic) 85.5%; ▌G. Richard Arnold (Republican) 14.3%
California 17	Chip Pashayan	Republican	1978	Incumbent re-elected.	▌ ✓ Chip Pashayan (Republican) 54.0%; ▌Gene Tackett (Democratic) 46.0%
California 18	None (district created)			New seat. Democratic gain.	▌ ✓ Richard H. Lehman (Democratic) 59.5%; ▌Adrian C. Fondse (Republican) 38.3%; ▌Marshall William Fritz (Libertarian) 2.2%
California 19	Bob Lagomarsino	Republican	1974	Incumbent re-elected.	▌ ✓ Bob Lagomarsino (Republican) 61.1%; ▌Frank Frost (Democratic) 35.8%; ▌R. C. Gordon-McCutchan (Libertarian) 2.3%; ▌Charles J. Zekan (Peace and Freedom) 0.8%
California 20	Bill Thomas; Redistricted from the 18th district	Republican	1978	Incumbent re-elected.	▌ ✓ Bill Thomas (Republican) 68.1%; ▌Robert J. Bethea (Democratic) 31.9%
California 21	Bobbi Fiedler	Republican	1980	Incumbent re-elected.	▌ ✓ Bobbi Fiedler (Republican) 71.8%; ▌George Henry Margolis (Democratic) 24.1%; ▌Daniel Wiener (Libertarian) 4.1%
California 21	Barry Goldwater Jr. Redistricted from the 20th district	Republican	1969 (special)	Incumbent retired to run for U.S. senator. Republican loss.	▌ ✓ Bobbi Fiedler (Republican) 71.8%; ▌George Henry Margolis (Democratic) 24.1%; ▌Daniel Wiener (Libertarian) 4.1%
California 22	Carlos Moorhead	Republican	1972	Incumbent re-elected.	▌ ✓ Carlos Moorhead (Republican) 73.6%; ▌Harvey L. Goldhammer (Democratic) 23.5%; ▌Robert T. Gerringer (Libertarian) 3.0%
California 23	Anthony Beilenson	Democratic	1976	Incumbent re-elected.	▌ ✓ Anthony Beilenson (Democratic) 59.6%; ▌David Armor (Republican) 40.4%
California 24	Henry Waxman	Democratic	1974	Incumbent re-elected.	▌ ✓ Henry Waxman (Democratic) 65.1%; ▌Jerry Zerg (Republican) 31.0%; ▌Jeff Mandel (Libertarian) 4.0%
California 25	Edward R. Roybal	Democratic	1962	Incumbent re-elected.	▌ ✓ Edward R. Roybal (Democratic) 85.5%; ▌Daniel John Gorham (Libertarian) 14.5%
California 26	None (district created)			New seat. Democratic gain.	▌ ✓ Howard Berman (Democratic) 59.6%; ▌Hal Phillips (Republican) 40.4%
California 27	Bob Dornan	Republican	1976	Incumbent retired to run for U.S. senator. Democratic gain.	▌ ✓ Mel Levine (Democratic) 59.5%; ▌Bart W. Christensen (Republican) 37.0%; ▌Zack Richardson (Libertarian) 3.5%
California 28	Julian Dixon	Democratic	1978	Incumbent re-elected.	▌ ✓ Julian Dixon (Democratic) 78.9%; ▌David Goerz (Republican) 18.7%; ▌David W. Meleney (Libertarian) 2.4%
California 29	Augustus Hawkins	Democratic	1962	Incumbent re-elected.	▌ ✓ Augustus Hawkins (Democratic) 79.8%; ▌Milton R. Mackaig (Republican) 20.2%
California 30	Matthew G. Martínez	Democratic	1982	Incumbent re-elected.	▌ ✓ Matthew G. Martínez (Democratic) 53.9%; ▌John H. Rousselot (Republican) 46.1%
California 30	John H. Rousselot; Redistricted from the 26th district	Republican	1960; 1962 (defeated); 1970 (special)	Incumbent lost re-election. Republican loss.	▌ ✓ Matthew G. Martínez (Democratic) 53.9%; ▌John H. Rousselot (Republican) 46.1%
California 31	Mervyn Dymally	Democratic	1980	Incumbent re-elected.	▌ ✓ Mervyn Dymally (Democratic) 72.4%; ▌Henry C. Minturn (Republican) 27.6%
California 32	Glenn M. Anderson	Democratic	1968	Incumbent re-elected.	▌ ✓ Glenn M. Anderson (Democratic) 58.0%; ▌Brian Lungren (Republican) 39.6%; ▌Eugene E. Ruyle (Peace and Freedom) 2.4%
California 33	Wayne R. Grisham	Republican	1978	Incumbent lost renomination. Republican loss.	▌ ✓ David Dreier (Republican) 65.2%; ▌Paul Servelle (Democratic) 32.2%; ▌Phillips B. Franklin (Libertarian) 1.3%; ▌Mike Noonan (Peace and Freedom) 1.3%
California 33	David Dreier; Redistricted from the 35th district	Republican	1980	Incumbent re-elected.	▌ ✓ David Dreier (Republican) 65.2%; ▌Paul Servelle (Democratic) 32.2%; ▌Phillips B. Franklin (Libertarian) 1.3%; ▌Mike Noonan (Peace and Freedom) 1.3%
California 34	None (district created)			New seat. Democratic gain.	▌ ✓ Esteban Torres (Democratic) 57.2%; ▌Paul R. Jackson (Republican) 42.8%
California 35	Jerry Lewis; Redistricted from the 37th district	Republican	1978	Incumbent re-elected.	▌ ✓ Jerry Lewis (Republican) 68.3%; ▌Robert E. Erwin (Democratic) 31.7%
California 36	George Brown Jr.	Democratic	1962; 1970 (retired); 1972	Incumbent re-elected.	▌ ✓ George Brown Jr. (Democratic) 54.3%; ▌John Paul Stark (Republican) 45.7%
California 37	None (district created)			New seat. Republican gain.	▌ ✓ Al McCandless (Republican) 59.1%; ▌Sam Cross (Democratic) 38.5%; ▌Marc R. Wruble (Libertarian) 2.4%
California 38	Jerry M. Patterson	Democratic	1974	Incumbent re-elected.	▌ ✓ Jerry M. Patterson (Democratic) 52.4%; ▌Bill Dohr (Republican) 43.4%; ▌Anita K. Barr (Libertarian) 4.2%
California 39	Bill Dannemeyer	Republican	1978	Incumbent re-elected.	▌ ✓ Bill Dannemeyer (Republican) 72.2%; ▌Frank G. Verges (Democratic) 26.0%; ▌Frank Boeheim (Peace and Freedom) 1.8%
California 40	Robert Badham	Republican	1976	Incumbent re-elected.	▌ ✓ Robert Badham (Republican) 71.5%; ▌Paul Haseman (Democratic) 26.1%; ▌Maxine Bell Quirk (Peace and Freedom) 2.4%
California 41	Bill Lowery	Republican	1980	Incumbent re-elected.	▌ ✓ Bill Lowery (Republican) 68.9%; ▌Tony Brandenburg (Democratic) 28.8%; ▌Everett Hale (Libertarian) 2.3%
California 42	Dan Lungren; Redistricted from the 34th district	Republican	1978	Incumbent re-elected.	▌ ✓ Dan Lungren (Republican) 69.0%; ▌James P. Spellman (Democratic) 28.3%; ▌John S. Donohue (Peace and Freedom) 2.7%
California 43	Clair Burgener	Republican	1972	Incumbent retired. Republican hold.	▌ ✓ Ron Packard (Republican) 36.8%; ▌Pat Archer (Democratic) 32.1%; ▌Johnnie R. Crean (Republican) 31.1%
California 44	None (district created)			New seat. Democratic gain.	▌ ✓ Jim Bates (Democratic) 64.9%; ▌Shirley M. Gissendanner (Republican) 31.8%; ▌Jim Conole (Libertarian) 3.2%
California 45	Duncan L. Hunter; Redistricted from the 42nd district	Republican	1980	Incumbent re-elected.	▌ ✓ Duncan L. Hunter (Republican) 68.6%; ▌Richard Hill (Democratic) 29.2%; ▌Jack R. Sanders (Republican) 2.2%

== Colorado ==
Colorado added a sixth seat in reapportionment, adding the new district near Denver.

District	Incumbent			This race	
District	Member	Party	First elected	Results	Candidates
Colorado 1	Pat Schroeder	Democratic	1972	Incumbent re-elected.	▌ ✓ Pat Schroeder (Democratic) 60.3%; ▌Arch Decker (Republican) 37.4%; ▌Robin White (Libertarian) 2.3%
Colorado 2	Tim Wirth	Democratic	1974	Incumbent re-elected.	▌ ✓ Tim Wirth (Democratic) 61.8%; ▌John C. Buechner (Republican) 36.4%; ▌Charles Jackson (Libertarian) 1.7%
Colorado 3	Ray Kogovsek	Democratic	1978	Incumbent re-elected.	▌ ✓ Ray Kogovsek (Democratic) 53.4%; ▌Tom Wiens (Republican) 44.8%; ▌Stormy Mohn (Libertarian) 1.4%; ▌Henry John Olshaw (Independent) 0.4%
Colorado 4	Hank Brown	Republican	1980	Incumbent re-elected.	▌ ✓ Hank Brown (Republican) 69.8%; ▌Bud Bishopp (Democratic) 30.2%
Colorado 5	Ken Kramer	Republican	1978	Incumbent re-elected.	▌ ✓ Ken Kramer (Republican) 59.5%; ▌Tom Cronin (Democratic) 40.5%
Colorado 6	None (district created)			New seat. Republican gain.	▌ ✓ Jack Swigert (Republican) 62.2% (Note: Swigert died from bone cancer on December 27, 1982, before taking office.); ▌Steve Hogan (Democratic) 35.6%; ▌J. Craig Green (Libertarian) 2.3%

== Connecticut ==
District	Incumbent			This race	
District	Member	Party	First elected	Results	Candidates
Connecticut 1	Barbara B. Kennelly	Democratic	1982	Incumbent re-elected.	▌ ✓ Barbara B. Kennelly (Democratic) 68.1%; ▌Herschel A. Klein (Republican) 31.2%; ▌Daniel M. Landerfin (Libertarian) 0.7%
Connecticut 2	Sam Gejdenson	Democratic	1980	Incumbent re-elected.	▌ ✓ Sam Gejdenson (Democratic) 55.8%; ▌Tony Guglielmo (Republican) 43.5%; ▌Donald W. Wood (Libertarian) 0.7%
Connecticut 3	Larry DeNardis	Republican	1980	Incumbent lost re-election. Democratic gain.	▌ ✓ Bruce A. Morrison (Democratic) 50.0%; ▌Larry DeNardis (Republican) 49.0%; Others: ▌Michael R. Cohen (Libertarian) 0.6%; ▌Joelle R. Fishman (Communist) 0.4%
Connecticut 4	Stewart McKinney	Republican	1970	Incumbent re-elected.	▌ ✓ Stewart McKinney (Republican) 56.5%; ▌John A. Phillips (Democratic) 42.9%; ▌Lothar Frank (Libertarian) 0.7%
Connecticut 5	William R. Ratchford	Democratic	1978	Incumbent re-elected.	▌ ✓ William R. Ratchford (Democratic) 58.5%; ▌Neal B. Hanlon (Republican) 40.8%; ▌Jerry Brennan (Libertarian) 0.7%
Connecticut 6	Toby Moffett	Democratic	1974	Incumbent retired to run for U.S. Senator. Republican gain.	▌ ✓ Nancy Johnson (Republican) 51.7%; ▌William E. Curry Jr. (Democratic) 47.8%; ▌Monte Dunn (Libertarian) 0.6%

== Delaware ==
District	Incumbent			This race	
District	Member	Party	First elected	Results	Candidates
Delaware at-large	Tom Evans	Republican	1976	Incumbent lost re-election. Democratic gain.	▌ ✓ Tom Carper (Democratic) 52.4%; ▌Tom Evans (Republican) 46.3%; Others: ▌Mary D. Gies (American) 0.6%; ▌Richard A. Cohen (Libertarian) 0.4%; ▌David A. Nuttall (Citizens) 0.3%

== Florida ==
Florida added 4 new districts, going from 15 to 19 seats, adding a new district near Miami and 3 more in central and southwestern Florida.

District	Incumbent			This race	
District	Member	Party	First elected	Results	Candidates
Florida 1	Earl Hutto	Democratic	1978	Incumbent re-elected.	▌ ✓ Earl Hutto (Democratic) 74.4%; ▌J. Terryl Bechtol (Republican) 25.6%
Florida 2	Don Fuqua	Democratic	1962	Incumbent re-elected.	▌ ✓ Don Fuqua (Democratic) 61.7%; ▌Ron McNeil (Republican) 38.3%
Florida 3	Charles E. Bennett	Democratic	1948	Incumbent re-elected.	▌ ✓ Charles E. Bennett (Democratic) 84.1%; ▌George Grimsley (Republican) 15.9%
Florida 4	Bill Chappell	Democratic	1968	Incumbent re-elected.	▌ ✓ Bill Chappell (Democratic) 66.9%; ▌Larry Gaudet (Republican) 33.1%
Florida 5	Bill McCollum	Republican	1980	Incumbent re-elected.	▌ ✓ Bill McCollum (Republican) 58.8%; ▌Dick Batchelor (Democratic) 41.2%
Florida 6	None (district created)			New seat. Democratic gain.	▌ ✓ Buddy MacKay (Democratic) 61.4%; ▌Ed Havill (Republican) 38.6%
Florida 7	Sam Gibbons	Democratic	1962	Incumbent re-elected.	▌ ✓ Sam Gibbons (Democratic) 74.2%; ▌Ken Ayers (Republican) 25.8%
Florida 8	Bill Young; Redistricted from the 6th district	Republican	1970	Incumbent re-elected.	▌ ✓ Bill Young (Republican) Uncontested
Florida 9	None (district created)			New seat. Republican gain.	▌ ✓ Michael Bilirakis (Republican) 51.2%; ▌George H. Sheldon (Democratic) 48.8%
Florida 10	Andy Ireland; Redistricted from the 8th district	Democratic	1976	Incumbent re-elected.	▌ ✓ Andy Ireland (Democratic) Uncontested
Florida 11	Bill Nelson; Redistricted from the 9th district	Democratic	1978	Incumbent re-elected.	▌ ✓ Bill Nelson (Democratic) 70.6%; ▌Joel Robinson (Republican) 29.4%
Florida 12	Skip Bafalis; Redistricted from the 10th district	Republican	1972	Incumbent retired to run for Governor of Florida. Republican hold.	▌ ✓ Tom Lewis (Republican) 52.6%; ▌Brad Culverhouse (Democratic) 47.4%
Florida 13	None (district created)			New seat. Republican gain.	▌ ✓ Connie Mack III (Republican) 65.1%; ▌Dana N. Stevens (Democratic) 34.9%
Florida 14	Dan Mica; Redistricted from the 11th district	Democratic	1978	Incumbent re-elected.	▌ ✓ Dan Mica (Democratic) 73.0%; ▌Steve Mitchell (Republican) 27.0%
Florida 15	Clay Shaw; Redistricted from the 12th district	Republican	1980	Incumbent re-elected.	▌ ✓ Clay Shaw (Republican) 57.1%; ▌Ed Stack (Democratic) 42.9%
Florida 16	None (district created)			New seat. Democratic gain.	▌ ✓ Larry Smith (Democratic) 67.9%; ▌Maurice Berkowitz (Republican) 32.1%
Florida 17	William Lehman; Redistricted from the 13th district	Democratic	1972	Incumbent re-elected.	▌ ✓ William Lehman (Democratic) Uncontested
Florida 18	Claude Pepper; Redistricted from the 14th district	Democratic	1962	Incumbent re-elected.	▌ ✓ Claude Pepper (Democratic) 71.2%; ▌Ricardo Nunez (Republican) 28.8%
Florida 19	Dante Fascell; Redistricted from the 15th district	Democratic	1954	Incumbent re-elected.	▌ ✓ Dante Fascell (Democratic) 58.8%; ▌Glenn Rinker (Republican) 41.2%

== Georgia ==
District	Incumbent			This race	
District	Member	Party	First elected	Results	Candidates
Georgia 1	Bo Ginn	Democratic	1972	Incumbent retired to run for Governor of Georgia. Democratic hold.	▌ ✓ Lindsay Thomas (Democratic) 64.1%; ▌Herb Jones (Republican) 35.9%
Georgia 2	Charles Hatcher	Democratic	1980	Incumbent re-elected.	▌ ✓ Charles Hatcher (Democratic) 100%
Georgia 3	Jack Brinkley	Democratic	1966	Incumbent retired. Democratic hold.	▌ ✓ Richard Ray (Democratic) 71.0%; ▌Tyron Elliott (Republican) 29.0%
Georgia 4	Elliott H. Levitas	Democratic	1974	Incumbent re-elected.	▌ ✓ Elliott H. Levitas (Democratic) 65.5%; ▌Dick Winder (Republican) 34.5%
Georgia 5	Wyche Fowler	Democratic	1977 (special)	Incumbent re-elected.	▌ ✓ Wyche Fowler (Democratic) 80.8%; ▌Billy McKinney (Independent) 13.7%; ▌Paul Jones (Republican) 5.5%
Georgia 6	Newt Gingrich	Republican	1978	Incumbent re-elected.	▌ ✓ Newt Gingrich (Republican) 55.3%; ▌Jim Wood (Democratic) 44.7%
Georgia 7	Larry McDonald	Democratic	1974	Incumbent re-elected.	▌ ✓ Larry McDonald (Democratic) 61.1%; ▌Dave Sellers (Republican) 38.9%
Georgia 8	Billy Lee Evans	Democratic	1976	Incumbent lost renomination. Democratic hold.	▌ ✓ J. Roy Rowland (Democratic) 100%
Georgia 9	Ed Jenkins	Democratic	1976	Incumbent re-elected.	▌ ✓ Ed Jenkins (Democratic) 77.0%; ▌Charles Sherwood (Republican) 23.0%
Georgia 10	Doug Barnard Jr.	Democratic	1976	Incumbent re-elected.	▌ ✓ Doug Barnard Jr. (Democratic) 100%

== Hawaii ==
District	Incumbent			This race	
District	Member	Party	First elected	Results	Candidates
Hawaii 1	Cecil Heftel	Democratic	1976	Incumbent re-elected.	▌ ✓ Cecil Heftel (Democratic) 89.9%; ▌Rockne H. Johnson (Libertarian) 10.1%
Hawaii 2	Daniel Akaka	Democratic	1976	Incumbent re-elected.	▌ ✓ Daniel Akaka (Democratic) 89.2%; ▌Gregory B. Mills (Independent) 6.1%; ▌Amelia Lew Fritts (Libertarian) 4.6%

== Idaho ==
District	Incumbent			This race	
District	Member	Party	First elected	Results	Candidates
Idaho 1	Larry Craig	Republican	1980	Incumbent re-elected.	▌ ✓ Larry Craig (Republican) 53.7%; ▌Larry LaRocco (Democratic) 46.3%
Idaho 2	George V. Hansen	Republican	1964; 1968 (retired); 1974	Incumbent re-elected.	▌ ✓ George V. Hansen (Republican) 52.3%; ▌Richard H. Stallings (Democratic) 47.7%

== Illinois ==
Illinois lost two seats at reapportionment, removing two districts with Republican incumbents, and at the same time two other Republican incumbents lost re-election in altered districts.

District	Incumbent			This race	
District	Member	Party	First elected	Results	Candidates
Illinois 1	Harold Washington	Democratic	1980	Incumbent re-elected.	▌ ✓ Harold Washington (Democratic) 97.3%; ▌Charles Allen Taliaferro (Republican) 2.7%
Illinois 2	Gus Savage	Democratic	1980	Incumbent re-elected.	▌ ✓ Gus Savage (Democratic) 87.2%; ▌Kevin Walker Sparks (Republican) 12.8%
Illinois 3	Marty Russo	Democratic	1974	Incumbent re-elected.	▌ ✓ Marty Russo (Democratic) 74.0%; ▌Richard D. Murphy (Republican) 26.0%
Illinois 4	Ed Derwinski	Republican	1958	Incumbent lost renomination. Republican loss.	▌ ✓ George M. O'Brien (Republican) 54.6%; ▌Michael A. Murer (Democratic) 45.4%
Illinois 4	George M. O'Brien; Redistricted from the 17th district	Republican	1972	Incumbent re-elected.	▌ ✓ George M. O'Brien (Republican) 54.6%; ▌Michael A. Murer (Democratic) 45.4%
Illinois 5	John G. Fary	Democratic	1975 (special)	Incumbent lost renomination. Democratic hold.	▌ ✓ Bill Lipinski (Democratic) 75.4%; ▌Daniel J. Partyka (Republican) 24.6%
Illinois 6	Henry Hyde	Republican	1974	Incumbent re-elected.	▌ ✓ Henry Hyde (Republican) 68.4%; ▌LeRoy E. Kennel (Democratic) 31.6%
Illinois 7	Cardiss Collins	Democratic	1973 (special)	Incumbent re-elected.	▌ ✓ Cardiss Collins (Democratic) 86.5%; ▌Dan Cheeks (Republican) 13.5%
Illinois 8	Dan Rostenkowski	Democratic	1958	Incumbent re-elected.	▌ ✓ Dan Rostenkowski (Democratic) 83.4%; ▌Bonnie Hickey (Republican) 16.6%
Illinois 9	Sidney R. Yates	Democratic	1948; 1962 (retired); 1964	Incumbent re-elected.	▌ ✓ Sidney R. Yates (Democratic) 66.5%; ▌Catherine Bertini (Republican) 32.0%; ▌Sheila Jones (Anti-Drug) 1.5%
Illinois 10	John Porter	Republican	1980	Incumbent re-elected.	▌ ✓ John Porter (Republican) 59.0%; ▌Eugenia S. Chapman (Democratic) 41.0%
Illinois 10	Robert McClory; Redistricted from the 13th district	Republican	1962	Incumbent retired. Republican loss.	▌ ✓ John Porter (Republican) 59.0%; ▌Eugenia S. Chapman (Democratic) 41.0%
Illinois 11	Frank Annunzio	Democratic	1964	Incumbent re-elected.	▌ ✓ Frank Annunzio (Democratic) 72.6%; ▌James F. Moynihan (Republican) 27.4%
Illinois 12	Phil Crane	Republican	1969 (special)	Incumbent re-elected.	▌ ✓ Phil Crane (Republican) 66.2%; ▌Daniel G. DeFosse (Democratic) 30.7%; ▌Joan T. Jarosz (Libertarian) 3.1%
Illinois 13	John N. Erlenborn; Redistricted from the 14th district	Republican	1964	Incumbent re-elected.	▌ ✓ John N. Erlenborn (Republican) 69.8%; ▌Bob Bily (Democratic) 30.2%
Illinois 14	Tom Corcoran; Redistricted from the 15th district	Republican	1976	Incumbent re-elected.	▌ ✓ Tom Corcoran (Republican) 64.6%; ▌Dan McGrath (Democratic) 35.4%
Illinois 15	Ed Madigan; Redistricted from the 21st district	Republican	1972	Incumbent re-elected.	▌ ✓ Ed Madigan (Republican) 66.3%; ▌Tim L. Hall (Democratic) 33.7%
Illinois 16	Lynn M. Martin	Republican	1980	Incumbent re-elected.	▌ ✓ Lynn M. Martin (Republican) 57.2%; ▌Skip Schwerdtfeger (Democratic) 42.8%
Illinois 17	Tom Railsback; Redistricted from the 19th district	Republican	1966	Incumbent lost renomination. Democratic gain.	▌ ✓ Lane Evans (Democratic) 52.8%; ▌Kenneth G. McMillan (Republican) 47.2%
Illinois 18	Robert H. Michel	Republican	1956	Incumbent re-elected.	▌ ✓ Robert H. Michel (Republican) 51.6%; ▌G. Douglas Stephens (Democratic) 48.4%
Illinois 19	Dan Crane; Redistricted from the 22nd district	Republican	1978	Incumbent re-elected.	▌ ✓ Dan Crane (Republican) 52.1%; ▌John Gwinn (Democratic) 47.9%
Illinois 20	Paul Findley	Republican	1960	Incumbent lost re-election. Democratic gain.	▌ ✓ Dick Durbin (Democratic) 50.4%; ▌Paul Findley (Republican) 49.6%
Illinois 21	Melvin Price; Redistricted from the 23rd district	Democratic	1944	Incumbent re-elected.	▌ ✓ Melvin Price (Democratic) 63.7%; ▌Robert H. Gaffner (Republican) 33.3%; ▌Sandra L. Climaco (Good Government) 3.1%
Illinois 22	Paul Simon; Redistricted from the 24th district	Democratic	1974	Incumbent re-elected.	▌ ✓ Paul Simon (Democratic) 66.2%; ▌Peter G. Prineas (Republican) 33.8%

== Indiana ==
Indiana lost one seat at reapportionment; Republicans in the legislature deleted two Democratic districts and added a new Republican district, although this strategy was offset by the unexpected defeat of incumbent H. Joel Deckard.

District	Incumbent			This race	
District	Member	Party	First elected	Results	Candidates
Indiana 1	Adam Benjamin Jr.	Democratic	1976	Incumbent died. Democratic hold.	▌ ✓ Katie Hall (Democratic) 56.3%; ▌Thomas H. Krieger (Republican) 43.1%; ▌Jesse Smith (Socialist Workers) 0.5%
Indiana 2	Philip R. Sharp; Redistricted from the 10th district	Democratic	1974	Incumbent re-elected.	▌ ✓ Philip R. Sharp (Democratic) 56.2%; ▌Ralph VanNatta (Republican) 43.8%
Indiana 3	John P. Hiler	Republican	1980	Incumbent re-elected.	▌ ✓ John P. Hiler (Republican) 51.2%; ▌Richard Clay Bodine (Democratic) 48.8%
Indiana 4	Dan Coats	Republican	1980	Incumbent re-elected.	▌ ✓ Dan Coats (Republican) 64.3%; ▌Roger M. Miller (Democratic) 35.1%; ▌John B. Cameron (American) 0.6%
Indiana 5	Elwood Hillis	Republican	1970	Incumbent re-elected.	▌ ✓ Elwood Hillis (Republican) 61.1%; ▌Allen B. Maxwell (Democratic) 38.9%
Indiana 6	None (district created)			New seat. Republican gain.	▌ ✓ Dan Burton (Republican) 64.9%; ▌George Grabianowski (Democratic) 35.1%
Indiana 7	John T. Myers	Republican	1966	Incumbent re-elected.	▌ ✓ John T. Myers (Republican) 62.3%; ▌Stephen S. Bonney (Democratic) 37.7%
Indiana 7	Floyd Fithian; Redistricted from the 2nd district	Democratic	1974	Incumbent retired to run for U.S. Senator. Democratic loss.	▌ ✓ John T. Myers (Republican) 62.3%; ▌Stephen S. Bonney (Democratic) 37.7%
Indiana 8	H. Joel Deckard	Republican	1978	Incumbent lost re-election. Democratic gain.	▌ ✓ Frank McCloskey (Democratic) 51.4%; ▌H. Joel Deckard (Republican) 48.1%; ▌Robert F. Arnove (Citizens) 0.5%
Indiana 9	Lee Hamilton	Democratic	1964	Incumbent re-elected.	▌ ✓ Lee Hamilton (Democratic) 67.1%; ▌Floyd Coates (Republican) 32.4%; ▌Stephen Arnold (Citizens) 0.5%
Indiana 10	Andrew Jacobs Jr. Redistricted from the 11th district	Democratic	1964; 1972 (defeated); 1974	Incumbent re-elected.	▌ ✓ Andrew Jacobs Jr. (Democratic) 66.7%; ▌Michael A. Carroll (Republican) 33.2%; ▌David W. Ellis (Socialist Workers) 0.1%
Indiana 10	David W. Evans; Redistricted from the 6th district	Democratic	1974	Incumbent lost renomination. Democratic loss.	▌ ✓ Andrew Jacobs Jr. (Democratic) 66.7%; ▌Michael A. Carroll (Republican) 33.2%; ▌David W. Ellis (Socialist Workers) 0.1%

== Iowa ==
District	Incumbent			This race	
District	Member	Party	First elected	Results	Candidates
Iowa 1	Jim Leach	Republican	1976	Incumbent re-elected.	▌ ✓ Jim Leach (Republican) 59.2%; ▌William E. Gluba (Democratic) 40.8%
Iowa 2	Tom Tauke	Republican	1978	Incumbent re-elected.	▌ ✓ Tom Tauke (Republican) 58.9%; ▌Brent Appel (Democratic) 41.1%
Iowa 3	T. Cooper Evans	Republican	1980	Incumbent re-elected.	▌ ✓ T. Cooper Evans (Republican) 55.5%; ▌Lynn G. Cutler (Democratic) 44.5%
Iowa 4	Neal Smith	Democratic	1958	Incumbent re-elected.	▌ ✓ Neal Smith (Democratic) 66.0%; ▌Dave Readinger (Republican) 33.6%; ▌Bill Douglas (Socialist) 0.3%
Iowa 5	Tom Harkin	Democratic	1974	Incumbent re-elected.	▌ ✓ Tom Harkin (Democratic) 58.9%; ▌Arlyn E. Danker (Republican) 41.1%
Iowa 6	Berkley Bedell	Democratic	1974	Incumbent re-elected.	▌ ✓ Berkley Bedell (Democratic) 64.3%; ▌Al Bremer (Republican) 35.7%

== Kansas ==
District	Incumbent			This race	
District	Member	Party	First elected	Results	Candidates
Kansas 1	Pat Roberts	Republican	1980	Incumbent re-elected.	▌ ✓ Pat Roberts (Republican) 68.4%; ▌Kent Roth (Democratic) 30.2%; ▌Kent Earnest (Libertarian) 1.4%
Kansas 2	James Edmund Jeffries	Republican	1978	Incumbent retired. Democratic gain.	▌ ✓ Jim Slattery (Democratic) 57.4%; ▌Morris Kay (Republican) 42.6%
Kansas 3	Larry Winn	Republican	1966	Incumbent re-elected.	▌ ✓ Larry Winn (Republican) 59.2%; ▌William L. Kostar (Democratic) 38.3%; ▌Gene R. Blair (Libertarian) 2.5%
Kansas 4	Dan Glickman	Democratic	1976	Incumbent re-elected.	▌ ✓ Dan Glickman (Democratic) 73.9%; ▌Jerry Caywood (Republican) 24.4%; ▌Karl Peterjohn (Libertarian) 1.6%
Kansas 5	Bob Whittaker	Republican	1978	Incumbent re-elected.	▌ ✓ Bob Whittaker (Republican) 67.6%; ▌Lee Rowe (Democratic) 31.1%; ▌John L. Conger (Libertarian) 1.2%

== Kentucky ==
District	Incumbent			This race	
District	Member	Party	First elected	Results	Candidates
Kentucky 1	Carroll Hubbard	Democratic	1974	Incumbent re-elected.	▌ ✓ Carroll Hubbard (Democratic) 100%
Kentucky 2	William Natcher	Democratic	1953 (special)	Incumbent re-elected.	▌ ✓ William Natcher (Democratic) 73.8%; ▌Mark Watson (Republican) 26.2%
Kentucky 3	Romano Mazzoli	Democratic	1970	Incumbent re-elected.	▌ ✓ Romano Mazzoli (Democratic) 65.1%; ▌Carl Brown (Republican) 32.2%; ▌Norbert D. Leveronne (Independent) 2.0%; Others: ▌Dan Murray (Libertarian) 0.4%; ▌Craig Honts (Socialist Workers) 0.3%
Kentucky 4	Gene Snyder	Republican	1962; 1964 (defeated); 1966	Incumbent re-elected.	▌ ✓ Gene Snyder (Republican) 54.2%; ▌Terry L. Mann (Democratic) 45.3%; ▌Paul Thiel (Libertarian) 0.5%
Kentucky 5	Hal Rogers	Republican	1980	Incumbent re-elected.	▌ ✓ Hal Rogers (Republican) 65.2%; ▌Doye Davenport (Democratic) 34.8%
Kentucky 6	Larry J. Hopkins	Republican	1978	Incumbent re-elected.	▌ ✓ Larry J. Hopkins (Republican) 56.8%; ▌Don Mills (Democratic) 41.4%; Others: ▌Ken Ashby (Libertarian) 1.0%; ▌Don B. Pratt (Independent) 0.8%
Kentucky 7	Carl D. Perkins	Democratic	1948	Incumbent re-elected.	▌ ✓ Carl D. Perkins (Democratic) 79.4%; ▌Tom Hamby (Republican) 20.6%

== Louisiana ==
All eight incumbents were re-elected by receiving more than 50% of the vote in the September 11 non-partisan blanket primaries.

District	Incumbent			This race	
District	Member	Party	First elected	Results	Candidates
Louisiana 1	Bob Livingston	Republican	1977 (special)	Incumbent re-elected.	▌ ✓ Bob Livingston (Republican) 85.8%; ▌Murphy O. Greene (Independent) 7.5%; ▌Suzanne Weiss (Independent) 6.7%
Louisiana 2	Lindy Boggs	Democratic	1973 (special)	Incumbent re-elected.	▌ ✓ Lindy Boggs (Democratic) 77.0%; ▌Roger C. Johnson (Democratic) 23.0%
Louisiana 3	Billy Tauzin	Democratic	1980	Incumbent re-elected.	▌ ✓ Billy Tauzin (Democratic) Uncontested
Louisiana 4	Buddy Roemer	Democratic	1980	Incumbent re-elected.	▌ ✓ Buddy Roemer (Democratic) Uncontested
Louisiana 5	Jerry Huckaby	Democratic	1976	Incumbent re-elected.	▌ ✓ Jerry Huckaby (Democratic) 83.7%; ▌Donald M. Greene (Democratic) 7.1%; ▌L. D. Knox (Independent) 5.6%; ▌Ronnie King (Democratic) 3.6%
Louisiana 6	Henson Moore	Republican	1974	Incumbent re-elected.	▌ ✓ Henson Moore (Republican) 77.1%; ▌James D. Agnew (Independent) 22.9%
Louisiana 7	John Breaux	Democratic	1972	Incumbent re-elected.	▌ ✓ John Breaux (Democratic) 79.0%; ▌Johnny Myers (Democratic) 21.0%
Louisiana 8	Gillis William Long	Democratic	1962; 1964 (lost renomination); 1972	Re-elected in primary	▌ ✓ Gillis William Long (Democratic) 59.6%; ▌Ned Randolph (Democratic) 39.1%; ▌Rosemary Rummler (Independent) 1.2%

== Maine ==
District	Incumbent			This race	
District	Member	Party	First elected	Results	Candidates
Maine 1	David F. Emery	Republican	1974	Incumbent retired to run for U.S. Senator. Republican hold.	▌ ✓ Jock McKernan (Republican) 50.4%; ▌John M. Kerry (Democratic) 47.9%; ▌Gregory J. Fleming (Libertarian) 1.7%
Maine 2	Olympia Snowe	Republican	1978	Incumbent re-elected.	▌ ✓ Olympia Snowe (Republican) 66.7%; ▌James P. Dunleavy (Democratic) 33.3%

== Maryland ==
District	Incumbent			This race	
District	Member	Party	First elected	Results	Candidates
Maryland 1	Roy Dyson	Democratic	1980	Incumbent re-elected.	▌ ✓ Roy Dyson (Democratic) 69.3%; ▌C. A. Porter Hopkins (Republican) 30.7%
Maryland 2	Clarence Long	Democratic	1962	Incumbent re-elected.	▌ ✓ Clarence Long (Democratic) 52.6%; ▌Helen Delich Bentley (Republican) 47.4%
Maryland 3	Barbara Mikulski	Democratic	1976	Incumbent re-elected.	▌ ✓ Barbara Mikulski (Democratic) 74.2%; ▌H. Robert Scherr (Republican) 25.8%
Maryland 4	Marjorie Holt	Republican	1972	Incumbent re-elected.	▌ ✓ Marjorie Holt (Republican) 61.2%; ▌Patricia O'Brien Aiken (Democratic) 38.8%
Maryland 5	Steny Hoyer	Democratic	1981 (special)	Incumbent re-elected.	▌ ✓ Steny Hoyer (Democratic) 79.6%; ▌William P. Guthrie (Republican) 20.4%
Maryland 6	Beverly Byron	Democratic	1978	Incumbent re-elected.	▌ ✓ Beverly Byron (Democratic) 74.4%; ▌Roscoe Bartlett (Republican) 25.6%
Maryland 7	Parren Mitchell	Democratic	1970	Incumbent re-elected.	▌ ✓ Parren Mitchell (Democratic) 87.9%; ▌M. Leonora Jones (Republican) 12.1%
Maryland 8	Michael D. Barnes	Democratic	1978	Incumbent re-elected.	▌ ✓ Michael D. Barnes (Democratic) 71.3%; ▌Elizabeth W. Spencer (Republican) 28.7%

== Massachusetts ==
Massachusetts lost one seat at reapportionment, combining the districts of Barney Frank and Margaret Heckler.

District	Incumbent			This race	
District	Member	Party	First elected	Results	Candidates
Massachusetts 1	Silvio O. Conte	Republican	1958	Incumbent re-elected.	▌ ✓ Silvio O. Conte (Republican) 99.5%
Massachusetts 2	Edward Boland	Democratic	1952	Incumbent re-elected.	▌ ✓ Edward Boland (Democratic) 72.6%; ▌Thomas P. Swank (Republican) 27.4%
Massachusetts 3	Joseph D. Early	Democratic	1974	Incumbent re-elected.	▌ ✓ Joseph D. Early (Democratic) 99.9%
Massachusetts 4	Barney Frank	Democratic	1980	Incumbent re-elected.	▌ ✓ Barney Frank (Democratic) 59.5%; ▌Margaret Heckler (Republican) 40.5%
Massachusetts 4	Margaret Heckler; Redistricted from the 10th district	Republican	1966	Incumbent lost re-election. Republican loss.	▌ ✓ Barney Frank (Democratic) 59.5%; ▌Margaret Heckler (Republican) 40.5%
Massachusetts 5	James Shannon	Democratic	1978	Incumbent re-elected.	▌ ✓ James Shannon (Democratic) 84.7%; ▌Angelo Louis Laudani (Republican) 15.3%
Massachusetts 6	Nicholas Mavroules	Democratic	1978	Incumbent re-elected.	▌ ✓ Nicholas Mavroules (Democratic) 57.8%; ▌Thomas Trimarco (Republican) 42.2%
Massachusetts 7	Ed Markey	Democratic	1976	Incumbent re-elected.	▌ ✓ Ed Markey (Democratic) 77.8%; ▌David M. Basile (Republican) 22.2%
Massachusetts 8	Tip O'Neill	Democratic	1952	Incumbent re-elected.	▌ ✓ Tip O'Neill (Democratic) 74.9%; ▌Frank L. McNamara Jr. (Republican) 25.1%
Massachusetts 9	Joe Moakley	Democratic	1972	Incumbent re-elected.	▌ ✓ Joe Moakley (Democratic) 64.1%; ▌Deborah R. Cochran (Republican) 34.3%; ▌Valerie Eckart (Socialist Workers) 1.6%
Massachusetts 10	Gerry Studds; Redistricted from the 12th district	Democratic	1972	Incumbent re-elected.	▌ ✓ Gerry Studds (Democratic) 68.7%; ▌John E. Conway (Republican) 31.3%
Massachusetts 11	Brian J. Donnelly	Democratic	1978	Incumbent re-elected.	▌ ✓ Brian J. Donnelly (Democratic) 100%

== Michigan ==
Michigan lost one seat at reapportionment.

District	Incumbent			This race	
District	Member	Party	First elected	Results	Candidates
Michigan 1	John Conyers	Democratic	1964	Incumbent re-elected.	▌ ✓ John Conyers (Democratic) 96.7%; ▌William B. Krebaum (Libertarian) 2.5%; ▌Eddie Benjamin (Workers League) 0.9%
Michigan 2	Carl Pursell	Republican	1976	Incumbent re-elected.	▌ ✓ Carl Pursell (Republican) 65.5%; ▌George Wahl Sallade (Democratic) 32.5%; ▌Barbara J. McKenna (Libertarian) 2.1%
Michigan 3	Howard Wolpe	Democratic	1978	Incumbent re-elected.	▌ ✓ Howard Wolpe (Democratic) 56.3%; ▌Richard L. Milliman (Republican) 42.6%; Others: ▌Robert S. Holderbaum (Libertarian) 0.6%; ▌Lizzie M. Hudson (American Independent) 0.4%
Michigan 4	Mark D. Siljander	Republican	1981 (special)	Incumbent re-elected.	▌ ✓ Mark D. Siljander (Republican) 59.7%; ▌David A. Masiokas (Democratic) 38.8%; ▌Robert Wagner (Libertarian) 1.1%; ▌Robert Drenkhahn (American Independent) 0.5%
Michigan 5	Harold S. Sawyer	Republican	1976	Incumbent re-elected.	▌ ✓ Harold S. Sawyer (Republican) 53.1%; ▌Stephen V. Monsma (Democratic) 46.9%
Michigan 6	James Whitney Dunn	Republican	1980	Incumbent lost re-election. Democratic gain.	▌ ✓ Bob Carr (Democratic) 51.4%; ▌Jim Dunn (Republican) 47.5%; ▌James E. Hurrell (Libertarian) 1.1%
Michigan 7	Dale Kildee	Democratic	1976	Incumbent re-elected.	▌ ✓ Dale Kildee (Democratic) 75.4%; ▌George R. Darrah (Republican) 23.1%; ▌Dennis L. Berry (Libertarian) 1.2%; ▌David Freund (Workers League) 0.4%
Michigan 8	J. Bob Traxler	Democratic	1974	Incumbent re-elected.	▌ ✓ J. Bob Traxler (Democratic) 91.0%; ▌Sheila M. Hart (Libertarian) 9.0%
Michigan 9	Guy Vander Jagt	Republican	1966	Incumbent re-elected.	▌ ✓ Guy Vander Jagt (Republican) 64.9%; ▌Gerald D. Warner (Democratic) 35.1%
Michigan 10	Donald J. Albosta	Democratic	1978	Incumbent re-elected.	▌ ✓ Don Albosta (Democratic) 60.1%; ▌Lawrence W. Reed (Republican) 38.9%; ▌William Spiers (Libertarian) 0.9%
Michigan 11	Robert William Davis	Republican	1978	Incumbent re-elected.	▌ ✓ Robert William Davis (Republican) 60.5%; ▌Kent Bourland (Democratic) 39.5%
Michigan 12	David Bonior	Democratic	1976	Incumbent re-elected.	▌ ✓ David Bonior (Democratic) 65.9%; ▌Ray Contesti (Republican) 33.2%; ▌Keith P. Edwards (Libertarian) 1.0%
Michigan 13	George Crockett Jr.	Democratic	1980	Incumbent re-elected.	▌ ✓ George Crockett Jr. (Democratic) 88.0%; ▌Letty Gupta (Republican) 11.1%; ▌Eddie Benjamin (Workers League) 0.9%
Michigan 14	Dennis Hertel	Democratic	1980	Incumbent re-elected.	▌ ✓ Dennis Hertel (Democratic) 95.0%; ▌Harold H. Dunn (Libertarian) 5.0%
Michigan 15	William D. Ford	Democratic	1964	Incumbent re-elected.	▌ ✓ William D. Ford (Democratic) 72.8%; ▌Mitchell Moran (Republican) 26.0%; ▌Guy R. Collins (American Independent) 1.2%
Michigan 16	John Dingell	Democratic	1955 (special)	Incumbent re-elected.	▌ ✓ John Dingell (Democratic) 73.7%; ▌David K. Haskins (Republican) 25.3%; Others: ▌Susan Apstein (Socialist Workers) 0.7%; ▌Paul Scherrer (Workers League) 0.3%
Michigan 17	William M. Brodhead	Democratic	1974	Incumbent retired. Democratic hold.	▌ ✓ Sander Levin (Democratic) 66.6%; ▌Gerald E. Rosen (Republican) 31.7%; ▌Virginia L. Cropsey (Libertarian) 1.7%
Michigan 17	James J. Blanchard; Redistricted from the 18th district	Democratic	1974	Incumbent retired to run for Governor of Michigan. Democratic loss.	▌ ✓ Sander Levin (Democratic) 66.6%; ▌Gerald E. Rosen (Republican) 31.7%; ▌Virginia L. Cropsey (Libertarian) 1.7%
Michigan 18	William Broomfield; Redistricted from the 19th district	Republican	1956	Incumbent re-elected.	▌ ✓ William Broomfield (Republican) 73.3%; ▌Allen J. SIpher (Democratic) 25.7%; ▌Joseph Cote (Libertarian) 1.0%

== Minnesota ==
District	Incumbent			This race	
District	Member	Party	First elected	Results	Candidates
Minnesota 1	Tom Hagedorn; Redistricted from the 2nd district	Independent- Republican	1974	Incumbent lost re-election. DFL gain.	▌ ✓ Tim Penny (DFL) 51.2%; ▌Tom Hagedorn (Ind.-Republican) 47.9%; ▌Clare H. Jarvis (Libertarian) 0.9%
Minnesota 2	Vin Weber; Redistricted from the 6th district	Independent- Republican	1980	Incumbent re-elected.	▌ ✓ Vin Weber (Ind.-Republican) 54.5%; ▌Jim Nichols (DFL) 45.5%
Minnesota 3	Bill Frenzel	Independent- Republican	1970	Incumbent re-elected.	▌ ✓ Bill Frenzel (Ind.-Republican) 72.2%; ▌Joel A. Saliterman (DFL) 26.4%; ▌Richard Laybourn (Citizens) 1.5%
Minnesota 4	Bruce Vento	DFL	1976	Incumbent re-elected.	▌ ✓ Bruce Vento (DFL) 73.2%; ▌Bill James (Ind.-Republican) 26.8%
Minnesota 5	Martin Olav Sabo	DFL	1978	Incumbent re-elected.	▌ ✓ Martin Olav Sabo (DFL) 65.5%; ▌Keith W. Johnson (Ind.-Republican) 29.4%; ▌Kathryn Anderson (Citizens) 3.9%; ▌Thomas Wicklund (Libertarian) 1.2%
Minnesota 6	Arlen Erdahl; Redistricted from the 1st district	Independent- Republican	1978	Incumbent lost re-election. DFL gain.	▌ ✓ Gerry Sikorski (DFL) 50.8%; ▌Arlen Erdahl (Ind.-Republican) 49.2%
Minnesota 7	Arlan Stangeland	Independent- Republican	1977 (special)	Incumbent re-elected.	▌ ✓ Arlan Stangeland (Ind.-Republican) 50.3%; ▌Gene R. Wenstrom (DFL) 49.7%
Minnesota 8	Jim Oberstar	DFL	1974	Incumbent re-elected.	▌ ✓ Jim Oberstar (DFL) 76.7%; ▌Marnie Luce (Ind.-Republican) 23.3%

== Mississippi ==
District	Incumbent			This race	
District	Member	Party	First elected	Results	Candidates
Mississippi 1	Jamie Whitten	Democratic	1941 (special)	Incumbent re-elected.	▌ ✓ Jamie Whitten (Democratic) 70.9%; ▌Fran Fawcett (Republican) 29.1%
Mississippi 2	David R. Bowen	Democratic	1972	Incumbent retired. Republican gain.	▌ ✓ Webb Franklin (Republican) 50.3%; ▌Robert G. Clark Jr. (Democratic) 48.4%; ▌William V. Harris (Independent) 1.3%
Mississippi 3	Sonny Montgomery	Democratic	1966	Incumbent re-elected.	▌ ✓ Sonny Montgomery (Democratic) 93.1%; ▌James Bradshaw (Independent) 6.9%
Mississippi 4	Wayne Dowdy	Democratic	1981 (special)	Incumbent re-elected.	▌ ✓ Wayne Dowdy (Democratic) 52.5%; ▌Liles Williams (Republican) 45.6%; ▌Eddie L. McBride (Independent) 1.8%
Mississippi 5	Trent Lott	Republican	1972	Incumbent re-elected.	▌ ✓ Trent Lott (Republican) 78.5%; ▌Blackie Coate (Democratic) 21.5%

== Missouri ==
Missouri lost one seat at reapportionment.

District	Incumbent			This race	
District	Member	Party	First elected	Results	Candidates
Missouri 1	Bill Clay	Democratic	1968	Incumbent re-elected.	▌ ✓ Bill Clay (Democratic) 66.1%; ▌Bill White (Republican) 33.9%
Missouri 2	Robert A. Young	Democratic	1976	Incumbent re-elected.	▌ ✓ Robert A. Young (Democratic) 56.5%; ▌Harold L. Dielmann (Republican) 43.5%
Missouri 3	Dick Gephardt	Democratic	1976	Incumbent re-elected.	▌ ✓ Dick Gephardt (Democratic) 77.9%; ▌Richard Foristel (Republican) 22.1%
Missouri 4	Ike Skelton	Democratic	1976	Incumbent re-elected.	▌ ✓ Ike Skelton (Democratic) 54.8%; ▌Wendell Bailey (Republican) 45.2%
Missouri 4	Wendell Bailey; Redistricted from the 8th district	Republican	1980	Incumbent lost re-election. Republican loss.	▌ ✓ Ike Skelton (Democratic) 54.8%; ▌Wendell Bailey (Republican) 45.2%
Missouri 5	Richard Bolling	Democratic	1948	Incumbent retired. Democratic hold.	▌ ✓ Alan Wheat (Democratic) 57.9%; ▌John A. Sharp (Republican) 40.2%; ▌Alan H. Deright (Independent) 1.3%; ▌Kathie A. Fitzgerald (Socialist Workers) 0.7%
Missouri 6	Tom Coleman	Republican	1976	Incumbent re-elected.	▌ ✓ Tom Coleman (Republican) 55.3%; ▌Jim Russell (Democratic) 44.7%
Missouri 7	Gene Taylor	Republican	1972	Incumbent re-elected.	▌ ✓ Gene Taylor (Republican) 50.5%; ▌David A. Geisler (Democratic) 49.5%
Missouri 8	Bill Emerson; Redistricted from the 10th district	Republican	1980	Incumbent re-elected.	▌ ✓ Bill Emerson (Republican) 53.1%; ▌Jerry Ford (Democratic) 46.9%
Missouri 9	Harold Volkmer	Democratic	1976	Incumbent re-elected.	▌ ✓ Harold Volkmer (Democratic) 60.8%; ▌Larry E. Mead (Republican) 39.2%

== Montana ==
District	Incumbent			This race	
District	Member	Party	First elected	Results	Candidates
Montana 1	Pat Williams	Democratic	1978	Incumbent re-elected.	▌ ✓ Pat Williams (Democratic) 59.7%; ▌Bob Davies (Republican) 37.2%; ▌Don Doig (Libertarian) 3.1%
Montana 2	Ron Marlenee	Republican	1976	Incumbent re-elected.	▌ ✓ Ron Marlenee (Republican) 53.7%; ▌Howard F. Lyman (Democratic) 44.2%; ▌Westley F. Deitchler (Libertarian) 2.1%

== Nebraska ==
District	Incumbent			This race	
District	Member	Party	First elected	Results	Candidates
Nebraska 1	Doug Bereuter	Republican	1978	Incumbent re-elected.	▌ ✓ Doug Bereuter (Republican) 75.1%; ▌Curt Donaldson (Democratic) 24.9%
Nebraska 2	Hal Daub	Republican	1980	Incumbent re-elected.	▌ ✓ Hal Daub (Republican) 56.8%; ▌Richard Fellman (Democratic) 43.2%
Nebraska 3	Virginia Smith	Republican	1974	Incumbent re-elected.	▌ ✓ Virginia Smith (Republican) 99.7%

== Nevada ==
District	Incumbent			This race	
District	Member	Party	First elected	Results	Candidates
Nevada 1	None (district created)			New seat. Democratic gain.	▌ ✓ Harry Reid (Democratic) 57.5%; ▌Peggy Cavnar (Republican) 42.5%
Nevada 2	James David Santini; Redistricted from the at-large district	Democratic	1974	Incumbent retired to run for U.S. Senator. Republican gain.	▌ ✓ Barbara Vucanovich (Republican) 55.5%; ▌Mary Gojack (Democratic) 41.3%; ▌Teresa Vuceta (Libertarian) 3.2%

== New Hampshire ==
District	Incumbent			This race	
District	Member	Party	First elected	Results	Candidates
New Hampshire 1	Norman D'Amours	Democratic	1974	Incumbent re-elected.	▌ ✓ Norman D'Amours (Democratic) 54.9%; ▌Bob Smith (Republican) 44.5%; ▌William C. Mackenzie (Independent) 0.5%
New Hampshire 2	Judd Gregg	Republican	1980	Incumbent re-elected.	▌ ✓ Judd Gregg (Republican) 70.8%; ▌Robert L. Dupay (Democratic) 29.2%

== New Jersey ==
New Jersey lost one seat at reapportionment.

District	Incumbent			This race	
District	Member	Party	First elected	Results	Candidates
New Jersey 1	James Florio	Democratic	1974	Incumbent re-elected.	▌ ✓ James Florio (Democratic) 73.3%; ▌John A. Dramesi (Republican) 26.2%; Others: ▌Jerry Zeldin (Libertarian) 0.3%; ▌Patrick J. McCann (Socialist) 0.2%
New Jersey 2	William J. Hughes	Democratic	1974	Incumbent re-elected.	▌ ✓ William J. Hughes (Democratic) 68.0%; ▌John J. Mahoney (Republican) 31.1%; ▌Bruce Powers (Libertarian) 0.8%
New Jersey 3	James J. Howard	Democratic	1964	Incumbent re-elected.	▌ ✓ James J. Howard (Democratic) 62.3%; ▌Marie Sheehan Muhler (Republican) 36.2%; Others: ▌John Kinnevy III (Citizens) 0.5%; ▌Lee A. Gesner Jr. (Libertarian) 0.4%; ▌Joseph B. Hawley (Independent) 0.3%; ▌Lawrence D. Erickson (Socialist Labor) 0.3%
New Jersey 4	Chris Smith	Republican	1980	Incumbent re-elected.	▌ ✓ Chris Smith (Republican) 52.7%; ▌Joseph P. Merlino (Democratic) 46.5%; Others: ▌Bill Harris (Libertarian) 0.4%; ▌Paul B. Rizzo (Independent) 0.2%; ▌Eugene Allen Creech (Independent) 0.1%
New Jersey 5	Marge Roukema; Redistricted from the 7th district	Republican	1980	Incumbent re-elected.	▌ ✓ Marge Roukema (Republican) 65.3%; ▌Fritz Cammerzell (Democratic) 33.5%; ▌William J. Zelko Jr. (Libertarian) 1.2%
New Jersey 6	Bernard J. Dwyer; Redistricted from the 15th district	Democratic	1980	Incumbent re-elected.	▌ ✓ Bernard J. Dwyer (Democratic) 68.1%; ▌Bertram L. Buckler (Republican) 31.3%; ▌Charles M. Hart (Libertarian) 0.6%
New Jersey 7	Matt Rinaldo; Redistricted from the 12th district	Republican	1972	Incumbent re-elected.	▌ ✓ Matt Rinaldo (Republican) 56.0%; ▌Adam K. Levin (Democratic) 43.3%; ▌Donald B. Siano (Libertarian) 0.8%
New Jersey 8	Robert A. Roe	Democratic	1970	Incumbent re-elected.	▌ ✓ Robert A. Roe (Democratic) 70.7%; ▌Norm Robertson (Republican) 28.5%; ▌Sidney J. Pope (Libertarian) 0.8%
New Jersey 9	Harold C. Hollenbeck	Republican	1976	Incumbent lost re-election. Democratic gain.	▌ ✓ Robert Torricelli (Democratic) 53.0%; ▌Harold C. Hollenbeck (Republican) 46.0%; ▌Robert Shapiro (Libertarian) 0.9%
New Jersey 10	Peter W. Rodino	Democratic	1948	Incumbent re-elected.	▌ ✓ Peter W. Rodino (Democratic) 82.6%; ▌Timothy Lee Jr. (Republican) 15.7%; Others: ▌Katharine Florentine (Libertarian) 1.0%; ▌Christine Keno (Independent) 0.7%
New Jersey 11	Joseph Minish	Democratic	1962	Incumbent re-elected.	▌ ✓ Joseph Minish (Democratic) 64.3%; ▌Rey Redington (Republican) 34.8%; ▌Richard S. Roth (Libertarian) 0.9%
New Jersey 12	Jim Courter; Redistricted from the 13th district	Republican	1978	Incumbent re-elected.	▌ ✓ Jim Courter (Republican) 66.8%; ▌Jeff Connor (Democratic) 32.3%; ▌Harold F. Leiendecker (Libertarian) 0.9%
New Jersey 12	Millicent Fenwick; Redistricted from the 5th district	Republican	1974	Incumbent retired to run for U.S. Senator. Republican loss.	▌ ✓ Jim Courter (Republican) 66.8%; ▌Jeff Connor (Democratic) 32.3%; ▌Harold F. Leiendecker (Libertarian) 0.9%
New Jersey 13	Edwin B. Forsythe; Redistricted from the 6th district	Republican	1970	Incumbent re-elected.	▌ ✓ Edwin B. Forsythe (Republican) 59.5%; ▌George S. Callas (Democratic) 39.1%; Others: ▌Paula Volpe (Citizens) 0.6%; ▌Leonard T. Flynn (Libertarian) 0.5%; ▌Donald L. Smith (Constitution) 0.4%
New Jersey 14	Frank Joseph Guarini	Democratic	1978	Incumbent re-elected.	▌ ✓ Frank Joseph Guarini (Democratic) 74.3%; ▌Charles J. Catrillo (Republican) 22.3%; ▌Jack Murphy (Independent) 1.3%; Others: ▌Herbert H. Shaw (Independent) 1.0%; ▌Kenneth Famularo (Independent) 0.7%; ▌Louis J. Sicilia (Libertarian) 0.4%

== New Mexico ==
District	Incumbent			This race	
District	Member	Party	First elected	Results	Candidates
New Mexico 1	Manuel Lujan Jr.	Republican	1968	Incumbent re-elected.	▌ ✓ Manuel Lujan Jr. (Republican) 52.4%; ▌Jan A. Hartke (Democratic) 47.6%
New Mexico 2	Joe Skeen	Republican	1980	Incumbent re-elected.	▌ ✓ Joe Skeen (Republican) 58.4%; ▌Caleb J. Chandler (Democratic) 41.6%
New Mexico 3	None (district created)			New seat. Democratic gain.	▌ ✓ Bill Richardson (Democratic) 64.5%; ▌Marjorie Bell Chambers (Republican) 35.4%

== New York ==
New York lost five seats at reapportionment.

District	Incumbent			This race	
District	Member	Party	First elected	Results	Candidates
New York 1	William Carney	Conservative	1978	Incumbent re-elected.	▌ ✓ William Carney (Conservative/Rep.) 63.9%; ▌Ethan C. Eldon (Democratic) 36.1%
New York 2	Thomas Downey	Democratic	1974	Incumbent re-elected.	▌ ✓ Thomas Downey (Democratic) 63.9%; ▌Paul G. Costello (Republican) 33.8%; ▌Louis VanDenEssen (Right to Life) 2.3%
New York 3	Gregory W. Carman	Republican	1980	Incumbent retired. Republican loss.	▌ ✓ Robert J. Mrazek (Democratic) 51.8%; ▌John LeBoutillier (Republican) 46.0%; ▌Richard T. Bohner (Right to Life) 2.2%
New York 3	John LeBoutillier; Redistricted from the 6th district	Republican	1980	Incumbent lost re-election. Democratic gain.	▌ ✓ Robert J. Mrazek (Democratic) 51.8%; ▌John LeBoutillier (Republican) 46.0%; ▌Richard T. Bohner (Right to Life) 2.2%
New York 4	Norman F. Lent	Republican	1970	Incumbent re-elected.	▌ ✓ Norman F. Lent (Republican) 60.4%; ▌Robert P. Zimmerman (Democratic) 36.4%; ▌John J. Dunkle (Right to Life) 3.3%
New York 5	Ray McGrath	Republican	1980	Incumbent re-elected.	▌ ✓ Ray McGrath (Republican) 58.1%; ▌Arnold J. Miller (Democratic) 38.8%; ▌Thomas J. Boyle (Right to Life) 2.8%; ▌Richard Horan (Libertarian) 0.3%
New York 6	Joseph P. Addabbo; Redistricted from the 7th district	Democratic	1960	Incumbent re-elected.	▌ ✓ Joseph P. Addabbo (Democratic) 95.9%; ▌Mark E. Scott (Conservative) 4.1%
New York 7	Benjamin S. Rosenthal; Redistricted from the 8th district	Democratic	1962	Incumbent re-elected.	▌ ✓ Benjamin S. Rosenthal (Democratic) 77.2%; ▌Albert Lemishow (Republican) 22.8%
New York 8	James H. Scheuer; Redistricted from the 11th district	Democratic	1964; 1972 (defeated); 1974	Incumbent re-elected.	▌ ✓ James H. Scheuer (Democratic) 89.5%; ▌John T. Blume (Conservative) 10.5%
New York 9	Geraldine Ferraro	Democratic	1978	Incumbent re-elected.	▌ ✓ Geraldine Ferraro (Democratic) 73.2%; ▌John J. Weigandt (Republican) 19.8%; ▌Ralph G. Groves (Conservative) 5.8%; ▌Patricia A. Salargo (Liberal) 1.1%
New York 10	Chuck Schumer; Redistricted from the 16th district	Democratic	1980	Incumbent re-elected.	▌ ✓ Chuck Schumer (Democratic) 79.2%; ▌Stephen Marks (Republican) 19.2%; ▌Alice J. Bertolotti (Right to Life) 1.7%
New York 11	Fred Richmond; Redistricted from the 14th district	Democratic	1974	Incumbent resigned. Democratic hold.	▌ ✓ Edolphus Towns (Democratic) 83.7%; ▌James W. Smith (Republican) 9.5%; ▌Patrick W. Giagnacova (Liberal) 3.2%; ▌Joseph N. O. Caesar (Conservative) 2.9%; ▌Susan C. Zarate (Socialist Workers) 0.8%
New York 12	Shirley Chisholm	Democratic	1968	Incumbent retired. Democratic hold.	▌ ✓ Major Owens (Democratic) 90.5%; ▌David Katan Sr. (Republican) 6.5%; ▌David E. Rosenstroch (Conservative) 2.0%; ▌Jahn-Clymer Francis (Right to Life) 0.9%
New York 13	Stephen Solarz	Democratic	1974	Incumbent re-elected.	▌ ✓ Stephen Solarz (Democratic) 80.5%; ▌Leon F. Nadrowski (Republican) 16.7%; ▌James M. Gay (Conservative) 2.7%
New York 14	Guy Molinari; Redistricted from the 17th district	Republican	1980	Incumbent re-elected.	▌ ✓ Guy Molinari (Republican) 56.1%; ▌Leo C. Zeferetti (Democratic) 42.9%; ▌Carl F. Grillo (Liberal) 1.1%
New York 14	Leo C. Zeferetti; Redistricted from the 15th district	Democratic	1974	Incumbent lost re-election. Democratic loss.	▌ ✓ Guy Molinari (Republican) 56.1%; ▌Leo C. Zeferetti (Democratic) 42.9%; ▌Carl F. Grillo (Liberal) 1.1%
New York 15	Bill Green; Redistricted from the 18th district	Republican	1978	Incumbent re-elected.	▌ ✓ Bill Green (Republican) 53.6%; ▌Betty G. Lall (Democratic) 44.9%; ▌Henry Van Rossem (Conservative) 1.6%
New York 16	Charles Rangel; Redistricted from the 19th district	Democratic	1970	Incumbent re-elected.	▌ ✓ Charles Rangel (Democratic) 97.5%; ▌Michael T. Berns (Conservative) 1.6%; ▌Veronica Cruz (Socialist Workers) 0.9%
New York 17	Ted Weiss; Redistricted from the 20th district	Democratic	1976	Incumbent re-elected.	▌ ✓ Ted Weiss (Democratic) 85.0%; ▌Louis S. Antonelli (Republican) 15.0%
New York 17	Jonathan Brewster Bingham; Redistricted from the 22nd district	Democratic	1964	Incumbent retired. Democratic loss.	▌ ✓ Ted Weiss (Democratic) 85.0%; ▌Louis S. Antonelli (Republican) 15.0%
New York 18	Robert Garcia; Redistricted from the 21st district	Democratic	1978	Incumbent re-elected.	▌ ✓ Robert Garcia (Democratic) 98.9%; ▌Loidis R. Cordero (Popular) 1.1%
New York 19	Mario Biaggi; Redistricted from the 10th district	Democratic	1968	Incumbent re-elected.	▌ ✓ Mario Biaggi (Democratic) 93.7%; ▌Michael J. McSherry (Conservative) 5.9%; ▌Eva Chertov (Socialist Workers) 0.5%
New York 20	Richard Ottinger; Redistricted from the 24th district	Democratic	1964; 1970 (retired); 1974	Incumbent re-elected.	▌ ✓ Richard Ottinger (Democratic) 56.5%; ▌Jon S. Fossel (Republican) 41.3%; ▌Florence T. O'Grady (Right to Life) 2.2%
New York 21	Hamilton Fish IV; Redistricted from the 25th district	Republican	1968	Incumbent re-elected.	▌ ✓ Hamilton Fish IV (Republican) 75.2%; ▌J. Morgan Strong (Democratic) 24.8%
New York 22	Benjamin Gilman; Redistricted from the 26th district	Republican	1972	Incumbent re-elected.	▌ ✓ Benjamin Gilman (Republican) 52.9%; ▌Peter A. Peyser (Democratic) 42.0%; ▌Charles C. Beck (Conservative) 2.8%; ▌Richard Bruno (Right to Life) 2.3%
New York 22	Peter A. Peyser; Redistricted from the 23rd district	Democratic	1970; 1976 (retired); 1978	Incumbent lost re-election. Democratic loss.	▌ ✓ Benjamin Gilman (Republican) 52.9%; ▌Peter A. Peyser (Democratic) 42.0%; ▌Charles C. Beck (Conservative) 2.8%; ▌Richard Bruno (Right to Life) 2.3%
New York 23	Samuel S. Stratton; Redistricted from the 28th district	Democratic	1958	Incumbent re-elected.	▌ ✓ Samuel S. Stratton (Democratic) 76.1%; ▌Frank Wicks (Republican) 19.2%; ▌John G. Dow (Liberal) 3.9%; Others: ▌Mark A. Dunlea (Citizens) 0.5%; ▌Patricia Mayberry (Socialist Workers) 0.3%
New York 24	Gerald Solomon; Redistricted from the 29th district	Republican	1978	Incumbent re-elected.	▌ ✓ Gerald Solomon (Republican) 73.9%; ▌Roy Esiason (Democratic) 26.1%
New York 25	Donald J. Mitchell; Redistricted from the 31st district	Republican	1972	Incumbent retired. Republican hold.	▌ ✓ Sherwood Boehlert (Republican) 55.8%; ▌Anita Maxwell (Democratic) 42.4%; ▌Donald J. Thomas (Right to Life) 1.8%
New York 26	David O'Brien Martin; Redistricted from the 30th district	Republican	1980	Incumbent re-elected.	▌ ✓ David O'Brien Martin (Republican) 71.6%; ▌David P. Landy (Democratic) 28.4%
New York 27	George C. Wortley; Redistricted from the 32nd district	Republican	1980	Incumbent re-elected.	▌ ✓ George C. Wortley (Republican) 53.2%; ▌Elaine Lytel (Democratic) 44.2%; ▌Thomas M. Hunter (Conservative) 1.6%; ▌George Hyrcza (Right to Life) 1.1%
New York 27	Gary A. Lee; Redistricted from the 33rd district	Republican	1978	Incumbent lost renomination. Republican loss.	▌ ✓ George C. Wortley (Republican) 53.2%; ▌Elaine Lytel (Democratic) 44.2%; ▌Thomas M. Hunter (Conservative) 1.6%; ▌George Hyrcza (Right to Life) 1.1%
New York 28	Matt McHugh; Redistricted from the 27th district	Democratic	1974	Incumbent re-elected.	▌ ✓ Matt McHugh (Democratic) 56.3%; ▌David F. Crowley (Republican) 42.5%; ▌Mark R. Masterson (Right to Life) 1.1%
New York 29	Frank Horton; Redistricted from the 34th district	Republican	1962	Incumbent re-elected.	▌ ✓ Frank Horton (Republican) 66.4%; ▌William C. Larsen (Democratic) 30.2%; ▌Edwin Lundberg (Conservative) 3.4%
New York 30	Barber Conable; Redistricted from the 35th district	Republican	1964	Incumbent re-elected.	▌ ✓ Barber Conable (Republican) 68.2%; ▌Bill Benet (Democratic) 27.9%; ▌Richard G. Baxter (Conservative) 2.2%; ▌David J. Valone (Right to Life) 1.7%
New York 31	Jack Kemp; Redistricted from the 38th district	Republican	1970	Incumbent re-elected.	▌ ✓ Jack Kemp (Republican) 75.3%; ▌James A. Martin (Democratic) 24.7%
New York 32	John LaFalce; Redistricted from the 36th district	Democratic	1974	Incumbent re-elected.	▌ ✓ John LaFalce (Democratic) 91.4%; ▌Raymond R. Walker (Conservative) 6.8%; ▌Timothy J. Hubbard (Right to Life) 1.9%
New York 33	Henry J. Nowak; Redistricted from the 37th district	Democratic	1974	Incumbent re-elected.	▌ ✓ Henry J. Nowak (Democratic) 84.1%; ▌Walter J. Pillich (Republican) 13.2%; ▌James F. Gallagher (Right to Life) 2.7%
New York 34	Stan Lundine; Redistricted from the 39th district	Democratic	1976	Incumbent re-elected.	▌ ✓ Stan Lundine (Democratic) 60.2%; ▌James J. Snyder (Republican) 38.7%; ▌Genevieve F. Ronan (Right to Life) 1.1%

== North Carolina ==
District	Incumbent			This race	
District	Member	Party	First elected	Results	Candidates
North Carolina 1	Walter B. Jones Sr.	Democratic	1966	Incumbent re-elected.	▌ ✓ Walter B. Jones Sr. (Democratic) 81.3%; ▌James F. McIntyre III (Republican) 17.8%; ▌Bobby Yates Emory (Libertarian) 0.9%
North Carolina 2	Lawrence H. Fountain	Democratic	1952	Incumbent retired. Democratic hold.	▌ ✓ Tim Valentine (Democratic) 53.6%; ▌John W. Marin (Republican) 30.8%; ▌H. M. Michaux Jr. (Write-in) 14.4%; ▌Sue Lamm (Libertarian) 1.3%
North Carolina 3	Charles Orville Whitley	Democratic	1976	Incumbent re-elected.	▌ ✓ Charles Orville Whitley (Democratic) 63.6%; ▌Eugene McDaniel (Republican) 36.0%; ▌Marshall Sprague (Libertarian) 0.5%
North Carolina 4	Ike Franklin Andrews	Democratic	1972	Incumbent re-elected.	▌ ✓ Ike Franklin Andrews (Democratic) 51.3%; ▌Bill Cobey (Republican) 47.4%; ▌Fritz Prochnow (Libertarian) 1.3%
North Carolina 5	Stephen L. Neal	Democratic	1974	Incumbent re-elected.	▌ ✓ Stephen L. Neal (Democratic) 60.3%; ▌Anne Bagnal (Republican) 39.2%; Others: ▌Naudeen Beek (Libertarian) 0.4%; ▌Meryl Lynn Farber (Socialist Workers) 0.1%
North Carolina 6	Gene Johnston	Republican	1980	Incumbent lost re-election. Democratic gain.	▌ ✓ Charles Robin Britt (Democratic) 53.8%; ▌Gene Johnston (Republican) 45.6%; ▌J. Erik Christensen (Libertarian) 0.5%
North Carolina 7	Charlie Rose	Democratic	1972	Incumbent re-elected.	▌ ✓ Charlie Rose (Democratic) 71.0%; ▌Edward Johnson (Republican) 28.0%; ▌Richard Hollembeak (Libertarian) 1.0%
North Carolina 8	Bill Hefner	Democratic	1974	Incumbent re-elected.	▌ ✓ Bill Hefner (Democratic) 57.4%; ▌Harris D. Blake (Republican) 42.0%; ▌Don Scoggins (Libertarian) 0.7%
North Carolina 9	James G. Martin	Republican	1972	Incumbent re-elected.	▌ ✓ James G. Martin (Republican) 57.0%; ▌Preston Cornelius (Democratic) 41.9%; ▌Dave Braatz (Libertarian) 1.1%
North Carolina 10	Jim Broyhill	Republican	1962	Incumbent re-elected.	▌ ✓ Jim Broyhill (Republican) 92.7%; ▌John Rankin (Libertarian) 7.3%
North Carolina 11	Bill Hendon	Republican	1980	Incumbent lost re-election. Democratic gain.	▌ ✓ James M. Clarke (Democratic) 49.9%; ▌Bill Hendon (Republican) 49.2%; ▌Linda Janca (Libertarian) 0.9%

== North Dakota ==
District	Incumbent			This race	
District	Member	Party	First elected	Results	Candidates
North Dakota at-large	Byron Dorgan	Democratic-NPL	1980	Incumbent re-elected.	▌ ✓ Byron Dorgan (Democratic-NPL) 71.6%; ▌Kent Jones (Republican) 27.7%; ▌Don J. Klingensmith (Prohibition) 0.7%

== Ohio ==
Ohio lost two seats at reapportionment.

District	Incumbent			This race	
District	Member	Party	First elected	Results	Candidates
Ohio 1	Tom Luken; Redistricted from the 2nd district	Democratic	1974 (special); 1974 (lost); 1976	Incumbent re-elected.	▌ ✓ Tom Luken (Democratic) 63.5%; ▌John E. Held (Republican) 33.7%; ▌James A. Berns (Libertarian) 2.8%
Ohio 2	Bill Gradison; Redistricted from the 1st district	Republican	1974	Incumbent re-elected.	▌ ✓ Bill Gradison (Republican) 62.7%; ▌William J. Luttmer (Democratic) 34.2%; ▌Charles K. Shrout Jr. (Libertarian) 1.9%; ▌Joseph I. Lombardo (Independent) 1.2%
Ohio 3	Tony P. Hall	Democratic	1978	Incumbent re-elected.	▌ ✓ Tony P. Hall (Democratic) 87.7%; ▌Kathryn E. Brown (Libertarian) 12.3%
Ohio 4	Mike Oxley	Republican	1972	Incumbent re-elected.	▌ ✓ Mike Oxley (Republican) 64.6%; ▌Bob Moon (Democratic) 35.4%
Ohio 5	Del Latta	Republican	1958	Incumbent re-elected.	▌ ✓ Del Latta (Republican) 55.2%; ▌James R. Sherck (Democratic) 44.8%
Ohio 6	Bob McEwen	Republican	1980	Incumbent re-elected.	▌ ✓ Bob McEwen (Republican) 59.2%; ▌Lynn Alan Grimshaw (Democratic) 40.8%
Ohio 7	Bud Brown	Republican	1965	Incumbent retired to run for Governor of Ohio. Republican hold.	▌ ✓ Mike DeWine (Republican) 56.3%; ▌Roger D. Tackett (Democratic) 42.0%; ▌John B. Winer (Libertarian) 1.8%
Ohio 8	Tom Kindness	Republican	1974	Incumbent re-elected.	▌ ✓ Tom Kindness (Republican) 66.4%; ▌John W. Griffin (Democratic) 33.6%
Ohio 9	Ed Weber	Republican	1980	Incumbent lost re-election. Democratic gain.	▌ ✓ Marcy Kaptur (Democratic) 57.9%; ▌Ed Weber (Republican) 39.3%; ▌Susan A. Skinner (Independent) 1.1%; Others: ▌James J. Somers (Independent) 1.0%; ▌David Muir (Libertarian) 0.7%
Ohio 10	Clarence E. Miller	Republican	1966	Incumbent re-elected.	▌ ✓ Clarence E. Miller (Republican) 63.3%; ▌John M. Buchanan (Democratic) 36.7%
Ohio 10	Jean Spencer Ashbrook; Redistricted from the 17th district	Republican	1982	Incumbent retired. Republican loss.	▌ ✓ Clarence E. Miller (Republican) 63.3%; ▌John M. Buchanan (Democratic) 36.7%
Ohio 11	J. William Stanton	Republican	1964	Incumbent retired. Republican loss.	▌ ✓ Dennis E. Eckart (Democratic) 60.9%; ▌Glen W. Warner (Republican) 36.9%; ▌Jim Russell (Libertarian) 2.2%
Ohio 11	Dennis E. Eckart; Redistricted from the 22nd district	Democratic	1980	Incumbent re-elected.	▌ ✓ Dennis E. Eckart (Democratic) 60.9%; ▌Glen W. Warner (Republican) 36.9%; ▌Jim Russell (Libertarian) 2.2%
Ohio 12	Bob Shamansky	Democratic	1980	Incumbent lost re-election. Republican gain.	▌ ✓ John Kasich (Republican) 50.5%; ▌Bob Shamansky (Democratic) 47.3%; ▌Russell A. Lewis (Libertarian) 2.3%
Ohio 13	Don Pease	Democratic	1976	Incumbent re-elected.	▌ ✓ Don Pease (Democratic) 61.2%; ▌Timothy Paul Martin (Republican) 35.4%; ▌James S. Patton (Independent) 3.4%
Ohio 14	John F. Seiberling	Democratic	1970	Incumbent re-elected.	▌ ✓ John F. Seiberling (Democratic) 70.5%; ▌Louis A. Mangels (Republican) 29.5%
Ohio 15	Chalmers Wylie	Republican	1966	Incumbent re-elected.	▌ ✓ Chalmers Wylie (Republican) 66.3%; ▌Greg Kostelac (Democratic) 29.8%; ▌Steve Kender (Libertarian) 3.9%
Ohio 16	Ralph Regula	Republican	1972	Incumbent re-elected.	▌ ✓ Ralph Regula (Republican) 65.8%; ▌Jeffrey R. Orenstein (Democratic) 34.2%
Ohio 17	Lyle Williams; Redistricted from the 19th district	Republican	1978	Incumbent re-elected.	▌ ✓ Lyle Williams (Republican) 55.1%; ▌George D. Tablack (Democratic) 44.9%
Ohio 18	Douglas Applegate	Democratic	1976	Incumbent re-elected.	▌ ✓ Douglas Applegate (Democratic) 100%
Ohio 19	Ronald M. Mottl; Redistricted from the 23rd district	Democratic	1974	Incumbent lost renomination. Democratic hold.	▌ ✓ Ed Feighan (Democratic) 58.8%; ▌Richard G. Anter II (Republican) 38.3%; ▌Thomas Pekarek (Libertarian) 1.6%; ▌Kevin G. Killeeen (Independent) 1.2%
Ohio 20	Mary Rose Oakar	Democratic	1976	Incumbent re-elected.	▌ ✓ Mary Rose Oakar (Democratic) 85.6%; ▌Paris T. LeJeune (Republican) 11.3%; ▌Milton R. Norris (Libertarian) 1.8%; ▌Louise Haberbush (Independent) 1.2%
Ohio 21	Louis Stokes	Democratic	1968	Incumbent re-elected.	▌ ✓ Louis Stokes (Democratic) 86.1%; ▌Alan G. Shatteen (Republican) 13.9%

== Oklahoma ==
District	Incumbent			This race	
District	Member	Party	First elected	Results	Candidates
Oklahoma 1	James R. Jones	Democratic	1972	Incumbent re-elected.	▌ ✓ James R. Jones (Democratic) 54.1%; ▌Dick Freeman (Republican) 45.9%
Oklahoma 2	Mike Synar	Democratic	1978	Incumbent re-elected.	▌ ✓ Mike Synar (Democratic) 72.6%; ▌Lou Striegel (Republican) 27.4%
Oklahoma 3	Wes Watkins	Democratic	1976	Incumbent re-elected.	▌ ✓ Wes Watkins (Democratic) 82.2%; ▌Patrick K. Miller (Republican) 17.8%
Oklahoma 4	Dave McCurdy	Democratic	1980	Incumbent re-elected.	▌ ✓ Dave McCurdy (Democratic) 65.0%; ▌Howard Rutledge (Republican) 34.2%; Others: ▌Charles T. Emerson (Independent) 0.4%; ▌Marshall A. Luse Jr. (Independent) 0.3%
Oklahoma 5	Mickey Edwards	Republican	1976	Incumbent re-elected.	▌ ✓ Mickey Edwards (Republican) 67.2%; ▌Dan Lane (Democratic) 28.8%; ▌Paul E. Trent (Independent) 3.9%
Oklahoma 6	Glenn English	Democratic	1974	Incumbent re-elected.	▌ ✓ Glenn English (Democratic) 75.4%; ▌Ed Moore (Republican) 24.6%

== Oregon ==
District	Incumbent			This race	
District	Member	Party	First elected	Results	Candidates
Oregon 1	Les AuCoin	Democratic	1974	Incumbent re-elected.	▌ ✓ Les AuCoin (Democratic) 53.8%; ▌Bill Moshofsky (Republican) 46.2%
Oregon 2	None (district created)			New seat. Republican gain.	▌ ✓ Bob Smith (Republican) 55.6%; ▌Larryann Willis (Democratic) 44.4%
Oregon 3	Ron Wyden	Democratic	1980	Incumbent re-elected.	▌ ✓ Ron Wyden (Democratic) 78.3%; ▌Thomas H. Phelan (Republican) 21.7%
Oregon 4	Jim Weaver	Democratic	1974	Incumbent re-elected.	▌ ✓ Jim Weaver (Democratic) 59.1%; ▌Ross Anthony (Republican) 40.9%
Oregon 5	Denny Smith; Redistricted from the 2nd district	Republican	1980	Incumbent re-elected.	▌ ✓ Denny Smith (Republican) 51.2%; ▌Ruth McFarland (Democratic) 48.8%

== Pennsylvania ==
Pennsylvania lost two seats at reapportionment.

District	Incumbent			This race	
District	Member	Party	First elected	Results	Candidates
Pennsylvania 1	Thomas M. Foglietta	Democratic	1980	Incumbent re-elected.	▌ ✓ Thomas M. Foglietta (Democratic) 72.3%; ▌Michael Marino (Republican) 26.6%; Others: ▌Lisa Brannan (Consumer) 0.7%; ▌Ralph Mullinger (Libertarian) 0.4%
Pennsylvania 1	Joseph F. Smith; Redistricted from the 3rd district	Democratic	1981 (special)	Incumbent lost renomination. Democratic loss.	▌ ✓ Thomas M. Foglietta (Democratic) 72.3%; ▌Michael Marino (Republican) 26.6%; Others: ▌Lisa Brannan (Consumer) 0.7%; ▌Ralph Mullinger (Libertarian) 0.4%
Pennsylvania 2	William H. Gray III	Democratic	1978	Incumbent re-elected.	▌ ✓ William H. Gray III (Democratic) 76.1%; ▌Milton Street (Independent) 22.2%; ▌William C. Saunders (Libertarian) 1.7%
Pennsylvania 3	Charles F. Dougherty; Redistricted from the 4th district	Republican	1978	Incumbent lost re-election. Democratic gain.	▌ ✓ Robert Borski (Democratic) 50.1%; ▌Charles F. Dougherty (Republican) 48.7%; Others: ▌Carolyn Berger (Consumer) 0.5%; ▌Mike Finley (Socialist Workers) 0.5%; ▌Bruce Bishkin (Libertarian) 0.2%
Pennsylvania 4	Eugene Atkinson; Redistricted from the 25th district	Republican	1978	Incumbent lost re-election. Democratic gain.	▌ ✓ Joe Kolter (Democratic) 60.1%; ▌Eugene Atkinson (Republican) 38.6%; ▌Sam Blancato (Consumer) 1.2%
Pennsylvania 5	Dick Schulze	Republican	1974	Incumbent re-elected.	▌ ✓ Dick Schulze (Republican) 67.2%; ▌Bob Burger (Democratic) 32.8%
Pennsylvania 6	Gus Yatron	Democratic	1968	Incumbent re-elected.	▌ ✓ Gus Yatron (Democratic) 72.0%; ▌Harry B. Martin (Republican) 28.0%
Pennsylvania 7	Bob Edgar	Democratic	1974	Incumbent re-elected.	▌ ✓ Bob Edgar (Democratic) 55.4%; ▌Steve Joachim (Republican) 44.6%
Pennsylvania 8	James K. Coyne III	Republican	1980	Incumbent lost re-election. Democratic gain.	▌ ✓ Peter H. Kostmayer (Democratic) 50.3%; ▌James K. Coyne III (Republican) 48.9%; Others: ▌Albert H. Reef (Independent) 0.5%; ▌Hans Schroeder (Libertarian) 0.3%
Pennsylvania 9	Bud Shuster	Republican	1972	Incumbent re-elected.	▌ ✓ Bud Shuster (Republican) 65.1%; ▌Eugene J. Duncan (Democratic) 34.9%
Pennsylvania 10	Joseph M. McDade	Republican	1962	Incumbent re-elected.	▌ ✓ Joseph M. McDade (Republican) 67.5%; ▌Robert J. Rafalko (Democratic) 32.5%
Pennsylvania 11	Jim Nelligan	Republican	1980	Incumbent lost re-election. Democratic gain.	▌ ✓ Frank Harrison (Democratic) 53.5%; ▌Jim Nelligan (Republican) 46.5%
Pennsylvania 12	John Murtha	Democratic	1974	Incumbent re-elected.	▌ ✓ John Murtha (Democratic) 61.1%; ▌William N. Tuscano (Republican) 34.4%; ▌Joseph E. Krill (Independent) 4.5%
Pennsylvania 12	Donald A. Bailey; Redistricted from the 21st district	Democratic	1978	Incumbent lost renomination. Democratic loss.	▌ ✓ John Murtha (Democratic) 61.1%; ▌William N. Tuscano (Republican) 34.4%; ▌Joseph E. Krill (Independent) 4.5%
Pennsylvania 13	Lawrence Coughlin	Republican	1968	Incumbent re-elected.	▌ ✓ Lawrence Coughlin (Republican) 64.3%; ▌Martin J. Cunningham (Democratic) 35.2%; ▌Nicholas Kydonieus (Libertarian) 0.5%
Pennsylvania 14	William J. Coyne	Democratic	1980	Incumbent re-elected.	▌ ✓ William J. Coyne (Democratic) 74.9%; ▌John Robert Clark (Republican) 20.3%; ▌Richard Edward Caligiuri (Libertarian) 3.4%; ▌William R. Kalman (Socialist Workers) 1.5%
Pennsylvania 15	Don Ritter	Republican	1978	Incumbent re-elected.	▌ ✓ Don Ritter (Republican) 57.8%; ▌Richard J. Orloski (Democratic) 42.2%
Pennsylvania 16	Bob Walker	Republican	1976	Incumbent re-elected.	▌ ✓ Bob Walker (Republican) 71.3%; ▌Jean D. Mowery (Democratic) 28.7%
Pennsylvania 17	Allen E. Ertel	Democratic	1976	Incumbent retired to run for Governor of Pennsylvania. Republican gain.	▌ ✓ George Gekas (Republican) 57.6%; ▌Larry Hochendoner (Democratic) 42.4%
Pennsylvania 18	Doug Walgren	Democratic	1976	Incumbent re-elected.	▌ ✓ Doug Walgren (Democratic) 54.2%; ▌Ted Jacob (Republican) 45.0%; ▌William A. Lewis Jr. (Libertarian) 0.8%
Pennsylvania 19	Bill Goodling	Republican	1974	Incumbent re-elected.	▌ ✓ Bill Goodling (Republican) 70.8%; ▌Larry Becker (Democratic) 29.2%
Pennsylvania 20	Joseph M. Gaydos	Democratic	1968	Incumbent re-elected.	▌ ✓ Joseph M. Gaydos (Democratic) 76.0%; ▌Terry T. Ray (Republican) 22.8%; ▌David L. Travis (Libertarian) 1.2%
Pennsylvania 21	Marc L. Marks; Redistricted from the 24th district	Republican	1976	Incumbent retired. Republican hold.	▌ ✓ Tom Ridge (Republican) 50.2%; ▌Anthony Andrezeski (Democratic) 49.8%
Pennsylvania 22	Austin Murphy	Democratic	1976	Incumbent re-elected.	▌ ✓ Austin Murphy (Democratic) 78.7%; ▌Frank J. Paterra (Republican) 20.5%; ▌Deann Rathbun (Socialist Workers) 0.8%
Pennsylvania 23	William Clinger	Republican	1978	Incumbent re-elected.	▌ ✓ William Clinger (Republican) 65.2%; ▌Joseph J. Calla Jr. (Democratic) 34.8%

== Rhode Island ==
District	Incumbent			This race	
District	Member	Party	First elected	Results	Candidates
Rhode Island 1	Fernand St Germain	Democratic	1960	Incumbent re-elected.	▌ ✓ Fernand St Germain (Democratic) 60.7%; ▌Burton Stallwood (Republican) 38.3%; ▌Gertrude M. Jayne Fowler (Independent) 1.0%
Rhode Island 2	Claudine Schneider	Republican	1980	Incumbent re-elected.	▌ ✓ Claudine Schneider (Republican) 55.6%; ▌James V. Aukerman (Democratic) 44.4%

== South Carolina ==
District	Incumbent			This race	
District	Member	Party	First elected	Results	Candidates
South Carolina 1	Tommy Hartnett	Republican	1980	Incumbent re-elected.	▌ ✓ Tommy Hartnett (Republican) 54.3%; ▌W. Mullins McLeod (Democratic) 44.9%; ▌Walter E. Smith (Libertarian) 0.8%
South Carolina 2	Floyd Spence	Republican	1970	Incumbent re-elected.	▌ ✓ Floyd Spence (Republican) 58.5%; ▌Ken Mosely (Democratic) 41.5%
South Carolina 3	Butler Derrick	Democratic	1974	Incumbent re-elected.	▌ ✓ Butler Derrick (Democratic) 90.4%; ▌Gordon T. Davis (Libertarian) 9.6%
South Carolina 4	Carroll A. Campbell Jr.	Republican	1978	Incumbent re-elected.	▌ ✓ Carroll A. Campbell Jr. (Republican) 63.3%; ▌Marion E. Tyus (Democratic) 36.7%
South Carolina 5	Kenneth Lamar Holland	Democratic	1974	Incumbent retired. Democratic hold.	▌ ✓ John Spratt (Democratic) 67.6%; ▌John S. Wilkerson (Republican) 32.4%
South Carolina 6	John Light Napier	Republican	1980	Incumbent lost re-election. Democratic gain.	▌ ✓ Robin Tallon (Democratic) 52.5%; ▌John Light Napier (Republican) 47.5%

== South Dakota ==
District	Incumbent			This race	
District	Member	Party	First elected	Results	Candidates
South Dakota at-large	Tom Daschle; Redistricted from the 1st district	Democratic	1978	Incumbent re-elected.	▌ ✓ Tom Daschle (Democratic) 51.6%; ▌Clint Roberts (Republican) 48.4%
South Dakota at-large	Clint Roberts; Redistricted from the 2nd district	Republican	1980	Incumbent lost re-election. Republican loss.	▌ ✓ Tom Daschle (Democratic) 51.6%; ▌Clint Roberts (Republican) 48.4%

== Tennessee ==
District	Incumbent			This race	
District	Member	Party	First elected	Results	Candidates
Tennessee 1	Jimmy Quillen	Republican	1962	Incumbent re-elected.	▌ ✓ Jimmy Quillen (Republican) 74.1%; ▌Jessie J. Cable (Democratic) 22.8%; ▌James B. Fields (Independent) 3.1%
Tennessee 2	John Duncan Sr.	Republican	1964	Incumbent re-elected.	▌ ✓ John Duncan Sr. (Republican) 100%
Tennessee 3	Marilyn Lloyd	Democratic	1974	Incumbent re-elected.	▌ ✓ Marilyn Lloyd (Democratic) 61.8%; ▌Glen Byers (Republican) 36.3%; ▌Henry Ford Brock (Independent) 1.9%
Tennessee 4	None (district created)			New seat. Democratic gain.	▌ ✓ Jim Cooper (Democratic) 66.1%; ▌Cissy Baker (Republican) 33.9%
Tennessee 5	Bill Boner	Democratic	1978	Incumbent re-elected.	▌ ✓ Bill Boner (Democratic) 80.2%; ▌Laurel Steinhice (Republican) 19.8%
Tennessee 6	Al Gore; Redistricted from the 4th district	Democratic	1976	Incumbent re-elected.	▌ ✓ Al Gore (Democratic) 100%
Tennessee 7	Robin Beard; Redistricted from the 6th district	Republican	1972	Incumbent retired to run for U.S. Senator. Republican hold.	▌ ✓ Don Sundquist (Republican) 50.5%; ▌Bob Clement (Democratic) 49.5%
Tennessee 8	Ed Jones; Redistricted from the 7th district	Democratic	1969 (special)	Incumbent re-elected.	▌ ✓ Ed Jones (Democratic) 74.9%; ▌Bruce Benson (Republican) 25.1%
Tennessee 9	Harold Ford Sr. Redistricted from the 8th district	Democratic	1974	Incumbent re-elected.	▌ ✓ Harold Ford Sr. (Democratic) 72.4%; ▌Joe Crawford (Republican) 26.4%; ▌Isaac Richmond (Independent) 1.2%

== Texas ==
District	Incumbent			This race	
District	Member	Party	First elected	Results	Candidates
Texas 1	Sam B. Hall Jr.	Democratic	1976	Incumbent re-elected.	▌ ✓ Sam B. Hall Jr. (Democratic) 97.5%; ▌John Traylor (Libertarian) 2.5%
Texas 2	Charlie Wilson	Democratic	1972	Incumbent re-elected.	▌ ✓ Charlie Wilson (Democratic) 94.3%; ▌Ed Richbourg (Libertarian) 5.7%
Texas 3	James M. Collins	Republican	1968	Incumbent retired to run for U.S. Senator. Republican hold.	▌ ✓ Steve Bartlett (Republican) 77.1%; ▌Jim McNees (Democratic) 21.8%; ▌Jerry R. Williamson (Libertarian) 1.1%
Texas 4	Ralph Hall	Democratic	1980	Incumbent re-elected.	▌ ✓ Ralph Hall (Democratic) 73.8%; ▌Pete Collumb (Republican) 25.3%; ▌Bruce Iiams (Libertarian) 0.9%
Texas 5	Jim Mattox	Democratic	1976	Incumbent retired to run for Attorney General; Democratic hold.	▌ ✓ John Bryant (Democratic) 64.8%; ▌Joe Devany (Republican) 33.7%; Others: ▌Richard Squire (Libertarian) 0.9%; ▌John Richard Bridges (Citizens) 0.6%
Texas 6	Phil Gramm	Democratic	1978	Incumbent re-elected.	▌ ✓ Phil Gramm (Democratic) 94.5%; ▌Ron Hard (Libertarian) 5.5%
Texas 7	Bill Archer	Republican	1970	Incumbent re-elected.	▌ ✓ Bill Archer (Republican) 85.0%; ▌Dennis G. Scoggins (Democratic) 14.0%; ▌Bill Ware (Libertarian) 1.0%
Texas 8	Jack Fields	Republican	1980	Incumbent re-elected.	▌ ✓ Jack Fields (Republican) 56.7%; ▌Henry E. Allee (Democratic) 42.6%; ▌Mike Angwin (Libertarian) 0.6%
Texas 9	Jack Brooks	Democratic	1952	Incumbent re-elected.	▌ ✓ Jack Brooks (Democratic) 67.6%; ▌John W. Lewis (Republican) 30.3%; ▌Dean Allen (Libertarian) 2.1%
Texas 10	J. J. Pickle	Democratic	1963 (special)	Incumbent re-elected.	▌ ✓ J. J. Pickle (Democratic) 90.1%; ▌William G. Kelsey (Libertarian) 6.5%; ▌Bradley Louis Rockwell (Citizens) 3.4%
Texas 11	Marvin Leath	Democratic	1978	Incumbent re-elected.	▌ ✓ Marvin Leath (Democratic) 96.4%; ▌Thomas B. Kilbride (Libertarian) 3.6%
Texas 12	Jim Wright	Democratic	1954	Incumbent re-elected.	▌ ✓ Jim Wright (Democratic) 68.9%; ▌Jim Ryan (Republican) 30.5%; ▌Edward Olson (Libertarian) 0.6%
Texas 13	Jack Hightower	Democratic	1974	Incumbent re-elected.	▌ ✓ Jack Hightower (Democratic) 63.6%; ▌Ron Slover (Republican) 35.3%; ▌Rod Collier (Libertarian) 1.2%
Texas 14	Bill Patman	Democratic	1980	Incumbent re-elected.	▌ ✓ Bill Patman (Democratic) 60.7%; ▌Joe Wyatt Jr. (Republican) 38.6%; ▌Glenn Rasmussen (Libertarian) 0.7%
Texas 15	Kika de la Garza	Democratic	1964	Incumbent re-elected.	▌ ✓ Kika de la Garza (Democratic) 95.7%; ▌Frank L. Jones III (Libertarian) 4.3%
Texas 16	Richard Crawford White	Democratic	1964	Incumbent retired. Democratic hold.	▌ ✓ Ron Coleman (Democratic) 53.9%; ▌Pat Haggerty (Republican) 44.2%; ▌Catherine A. McDivitt (Libertarian) 1.9%
Texas 17	Charles Stenholm	Democratic	1978	Incumbent re-elected.	▌ ✓ Charles Stenholm (Democratic) 97.1%; ▌James A. Cooley II (Libertarian) 2.9%
Texas 18	Mickey Leland	Democratic	1978	Incumbent re-elected.	▌ ✓ Mickey Leland (Democratic) 82.6%; ▌C. Leon Pickett (Republican) 14.7%; ▌Thomas P. Bernhardt (Libertarian) 2.7%
Texas 19	Kent Hance	Democratic	1978	Incumbent re-elected.	▌ ✓ Kent Hance (Democratic) 81.6%; ▌E. L. Hicks (Republican) 17.3%; ▌Mike Read (Libertarian) 1.1%
Texas 20	Henry B. González	Democratic	1961 (special)	Incumbent re-elected.	▌ ✓ Henry B. González (Democratic) 91.5%; ▌Roger V. Gary (Libertarian) 5.6%; ▌Benedict D. LaRosa (Independent) 3.0%
Texas 21	Tom Loeffler	Republican	1978	Incumbent re-elected.	▌ ✓ Tom Loeffler (Republican) 74.6%; ▌Charles S. Stough (Democratic) 24.6%; ▌Jeffrey J. Brown (Libertarian) 0.9%
Texas 22	Ron Paul	Republican	1976 (special); 1976 (defeated); 1978	Incumbent re-elected.	▌ ✓ Ron Paul (Republican) 98.6%
Texas 23	Chick Kazen	Democratic	1966	Incumbent re-elected.	▌ ✓ Chick Kazen (Democratic) 55.3%; ▌Jeff Wentworth (Republican) 44.2%; ▌Parker Abell (Libertarian) 0.5%
Texas 24	Martin Frost	Democratic	1978	Incumbent re-elected.	▌ ✓ Martin Frost (Democratic) 72.9%; ▌Lucy Patterson (Republican) 26.0%; ▌David Guier (Libertarian) 1.1%
Texas 25	None (district created)			New seat. Democratic gain.	▌ ✓ Michael A. Andrews (Democratic) 60.4%; ▌Mike Faubion (Republican) 37.9%; Others: ▌Barbara Coldiron (Citizens) 0.9%; ▌Jeff Calvert (Libertarian) 0.8%
Texas 26	None (district created)			New seat. Democratic gain.	▌ ✓ Tom Vandergriff (Democratic) 50.1%; ▌Jim Bradshaw (Republican) 49.9%
Texas 27	None (district created)			New seat. Democratic gain.	▌ ✓ Solomon Ortiz (Democratic) 64.0%; ▌Jason Luby (Republican) 33.8%; ▌Steven R. Roberts (Libertarian) 2.1%

== Utah ==
District	Incumbent			This race	
District	Member	Party	First elected	Results	Candidates
Utah 1	Jim Hansen	Republican	1980	Incumbent re-elected.	▌ ✓ Jim Hansen (Republican) 62.8%; ▌A. Stephen Dirks (Democratic) 37.2%
Utah 2	David Daniel Marriott	Republican	1976	Incumbent re-elected.	▌ ✓ David Daniel Marriott (Republican) 53.8%; ▌Frances Farley (Democratic) 46.2%
Utah 3	None (district created)			New seat. Republican gain.	▌ ✓ Howard C. Nielson (Republican) 76.9%; ▌Henry A. Huish (Independent) 23.1%

== Vermont ==
District	Incumbent			This race	
District	Member	Party	First elected	Results	Candidates
Vermont at-large	Jim Jeffords	Republican	1974	Incumbent re-elected.	▌ ✓ Jim Jeffords (Republican) 69.3%; ▌Mark A. Kaplan (Democratic) 23.2%; ▌Robin Lloyd (Citizens) 3.9%; ▌Peter Diamondstone (Liberty Union) 1.7%; ▌Morris Earle (Independent) 1.1%; ▌George E. Trask (Libertarian) 0.9%

== Virginia ==
District	Incumbent			This race	
District	Member	Party	First elected	Results	Candidates
Virginia 1	Paul Trible	Republican	1976	Incumbent retired to run for U.S. Senator. Republican hold.	▌ ✓ Herbert H. Bateman (Republican) 55.2%; ▌John McGlennon (Democratic) 44.8%
Virginia 2	G. William Whitehurst	Republican	1968	Incumbent re-elected.	▌ ✓ G. William Whitehurst (Republican) 99.9%
Virginia 3	Thomas J. Bliley Jr.	Republican	1980	Incumbent re-elected.	▌ ✓ Thomas J. Bliley Jr. (Republican) 59.2%; ▌John A. Waldrop Jr. (Democratic) 40.8%
Virginia 4	Robert Daniel	Republican	1972	Incumbent lost re-election. Democratic gain.	▌ ✓ Norman Sisisky (Democratic) 54.4%; ▌Robert Daniel (Republican) 45.6%
Virginia 5	Dan Daniel	Democratic	1968	Incumbent re-elected.	▌ ✓ Dan Daniel (Democratic) 100%
Virginia 6	M. Caldwell Butler	Republican	1972	Incumbent retired. Democratic gain.	▌ ✓ Jim Olin (Democratic) 49.7%; ▌Kevin G. Miller (Republican) 48.5%; ▌Robert L. Fariss (Independent) 1.7%
Virginia 7	J. Kenneth Robinson	Republican	1970	Incumbent re-elected.	▌ ✓ J. Kenneth Robinson (Republican) 59.9%; ▌Lindsay G. Dorrier Jr. (Democratic) 36.3%; ▌David J. Toscano (Independent) 3.9%
Virginia 8	Stanford Parris	Republican	1972; 1974 (defeated); 1980	Incumbent re-elected.	▌ ✓ Stanford Parris (Republican) 49.7%; ▌Herbert Harris (Democratic) 48.6%; ▌Austin W. Morrill Jr. (Independent) 1.7%
Virginia 9	William C. Wampler	Republican	1952; 1954 (defeated); 1966	Incumbent lost re-election. Democratic gain.	▌ ✓ Rick Boucher (Democratic) 50.4%; ▌William C. Wampler (Republican) 49.6%
Virginia 10	Frank Wolf	Republican	1980	Incumbent re-elected.	▌ ✓ Frank Wolf (Republican) 52.7%; ▌Ira M. Lechner (Democratic) 45.9%; ▌Scott R. Bowden (Independent) 1.3%

== Washington ==
District	Incumbent			This race	
District	Member	Party	First elected	Results	Candidates
Washington 1	Joel Pritchard	Republican	1972	Incumbent re-elected.	▌ ✓ Joel Pritchard (Republican) 67.6%; ▌Brian Long (Democratic) 32.4%
Washington 2	Al Swift	Democratic	1978	Incumbent re-elected.	▌ ✓ Al Swift (Democratic) 59.6%; ▌Joan Houchen (Republican) 40.4%
Washington 3	Don Bonker	Democratic	1974	Incumbent re-elected.	▌ ✓ Don Bonker (Democratic) 60.1%; ▌J. T. Quigg (Republican) 36.8%; ▌O'Dean Williamson (Independent) 3.1%
Washington 4	Sid Morrison	Republican	1980	Incumbent re-elected.	▌ ✓ Sid Morrison (Republican) 69.8%; ▌Charles D. Kilbury (Democratic) 28.6%; ▌Michael Leroy Burns (Independent) 1.6%
Washington 5	Tom Foley	Democratic	1964	Incumbent re-elected.	▌ ✓ Tom Foley (Democratic) 64.3%; ▌John Sonneland (Republican) 35.7%
Washington 6	Norm Dicks	Democratic	1976	Incumbent re-elected.	▌ ✓ Norm Dicks (Democratic) 62.5%; ▌Ted Haley (Republican) 33.2%; ▌Jayne H. Anderson (Independent) 4.3%
Washington 7	Mike Lowry	Democratic	1978	Incumbent re-elected.	▌ ✓ Mike Lowry (Democratic) 70.9%; ▌Bob Dorse (Republican) 29.1%
Washington 8	None (district created)			New seat. Republican gain.	▌ ✓ Rod Chandler (Republican) 57.0%; ▌Beth Bland (Democratic) 43.0%

== West Virginia ==
District	Incumbent			This race	
District	Member	Party	First elected	Results	Candidates
West Virginia 1	Bob Mollohan	Democratic	1952; 1956 (retired); 1968	Incumbent retired. Democratic hold.	▌ ✓ Alan Mollohan (Democratic) 53.2%; ▌John F. McCuskey (Republican) 46.8%
West Virginia 2	Cleve Benedict	Republican	1980	Incumbent retired to run for U.S. Senator. Democratic gain.	▌ ✓ Buckey Staggers (Democratic) 64.0%; ▌J. D. Hinkle Jr. (Republican) 36.0%
West Virginia 3	Mick Staton	Republican	1980	Incumbent lost re-election. Democratic gain.	▌ ✓ Bob Wise (Democratic) 57.9%; ▌Mick Staton (Republican) 41.6%; ▌Adrienne Benjamin (Socialist Workers) 0.5%
West Virginia 4	Nick Rahall	Democratic	1976	Incumbent re-elected.	▌ ✓ Nick Rahall (Democratic) 80.5%; ▌Homer L. Harris (Republican) 19.5%

== Wisconsin ==
District	Incumbent			This race	
District	Member	Party	First elected	Results	Candidates
Wisconsin 1	Les Aspin	Democratic	1970	Incumbent re-elected.	▌ ✓ Les Aspin (Democratic) 61.0%; ▌Peter Jansson (Republican) 38.1%; ▌Arthur Jackson (Libertarian) 0.9%
Wisconsin 2	Robert Kastenmeier	Democratic	1958	Incumbent re-elected.	▌ ✓ Robert Kastenmeier (Democratic) 60.6%; ▌Jim Johnson (Republican) 38.7%; ▌David Beito (Libertarian) 0.7%
Wisconsin 3	Steve Gunderson	Republican	1980	Incumbent re-elected.	▌ ✓ Steve Gunderson (Republican) 56.6%; ▌Paul Offner (Democratic) 42.8%; ▌Kenneth Van Doren (Libertarian) 0.6%
Wisconsin 4	Clement J. Zablocki	Democratic	1948	Incumbent re-elected.	▌ ✓ Clement J. Zablocki (Democratic) 94.6%; ▌Nicholas P. Youngers (Libertarian) 3.0%; ▌John F. Baumgartner (Independent) 1.8%; ▌John Gudenschwager (Constitution) 0.7%
Wisconsin 5	Henry Reuss	Democratic	1954	Incumbent retired. Democratic hold.	▌ ✓ Jim Moody (Democratic) 63.5%; ▌Rod Johnston (Republican) 34.9%; Others: ▌William McCuen Jr. (Libertarian) 1.0%; ▌Walter Beach (Independent) 0.3%; ▌Cheryll Hidalgo (Independent) 0.2%
Wisconsin 6	Tom Petri	Republican	1979 (special)	Incumbent re-elected.	▌ ✓ Tom Petri (Republican) 65.0%; ▌Gordon Loehr (Democratic) 35.0%
Wisconsin 7	Dave Obey	Democratic	1969 (special)	Incumbent re-elected.	▌ ✓ Dave Obey (Democratic) 68.0%; ▌Bernard Zimmermann (Republican) 32.0%
Wisconsin 8	Toby Roth	Republican	1978	Incumbent re-elected.	▌ ✓ Toby Roth (Republican) 57.2%; ▌Ruth Clusen (Democratic) 42.0%; ▌Anthony Theisen (Libertarian) 0.8%
Wisconsin 9	Jim Sensenbrenner	Republican	1978	Incumbent re-elected.	▌ ✓ Jim Sensenbrenner (Republican) 99.9%

== Wyoming ==
District	Incumbent			This race	
District	Member	Party	First elected	Results	Candidates
Wyoming at-large	Dick Cheney	Republican	1978	Incumbent re-elected.	▌ ✓ Dick Cheney (Republican) 71.1%; ▌Ted Hommel (Democratic) 28.9%

== Non-voting delegates ==
District	Incumbent			This race	
District	Delegate	Party	First elected	Results	Candidates
American Samoa at-large	Fofō Iosefa Fiti Sunia	Democratic	1980	Incumbent re-elected.	▌ ✓ Fofō Iosefa Fiti Sunia (Democratic) Uncontested
District of Columbia at-large	Walter Fauntroy	Democratic	1970	Incumbent re-elected.	▌ ✓ Walter Fauntroy (Democratic) 83.0%; ▌John West (Republican) 15.3%
Guam at-large	Antonio Borja Won Pat	Democratic	1972	Incumbent re-elected.	▌ ✓ Antonio Borja Won Pat (Democratic) 51.7%; ▌Vicente T. Blaz (Republican) 48.3%
U.S. Virgin Islands at-large	Ron de Lugo	Democratic	1972; 1978 (retired); 1980	Incumbent re-elected.	▌ ✓ Ron de Lugo (Democratic) 82.8%; ▌Frank Prince (Republican) 14.6%; ▌Eric A. Smalls (Independent) 2.6%

== See also ==
- 1982 United States elections
  - 1982 United States gubernatorial elections
  - 1982 United States Senate elections
- 97th United States Congress
- 98th United States Congress

== Works cited ==
- Abramson, Paul; Aldrich, John; Rohde, David (1995). Change and Continuity in the 1992 Elections. CQ Press. ISBN 0871878399.
