= John McGlennon =

American politician in Virginia (born 1949)

John J. McGlennon (born July 23, 1949) is an American politician of the Democratic Party, a professor at the College of William and Mary, and Chair of the Board of Supervisors of James City County, Virginia. On the board, he represents the Roberts District. McGlennon is a native of New York, but has lived in the Commonwealth of Virginia since the 1970s.

McGlennon has been with the College of William and Mary since 1974 and served as the chairman of the Government Department from 1993 to 2003. McGlennon received his BA from Fordham University and went on to obtain both his MA and PhD from Johns Hopkins University. He specializes in United States politics with a special focus on the South and Virginia. He has many publications to his credit, including two books: The Life of the Parties: A Study of Presidential Activists, with Alan Abramowitz and Ronald Rapoport and Party Activists in Virginia, also with Alan Abramowitz and Ronald Rapoport.

== Political career ==
McGlennon ran for the United States Congress as a Democrat in 1982, almost defeating the Republican candidate in the open seat, Herbert Bateman, in a year that was bad for the Republican Party nationally. In 1984 McGlennon ran against Bateman again, but lost by a larger margin. In 1997 he was elected to the James City County Board of Supervisors and has been re-elected 6 times.

== Personal life ==
McGlennon is married to Terry Lynne Urbanski McGlennon. John and Terry have one dog, Snowy.

== Electoral history ==
Virginia's 1st congressional district general election results, 1982
Party	Candidate	Votes	%
Republican	Herbert H. Bateman	76,926	53.9
Democratic	John McGlennon	62,379	43.7
n/a	Write-ins	3,497	2.4
Total votes		142,802	100.0
Republican hold			

Virginia's 1st congressional district general election results, 1984
Party	Candidate	Votes	%
Republican	Herbert H. Bateman	118,085	59.1
Democratic	John McGlennon	79,577	39.8
Independent	E.J. Green	2,154	1.1
n/a	Write-ins	3	0.0
Total votes		199,822	100.0
Republican hold			

James City County Board of Supervisors Jamestown district general election results, 2001
Party	Candidate	Votes	%
Democratic	John McGlennon	3,025	97.8
n/a	Write-ins	69	2.2
Total votes		3,094	100.0
Democratic hold			

James City County Board of Supervisors Jamestown district general election results, 2005
Party	Candidate	Votes	%
Democratic	John McGlennon	2,326	59.0
Republican	Steven Suders	1,613	40.9
n/a	Write-ins	6	0.2
Total votes		3,945	100.0
Democratic hold			

James City County Board of Supervisors Jamestown district general election results, 2009
Party	Candidate	Votes	%
Democratic	John McGlennon	3,156	96.0
n/a	Write-ins	131	4.0
Total votes		3,287	100.0
Democratic hold			

James City County Board of Supervisors Roberts district general election results, 2011
Party	Candidate	Votes	%
Democratic	John McGlennon	1,924	50.3
Republican	Jack Fraley, Jr.	1,896	49.5
n/a	Write-ins	7	0.2
Total votes		3,827	100.0
Democratic hold			

James City County Board of Supervisors Roberts district general election results, 2015
Party	Candidate	Votes	%
Democratic	John McGlennon	1,966	50.5
Republican	Heather Cordasco	1,923	49.4
n/a	Write-ins	4	0.1
Total votes		3,893	100.0
Democratic hold			

James City County Board of Supervisors Roberts district general election results, 2019
Party	Candidate	Votes	%
Democratic	John McGlennon	3,192	65.4
Republican	Trevor Herrin	1,676	34.3
n/a	Write-ins	13	0.3
Total votes		3,893	100.0
Democratic hold			
