= James P. Dunleavy =

American politician and jurist

Member of the Maine House of Representatives from the Presque Isle district
- In office January 3, 1973 – January 1, 1975
- Preceded by: Ronald S. Wight
- Succeeded by: Constituency abolished

Personal details
- Born: September 23, 1939
- Died: December 10, 2023 (aged 84) Presque Isle, Maine, U.S.
- Party: Democratic
- Education: University of Maine School of Law

James P. Dunleavy (September 23, 1939 – December 10, 2023) was an American politician and jurist from Maine. Dunleavy, a Democrat, served one term in the Maine House of Representatives (1973-1974). He represented Presque Isle, Maine. After leaving the Legislature, Dunleavy was elected as Judge Probate for Aroostook County. Re-elected in 1980, he won the Democratic Party's nomination for Maine's 2nd congressional district in 1982. He lost to Republican incumbent Olympia Snowe.

Dunleavy is a graduate of the University of Maine School of Law, which he attended on scholarship. He is married and has seven children.

Dunleavy died in December 2023 at his home in Presque Isle, Maine, at the age of 84.

Maine House of Representatives
Preceded by Ronald S. Wight	Member of the Maine House of Representatives from Presque Isle; 1973–1975	Constituency abolished
