= Marjorie Bell Chambers =

American educator, historian, and politician (1923–2006)

- Born: Marjorie Bell; March 11, 1923; New York City, NY
- Died: August 25, 2006 (aged 83); Los Alamos, NM
- Education: Mount Holyoke College, Cornell University, University of New Mexico
- Occupations: historian, politician
- Years active: 1975-1990
- Known for: first woman to run for Lieutenant Governor of New Mexico, national president of the American Association of University Women, president of Colorado Women's College and Colby-Sawyer College

Marjorie Bell Chambers (March 11, 1923 – August 25, 2006) was an American educator, historian, and politician. She was the first woman to run for Lieutenant Governor of New Mexico, a national president of the American Association of University Women, and the president of two colleges (Colorado Women's College and Colby-Sawyer College).

== Biography ==
Chambers was born on March 11, 1923, to Kenneth and Katherine Bell (née Totman) in New York City. After surviving tuberculosis during childhood, she married physicist William H. Chambers in 1945. She and William relocated their family to New Mexico in 1950 when William became employed at the Los Alamos National Laboratory. The couple had four children and continued to live and work mostly in New Mexico for the remainder of their lives.

=== Death and legacy ===
Chambers died in August 2006, after a long illness. The New Mexico state chapter of the American Association of University Women created the AAUW-NM Ingenious Ideas Award inspired by Chambers and fellow long-time mentor Gloria Cordova. The University of New Mexico Foundation created the Endowed Faculty Award for Excellence in History in honor of Chambers and her husband, William.

== Academic career ==
Chambers received her B.A. in history and political science from Mount Holyoke College in 1943 and her Master's degree from Cornell University in 1948. She then earned her Ph.D. from the University of New Mexico in 1974.

Chambers was one of 60 women who gathered in (ironically) the men's Residence Hall at LANL on September 13, 1950, to found the Los Alamos branch of the American Association of University Women. She served as president of that branch, of the New Mexico Division, and finally as national President of the Association from 1975 to 1979.

== Political career ==
Chambers served as an adviser to four presidents and 10 governors of New Mexico in multiple appointed positions and commissions. She chaired the National Advisory Council on Women's Educational Programs under President Gerald Ford and the Committee for Women under President Jimmy Carter. Chambers was elected to the Los Alamos County Council in 1974 and won the Republican nomination in 1982 for New Mexico's 3rd Congressional District seat, losing to Bill Richardson. In 1986, she became the first woman in New Mexico to seek a party's nomination for Lieutenant Governor but lost to Jack L. Stahl.

== Published works ==
- Chambers, Marjorie Bell. “Technically Sweet Los Alamos: the Development of a Federally Sponsored Scientific Community.” University of New Mexico, 1974.
- Chambers, Marjorie Bell. “The AAUW-IFUW Relationship: An Emerging Issue in Progress.” Graduate Woman, vol. 73, no. 2, 1979, pp. 24–27.
- Chambers, Marjorie, and William H. Chambers." Conference Proceedings: The Cold War and Its Implications: Locally, Nationally, and Internationally": the Second Los Alamos International History Conference, Los Alamos, New Mexico, August 9–12, 1998. Los Alamos, N.M.: Los Alamos Historical Society, 1998. Print.
- Chambers, Marjorie, and Linda K. Aldrich. Los Alamos, New Mexico: a Survey to 1949. Los Alamos, N.M: Los Alamos Historical Society, 1999. Print.
- Chambers, Marjorie. The Battle for Civil Rights, or, How Los Alamos Became a County. Los Alamos, N.M: Los Alamos Historical Society, 1999. Print.

== Awards and distinctions ==
- 1977: Doctor of Laws honoris causa, Central Michigan University
- 2003: Governor's Award for Outstanding Women (New Mexico)
- 2003: Lifetime Achievement from New Mexico Commission on the Status of Women

== See also ==
- American Association of University Women
- Colorado Women's College
- Colby-Sawyer College
- Los Alamos National Laboratory
- National Woman's Party
