= 1976 United States presidential election in California =

- November 2, 1976
- Turnout: 81.53% (of registered voters) ▼0.60 pp 57.32% (of eligible voters) ▼7.20 pp

Nominee	Gerald Ford	Jimmy Carter
Party	Republican	Democratic
Home state	Michigan	Georgia
Running mate	Bob Dole	Walter Mondale
Electoral vote	45	0
Popular vote	3,882,244	3,742,284
Percentage	49.35%	47.57%
County results
Ford
40–50%
50–60%
60–70%
Carter
40–50%
50–60%
President before election
Gerald Ford
Republican
Elected President
Jimmy Carter
Democratic

The 1976 United States presidential election in California took place on November 2, 1976, as part of the 1976 United States presidential election. State voters chose 45 representatives, or electors, to the Electoral College, who voted for president and vice president.

California narrowly voted for the Republican incumbent, Gerald Ford, over the Democratic challenger, Jimmy Carter.

Ford won the state with a plurality of 49.35% of the vote to Carter's 47.57%, a victory margin of 1.78%, which made California almost 4% more Republican than the nation-at-large.

As of the 2024 presidential election, this is the last time that a Democrat has won the counties of Amador, El Dorado, Lassen, Madera, Placer, Shasta, Sierra and Yuba, Carter is also the last candidate from either party to carry Los Angeles by only a plurality. This also remains the last election in which a Republican presidential candidate won at least 40% of the vote in San Francisco, and the last time that county was not the most Democratic in the state. This is also the last time when a Democrat has won the presidency without California and the last time that the state would vote Republican in a close election. The state would not vote for a losing candidate again until 2000, and for the loser of the popular vote until 2004.

== Campaign ==
A presidential debate was held in San Francisco at the Palace of Fine Arts with President Ford and Jimmy Carter in attendance. The debate was sponsored by the League of Women Voters with Pauline Frederick from NPR being the moderator of the debate. 63.9 million people watched the debate.

== Results ==
1976 United States presidential election in California
Party	Candidate	Votes	Percentage	Electoral votes
Republican	Gerald Ford (incumbent)	3,882,244	49.35%	45
Democratic	Jimmy Carter	3,742,284	47.57%	0
No party	Eugene McCarthy (write-in)	58,412	0.74%	0
Independent	Roger MacBride	56,388	0.72%	0
American Independent	Lester Maddox	51,098	0.65%	0
Peace and Freedom	Margaret Wright	41,731	0.53%	0
Independent	Peter Camejo	17,259	0.22%	0
Independent	Gus Hall	12,766	0.16%	0
No party	Thomas J. Anderson (write-in)	4,565	0.06%	0
No party	Jules Levin (write-in)	222	0.00%	0
No party	Write-ins	74	0.00%	0
No party	Ben Bubar (write-in)	34	0.00%	0
No party	Ernest Miller (write-in)	26	0.00%	0
No party	Frank Taylor (write-in)	14	0.00%	0
Invalid or blank votes				—
Totals		7,867,117	100.00%	45
Voter turnout				—

=== Results by county ===
County	Gerald Ford Republican		Jimmy Carter Democratic		Various candidates Other parties		Margin		Total votes cast
County	#	%	#	%	#	%	#	%	Total votes cast
Alameda	155,280	38.09%	235,988	57.89%	16,413	4.02%	-80,708	-19.80%	407,681
Alpine	225	50.34%	189	42.28%	33	7.38%	36	8.06%	447
Amador	3,699	46.13%	4,037	50.35%	282	3.52%	-338	-4.22%	8,018
Butte	28,400	51.77%	24,203	44.12%	2,251	4.11%	4,197	7.65%	54,854
Calaveras	3,695	49.08%	3,607	47.91%	226	3.01%	88	1.17%	7,528
Colusa	2,733	52.74%	2,340	45.16%	109	2.10%	393	7.58%	5,182
Contra Costa	126,598	49.35%	123,742	48.24%	6,194	2.41%	2,856	1.11%	256,534
Del Norte	2,481	45.29%	2,789	50.91%	208	3.80%	-308	-5.62%	5,478
El Dorado	12,472	47.69%	12,763	48.80%	919	3.51%	-291	-1.11%	26,154
Fresno	72,533	48.10%	74,958	49.71%	3,314	2.19%	-2,425	-1.61%	150,805
Glenn	4,094	52.67%	3,501	45.04%	178	2.29%	593	7.63%	7,773
Humboldt	18,034	41.58%	23,500	54.18%	1,838	4.24%	-5,466	-12.60%	43,372
Imperial	10,618	49.94%	10,244	48.18%	400	1.88%	374	1.76%	21,262
Inyo	3,905	58.23%	2,635	39.29%	166	2.48%	1,270	18.94%	6,706
Kern	58,023	52.29%	50,567	45.57%	2,371	2.14%	7,456	6.72%	110,961
Kings	8,263	49.65%	8,061	48.44%	318	1.91%	202	1.21%	16,642
Lake	5,462	44.46%	6,374	51.88%	449	3.64%	-912	-7.42%	12,285
Lassen	3,007	42.97%	3,801	54.32%	190	2.71%	-794	-11.35%	6,998
Los Angeles	1,174,926	47.78%	1,221,893	49.69%	62,258	2.53%	-46,967	-1.91%	2,459,077
Madera	6,844	45.96%	7,625	51.20%	423	2.84%	-781	-5.24%	14,892
Marin	53,425	52.52%	43,590	42.86%	4,700	4.62%	9,835	9.66%	101,715
Mariposa	2,012	46.61%	2,093	48.48%	212	4.91%	-81	-1.87%	4,317
Mendocino	9,784	45.49%	10,653	49.53%	1,072	4.98%	-869	-4.04%	21,509
Merced	14,842	46.08%	16,637	51.65%	729	2.27%	-1,795	-5.57%	32,208
Modoc	1,917	51.20%	1,733	46.29%	94	2.51%	184	4.91%	3,744
Mono	1,600	58.80%	1,025	37.67%	96	3.53%	575	21.13%	2,721
Monterey	40,896	51.02%	36,849	45.97%	2,408	3.01%	4,047	5.05%	80,153
Napa	20,839	51.83%	18,048	44.89%	1,318	3.28%	2,791	6.94%	40,205
Nevada	8,170	48.40%	7,926	46.95%	785	4.65%	244	1.45%	16,881
Orange	408,632	62.16%	232,246	35.33%	16,555	2.51%	176,386	26.83%	657,433
Placer	18,154	45.03%	21,026	52.16%	1,131	2.81%	-2,872	-7.13%	40,311
Plumas	2,884	43.94%	3,429	52.25%	250	3.81%	-545	-8.31%	6,563
Riverside	97,774	49.24%	96,228	48.46%	4,556	2.30%	1,546	0.78%	198,558
Sacramento	123,110	44.63%	144,203	52.27%	8,563	3.10%	-21,093	-7.64%	275,876
San Benito	3,398	50.87%	3,122	46.74%	160	2.40%	276	4.13%	6,680
San Bernardino	113,265	49.49%	109,636	47.90%	5,984	2.61%	3,629	1.59%	228,885
San Diego	353,302	55.74%	263,654	41.60%	16,839	2.66%	89,648	14.14%	633,795
San Francisco	103,561	40.31%	133,733	52.06%	19,594	7.63%	-30,172	-11.75%	256,888
San Joaquin	50,277	49.60%	48,733	48.08%	2,351	2.32%	1,544	1.52%	101,361
San Luis Obispo	27,785	51.17%	24,926	45.91%	1,587	2.92%	2,859	5.26%	54,298
San Mateo	117,338	50.63%	102,896	44.40%	11,507	4.97%	14,442	6.23%	231,741
Santa Barbara	60,922	50.83%	55,018	45.91%	3,904	3.26%	5,904	4.92%	119,844
Santa Clara	219,188	49.46%	208,023	46.94%	15,927	3.60%	11,165	2.52%	443,138
Santa Cruz	31,872	43.09%	37,772	51.06%	4,325	5.85%	-5,900	-7.97%	73,969
Shasta	17,273	45.63%	19,200	50.72%	1,381	3.65%	-1,927	-5.09%	37,854
Sierra	680	43.15%	841	53.36%	55	3.49%	-161	-10.21%	1,576
Siskiyou	7,070	48.37%	7,060	48.31%	485	3.32%	10	0.06%	14,615
Solano	26,136	42.40%	33,682	54.64%	1,826	2.96%	-7,546	-12.24%	61,644
Sonoma	50,555	47.72%	50,353	47.52%	5,044	4.76%	202	0.20%	105,952
Stanislaus	32,937	44.83%	38,448	52.34%	2,080	2.83%	-5,511	-7.51%	73,465
Sutter	8,745	54.21%	6,966	43.18%	420	2.61%	1,779	11.03%	16,131
Tehama	6,110	44.81%	6,990	51.27%	535	3.92%	-880	-6.46%	13,635
Trinity	1,989	45.66%	2,172	49.86%	195	4.48%	-183	-4.20%	4,356
Tulare	31,864	54.52%	25,551	43.72%	1,027	1.76%	6,313	10.80%	58,442
Tuolumne	6,104	46.94%	6,492	49.93%	407	3.13%	-388	-2.99%	13,003
Ventura	82,670	53.20%	68,529	44.10%	4,201	2.70%	14,141	9.10%	155,400
Yolo	18,376	42.42%	23,533	54.33%	1,408	3.25%	-5,157	-11.91%	43,317
Yuba	5,496	44.74%	6,451	52.51%	338	2.75%	-955	-7.77%	12,285
Total	3,882,244	49.35%	3,742,284	47.57%	242,589	3.08%	139,960	1.78%	7,867,117

==== Counties that flipped from Republican to Democratic ====
- El Dorado
- Fresno
- Mariposa
- Los Angeles
- Tuolumne
- Mendocino
- Trinity
- Amador
- Shasta
- Madera
- Merced
- Del Norte
- Tehama
- Placer
- Plumas
- Shasta
- Sierra
- Lake
- Stanislaus
- Sacramento
- Yuba
- Santa Cruz
- Plumas
- Sierra
- Lassen
- Solano
- Humboldt

=== Results by city ===
Official outcome by city and unincorporated areas of counties, of which Ford won 233 and Carter won 236.
City	County	Gerald Ford Republican		Jimmy Carter Democratic		Various candidates Other parties		Margin		Total Votes	1972 to 1976 Swing %
City	County	#	%	#	%	#	%	#	%	Total Votes	1972 to 1976 Swing %
Alameda	Alameda	11,699	50.69%	10,827	46.91%	555	2.40%	872	3.78%	23,081	-13.82%
Albany	Alameda	2,438	37.06%	3,846	58.46%	295	4.48%	-1,408	-21.40%	6,579	-8.04%
Berkeley	Alameda	11,882	22.47%	37,793	71.46%	3,212	6.07%	-25,911	-48.99%	52,887	11.07%
Emeryville	Alameda	533	36.18%	900	61.10%	40	2.72%	-367	-24.92%	1,473	3.30%
Fremont	Alameda	17,387	45.37%	20,079	52.39%	858	2.24%	-2,692	-7.02%	38,324	-17.81%
Hayward	Alameda	10,738	37.69%	16,986	59.63%	764	2.68%	-6,248	-21.93%	28,488	-19.08%
Livermore	Alameda	9,364	54.11%	7,612	43.99%	329	1.90%	1,752	10.12%	17,305	-17.14%
Newark	Alameda	3,424	40.38%	4,870	57.44%	185	2.18%	-1,446	-17.05%	8,479	-21.18%
Oakland	Alameda	34,337	30.09%	76,161	66.74%	3,623	3.17%	-41,824	-36.65%	114,121	-5.42%
Piedmont	Alameda	4,240	71.65%	1,579	26.68%	99	1.67%	2,661	44.96%	5,918	4.39%
Pleasanton	Alameda	7,220	58.98%	4,821	39.38%	200	1.63%	2,399	19.60%	12,241	-18.08%
San Leandro	Alameda	11,057	42.69%	14,365	55.46%	479	1.85%	-3,308	-12.77%	25,901	-23.86%
Union City	Alameda	3,131	35.68%	5,410	61.65%	234	2.67%	-2,279	-25.97%	8,775	-16.59%
Unincorporated Area	Alameda	20,084	44.72%	23,676	52.72%	1,150	2.56%	-3,592	-8.00%	44,910	-16.14%
Unapportioned Absentees	Alameda	7,746	50.35%	7,063	45.91%	576	3.74%	683	4.44%	15,385	-3.99%
Unincorporated Area	Alpine	225	51.25%	189	43.05%	25	5.69%	36	8.20%	439	-21.49%
Amador City	Amador	36	55.38%	29	44.62%	0	0.00%	7	10.77%	65	19.59%
Ione	Amador	334	46.78%	366	51.26%	14	1.96%	-32	-4.48%	714	-21.44%
Jackson	Amador	581	51.83%	513	45.76%	27	2.41%	68	6.07%	1,121	-7.72%
Plymouth	Amador	75	30.61%	166	67.76%	4	1.63%	-91	-37.14%	245	-45.05%
Sutter Creek	Amador	449	50.00%	426	47.44%	23	2.56%	23	2.56%	898	-9.00%
Unincorporated Area	Amador	1,856	43.89%	2,238	52.92%	135	3.19%	-382	-9.03%	4,229	-20.24%
Unapportioned Absentees	Amador	368	54.36%	299	44.17%	10	1.48%	69	10.19%	677	-8.72%
Biggs	Butte	157	36.09%	270	62.07%	8	1.84%	-113	-25.98%	435	-40.19%
Chico	Butte	5,330	48.92%	5,155	47.32%	410	3.76%	175	1.61%	10,895	1.66%
Gridley	Butte	613	51.38%	555	46.52%	25	2.10%	58	4.86%	1,193	-17.99%
Oroville	Butte	1,512	50.50%	1,412	47.16%	70	2.34%	100	3.34%	2,994	-22.13%
Unincorporated Area	Butte	20,788	53.68%	16,811	43.41%	1,127	2.91%	3,977	10.27%	38,726	-16.27%
Angels	Calaveras	471	48.91%	474	49.22%	18	1.87%	-3	-0.31%	963	-23.55%
Unincorporated Area	Calaveras	2,873	49.03%	2,842	48.50%	145	2.47%	31	0.53%	5,860	-26.27%
Unapportioned Absentees	Calaveras	351	53.34%	291	44.22%	16	2.43%	60	9.12%	658	-28.44%
Colusa	Colusa	777	50.23%	742	47.96%	28	1.81%	35	2.26%	1,547	-13.21%
Williams	Colusa	263	43.40%	336	55.45%	7	1.16%	-73	-12.05%	606	-26.55%
Unincorporated Area	Colusa	1,473	56.26%	1,107	42.28%	38	1.45%	366	13.98%	2,618	-5.73%
Unapportioned Absentees	Colusa	220	57.74%	155	40.68%	6	1.57%	65	17.06%	381	-24.89%
Antioch	Contra Costa	4,277	34.28%	8,040	64.45%	158	1.27%	-3,763	-30.16%	12,475	-23.24%
Brentwood	Contra Costa	373	33.73%	709	64.10%	24	2.17%	-336	-30.38%	1,106	-29.87%
Clayton	Contra Costa	684	59.12%	455	39.33%	18	1.56%	229	19.79%	1,157	-9.77%
Concord	Contra Costa	18,511	49.11%	18,553	49.22%	631	1.67%	-42	-0.11%	37,695	-16.32%
El Cerrito	Contra Costa	5,116	45.54%	5,851	52.09%	266	2.37%	-735	-6.54%	11,233	-5.85%
Hercules	Contra Costa	127	50.40%	124	49.21%	1	0.40%	3	1.19%	252	-12.60%
Lafayette	Contra Costa	6,939	67.57%	3,142	30.60%	188	1.83%	3,797	36.98%	10,269	-0.71%
Martinez	Contra Costa	3,781	44.78%	4,484	53.10%	179	2.12%	-703	-8.33%	8,444	-11.22%
Moraga	Contra Costa	5,177	72.68%	1,877	26.35%	69	0.97%	3,300	46.33%	7,123	N/A
Pinole	Contra Costa	2,470	44.86%	2,900	52.67%	136	2.47%	-430	-7.81%	5,506	-29.31%
Pittsburg	Contra Costa	2,712	29.26%	6,416	69.23%	140	1.51%	-3,704	-39.97%	9,268	-11.20%
Pleasant Hill	Contra Costa	5,502	50.37%	5,199	47.60%	222	2.03%	303	2.77%	10,923	-14.28%
Richmond	Contra Costa	6,230	26.55%	16,803	71.61%	432	1.84%	-10,573	-45.06%	23,465	-12.95%
San Pablo	Contra Costa	1,352	27.02%	3,539	70.74%	112	2.24%	-2,187	-43.71%	5,003	-30.75%
Walnut Creek	Contra Costa	16,676	68.12%	7,491	30.60%	313	1.28%	9,185	37.52%	24,480	-6.12%
Unincorporated Area	Contra Costa	39,059	52.72%	33,603	45.36%	1,424	1.92%	5,456	7.36%	74,086	-10.89%
Unapportioned Absentees	Contra Costa	7,612	61.50%	4,556	36.81%	209	1.69%	3,056	24.69%	12,377	-1.85%
Crescent City	Del Norte	397	47.60%	410	49.16%	27	3.24%	-13	-1.56%	834	-15.57%
Unincorporated Area	Del Norte	1,863	45.04%	2,144	51.84%	129	3.12%	-281	-6.79%	4,136	-18.83%
Unapportioned Absentees	Del Norte	221	47.32%	235	50.32%	11	2.36%	-14	-3.00%	467	-28.37%
Placerville	El Dorado	1,230	48.31%	1,256	49.33%	60	2.36%	-26	-1.02%	2,546	-13.22%
South Lake Tahoe	El Dorado	2,707	47.52%	2,862	50.24%	128	2.25%	-155	-2.72%	5,697	-12.19%
Unincorporated Area	El Dorado	7,707	47.67%	8,063	49.87%	398	2.46%	-356	-2.20%	16,168	-16.23%
Unapportioned Absentees	El Dorado	828	56.56%	582	39.75%	54	3.69%	246	16.80%	1,464	N/A
Clovis	Fresno	3,509	46.20%	3,987	52.49%	100	1.32%	-478	-6.29%	7,596	-12.24%
Coalinga	Fresno	946	46.21%	1,057	51.64%	44	2.15%	-111	-5.42%	2,047	-14.20%
Firebaugh	Fresno	215	32.04%	445	66.32%	11	1.64%	-230	-34.28%	671	7.81%
Fowler	Fresno	330	50.15%	319	48.48%	9	1.37%	11	1.67%	658	0.53%
Fresno	Fresno	26,549	43.70%	33,266	54.76%	938	1.54%	-6,717	-11.06%	60,753	-6.10%
Huron	Fresno	101	32.27%	209	66.77%	3	0.96%	-108	-34.50%	313	1.10%
Kerman	Fresno	309	41.26%	429	57.28%	11	1.47%	-120	-16.02%	749	-16.57%
Kingsburg	Fresno	993	61.91%	589	36.72%	22	1.37%	404	25.19%	1,604	-9.95%
Mendota	Fresno	143	29.79%	330	68.75%	7	1.46%	-187	-38.96%	480	-5.29%
Orange Cove	Fresno	189	29.39%	441	68.58%	13	2.02%	-252	-39.19%	643	-17.27%
Parlier	Fresno	121	30.71%	267	67.77%	6	1.52%	-146	-37.06%	394	-12.69%
Reedley	Fresno	1,756	58.05%	1,235	40.83%	34	1.12%	521	17.22%	3,025	-3.03%
Sanger	Fresno	1,070	36.56%	1,809	61.80%	48	1.64%	-739	-25.25%	2,927	-6.96%
San Joaquin	Fresno	82	39.42%	119	57.21%	7	3.37%	-37	-17.79%	208	-3.05%
Selma	Fresno	1,146	48.05%	1,199	50.27%	40	1.68%	-53	-2.22%	2,385	-12.21%
Unincorporated Area	Fresno	30,701	53.44%	25,870	45.03%	882	1.54%	4,831	8.41%	57,453	-3.59%
Unapportioned Absentees	Fresno	4,373	55.21%	3,387	42.76%	161	2.03%	986	12.45%	7,921	-10.80%
Orland	Glenn	802	53.61%	661	44.18%	33	2.21%	141	9.43%	1,496	-18.63%
Willows	Glenn	872	68.39%	376	29.49%	27	2.12%	496	38.90%	1,275	21.32%
Unincorporated Area	Glenn	2,123	47.34%	2,275	50.72%	87	1.94%	-152	-3.39%	4,485	-29.00%
Unapportioned Absentees	Glenn	297	60.12%	189	38.26%	8	1.62%	108	21.86%	494	-6.77%
Arcata	Humboldt	1,866	32.52%	3,680	64.13%	192	3.35%	-1,814	-31.61%	5,738	-6.13%
Blue Lake	Humboldt	148	32.24%	287	62.53%	24	5.23%	-139	-30.28%	459	-5.68%
Eureka	Humboldt	4,282	45.14%	4,939	52.06%	266	2.80%	-657	-6.93%	9,487	-13.21%
Ferndale	Humboldt	308	52.65%	260	44.44%	17	2.91%	48	8.21%	585	-15.17%
Fortuna	Humboldt	916	54.30%	735	43.57%	36	2.13%	181	10.73%	1,687	-15.71%
Rio Dell	Humboldt	341	41.53%	454	55.30%	26	3.17%	-113	-13.76%	821	-11.46%
Trinidad	Humboldt	49	27.22%	129	71.67%	2	1.11%	-80	-44.44%	180	-50.66%
Unincorporated Area	Humboldt	8,765	41.38%	11,735	55.40%	684	3.23%	-2,970	-14.02%	21,184	-18.68%
Unapportioned Absentees	Humboldt	1,359	49.47%	1,281	46.63%	107	3.90%	78	2.84%	2,747	-9.33%
Brawley	Imperial	1,852	49.33%	1,849	49.25%	53	1.41%	3	0.08%	3,754	-15.14%
Calexico	Imperial	588	30.98%	1,267	66.75%	43	2.27%	-679	-35.77%	1,898	-18.68%
Calipatria	Imperial	191	46.36%	216	52.43%	5	1.21%	-25	-6.07%	412	-13.57%
El Centro	Imperial	3,293	54.87%	2,633	43.87%	76	1.27%	660	11.00%	6,002	-23.61%
Holtville	Imperial	550	53.04%	476	45.90%	11	1.06%	74	7.14%	1,037	-30.73%
Imperial	Imperial	431	47.21%	459	50.27%	23	2.52%	-28	-3.07%	913	-49.67%
Westmorland	Imperial	119	39.93%	174	58.39%	5	1.68%	-55	-18.46%	298	-16.04%
Unincorporated Area	Imperial	2,936	50.25%	2,806	48.02%	101	1.73%	130	2.22%	5,843	-32.72%
Unapportioned Absentees	Imperial	658	62.97%	364	34.83%	23	2.20%	294	28.13%	1,045	-25.21%
Bishop	Inyo	852	62.14%	491	35.81%	28	2.04%	361	26.33%	1,371	-26.05%
Unincorporated Area	Inyo	2,688	56.34%	1,972	41.33%	111	2.33%	716	15.01%	4,771	-21.22%
Unapportioned Absentees	Inyo	365	66.48%	172	31.33%	12	2.19%	193	35.15%	549	-6.14%
Arvin	Kern	385	36.95%	636	61.04%	21	2.02%	-251	-24.09%	1,042	-21.67%
Bakersfield	Kern	16,262	56.30%	12,188	42.19%	435	1.51%	4,074	14.10%	28,885	-9.12%
California City	Kern	360	43.80%	433	52.68%	29	3.53%	-73	-8.88%	822	-45.32%
Delano	Kern	1,698	44.68%	2,065	54.34%	37	0.97%	-367	-9.66%	3,800	-23.16%
Maricopa	Kern	83	37.90%	128	58.45%	8	3.65%	-45	-20.55%	219	-28.24%
McFarland	Kern	322	38.15%	517	61.26%	5	0.59%	-195	-23.10%	844	-39.10%
Ridgecrest	Kern	2,847	56.95%	2,035	40.71%	117	2.34%	812	16.24%	4,999	-32.21%
Shafter	Kern	1,023	55.66%	786	42.76%	29	1.58%	237	12.89%	1,838	-23.78%
Taft	Kern	997	55.20%	782	43.30%	27	1.50%	215	11.90%	1,806	-20.20%
Tehachapi	Kern	700	49.61%	698	49.47%	13	0.92%	2	0.14%	1,411	-32.02%
Wasco	Kern	949	48.94%	962	49.61%	28	1.44%	-13	-0.67%	1,939	-12.94%
Unincorporated Area	Kern	29,455	50.74%	27,548	47.46%	1,044	1.80%	1,907	3.29%	58,047	-20.65%
Unapportioned Absentees	Kern	2,942	60.96%	1,789	37.07%	95	1.97%	1,153	23.89%	4,826	-16.75%
Corcoran	Kings	627	45.17%	750	54.03%	11	0.79%	-123	-8.86%	1,388	-6.68%
Hanford	Kings	2,553	50.22%	2,467	48.52%	64	1.26%	86	1.69%	5,084	-14.20%
Lemoore	Kings	1,018	52.34%	901	46.32%	26	1.34%	117	6.02%	1,945	-23.14%
Unincorporated Area	Kings	3,629	49.25%	3,632	49.29%	107	1.45%	-3	-0.04%	7,368	-16.12%
Unapportioned Absentees	Kings	436	57.14%	311	40.76%	16	2.10%	125	16.38%	763	-28.61%
Lakeport	Lake	691	51.38%	604	44.91%	50	3.72%	87	6.47%	1,345	-13.32%
Unincorporated Area	Lake	4,287	43.15%	5,341	53.76%	306	3.08%	-1,054	-10.61%	9,934	-22.66%
Unapportioned Absentees	Lake	484	50.89%	429	45.11%	38	4.00%	55	5.78%	951	-32.20%
Susanville	Lassen	1,056	40.88%	1,486	57.53%	41	1.59%	-430	-16.65%	2,583	-14.08%
Unincorporated Area	Lassen	1,688	43.64%	2,078	53.72%	102	2.64%	-390	-10.08%	3,868	-22.28%
Unapportioned Absentees	Lassen	263	51.27%	237	46.20%	13	2.53%	26	5.07%	513	-12.49%
Alhambra	Los Angeles	12,754	54.33%	10,289	43.83%	431	1.84%	2,465	10.50%	23,474	-18.24%
Arcadia	Los Angeles	17,206	73.91%	5,729	24.61%	344	1.48%	11,477	49.30%	23,279	-10.14%
Artesia	Los Angeles	1,656	48.27%	1,721	50.16%	54	1.57%	-65	-1.89%	3,431	-27.98%
Avalon	Los Angeles	551	64.52%	273	31.97%	30	3.51%	278	32.55%	854	-8.39%
Azusa	Los Angeles	3,111	44.10%	3,761	53.31%	183	2.59%	-650	-9.21%	7,055	-25.04%
Baldwin Park	Los Angeles	3,548	37.68%	5,626	59.76%	241	2.56%	-2,078	-22.07%	9,415	-34.59%
Bell	Los Angeles	2,023	42.94%	2,598	55.15%	90	1.91%	-575	-12.21%	4,711	-33.18%
Bellflower	Los Angeles	8,243	48.15%	8,509	49.70%	368	2.15%	-266	-1.55%	17,120	-30.95%
Bell Gardens	Los Angeles	1,262	30.97%	2,735	67.12%	78	1.91%	-1,473	-36.15%	4,075	-46.73%
Beverly Hills	Los Angeles	8,094	46.95%	8,974	52.06%	171	0.99%	-880	-5.10%	17,239	-4.76%
Bradbury	Los Angeles	283	73.89%	94	24.54%	6	1.57%	189	49.35%	383	-13.39%
Burbank	Los Angeles	20,680	58.86%	13,824	39.35%	628	1.79%	6,856	19.51%	35,132	-18.22%
Carson	Los Angeles	6,234	29.00%	14,905	69.34%	356	1.66%	-8,671	-40.34%	21,495	-34.17%
Cerritos	Los Angeles	8,179	54.84%	6,525	43.75%	210	1.41%	1,654	11.09%	14,914	-31.28%
Claremont	Los Angeles	6,147	56.37%	4,512	41.38%	245	2.25%	1,635	14.99%	10,904	-3.64%
Commerce	Los Angeles	457	22.07%	1,583	76.44%	31	1.50%	-1,126	-54.37%	2,071	-27.11%
Compton	Los Angeles	1,122	6.93%	14,859	91.84%	198	1.22%	-13,737	-84.91%	16,179	-8.56%
Covina	Los Angeles	7,696	60.05%	4,901	38.24%	218	1.70%	2,795	21.81%	12,815	-20.16%
Cudahy	Los Angeles	781	36.07%	1,333	61.57%	51	2.36%	-552	-25.50%	2,165	-33.36%
Culver City	Los Angeles	7,222	46.52%	8,022	51.68%	279	1.80%	-800	-5.15%	15,523	-20.72%
Downey	Los Angeles	19,027	58.15%	13,090	40.01%	601	1.84%	5,937	18.15%	32,718	-23.34%
Duarte	Los Angeles	2,209	52.42%	1,913	45.40%	92	2.18%	296	7.02%	4,214	-25.77%
El Monte	Los Angeles	6,112	42.59%	7,896	55.02%	344	2.40%	-1,784	-12.43%	14,352	-31.87%
El Segundo	Los Angeles	3,807	65.38%	1,886	32.39%	130	2.23%	1,921	32.99%	5,823	-11.61%
Gardena	Los Angeles	5,334	42.00%	7,128	56.12%	239	1.88%	-1,794	-14.12%	12,701	-30.86%
Glendale	Los Angeles	36,521	67.15%	16,894	31.06%	971	1.79%	19,627	36.09%	54,386	-13.74%
Glendora	Los Angeles	8,827	64.75%	4,535	33.26%	271	1.99%	4,292	31.48%	13,633	-17.52%
Hawaiian Gardens	Los Angeles	565	30.93%	1,222	66.89%	40	2.19%	-657	-35.96%	1,827	-32.33%
Hawthorne	Los Angeles	8,047	49.94%	7,748	48.09%	318	1.97%	299	1.86%	16,113	-28.22%
Hermosa Beach	Los Angeles	4,142	54.54%	3,241	42.68%	211	2.78%	901	11.86%	7,594	7.11%
Hidden Hills	Los Angeles	533	73.21%	185	25.41%	10	1.37%	348	47.80%	728	-1.27%
Huntington Park	Los Angeles	2,934	45.17%	3,424	52.72%	137	2.11%	-490	-7.54%	6,495	-28.08%
Industry	Los Angeles	50	60.24%	29	34.94%	4	4.82%	21	25.30%	83	-1.97%
Inglewood	Los Angeles	8,379	31.95%	17,434	66.47%	416	1.59%	-9,055	-34.52%	26,229	-44.55%
Irwindale	Los Angeles	63	28.38%	157	70.72%	2	0.90%	-94	-42.34%	222	-4.80%
Lakewood	Los Angeles	15,574	49.67%	15,178	48.40%	605	1.93%	396	1.26%	31,357	-25.87%
La Mirada	Los Angeles	8,728	59.24%	5,799	39.36%	207	1.40%	2,929	19.88%	14,734	-21.52%
La Puente	Los Angeles	2,249	34.50%	4,110	63.06%	159	2.44%	-1,861	-28.55%	6,518	-27.52%
La Verne	Los Angeles	4,023	58.88%	2,690	39.37%	120	1.76%	1,333	19.51%	6,833	-12.85%
Lawndale	Los Angeles	2,324	45.85%	2,603	51.35%	142	2.80%	-279	-5.50%	5,069	-24.55%
Lomita	Los Angeles	3,011	51.27%	2,721	46.33%	141	2.40%	290	4.94%	5,873	-20.52%
Long Beach	Los Angeles	66,613	51.06%	61,210	46.92%	2,641	2.02%	5,403	4.14%	130,464	-16.67%
Los Angeles	Los Angeles	383,774	41.77%	517,485	56.32%	17,621	1.92%	-133,711	-14.55%	918,880	-9.68%
Lynwood	Los Angeles	2,988	33.90%	5,669	64.32%	157	1.78%	-2,681	-30.42%	8,814	-52.67%
Manhattan Beach	Los Angeles	9,841	62.15%	5,636	35.59%	358	2.26%	4,205	26.56%	15,835	0.36%
Maywood	Los Angeles	1,083	39.00%	1,635	58.88%	59	2.12%	-552	-19.88%	2,777	-36.50%
Monrovia	Los Angeles	5,468	56.86%	3,944	41.01%	205	2.13%	1,524	15.85%	9,617	-15.83%
Montebello	Los Angeles	5,680	39.40%	8,523	59.12%	213	1.48%	-2,843	-19.72%	14,416	-20.82%
Monterey Park	Los Angeles	7,865	45.79%	9,009	52.45%	301	1.75%	-1,144	-6.66%	17,175	-18.71%
Norwalk	Los Angeles	9,108	39.41%	13,541	58.59%	463	2.00%	-4,433	-19.18%	23,112	-35.94%
Palmdale	Los Angeles	2,316	60.17%	1,449	37.65%	84	2.18%	867	22.53%	3,849	-25.25%
Palos Verdes Estates	Los Angeles	5,692	77.76%	1,534	20.96%	94	1.28%	4,158	56.80%	7,320	-0.01%
Paramount	Los Angeles	2,479	36.96%	4,084	60.89%	144	2.15%	-1,605	-23.93%	6,707	-38.18%
Pasadena	Los Angeles	23,732	55.01%	18,643	43.21%	766	1.78%	5,089	11.80%	43,141	-8.59%
Pico Rivera	Los Angeles	4,531	31.50%	9,655	67.13%	196	1.36%	-5,124	-35.63%	14,382	-28.46%
Pomona	Los Angeles	9,758	44.29%	11,763	53.39%	513	2.33%	-2,005	-9.10%	22,034	-23.50%
Rancho Palos Verdes	Los Angeles	12,847	72.93%	4,543	25.79%	226	1.28%	8,304	47.14%	17,616	N/A
Redondo Beach	Los Angeles	11,249	54.68%	8,796	42.76%	526	2.56%	2,453	11.92%	20,571	-13.10%
Rolling Hills	Los Angeles	883	84.42%	145	13.86%	18	1.72%	738	70.55%	1,046	3.21%
Rolling Hills Estates	Los Angeles	3,034	76.06%	906	22.71%	49	1.23%	2,128	53.35%	3,989	-4.62%
Rosemead	Los Angeles	4,247	42.29%	5,573	55.49%	223	2.22%	-1,326	-13.20%	10,043	-26.86%
San Dimas	Los Angeles	3,921	56.74%	2,847	41.20%	142	2.05%	1,074	15.54%	6,910	-19.08%
San Fernando	Los Angeles	1,861	45.09%	2,164	52.44%	102	2.47%	-303	-7.34%	4,127	-22.74%
San Gabriel	Los Angeles	6,338	56.75%	4,612	41.30%	218	1.95%	1,726	15.45%	11,168	-18.07%
San Marino	Los Angeles	6,542	86.03%	988	12.99%	74	0.97%	5,554	73.04%	7,604	1.02%
Santa Fe Springs	Los Angeles	1,462	34.59%	2,699	63.85%	66	1.56%	-1,237	-29.26%	4,227	-31.13%
Santa Monica	Los Angeles	19,042	48.11%	19,500	49.26%	1,041	2.63%	-458	-1.16%	39,583	-11.03%
Sierra Madre	Los Angeles	3,481	64.59%	1,782	33.07%	126	2.34%	1,699	31.53%	5,389	-4.46%
Signal Hill	Los Angeles	696	44.39%	815	51.98%	57	3.64%	-119	-7.59%	1,568	-17.84%
South El Monte	Los Angeles	931	33.20%	1,819	64.87%	54	1.93%	-888	-31.67%	2,804	-30.34%
South Gate	Los Angeles	7,404	46.55%	8,208	51.61%	293	1.84%	-804	-5.06%	15,905	-32.77%
South Pasadena	Los Angeles	6,879	65.60%	3,409	32.51%	198	1.89%	3,470	33.09%	10,486	-7.56%
Temple City	Los Angeles	7,684	61.39%	4,557	36.41%	276	2.21%	3,127	24.98%	12,517	-18.43%
Torrance	Los Angeles	32,759	61.20%	19,766	36.93%	1,005	1.88%	12,993	24.27%	53,530	-17.34%
Walnut	Los Angeles	1,782	59.05%	1,192	39.50%	44	1.46%	590	19.55%	3,018	-26.12%
West Covina	Los Angeles	14,925	55.57%	11,416	42.50%	518	1.93%	3,509	13.06%	26,859	-24.04%
Whittier	Los Angeles	19,104	63.71%	10,399	34.68%	484	1.61%	8,705	29.03%	29,987	-17.49%
Unincorporated Area	Los Angeles	159,574	49.26%	158,261	48.86%	6,101	1.88%	1,313	0.41%	323,936	-19.31%
Unapportioned Absentees	Los Angeles	47,645	57.37%	33,060	39.81%	2,347	2.83%	14,585	17.56%	83,052	N/A
Chowchilla	Madera	474	39.63%	691	57.78%	31	2.59%	-217	-18.14%	1,196	-22.49%
Madera	Madera	2,148	41.89%	2,868	55.93%	112	2.18%	-720	-14.04%	5,128	-11.32%
Unincorporated Area	Madera	3,688	48.67%	3,674	48.48%	216	2.85%	14	0.18%	7,578	-13.74%
Unapportioned Absentees	Madera	534	56.87%	392	41.75%	13	1.38%	142	15.12%	939	-21.45%
Belvedere	Marin	1,010	72.51%	365	26.20%	18	1.29%	645	46.30%	1,393	15.38%
Corte Madera	Marin	2,064	51.78%	1,794	45.01%	128	3.21%	270	6.77%	3,986	-3.73%
Fairfax	Marin	1,133	35.78%	1,893	59.77%	141	4.45%	-760	-24.00%	3,167	2.39%
Larkspur	Marin	3,276	60.23%	2,069	38.04%	94	1.73%	1,207	22.19%	5,439	5.33%
Mill Valley	Marin	2,889	46.39%	3,138	50.39%	201	3.23%	-249	-4.00%	6,228	13.54%
Novato	Marin	7,573	56.95%	5,439	40.90%	285	2.14%	2,134	16.05%	13,297	-13.54%
Ross	Marin	872	67.44%	387	29.93%	34	2.63%	485	37.51%	1,293	16.59%
San Anselmo	Marin	2,637	44.50%	3,065	51.72%	224	3.78%	-428	-7.22%	5,926	2.95%
San Rafael	Marin	10,823	55.98%	8,040	41.59%	469	2.43%	2,783	14.40%	19,332	-3.12%
Sausalito	Marin	1,686	49.88%	1,571	46.48%	123	3.64%	115	3.40%	3,380	22.15%
Tiburon	Marin	1,980	63.28%	1,105	35.31%	44	1.41%	875	27.96%	3,129	9.04%
Unincorporated Area	Marin	13,710	50.55%	12,489	46.05%	921	3.40%	1,221	4.50%	27,120	4.11%
Unapportioned Absentees	Marin	3,772	60.74%	2,235	35.99%	203	3.27%	1,537	24.75%	6,210	-44.58%
Unincorporated Area	Mariposa	2,012	47.14%	2,093	49.04%	163	3.82%	-81	-1.90%	4,268	-18.71%
Fort Bragg	Mendocino	740	46.51%	818	51.41%	33	2.07%	-78	-4.90%	1,591	-1.10%
Point Arena	Mendocino	81	52.94%	62	40.52%	10	6.54%	19	12.42%	153	-33.09%
Ukiah	Mendocino	2,096	51.88%	1,840	45.54%	104	2.57%	256	6.34%	4,040	-14.62%
Willits	Mendocino	432	43.16%	531	53.05%	38	3.80%	-99	-9.89%	1,001	-21.60%
Unincorporated Area	Mendocino	5,845	44.17%	6,874	51.95%	514	3.88%	-1,029	-7.78%	13,233	-11.49%
Unapportioned Absentees	Mendocino	590	50.82%	528	45.48%	43	3.70%	62	5.34%	1,161	-7.44%
Atwater	Merced	1,399	47.96%	1,452	49.78%	66	2.26%	-53	-1.82%	2,917	-27.38%
Dos Palos	Merced	451	50.22%	434	48.33%	13	1.45%	17	1.89%	898	-12.33%
Gustine	Merced	380	33.22%	742	64.86%	22	1.92%	-362	-31.64%	1,144	-25.19%
Livingston	Merced	228	36.89%	382	61.81%	8	1.29%	-154	-24.92%	618	-20.96%
Los Banos	Merced	1,162	39.09%	1,755	59.03%	56	1.88%	-593	-19.95%	2,973	-11.73%
Merced	Merced	3,978	47.96%	4,194	50.57%	122	1.47%	-216	-2.60%	8,294	-14.45%
Unincorporated Area	Merced	6,226	46.37%	6,915	51.50%	285	2.12%	-689	-5.13%	13,426	-18.66%
Unapportioned Absentees	Merced	1,018	56.31%	763	42.20%	27	1.49%	255	14.10%	1,808	-16.55%
Alturas	Modoc	525	41.83%	705	56.18%	25	1.99%	-180	-14.34%	1,255	-19.98%
Unincorporated Area	Modoc	1,220	56.88%	878	40.93%	47	2.19%	342	15.94%	2,145	-15.89%
Unapportioned Absentees	Modoc	172	51.96%	150	45.32%	9	2.72%	22	6.65%	331	-23.74%
Unincorporated Area	Mono	1,600	59.55%	1,025	38.15%	62	2.31%	575	21.40%	2,687	-15.93%
Carmel-by-the-Sea	Monterey	1,490	57.62%	1,034	39.98%	62	2.40%	456	17.63%	2,586	3.30%
Del Rey Oaks	Monterey	378	53.24%	312	43.94%	20	2.82%	66	9.30%	710	-16.10%
Gonzales	Monterey	316	47.88%	334	50.61%	10	1.52%	-18	-2.73%	660	-8.44%
Greenfield	Monterey	303	48.56%	314	50.32%	7	1.12%	-11	-1.76%	624	-33.23%
King City	Monterey	744	66.67%	361	32.35%	11	0.99%	383	34.32%	1,116	-24.14%
Marina	Monterey	1,207	43.25%	1,538	55.11%	46	1.65%	-331	-11.86%	2,791	N/A
Monterey	Monterey	4,197	48.99%	4,161	48.57%	209	2.44%	36	0.42%	8,567	-4.49%
Pacific Grove	Monterey	3,131	46.91%	3,327	49.85%	216	3.24%	-196	-2.94%	6,674	-7.57%
Salinas	Monterey	10,394	50.84%	9,684	47.37%	367	1.80%	710	3.47%	20,445	-17.73%
Sand City	Monterey	26	39.39%	39	59.09%	1	1.52%	-13	-19.70%	66	-32.74%
Seaside	Monterey	1,700	30.87%	3,703	67.24%	104	1.89%	-2,003	-36.37%	5,507	-23.94%
Soledad	Monterey	384	36.75%	641	61.34%	20	1.91%	-257	-24.59%	1,045	-20.51%
Unincorporated Area	Monterey	13,284	57.50%	9,285	40.19%	532	2.30%	3,999	17.31%	23,101	-9.51%
Unapportioned Absentees	Monterey	3,342	59.69%	2,116	37.79%	141	2.52%	1,226	21.90%	5,599	N/A
Calistoga	Napa	787	54.05%	633	43.48%	36	2.47%	154	10.58%	1,456	-11.67%
Napa	Napa	9,451	48.56%	9,570	49.17%	443	2.28%	-119	-0.61%	19,464	-18.07%
St. Helena	Napa	1,122	65.12%	557	32.33%	44	2.55%	565	32.79%	1,723	2.09%
Yountville	Napa	476	42.65%	612	54.84%	28	2.51%	-136	-12.19%	1,116	-15.62%
Unincorporated Area	Napa	7,638	55.56%	5,733	41.70%	377	2.74%	1,905	13.86%	13,748	-13.93%
Unapportioned Absentees	Napa	1,365	57.72%	943	39.87%	57	2.41%	422	17.84%	2,365	-19.85%
Grass Valley	Nevada	1,155	49.63%	1,119	48.09%	53	2.28%	36	1.55%	2,327	-10.97%
Nevada City	Nevada	551	47.30%	572	49.10%	42	3.61%	-21	-1.80%	1,165	-4.45%
Unincorporated Area	Nevada	6,464	49.30%	6,235	47.56%	412	3.14%	229	1.75%	13,111	-15.07%
Anaheim	Orange	38,758	58.10%	26,464	39.67%	1,484	2.22%	12,294	18.43%	66,706	-19.11%
Brea	Orange	5,855	65.24%	2,983	33.24%	136	1.52%	2,872	32.00%	8,974	-17.30%
Buena Park	Orange	10,730	53.41%	8,944	44.52%	415	2.07%	1,786	8.89%	20,089	-26.05%
Costa Mesa	Orange	17,161	62.16%	9,805	35.51%	643	2.33%	7,356	26.64%	27,609	-10.18%
Cypress	Orange	8,703	60.89%	5,378	37.63%	211	1.48%	3,325	23.26%	14,292	-15.68%
Fountain Valley	Orange	13,401	66.19%	6,522	32.22%	322	1.59%	6,879	33.98%	20,245	-14.89%
Fullerton	Orange	24,289	62.67%	13,787	35.57%	680	1.75%	10,502	27.10%	38,756	-13.12%
Garden Grove	Orange	22,169	55.80%	16,549	41.65%	1,011	2.54%	5,620	14.15%	39,729	-23.66%
Huntington Beach	Orange	35,870	62.51%	20,526	35.77%	988	1.72%	15,344	26.74%	57,384	-13.94%
Irvine	Orange	9,789	66.06%	4,823	32.55%	206	1.39%	4,966	33.51%	14,818	-5.99%
Laguna Beach	Orange	4,354	57.20%	3,091	40.61%	167	2.19%	1,263	16.59%	7,612	2.11%
La Habra	Orange	9,575	60.79%	5,959	37.83%	218	1.38%	3,616	22.96%	15,752	-18.74%
La Palma	Orange	3,364	62.94%	1,900	35.55%	81	1.52%	1,464	27.39%	5,345	-21.31%
Los Alamitos	Orange	2,161	57.44%	1,552	41.25%	49	1.30%	609	16.19%	3,762	-14.34%
Newport Beach	Orange	21,910	74.98%	6,870	23.51%	441	1.51%	15,040	51.47%	29,221	3.14%
Orange	Orange	19,768	64.16%	10,384	33.70%	659	2.14%	9,384	30.46%	30,811	-16.51%
Placentia	Orange	7,672	63.74%	4,178	34.71%	187	1.55%	3,494	29.03%	12,037	-13.69%
San Clemente	Orange	6,195	69.49%	2,555	28.66%	165	1.85%	3,640	40.83%	8,915	-8.92%
San Juan Capistrano	Orange	4,042	66.73%	1,899	31.35%	116	1.92%	2,143	35.38%	6,057	-17.00%
Santa Ana	Orange	25,062	53.88%	20,374	43.80%	1,077	2.32%	4,688	10.08%	46,513	-21.31%
Seal Beach	Orange	9,003	64.32%	4,811	34.37%	183	1.31%	4,192	29.95%	13,997	-8.13%
Stanton	Orange	3,475	51.29%	3,171	46.80%	129	1.90%	304	4.49%	6,775	-27.75%
Tustin	Orange	6,805	66.13%	3,298	32.05%	188	1.83%	3,507	34.08%	10,291	-14.11%
Villa Park	Orange	2,405	80.38%	554	18.52%	33	1.10%	1,851	61.86%	2,992	-5.77%
Westminster	Orange	13,355	56.62%	9,765	41.40%	466	1.98%	3,590	15.22%	23,586	-22.43%
Yorba Linda	Orange	6,674	68.63%	2,894	29.76%	157	1.61%	3,780	38.87%	9,725	-19.07%
Unincorporated Area	Orange	60,007	68.54%	26,201	29.93%	1,337	1.53%	33,806	38.62%	87,545	-9.86%
Unapportioned Absentees	Orange	16,080	68.45%	7,009	29.84%	402	1.71%	9,071	38.61%	23,491	-14.74%
Auburn	Placer	1,590	50.51%	1,476	46.89%	82	2.60%	114	3.62%	3,148	-8.05%
Colfax	Placer	149	42.45%	193	54.99%	9	2.56%	-44	-12.54%	351	-9.27%
Lincoln	Placer	441	34.70%	796	62.63%	34	2.68%	-355	-27.93%	1,271	-27.17%
Rocklin	Placer	770	44.00%	951	54.34%	29	1.66%	-181	-10.34%	1,750	0.66%
Roseville	Placer	3,055	38.42%	4,773	60.02%	124	1.56%	-1,718	-21.60%	7,952	-12.48%
Unincorporated Area	Placer	11,004	47.27%	11,751	50.48%	525	2.26%	-747	-3.21%	23,280	-11.61%
Unapportioned Absentees	Placer	1,145	50.18%	1,086	47.59%	51	2.23%	59	2.59%	2,282	-15.56%
Portola	Plumas	195	33.91%	369	64.17%	11	1.91%	-174	-30.26%	575	-4.40%
Unincorporated Area	Plumas	2,374	45.12%	2,727	51.83%	160	3.04%	-353	-6.71%	5,261	-7.56%
Unapportioned Absentees	Plumas	315	47.01%	333	49.70%	22	3.28%	-18	-2.69%	670	-6.15%
Banning	Riverside	1,656	41.04%	2,295	56.88%	84	2.08%	-639	-15.84%	4,035	-24.14%
Beaumont	Riverside	890	43.39%	1,114	54.31%	47	2.29%	-224	-10.92%	2,051	-24.55%
Blythe	Riverside	858	47.93%	898	50.17%	34	1.90%	-40	-2.23%	1,790	-22.89%
Coachella	Riverside	333	24.85%	986	73.58%	21	1.57%	-653	-48.73%	1,340	-22.12%
Corona	Riverside	5,192	50.13%	4,990	48.18%	176	1.70%	202	1.95%	10,358	-16.22%
Desert Hot Springs	Riverside	751	42.72%	966	54.95%	41	2.33%	-215	-12.23%	1,758	-26.52%
Hemet	Riverside	5,379	53.86%	4,464	44.70%	144	1.44%	915	9.16%	9,987	-30.76%
Indian Wells	Riverside	491	85.54%	81	14.11%	2	0.35%	410	71.43%	574	-4.98%
Indio	Riverside	1,799	44.83%	2,161	53.85%	53	1.32%	-362	-9.02%	4,013	-18.41%
Lake Elsinore	Riverside	653	35.49%	1,116	60.65%	71	3.86%	-463	-25.16%	1,840	-10.15%
Norco	Riverside	2,271	50.24%	2,146	47.48%	103	2.28%	125	2.77%	4,520	-25.06%
Palm Desert	Riverside	2,866	68.01%	1,285	30.49%	63	1.50%	1,581	37.52%	4,214	N/A
Palm Springs	Riverside	6,670	55.76%	5,183	43.33%	109	0.91%	1,487	12.43%	11,962	-14.49%
Perris	Riverside	476	29.51%	1,108	68.69%	29	1.80%	-632	-39.18%	1,613	-38.53%
Rancho Mirage	Riverside	1,374	68.09%	625	30.97%	19	0.94%	749	37.12%	2,018	N/A
Riverside	Riverside	26,237	48.69%	26,686	49.52%	965	1.79%	-449	-0.83%	53,888	-12.88%
San Jacinto	Riverside	675	39.71%	987	58.06%	38	2.24%	-312	-18.35%	1,700	-35.57%
Unincorporated Area	Riverside	32,637	47.72%	34,510	50.46%	1,242	1.82%	-1,873	-2.74%	68,389	-25.70%
Unapportioned Absentees	Riverside	6,566	57.43%	4,627	40.47%	241	2.11%	1,939	16.96%	11,434	-17.34%
Folsom	Sacramento	1,451	46.33%	1,587	50.67%	94	3.00%	-136	-4.34%	3,132	-17.23%
Galt	Sacramento	554	45.63%	637	52.47%	23	1.89%	-83	-6.84%	1,214	-22.54%
Isleton	Sacramento	110	33.64%	207	63.30%	10	3.06%	-97	-29.66%	327	-23.74%
Sacramento	Sacramento	41,875	40.69%	58,936	57.26%	2,110	2.05%	-17,061	-16.58%	102,921	-5.46%
Unincorporated Area	Sacramento	79,120	47.85%	82,836	50.10%	3,382	2.05%	-3,716	-2.25%	165,338	-12.35%
Hollister	San Benito	1,296	47.16%	1,399	50.91%	53	1.93%	-103	-3.75%	2,748	-18.35%
San Juan Bautista	San Benito	165	35.48%	287	61.72%	13	2.80%	-122	-26.24%	465	-20.20%
Unincorporated Area	San Benito	1,690	55.17%	1,317	43.00%	56	1.83%	373	12.18%	3,063	-15.21%
Unapportioned Absentees	San Benito	247	66.22%	119	31.90%	7	1.88%	128	34.32%	373	6.89%
Adelanto	San Bernardino	165	41.88%	218	55.33%	11	2.79%	-53	-13.45%	394	-45.00%
Barstow	San Bernardino	2,183	43.54%	2,685	53.55%	146	2.91%	-502	-10.01%	5,014	-32.67%
Chino	San Bernardino	3,892	54.55%	3,126	43.81%	117	1.64%	766	10.74%	7,135	-19.87%
Colton	San Bernardino	1,613	30.08%	3,650	68.07%	99	1.85%	-2,037	-37.99%	5,362	-18.30%
Fontana	San Bernardino	2,498	36.67%	4,181	61.38%	133	1.95%	-1,683	-24.71%	6,812	-28.13%
Loma Linda	San Bernardino	2,486	84.50%	410	13.94%	46	1.56%	2,076	70.56%	2,942	2.18%
Montclair	San Bernardino	2,562	46.85%	2,768	50.61%	139	2.54%	-206	-3.77%	5,469	-31.03%
Needles	San Bernardino	539	47.12%	572	50.00%	33	2.88%	-33	-2.88%	1,144	-37.19%
Ontario	San Bernardino	8,464	47.53%	8,964	50.34%	380	2.13%	-500	-2.81%	17,808	-28.89%
Redlands	San Bernardino	8,367	61.79%	4,970	36.71%	203	1.50%	3,397	25.09%	13,540	-10.13%
Rialto	San Bernardino	3,973	42.79%	5,146	55.43%	165	1.78%	-1,173	-12.63%	9,284	-34.43%
San Bernardino	San Bernardino	12,749	41.15%	17,643	56.95%	589	1.90%	-4,894	-15.80%	30,981	-18.45%
Upland	San Bernardino	8,786	60.82%	5,404	37.41%	257	1.78%	3,382	23.41%	14,447	-18.58%
Victorville	San Bernardino	1,680	50.48%	1,575	47.33%	73	2.19%	105	3.16%	3,328	-31.09%
Unincorporated Area	San Bernardino	46,710	50.37%	43,766	47.19%	2,266	2.44%	2,944	3.17%	92,742	-24.79%
Unapportioned Absentees	San Bernardino	6,598	57.74%	4,558	39.88%	272	2.38%	2,040	17.85%	11,428	-23.03%
Carlsbad	San Diego	6,041	64.72%	3,141	33.65%	152	1.63%	2,900	31.07%	9,334	-7.89%
Chula Vista	San Diego	15,286	54.26%	12,428	44.12%	457	1.62%	2,858	10.15%	28,171	-23.19%
Coronado	San Diego	4,897	70.31%	1,941	27.87%	127	1.82%	2,956	42.44%	6,965	-7.40%
Del Mar	San Diego	1,296	48.45%	1,291	48.26%	88	3.29%	5	0.19%	2,675	-1.17%
El Cajon	San Diego	13,072	55.30%	10,190	43.11%	375	1.59%	2,882	12.19%	23,637	-16.45%
Escondido	San Diego	12,113	61.28%	7,312	36.99%	341	1.73%	4,801	24.29%	19,766	-17.59%
Imperial Beach	San Diego	2,179	47.95%	2,244	49.38%	121	2.66%	-65	-1.43%	4,544	-24.94%
La Mesa	San Diego	11,989	57.97%	8,374	40.49%	318	1.54%	3,615	17.48%	20,681	-13.90%
National City	San Diego	3,772	41.04%	5,236	56.96%	184	2.00%	-1,464	-15.93%	9,192	-28.81%
Oceanside	San Diego	10,986	57.81%	7,672	40.37%	347	1.83%	3,314	17.44%	19,005	-23.48%
San Diego	San Diego	157,780	53.47%	131,525	44.57%	5,801	1.97%	26,255	8.90%	295,106	-9.96%
San Marcos	San Diego	3,035	60.79%	1,876	37.57%	82	1.64%	1,159	23.21%	4,993	-19.20%
Vista	San Diego	6,963	60.87%	4,234	37.01%	243	2.12%	2,729	23.85%	11,440	-22.63%
Unincorporated Area	San Diego	84,864	59.14%	55,812	38.89%	2,825	1.97%	29,052	20.25%	143,501	-15.46%
Unapportioned Absentees	San Diego	19,029	63.57%	10,378	34.67%	527	1.76%	8,651	28.90%	29,934	-14.82%
San Francisco	San Francisco	103,561	40.96%	133,733	52.89%	15,558	6.15%	-30,172	-11.93%	252,852	2.33%
Escalon	San Joaquin	453	49.35%	447	48.69%	18	1.96%	6	0.65%	918	-20.97%
Lodi	San Joaquin	7,348	59.85%	4,704	38.32%	225	1.83%	2,644	21.54%	12,277	-12.31%
Manteca	San Joaquin	2,310	41.08%	3,225	57.35%	88	1.57%	-915	-16.27%	5,623	-30.68%
Ripon	San Joaquin	710	65.44%	368	33.92%	7	0.65%	342	31.52%	1,085	-11.65%
Stockton	San Joaquin	17,524	46.51%	19,544	51.87%	608	1.61%	-2,020	-5.36%	37,676	-10.29%
Tracy	San Joaquin	2,266	44.53%	2,731	53.66%	92	1.81%	-465	-9.14%	5,089	-22.95%
Unincorporated Area	San Joaquin	17,228	51.03%	15,910	47.12%	624	1.85%	1,318	3.90%	33,762	-15.06%
Unapportioned Absentees	San Joaquin	2,438	56.16%	1,804	41.56%	99	2.28%	634	14.60%	4,341	-16.69%
Arroyo Grande	San Luis Obispo	2,139	52.25%	1,891	46.19%	64	1.56%	248	6.06%	4,094	-17.99%
Grover City	San Luis Obispo	944	37.91%	1,508	60.56%	38	1.53%	-564	-22.65%	2,490	-21.49%
Morro Bay	San Luis Obispo	1,980	49.43%	1,925	48.05%	101	2.52%	55	1.37%	4,006	-13.74%
El Paso de Robles	San Luis Obispo	1,687	61.91%	1,006	36.92%	32	1.17%	681	24.99%	2,725	-12.50%
Pismo Beach	San Luis Obispo	1,276	50.16%	1,228	48.27%	40	1.57%	48	1.89%	2,544	-8.77%
San Luis Obispo	San Luis Obispo	8,002	51.48%	7,218	46.44%	323	2.08%	784	5.04%	15,543	-1.49%
Unincorporated Area	San Luis Obispo	11,757	52.46%	10,150	45.29%	503	2.24%	1,607	7.17%	22,410	-10.82%
Atherton	San Mateo	3,185	77.85%	827	20.22%	79	1.93%	2,358	57.64%	4,091	10.96%
Belmont	San Mateo	5,649	54.55%	4,378	42.28%	328	3.17%	1,271	12.27%	10,355	-5.51%
Brisbane	San Mateo	369	35.79%	602	58.39%	60	5.82%	-233	-22.60%	1,031	-7.38%
Burlingame	San Mateo	6,897	58.76%	4,403	37.51%	438	3.73%	2,494	21.25%	11,738	0.03%
Colma	San Mateo	45	31.03%	90	62.07%	10	6.90%	-45	-31.03%	145	-19.50%
Daly City	San Mateo	8,281	40.52%	10,850	53.09%	1,306	6.39%	-2,569	-12.57%	20,437	-9.19%
Foster City	San Mateo	5,084	60.19%	3,158	37.39%	204	2.42%	1,926	22.80%	8,446	-2.31%
Half Moon Bay	San Mateo	1,082	47.62%	1,059	46.61%	131	5.77%	23	1.01%	2,272	-14.91%
Hillsborough	San Mateo	3,766	80.57%	805	17.22%	103	2.20%	2,961	63.35%	4,674	5.46%
Menlo Park	San Mateo	6,853	54.65%	5,289	42.18%	397	3.17%	1,564	12.47%	12,539	2.20%
Millbrae	San Mateo	4,893	55.82%	3,519	40.14%	354	4.04%	1,374	15.67%	8,766	-3.98%
Pacifica	San Mateo	4,710	40.41%	6,418	55.06%	528	4.53%	-1,708	-14.65%	11,656	-8.71%
Portola Valley	San Mateo	1,400	67.34%	639	30.74%	40	1.92%	761	36.60%	2,079	15.06%
Redwood City	San Mateo	9,904	48.05%	9,892	47.99%	816	3.96%	12	0.06%	20,612	-10.49%
San Bruno	San Mateo	5,617	44.50%	6,464	51.21%	541	4.29%	-847	-6.71%	12,622	-10.72%
San Carlos	San Mateo	7,069	58.13%	4,752	39.08%	339	2.79%	2,317	19.05%	12,160	-8.07%
San Mateo	San Mateo	16,650	53.52%	13,321	42.82%	1,137	3.66%	3,329	10.70%	31,108	-2.49%
South San Francisco	San Mateo	6,203	40.55%	8,379	54.77%	716	4.68%	-2,176	-14.22%	15,298	-10.79%
Woodside	San Mateo	1,781	66.73%	816	30.57%	72	2.70%	965	36.16%	2,669	10.27%
Unincorporated Area	San Mateo	10,431	42.58%	13,061	53.31%	1,008	4.11%	-2,630	-10.73%	24,500	-1.79%
Unapportioned Absentees	San Mateo	7,469	62.06%	4,174	34.68%	392	3.26%	3,295	27.38%	12,035	2.71%
Carpinteria	Santa Barbara	1,732	48.90%	1,755	49.55%	55	1.55%	-23	-0.65%	3,542	-9.91%
Guadalupe	Santa Barbara	211	37.41%	348	61.70%	5	0.89%	-137	-24.29%	564	-27.13%
Lompoc	Santa Barbara	3,561	47.45%	3,808	50.75%	135	1.80%	-247	-3.29%	7,504	-33.75%
Santa Barbara	Santa Barbara	14,918	46.76%	16,274	51.01%	714	2.24%	-1,356	-4.25%	31,906	-6.72%
Santa Maria	Santa Barbara	5,961	53.40%	5,011	44.89%	190	1.70%	950	8.51%	11,162	-24.77%
Unincorporated Area	Santa Barbara	30,399	53.60%	25,155	44.35%	1,162	2.05%	5,244	9.25%	56,716	-3.60%
Unapportioned Absentees	Santa Barbara	4,140	59.37%	2,667	38.25%	166	2.38%	1,473	21.12%	6,973	-3.71%
Campbell	Santa Clara	4,160	47.12%	4,394	49.77%	275	3.11%	-234	-2.65%	8,829	-10.34%
Cupertino	Santa Clara	6,209	60.71%	3,804	37.20%	214	2.09%	2,405	23.52%	10,227	-6.30%
Gilroy	Santa Clara	2,239	47.73%	2,331	49.69%	121	2.58%	-92	-1.96%	4,691	-8.00%
Los Altos	Santa Clara	9,240	67.20%	4,243	30.86%	267	1.94%	4,997	36.34%	13,750	5.41%
Los Altos Hills	Santa Clara	2,547	66.38%	1,204	31.38%	86	2.24%	1,343	35.00%	3,837	9.47%
Los Gatos	Santa Clara	6,528	58.40%	4,373	39.12%	278	2.49%	2,155	19.28%	11,179	1.77%
Milpitas	Santa Clara	3,220	37.85%	5,041	59.26%	246	2.89%	-1,821	-21.41%	8,507	-19.37%
Monte Sereno	Santa Clara	968	64.11%	509	33.71%	33	2.19%	459	30.40%	1,510	4.74%
Morgan Hill	Santa Clara	1,653	51.03%	1,496	46.19%	90	2.78%	157	4.85%	3,239	-9.80%
Mountain View	Santa Clara	10,369	50.38%	9,673	47.00%	539	2.62%	696	3.38%	20,581	1.03%
Palo Alto	Santa Clara	13,471	48.04%	13,883	49.51%	688	2.45%	-412	-1.47%	28,042	8.48%
San Jose	Santa Clara	84,059	47.02%	90,221	50.46%	4,510	2.52%	-6,162	-3.45%	178,790	-6.16%
Santa Clara	Santa Clara	13,131	45.13%	15,214	52.29%	752	2.58%	-2,083	-7.16%	29,097	-8.03%
Saratoga	Santa Clara	9,867	69.04%	4,174	29.21%	251	1.76%	5,693	39.83%	14,292	0.86%
Sunnyvale	Santa Clara	20,369	52.60%	17,550	45.32%	802	2.07%	2,819	7.28%	38,721	-8.30%
Unincorporated Area	Santa Clara	20,712	45.93%	23,130	51.29%	1,254	2.78%	-2,418	-5.36%	45,096	-3.94%
Unapportioned Absentees	Santa Clara	10,446	58.93%	6,783	38.26%	498	2.81%	3,663	20.66%	17,727	1.23%
Capitola	Santa Cruz	1,465	43.37%	1,797	53.20%	116	3.43%	-332	-9.83%	3,378	-13.03%
Santa Cruz	Santa Cruz	6,768	36.99%	10,680	58.36%	851	4.65%	-3,912	-21.38%	18,299	-13.23%
Scotts Valley	Santa Cruz	1,632	57.67%	1,127	39.82%	71	2.51%	505	17.84%	2,830	-22.81%
Watsonville	Santa Cruz	2,391	46.03%	2,724	52.45%	79	1.52%	-333	-6.41%	5,194	-14.30%
Unincorporated Area	Santa Cruz	17,642	45.27%	19,772	50.73%	1,558	4.00%	-2,130	-5.47%	38,972	-10.20%
Unapportioned Absentees	Santa Cruz	1,974	52.51%	1,672	44.48%	113	3.01%	302	8.03%	3,759	-9.00%
Anderson	Shasta	847	40.84%	1,142	55.06%	85	4.10%	-295	-14.22%	2,074	-4.89%
Redding	Shasta	4,369	48.73%	4,327	48.26%	270	3.01%	42	0.47%	8,966	-1.08%
Unincorporated Area	Shasta	10,866	44.74%	12,580	51.80%	841	3.46%	-1,714	-7.06%	24,287	-3.60%
Unapportioned Absentees	Shasta	1,191	49.50%	1,151	47.84%	64	2.66%	40	1.66%	2,406	-14.57%
Loyalton	Sierra	154	38.50%	238	59.50%	8	2.00%	-84	-21.00%	400	-3.30%
Unincorporated Area	Sierra	423	44.02%	514	53.49%	24	2.50%	-91	-9.47%	961	-10.98%
Unapportioned Absentees	Sierra	103	50.99%	89	44.06%	10	4.95%	14	6.93%	202	-5.64%
Dorris	Siskiyou	132	45.05%	159	54.27%	2	0.68%	-27	-9.22%	293	-16.08%
Dunsmuir	Siskiyou	292	34.72%	537	63.85%	12	1.43%	-245	-29.13%	841	-18.16%
Etna	Siskiyou	160	60.38%	96	36.23%	9	3.40%	64	24.15%	265	-11.04%
Fort Jones	Siskiyou	131	55.98%	93	39.74%	10	4.27%	38	16.24%	234	-21.26%
Montague	Siskiyou	164	47.26%	177	51.01%	6	1.73%	-13	-3.75%	347	-24.92%
Mt. Shasta	Siskiyou	466	46.69%	519	52.00%	13	1.30%	-53	-5.31%	998	1.64%
Tulelake	Siskiyou	151	59.68%	98	38.74%	4	1.58%	53	20.95%	253	-23.57%
Weed	Siskiyou	363	33.70%	699	64.90%	15	1.39%	-336	-31.20%	1,077	2.59%
Yreka	Siskiyou	1,241	57.37%	884	40.87%	38	1.76%	357	16.50%	2,163	-2.06%
Unincorporated Area	Siskiyou	3,363	49.28%	3,233	47.38%	228	3.34%	130	1.91%	6,824	-8.95%
Unapportioned Absentees	Siskiyou	607	50.92%	565	47.40%	20	1.68%	42	3.52%	1,192	-11.10%
Benicia	Solano	1,853	42.81%	2,369	54.74%	106	2.45%	-516	-11.92%	4,328	-18.24%
Dixon	Solano	883	51.55%	801	46.76%	29	1.69%	82	4.79%	1,713	-18.41%
Fairfield	Solano	5,269	44.82%	6,265	53.29%	222	1.89%	-996	-8.47%	11,756	-32.03%
Rio Vista	Solano	607	50.63%	583	48.62%	9	0.75%	24	2.00%	1,199	-20.93%
Suisun City	Solano	250	33.65%	475	63.93%	18	2.42%	-225	-30.28%	743	-21.71%
Vacaville	Solano	4,836	47.93%	5,025	49.81%	228	2.26%	-189	-1.87%	10,089	-22.52%
Vallejo	Solano	8,487	36.34%	14,353	61.45%	517	2.21%	-5,866	-25.11%	23,357	-25.33%
Unincorporated Area	Solano	2,551	48.47%	2,577	48.96%	135	2.57%	-26	-0.49%	5,263	-9.83%
Unapportioned Absentees	Solano	1,400	51.66%	1,234	45.54%	76	2.80%	166	6.13%	2,710	-27.80%
Cloverdale	Sonoma	500	44.37%	601	53.33%	26	2.31%	-101	-8.96%	1,127	-24.31%
Cotati	Sonoma	302	27.18%	713	64.18%	96	8.64%	-411	-36.99%	1,111	-10.44%
Healdsburg	Sonoma	1,254	53.73%	1,019	43.66%	61	2.61%	235	10.07%	2,334	-17.15%
Petaluma	Sonoma	5,465	49.47%	5,316	48.13%	265	2.40%	149	1.35%	11,046	-19.34%
Rohnert Park	Sonoma	1,971	43.40%	2,403	52.92%	167	3.68%	-432	-9.51%	4,541	-13.08%
Santa Rosa	Sonoma	15,276	53.01%	12,836	44.54%	704	2.44%	2,440	8.47%	28,816	-10.85%
Sebastopol	Sonoma	825	44.79%	946	51.36%	71	3.85%	-121	-6.57%	1,842	-19.24%
Sonoma	Sonoma	1,515	56.47%	1,090	40.63%	78	2.91%	425	15.84%	2,683	-16.09%
Unincorporated Area	Sonoma	19,713	44.70%	22,536	51.11%	1,848	4.19%	-2,823	-6.40%	44,097	-12.24%
Unapportioned Absentees	Sonoma	3,734	54.24%	2,893	42.02%	257	3.73%	841	12.22%	6,884	-13.43%
Ceres	Stanislaus	992	37.27%	1,622	60.93%	48	1.80%	-630	-23.67%	2,662	-26.43%
Hughson	Stanislaus	255	38.75%	380	57.75%	23	3.50%	-125	-19.00%	658	N/A
Modesto	Stanislaus	12,278	45.64%	14,191	52.75%	435	1.62%	-1,913	-7.11%	26,904	-12.22%
Newman	Stanislaus	279	36.95%	460	60.93%	16	2.12%	-181	-23.97%	755	-21.78%
Oakdale	Stanislaus	1,064	43.62%	1,311	53.75%	64	2.62%	-247	-10.13%	2,439	-22.61%
Patterson	Stanislaus	462	45.88%	529	52.53%	16	1.59%	-67	-6.65%	1,007	0.23%
Riverbank	Stanislaus	249	27.24%	647	70.79%	18	1.97%	-398	-43.54%	914	-18.91%
Turlock	Stanislaus	3,101	53.59%	2,556	44.17%	130	2.25%	545	9.42%	5,787	-9.50%
Waterford	Stanislaus	245	36.24%	414	61.24%	17	2.51%	-169	-25.00%	676	-26.52%
Unincorporated Area	Stanislaus	12,365	44.27%	14,931	53.45%	637	2.28%	-2,566	-9.19%	27,933	-12.48%
Unapportioned Absentees	Stanislaus	1,647	53.08%	1,407	45.34%	49	1.58%	240	7.73%	3,103	-13.92%
Live Oak	Sutter	281	36.45%	475	61.61%	15	1.95%	-194	-25.16%	771	-39.68%
Yuba City	Sutter	2,473	51.83%	2,205	46.22%	93	1.95%	268	5.62%	4,771	-40.45%
Unincorporated Area	Sutter	5,374	56.59%	3,931	41.40%	191	2.01%	1,443	15.20%	9,496	2.93%
Unapportioned Absentees	Sutter	617	62.39%	355	35.89%	17	1.72%	262	26.49%	989	-20.30%
Corning	Tehama	635	47.04%	680	50.37%	35	2.59%	-45	-3.33%	1,350	-14.49%
Red Bluff	Tehama	1,321	42.97%	1,655	53.84%	98	3.19%	-334	-10.87%	3,074	-11.33%
Tehama	Tehama	76	35.02%	135	62.21%	6	2.76%	-59	-27.19%	217	-40.63%
Unincorporated Area	Tehama	3,558	45.06%	4,065	51.48%	273	3.46%	-507	-6.42%	7,896	-13.28%
Unapportioned Absentees	Tehama	520	51.74%	455	45.27%	30	2.99%	65	6.47%	1,005	-19.52%
Unincorporated Area	Trinity	1,989	46.16%	2,172	50.41%	148	3.43%	-183	-4.25%	4,309	-10.96%
Dinuba	Tulare	1,220	53.14%	1,054	45.91%	22	0.96%	166	7.23%	2,296	-6.14%
Exeter	Tulare	843	53.49%	716	45.43%	17	1.08%	127	8.06%	1,576	-21.16%
Farmersville	Tulare	178	25.69%	498	71.86%	17	2.45%	-320	-46.18%	693	-42.24%
Lindsay	Tulare	796	53.82%	665	44.96%	18	1.22%	131	8.86%	1,479	-12.18%
Porterville	Tulare	2,297	57.14%	1,646	40.95%	77	1.92%	651	16.19%	4,020	-8.30%
Tulare	Tulare	2,108	41.64%	2,907	57.42%	48	0.95%	-799	-15.78%	5,063	-17.28%
Visalia	Tulare	7,829	60.44%	4,989	38.52%	135	1.04%	2,840	21.93%	12,953	-8.51%
Woodlake	Tulare	287	40.20%	414	57.98%	13	1.82%	-127	-17.79%	714	-16.81%
Unincorporated Area	Tulare	14,763	54.69%	11,778	43.64%	451	1.67%	2,985	11.06%	26,992	-14.29%
Unapportioned Absentees	Tulare	1,543	62.90%	884	36.04%	26	1.06%	659	26.87%	2,453	-14.26%
Sonora	Tuolumne	847	50.69%	798	47.76%	26	1.56%	49	2.93%	1,671	-11.04%
Unincorporated Area	Tuolumne	4,741	46.15%	5,306	51.64%	227	2.21%	-565	-5.50%	10,274	-15.14%
Unapportioned Absentees	Tuolumne	516	55.25%	388	41.54%	30	3.21%	128	13.70%	934	-14.96%
Camarillo	Ventura (Note: The sum of Maddox’s votes across Ventura County municipalities is 2 fewer than the official county-wide tally.)	6,131	60.90%	3,787	37.61%	150	1.49%	2,344	23.28%	10,068	-23.02%
Fillmore	Ventura	1,026	47.24%	1,108	51.01%	38	1.75%	-82	-3.78%	2,172	-23.67%
Ojai	Ventura	1,315	50.60%	1,239	47.67%	45	1.73%	76	2.92%	2,599	-18.00%
Oxnard	Ventura	9,785	44.17%	11,978	54.07%	391	1.76%	-2,193	-9.90%	22,154	-29.51%
Port Hueneme	Ventura	1,962	50.00%	1,900	48.42%	62	1.58%	62	1.58%	3,924	-33.12%
Santa Paula	Ventura	2,525	46.35%	2,860	52.50%	63	1.16%	-335	-6.15%	5,448	-18.87%
Simi Valley	Ventura	11,725	55.39%	9,003	42.53%	440	2.08%	2,722	12.86%	21,168	-26.21%
Thousand Oaks	Ventura	14,096	62.95%	7,964	35.56%	334	1.49%	6,132	27.38%	22,394	-14.49%
Ventura	Ventura	13,872	51.28%	12,762	47.18%	417	1.54%	1,110	4.10%	27,051	-19.76%
Unincorporated Area	Ventura	15,149	53.05%	12,860	45.03%	547	1.92%	2,289	8.02%	28,556	-19.17%
Unapportioned Absentees	Ventura	5,084	61.09%	3,068	36.87%	170	2.04%	2,016	24.22%	8,322	-18.19%
Davis	Yolo	7,317	41.59%	9,940	56.50%	336	1.91%	-2,623	-14.91%	17,593	16.87%
Winters	Yolo	312	38.61%	477	59.03%	19	2.35%	-165	-20.42%	808	-25.23%
Woodland	Yolo	4,690	50.44%	4,454	47.90%	154	1.66%	236	2.54%	9,298	-10.18%
Unincorporated Area	Yolo	6,057	40.27%	8,662	57.59%	321	2.13%	-2,605	-17.32%	15,040	-6.49%
Marysville	Yuba	1,793	52.67%	1,560	45.83%	51	1.50%	233	6.84%	3,404	-21.71%
Wheatland	Yuba	231	47.93%	247	51.24%	4	0.83%	-16	-3.32%	482	-18.67%
Unincorporated Area	Yuba	3,068	40.35%	4,352	57.23%	184	2.42%	-1,284	-16.89%	7,604	-28.33%
Unapportioned Absentees	Yuba	404	56.90%	292	41.13%	14	1.97%	112	15.77%	710	-32.47%
Totals (Note: Statewide candidate vote percentages and the total vote number differ here because California's Supplement to Statement of Vote does not count write in votes as part of the city totals. Vote totals of candidates differ due to discrepancies in county totals mentioned in other notes.)		3,882,244	49.75%	3,742,284	47.95%	179,240	2.30%	139,960	1.79%	7,803,768	-11.81%

==== Cities & Unincorporated Areas that flipped from Democratic to Republican ====
- Amador City (Amador)
- Chico (Butte)
- Sausalito (Marin)

==== Cities & Unincorporated Areas that flipped from Republican to Democratic ====
- Fremont (Alameda)
- Newark (Alameda)
- San Leandro (Alameda)
- Unincorporated Area (Alameda)
- Ione (Amador)
- Plymouth (Amador)
- Unincorporated Area (Amador)
- Biggs (Butte)
- Angels (Calaveras)
- Williams (Colusa)
- Concord (Contra Costa)
- Martinez (Contra Costa)
- Pinole (Contra Costa)
- Crescent City (Del Norte)
- Unincorporated Area (Del Norte)
- Placerville (El Dorado)
- South Lake Tahoe (El Dorado)
- Unincorporated Area (El Dorado)
- Clovis (Fresno)
- Coalinga (Fresno)
- Kerman (Fresno)
- Selma (Fresno)
- Unincorporated Area (Glenn)
- Eureka (Humboldt)
- Trinidad (Humboldt)
- Unincorporated Area (Humboldt)
- Calipatria (Imperial)
- Imperial (Imperial)
- California City (Kern)
- Delano (Kern)
- Maricopa (Kern)
- McFarland (Kern)
- Wasco (Kern)
- Unincorporated Area (Kings)
- Unincorporated Area (Lake)
- Unincorporated Area (Lassen)
- Artesia (Los Angeles)
- Azusa (Los Angeles)
- Baldwin Park (Los Angeles)
- Bell Gardens (Los Angeles)
- Bell (Los Angeles)
- Bellflower (Los Angeles)
- Cudahy (Los Angeles)
- Culver City (Los Angeles)
- El Monte (Los Angeles)
- Gardena (Los Angeles)
- Huntington Park (Los Angeles)
- Inglewood (Los Angeles)
- Lawndale (Los Angeles)
- Lynwood (Los Angeles)
- Maywood (Los Angeles)
- Montebello (Los Angeles)
- Monterey Park (Los Angeles)
- Norwalk (Los Angeles)
- Paramount (Los Angeles)
- Pomona (Los Angeles)
- Rosemead (Los Angeles)
- San Fernando (Los Angeles)
- Santa Fe Springs (Los Angeles)
- Santa Monica (Los Angeles)
- Signal Hill (Los Angeles)
- South Gate (Los Angeles)
- Chowchilla (Madera)
- Unincorporated Area (Mariposa)
- Willits (Mendocino)
- Unincorporated Area (Mendocino)
- Atwater (Merced)
- Merced (Merced)
- Unincorporated Area (Merced)
- Alturas (Modoc)
- Gonzales (Monterey)
- Greenfield (Monterey)
- Pacific Grove (Monterey)
- Sand City (Monterey)
- Napa (Napa)
- Yountville (Napa)
- Nevada City (Nevada)
- Unincorporated Area (Placer)
- Unincorporated Area (Plumas)
- Banning (Riverside)
- Beaumont (Riverside)
- Blythe (Riverside)
- Desert Hot Springs (Riverside)
- Indio (Riverside)
- Riverside (Riverside)
- San Jacinto (Riverside)
- Unincorporated Area (Riverside)
- Folsom (Sacramento)
- Galt (Sacramento)
- Unincorporated Area (Sacramento)
- Hollister (San Benito)
- Adelanto (San Bernardino)
- Barstow (San Bernardino)
- Fontana (San Bernardino)
- Montclair (San Bernardino)
- Needles (San Bernardino)
- Ontario (San Bernardino)
- Rialto (San Bernardino)
- San Bernardino (San Bernardino)
- Imperial Beach (San Diego)
- National City (San Diego)
- Manteca (San Joaquin)
- Stockton (San Joaquin)
- Tracy (San Joaquin)
- San Bruno (San Mateo)
- Carpinteria (Santa Barbara)
- Guadalupe (Santa Barbara)
- Lompoc (Santa Barbara)
- Santa Barbara (Santa Barbara)
- Campbell (Santa Clara)
- Gilroy (Santa Clara)
- San Jose (Santa Clara)
- Santa Clara (Santa Clara)
- Capitola (Santa Cruz)
- Watsonville (Santa Cruz)
- Unincorporated Area (Santa Cruz)
- Unincorporated Area (Sierra)
- Dorris (Siskiyou)
- Montague (Siskiyou)
- Benicia (Solano)
- Fairfield (Solano)
- Vacaville (Solano)
- Vallejo (Solano)
- Unincorporated Area (Solano)
- Cloverdale (Sonoma)
- Rohnert Park (Sonoma)
- Sebastopol (Sonoma)
- Unincorporated Area (Sonoma)
- Ceres (Stanislaus)
- Modesto (Stanislaus)
- Oakdale (Stanislaus)
- Waterford (Stanislaus)
- Unincorporated Area (Stanislaus)
- Live Oak (Sutter)
- Corning (Tehama)
- Red Bluff (Tehama)
- Tehama (Tehama)
- Unincorporated Area (Tehama)
- Unincorporated Area (Trinity)
- Tulare (Tulare)
- Unincorporated Area (Tuolumne)
- Fillmore (Ventura)
- Oxnard (Ventura)
- Santa Paula (Ventura)
- Winters (Yolo)
- Wheatland (Yuba)
- Unincorporated Area (Yuba)

=== Results by congressional district ===
Despite losing the state, Carter won 22 of the state's 43 congressional districts, including one which elected a Republican, while the remaining 21 districts were won by Ford, including 8 which elected Democrats.

District	Ford	Carter	Representative
1st	49.2%	50.8%	Harold T. Johnson
2nd	48.9%	51.1%	Donald H. Clausen
3rd	47.2%	52.8%	John E. Moss
4th	44.3%	55.7%	Robert Leggett
5th	50.4%	49.6%	John L. Burton
6th	42.7%	57.3%	Phillip Burton
7th	47.6%	52.4%	George Miller
8th	40.8%	59.2%	Ron Dellums
9th	44%	56%	Pete Stark
10th	41.4%	58.6%	Don Edwards
11th	52.7%	47.3%	Leo Ryan
12th	53.5%	46.5%	Pete McCloskey
13th	54.3%	45.7%	Norman Mineta
14th	50%	50%	John J. McFall
15th	45%	55%	B.F. Sisk
16th	50.4%	49.6%	Burt Talcott
16th	50.4%	49.6%	Leon Panetta
17th	53.5%	46.5%	John Hans Krebs
18th	56%	44%	William M. Ketchum
19th	50.9%	49.1%	Bob Lagomarsino
20th	59.9%	40.1%	Barry Goldwater Jr.
21st	47.8%	52.2%	James C. Corman
22nd	61.8%	38.2%	Carlos Moorhead
23rd	47.1%	52.9%	Tom Rees
23rd	47.1%	52.9%	Anthony Beilenson
24th	44.2%	55.8%	Henry Waxman
25th	36.6%	63.4%	Edward R. Roybal
26th	62.1%	37.9%	John H. Rousselot
27th	60.2%	39.8%	Alphonzo E. Bell Jr.
27th	60.2%	39.8%	Bob Dornan
28th	29.1%	70.9%	Yvonne Burke
29th	19%	81%	Augustus Hawkins
30th	39.9%	60.1%	George E. Danielson
31st	34.3%	65.7%	Charles H. Wilson
32nd	44.5%	55.5%	Glenn M. Anderson
33rd	56.7%	43.3%	Del M. Clawson
34th	56.9%	43.1%	Mark W. Hannaford
35th	55.6%	44.4%	James F. Lloyd
36th	44%	56%	George Brown Jr.
37th	54.6%	45.4%	Shirley Neil Pettis
38th	55.8%	44.2%	Jerry M. Patterson
39th	64.2%	35.8%	Charles E. Wiggins
40th	67.7%	32.3%	Andrew J. Hinshaw
40th	67.7%	32.3%	Robert Badham
41st	57.4%	42.6%	Bob Wilson
42nd	47.2%	52.8%	Lionel Van Deerlin
43rd	60%	40%	Clair Burgener
