= 1972 United States House of Representatives elections in California =

- November 7, 1972

All 43 California seats to the United States House of Representatives
	Majority party	Minority party
Party	Democratic	Republican
Last election	20	18
Seats won	23	20
Seat change	▲3	▲2
Popular vote	4,154,984	3,719,898
Percentage	51.94%	46.50%
- Democratic gain Republican gain Democratic hold Republican hold

The United States House of Representatives elections in California, 1972 was an election for California's delegation to the United States House of Representatives, which occurred as part of the general election of the House of Representatives on November 7, 1972. California gained five seats as a result of the 1970 census, three of which were won by Democrats and two by Republicans. Of California's existing House seats, none switched parties.

== Overview ==
United States House of Representatives elections in California, 1972
Party	Votes	%	Before	After	+/–
Democratic	4,154,984	51.94%	20	23	+3
Republican	3,719,898	46.50%	18	20	+2
American Independent	65,684	0.82%	0	0	0
Peace and Freedom	59,600	0.74%	0	0	0
Totals	8,000,166	100.00%	38	43	+5

== Results ==
Final results from the Clerk of the House of Representatives:

=== District 1 ===
California's 1st congressional district election, 1972
Party	Candidate	Votes	%
Republican	Don H. Clausen (incumbent)	140,807	62.26
Democratic	William A. Nighswonger	77,138	34.11
Peace and Freedom	Jonathan T. Ames	8,470	3.75
Total votes		226,145	100.00
Turnout			
Republican hold			

=== District 2 ===
California's 2nd congressional district election, 1972
Party	Candidate	Votes	%
Democratic	Harold T. Johnson (incumbent)	148,808	68.30
Republican	Francis X. Callahan	62,381	28.63
American Independent	Dorothy D. Paradis	6,688	3.07
Total votes		217,877	100.00
Turnout			
Democratic hold			

=== District 3 ===
California's 3rd congressional district election, 1972
Party	Candidate	Votes	%
Democratic	John E. Moss (incumbent)	151,035	69.93
Republican	John Rakus	64,949	30.07
Total votes		215,984	100.00
Turnout			
Democratic hold			

=== District 4 ===
California's 4th congressional district election, 1972
Party	Candidate	Votes	%
Democratic	Robert L. Leggett (incumbent)	114,673	67.44
Republican	Benjamin Chang	55,367	32.56
Total votes		170,040	100.00
Turnout			
Democratic hold			

=== District 5 ===
California's 5th congressional district election, 1972
Party	Candidate	Votes	%
Democratic	Phillip Burton (incumbent)	120,819	81.75
Republican	Edlo E. Powell	26,963	18.25
Total votes		147,782	100.00
Turnout			
Democratic hold			

=== District 6 ===
California's 6th congressional district election, 1972
Party	Candidate	Votes	%
Republican	William S. Mailliard (incumbent)	118,197	52.04
Democratic	John Roger Boas	108,934	47.96
Total votes		227,131	100.00
Turnout			
Republican hold			

=== District 7 ===
California's 7th congressional district election, 1972
Party	Candidate	Votes	%
Democratic	Ron Dellums (incumbent)	126,351	56.00
Republican	Peter Hannaford	85,851	38.05
American Independent	Frank V. Cortese	13,430	5.95
Total votes		225,632	100.00
Turnout			
Democratic hold			

=== District 8 ===
California's 8th congressional district election, 1972
Party	Candidate	Votes	%
Democratic	Pete Stark	101,024	52.90
Republican	Lew M. Warden, Jr.	89,948	47.10
Total votes		190,972	100.00
Turnout			
Democratic hold			

=== District 9 ===
California's 9th congressional district election, 1972
Party	Candidate	Votes	%
Democratic	Don Edwards (incumbent)	123,837	72.26
Republican	Herb Smith	43,134	25.17
American Independent	Edmon V. Kaiser	4,403	2.57
Total votes		171,374	100
Turnout			
Democratic hold			

=== District 10 ===
California's 10th congressional district election, 1972
Party	Candidate	Votes	%
Republican	Charles S. Gubser	139,850	64.61
Democratic	B. Frank Gillette	76,597	35.39
Total votes		216,447	100.00
Turnout			
Republican hold			

=== District 11 ===
California's 11th congressional district election, 1972
Party	Candidate	Votes	%
Democratic	Leo Ryan	113,580	60.39
Republican	Charles E. Chase	69,655	37.03
American Independent	Nicholas Waeil Kudrovzeff	4,852	2.58
Total votes		188,087	100.00
Turnout			
Democratic win (new seat)			

=== District 12 ===
California's 12th congressional district election, 1972
Party	Candidate	Votes	%
Republican	Burt L. Talcott (incumbent)	105,555	53.97
Democratic	Julian Camacho	84,268	43.09
American Independent	Stanley K. Monteith	5,753	2.94
Total votes		195,576	100.00
Turnout			
Republican hold			

=== District 13 ===
California's 13th congressional district election, 1972
Party	Candidate	Votes	%
Republican	Charles M. Teague (incumbent)	153,723	73.92
Democratic	Lester Dean Cleveland	54,237	27.08
Total votes		207,960	100.00
Turnout			
Republican hold			

=== District 14 ===
California's 14th congressional district election, 1972
Party	Candidate	Votes	%
Democratic	Jerome Waldie (incumbent)	158,948	77.56
Republican	Floyd E. Sims	45,985	22.44
Total votes		204,933	100.00
Turnout			
Democratic hold			

=== District 15 ===
California's 15th congressional district election, 1972
Party	Candidate	Votes	%
Democratic	John J. McFall (incumbent)	145,273	100.00
Turnout			
Democratic hold			

=== District 16 ===
California's 16th congressional district election, 1972
Party	Candidate	Votes	%
Democratic	Bernice F. Sisk (incumbent)	134,079	79.12
Republican	Carol Harner	35,384	20.88
Total votes		169,463	100.00
Turnout			
Democratic hold			

=== District 17 ===
California's 17th congressional district election, 1972
Party	Candidate	Votes	%
Republican	Pete McCloskey (incumbent)	110,098	60.21
Democratic	James Stewart	72,759	39.79
Total votes		182,857	100.00
Turnout			
Republican hold			

=== District 18 ===
California's 18th congressional district election, 1972
Party	Candidate	Votes	%
Republican	Bob Mathias (incumbent)	109,993	66.47
Democratic	Vincent J. Lavery	55,484	33.53
Total votes		165,477	100.00
Turnout			
Republican hold			

=== District 19 ===
California's 19th congressional district election, 1972
Party	Candidate	Votes	%
Democratic	Chet Holifield (incumbent)	103,823	67.22
Republican	Kenneth M. Fisher	43,034	27.86
Peace and Freedom	Joe Harris	7,588	4.91
Total votes		154,445	100.00
Turnout			
Democratic hold			

=== District 20 ===
California's 20th congressional district election, 1972
Party	Candidate	Votes	%
Republican	Carlos J. Moorhead	120,299	57.42
Democratic	John Binkley	89,219	42.58
Total votes		209,518	100.00
Turnout			
Republican hold			

=== District 21 ===
California's 21st congressional district election, 1972
Party	Candidate	Votes	%
Democratic	Augustus F. Hawkins (incumbent)	92,799	82.87
Republican	Rayfield Lundy	19,187	17.13
Total votes		111,986	100.00
Turnout			
Democratic hold			

=== District 22 ===
California's 22nd congressional district election, 1972
Party	Candidate	Votes	%
Democratic	James C. Corman (incumbent)	121,352	67.57
Republican	Bruce P. Wolfe	52,664	29.32
Peace and Freedom	Ralph L. Shroyer	5,583	3.11
Total votes		179,599	100.00
Turnout			
Democratic hold			

=== District 23 ===
California's 23rd congressional district election, 1972
Party	Candidate	Votes	%
Republican	Del M. Clawson (incumbent)	118,731	61.43
Democratic	Conrad G. Tuohey	74,561	38.57
Total votes		193,292	100.00
Turnout			
Republican hold			

=== District 24 ===
California's 24th congressional district election, 1972
Party	Candidate	Votes	%
Republican	John H. Rousselot (incumbent)	141,274	70.13
Democratic	Luther Mandell	60,170	29.87
Total votes		201,444	100.00
Turnout			
Republican hold			

=== District 25 ===
California's 25th congressional district election, 1972
Party	Candidate	Votes	%
Republican	Charles E. Wiggins (incumbent)	115,908	67.60
Democratic	Leslie W. "Les" Craven	50,015	29.17
American Independent	Alfred Romirez	5,541	3.23
Total votes		171,464	100.00
Turnout			
Republican hold			

=== District 26 ===
California's 26th congressional district election, 1972
Party	Candidate	Votes	%
Democratic	Thomas M. Rees (incumbent)	160,932	68.63
Republican	Philip Robert Rutta	65,473	27.92
Peace and Freedom	Mike Timko	8,094	3.45
Total votes		234,499	100.00
Turnout			
Democratic hold			

=== District 27 ===
California's 27th congressional district election, 1972
Party	Candidate	Votes	%
Republican	Barry Goldwater, Jr. (incumbent)	117,622	57.40
Democratic	Mark S. Novak	87,295	42.60
Total votes		204,917	100.00
Turnout			
Republican hold			

=== District 28 ===
California's 28th congressional district election, 1972
Party	Candidate	Votes	%
Republican	Alphonzo E. Bell, Jr. (incumbent)	142,102	60.71
Democratic	Michael Shapiro	87,783	37.50
Peace and Freedom	Jack Hampton	4,184	1.79
Total votes		234,069	100.00
Turnout			
Republican hold			

=== District 29 ===
California's 29th congressional district election, 1972
Party	Candidate	Votes	%
Democratic	George E. Danielson (incumbent)	91,553	62.78
Republican	Richard E. Ferraro	48,814	33.48
Peace and Freedom	John W. Blaine	5,455	3.74
Total votes		145,822	100.00
Turnout			
Democratic hold			

=== District 30 ===
California's 30th congressional district election, 1972
Party	Candidate	Votes	%
Democratic	Edward R. Roybal (incumbent)	76,521	68.39
Republican	Bill Brophy	32,005	28.61
Peace and Freedom	Lewis McCammon	3,355	3.00
Total votes		111,881	100.00
Turnout			
Democratic hold			

=== District 31 ===
California's 31st congressional district election, 1972
Party	Candidate	Votes	%
Democratic	Charles H. Wilson (incumbent)	85,954	52.28
Republican	Ben Valentine	69,876	42.50
Peace and Freedom	Roberta Lynn Wood	8,582	5.22
Total votes		164,412	100.00
Turnout			
Democratic hold			

=== District 32 ===
California's 32nd congressional district election, 1972
Party	Candidate	Votes	%
Republican	Craig Hosmer (incumbent)	147,016	65.86
Democratic	Dennis Murray	71,394	31.98
Peace and Freedom	John S. Donohue	4,804	2.15
Total votes		223,214	100.00
Turnout			
Republican hold			

=== District 33 ===
California's 33rd congressional district election, 1972
Party	Candidate	Votes	%
Republican	Jerry Pettis (incumbent)	140,304	75.06
Democratic	Ken Thompson	46,626	24.94
Total votes		186,930	100.00
Turnout			
Republican hold			

=== District 34 ===
California's 34th congressional district election, 1972
Party	Candidate	Votes	%
Democratic	Richard T. Hanna (incumbent)	113,841	67.22
Republican	John D. Ratterree	48,916	28.88
American Independent	Lee R. Rayburn	6,604	3.90
Total votes		169,361	100.00
Turnout			
Democratic hold			

=== District 35 ===
California's 35th congressional district election, 1972
Party	Candidate	Votes	%
Democratic	Glenn M. Anderson (incumbent)	103,912	74.79
Republican	Vernon E. Brown	35,018	25.21
Total votes		138,930	100.00
Turnout			
Democratic hold			

=== District 36 ===
California's 36th congressional district election, 1972
Party	Candidate	Votes	%
Republican	William M. Ketchum	87,984	52.75
Democratic	Timothy Lemucchi	72,516	43.47
American Independent	William M. "Bill" Armour	6,307	3.78
Total votes		166,807	100.00
Turnout			
Republican win (new seat)			

=== District 37 ===
California's 37th congressional district election, 1972
Party	Candidate	Votes	%
Democratic	Yvonne Brathwaite Burke	120,392	73.18
Republican	Greg Tria	40,633	24.70
Peace and Freedom	John Hagg	3,485	2.12
Total votes		164,510	100.00
Turnout			
Democratic win (new seat)			

=== District 38 ===
California's 38th congressional district election, 1972
Party	Candidate	Votes	%
Democratic	George Brown, Jr.	77,776	56.30
Republican	Howard J. Snider	60,379	43.70
Total votes		138,155	100.00
Turnout			
Democratic win (new seat)			

=== District 39 ===
California's 39th congressional district election, 1972
Party	Candidate	Votes	%
Republican	Andrew J. Hinshaw	146,911	65.70
Democratic	John Woodland Black	76,695	34.30
Total votes		223,606	100.00
Turnout			
Republican hold			

=== District 40 ===
California's 40th congressional district election, 1972
Party	Candidate	Votes	%
Republican	Bob Wilson (incumbent)	153,648	67.77
Democratic	Frank Caprio	68,771	30.33
American Independent	Fritjof Thygeson	4,294	1.89
Total votes		226,713	100.00
Turnout			
Republican hold			

=== District 41 ===
California's 41st congressional district election, 1972
Party	Candidate	Votes	%
Democratic	Lionel Van Deerlin (incumbent)	115,634	74.05
Republican	D. Richard "Dick" Kau	40,514	25.95
Total votes		156,148	100.00
Turnout			
Democratic hold			

=== District 42 ===
California's 42nd congressional district election, 1972
Party	Candidate	Votes	%
Republican	Clair Burgener	155,965	67.44
Democratic	Bob Lowe	67,477	29.18
American Independent	Armin R. Moths	7,812	3.38
Total votes		231,254	100.00
Turnout			
Republican win (new seat)			

=== District 43 ===
California's 43rd congressional district election, 1972
Party	Candidate	Votes	%
Republican	Victor Veysey (incumbent)	117,781	62.68
Democratic	Ernest Z. Robles	70,129	37.32
Total votes		187,910	100.00
Turnout			
Republican win (new seat)			

== See also ==
- 93rd United States Congress
- Political party strength in U.S. states
- Political party strength in California
- 1972 United States House of Representatives elections
