= Robert Badham =

American politician (1929–2005)

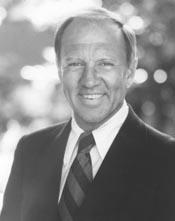

Member of the U.S. House of Representatives from California's 40th district
- In office January 3, 1977 – January 3, 1989
- Preceded by: Andrew J. Hinshaw
- Succeeded by: Christopher Cox

Member of the California State Assembly
- In office January 7, 1963 – November 30, 1976
- Preceded by: Walter M. Ingalls (74th); Gordon Cologne (71st)
- Succeeded by: Ronald Cordova (74th); Paul B. Carpenter (71st)
- Constituency: 71st district (1963–1975); 74th district (1975–1977)

Personal details
- Born: Robert Edward Badham; June 9, 1929 Los Angeles, California, U.S.
- Died: October 21, 2005 (aged 76) Newport Beach, California, U.S.
- Resting place: Riverside National Cemetery
- Party: Republican
- Spouse: Anne Badham
- Children: 5
- Profession: Business executive

Military service
- Branch/service: United States Navy
- Battles/wars: Korean War

Robert Edward Badham (June 9, 1929 – October 21, 2005) was an American businessman, Korean War veteran, and politician from California. He served as a Republican member of the United States House of Representatives from the Orange County-based 40th district from 1977 to 1989.

== Biography ==
Born in Los Angeles, California, Badham graduated from Beverly Hills High School in 1947, and earned his B.A. from Stanford University in 1951. During the Korean War, he served active duty in the United States Naval Reserve. After returning home, he became an executive in his family's Hoffman Hardware Company in Los Angeles.

Badham entered politics in 1962 when he was elected to the California State Assembly where he would serve for fourteen years. As an assemblyman, he co-authored legislation to create personalized license plates and fought to protect tide pools along the Southern California coast. In addition, he was a delegate to the California State Republican conventions during his tenure in the state legislature and was a delegate to the Republican National Conventions from 1964 to 1984.

=== Congress ===
In 1976, Badham entered a crowded Republican primary for the U.S. House of Representatives in California's 40th congressional district and won with 32% of the vote, besting eight other candidates including former congressman John G. Schmitz and incumbent Andrew J. Hinshaw. He easily won the general election in November, and was reelected five more times in the heavily Republican district which included Irvine and his home of Newport Beach. In Congress, he served as a ranking member on the House Armed Services Committee and was representative to the NATO Parliamentary Assembly.

=== Later career ===
After retiring from Congress, Badham remained active, serving on the California Board of Accountancy, as vice chairman of the Newport Beach Civil Service Board, and helping to raise money for Hoag Hospital.

== Death and burial ==
He died on October 21, 2005, after suffering a heart attack at Balboa Island post office. He was buried at Riverside National Cemetery in Riverside, California.

== Electoral history ==
1976 United States House of Representatives elections in California
Party	Candidate	Votes	%
Republican	Robert Badham	148,512	59.3
Democratic	Vivian Hall	102,132	40.7
Total votes		250,644	100.0
Republican hold			

1978 United States House of Representatives elections in California
Party	Candidate	Votes	%
Republican	Robert Badham (Incumbent)	147,882	65.9
Democratic	Jim McGuy	76,358	34.1
Total votes		224,240	100.0
Republican hold			

1980 United States House of Representatives elections in California
Party	Candidate	Votes	%
Republican	Robert Badham (Incumbent)	213,999	70.2
Democratic	Michael F. Dow	66,512	21.8
Libertarian	Dan Mahaffey	24,486	8.0
Total votes		304,997	100.0
Republican hold			

1982 United States House of Representatives elections in California
Party	Candidate	Votes	%
Republican	Robert Badham (Incumbent)	144,228	71.5
Democratic	Paul Hasenman	52,546	26.1
Peace and Freedom	Maxine Bell Quirk	4,826	2.4
Total votes		201,600	100.0
Republican hold			

1984 United States House of Representatives elections in California
Party	Candidate	Votes	%
Republican	Robert Badham (Incumbent)	164,257	64.4
Democratic	Carol Ann Bradford	86,748	34.0
Peace and Freedom	Maxine Bell Quirk	3,969	1.6
Total votes		254,974	100.0
Republican hold			

1986 United States House of Representatives elections in California
Party	Candidate	Votes	%
Republican	Robert Badham (Incumbent)	119,829	59.8
Democratic	Bruce W. Sumner	75,664	37.7
Peace and Freedom	Steve Sears	5,025	2.5
Total votes		200,518	100.0
Republican hold			

== See also ==
U.S. House of Representatives
Preceded by Andrew J. Hinshaw	Member of the U.S. House of Representatives from California's 40th congressional district 1977–1989	Succeeded by Christopher Cox
