= Andrew J. Hinshaw =

American politician (1923–2016)

Andrew Hinshaw
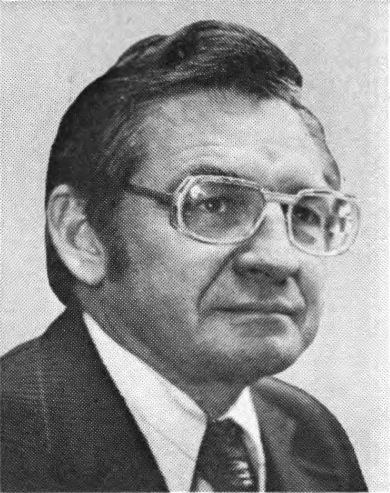

Member of the U.S. House of Representatives from California
- In office January 3, 1973 – January 3, 1977
- Preceded by: Constituency established
- Succeeded by: Robert Badham
- Constituency: 39th district (1973–1975); 40th district (1975–1977)

Personal details
- Born: Andrew Jackson Hinshaw; August 4, 1923 Dexter, Missouri, U.S.
- Died: January 21, 2016 (aged 92) San Bernardino County, California, U.S.
- Party: Republican
- Education: University of Southern California (BS)

Andrew Jackson Hinshaw (August 4, 1923 – January 21, 2016) was an American politician who served as a congressman for California between 1973 and 1977. In 1977 he was convicted of accepting bribes from the Tandy Corporation in his previous job as Orange County, California, assessor.

== Biography ==
Hinshaw was born in Dexter, Missouri, and attended public schools in Michigan and Los Angeles, California. He was in the Navy in World War II from 1942 to 1945. He received a B.S. degree from the University of Southern California in 1950 and attended the USC Law School.

== Political career ==
Hinshaw worked for 10 years for the California State Board of Equalization and five years for the Los Angeles County Assessor's Office. He entered politics as the Property Assessor of Orange County, California, serving from 1965 to 1972. This had been a controversial office and there had been calls from Orange County grand juries to change the extremely lenient treatment given to large landowners.

=== Congress ===
In 1972 Hinshaw entered the Republican primary for California's 39th Congressional District in the United States House of Representatives. The district, which had been the 35th District prior to redistricting, was represented by outspoken conservative John G. Schmitz. Hinshaw, considered a moderate Republican by Orange County standards, was personally recruited by President Richard Nixon, whose home in San Clemente was in the district, after Schmitz suggested that Nixon should not have returned from his 1972 visit to China.

Hinshaw scored a considerable upset in the Republican primary election, narrowly defeating Schmitz by 2.7 percentage points. This was tantamount to election in what has long been considered the most Republican district in California. Hinshaw was reelected in 1974 but was defeated in the 1976 primary by State Assemblyman Robert Badham, who won the general election.

== Arrest and conviction ==
In 1976 Hinshaw was accused of twelve counts of accepting bribes from the Tandy Corporation while he had been Assessor of Orange County as well as using county employees, staff and supplies for his 1972 Campaign for Congress. He was found guilty and sentenced to one to fourteen years in prison, serving eight months.

== Death ==
Hinshaw died on January 21, 2016, at the age of 92.

== Electoral history ==
1972 United States House of Representatives elections in California
Party	Candidate	Votes	%
Republican	Andrew J. Hinshaw	146,911	65.7
Democratic	John Woodland Black	76,695	43.3
Total votes		223,606	100.0
Republican hold			

1974 United States House of Representatives elections in California
Party	Candidate	Votes	%
Republican	Andrew J. Hinshaw (Incumbent)	114,895	63.4
Democratic	Roderick J. "Rod" Wilson	56,195	30.9
American Independent	Grayson L. Watkins	10,381	5.7
Total votes		181,471	100.0
Republican hold			

== See also ==
- List of federal political scandals in the United States

U.S. House of Representatives
New constituency	Member of the U.S. House of Representatives from California's 39th congressional district 1973–1975	Succeeded by Charles E. Wiggins
Preceded by Bob Wilson	Member of the U.S. House of Representatives from California's 40th congressional district 1975–1977	Succeeded by Robert E. Badham
