= California's 40th congressional district =

U.S. House district for California

Coordinates: 33°53′41″N 117°55′23″W

- Interactive map of district boundaries
- Representative: Young Kim; R–Anaheim Hills
- Population (2025): 743,207
- Median household income: $136,516
- Ethnicity: 48.5% White; 25.2% Hispanic; 19.0% Asian; 4.8% Two or more races; 1.6% Black; 0.5% other
- Cook PVI: R+6

California's 40th congressional district is a congressional district in the U.S. state of California, encompassing Orange, San Bernardino, and Riverside counties. The district is currently represented by Republican Young Kim. It was one of 18 districts that would have voted for Joe Biden in the 2020 presidential election had they existed in their current configuration while being won or held by a Republican in 2022.

The district includes Yorba Linda, Anaheim Hills, Orange, Chino Hills, Tustin, Mission Viejo, Aliso Viejo, Rancho Santa Margarita, Laguna Hills, Laguna Woods, Villa Park, Lake Forest, the unincorporated communities of North Tustin and Coto de Caza, and parts of Brea and Corona.

== Recent election results from statewide races ==
Year	Office	Results
2008	President	McCain 56% - 44%
2010	Governor	Whitman 63% - 32%
2010	Lt. Governor	Maldonado 53% - 33%
2010	Secretary of State	Dunn 61% - 32%
2010	Attorney General	Cooley 66% - 26%
2010	Treasurer	Walters 58% - 35%
2010	Controller	Strickland 60% - 32%
2012	President	Romney 58% - 39%
2014	Governor	Kashkari 62% - 38%
2016	President	Trump 49% - 45%
2018	Governor	Cox 56% - 44%
2018	Attorney General	Bailey 54% - 46%
2020	President	Biden 50% - 48%
2022	Senate (Reg.)	Meuser 54% - 46%
2022	Governor	Dahle 55% - 45%
2022	Lt. Governor	Underwood Jacobs 55% - 45%
2022	Secretary of State	Bernosky 55% - 45%
2022	Attorney General	Hochman 56% - 44%
2022	Treasurer	Guerrero 56% - 44%
2022	Controller	Chen 59% - 41%
2024	President	Trump 49% - 47%
2024	Senate (Reg.)	Garvey 54% - 46%

== Composition ==
FIPS County Code	County	Seat	Population
59	Orange	Santa Ana	3,135,755
65	Riverside	Riverside	2,492,442
71	San Bernardino	San Bernardino	2,195,611

Under the 2020 redistricting, California's 40th congressional district is located in Southern California, taking up the majority of northern and eastern Orange County, and parts of southwestern San Bernardino and western Riverside Counties. The area in Orange County includes the cities of Tustin, Yorba Linda, Lake Forest, Laguna Woods, Laguna Hills, Mission Viejo, Rancho Santa Margarita, Brea, Villa Park, Aliso Viejo, eastern Orange, and eastern Anaheim; and the census-designated places North Tustin, Silverado, Williams Canyon, Modjeska, Trabuco Canyon and Coto de Caza. The area in San Bernardino County includes most of the city of Chino Hills.

Orange County is split between this district, the 38th district, the 45th district, the 46th district, the 47th district, and the 49th district. The 40th and 45th are partitioned by Orange Freeway, E Lambert Rd, Sunrise Rd, Foothill Ln, Wandering Ln, N Associated Rd, E Birch St, S Valencia Ave, La Plaza Dr, La Floresta Dr, La Crescenta Dr, Highway 90, 1053 E Imperial Highway-343 Tolbert St, Vesuvius Dr, Rose Dr, Wabash Ave, 6th St, Golden Ave, Carbon Canyon Creek, E Yorba Linda Blvd, Jefferson St, 1401 Zion Ave-N Van Buren St, Buena Vista Ave, 17225 Orange Blossom Ln-1480 E Howard Pl, 17511 Pine Cir-Orchard Dr, Mariposa Ave, Lakeview Ave, E Miraloma Ave, Fee-Ana St, Sierra Madre Cir, E Orangethorpe Ave, Burlington Northern Santa Fe Railroad, Kensington Ave, N Kraemer Blvd, Carbon Creek, and E La Jolla St.

The 40th and 46th are partitioned by E La Palma Ave, E Jackson Ave, E Frontera St, Santa Ana River, Riverside Freeway, Costa Mesa Freeway, N Tustin St, E Meats Ave, N Orange Olive Rd, Garden Grove Freeway, 16909 Donwest-16791 E Main St, E Chestnut Ave, 16282 E Main St-717 S Lyon St, E McFadden Ave, and Warner Ave.

The 40th, 47th, and 49th are partitioned by Barranca Parkway, Jamboree Rd, Warner Ave, Harvard Ave, Myford Rd, Highway 5, Loma Ridge Nature Preserve, Bee Canyon Access Rd, Portola Parkway, Highway 133, Highway 241, Bake Parkway, San Diego Freeway, Ridge Route Dr, Moulton Parkway, Santa Maria Ave, Via Vista, Alta Vis, Santa Vittoria Dr, Avenida del Sol, Punta Alta, Galle Azul, Bahia Blanca W, Laguna Coast Wilderness Park, Highway S18, Aliso & Wood Canyons, Alicia Parkway, Pacific Park Dr, San Joaquin Hills Trans Corridor, Cabot Rd, San Diego Freeway, Via Escolar, Arroyo Trabuco Creek, Oso Parkway, Thomas F Riley Wilderness Park, and Ronald W Casper's Wilderness Park.

San Bernardino County is split between this district and the 35th district. They are partitioned by Chino Valley Freeway, Eucalyptus Ave, Peyton Dr, Highway 142, Tupelo Ave, Hazelwood Dr, Pipeline Ave, Los Serranos Blvd, Country Club Dr, Soquel Canyon Parkway, Elinvar Dr, Sapphire Rd, Onyx Rd, Copper Rd, Slate Dr, Butterfield Ranch Rd, and Pine Ave.

=== Cities and CDPs with 10,000 or more people ===
- Anaheim – 346,824
- Orange – 139,911
- Mission Viejo – 93,653
- Lake Forest – 85,858
- Tustin – 80,276
- Chino Hills – 78,411
- Yorba Linda – 68,336
- Aliso Viejo – 52,176
- Rancho Santa Margarita – 47,949
- Brea – 47,325
- Laguna Hills – 31,374
- North Tustin – 25,718
- Laguna Woods – 17,192
- Coto de Caza – 14,710

=== 2,500 – 10,000 people ===
- Villa Park – 5,843

== Future composition ==
Beginning with the 2026 election, the 40th district will consist of the following counties:

- Orange (part)
- Riverside (part)

== List of members representing the district ==
Member	Party	Dates	Cong ress(es)	Electoral history	Counties
District created January 3, 1973
Bob Wilson (San Diego)	Republican	January 3, 1973 – January 3, 1975	93rd	Redistricted from the 37th district and re-elected in 1972. Redistricted to the 41st district.	1973–1975; San Diego (San Diego City Northern half)
Andrew J. Hinshaw (Newport Beach)	Republican	January 3, 1975 – January 3, 1977	94th	Redistricted from the 39th district and re-elected in 1974. Lost renomination.	1975–1983; Southern Orange, Northwestern San Diego
Robert Badham (Newport Beach)	Republican	January 3, 1977 – January 3, 1989	95th 96th 97th 98th 99th 100th	Elected in 1976. Re-elected in 1978. Re-elected in 1980. Re-elected in 1982. Re-elected in 1984. Re-elected in 1986. Retired.	1975–1983; Southern Orange, Northwestern San Diego
Robert Badham (Newport Beach)	Republican	January 3, 1977 – January 3, 1989	95th 96th 97th 98th 99th 100th	Elected in 1976. Re-elected in 1978. Re-elected in 1980. Re-elected in 1982. Re-elected in 1984. Re-elected in 1986. Retired.	1983–1993; Central Orange
Christopher Cox (Newport Beach)	Republican	January 3, 1989 – January 3, 1993	101st 102nd	Elected in 1988. Re-elected in 1990. Redistricted to the 47th district.	1983–1993; Central Orange
Jerry Lewis (Redlands)	Republican	January 3, 1993 – January 3, 2003	103rd 104th 105th 106th 107th	Redistricted from the 35th district and re-elected in 1992. Re-elected in 1994. Re-elected in 1996. Re-elected in 1998. Re-elected in 2000. Redistricted to the 41st district.	1993–2003; Inyo, San Bernardino
Ed Royce (Fullerton)	Republican	January 3, 2003 – January 3, 2013	108th 109th 110th 111th 112th	Redistricted from the 39th district and re-elected in 2002. Re-elected in 2004. Re-elected in 2006. Re-elected in 2008. Re-elected in 2010. Redistricted to the 39th district.	2003–2013 Northern Orange
Lucille Roybal-Allard (Downey)	Democratic	January 3, 2013 – January 3, 2023	113th 114th 115th 116th 117th	Redistricted from the 34th district and re-elected in 2012. Re-elected in 2014. Re-elected in 2016. Re-elected in 2018. Re-elected in 2020. Redistricted to the 42nd district and retired.	2013–2023 Los Angeles (Downey and East Los Angeles)
Young Kim (Anaheim Hills)	Republican	January 3, 2023 – present	118th 119th	Redistricted from the 39th district and re-elected in 2022. Re-elected in 2024. Lost re-election.	2023–present: Parts of Orange, Riverside and San Bernardino counties (Yorba Linda, Anaheim Hills, Orange, Chino Hills, Tustin, Mission Viejo, Aliso Viejo, Rancho Santa Margarita, Laguna Hills, Laguna Woods, Villa Park, Lake Forest, the unincorporated communities of North Tustin and Coto de Caza, and parts of Brea and Corona.)
Ken Calvert (Corona)	Republican	Assuming office on January 3, 2027		Redistricted from the 41st district and re-elected in 2026.	2023–present: Parts of Orange, Riverside and San Bernardino counties (Yorba Linda, Anaheim Hills, Orange, Chino Hills, Tustin, Mission Viejo, Aliso Viejo, Rancho Santa Margarita, Laguna Hills, Laguna Woods, Villa Park, Lake Forest, the unincorporated communities of North Tustin and Coto de Caza, and parts of Brea and Corona.)

== Election results ==
=== 1972 ===
1972 United States House of Representatives elections in California
Party	Candidate	Votes	%
Republican	Bob Wilson (Incumbent)	153,648	67.8
Democratic	Frank Caprio	68,771	30.3
American Independent	Fritjof Thygeson	4,294	1.9
Total votes		226,713	100.0
Republican hold			

=== 1974 ===
1974 United States House of Representatives elections in California
Party	Candidate	Votes	%
Republican	Andrew J. Hinshaw (Incumbent)	114,895	63.4
Democratic	Roderick J. "Rod" Wilson	56,195	30.9
American Independent	Grayson L. Watkins	10,381	5.7
Total votes		181,471	100.0
Republican hold			

=== 1976 ===
1976 United States House of Representatives elections in California
Party	Candidate	Votes	%
Republican	Robert Badham	148,512	59.3
Democratic	Vivian Hall	102,132	40.7
Total votes		250,644	100.0
Republican hold			

=== 1978 ===
1978 United States House of Representatives elections in California
Party	Candidate	Votes	%
Republican	Robert Badham (Incumbent)	147,882	65.9
Democratic	Jim McGuy	76,358	34.1
Total votes		224,240	100.0
Republican hold			

=== 1980 ===
1980 United States House of Representatives elections in California
Party	Candidate	Votes	%
Republican	Robert Badham (Incumbent)	213,999	70.2
Democratic	Michael F. Dow	66,512	21.8
Libertarian	Dan Mahaffey	24,486	8.0
Total votes		304,997	100.0
Republican hold			

=== 1982 ===
1982 United States House of Representatives elections in California
Party	Candidate	Votes	%
Republican	Robert Badham (Incumbent)	144,228	71.5
Democratic	Paul Hasenman	52,546	26.1
Peace and Freedom	Maxine Bell Quirk	4,826	2.4
Total votes		201,600	100.0
Republican hold			

=== 1984 ===
1984 United States House of Representatives elections in California
Party	Candidate	Votes	%
Republican	Robert Badham (Incumbent)	164,257	64.4
Democratic	Carol Ann Bradford	86,748	34.0
Peace and Freedom	Maxine Bell Quirk	3,969	1.6
Total votes		254,974	100.0
Republican hold			

=== 1986 ===
1986 United States House of Representatives elections in California
Party	Candidate	Votes	%
Republican	Robert Badham (Incumbent)	119,829	59.8
Democratic	Bruce W. Sumner	75,664	37.7
Peace and Freedom	Steve Sears	5,025	2.5
Total votes		200,518	100.0
Republican hold			

=== 1988 ===
1988 United States House of Representatives elections in California
Party	Candidate	Votes	%
Republican	Chris Cox	181,269	67.1
Democratic	Lida Lenney	80,782	29.9
Libertarian	Roger Bloxham	4,539	1.7
Peace and Freedom	Gretchen J. Farsai	3,699	1.4
Independent	Write-ins	87	0.0
Total votes		270,376	100.0
Republican hold			

=== 1990 ===
1990 United States House of Representatives elections in California
Party	Candidate	Votes	%
Republican	Chris Cox (Incumbent)	142,299	67.6
Democratic	Eugene Gratz	68,087	32.4
Total votes		210,376	100.0
Republican hold			

=== 1992 ===
1992 United States House of Representatives elections in California
Party	Candidate	Votes	%
Republican	Jerry Lewis (Incumbent)	129,563	63.1
Democratic	Donald M. "Don" Rusk	63,881	31.1
Peace and Freedom	Margie Akin	11,839	5.8
Total votes		205,283	100.0
Republican hold			

=== 1994 ===
1994 United States House of Representatives elections in California
Party	Candidate	Votes	%
Republican	Jerry Lewis (Incumbent)	115,728	70.7
Democratic	Donald M. "Don" Rusk	48,003	29.3
Total votes		163,731	100.0
Republican hold			

=== 1996 ===
1996 United States House of Representatives elections in California
Party	Candidate	Votes	%
Republican	Jerry Lewis (Incumbent)	98,821	65.0
Democratic	Robert Conaway	44,102	29.0
American Independent	Hale McGee	4,963	3.2
Libertarian	Joseph Kelly	4,375	2.8
Total votes		132,261	100.0
Republican hold			

=== 1998 ===
1998 United States House of Representatives elections in California
Party	Candidate	Votes	%
Republican	Jerry Lewis (Incumbent)	97,406	64.9
Democratic	Robert "Bob" Conaway	47,897	31.9
Libertarian	Maurice Mayben	4,822	3.2
Total votes		150,125	100.0
Republican hold			

=== 2000 ===
2000 United States House of Representatives elections in California
Party	Candidate	Votes	%
Republican	Jerry Lewis (Incumbent)	151,069	80.0
Natural Law	Frank N. Schmidt	19,029	10.0
Libertarian	Jay Lindberg	18,924	10.0
Total votes		189,022	100.0
Republican hold			

=== 2002 ===
2002 United States House of Representatives elections in California
Party	Candidate	Votes	%
Republican	Ed Royce (Incumbent)	92,422	67.7
Democratic	Christina Avalos	40,265	29.5
Libertarian	Charles R. "Chuck" McGlawn	3,955	2.8
Total votes		136,642	100.0
Republican hold			

=== 2004 ===
2004 United States House of Representatives elections in California
Party	Candidate	Votes	%
Republican	Ed Royce (Incumbent)	189,336	68.0
Democratic	Tilman Williams	69,684	32.0
Total votes		259,020	100.0
Republican hold			

=== 2006 ===
2006 United States House of Representatives elections in California
Party	Candidate	Votes	%
Republican	Ed Royce (Incumbent)	100,995	66.8
Democratic	Florice Orea Hoffman	46,418	30.7
Libertarian	Philip H. Inman	3,876	2.5
Total votes		151,289	100.0
Republican hold			

=== 2008 ===
2008 United States House of Representatives elections in California
Party	Candidate	Votes	%
Republican	Ed Royce (Incumbent)	144,923	62.6
Democratic	Christina Avalos	86,772	37.4
Total votes		231,695	100.0
Republican hold			

=== 2010 ===
2010 United States House of Representatives elections in California
Party	Candidate	Votes	%
Republican	Ed Royce (Incumbent)	119,455	66.8
Democratic	Christina Avalos	59,400	33.2
Total votes		178,855	100.0
Republican hold			

=== 2012 ===
2012 United States House of Representatives elections in California
Party	Candidate	Votes	%
Democratic	Lucille Roybal-Allard (Incumbent)	73,940	58.9
Democratic	David Sanchez	51,613	41.1
Total votes		125,553	100.0
Democratic hold			

=== 2014 ===
2014 United States House of Representatives elections in California
Party	Candidate	Votes	%
Democratic	Lucille Roybal-Allard (Incumbent)	30,208	61.2
Democratic	David Sanchez	19,171	38.8
Total votes		49,379	100.0
Democratic hold			

=== 2016 ===
2016 United States House of Representatives elections in California
Party	Candidate	Votes	%
Democratic	Lucille Roybal-Allard (Incumbent)	106,554	81.2
Independent	Roman Gonzalez	24,743	18.8
Total votes		131,297	100.0
Democratic hold			

=== 2018 ===
2018 United States House of Representatives elections in California
Party	Candidate	Votes	%
Democratic	Lucille Roybal-Allard (Incumbent)	93,938	77.3
Green	Rodolfo Cortes Barragan	27,511	22.7
Total votes		121,449	100.0
Democratic hold			

=== 2020 ===
2020 United States House of Representatives elections in California
Party	Candidate	Votes	%
Democratic	Lucille Roybal-Allard (incumbent)	135,572	72.7
Republican	C. Antonio Delgado	50,809	27.3
Total votes		186,381	100.0
Democratic hold			

=== 2022 ===
2022 United States House of Representatives elections in California
Party	Candidate	Votes	%
Republican	Young Kim (incumbent)	161,589	56.8
Democratic	Asif Mahmood	122,722	43.2
Total votes		284,311	100.0
Republican hold			

=== 2024 ===
2024 United States House of Representatives elections in California
Party	Candidate	Votes	%
Republican	Young Kim (incumbent)	211,998	55.3
Democratic	Joe Kerr	171,637	44.7
Total votes		383,635	100.0
Republican hold			

== Historical district boundaries ==
The seat was originally one of five reapportioned to California after the 1970 U.S. census, but its boundaries have shifted radically through successive redistricting efforts. At various times it has included parts of Orange and San Diego counties, and from 1993 to 2003 it covered eastern San Bernardino and Inyo counties. From 2003 to 2013 the district was based in Orange County. The district covered the cities in the northern part of the county, including Fullerton, Orange, Cypress, Stanton, and Buena Park.

== See also ==
- List of United States congressional districts
- California's congressional districts
