= 103rd United States Congress =

1993–1995 U.S. legislative term

←	102nd	104th	→
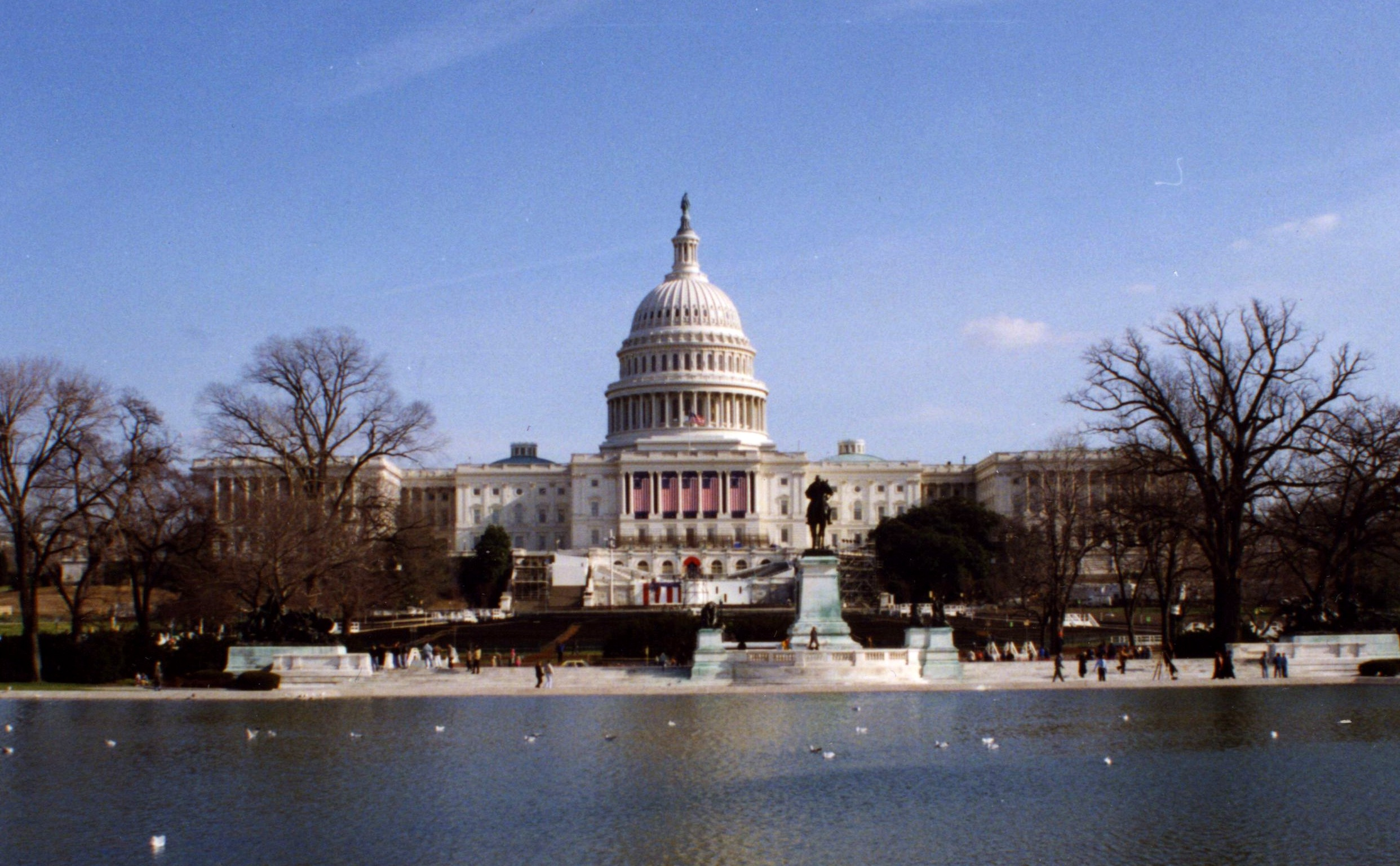
- United States Capitol (1993)

Overview
- Legislative body: United States Congress
- Jurisdiction: United States
- Term: January 3, 1993 – January 3, 1995

Senate
- Members: 100
- President: Dan Quayle (R) (Note: U.S. Vice President Dan Quayle's term as President of the Senate ended at noon on January 20, 1993, when Al Gore's term began.) (until January 20, 1993); Al Gore (D) (from January 20, 1993)
- President pro tempore: Robert Byrd (D)
- Party control: Democratic

House of Representatives
- Members: 435 representatives 5 non-voting delegates
- Speaker: Tom Foley (D)
- Party control: Democratic

Sessions
- 1st: January 5, 1993 – November 26, 1993
- 2nd: January 25, 1994 – December 1, 1994

The 103rd United States Congress was a meeting of the legislative branch of the United States federal government, composed of the United States Senate and the United States House of Representatives. It met in Washington, D.C. from January 3, 1993, to January 3, 1995, during the final weeks of George H. W. Bush's presidency and in the first two years of Bill Clinton's presidency. The apportionment of seats in the House of Representatives was based on the 1990 United States census.

This is the most recent Congress to have a Democratic senator from Texas, Bob Krueger, who lost election to finish Lloyd Bentsen's term in 1993. Along with two Democratic senators from the state of Tennessee, Jim Sasser and Harlan Mathews. Jim Sasser lost re-election and Harlan Mathews retired in 1994. In addition, a Democratic senator from the state of Oklahoma, David Boren, resigned in the final weeks of the Congress.

Both chambers maintained a Democratic majority, and with Bill Clinton being sworn in as president on January 20, 1993, this gave the Democrats an overall federal government trifecta for the first time since the 96th Congress in 1979.

== Major events ==
- January 20, 1993: Bill Clinton became the 42nd president of the United States.
- February 17, 1993: President Clinton addressed a joint session of Congress
- February 26, 1993: World Trade Center bombing: In New York City, a van bomb parked below the North Tower of the World Trade Center exploded, killing 6 and injuring over 1,000.
- February 28, 1993: Waco siege: Bureau of Alcohol, Tobacco and Firearms agents raided the Branch Davidian compound in Waco, Texas, with a warrant to arrest leader David Koresh on federal firearms violations. Four agents and 5 Davidians died in the raid.
- April 19, 1993: Waco siege: The 51-day standoff ended with a fire that killed 76 people, including Koresh.
- September 22, 1993: President Clinton addressed a joint session of Congress to promote health care reform.
- October 3, 1993: Operation Gothic Serpent: In Mogadishu, Somalia, two U.S. Army UH-60 Blackhawks were shot down and the operation left over 1000 Somalis dead and over 73 Americans WIA, 19 KIA, and 1 captured.
- January 17, 1994: 1994 Northridge earthquake: A magnitude 6.7 quake hit the San Fernando Valley of Los Angeles at 4:31 a.m., killing 72 and leaving 26,029 homeless.
- February 22, 1994: Aldrich Ames and his wife were arrested for spying for the Soviet Union.
- February 28, 1994: 4 United States fighter jets shot down 4 Serbian jets over Bosnia and Herzegovina for violating Operation Deny Flight and its no-fly zone.
- September 19, 1994: Operation Uphold Democracy: American troops staged a bloodless invasion of Haiti to restore the elected president to power.
- October 1, 1994: Palau achieved independence and became an associated state under the Compact of Free Association.
- November 8, 1994: Republican Revolution: The Republican Party won control of both the House and the Senate in midterm congressional elections, the first time in 40 years the Republicans secured control of both houses of Congress.

== Major legislation ==
- February 5, 1993: Family and Medical Leave Act of 1993, Pub. L. 103–3, 107 Stat. 6
- May 20, 1993: National Voter Registration Act of 1993, Pub. L. 103–31, 107 Stat. 77
- August 3, 1993: Government Performance and Results Act, Pub. L. 103–62, 107 Stat. 296
- August 10, 1993: Omnibus Budget Reconciliation Act of 1993, Pub. L. 103–66, 107 Stat. 312
- September 21, 1993: National and Community Service Trust Act of 1993, Pub. L. 103–82,
- November 16, 1993: Religious Freedom Restoration Act, Pub. L. 103–141, 107 Stat. 1488
- November 30, 1993: Brady Handgun Violence Prevention Act (Brady Bill), Pub. L. 103–159, title I, 107 Stat. 1536
- November 30, 1993: Don't ask, don't tell (as § 574 of the National Defense Authorization Act for Fiscal Year 1994), Pub. L. 103–160, 107 Stat. 1670
- December 8, 1993: North American Free Trade Agreement Implementation Act, Pub. L. 103–182, 107 Stat. 2057
- December 17, 1993: FRIENDSHIP Act of 1993, Pub. L. 103–199, 107 Stat. 2317
- May 26, 1994: Freedom of Access to Clinic Entrances Act, Pub. L. 103–259, 108 Stat. 694
- September 13, 1994: Violent Crime Control and Law Enforcement Act (including the Violence Against Women Act and the Federal Assault Weapons Ban), Pub. L. 103–322, 108 Stat. 1796
- September 29, 1994: Riegle–Neal Interstate Banking and Branching Efficiency Act of 1994
- October 20, 1994: Improving America's Schools Act of 1994, Pub. L. 103–382
- October 25, 1994 Communications Assistance for Law Enforcement Act October 25 Immigration and Nationality Technical Corrections Act of 1994 (INTCA or H. R. 783), Pub. L. 10
- October 31, 1994 California Desert Protection Act of 1994, Pub. L. 103–433
- November 2, 1994 Healthy Meals for Healthy Americans Act of 1994

== Party summary ==
=== Senate ===
Senate party standings on the opening day of Congress 57 Democratic senators 43 Republican senators

	Party (shading shows control)		Total	Vacant
	Democratic (D)	Republican (R)	Total	Vacant
End of previous congress	58	42	100	0
Begin	57	43	100	0
End	53	47	100	0
Final voting share	53.0%	47.0%		
Beginning of next congress	47	53	100	0

=== House of Representatives ===
	Party (Shading indicates majority caucus)			Total	
	Democratic	Independent	Republican	Total	Vacant
End of the previous Congress	267	1	166	434	1
Begin	258	1	176	435	0
End	256	1	177	434	1
Final voting share	59.2%		40.8%		
Non-voting members	4	0	0	5	0
Beginning of the next Congress	204	1	230	435	0

== Leadership ==
=== Senate ===
Senate President

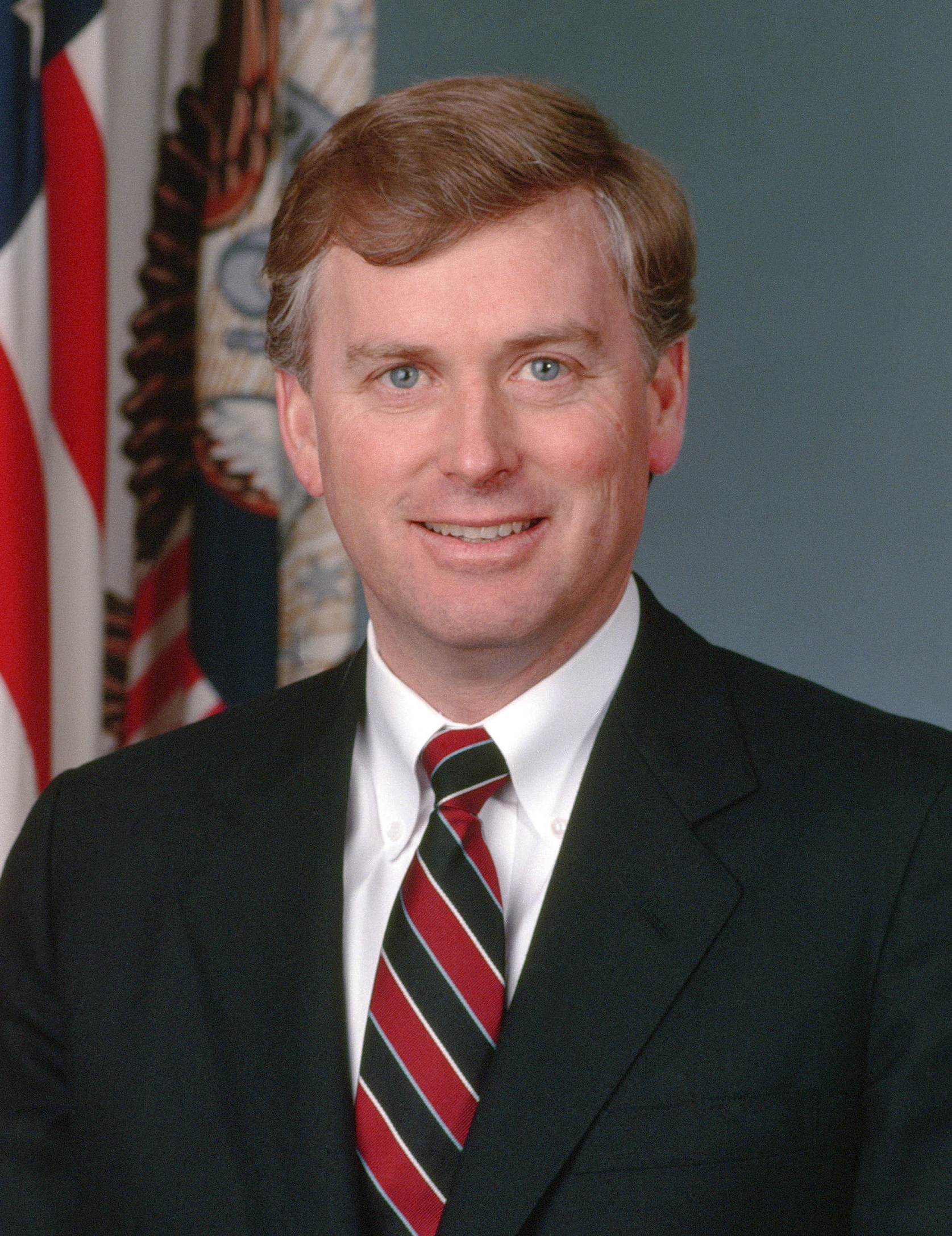
Dan Quayle (R)
(until January 20, 1993)

Al Gore (D)
(from January 20, 1993)

Senate President pro tempore

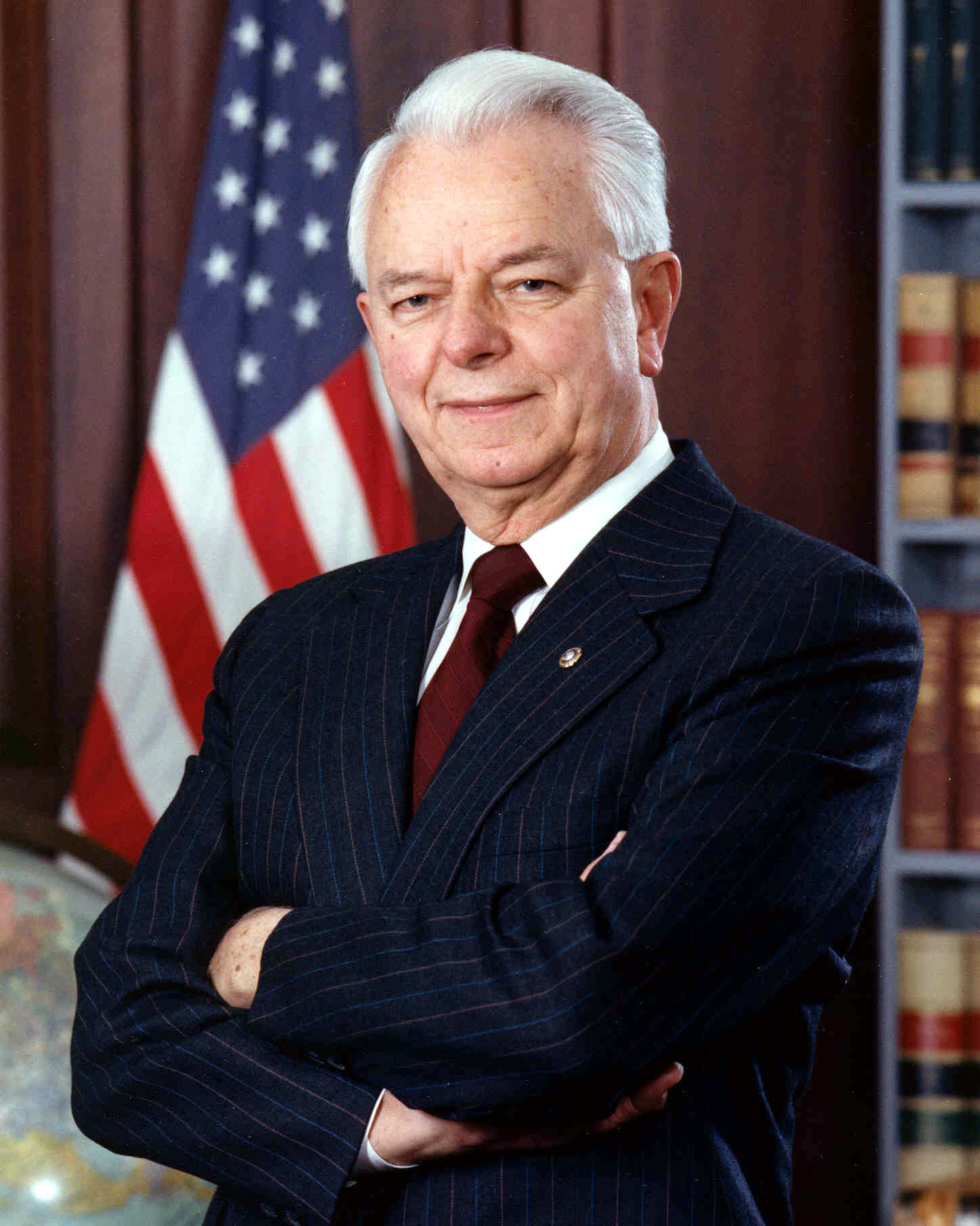
Robert Byrd (D)

- President: Dan Quayle (R), until January 20, 1993
  - Al Gore (D), from January 20, 1993
- President pro tempore: Robert Byrd (D)

==== Majority (Democratic) leadership ====
- Majority Leader and Policy Committee Chairman: George Mitchell
- Majority Whip: Wendell Ford
- Senatorial Campaign Committee Chair: Bob Graham
- Democratic Caucus Secretary: David Pryor
- Policy Committee Co-Chair: Harry Reid
- Chief Deputy Whip: John Breaux

==== Minority (Republican) leadership ====
- Minority Leader: Bob Dole
- Minority Whip: Alan Simpson
- Republican Conference Chairman: Thad Cochran
- Policy Committee Chairman: Don Nickles
- Republican Conference Vice-Chairman: Trent Lott
- National Senatorial Committee Chair: Phil Gramm

=== House of Representatives ===
Speaker of the House

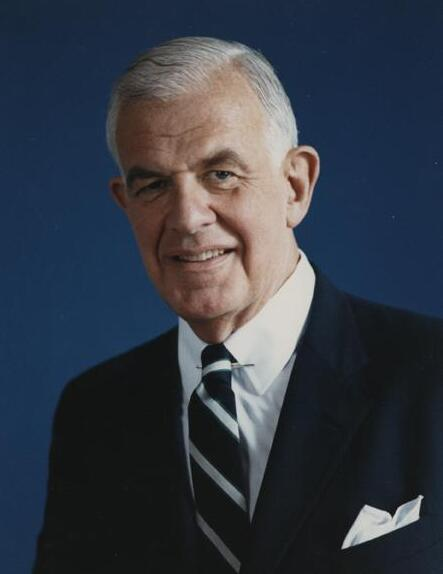
Tom Foley (D)

- Speaker: Tom Foley (D)

==== Majority (Democratic) leadership ====
- Majority Leader: Dick Gephardt
- Majority Whip: David Bonior
- Democratic Caucus Chairman: Steny Hoyer
- Democratic Caucus Vice-Chairman: Vic Fazio
- Deputy Majority Whips: Barbara Kennelly, Butler Derrick, John Lewis, & Bill Richardson

==== Minority (Republican) leadership ====
- Minority Leader: Bob Michel
- Minority Whip: Newt Gingrich
- Chief Deputy Whip: Bob Walker
- Republican Conference Chairman: Dick Armey
- Republican Conference Vice-Chairman: Bill McCollum
- Republican Conference Secretary: Tom DeLay
- Policy Committee Chairman: Henry Hyde
- Republican Campaign Committee Chairman: Bill Paxon

== Members ==
This list is arranged by chamber, then by state. Senators are listed by class, and representatives are listed by district.

=== Senate ===
Senators are popularly elected statewide every two years, with one-third beginning new six-year terms with each Congress, In this Congress, Class 1 meant their term ended with this Congress, requiring reelection in 1994; Class 2 meant their term began in the last Congress, requiring reelection in 1996; and Class 3 meant their term began in this Congress, requiring reelection in 1998.

==== Alabama ====
▌2. Howell Heflin (D)
▌▌3. Richard Shelby (D, then R from November 9, 1994)

==== Alaska ====
▌2. Ted Stevens (R)
▌3. Frank Murkowski (R)

==== Arizona ====
▌1. Dennis DeConcini (D)
▌3. John McCain (R)

==== Arkansas ====
▌2. David Pryor (D)
▌3. Dale Bumpers (D)

==== California ====
▌1. Dianne Feinstein (D)
▌3. Barbara Boxer (D)

==== Colorado ====
▌2. Hank Brown (R)
▌3. Ben Nighthorse Campbell (D)

==== Connecticut ====
▌1. Joe Lieberman (D)
▌3. Chris Dodd (D)

==== Delaware ====
▌1. William Roth (R)
▌2. Joe Biden (D)

==== Florida ====
▌1. Connie Mack III (R)
▌3. Bob Graham (D)

==== Georgia ====
▌2. Sam Nunn (D)
▌3. Paul Coverdell (R)

==== Hawaii ====
▌1. Daniel Akaka (D)
▌3. Daniel Inouye (D)

==== Idaho ====
▌2. Larry Craig (R)
▌3. Dirk Kempthorne (R)

==== Illinois ====
▌2. Paul Simon (D)
▌3. Carol Moseley Braun (D)

==== Indiana ====
▌1. Richard Lugar (R)
▌3. Dan Coats (R)

==== Iowa ====
▌2. Tom Harkin (D)
▌3. Chuck Grassley (R)

==== Kansas ====
▌2. Nancy Kassebaum (R)
▌3. Bob Dole (R)

==== Kentucky ====
▌2. Mitch McConnell (R)
▌3. Wendell Ford (D)

==== Louisiana ====
▌2. J. Bennett Johnston (D)
▌3. John Breaux (D)

==== Maine ====
▌1. George J. Mitchell (D)
▌2. William Cohen (R)

==== Maryland ====
▌1. Paul Sarbanes (D)
▌3. Barbara Mikulski (D)

==== Massachusetts ====
▌1. Ted Kennedy (D)
▌2. John Kerry (D)

==== Michigan ====
▌1. Donald Riegle (D)
▌2. Carl Levin (D)

==== Minnesota ====
▌1. David Durenberger (I-R)/(R) (Note: The Independent-Republicans of Minnesota reverted its name back to the Republican Party of Minnesota on September 23, 1995. As such, Independent-Republicans from Minnesota before that date are still counted as Republicans.)
▌2. Paul Wellstone (DFL) (Note: The Minnesota Democratic–Farmer–Labor Party (DFL) and the North Dakota Democratic-Nonpartisan League Party (D-NPL) are the Minnesota and North Dakota affiliates of the U.S. Democratic Party and are counted as Democrats.)

==== Mississippi ====
▌1. Trent Lott (R)
▌2. Thad Cochran (R)

==== Missouri ====
▌1. John Danforth (R)
▌3. Kit Bond (R)

==== Montana ====
▌1. Conrad Burns (R)
▌2. Max Baucus (D)

==== Nebraska ====
▌1. Bob Kerrey (D)
▌2. J. James Exon (D)

==== Nevada ====
▌1. Richard Bryan (D)
▌3. Harry Reid (D)

==== New Hampshire ====
▌2. Bob Smith (R)
▌3. Judd Gregg (R)

==== New Jersey ====
▌1. Frank Lautenberg (D)
▌2. Bill Bradley (D)

==== New Mexico ====
▌1. Jeff Bingaman (D)
▌2. Pete Domenici (R)

==== New York ====
▌1. Daniel Patrick Moynihan (D)
▌3. Al D'Amato (R)

==== North Carolina ====
▌2. Jesse Helms (R)
▌3. Lauch Faircloth (R)

==== North Dakota ====
▌1. Kent Conrad (D-NPL)
▌3. Byron Dorgan (D-NPL)

==== Ohio ====
▌1. Howard Metzenbaum (D)
▌3. John Glenn (D)

==== Oklahoma ====
▌2. David Boren (D), until November 15, 1994

▌Jim Inhofe (R), from November 17, 1994

▌3. Don Nickles (R)

==== Oregon ====
▌2. Mark Hatfield (R)
▌3. Bob Packwood (R)

==== Pennsylvania ====
▌1. Harris Wofford (D)
▌3. Arlen Specter (R)

==== Rhode Island ====
▌1. John Chafee (R)
▌2. Claiborne Pell (D)

==== South Carolina ====
▌2. Strom Thurmond (R)
▌3. Fritz Hollings (D)

==== South Dakota ====
▌2. Larry Pressler (R)
▌3. Tom Daschle (D)

==== Tennessee ====
▌1. Jim Sasser (D)
▌2. Harlan Mathews (D), until December 1, 1994

▌Fred Thompson (R), from December 2, 1994

==== Texas ====
▌1. Lloyd Bentsen (D), until January 20, 1993

▌Bob Krueger (D), January 21, 1993 – June 14, 1993
▌Kay Bailey Hutchison (R), from June 14, 1993

▌2. Phil Gramm (R)

==== Utah ====
▌1. Orrin Hatch (R)
▌3. Bob Bennett (R)

==== Vermont ====
▌1. Jim Jeffords (R)
▌3. Patrick Leahy (D)

==== Virginia ====
▌1. Chuck Robb (D)
▌2. John Warner (R)

==== Washington ====
▌1. Slade Gorton (R)
▌3. Patty Murray (D)

==== West Virginia ====
▌1. Robert Byrd (D)
▌2. Jay Rockefeller (D)

==== Wisconsin ====
▌1. Herb Kohl (D)
▌3. Russ Feingold (D)

==== Wyoming ====
▌1. Malcolm Wallop (R)
▌2. Alan Simpson (R)

Senators' party membership by state at the opening of the 103rd Congress in January 1993 2 Democrats 1 Democrat and 1 Republican 2 Republicans

Senate majority leadership

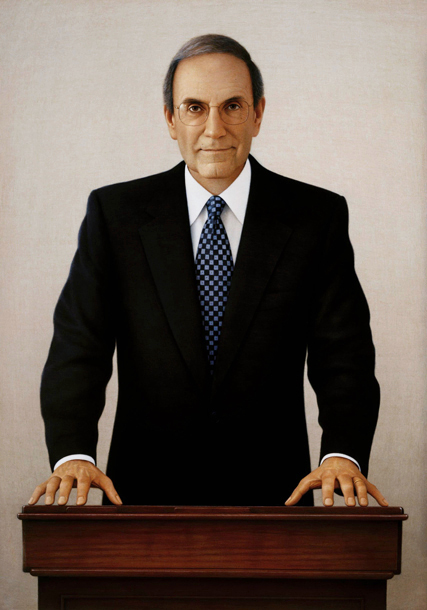
Democratic leader
George J. Mitchell

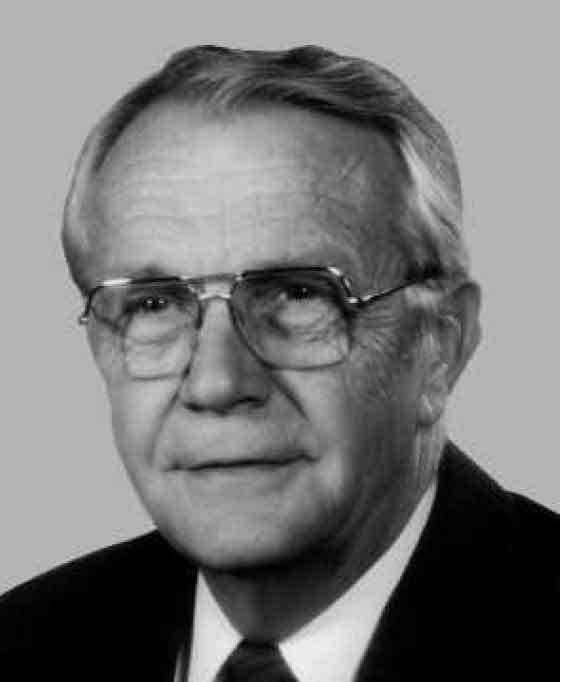
Democratic whip
Wendell Ford

Senate minority leadership

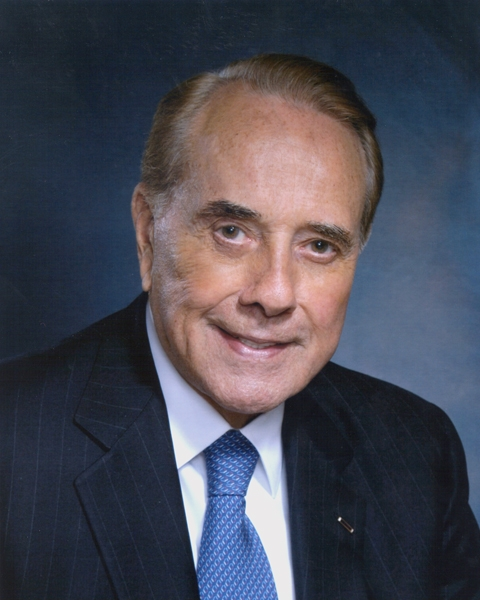
Republican leader
Bob Dole

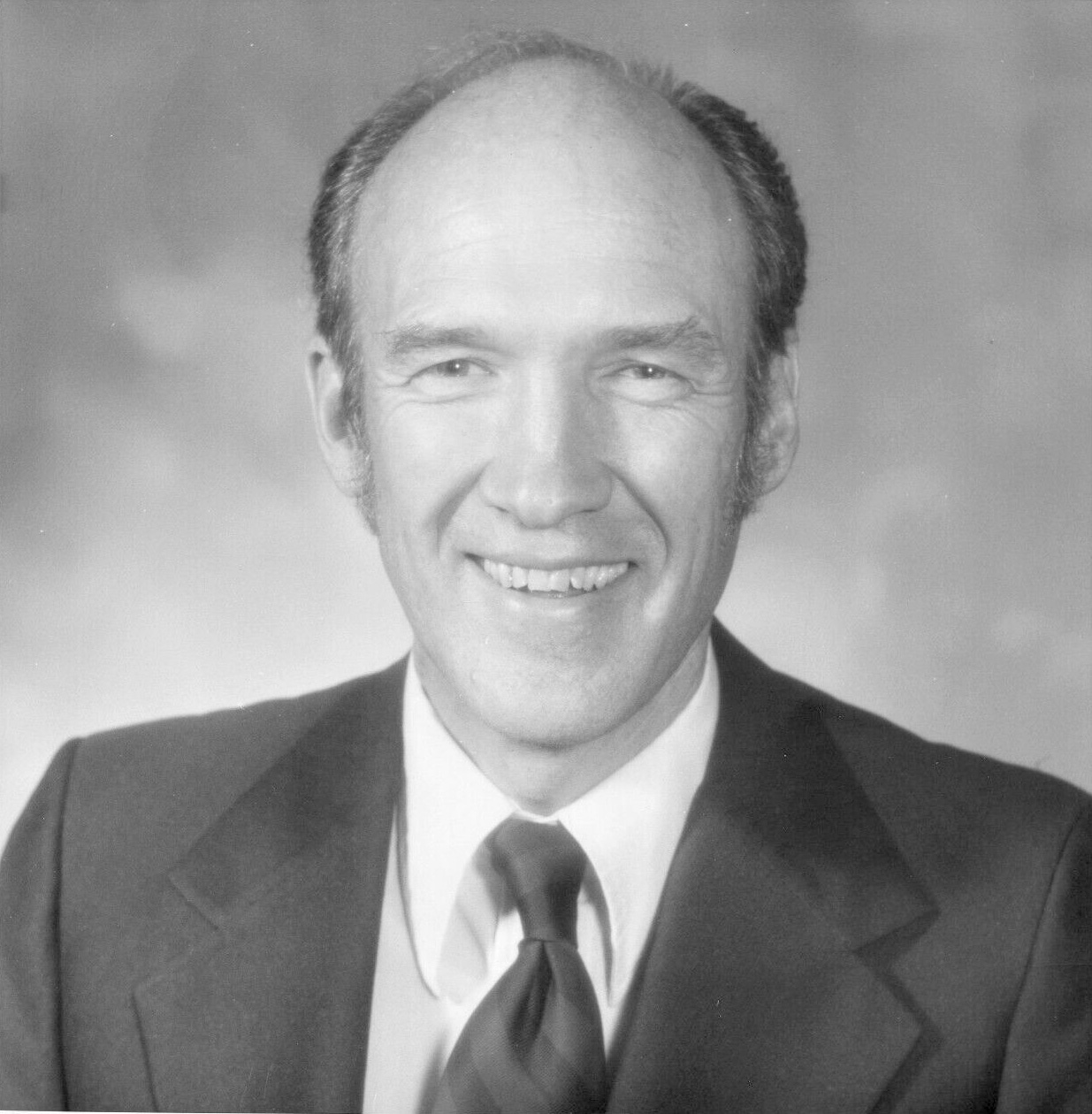
Republican whip
Alan K. Simpson

=== House of Representatives ===
==== Alabama ====
▌1. Sonny Callahan (R)
▌2. Terry Everett (R)
▌3. Glen Browder (D)
▌4. Tom Bevill (D)
▌5. Robert E. Cramer (D)
▌6. Spencer Bachus (R)
▌7. Earl Hilliard (D)

==== Alaska ====
▌At-large. Don Young (R)

==== Arizona ====
▌1. Sam Coppersmith (D)
▌2. Ed Pastor (D)
▌3. Bob Stump (R)
▌4. Jon Kyl (R)
▌5. Jim Kolbe (R)
▌6. Karan English (D)

==== Arkansas ====
▌1. Blanche Lincoln (D)
▌2. Ray Thornton (D)
▌3. Tim Hutchinson (R)
▌4. Jay Dickey (R)

==== California ====
▌1. Dan Hamburg (D)
▌2. Wally Herger (R)
▌3. Vic Fazio (D)
▌4. John Doolittle (R)
▌5. Bob Matsui (D)
▌6. Lynn Woolsey (D)
▌7. George Miller (D)
▌8. Nancy Pelosi (D)
▌9. Ron Dellums (D)
▌10. William P. Baker (R)
▌11. Richard Pombo (R)
▌12. Tom Lantos (D)
▌13. Pete Stark (D)
▌14. Anna Eshoo (D)
▌15. Norman Mineta (D)
▌16. Don Edwards (D)
▌17. Leon Panetta (D), until January 22, 1993

▌Sam Farr (D), from June 8, 1993

▌18. Gary Condit (D)
▌19. Richard H. Lehman (D)
▌20. Cal Dooley (D)
▌21. Bill Thomas (R)
▌22. Michael Huffington (R)
▌23. Elton Gallegly (R)
▌24. Anthony Beilenson (D)
▌25. Buck McKeon (R)
▌26. Howard Berman (D)
▌27. Carlos Moorhead (R)
▌28. David Dreier (R)
▌29. Henry Waxman (D)
▌30. Xavier Becerra (D)
▌31. Matthew G. Martínez (D)
▌32. Julian Dixon (D)
▌33. Lucille Roybal-Allard (D)
▌34. Esteban Edward Torres (D)
▌35. Maxine Waters (D)
▌36. Jane Harman (D)
▌37. Walter R. Tucker III (D)
▌38. Stephen Horn (R)
▌39. Ed Royce (R)
▌40. Jerry Lewis (R)
▌41. Jay Kim (R)
▌42. George Brown Jr. (D)
▌43. Ken Calvert (R)
▌44. Al McCandless (R)
▌45. Dana Rohrabacher (R)
▌46. Bob Dornan (R)
▌47. Christopher Cox (R)
▌48. Ron Packard (R)
▌49. Lynn Schenk (D)
▌50. Bob Filner (D)
▌51. Duke Cunningham (R)
▌52. Duncan L. Hunter (R)

==== Colorado ====
▌1. Pat Schroeder (D)
▌2. David Skaggs (D)
▌3. Scott McInnis (R)
▌4. Wayne Allard (R)
▌5. Joel Hefley (R)
▌6. Dan Schaefer (R)

==== Connecticut ====
▌1. Barbara B. Kennelly (D)
▌2. Sam Gejdenson (D)
▌3. Rosa DeLauro (D)
▌4. Chris Shays (R)
▌5. Gary A. Franks (R)
▌6. Nancy Johnson (R)

==== Delaware ====
▌At-large. Mike Castle (R)

==== Florida ====
▌1. Earl Hutto (D)
▌2. Pete Peterson (D)
▌3. Corrine Brown (D)
▌4. Tillie Fowler (R)
▌5. Karen Thurman (D)
▌6. Cliff Stearns (R)
▌7. John Mica (R)
▌8. Bill McCollum (R)
▌9. Michael Bilirakis (R)
▌10. Bill Young (R)
▌11. Sam M. Gibbons (D)
▌12. Charles T. Canady (R)
▌13. Dan Miller (R)
▌14. Porter Goss (R)
▌15. Jim Bacchus (D)
▌16. Tom Lewis (R)
▌17. Carrie Meek (D)
▌18. Ileana Ros-Lehtinen (R)
▌19. Harry Johnston (D)
▌20. Peter Deutsch (D)
▌21. Lincoln Diaz-Balart (R)
▌22. Clay Shaw (R)
▌23. Alcee Hastings (D)

==== Georgia ====
▌1. Jack Kingston (R)
▌2. Sanford Bishop (D)
▌3. Mac Collins (R)
▌4. John Linder (R)
▌5. John Lewis (D)
▌6. Newt Gingrich (R)
▌7. George Darden (D)
▌8. J. Roy Rowland (D)
▌9. Nathan Deal (D)
▌10. Don Johnson Jr. (D)
▌11. Cynthia McKinney (D)

==== Hawaii ====
▌1. Neil Abercrombie (D)
▌2. Patsy Mink (D)

==== Idaho ====
▌1. Larry LaRocco (D)
▌2. Mike Crapo (R)

==== Illinois ====
▌1. Bobby Rush (D)
▌2. Mel Reynolds (D)
▌3. Bill Lipinski (D)
▌4. Luis Gutiérrez (D)
▌5. Dan Rostenkowski (D)
▌6. Henry Hyde (R)
▌7. Cardiss Collins (D)
▌8. Phil Crane (R)
▌9. Sidney R. Yates (D)
▌10. John Porter (R)
▌11. George E. Sangmeister (D)
▌12. Jerry Costello (D)
▌13. Harris W. Fawell (R)
▌14. Dennis Hastert (R)
▌15. Thomas W. Ewing (R)
▌16. Don Manzullo (R)
▌17. Lane Evans (D)
▌18. Robert Michel (R)
▌19. Glenn Poshard (D)
▌20. Dick Durbin (D)

==== Indiana ====
▌1. Pete Visclosky (D)
▌2. Philip Sharp (D)
▌3. Tim Roemer (D)
▌4. Jill L. Long (D)
▌5. Steve Buyer (R)
▌6. Dan Burton (R)
▌7. John T. Myers (R)
▌8. Frank McCloskey (D)
▌9. Lee H. Hamilton (D)
▌10. Andrew Jacobs Jr. (D)

==== Iowa ====
▌1. Jim Leach (R)
▌2. Jim Nussle (R)
▌3. Jim Ross Lightfoot (R)
▌4. Neal Edward Smith (D)
▌5. Fred Grandy (R)

==== Kansas ====
▌1. Pat Roberts (R)
▌2. Jim Slattery (D)
▌3. Jan Meyers (R)
▌4. Dan Glickman (D)

==== Kentucky ====
▌1. Tom Barlow (D)
▌2. William Natcher (D), until March 29, 1994

▌Ron Lewis (R), from May 24, 1994

▌3. Romano Mazzoli (D)
▌4. Jim Bunning (R)
▌5. Hal Rogers (R)
▌6. Scotty Baesler (D)

==== Louisiana ====
▌1. Bob Livingston (R)
▌2. William J. Jefferson (D)
▌3. Billy Tauzin (D)
▌4. Cleo Fields (D)
▌5. Jim McCrery (R)
▌6. Richard H. Baker (R)
▌7. Jimmy Hayes (D)

==== Maine ====
▌1. Thomas Andrews (D)
▌2. Olympia Snowe (R)

==== Maryland ====
▌1. Wayne Gilchrest (R)
▌2. Helen Delich Bentley (R)
▌3. Ben Cardin (D)
▌4. Albert Wynn (D)
▌5. Steny Hoyer (D)
▌6. Roscoe Bartlett (R)
▌7. Kweisi Mfume (D)
▌8. Connie Morella (R)

==== Massachusetts ====
▌1. John Olver (D)
▌2. Richard Neal (D)
▌3. Peter I. Blute (R)
▌4. Barney Frank (D)
▌5. Marty Meehan (D)
▌6. Peter G. Torkildsen (R)
▌7. Ed Markey (D)
▌8. Joseph P. Kennedy II (D)
▌9. Joe Moakley (D)
▌10. Gerry Studds (D)

==== Michigan ====
▌1. Bart Stupak (D)
▌2. Pete Hoekstra (R)
▌3. Paul B. Henry (R), until July 31, 1993

▌Vern Ehlers (R), from December 7, 1993

▌4. Dave Camp (R)
▌5. James A. Barcia (D)
▌6. Fred Upton (R)
▌7. Nick Smith (R)
▌8. Milton Robert Carr (D)
▌9. Dale Kildee (D)
▌10. David Bonior (D)
▌11. Joe Knollenberg (R)
▌12. Sander Levin (D)
▌13. William D. Ford (D)
▌14. John Conyers (D)
▌15. Barbara-Rose Collins (D)
▌16. John Dingell (D)

==== Minnesota ====
▌1. Tim Penny (DFL)
▌2. David Minge (DFL)
▌3. Jim Ramstad (I-R)/(R)
▌4. Bruce Vento (DFL)
▌5. Martin Olav Sabo (DFL)
▌6. Rod Grams (I-R)/(R)
▌7. Collin Peterson (DFL)
▌8. Jim Oberstar (DFL)

==== Mississippi ====
▌1. Jamie Whitten (D)
▌2. Mike Espy (D), until January 22, 1993

▌Bennie Thompson (D), from April 13, 1993

▌3. Sonny Montgomery (D)
▌4. Michael Parker (D)
▌5. Gene Taylor (D)

==== Missouri ====
▌1. Bill Clay (D)
▌2. Jim Talent (R)
▌3. Dick Gephardt (D)
▌4. Ike Skelton (D)
▌5. Alan Wheat (D)
▌6. Pat Danner (D)
▌7. Mel Hancock (R)
▌8. Bill Emerson (R)
▌9. Harold Volkmer (D)

==== Montana ====
▌At-large. Pat Williams (D)

==== Nebraska ====
▌1. Doug Bereuter (R)
▌2. Peter Hoagland (D)
▌3. Bill Barrett (R)

==== Nevada ====
▌1. James Bilbray (D)
▌2. Barbara Vucanovich (R)

==== New Hampshire ====
▌1. Bill Zeliff (R)
▌2. Dick Swett (D)

==== New Jersey ====
▌1. Rob Andrews (D)
▌2. William J. Hughes (D)
▌3. Jim Saxton (R)
▌4. Chris Smith (R)
▌5. Marge Roukema (R)
▌6. Frank Pallone (D)
▌7. Bob Franks (R)
▌8. Herb Klein (D)
▌9. Robert Torricelli (D)
▌10. Donald M. Payne (D)
▌11. Dean Gallo (R), until November 6, 1994, vacant to end
▌12. Dick Zimmer (R)
▌13. Bob Menendez (D)

==== New Mexico ====
▌1. Steven Schiff (R)
▌2. Joe Skeen (R)
▌3. Bill Richardson (D)

==== New York ====
▌1. George J. Hochbrueckner (D)
▌2. Rick Lazio (R)
▌3. Peter T. King (R)
▌4. David A. Levy (R)
▌5. Gary Ackerman (D)
▌6. Floyd Flake (D)
▌7. Thomas J. Manton (D)
▌8. Jerry Nadler (D)
▌9. Chuck Schumer (D)
▌10. Edolphus Towns (D)
▌11. Major Owens (D)
▌12. Nydia Velázquez (D)
▌13. Susan Molinari (R)
▌14. Carolyn Maloney (D)
▌15. Charles Rangel (D)
▌16. José E. Serrano (D)
▌17. Eliot Engel (D)
▌18. Nita Lowey (D)
▌19. Hamilton Fish IV (R)
▌20. Benjamin Gilman (R)
▌21. Michael R. McNulty (D)
▌22. Gerald Solomon (R)
▌23. Sherwood Boehlert (R)
▌24. John M. McHugh (R)
▌25. James T. Walsh (R)
▌26. Maurice Hinchey (D)
▌27. Bill Paxon (R)
▌28. Louise Slaughter (D)
▌29. John J. LaFalce (D)
▌30. Jack Quinn (R)
▌31. Amo Houghton (R)

==== North Carolina ====
▌1. Eva Clayton (D)
▌2. Tim Valentine (D)
▌3. Martin Lancaster (D)
▌4. David Price (D)
▌5. Stephen L. Neal (D)
▌6. Howard Coble (R)
▌7. Charlie Rose (D)
▌8. Bill Hefner (D)
▌9. Alex McMillan (R)
▌10. Cass Ballenger (R)
▌11. Charles H. Taylor (R)
▌12. Mel Watt (D)

==== North Dakota ====
▌At-large. Earl Pomeroy (D-NPL)

==== Ohio ====
▌1. David S. Mann (D)
▌2. Bill Gradison (R), until January 31, 1993

▌Rob Portman (R), from May 4, 1993

▌3. Tony P. Hall (D)
▌4. Mike Oxley (R)
▌5. Paul Gillmor (R)
▌6. Ted Strickland (D)
▌7. Dave Hobson (R)
▌8. John Boehner (R)
▌9. Marcy Kaptur (D)
▌10. Martin Hoke (R)
▌11. Louis Stokes (D)
▌12. John Kasich (R)
▌13. Sherrod Brown (D)
▌14. Thomas C. Sawyer (D)
▌15. Deborah Pryce (R)
▌16. Ralph Regula (R)
▌17. Jim Traficant (D)
▌18. Douglas Applegate (D)
▌19. Eric Fingerhut (D)

==== Oklahoma ====
▌1. Jim Inhofe (R), until November 15, 1994

▌Steve Largent (R), from November 29, 1994

▌2. Mike Synar (D)
▌3. William K. Brewster (D)
▌4. Dave McCurdy (D)
▌5. Ernest Istook (R)
▌6. Glenn English (D), until January 7, 1994

▌Frank Lucas (R), from May 10, 1994

==== Oregon ====
▌1. Elizabeth Furse (D)
▌2. Robert Freeman Smith (R)
▌3. Ron Wyden (D)
▌4. Peter DeFazio (D)
▌5. Michael J. Kopetski (D)

==== Pennsylvania ====
▌1. Thomas M. Foglietta (D)
▌2. Lucien Blackwell (D)
▌3. Robert A. Borski Jr. (D)
▌4. Ron Klink (D)
▌5. William F. Clinger Jr. (R)
▌6. Tim Holden (D)
▌7. Curt Weldon (R)
▌8. James C. Greenwood (R)
▌9. Bud Shuster (R)
▌10. Joseph M. McDade (R)
▌11. Paul Kanjorski (D)
▌12. John Murtha (D)
▌13. Marjorie Margolies-Mezvinsky (D)
▌14. William J. Coyne (D)
▌15. Paul McHale (D)
▌16. Robert Smith Walker (R)
▌17. George Gekas (R)
▌18. Rick Santorum (R)
▌19. William F. Goodling (R)
▌20. Austin Murphy (D)
▌21. Tom Ridge (R)

==== Rhode Island ====
▌1. Ronald Machtley (R)
▌2. Jack Reed (D)

==== South Carolina ====
▌1. Arthur Ravenel Jr. (R)
▌2. Floyd Spence (R)
▌3. Butler Derrick (D)
▌4. Bob Inglis (R)
▌5. John Spratt (D)
▌6. Jim Clyburn (D)

==== South Dakota ====
▌At-large. Tim Johnson (D)

==== Tennessee ====
▌1. Jimmy Quillen (R)
▌2. Jimmy Duncan (R)
▌3. Marilyn Lloyd (D)
▌4. Jim Cooper (D)
▌5. Bob Clement (D)
▌6. Bart Gordon (D)
▌7. Don Sundquist (R)
▌8. John S. Tanner (D)
▌9. Harold Ford Sr. (D)

==== Texas ====
▌1. Jim Chapman (D)
▌2. Charlie Wilson (D)
▌3. Sam Johnson (R)
▌4. Ralph Hall (D)
▌5. John Wiley Bryant (D)
▌6. Joe Barton (R)
▌7. Bill Archer (R)
▌8. Jack Fields (R)
▌9. Jack Brooks (D)
▌10. J. J. Pickle (D)
▌11. Chet Edwards (D)
▌12. Pete Geren (D)
▌13. Bill Sarpalius (D)
▌14. Greg Laughlin (D)
▌15. Kika de la Garza (D)
▌16. Ronald D. Coleman (D)
▌17. Charles Stenholm (D)
▌18. Craig Washington (D)
▌19. Larry Combest (R)
▌20. Henry B. González (D)
▌21. Lamar Smith (R)
▌22. Tom DeLay (R)
▌23. Henry Bonilla (R)
▌24. Martin Frost (D)
▌25. Michael A. Andrews (D)
▌26. Dick Armey (R)
▌27. Solomon P. Ortiz (D)
▌28. Frank Tejeda (D)
▌29. Gene Green (D)
▌30. Eddie Bernice Johnson (D)

==== Utah ====
▌1. James V. Hansen (R)
▌2. Karen Shepherd (D)
▌3. Bill Orton (D)

==== Vermont ====
▌At-large. Bernie Sanders (I)

==== Virginia ====
▌1. Herbert H. Bateman (R)
▌2. Owen B. Pickett (D)
▌3. Bobby Scott (D)
▌4. Norman Sisisky (D)
▌5. Lewis F. Payne Jr. (D)
▌6. Bob Goodlatte (R)
▌7. Thomas J. Bliley Jr. (R)
▌8. Jim Moran (D)
▌9. Rick Boucher (D)
▌10. Frank Wolf (R)
▌11. Leslie Byrne (D)

==== Washington ====
▌1. Maria Cantwell (D)
▌2. Al Swift (D)
▌3. Jolene Unsoeld (D)
▌4. Jay Inslee (D)
▌5. Tom Foley (D)
▌6. Norm Dicks (D)
▌7. Jim McDermott (D)
▌8. Jennifer Dunn (R)
▌9. Mike Kreidler (D)

==== West Virginia ====
▌1. Alan Mollohan (D)
▌2. Bob Wise (D)
▌3. Nick Rahall (D)

==== Wisconsin ====
▌1. Les Aspin (D), until January 20, 1993

▌Peter W. Barca (D), from May 4, 1993

▌2. Scott L. Klug (R)
▌3. Steve Gunderson (R)
▌4. Jerry Kleczka (D)
▌5. Tom Barrett (D)
▌6. Tom Petri (R)
▌7. Dave Obey (D)
▌8. Toby Roth (R)
▌9. Jim Sensenbrenner (R)

==== Wyoming ====
▌At-large. Craig L. Thomas (R)

==== Non-voting members ====
▌American Samoa. Eni Faleomavaega (D)
▌District of Columbia. Eleanor Holmes Norton (D)
▌Guam. Robert A. Underwood (D)
▌Puerto Rico. Carlos Romero Barceló (Resident Commissioner) (D)
▌Virgin Islands. Ron de Lugo (D)

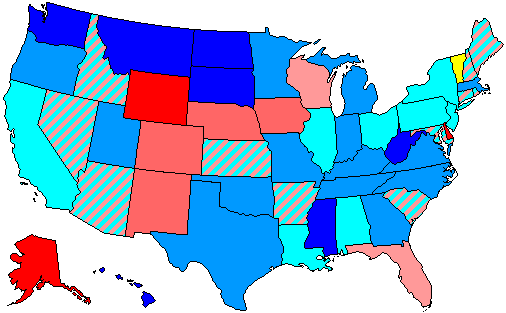
House seats by party holding plurality in state: 80+% Democratic / 80+% Republican; 60+ to 80% Democratic / 60+ to 80% Republican; Up to 60% Democratic / Up to 60% Republican; striped: 50–50 split 1 independent

House majority leadership

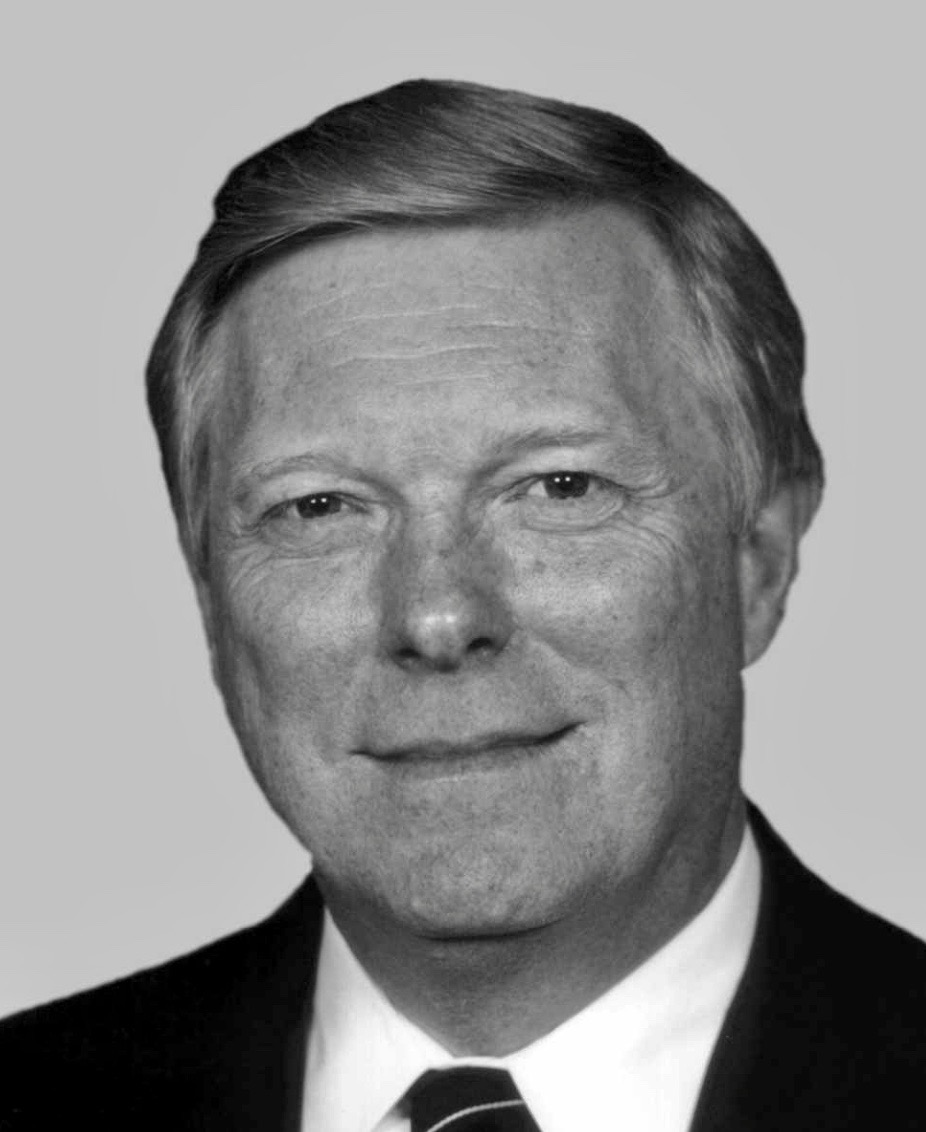
Democratic leader
Dick Gephardt

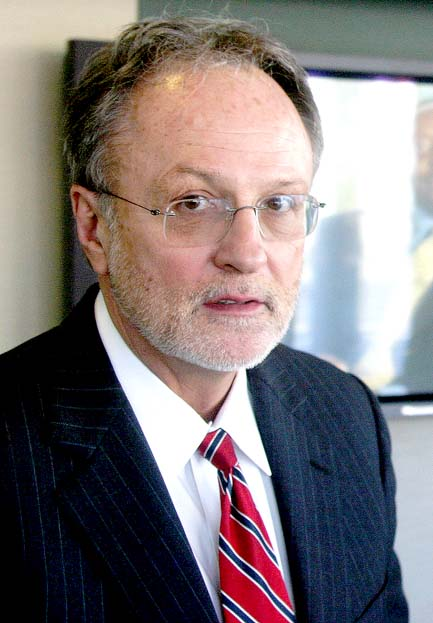
Democratic whip
David Bonior

House minority leadership

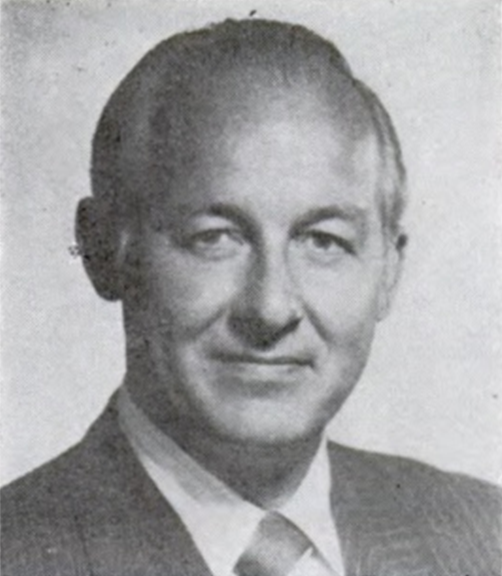
Republican leader
Bob Michel

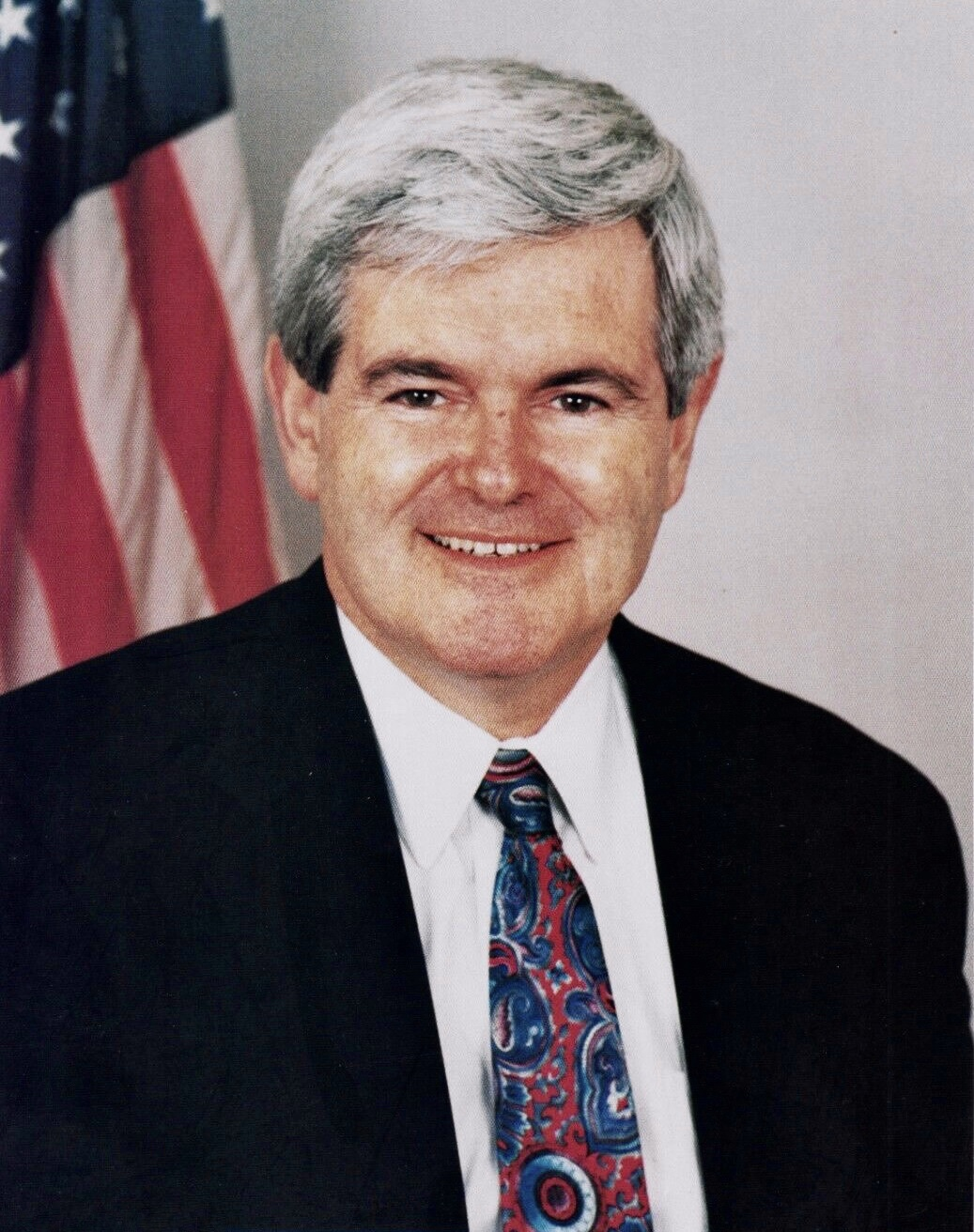
Republican whip
Newt Gingrich

== Changes in membership ==
=== Senate ===
Senate changes
State (class)	Vacated by	Reason for change	Successor	Date of successor's formal installation (Note: When seated or oath administered, not necessarily when service began.)
Texas (1)	Lloyd Bentsen (D)	Resigned January 20, 1993, to become United States Secretary of the Treasury. His successor was appointed.	Bob Krueger (D)	January 21, 1993
Texas (1)	Bob Krueger (D)	Interim appointee lost special election June 6, 1993. Successor elected to finish the term.	Kay Bailey Hutchison (R)	June 14, 1993
Alabama (3)	Richard Shelby (D)	Changed party November 9, 1994	Richard Shelby (R)	November 9, 1994
Oklahoma (2)	David Boren (D)	Resigned November 15, 1994, to become President of the University of Oklahoma. Successor elected on November 8, 1994, to finish the term ending January 3, 1997.	Jim Inhofe (R)	November 17, 1994
Tennessee (2)	Harlan Mathews (D)	Interim appointee did not seek election. Successor elected on November 8, 1994, to finish the term ending January 3, 1997.	Fred Thompson (R)	December 2, 1994

=== House of Representatives ===
House changes
District	Vacated by	Reason for change	Successor	Date of successor's formal installation
Wisconsin's 1st	Les Aspin (D)	Resigned January 20, 1993, to become United States Secretary of Defense	Peter W. Barca (D)	June 9, 1993
Mississippi's 2nd	Mike Espy (D)	Resigned January 22, 1993, to become United States Secretary of Agriculture	Bennie Thompson (D)	April 20, 1993
California's 17th	Leon Panetta (D)	Resigned January 23, 1993, to become Director of the Office of Management and Budget	Sam Farr (D)	June 16, 1993
Ohio 2nd	Bill Gradison (R)	Resigned January 31, 1993, to become president of the Health Insurance Association of America	Rob Portman (R)	June 10, 1993
Michigan 3rd	Paul B. Henry (R)	Died July 31, 1993	Vern Ehlers (R)	January 25, 1994
Oklahoma's 6th	Glenn English (D)	Resigned January 7, 1994, to become CEO of the National Rural Electric Cooperative Association	Frank Lucas (R)	May 17, 1994
Kentucky's 2nd	William Natcher (D)	Died March 29, 1994	Ron Lewis (R)	May 26, 1994
New Jersey 11th	Dean Gallo (R)	Died November 6, 1994	Vacant for remainder of term	
Oklahoma's 1st	Jim Inhofe (R)	Resigned November 15, 1994, when elected to the U.S. Senate	Steve Largent (R)	November 29, 1994

== Committees ==
Lists of committees and their party leaders for members of the House and Senate committees can be found through the Official Congressional Directory at the bottom of this article. The directory after the pages of terms of service lists committees of the Senate, House (Standing with Subcommittees, Select and Special) and Joint and, after that, House/Senate committee assignments. On the committees section of the House and Senate in the Official Congressional Directory, the committee's members on the first row on the left side shows the chairman of the committee and on the right side shows the ranking member of the committee.

=== Senate ===
- Aging (Special) (David Pryor, chair; William Cohen, Ranking member)
- United States Senate Committee on Agriculture, Nutrition and Forestry (Patrick Leahy, chair; Richard Lugar, Ranking Member)
  - Agricultural Credit (Kent Conrad, chair; Chuck Grassley, Ranking Member)
  - Agricultural Production and Stabilization of Prices (David Pryor, chair; Jesse Helms, Ranking Member)
  - Agricultural Research, Conservation, Forestry and General Legislation (Tom Daschle, chair; Larry E. Craig, Ranking Member)
  - Domestic and Foreign Marketing and Product Promotion (David L. Boren, chair; Thad Cochran, Ranking Member)
  - Nutrition and Investigations (Tom Harkin, chair; Mitch McConnell, Ranking Member)
  - Rural Development and Rural Electrification (Howell Heflin, chair; Paul Coverdell, Ranking Member)
- Appropriations (Robert C. Byrd, chair; Mark O. Hatfield, Ranking Member)
  - Agriculture, Rural Development and Related Agencies (Dale Bumpers, chair; Thad Cochran, Ranking Member)
  - Commerce, Justice, State and Judiciary (Ernest F. Hollings, chair; Pete Domenici, Ranking Member)
  - Defense (Daniel K. Inouye, chair; Ted Stevens, Ranking Member)
  - District of Columbia (Herb Kohl, chair; Conrad Burns, Ranking Member)
  - Energy and Water Development (J. Bennett Johnston, chair; Mark O. Hatfield, Ranking Member)
  - Foreign Operations (Patrick Leahy, chair; Mitch McConnell, Ranking Member)
  - Interior and Related Agencies (Robert C. Byrd, chair; Don Nickles, Ranking Member)
  - Labor, Health, Human Services and Education (Tom Harkin, chair; Arlen Specter, Ranking Member)
  - Legislative Branch (Harry Reid, chair; Connie Mack III, Ranking Member)
  - Military Construction (Jim Sasser, chair; Slade Gorton, Ranking Member)
  - Transportation and Related Agencies (Frank R. Lautenberg, chair; Al D'Amato, Ranking Member)
  - Treasury, Postal Service and General Government (Dennis DeConcini, chair; Chris Dodd, Ranking Member)
  - VA-HUD-Independent Agencies (Barbara A. Mikulski, chair; Phil Gramm, Ranking Member)
- Armed Services (Sam Nunn, chair; Strom Thurmond, Ranking Member)
  - Nuclear Deterrence, Arms Control and Defense Intelligence (J. James Exon, chair; Trent Lott, Ranking Member)
  - Coalition Defense and Reinforcing Forces (Carl Levin, chair; John Warner, Ranking Member)
  - Regional Defense and Contingency Forces (Edward Kennedy, chair; William S. Cohen, Ranking Member)
  - Defense Technology, Acquisition and Industrial Base (Jeff Bingaman, chair; Robert C. Smith, Ranking Member)
  - Military Readiness (John Glenn, chair; John McCain, Ranking Member)
  - Force Requirements and Personnel (Richard C. Shelby, chair; Dan Coats, Ranking Member)
- Banking, Housing and Urban Affairs (Donald W. Riegle Jr., chair; Al D'Amato, Ranking Member)
  - Housing and Urban Affairs (Paul Sarbanes, chair; Kit Bond, Ranking Member)
  - International Finance and Monetary Policy (Jim Sasser, chair; Connie Mack III, Ranking Member)
  - Securities (Chris Dodd, chair; Phil Gramm, Ranking Member)
  - Economic Stabilization and Rural Development (Richard Shelby, chair; Lauch Faircloth, Ranking Member)
- Budget (Jim Sasser, chair; Pete Domenici, Ranking Member)
- Commerce, Science and Transportation (Ernest F. Hollings, chair; John Danforth, Ranking Member)
  - Aviation (Wendell H. Ford, chair; Larry Pressler, Ranking Member)
  - Communications (Daniel K. Inouye, chair; Bob Packwood, Ranking Member)
  - Consumer (Richard H. Bryan, chair; Slade Gorton, Ranking Member)
  - Foreign Commerce and Tourism (John F. Kerry, chair; Bob Packwood, Ranking Member)
  - Merchant Marine (John Breaux, chair; Trent Lott, Ranking Member)
  - Science, Technology and Space (John D. Rockefeller IV, chair; Conrad Burns, Ranking Member)
  - Surface Transportation (J. James Exon, chair; John McCain, Ranking Member)
  - National Ocean Policy Study (Ernest Hollings, chair; Ted Stevens, Ranking Member)
- Energy and Natural Resources (J. Bennett Johnston, chair; Malcolm Wallop, Ranking Member)
  - Energy Research and Development (Wendell H. Ford, chair; Pete Domenici, Ranking member)
  - Mineral Resources Development and Production (Daniel Akaka, chair; Larry E. Craig, Ranking member)
  - Public Lands, National Parks and Forests (Dale Bumpers, chair; Frank Murkowski, Ranking member)
  - Renewable Energy, Energy Efficiency and Competitiveness (Jeff Bingaman, chair; Don Nickles, Ranking member)
  - Water and Power (Bill Bradley, chair; Robert F. Bennett, Ranking member)
- Environment and Public Works (Max Baucus, chair; John H. Chafee, Ranking Member)
  - Water Resources, Transportation, Public Buildings and Economic Development (Daniel Moynihan, chair; John Warner, Ranking member)
  - Superfund, Recycling and Solid Waste Management (Frank Lautenberg, chair; David Durenberger, Ranking member)
  - Toxic Substances, Research and Development (Harry Reid, chair; Bob Smith, Ranking member)
  - Clean Water, Fisheries and Wildlife (Bob Graham, chair; John Chafee, Ranking member)
  - Clean Air and Nuclear Regulation (Joe Lieberman, chair; Alan K. Simpson, Ranking member)
- Ethics (Select) (Richard Bryan, chair; Mitch McConnell, Ranking member)
- Finance (Daniel Moynihan, chair; Bob Packwood, Ranking Member)
  - Deficits, Debt Management and Long-Term Economic Growth (Bill Bradley, chair; Malcolm Wallop, Ranking member)
  - Energy and Agricultural Taxation (Tom Daschle, chair; Orrin Hatch, Ranking member)
  - Health for Families and the Uninsured (Donald W. Riegle Jr., chair; John H. Chafee, Ranking member)
  - International Trade (Max Baucus, chair; John Chafee, Ranking member)
  - Medicare and Long Term Care (Jay Rockefeller, chair; David Durenberger, Ranking member)
  - Private Retirement Plans and Oversight of the Internal Revenue Service (David Pryor, chair; Chuck Grassley, Ranking member)
  - Social Security and Family Policy (John Breaux, chair; Bob Dole, Ranking member)
  - Taxation (David L. Boren, chair; William V. Roth Jr., Ranking member)
- Foreign Relations (Claiborne Pell, chair; Jesse Helms, Ranking Member)
  - International Economic Policy, Trade, Oceans and Environment (Paul Sarbanes, chair; Nancy Kassebaum, Ranking member)
  - Western Hemisphere and Peace Corps Affairs (Chris Dodd, chair; Paul Coverdell, Ranking member)
  - Terrorism, Narcotics and International Communications (John Kerry, chair; Larry Pressler, Ranking member)
  - African Affairs (Paul Simon, chair; Jim Jeffords, Ranking member)
  - European Affairs (Joe Biden, chair; Richard Lugar, Ranking member)
  - Near Eastern and South Asian Affairs (Daniel Moynihan, chair; Hank Brown, Ranking member)
  - East Asian and Pacific Affairs (Chuck Robb, chair; Frank Murkowski, Ranking member)
- Governmental Affairs (John Glenn, chair; Bill Roth, Ranking Member)
  - Federal Services, Post Office and Civil Service (David Pryor, chair; Ted Stevens, Ranking member)
  - General Services, Federalism and the District of Columbia (Jim Sasser, chair; John McCain, Ranking member)
  - Oversight of Government Management (Carl Levin, chair; William Cohen, Ranking member)
  - Permanent Subcommittee on Investigations (Sam Nunn, chair; William V. Roth Jr., Ranking member)
  - Regulation and Government Information (Joe Lieberman, chair; Thad Cochran, Ranking member)
- Indian Affairs (Daniel K. Inouye, chair; John McCain, Ranking Member)
- Judiciary (Joe Biden, chair; Orrin Hatch, Ranking Member)
  - Antitrust, Monopolies and Business Rights (Howard Metzenbaum, chair; Strom Thurmond, Ranking member)
  - Constitution (Paul Simon, chair; Hank Brown, Ranking member)
  - Courts and Administration Practice (Howell Heflin, chair; Chuck Grassley, Ranking member)
  - Immigration and Refugee Affairs (Ted Kennedy, chair; Alan K. Simpson, Ranking member)
  - Juvenile Justice (Herb Kohl, chair; William Cohen, Ranking member)
  - Patents, Copyrights and Trademarks (Dennis DeConcini, chair; Orrin Hatch, Ranking member)
  - Technology and the Law (Patrick Leahy, chair; Arlen Specter, Ranking member)
- Intelligence (Select) (Dennis DeConcini, chair; John Warner, Ranking member)
- Labor and Human Resources (Edward M. Kennedy, chair; Nancy Landon Kassebaum, Ranking Member)
  - Labor (Howard Metzenbaum, chair; Orrin Hatch, Ranking member)
  - Education, Arts and Humanities (Claiborne Pell, chair; Jim Jeffords, Ranking member)
  - Employment and Productivity (Paul Simon, chair; Strom Thurmond, Ranking member)
  - Disability Policy (Tom Harkin, chair; David Durenberger, Ranking member)
  - Children, Family, Drugs and Alcoholism (Chris Dodd, chair; Dan Coats, Ranking member)
  - Aging (Barbara Mikulski, chair; Judd Gregg, Ranking member)
- Rules and Administration (Wendell H. Ford, chair; Ted Stevens, Ranking Member)
- Small Business (Dale Bumpers, chair; Larry Pressler, Ranking Member)
  - Competitiveness, Capital Formation and Economic Opportunity (Joe Lieberman, chair; Connie Mack III, Ranking member)
  - Export Expansion and Agricultural Development (Harris Wofford, chair; Paul Coverdell, Ranking member)
  - Government Contracting and Paperwork Reduction (Sam Nunn, chair; Kit Bond, Ranking member)
  - Innovation, Technology and Productivity (Carl Levin, chair; Conrad Burns, Ranking member)
  - Rural Economy and Family Farming (Paul Wellstone, chair; Larry Pressler, Ranking member)
  - Urban and Minority-Owned Business Development (John Kerry, chair; John Chafee, Ranking member)
- Veterans' Affairs (John D. Rockefeller IV, chair; Frank H. Murkowski, Ranking Member)

=== House of Representatives ===
- Agriculture (Kika de la Garza, chair; Pat Roberts, Ranking member)
  - General Farm Commodities (Tim Johnson, chair; Bill Emerson, Ranking member)
  - Livestock (Harold Volkmer, chair; Steve Gunderson, Ranking member)
  - Specialty Crops and Natural Resources (Charlie Rose, chair; Tom Lewis, Ranking member)
  - Department Operations and Nutrition (Charles W. Stenholm, chair; Bob Smith, Ranking member)
  - Environment, Credit and Rural Development (Glenn English, chair; Larry Combest, Ranking member)
  - Foreign Agriculture and Hunger (Tim Penny, chair; Wayne Allard, Ranking member)
- Appropriations (William Huston Natcher, then Dave Obey, chair; Joseph M. McDade, Ranking member)
  - Commerce, Justice, State and the Judiciary (Neal Edward Smith, chair; Hal Rogers, Ranking member)
  - Defense (John P. Murtha, chair; Joseph McDade, Ranking member)
  - District of Columbia (Julian C. Dixon, chair; James T. Walsh, Ranking member)
  - Energy and Water Development (Tom Bevill, chair; John T. Myers, Ranking member)
  - Foreign Operations, Export Financing and Related Programs (David Obey, chair; Bob Livingston, Ranking member)
  - Interior (Sidney Yates, chair; Ralph Regula, Ranking member)
  - Labor, Health, Human Services, Education and Related Agencies (William Huston Natcher, chair; John Edward Porter, Ranking member)
  - Legislative (Vic Fazio, chair; Bill Young, Ranking member)
  - Military Construction (Bill Hefner, chair; Barbara Vucanovich, Ranking member)
  - Agriculture, Rural Development and Related Agencies (Richard J. Durbin, chair; Joe Skeen, Ranking member)
  - Transportation (Bob Carr, chair; Frank Wolf, Ranking member)
  - Treasury, Postal Service and General Government (Steny Hoyer, chair; Jim Lightfoot, Ranking member)
  - VA, HUD and Independent Agencies (Louis Stokes, chair; Jerry Lewis, Ranking member)
- Armed Services (Ron Dellums, chair; Floyd Spence, Ranking member)
  - Military Acquisition (Ron Dellums, chair; Floyd Spence, Ranking member)
  - Research and Development (Patricia Schroeder, chair; Bob Stump, Ranking member)
  - Readiness (Earl Hutto, chair; John Kasich, Ranking member)
  - Military Forces and Personnel (Ike Skelton, chair; Jon Kyl, Ranking member)
  - Military Installations and Facilities (Dave McCurdy, chair; Duncan L. Hunter, Ranking member)
  - Oversight and Investigations (Norman Sisisky, chair; James Hansen, Ranking member)
- Banking, Finance and Urban Affairs (Henry B. Gonzalez, chair; Jim Leach, Ranking member)
  - Housing and Community Development (Henry B. Gonzalez, chair; Marge Roukema, Ranking member)
  - Financial Institutions Supervision, Regulation and Deposit Insurance (Stephen L. Neal, chair; Bill McCollum, Ranking member)
  - International Development, Finance, Trade and Monetary Policy (Barney Frank, chair; Doug Bereuter, Ranking member)
  - Economic Growth and Credit Formation (Paul Kanjorski, chair; Tom Ridge, Ranking member)
  - Consumer Credit and Insurance (Joseph P. Kennedy II, chair; Al McCandless, Ranking member)
  - General Oversight, Investigations and the Resolution of Failed Financial Institutions (Floyd H. Flake, chair; Toby Roth, Ranking member)
- Budget (Martin Olav Sabo, chair; John Kasich, Ranking member)
- District of Columbia (Pete Stark, chair; John Kasich, Ranking member)
  - Fiscal Affairs and Health (Jim McDermott, chair; Cass Ballenger, Ranking member)
  - Government Operations and Metropolitan Affairs (Alan Wheat, chair; Jim Saxton, Ranking member)
  - Judiciary and Education (Eleanor Holmes Norton, chair; Dana Rohrabacher, Ranking member)
- Education and Labor (William D. Ford, chair; Bill Goodling, Ranking member)
  - Postsecondary Education and Training (William D. Ford, chair; Tom Petri, Ranking member)
  - Labor Standards, Occupational Health and Safety (Austin J. Murphy, chair; Harris W. Fawell, Ranking member)
  - Elementary, Secondary and Vocational Education (Dale Kildee, chair; William F. Goodling, Ranking member)
  - Labor-Management Relations (Pat Williams, chair; Marge Roukema, Ranking member)
  - Human Resources (Matthew G. Martinez, chair; Paul B. Henry, Ranking member)
  - Select Education and Rights (Major R. Owens, chair; Cass Ballenger, Ranking member)
- Energy and Commerce (John Dingell, chair; Carlos J. Moorhead, Ranking member)
  - Oversight and Investigations (John D. Dingell, chair; Dan Schaefer, Ranking member)
  - Health and the Environment (Henry Waxman, chair; Thomas J. Bliley Jr., Ranking member)
  - Energy and Power (Philip Sharp, chair; Michael Bilirakis, Ranking member)
  - Telecommunications and Finance (Ed Markey, chair; Jack Fields, Ranking member)
  - Transportation and Hazardous Materials (Al Swift, chair; [data missing], Ranking member)
  - Commerce, Transportation and Competitiveness (Cardiss Collins, chair; Cliff Stearns, Ranking member)
- Foreign Affairs (Lee H. Hamilton, chair; Benjamin A. Gilman, Ranking member)
  - Europe and the Middle East (Lee H. Hamilton, chair; Benjamin A. Gilman, Ranking member)
  - Economic Policy, Trade and Environment (Sam Gejdenson, chair; Toby Roth, Ranking member)
  - International Security, International Organizations and Human Rights (Tom Lantos, chair; Doug Bereuter, Ranking member)
  - Western Hemisphere Affairs (Robert Torricelli, chair; Chris Smith, Ranking member)
  - International Operations (Howard Berman, chair; Olympia Snowe, Ranking member)
  - Asia and the Pacific (Gary L. Ackerman, chair; Jim Leach, Ranking member)
  - Africa (Harry Johnston, chair; Dan Burton, Ranking member)
- Government Operations (John Conyers, chair; William F. Clinger, Ranking member)
  - Legislation and National Security (John Conyers, chair; Al McCandless, Ranking member)
  - Environment, Energy and Natural Resources (Mike Synar, chair; Dennis Hastert, Ranking member)
  - Human Resources and Intergovernmental Relations (Edolphus Towns, chair; Steven Schiff, Ranking member)
  - Commerce, Consumer and Monetary Affairs (John M. Spratt, chair; Christopher Cox, Ranking member)
  - Information, Justice, Transportation and Agriculture (Gary Condit, chair; Craig L. Thomas, Ranking member)
  - Employment, Housing and Aviation (Collin C. Peterson, chair; Ronald K. Machtley, Ranking member)
- House Administration (Charlie Rose, chair; Bill Thomas, Ranking member)
  - Elections (Al Swift, chair; Bob Livingston, Ranking member)
  - Libraries and Memorials (Bill Clay, chair; Bill Barrett, Ranking member)
  - Office Systems (Sam Gejdenson, chair; John Boehner, Ranking member)
  - Accounts (Martin Frost, chair; Pat Roberts, Ranking member)
  - Personnel and Police (Thomas J. Manton, chair; Jennifer Dunn, Ranking member)
  - Administrative Oversight (Charlie Rose, chair; Bill Thomas, Ranking member)
- Judiciary (Jack Brooks, chair; Hamilton Fish, Ranking member)
  - Economic and Commercial Law (Jack Brooks, chair; Hamilton Fish Jr., Ranking member)
  - Civil and Constitutional Rights (Don Edwards, chair; Henry J. Hyde, Ranking member)
  - Intellectual Property and Judicial Administration (William J. Hughes, chair; Carlos J. Moorhead, Ranking member)
  - Crime and Criminal Justice (Chuck Schumer, chair; Jim Sensenbrenner, Ranking member)
  - Administrative Law and Governmental Relations (John Bryant, chair; George Gekas, Ranking member)
- Merchant Marine and Fisheries (Gerry Studds, chair; Jack Fields, Ranking member)
  - Merchant Marine (Bill Lipinski, chair; Herbert Bateman, Ranking member)
  - Environment and Natural Resources (Gerry E. Studds, chair; Jim Saxton, Ranking member)
  - Fisheries Management (Thomas J. Manton, chair; Don Young, Ranking member)
  - Oceanography, Gulf of Mexico and the Outer Continental Shelf (Solomon P. Ortiz, chair; Curt Weldon, Ranking member)
  - Coast Guard and Navigation (Billy Tauzin, chair; Howard Coble, Ranking member)
- Natural Resources (George Miller, chair; Don Young, Ranking member)
  - Oversight and Investigations (George Miller, chair; Bob Smith, Ranking member)
  - Native American Affairs (Bill Richardson, chair; Bob Smith, Ranking member)
  - National Parks, Forests and Public Lands (Bruce Vento, chair; Jim Hansen, Ranking member)
  - Insular and International Affairs (Ron de Lugo, chair; Elton Gallegly, Ranking member)
  - Energy and Mineral Resources (Richard H. Lehman, chair; Barbara Vucanovich, Ranking member)
- Post Office and Civil Service (Bill Clay, chair; John T. Myers, Ranking member)
  - Oversight and Investigations (Bill Clay, chair; Sherwood Boehlert, Ranking member)
  - Civil Service (Frank McCloskey, chair; Dan Burton, Ranking member)
  - Census, Statistics and Portal Personnel (Thomas C. Sawyer, chair; Tom Petri, Ranking member)
  - Compensation and Employee Benefits (Eleanor Holmes Norton, chair; Constance Morella, Ranking member)
  - Postal Operations and Services (Barbara-Rose Collins, chair; Don Young, Ranking member)
- Public Works and Transportation (Norman Mineta, chair; Bud Shuster, Ranking member)
  - Aviation (Jim Oberstar, chair; Bill Clinger, Ranking member)
  - Economic Development (Bob Wise, chair; Susan Molinari, Ranking member)
  - Investigations and Oversight (Robert Borski, chair; Jim Inhofe, Ranking member)
  - Public Buildings and Grounds (James Traficant, chair; John Duncan, Ranking member)
  - Surface Transportation (Nick Rahall, chair; Tom Petri, Ranking member)
  - Water Resources and Environment (Douglas Applegate, chair; Sherwood Boehlert, Ranking member)
- Rules (Joe Moakley, chair; Gerald B.H. Solomon, Ranking member)
  - Rules of the House (Anthony Beilenson, chair; David Dreier, Ranking member)
  - Legislative Process (Butler Derrick, chair; Jimmy Quillen, Ranking member)
- Science, Space and Technology (George Brown Jr., chair; Robert S. Walker, Ranking member)
  - Energy (Marilyn Lloyd, chair; Harris Fawell, Ranking member)
  - Space (Ralph Hall, chair; Jim Sensenbrenner, Ranking member)
  - Technology, Environment and Aviation (Tim Valentine, chair; Tom Lewis, Ranking member)
  - Science (Rick Boucher, chair; Sherwood Boehlert, Ranking member)
  - Investigations and Oversight (Jimmy Hayes, chair; Paul B. Henry, Ranking member)
- Small Business (John J. LaFalce, chair; Jan Meyers, Ranking member)
  - SBA Legislation and the General Economy (John J. LaFalce, chair; Jan Meyers, Ranking member)
  - Regulation, Business Opportunities and Technology (Ron Wyden, chair; Larry Combest, Ranking member)
  - Procurement, Taxation and Tourism (James H. Bilbray, chair; Richard Baker, Ranking member)
  - Minority Enterprise, Finance and Urban Development (Kweisi Mfume, chair; Ronald K. Machtley, Ranking member)
  - Rural Enterprises, Exports and the Environment (Bill Sarpalius, chair; Joel Hefley, Ranking member)
- Standards of Official Conduct (Jim McDermott, chair; Fred Grandy, Ranking member)
- Veterans' Affairs (Gillespie V. Montgomery, chair; Bob Stump, Ranking member)
  - Education, Training and Employment (Sonny Montgomery, chair; Tim Hutchinson, Ranking member)
  - Compensation, Pension and Insurance (Jim Slattery, chair; Michael Bilirakis, Ranking member)
  - Oversight and Investigations (Lane Evans, chair; Tom Ridge, Ranking member)
  - Hospitals and Health Care (J. Roy Rowland, chair; Chris Smith, Ranking member)
  - Housing and Memorial Affairs (George E. Sangmeister, chair; Dan Burton, Ranking member)
- Ways and Means (Dan Rostenkowski, chair, Sam Gibbons, acting; Bill Archer, Ranking member)
  - Trade (Sam Gibbons, chair; Phil Crane, Ranking member)
  - Oversight (J.J. Pickle, chair; Amo Houghton, Ranking member)
  - Select Revenue Measures (Charles Rangel, chair; Mel Hancock, Ranking member)
  - Health (Pete Stark, chair; Bill Thomas, Ranking member)
  - Social Security (Andrew Jacobs Jr., chair; Jim Bunning, Ranking member)
  - Human Resources (Harold Ford Sr., chair; Rick Santorum, Ranking member)
- Whole

=== Joint ===
- Economic (Rep. Dave Obey, chair; Sen. Paul Sarbanes, Vice Chair)
- Taxation (Rep. Dan Rostenkowski, chair; Sen. Daniel P. Moynihan, Vice Chair)
- The Library (Rep. Charlie Rose, chair; Sen. Claiborne Pell, Vice Chair)
- Organization of Congress (Sen. David L. Boren, Co-Chair; Rep. Lee H. Hamilton, Co-Chair)
- Printing (Sen. Wendell Ford, chair; Rep. Charlie Rose, Vice Chair)

== Caucuses ==
- Armenian Caucus
- Biomedical Research Caucus
- Blue Dog Coalition
- Congressional Arts Caucus
- Congressional Asian Pacific American Caucus
- Congressional Automotive Caucus
- Congressional Black Caucus
- Congressional Caucus on India and Indian Americans
- Congressional Caucus on Korea
- Congressional Fire Services Caucus
- Congressional Friends of Ireland Caucus
- Congressional Hispanic Caucus
- Congressional Pediatric & Adult Hydrocephalus Caucus
- Congressional Progressive Caucus
- Congressional Travel & Tourism Caucus
- Congressional Western Caucus
- Congresswomen's Caucus
- House Democratic Caucus
- Law Enforcement Caucus
- Northern Border Caucus
- Senate Democratic Caucus

== Employees ==
=== Legislative branch agency directors ===
- Architect of the Capitol: George Malcolm White
- Attending Physician of the United States Congress: Robert Krasner, until 1994
  - John F. Eisold, from 1994
- Comptroller General of the United States: Charles A. Bowsher
- Director of the Congressional Budget Office: Robert D. Reischauer
- Librarian of Congress: James H. Billington
- Public Printer of the United States: Robert Houk, until 1993
  - Michael F. DiMario, from 1993

=== Senate ===
- Chaplain: Richard C. Halverson (Presbyterian)
- Curator: James R. Ketchum
- Historian: Richard A. Baker
- Parliamentarian: Alan Frumin
- Secretary: Walter J. Stewart, until April 15, 1994
  - Martha S. Pope, from April 15, 1994
- Librarian: Roger K. Haley
- Secretary for the Majority: C. Abbott Saffold
- Secretary for the Minority: Howard O. Greene Jr.
- Sergeant at Arms: Martha S. Pope, until April 14, 1994
  - Robert L. Benoit, from April 15, 1994

=== House of Representatives ===
- Chaplain: James D. Ford (Lutheran)
- Clerk: Donnald K. Anderson
- Director of Non-Legislative and Financial Services: Leonard P. Wishart III, until January 1994
  - Randall B. Medlock, from January 1994
- Doorkeeper: James T. Molloy
- Historian: Ray Smock
- Reading Clerks: Meg Goetz (D) and Paul Hays (R)
- Parliamentarian: William H. Brown, until September 16, 1994
  - Charles W. Johnson III, from September 16, 1994
- Sergeant at Arms: Werner W. Brandt
- Inspector General: John W. Lainhart IV

== See also ==
- List of new members of the 103rd United States Congress
- 1992 United States elections (elections leading to this Congress)
  - 1992 United States presidential election
  - 1992 United States Senate elections
  - 1992 United States House of Representatives elections
- 1994 United States elections (elections during this Congress, leading to the next Congress)
  - 1994 United States Senate elections
  - 1994 United States House of Representatives elections
