= United States Senate Librarian =

Chief librarian of the United States Senate Library

The United States Senate librarian is the chief librarian of the United States Senate Library. The Senate librarian reports to the secretary of the United States Senate. The current librarian is Meghan Dunn.

No.	Image	Librarian	Term	Notes
1		George S. Wagner	July 1, 1871—1875	
2		George F. Dawson	1875—1879	
3		P. J. Pierce	1879—1884	
4		George M. Weston	1884—1887	
5		Alonzo W. Church	1887—1901	
–		James M. Baker (acting)	1898—1901	
–		Cliff Warden (acting)	1901—1904	
–		James M. Baker (acting)	1904	
–		Edward C. Goodwin (acting)	1904—1906	
6		Edward C. Goodwin	1906—1921	
7		Walter P. Scott	1921—1923	
8		Edward C. Goodwin	1923—1930	
9		James D. Preston	1931—1935	
10		Ruskin McArdle	1935—1947	
11		George W. Straubinger	1947—1951	
12		Richard D. Hupman	1951—1953	
13		Sterling Dean	1953—1954	
–		Richard D. Hupman (acting)	1954	
14		Gus J. Miller	1954—1955	
15		Richard D. Hupman	1955—1973	
16		Roger K. Haley	1973—1997	
17		Greg Harness	1997—January 31, 2008	
18		Mary E. Cornaby	2008—2009	
19		Leona I. Faust	2009—June 22, 2022	died in office
20		Meghan Dunn	June 23, 2022—present	
