= John H. Graham =

American politician

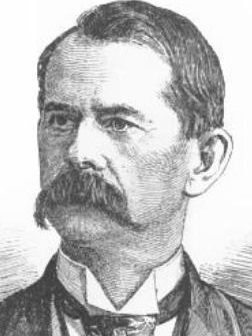

Member of the U.S. House of Representatives from New York's 5th district
- In office March 4, 1893 – March 3, 1895
- Preceded by: Thomas F. Magner
- Succeeded by: Charles G. Bennett

Personal details
- Born: April 1, 1835 Belfast, Ireland
- Died: July 11, 1895 (aged 60) Brooklyn, New York, U.S.

John Hugh Graham (April 1, 1835 – July 11, 1895) was an American educator, businessman, Civil War veteran, and politician who served one term as a U.S. representative from New York from 1893 to 1895.

== Early life and education ==
Born in Belfast, Ireland, Graham emigrated in 1836 to the United States with his parents, who settled in Brooklyn, New York. He attended the public schools of Brooklyn.

=== Civil War ===
During the Civil War, he was recruited into Company A, 5th New York Heavy Artillery Regiment, and served three years as its captain.

For gallant and meritorious services at Harper's Ferry and in the Shenandoah Valley, Virginia, he was commissioned major and brevetted lieutenant colonel.

== Post-war career ==
After the war, Graham engaged in the hardware business in Brooklyn, New York.

=== Congress ===
Graham was elected as a Democrat to the Fifty-third Congress (March 4, 1893 – March 3, 1895). He was not a candidate for renomination in 1894.

=== Death ===
Graham died in Brooklyn, New York, on July 11, 1895.

U.S. House of Representatives
Preceded by Thomas F. Magner	Member of the U.S. House of Representatives from New York's 5th congressional district 1893–1895	Succeeded by Charles G. Bennett
