= Martha S. Pope =

American public servant

Senior Advisor for the Northern Ireland Peace Negotiations
- In office January 4, 1995 – July 1998
- President: Bill Clinton

26th Secretary of the United States Senate
- In office April 15, 1994 – January 3, 1995
- Leader: George J. Mitchell
- Preceded by: Walter J. Stewart
- Succeeded by: Sheila P. Burke

31st Sergeant at Arms of the United States Senate
- In office January 3, 1991 – April 14, 1994
- Leader: George J. Mitchell
- Preceded by: Henry K. Giugni
- Succeeded by: Robert Laurent Benoit

Personal details
- Born: 1945 or 1946 (age 80–81) New Castle, Pennsylvania, U.S.
- Education: University of Connecticut (BA); Southern Connecticut State University (MA)

Martha S. Pope is an American public servant who participated in peace initiatives in Northern Ireland that led to the Good Friday Agreement in 1998. She also served as the sergeant at arms of the United States Senate from 1991 to 1994, the first woman to hold the role. She briefly served as Secretary of the United States Senate for a few months in 1994 before she was asked to assist in the Northern Ireland peace process. Pope is the only person in the history of the U.S. Senate to hold both the important Secretary and Sergeant at Arms positions. She was also Chief of Staff to Senate Majority Leader George J. Mitchell. She is also a pastel artist.

== Early life and education ==
Pope was born in New Castle, Pennsylvania but grew up in Connecticut. She received a Bachelor of Arts from the University of Connecticut in 1967, where she majored in sociology and anthropology and minored in art before earning a master’s degree in art education at Southern Connecticut State University.

== Career in public service ==
After teaching art for five years in elementary and junior high school, Pope moved to Washington, D.C., to work for Senator Gary Hart from 1975 to 1977. In 1977, Pope left Capitol Hill to work for the National Wildlife Federation, only to return to the Hill in 1979 to work for Senator John Culver. When Culver lost his bid for reelection in 1980, Senator George J. Mitchell kept her on at the Environment and Public Works Committee staff before hiring her first as his administrative assistant in 1985 and later as the chief of staff in 1989 when he became majority leader. In 1989, the second edition of The Almanac of the Unelected characterize her as "glue - she makes things work."

In 1991, Mitchell had Pope appointed Sergeant at Arms to replace the retiring Henry K. Giugni. While serving as Sergeant at Arms, Pope updated the Senate's antiquated dress code in 1993 to allow women to wear pants on the Senate floor so long as they also wore a jacket. This brought the Senate dress code rules more inline with contemporary rules used in the business world, in state legislatures, and in the House of Representatives. After Walter J. Stewart announced his retirement as Secretary to the Senate in 1994, Mitchell made arrangements so that Pope would succeed Stewart as Secretary prior to Mitchell's own planned retirement from the Senate.

In January 1995, Pope left her job at the Senate to assist her former boss, the newly appointed United States Special Envoy for Northern Ireland and former Senator Mitchell, as Senior Advisor for the Northern Ireland Peace Negotiations until July 1998, after the peace agreement went in effect.

In recognition of "her outstanding contribution to peace talks, which led to the Good Friday Agreement", Pope was awarded an honorary degree of Doctor of Laws (LLD) from Ulster University on July 4, 2019.

In 2001, Pope became a member of the Hofstra University board of trustees.

Government offices
Preceded by Henry K. Giugni	31st Sergeant at Arms of the United States Senate; 1991 – 1994	Succeeded by Robert Laurent Benoit
Preceded by Walter J. Stewart	26th Secretary of the United States Senate; 1994 – 1995	Succeeded by Sheila P. Burke
Diplomatic posts
New office	Senior Advisor for the Northern Ireland Peace Negotiations; 1995 – 1998	End of position
