= Jackie Barber =

American attorney and government official

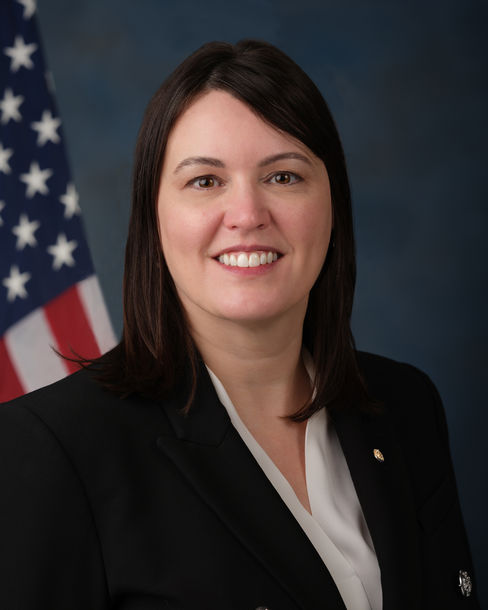
- Official portrait, 2025

35th Secretary of the United States Senate
- Incumbent
- Assumed office January 3, 2025
- Leader: John Thune
- Preceded by: Sonceria Berry

Personal details
- Born: Onida, South Dakota, U.S.
- Party: Republican
- Education: University of South Dakota (BS, JD)
- Profession: Attorney

Jackie Barber is an American attorney and government official serving as the 35th Secretary of the United States Senate. She assumed office on January 3, 2025, following her election by the Senate during the 119th Congress.

== Early life and education ==
Barber was born in Onida, South Dakota. She earned a Bachelor of Science degree in business administration with a double major in chemistry from the University of South Dakota and Juris Doctor.

== Career ==
Prior to her appointment as Secretary of the Senate, Barber held several key legal and administrative roles within the U.S. Congress. She served as staff director for the Senate Committee on Rules and Administration under Senator Deb Fischer. Additionally, she was Chief Counsel for the Senate Committee on Agriculture, Nutrition, and Forestry for Senator John Boozman, and held positions as Chief Counsel and Deputy Staff Director for the Senate Committee on Rules and Administration, as well as Chief Counsel to the Joint Congressional Committee on Inaugural Ceremonies, both under Senator Roy Blunt.

Barber has been involved in significant legislative and institutional initiatives, including the passage of the 2018 Farm Bill, the Electoral Count Reform Act, and the planning and execution of the 59th inaugural ceremonies. She played a role in maintaining Senate operations during the COVID-19 pandemic.
