= Sheila P. Burke =

American nurse and policy advisor (born 1950/51)

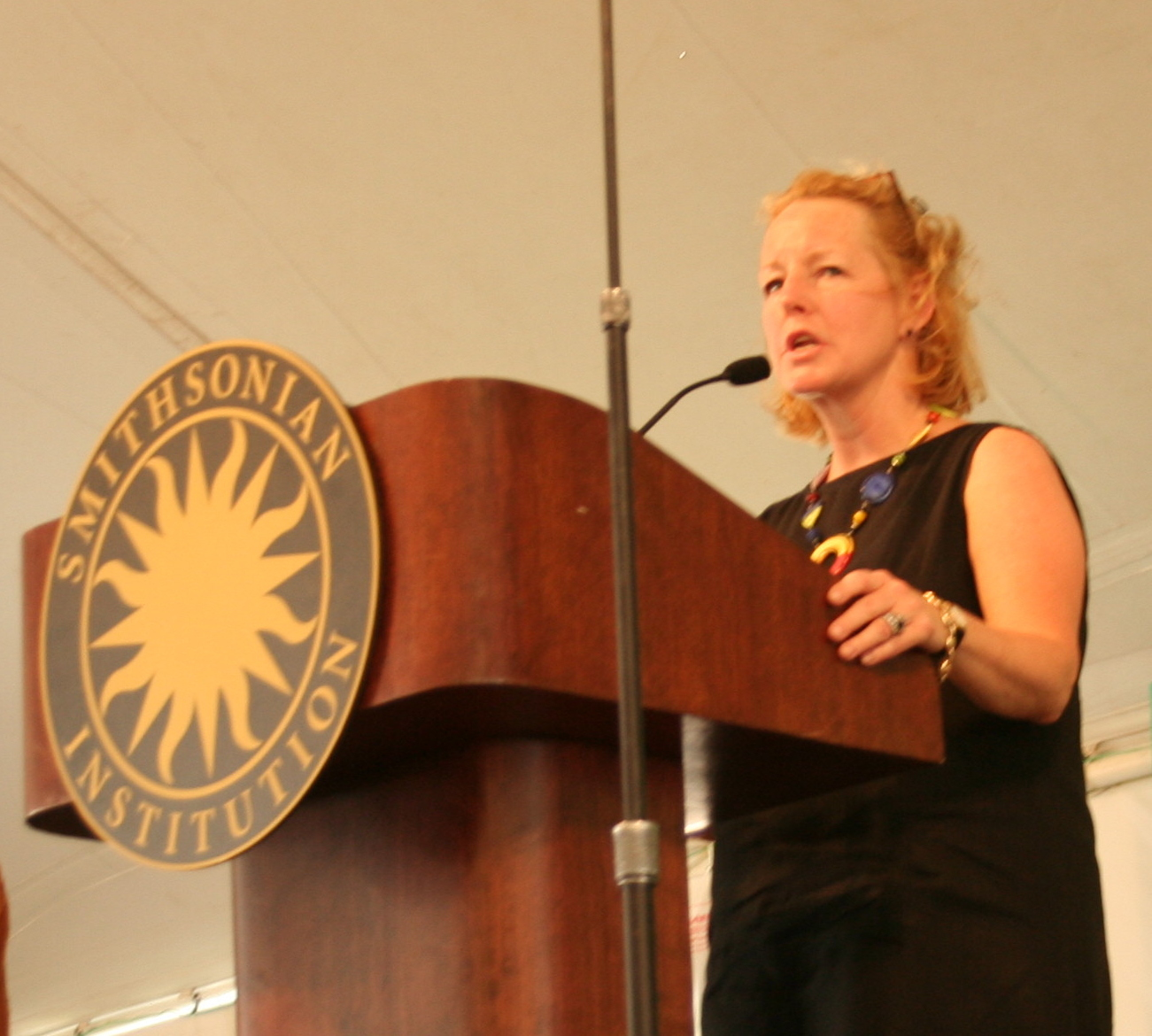
- Burke in 2007

27th Secretary of the United States Senate
- In office January 4, 1995 – June 7, 1995
- Leader: Bob Dole
- Preceded by: Martha S. Pope
- Succeeded by: Kelly D. Johnston

Personal details
- Born: 1950 or 1951 (age 75–76)
- Education: University of San Francisco (BSN); Harvard University (MPA)

Sheila P. Burke (born 1950 or 1951) is an American strategic advisor known for her work in health care and government finance. She was chief of staff to Bob Dole and Secretary of the United States Senate. Her subsequent work was at the Smithsonian Institution and, as of 2023, she is a strategic advisor at the law firm Baker Donelson.

== Early life and education ==
Burke was raised in Merced, California. Her father worked for Farmers Insurance Group, while her mother worked with doctors and ambulance companies in town as an answering service. Her family politics were as Democrats, but Burke would later change to the Republican party. Burke went to Our Lady of Mercy School in Merced, California. She received a B.S. in nursing from the University of San Francisco in 1973. She later earned an MPA from the Harvard Kennedy School in 1982.

== Career ==
Burke's early career was as a nurse, and she worked at Alta Bates Hospital in Berkeley, California, and served as student affairs director of the National Student Nurses Association. In 1974 she moved to become program director of New York's National Student Nurses Association, and worked at Doctors Hospital in New York as a medical-surgical nurse.

Burke connected with Senator Bob Dole through a third party. Senator Dole was looking for someone to deal with the health matters. Despite being a Democrat, and relatively liberal, Dole, caring little about her political views, hired Burke due to the fact that she had experience with patient care.

Burke started as a legislative aide to Senator Bob Dole in 1977. She came in with little to no experience working in Washington or the Senate. In 1978 she began as a staffer for the Senate Committee on Finance, and from 1982 until 1985 she served as deputy staff director for that committee. She also joined the Finance Committee in 1979; she was in charge of handling all of the issues regarding health. Burke was named Bob Dole's deputy chief of staff in 1985, and in 1986 she was promoted to become Dole's chief of staff. She was the first woman chief of staff to a Senate majority leader.

Throughout her time working with Senator Dole, Burke was extremely careful to only provide him with the information he needed to make good decisions and not try to influence him in any way that was incompatible with his Republican views. Additionally, as a staffer, Burke felt she should not be the center of attention, but in 1995 a series of articles in the Washington Post presented opposition to her work in Washington, D.C. Burke was elected secretary of the Senate in 1995. Given her role in the Senate, she was informally known as the "101st senator".

In 1996, Burke left the Senate to become executive dean of the Harvard Kennedy School. She served in this role until 2000 when she went to the Smithsonian Institution to serve as the under secretary for American museums and national programs. She held this position through 2003. From 2004 until 2007 she was the deputy secretary and chief operating officer of the Smithsonian Institution.

As of 2023, Burke works as a strategic advisor at Baker Donelson in Washington, D.C., and is an adjunct lecturer at Harvard University and Georgetown University.

== Awards and honors ==
In 2004 Burke was elected a member of the National Academy of Medicine, and a fellow of the National Academy of Public Administration. She is also a fellow of the American Academy of Nursing. In 2008 she received the David Rall Medal from the Institute of Medicine. New York University Rory Meyers College of Nursing awarded her with their Helen Manzer Award in 2016.
