= Charles G. Bennett =

American politician from New York

Charles Goodwin Bennett
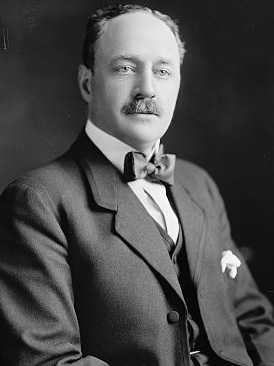

11th Secretary of the United States Senate
- In office February 1, 1900 – March 13, 1913
- Preceded by: William Ruffin Cox
- Succeeded by: James M. Baker

Member of the U.S. House of Representatives from New York's 5th district
- In office March 4, 1895 – March 3, 1899
- Preceded by: John H. Graham
- Succeeded by: Frank E. Wilson

Personal details
- Born: December 11, 1863 Brooklyn, New York, U.S.
- Died: May 25, 1914 (aged 50) Brooklyn, New York, U.S.
- Party: Republican
- Spouses: Marie Louise Floyd-Smith Bennett; Marguerite Tennan Bennett
- Education: New York Law School
- Profession: lawyer; politician

Charles Goodwin Bennett (December 11, 1863 – May 25, 1914) was an American politician and a U.S. Representative from New York.

== Biography ==
Born in Brooklyn, New York, Bennett was the son of George C. Bennett and attended the public schools. He graduated from Brooklyn High School and New York Law School in 1882. He was admitted to the bar in 1882 and commenced practice in Brooklyn. He married Marie Louise Floyd-Smith, who died in 1913. He subsequently married Marguerite Tennan in 1914.

== Career ==
Bennett was an unsuccessful candidate for election in 1892 to the Fifty-third Congress.

Elected as a Republican to the Fifty-fourth and Fifty-fifth Congresses, Bennett served as U. S. Representative for the fifth district of New York from March 4, 1895, to March 4, 1899. He was an unsuccessful candidate for reelection to the Fifty-sixth Congress in 1898.

Bennett was Secretary of the United States Senate from January 29, 1900, to March 4, 1913, when a successor was elected. He returned to Brooklyn, ended active business pursuits, and lived the rest of his life in retirement.

== Death ==
Bennett died in Brooklyn, Kings County, New York, on May 25, 1914.

U.S. House of Representatives
Preceded by John H. Graham	Member of the U.S. House of Representatives from New York's 5th congressional district March 4, 1895 – March 4, 1899	Succeeded by Frank E. Wilson
