= Edwin Pope Thayer =

American politician (1864–1943)

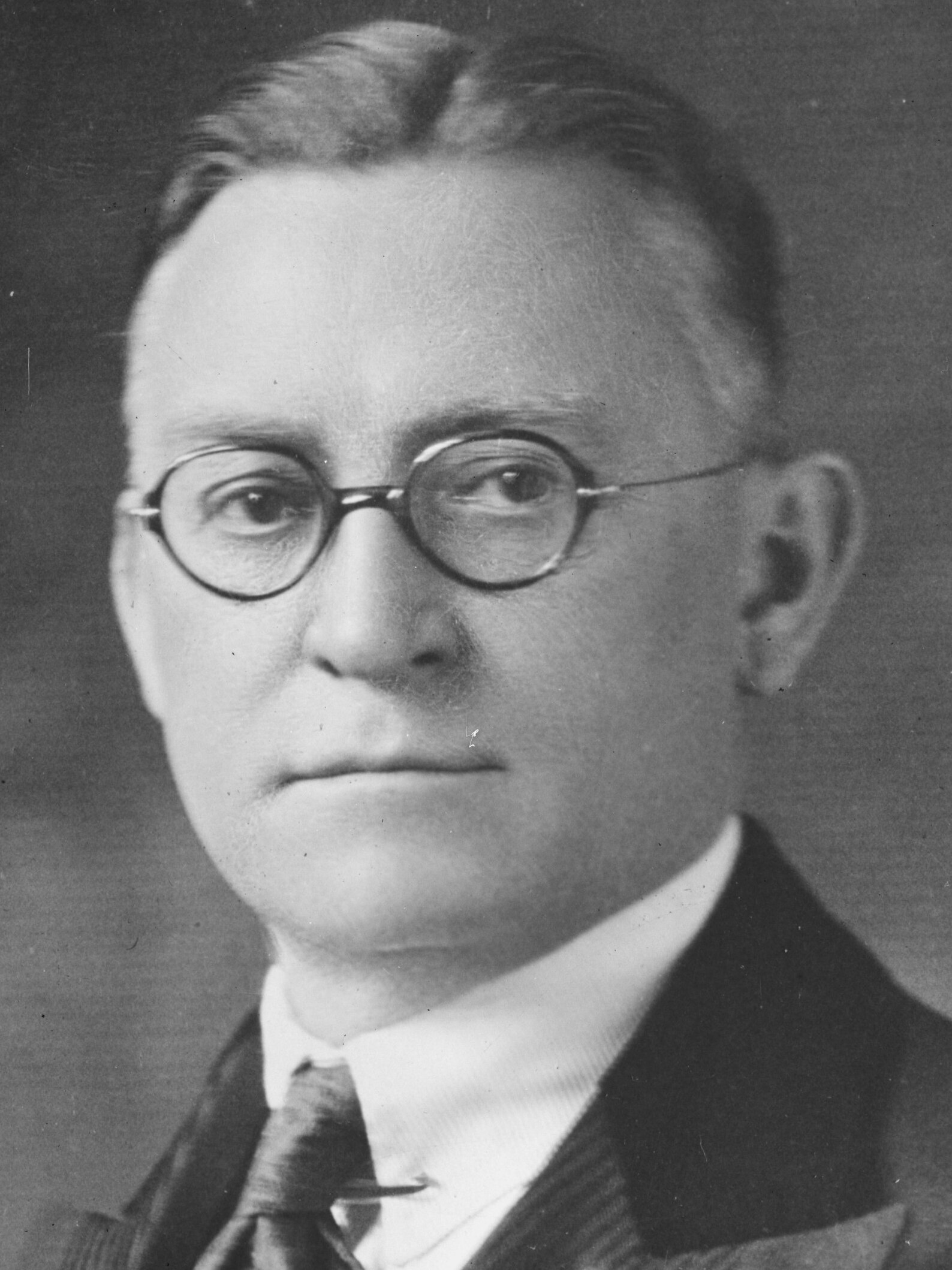

14th Secretary of the United States Senate
- In office December 7, 1925 – March 9, 1933
- Leader: Charles Curtis
- Preceded by: George A. Sanderson
- Succeeded by: Edwin A. Halsey

Personal details
- Born: December 15, 1864 Greenfield, Indiana
- Died: February 1, 1943 (aged 78) Greenfield, Indiana
- Party: Republican
- Education: DePauw University

Edwin Pope Thayer (December 15, 1864 in Greenfield, Indiana – February 1, 1943), American politician. After graduation, he went to DePauw University from which he graduated in 1886.

== Military service ==
Edwin Pope Thayer served during the Spanish–American War. He served as the regiment commander of Indiana's 158th Volunteers. After his service in the war, Thayer was a colonel in the National Guard for twelve years.

== Political career ==
After the death of the former Secretary of the Senate George Anderson, Edwin Thayer was nominated by a friend, Jim Watson. Thayer won the unanimous endorsement of the Republican Convention. On December 7, 1925, Thayer was appointed to the position of Secretary of the Senate.

=== Preservation of Old Senate Records ===
After discovering an original copy of the Monroe Doctrine Edwin Thayer became interested in the preservation of old Senate records. He enlisted the help of Harold Hufford in storing the documents. The old Senate documents that the two organized would later become some of the first legislative documents in the National Archives.

== Later life ==
In 1932 the Republican Party lost control of the Senate leading Thayer to lose his job as secretary. He retired from the Senate on March 4, 1933. Thayer later died in his hometown of Greenfield on February 1, 1943.
