= Sonceria Berry =

American political aide (born 1955)

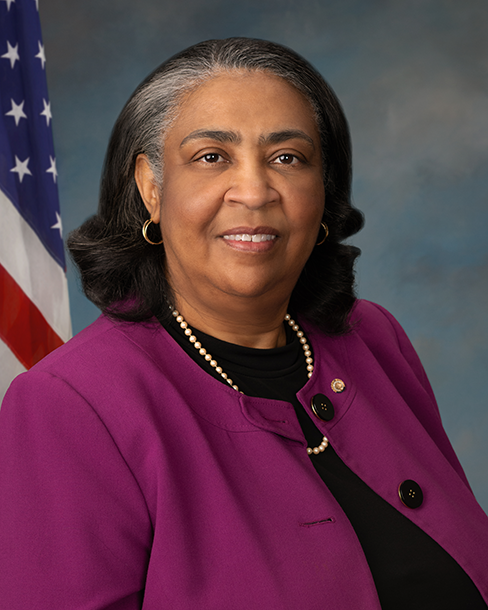
- Official portrait, 2021

34th Secretary of the United States Senate
- In office March 1, 2021 – January 3, 2025
- Leader: Chuck Schumer
- Preceded by: Julie E. Adams
- Succeeded by: Jackie Barber

Personal details
- Born: Sonceria Bishop; July 24, 1955 (age 70) Birmingham, Alabama, U.S.
- Party: Democratic
- Education: University of North Alabama (BA)

Sonceria "Ann" Bishop Berry (born July 24, 1955) is an American political aide who served as the 34th secretary of the United States Senate from 2021 to 2025.

== Early life and education ==
Berry is a native of Birmingham, Alabama and graduated from J. H. Phillips High School. She earned a Bachelor of Arts degree in education from the University of North Alabama.

== Career ==
Berry has worked as a staffer in the United States Senate for four decades, including in the offices of Tom Carper, John Edwards, Daniel Patrick Moynihan, Howell Heflin, and Doug Jones. Most recently, she was deputy chief of staff for Patrick Leahy. She is the first African-American to hold the position of Secretary of the United States Senate.

== Personal life ==
Berry and her husband, Reginald A. Berry, have one daughter, Elizabeth Berry.

Government offices
Preceded by Julie E. Adams	34th Secretary of the United States Senate; 2021–2025	Succeeded by Jackie Barber
