= Walter J. Stewart =

Secretary of the United States Senate
- In office 1987–1994
- Leader: Robert Byrd
- Preceded by: Jo-Anne Coe
- Succeeded by: Kelly D. Johnston

Personal details
- Party: Nonpartisan
- Profession: Legislative administrator

Walter J. Stewart is an American public servant who served as the 27th Secretary of the United States Senate from 1987 to 1994. Stewart was known for his expertise in Senate procedure, administrative reform, and commitment to nonpartisan service in the United States Congress.

== Career ==
Stewart began his Senate service in the 1950s and worked in a range of administrative roles, including as Assistant Secretary of the Senate. In 1987, then-Senate Majority Leader Robert Byrd nominated him as Secretary of the Senate. He was unanimously confirmed and became the 27th individual to hold the position.

During his tenure, Stewart modernized internal operations by overseeing computerization efforts, streamlining document processing, and professionalizing the Senate staff. He was instrumental in planning the 1989 congressional bicentennial celebrations. Stewart also advised on procedural matters during key moments of legislative transition and national policy debate.

His tenure spanned both Republican and Democratic majorities, and he earned bipartisan respect for his dedication to institutional integrity. He retired in 1994 after four decades of public service.
