= George A. Sanderson =

American politician

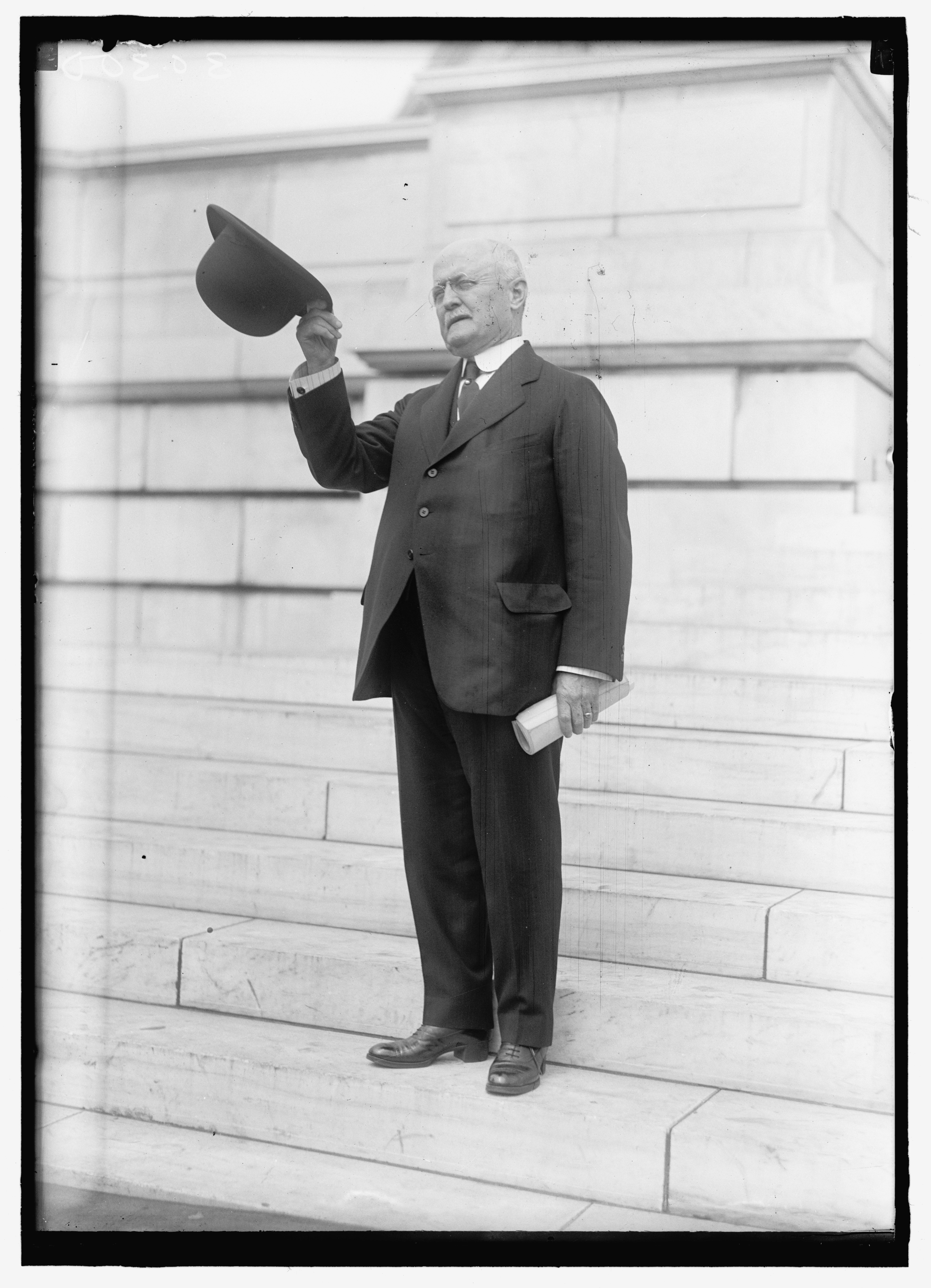

13th Secretary of the United States Senate
- In office May 19, 1919 – April 24, 1925
- Leader: Henry Cabot Lodge
- Preceded by: James Marion Baker
- Succeeded by: Edwin Pope Thayer

Personal details
- Born: February 22, 1850 Hamilton, Ohio, US
- Died: April 24, 1925 (aged 75)
- Resting place: Arlington National Cemetery
- Education: United States Naval Academy

George Andrew Sanderson was an American politician who served as the 13th secretary of the United States Senate from 1919 to his death in 1925.

== Biography ==
Sanderson was born on February 22, 1850, in Hamilton, Ohio. He graduated from the United States Naval Academy in 1871. He resigned from his naval commission after two years to enter the British Merchant Navy. He resigned from being a member of the British Merchant Navy after two years.

Sanderson became wealthy as a railroad builder. In 1892, he entered the railroad business at Chicago's Union Stock Yards. He worked at the Stock Yards for 10 years, until he left Chicago, and moved to Mexico. In 1904, Sanderson became the president of the Sonora railroad construction company. In 1919, Sanderson moved back to the United States and became 13th secretary of the United States Senate in May 1919.

Sanderson died of a Heart Attack on April 24, 1925, while he was still serving as secretary. He was buried at Arlington National Cemetery.
