= Julie E. Adams =

American government official (born 1977)

Julie Adams
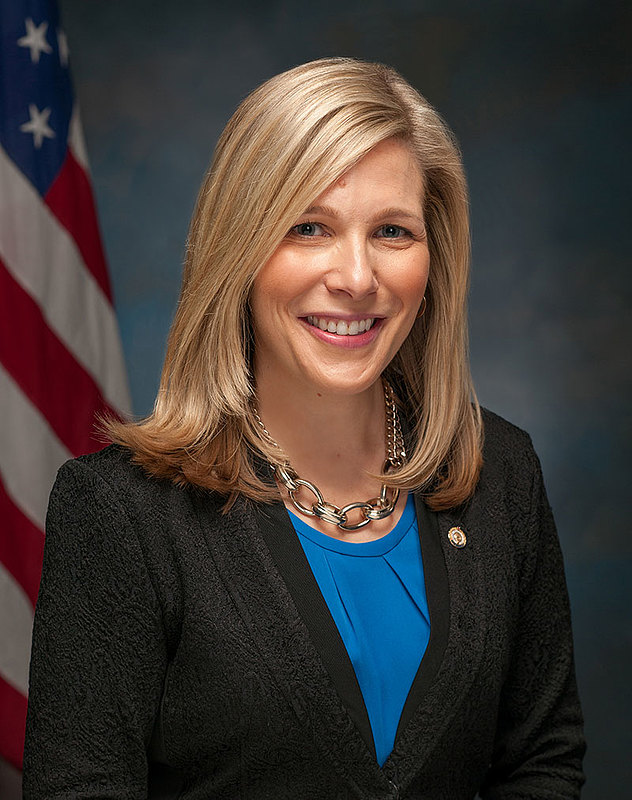

33rd Secretary of the United States Senate
- In office January 6, 2015 – March 1, 2021
- Leader: Mitch McConnell
- Preceded by: Nancy Erickson
- Succeeded by: Sonceria Berry

Personal details
- Born: February 24, 1977 (age 48) Iowa City, Iowa, U.S.
- Party: Republican
- Education: Luther College (BA); University of Iowa (MA)

Julie E. Adams (born February 24, 1977) is an American government official and former political advisor who served as the 33rd secretary of the United States Senate from 2015 to 2021.

== Early life and education ==
Adams is a native of Iowa City, Iowa. She received a Bachelor of Arts degree in political science from Luther College in 1999 and a Master of Arts in education from the University of Iowa in 2002. As an undergraduate, Adams participated a Luther College semester-long internship program in Washington, D.C., during which she interned with the Children's Defense Fund.

== Career ==
After graduating from college, Adams took a break from working toward obtaining a teaching certificate to help run Iowa Rep. James Leach's congressional campaign.

Following Leach's re-election, Adams went to Washington, D.C., where she served for 17 months as an aide to First Lady Laura Bush, before joining the staff of then-Senate Majority Whip, Mitch McConnell, as deputy communications director in 2003.

From September 2007 to January 2009, Adams worked in the East Wing of the White House Office as a spokesperson for First Lady Laura Bush. Adams then served six years as director of administration and member relations for then-Senate Minority Leader McConnell.

Adams began her term as the 33rd secretary of the Senate on January 6, 2015, during the 114th Congress. She is the seventh woman to hold the position.

She left the position on March 1, 2021.

Government offices
Preceded by Nancy Erickson	33rd Secretary of the United States Senate; 2015–2021	Succeeded by Sonceria Berry
