= Joseph Mark Trice =

American Senate official (1902–1987)

J. Mark Trice
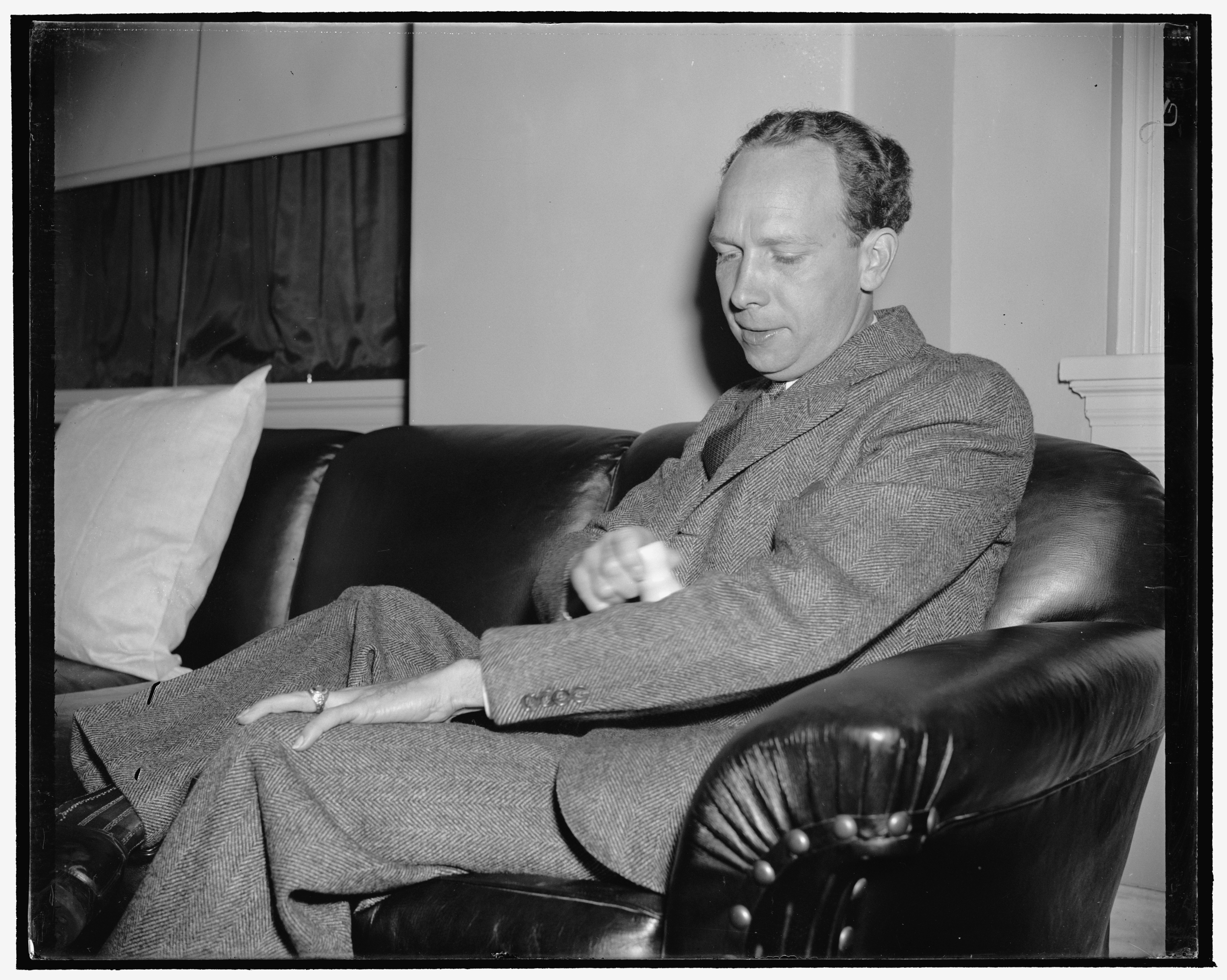

18th Secretary of the United States Senate
- In office January 3, 1953 – January 5, 1955
- Preceded by: Leslie Biffle
- Succeeded by: Felton M. Johnston

Personal details
- Born: Joseph Mark Trice; October 22, 1902 Washington, D.C., U.S.
- Died: July 3, 1987 (aged 84)
- Party: Republican
- Education: Georgetown University Law Center

Joseph Mark Trice (October 22, 1902 – July 3, 1987) was an American lawyer and United States Senate official who served as the 18th Secretary of the United States Senate from 1953 to 1955. He first came to the Senate as a page in 1916 and retired as Republican party secretary in December 1973.

== Early life ==
Trice was born in Washington, D.C., attended local schools, and was appointed a Senate page in 1916. He served until 1919 and then became secretary to the Senate sergeant at arms, studying at night at the Emerson Institute and at the Georgetown University School of Law, where he earned his law degree in 1928.

== Сareer ==
After briefly practicing law, Trice returned to the Senate in 1932 as deputy sergeant at arms. When David S. Barry was dismissed in early 1933 he served briefly as acting sergeant at arms and helped organize Franklin D. Roosevelt's first inauguration; he later directed Capitol Hill arrangements for the Eisenhower and Nixon inaugurations.

In November 1942 Trice was sent to the Mayflower Hotel under a Senate arrest order to bring Senator Kenneth McKellar of Tennessee to the Capitol for a quorum vote called to break a southern filibuster. Senate press aide Richard L. Riedel recounted the episode in his 1969 memoir Halls of the Mighty.

After the 1946 elections returned the Senate to Republican control, Trice succeeded Carl Loeffler as Republican party secretary. He was elected Secretary of the Senate when the Republicans took the majority in the 83rd Congress, taking office on January 3, 1953. Senator Barry Goldwater, a freshman that month, recalled in his memoirs that Trice "came to me like a life ring comes to a drowning man" during his first days in Washington.

When the Democrats regained the majority after the 1954 elections, Trice's term as Secretary ended on January 5, 1955, and he returned to the Republican party secretaryship until his retirement in December 1973. In 1975 he was appointed to the Commission on the Operation of the Senate. He turned down an invitation to take part in the Senate Historical Office's oral history program, a refusal the office regards as a notable gap in the documentary record of the twentieth-century Senate.

Political offices
| Preceded by Leslie Biffle | Secretary of the United States Senate; 1953–1955 | Succeeded by Felton M. Johnston |
