= Kelly D. Johnston =

Secretary of the United States Senate

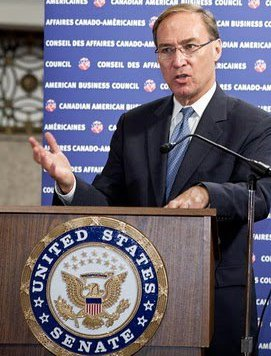

28th Secretary of the United States Senate
- In office June 8, 1995 – September 30, 1996
- Leader: Bob Dole
- Preceded by: Sheila P. Burke
- Succeeded by: Gary Lee Sisco

Personal details
- Born: August 27, 1956 (age 70) Edmond, Oklahoma
- Education: University of Science and Arts of Oklahoma

Kelly D. Johnston (born August 27, 1956) is a former Secretary of the United States Senate. He served as the 28th Secretary of the Senate and was nominated by Bob Dole, who was Senate Majority Leader at the time. He was the first Secretary of the Senate from Oklahoma and the second youngest ever chosen.

Until 2018, Johnston was Vice President of Government Affairs for the Campbell's. Johnston was also a member of the board of Congressional Management Foundation.

== Early life ==
Born in Edmond, Oklahoma in 1956, Johnston graduated from the University of Science and Arts of Oklahoma in 1976 with a bachelor's in Communications and Drama, where he also served as President of the Student Association and as Editor of the Trend, the student newspaper. Before beginning his career in Washington, DC, he was a newspaper reporter for the Bartlesville, Oklahoma Examiner-Enterprise, and served briefly as Managing Editor of the Henryetta, Oklahoma Free-Lance, where under his leadership, the newspaper won four awards for photography and journalism from the Oklahoma Press Association.

Before his nomination as Secretary, he served as Executive Director of the US Senate Republican Policy Committee, part of the US Senate Republican leadership, then chaired by US Senator Don Nickles. Prior to that, he was Deputy Assistant Secretary for Public Affairs at the US Department of Transportation under Secretaries Samuel Skinner and Andrew Card during the Administration of President George H. W. Bush.

During the 1990 elections, he was a regional political director at the National Republican Senatorial Committee (NRSC), where he worked on the reelection campaigns of several incumbent Republican Senators. Before joining the NRSC, Johnston was chief of staff to then-US Representative Jon Kyl, Communications Director to US Representative John Hiler, and a staff assistant to US Representative John Paul Hammerschmidt. He also served as a Regional Political Director at the National Republican Congressional Committee during the 1984 and 1986 congressional elections. He has worked in some capacity in 35 US Senate or House campaigns in 25 states.

== Secretary of the Senate ==
Johnston served as Secretary of the United States Senate from June 8, 1995, until September 30, 1996. During his tenure, he advocated for the creation of the Capitol Visitor Center and implemented two reform laws, the Lobby Disclosure Act and Congressional Accountability Act.

== Later career ==
In December 1996 President Bill Clinton nominated Johnston to serve on the Federal Election Commission, but the United States Senate, led by a Republican majority, failed to take up the nomination for a confirmation vote.

From 1996 to 2002, Johnston served as Executive Vice President for Government Affairs and Communications for the National Food Processors Association. On October 26, 2018, he retired from his position as Vice President of Government Affairs for the Campbell's of Camden, New Jersey.

In 2009, Johnston became Chairman of the Canadian-American Business Council.

Johnston retired from Campbell Soup Company in October 2018.

Government offices
Preceded by Sheila P. Burke	28th Secretary of the United States Senate; 1995 – 1996	Succeeded by Gary Lee Sisco
