= Assistant Secretary of the United States Senate =

Assistant Secretary of United States Senate
- Incumbent; Jody Wright since February 25, 2025
- United States Senate
- Precursor: Principal Clerk of the United States Senate

The assistant secretary of the United States Senate represents the position of Secretary of the United States Senate within the United States Senate during the absence of the secretary.

The secretary of the United States Senate was authorized to hire one principal clerk in 1789. This principal clerk, or chief clerk, for many years served primarily as a reading clerk on the Senate floor. During the 1960s, in response to the secretary's growing administrative duties, principal clerk or clerk became Assistant Secretary of the Senate. The assistant secretary oversees the administration of the 26 departments within the Office of the Secretary. and performs the functions of the secretary in his or her absence.

The assistant secretary performs all duties of the secretary of the Senate as well as that of the acting president pro tempore if absent and as outlined in Standing Rules of the United States Senate, Rule I.

According to the Library of Congress, the Law Library of Congress and the Office of the Secretary of the United States Senate, the current incumbent assistant secretary of the United States Senate since February 25, 2025, in the 119th United States Congress is Jody Wright who succeeded Robert Paxton who served as Assistant Secretary of the United States Senate from 2023 to 2025 in the 118th United States Congress. Robert Paxton succeeded Mary Suit Jones who served as Assistant Secretary of the United States Senate from 2021 to 2022 in the 117th United States Congress.

== Assistant secretaries of the Senate ==
No.	Portrait	Assistant Secretary of the Senate	State or territory	Term of service	Congress	Notes
		Mary Suit Jones		2021–2022	117th	
		Robert Paxton		2023–2025	118th – 119th	
		Jody Wright		February 25, 2025 – present	119th	
