= James Marion Baker =

American political figure

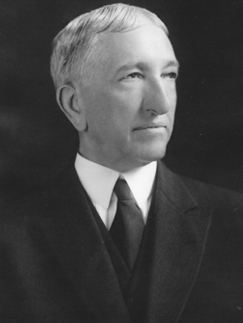

United States Ambassador to Thailand
- In office December 9, 1933 – May 2, 1936
- Appointed by: Franklin D. Roosevelt
- Preceded by: David E. Kaufman
- Succeeded by: Edwin L. Neville

12th Secretary of the United States Senate
- In office March 13, 1913 – May 19, 1919
- Preceded by: Charles G. Bennett
- Succeeded by: George A. Sanderson

Personal details
- Born: August 18, 1861; South Carolina, United States
- Died: November 21, 1940 (aged 79)
- Political party: Democratic

James Marion Baker (August 18, 1861 – November 21, 1940) was an American political figure, who held the position of Secretary of the United States Senate from 1913 to 1919.

== Life and career ==
Baker was born in South Carolina, and came to serve as the assistant librarian of the United States Senate. In 1913, Baker was elected by the new, Democratic senate, as the eleventh secretary of the Senate after serving twenty years as assistant librarian.

At the retaking of the Senate by the Republican Party in 1919, Baker was replaced by George A. Sanderson, and President Woodrow Wilson appointed Baker deputy commissioner of internal revenue.

Baker left the government when Woodrow Wilson left the White House, and established a law firm.

In 1931, Baker retired to assist with Franklin D. Roosevelt's presidential campaign. Baker later became a minister to Thailand in the Roosevelt administration, until retiring due to poor health in 1937.
