= Secretary of the United States Senate =

Officer of the United States Senate

Secretary of United States Senate
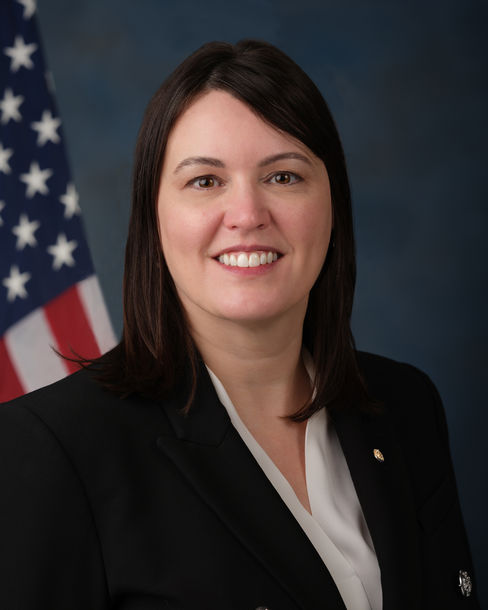
- Incumbent; Jackie Barber since January 3, 2025
- United States Senate
- Seat: Senate chamber, United States Capitol, Washington, D.C.
- Nominator: Senate Majority Leader
- Appointer: Elected by the Senate
- Formation: April 8, 1789
- First holder: Samuel Allyne Otis
- Deputy: Assistant Secretary of the United States Senate
- Salary: US$172,500 per year
- Website: www.senate.gov

The secretary of the United States Senate is an officer of the United States Senate. The secretary supervises an extensive array of offices and services to expedite the day-to-day operations of that body. The office is somewhat analogous to that of the clerk of the United States House of Representatives.

The first secretary was chosen on April 8, 1789, two days after the Senate achieved its first quorum for business at the beginning of the 1st United States Congress. From the start, the secretary was responsible for keeping the minutes and records of the Senate, including the records of senators' election, and for receiving and transmitting official messages to and from the president and the House of Representatives, as well as for purchasing supplies. As the Senate grew to become a major national institution, numerous other duties were assigned to the secretary, whose jurisdiction now encompasses clerks, curators, and computers; disbursement of payrolls; acquisition of stationery supplies; education of the Senate pages; and the maintenance of public records. Today, the secretary coordinates two of the largest technology initiatives in Senate history, both designed to bring state-of-the-art efficiency to management of legislative and financial information. The secretary's responsibilities include both legislative and administrative functions.

By agreement of the two parties, the majority leader selects the secretary of the senate, and the election is merely ceremonial. The Senate Officers Clause of Article I, Section III states "The Senate shall chuse their other Officers". The Oath or Affirmation Clause of Article VI provides that "all ... Officers ... of the United States ... shall be bound by Oath or Affirmation, to support this Constitution", and pursuant to Article VI, the 1st United States Congress passed the Oath Administration Act (that remains in effect) which provides that "the [S]ecretary of the Senate... shall... [take] the oath or affirmation [required by the sixth article of the Constitution of the United States]".

The current secretary (for the 119th United States Congress) is Jackie Barber.

== Legislative functions ==
The secretary regularly accompanies the chaplain into the Senate chamber for the opening of the day's session and a seat beside the presiding officer is reserved for the secretary. The secretary examines and signs every act that has been passed by the Senate. In certain parliamentary circumstances, the secretary may also preside over the Senate. The most recent occurrence was on June 28, 2010, after Senator Robert Byrd of West Virginia, who had been serving as President Pro Tempore died, and Vice President Joseph Biden was absent. On that occasion, Secretary of the Senate Nancy Erickson took the chair briefly until the Senate adopted a resolution to elect Senator Daniel Inouye of Hawaii as the new president pro tempore.

The first secretary took the minutes of Senate proceedings, a function continued today by the journal clerk. After the Congressional Record evolved into an official publication, the secretary came to supervise the Senate's reporters of debates and preparation of the Daily Digest. Among other Senate floor staff who report to the secretary are the parliamentarian, bill clerk, and legislative clerk.

== Administrative functions ==
The first secretary purchased the quill pens, ink, and parchment needed by eighteenth-century senators. Modern secretaries of the Senate have responsibility for the Senate Stationery Room, a multimillion-dollar retail operation that keeps senators' offices supplied. From the beginning, the secretary served as the Senate's disbursing officer, paying senators their original salary of six dollars a day plus travel expenses. As the Senate grew, a separate financial clerk was appointed under the secretary's jurisdiction.

In recognition of the immediate and historical significance of Senate bills, resolutions, hearings, and reports, the secretary oversees the Office of Printing and Document Services, the Office of Senate Security (which maintains classified documents), the United States Senate Library, the Office of Senate Curator, and the Senate Historical Office. The secretary also maintains the Office of Interparliamentary Services to provide support for those interparliamentary conferences in which the Senate participates and to assist senators in international travel. Also under the secretary's direction, the Office of Public Records collects and makes publicly available documents relating to campaign finance, financial ethics, foreign travel, and lobbying.

In 1789 the secretary was authorized to hire "one principal clerk." This principal clerk, or chief clerk, for many years served primarily as a reading clerk on the Senate floor. But during the 1960s, in response to the secretary's growing administrative duties, the position evolved into that of assistant secretary of the Senate, who oversees the administration of the Secretary's Office, including computers and the secretary's web site. The assistant secretary also performs the functions of the secretary in his or her absence. During the 1960s, under the leadership of Francis R. Valeo, staff positions under the secretary of the Senate were redefined from patronage to professional status, a trend continued by Valeo's successors.

== Notable secretaries ==
Samuel Allyne Otis, the first secretary of the Senate, had previously been speaker of the Massachusetts legislature and a member of the Continental Congress. Otis was secretary for twenty-five years. General Anson McCook of New York, a former House member and one of the "Fighting McCooks" of the Civil War, served as secretary, as well as a former Confederate general and Congressman, William R. Cox of North Carolina. In addition, two former U.S. senators, Charles Cutts of New Hampshire and Walter Lowrie of Pennsylvania, have later served as secretary. Other former House members who have held the post include Charles G. Bennett (NY). During the Ninety-ninth Congress (1985–1987), Jo-Anne Coe became the first woman to serve as secretary.

It has not been unusual for secretaries of the Senate to have devoted their entire careers to the Senate. Several began as pages, including Edwin Halsey, who served throughout the dramatic New Deal years; Leslie Biffle, a close confidant of President Harry S. Truman; Carl Loeffler and J. Mark Trice, secretaries during the Eightieth and Eighty-third congresses; and Walter J. Stewart, secretary from 1987 to 1994.

== Secretaries of the Senate ==
The following persons served as Secretary of the Senate:

No.	Portrait	Secretary of the Senate	State or territory	Term start	Term end	Congress	Refs.
1		Samuel Allyne Otis	Massachusetts	April 8, 1789	April 22, 1814 (Note: Died in office)	1st – 13th	
–		Samuel Turner Jr. (Note: Also the Chief Clerk of the Senate) Acting		September 19, 1814	October 11, 1814	13th	
2		Charles Cutts	New Hampshire	October 12, 1814	December 12, 1825	13th – 19th	
3		Walter Lowrie	Pennsylvania	December 12, 1825	December 5, 1836	19th – 24th	
4		Asbury Dickins (Note: retired at age 80 before end of term)	North Carolina	December 13, 1836	July 15, 1861	24th – 37th	
5		John Weiss Forney	Pennsylvania	July 15, 1861	June 4, 1868	37th – 40th	
6		George C. Gorham	California	June 6, 1868	March 24, 1879	40th – 46th	
7		John C. Burch	Tennessee	March 24, 1879	July 28, 1881	46th – 47th	
–		Francis E. Shober Acting	North Carolina	October 24, 1881	December 18, 1883	47th – 48th	
8		Anson G. McCook	New York	December 18, 1883	August 7, 1893	48th – 53rd	
9		William Ruffin Cox	North Carolina	August 7, 1893	January 31, 1900	53rd – 56th	
10		Charles G. Bennett	New York	February 1, 1900	March 13, 1913	56th – 63rd	
11		James M. Baker	South Carolina	March 13, 1913	May 19, 1919	63rd – 66th	
12		George A. Sanderson	Illinois	May 19, 1919	April 24, 1925	66th – 69th	
13		Edwin Pope Thayer	Indiana	December 7, 1925	March 9, 1933	69th – 73rd	
14		Edwin A. Halsey	Virginia	March 9, 1933	January 29, 1945	73rd – 79th	
15		Leslie Biffle	Arkansas	February 8, 1945	January 4, 1947	79th – 80th	
16		Carl A. Loeffler	Pennsylvania	January 4, 1947	January 3, 1949	80th	
17		Leslie Biffle	Arkansas	January 3, 1949	January 3, 1953	81st – 82nd	
18		J. Mark Trice	Maryland	January 3, 1953	January 5, 1955	83rd – 84th	
19		Felton M. Johnston	Mississippi	January 5, 1955	December 30, 1965	84th – 89th	
20		Emery L. Frazier (Note: retired at age 70)	Kentucky	January 1, 1966	September 30, 1966	89th	
21		Francis R. Valeo	Washington, D.C.	October 1, 1966	March 31, 1977	89th – 95th	
22		J. Stanley Kimmitt	Virginia	April 1, 1977	January 4, 1981	95th – 97th	
23		William F. Hildenbrand	Washington, D.C.	January 5, 1981	January 2, 1985	97th – 98th	
24		Jo–Anne L. Coe	Virginia	January 3, 1985	January 6, 1987	99th – 100th	
25		Walter J. Stewart	Washington, D.C.	January 6, 1987	April 15, 1994	100th – 103rd	
26		Martha S. Pope	Connecticut	April 15, 1994	January 3, 1995	103rd	
27		Sheila P. Burke	California	January 4, 1995	June 7, 1995	104th	
28		Kelly D. Johnston	Oklahoma	June 8, 1995	September 30, 1996	104th	
29		Gary Lee Sisco	Tennessee	October 1, 1996	July 11, 2001	104th – 107th	
30		Jeri Thomson	Virginia	July 12, 2001	January 6, 2003	107th – 108th	
31		Emily J. Reynolds	Tennessee	January 7, 2003	January 3, 2007	108th – 109th	
32		Nancy Erickson	South Dakota	January 4, 2007	January 5, 2015	110th – 114th	
33		Julie E. Adams	Iowa	January 6, 2015	March 1, 2021	114th – 117th	
34		Sonceria "Ann" Berry	Alabama	March 1, 2021	January 3, 2025	117th – 118th	
35		Jackie Barber	South Dakota	January 3, 2025	present	119th	

Table notes:

== See also ==
- Clerk of the Parliaments
- Clerk of the Senate (Canada)
- Clerk of the Australian Senate
- Secretary General of the Rajya Sabha (India)
