= 89th United States Congress =

1965–1967 U.S. Congress

←	88th	90th	→
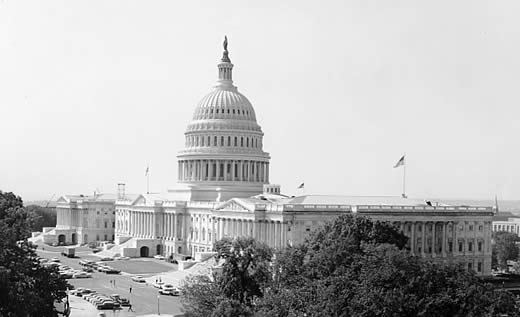
- United States Capitol (1962)

Overview
- Legislative body: United States Congress
- Jurisdiction: United States
- Term: January 3, 1965 – January 3, 1967

Senate
- Members: 100
- President: Vacant (until January 20, 1965); Hubert Humphrey (D) (from January 20, 1965)
- President pro tempore: Carl Hayden (D)
- Party control: Democratic

House of Representatives
- Members: 435
- Speaker: John W. McCormack (D)
- Party control: Democratic

Sessions
- 1st: January 4, 1965 – October 23, 1965
- 2nd: January 10, 1966 – October 22, 1966

The 89th United States Congress was a meeting of the legislative branch of the United States federal government, composed of the United States Senate and the United States House of Representatives. It met in Washington, D.C., from January 3, 1965, to January 3, 1967, during the second and third years of Lyndon B. Johnson's presidency. The apportionment of seats in the House of Representatives was based on the 1960 United States census.

Both chambers had a Democratic supermajority, and with the election of President Lyndon B. Johnson to his own term in office, maintaining an overall federal government trifecta. This is the last time Democrats or any party had a 2/3rd supermajority in the Senate.

The 89th Congress is regarded as "arguably the most productive in American history". Some of its landmark legislation includes Social Security Amendments of 1965 (the creation of Medicare and Medicaid), the Voting Rights Act, the Higher Education Act, the Immigration and Nationality Act of 1965, the Elementary and Secondary Education Act, and the Freedom of Information Act.

== Major events ==
- January 4, 1965: President Johnson proclaimed his "Great Society" during his State of the Union Address.
- January 20, 1965: Inauguration of President Lyndon B. Johnson for a full term.
- November 8, 1966: United States elections, 1966, including:
  - United States Senate elections, 1966
  - United States House of Representatives elections, 1966

== Major legislation ==
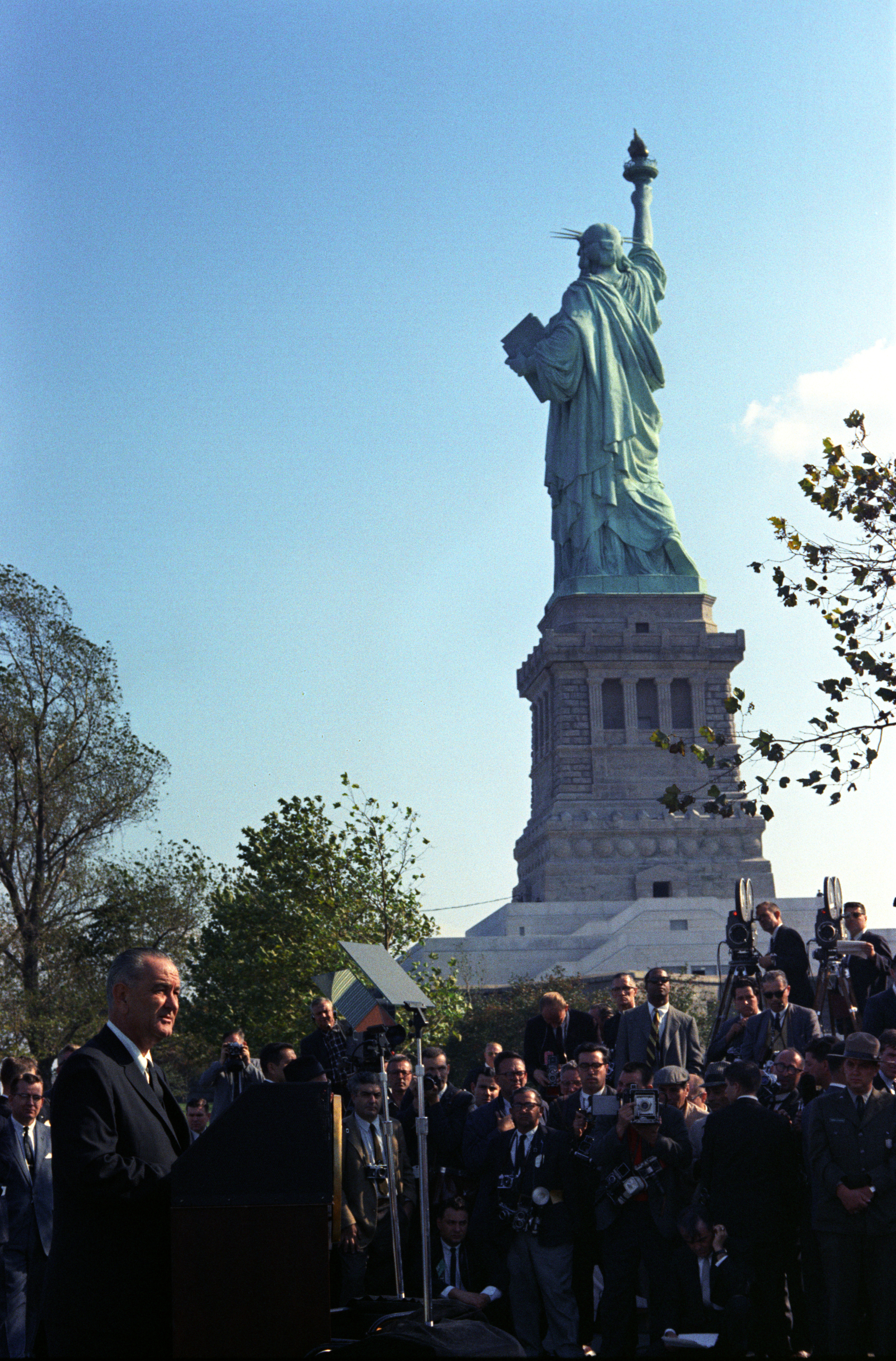
October 3, 1965: President Johnson visited the Statue of Liberty to sign the Immigration and Nationality Act of 1965.

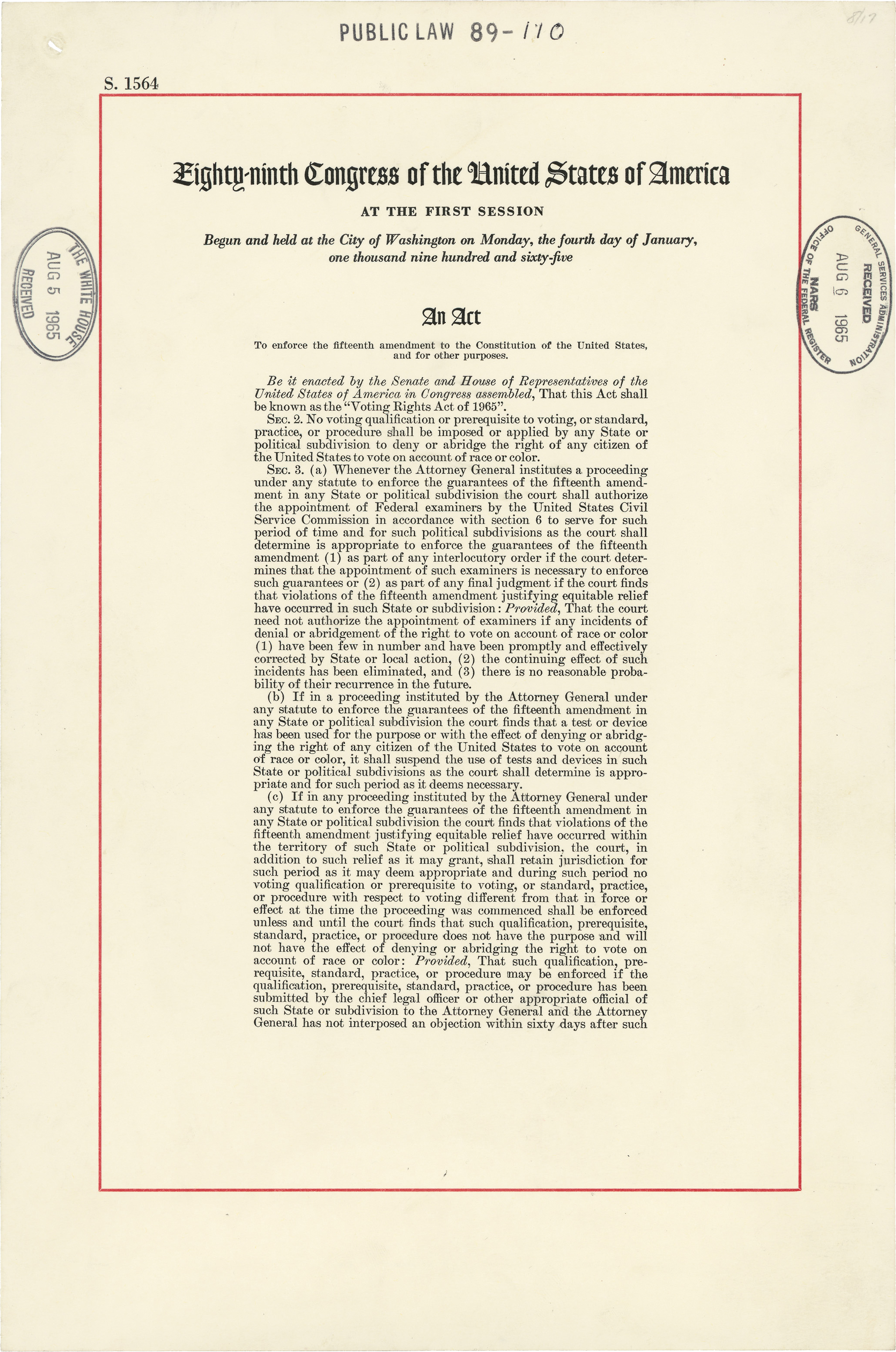
The first page of the Voting Rights Act.

- April 11, 1965: Elementary and Secondary Education Act, Pub. L. 89–10
- July 27, 1965: Federal Cigarette Labeling and Advertising Act, Pub. L. 89–92
- July 30, 1965: Social Security Act of 1965, Pub. L. 89–97 (including Medicaid and Medicare)
- August 6, 1965: Voting Rights Act, Pub. L. 89–110
- August 10, 1965: Housing and Urban Development Act of 1965, Pub. L. 89–117
- August 26, 1965: Public Works and Economic Development Act of 1965, Pub. L. 89–136
- September 9, 1965 Department of Housing and Urban Development Act, Pub. L. 89–174, 79 Stat. 667
- September 29, 1965: National Foundation on the Arts and the Humanities Act, Pub. L. 89–209
- October 3, 1965: Immigration and Nationality Act of 1965, (Hart-Celler Act, INS Act) Pub. L. 89–236
- October 6, 1965: Heart Disease, Cancer, and Stroke Amendments, Pub. L. 89–239
- October 20, 1965: Motor Vehicle Air Pollution Control Act, Pub. L. 89–272 (including Solid Waste Disposal Act)
- October 22, 1965: Highway Beautification Act, Pub. L. 89–285
- November 8, 1965: Higher Education Act, Pub. L. 89–329
- November 8, 1965: Vocational Rehabilitation Act Amendments Pub. L. 89–333
- August 26, 1966: Laboratory Animal Welfare Act Now called the Animal Welfare Act Pub. L. 89–544
- April 13, 1966: Uniform Time Act, Pub. L. 89–387
- July 13, 1966: Cotton Research and Promotion Act, Pub. L. 89–502
- September 6, 1966: Pub. L. 89–554, which (among other things) enacted what is now called the Freedom of Information Act
- September 9, 1966: National Traffic and Motor Vehicle Safety Act, Pub. L. 89–563
- September 9, 1966: Highway Safety Act, Pub. L. 89–564
- October 15, 1966: National Historic Preservation Act, Pub. L. 89–665
- October 15, 1966: National Wildlife Refuge System Administration Act of 1966, Pub. L. 89–669
- October 15, 1966: Department of Transportation Act, Pub. L. 89–670
- November 2, 1966: Cuban Adjustment Act, Pub. L. 89–732
- November 3, 1966: Comprehensive Health, Planning and Service Act, Pub. L. 89–749

== Constitutional amendments ==
- July 6, 1965: Approved an amendment to the United States Constitution addressing succession to the presidency and establishing procedures both for filling a vacancy in the office of the vice president, and for responding to presidential disabilities, and submitted it to the state legislatures for ratification
  - Amendment was later ratified on February 10, 1967, becoming the Twenty-fifth Amendment to the United States Constitution

== Party summary ==
The count below identifies party affiliations at the beginning of the first session of this Congress, and includes members from vacancies and newly admitted states, when they were first seated. Changes resulting from subsequent replacements are shown below in the "Changes in membership" section.

=== Senate ===
	Party (shading shows control)		Total	Vacant
	Democratic (D)	Republican (R)	Total	Vacant
End of previous congress	66	34	100	0
Begin	68	32	100	0
End	66	33	99	1
Final voting share	66.7%	33.3%		
Beginning of next congress	64	35	99	1

=== House of Representatives ===
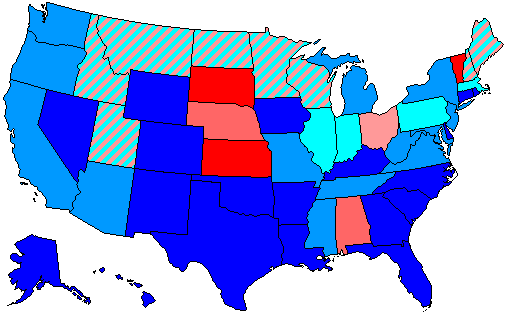
House seats by party holding plurality in state: 80+% Democratic / 80+% Republican; 60+% to 80% Democratic / 60+% to 80% Republican; Up to 60% Democratic / Up to 60% Republican

	Party (shading shows control)		Total	Vacant
	Democratic (D)	Republican (R)	Total	Vacant
End of previous congress	253	177	430	5
Begin	295	140	435	0
End	288	137	425	10
Final voting share	67.8%	32.2%		
Beginning of next congress	248	187	435	0

== Leadership ==
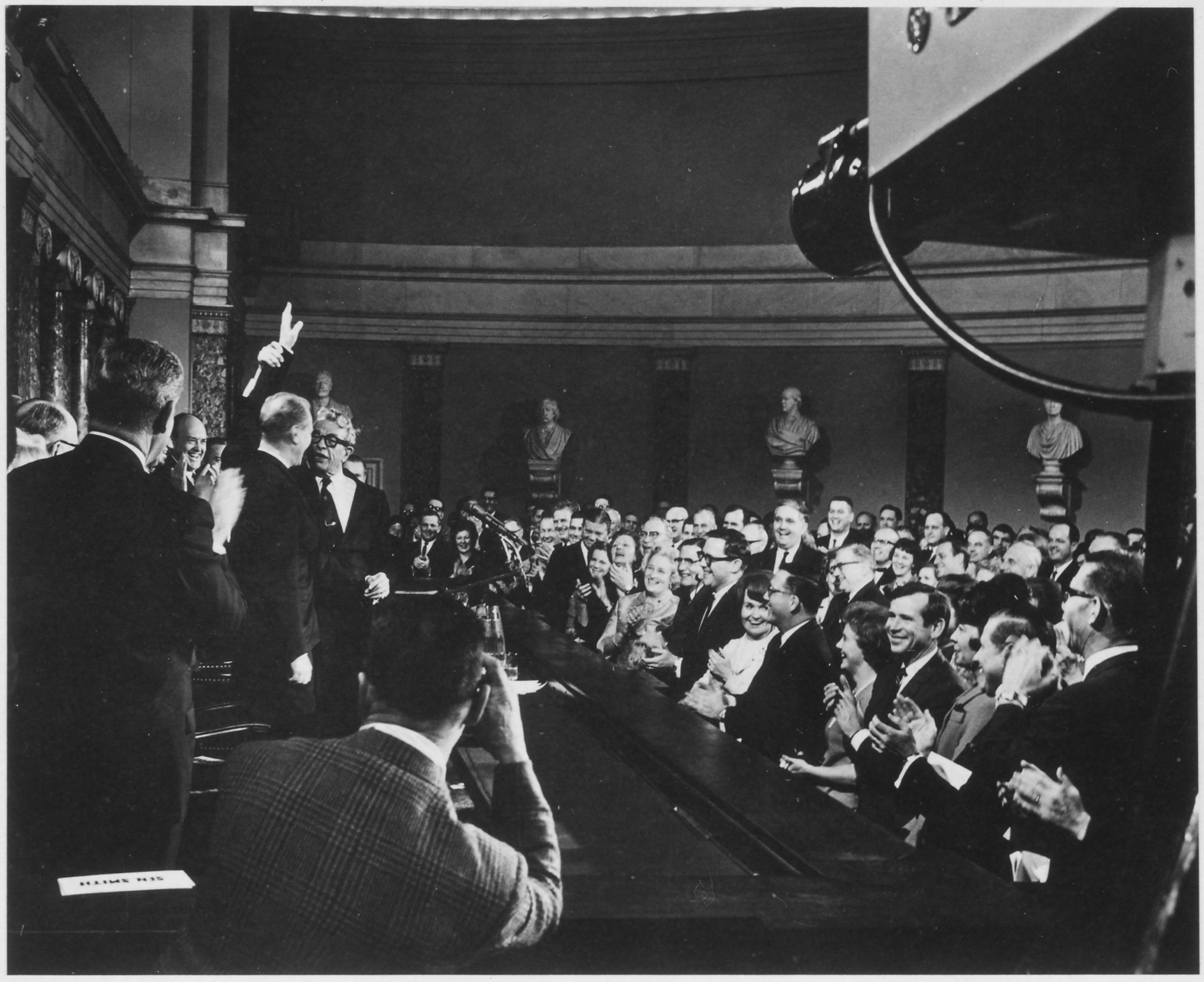
House Republicans showing their approval for newly elected House Minority Leader Representative Gerald R. Ford as Senate Minority Leader Everett M. Dirksen raises his hand.

=== Senate ===
- President: Hubert Humphrey (D), starting January 20, 1965
- President pro tempore: Carl Hayden (D)
- Permanent Acting President pro tempore: Lee Metcalf (D)

==== Majority (Democratic) leadership ====
- Majority Leader and Democratic Conference Chairman: Mike Mansfield
- Majority Whip: Russell B. Long
- Caucus Secretary: George Smathers

==== Minority (Republican) leadership ====
- Minority Leader: Everett Dirksen
- Minority Whip: Thomas Kuchel
- Republican Conference Chairman: Leverett Saltonstall
- Republican Conference Secretary: Milton Young
- National Senatorial Committee Chair: Thruston Ballard Morton
- Policy Committee Chairman: Bourke B. Hickenlooper

=== House of Representatives ===
- Speaker: John W. McCormack (D)

==== Majority (Democratic) leadership ====
- Majority Leader: Carl Albert
- Majority Whip: Hale Boggs
- Democratic Caucus Chairman: Eugene James Keogh
- Democratic Caucus Secretary: Leonor Sullivan
- Democratic Campaign Committee Chairman: Michael J. Kirwan

==== Minority (Republican) leadership ====
- Minority Leader: Gerald Ford
- Minority Whip: Leslie C. Arends
- Republican Conference Chairman: Melvin Laird
- Policy Committee Chairman: John Jacob Rhodes
- Republican Campaign Committee Chairman: Bob Wilson

== Caucuses ==
- House Democratic Caucus
- Senate Democratic Caucus

== Members ==
This list is arranged by chamber, then by state. Senators are listed in order of seniority, and representatives are listed by district.

=== Senate ===
Senators are popularly elected statewide every two years, with one-third beginning new six-year terms with each Congress. Preceding the names in the list below are Senate class numbers, which indicate the cycle of their election. In this Congress, Class 1 meant their term began in this Congress, requiring reelection in 1970; Class 2 meant their term ended with this Congress, requiring reelection in 1966; and Class 3 meant their term began in the last Congress, requiring reelection in 1968.

==== Alabama ====
▌2. John J. Sparkman (D)
▌3. J. Lister Hill (D)

==== Alaska ====
▌2. Bob Bartlett (D)
▌3. Ernest Gruening (D)

==== Arizona ====
▌1. Paul Fannin (R)
▌3. Carl Hayden (D)

==== Arkansas ====
▌2. John L. McClellan (D)
▌3. J. William Fulbright (D)

==== California ====
▌1. George Murphy (R)
▌3. Thomas Kuchel (R)

==== Colorado ====
▌2. Gordon Allott (R)
▌3. Peter H. Dominick (R)

==== Connecticut ====
▌1. Thomas J. Dodd (D)
▌3. Abraham Ribicoff (D)

==== Delaware ====
▌1. John J. Williams (R)
▌2. J. Caleb Boggs (R)

==== Florida ====
▌1. Spessard Holland (D)
▌3. George Smathers (D)

==== Georgia ====
▌2. Richard Russell Jr. (D)
▌3. Herman Talmadge (D)

==== Hawaii ====
▌1. Hiram Fong (R)
▌3. Daniel Inouye (D)

==== Idaho ====
▌2. Len Jordan (R)
▌3. Frank Church (D)

==== Illinois ====
▌2. Paul Douglas (D)
▌3. Everett M. Dirksen (R)

==== Indiana ====
▌1. Vance Hartke (D)
▌3. Birch Bayh (D)

==== Iowa ====
▌2. Jack Miller (R)
▌3. Bourke B. Hickenlooper (R)

==== Kansas ====
▌2. James B. Pearson (R)
▌3. Frank Carlson (R)

==== Kentucky ====
▌2. John Sherman Cooper (R)
▌3. Thruston Ballard Morton (R)

==== Louisiana ====
▌2. Allen J. Ellender (D)
▌3. Russell B. Long (D)

==== Maine ====
▌1. Edmund Muskie (D)
▌2. Margaret Chase Smith (R)

==== Maryland ====
▌1. Joseph Tydings (D)
▌3. Daniel Brewster (D)

==== Massachusetts ====
▌1. Ted Kennedy (D)
▌2. Leverett Saltonstall (R)

==== Michigan ====
▌1. Philip Hart (D)
▌2. Patrick V. McNamara (D), until April 30, 1966

▌Robert P. Griffin (R), from May 11, 1966

==== Minnesota ====
▌1. Eugene McCarthy (DFL) (Note: The Minnesota Democratic–Farmer–Labor Party (DFL) and the North Dakota Democratic-Nonpartisan League Party (D-NPL) are the Minnesota and North Dakota affiliates of the U.S. Democratic Party and are counted as Democrats.)
▌2. Walter Mondale (DFL)

==== Mississippi ====
▌1. John C. Stennis (D)
▌2. James Eastland (D)

==== Missouri ====
▌1. Stuart Symington (D)
▌3. Edward V. Long (D)

==== Montana ====
▌1. Mike Mansfield (D)
▌2. Lee Metcalf (D)

==== Nebraska ====
▌1. Roman Hruska (R)
▌2. Carl Curtis (R)

==== Nevada ====
▌1. Howard Cannon (D)
▌3. Alan Bible (D)

==== New Hampshire ====
▌2. Thomas J. McIntyre (D)
▌3. Norris Cotton (R)

==== New Jersey ====
▌1. Harrison A. Williams (D)
▌2. Clifford P. Case (R)

==== New Mexico ====
▌1. Joseph Montoya (D)
▌2. Clinton P. Anderson (D)

==== New York ====
▌1. Robert F. Kennedy (D)
▌3. Jacob Javits (R)

==== North Carolina ====
▌2. B. Everett Jordan (D)
▌3. Sam Ervin (D)

==== North Dakota ====
▌1. Quentin Burdick (D-NPL)
▌3. Milton Young (R)

==== Ohio ====
▌1. Stephen M. Young (D)
▌3. Frank Lausche (D)

==== Oklahoma ====
▌2. Fred R. Harris (D)
▌3. A. S. Mike Monroney (D)

==== Oregon ====
▌2. Maurine Neuberger (D)
▌3. Wayne Morse (D)

==== Pennsylvania ====
▌1. Hugh Scott (R)
▌3. Joseph S. Clark Jr. (D)

==== Rhode Island ====
▌1. John Pastore (D)
▌2. Claiborne Pell (D)

==== South Carolina ====
▌2. Strom Thurmond (R)
▌3. Olin D. Johnston (D), until April 18, 1965

▌Donald S. Russell (D), from April 22, 1965 – November 8, 1966
▌Fritz Hollings (D), from November 9, 1966

==== South Dakota ====
▌2. Karl E. Mundt (R)
▌3. George McGovern (D)

==== Tennessee ====
▌1. Albert Gore Sr. (D)
▌2. Ross Bass (D), until January 2, 1967

==== Texas ====
▌1. Ralph Yarborough (D)
▌2. John Tower (R)

==== Utah ====
▌1. Frank Moss (D)
▌3. Wallace F. Bennett (R)

==== Vermont ====
▌1. Winston L. Prouty (R)
▌3. George Aiken (R)

==== Virginia ====
▌1. Harry F. Byrd (D), until November 10, 1965

▌Harry F. Byrd Jr. (D), from November 12, 1965

▌2. A. Willis Robertson (D), until December 30, 1966

▌William B. Spong Jr. (D), from December 31, 1966

==== Washington ====
▌1. Henry M. Jackson (D)
▌3. Warren G. Magnuson (D)

==== West Virginia ====
▌1. Robert Byrd (D)
▌2. Jennings Randolph (D)

==== Wisconsin ====
▌1. William Proxmire (D)
▌3. Gaylord Nelson (D)

==== Wyoming ====
▌1. Gale W. McGee (D)
▌2. Milward Simpson (R)

Senators' party membership by state at the opening of the 89th Congress in January 1965 2 Democrats 1 Democrat and 1 Republican 2 Republicans

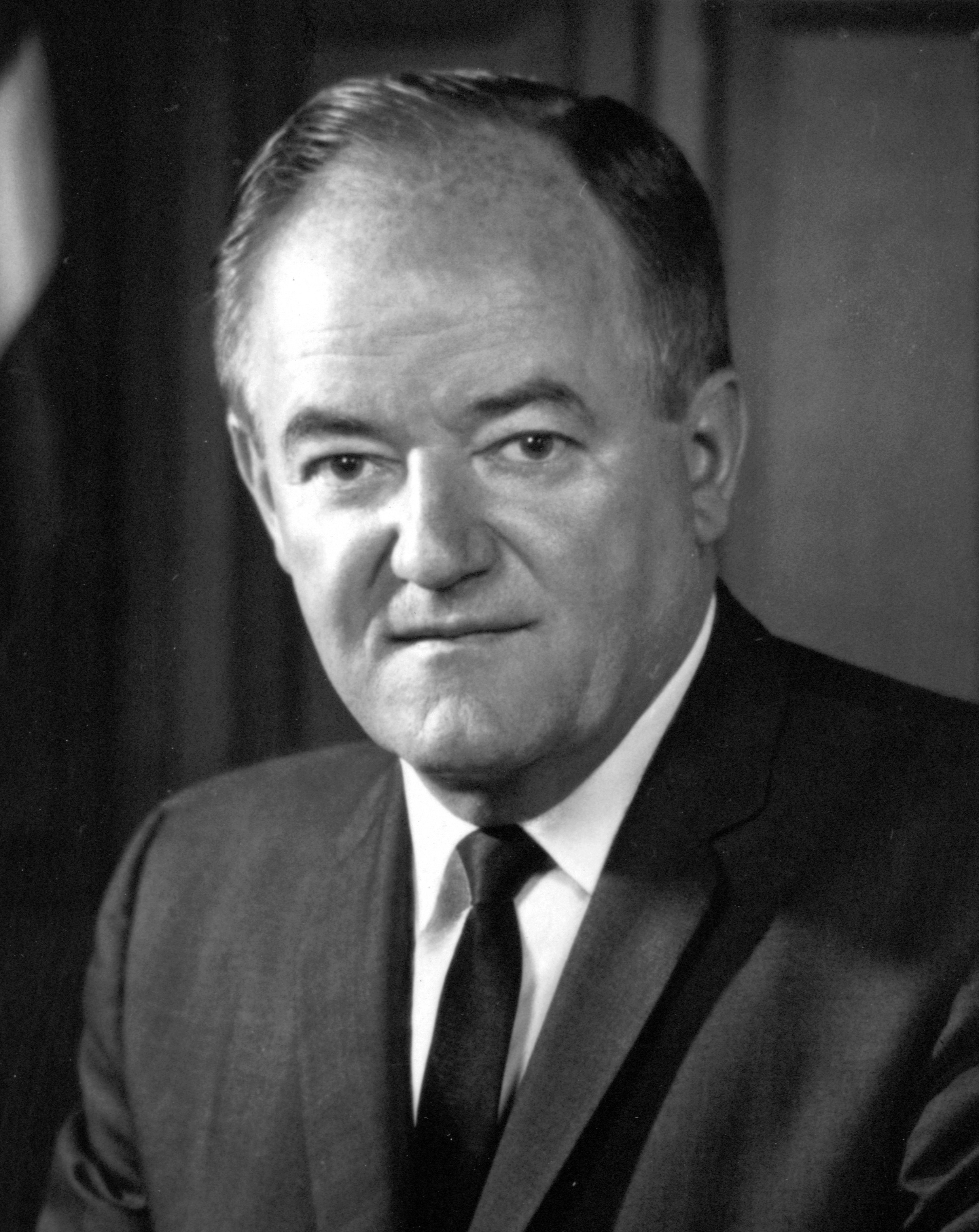
Senate President Hubert Humphrey

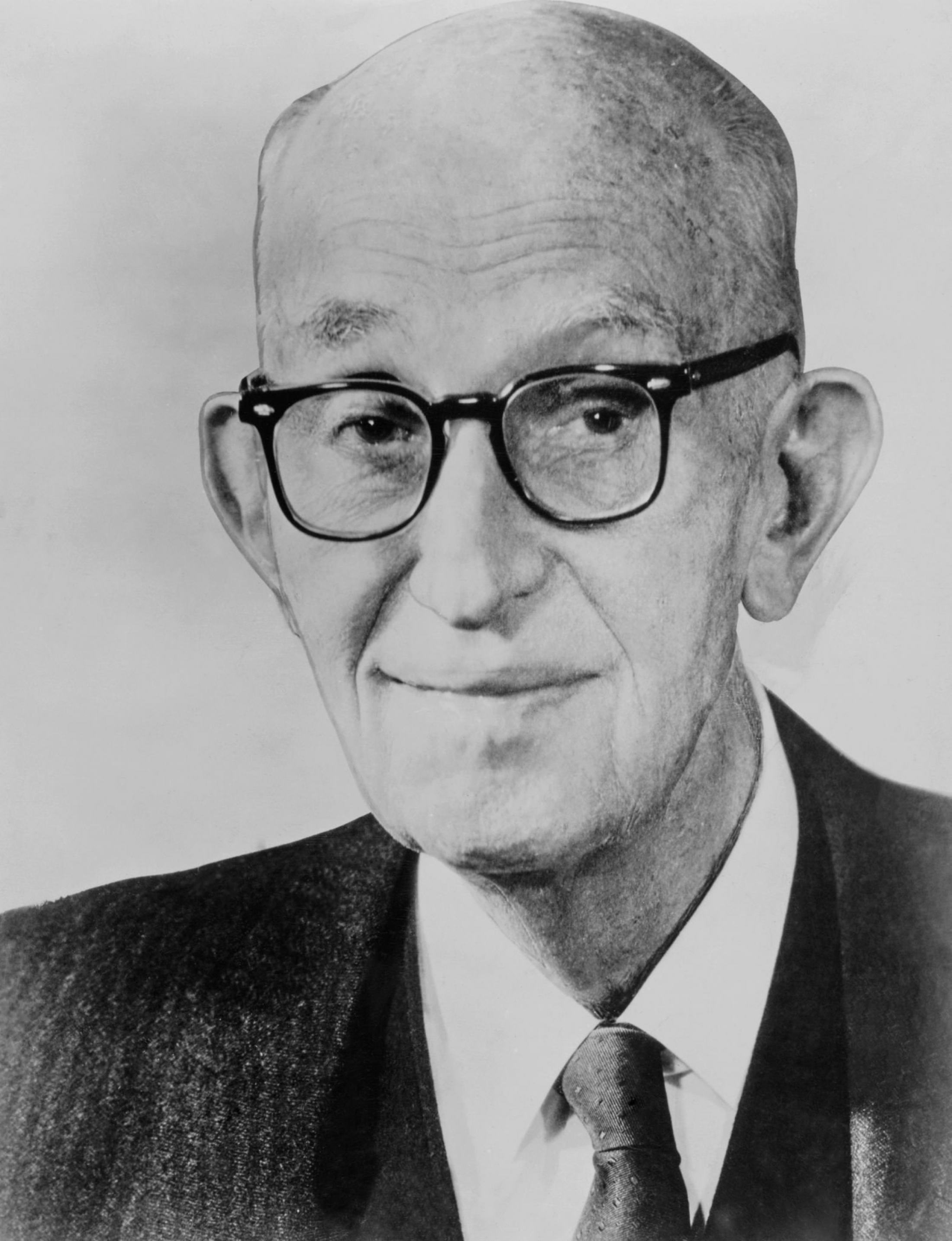
Senate President pro tempore Carl Hayden

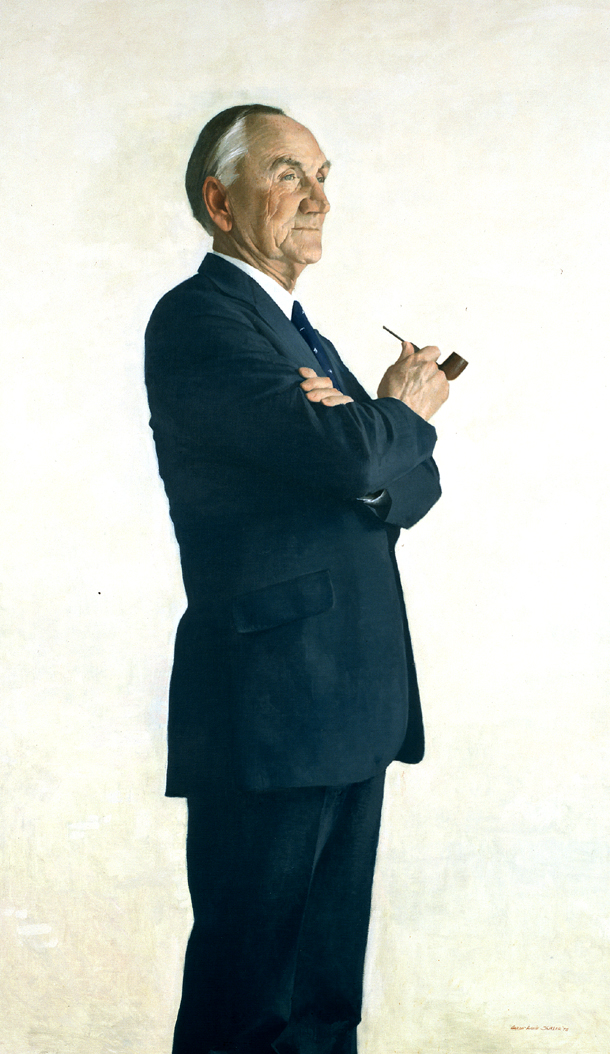
Senate Majority leader Mike Mansfield

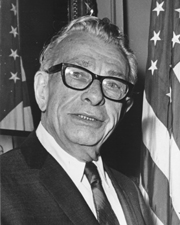
Senate Minority leader Everett Dirksen

=== House of Representatives ===
The names of representatives are preceded by their district numbers.

==== Alabama ====
▌1. Jack Edwards (R)
▌2. William Louis Dickinson (R)
▌3. George W. Andrews (D)
▌4. Glenn Andrews (R)
▌5. Armistead I. Selden Jr. (D)
▌6. John Hall Buchanan Jr. (R)
▌7. James D. Martin (R)
▌8. Robert E. Jones Jr. (D)

==== Alaska ====
▌At-large. Ralph Julian Rivers (D), until December 30, 1966

==== Arizona ====
▌1. John Jacob Rhodes (R)
▌2. Mo Udall (D)
▌3. George F. Senner Jr. (D)

==== Arkansas ====
▌1. Ezekiel C. Gathings (D)
▌2. Wilbur Mills (D)
▌3. James William Trimble (D)
▌4. Oren Harris (D), until February 3, 1966

▌David Pryor (D), from November 8, 1966

==== California ====
▌1. Donald H. Clausen (R)
▌2. Harold T. Johnson (D)
▌3. John E. Moss (D)
▌4. Robert L. Leggett (D)
▌5. Phillip Burton (D)
▌6. William S. Mailliard (R)
▌7. Jeffery Cohelan (D)
▌8. George P. Miller (D)
▌9. Don Edwards (D)
▌10. Charles Gubser (R)
▌11. J. Arthur Younger (R)
▌12. Burt Talcott (R)
▌13. Charles M. Teague (R)
▌14. John F. Baldwin Jr. (R), until March 9, 1966

▌Jerome Waldie (D), from June 7, 1966

▌15. John J. McFall (D)
▌16. B. F. Sisk (D)
▌17. Cecil R. King (D)
▌18. Harlan Hagen (D)
▌19. Chester E. Holifield (D)
▌20. H. Allen Smith (R)
▌21. Augustus Hawkins (D)
▌22. James C. Corman (D)
▌23. Del M. Clawson (R)
▌24. Glenard P. Lipscomb (R)
▌25. Ronald B. Cameron (D)
▌26. James Roosevelt (D), until September 30, 1965

▌Thomas M. Rees (D), from December 15, 1965

▌27. Edwin Reinecke (R)
▌28. Alphonzo E. Bell Jr. (R)
▌29. George Brown Jr. (D)
▌30. Edward R. Roybal (D)
▌31. Charles H. Wilson (D)
▌32. Craig Hosmer (R)
▌33. Kenneth W. Dyal (D)
▌34. Richard T. Hanna (D)
▌35. James B. Utt (R)
▌36. Bob Wilson (R)
▌37. Lionel Van Deerlin (D)
▌38. John V. Tunney (D)

==== Colorado ====
▌1. Byron G. Rogers (D)
▌2. Roy H. McVicker (D)
▌3. Frank Evans (D)
▌4. Wayne N. Aspinall (D)

==== Connecticut ====
▌1. Emilio Q. Daddario (D)
▌2. William St. Onge (D)
▌3. Robert Giaimo (D)
▌4. Donald J. Irwin (D)
▌5. John S. Monagan (D)
▌6. Bernard F. Grabowski (D)

==== Delaware ====
▌At-large. Harris McDowell (D)

==== Florida ====
▌1. Robert L. F. Sikes (D)
▌2. Charles E. Bennett (D)
▌3. Claude Pepper (D)
▌4. Dante Fascell (D)
▌5. Syd Herlong (D)
▌6. Paul Rogers (D)
▌7. James A. Haley (D)
▌8. Donald Ray Matthews (D)
▌9. Don Fuqua (D)
▌10. Sam Gibbons (D)
▌11. Edward Gurney (R)
▌12. William C. Cramer (R)

==== Georgia ====
▌1. George Elliott Hagan (D)
▌2. Maston E. O'Neal Jr. (D)
▌3. Bo Callaway (R)
▌4. James MacKay (D)
▌5. Charles L. Weltner (D)
▌6. John Flynt (D)
▌7. John William Davis (D)
▌8. J. Russell Tuten (D)
▌9. Phillip M. Landrum (D)
▌10. Robert Grier Stephens Jr. (D)

==== Hawaii ====
▌At-large. Spark Matsunaga (D)
▌At-large. Patsy Mink (D)

==== Idaho ====
▌1. Compton I. White Jr. (D)
▌2. George V. Hansen (R)

==== Illinois ====
▌1. William L. Dawson (D)
▌2. Barratt O'Hara (D)
▌3. William T. Murphy (D)
▌4. Ed Derwinski (R)
▌5. John C. Kluczynski (D)
▌6. Daniel J. Ronan (D)
▌7. Frank Annunzio (D)
▌8. Dan Rostenkowski (D)
▌9. Sidney R. Yates (D)
▌10. Harold R. Collier (R)
▌11. Roman Pucinski (D)
▌12. Robert McClory (R)
▌13. Donald Rumsfeld (R)
▌14. John N. Erlenborn (R)
▌15. Charlotte Thompson Reid (R)
▌16. John B. Anderson (R)
▌17. Leslie C. Arends (R)
▌18. Robert H. Michel (R)
▌19. Gale Schisler (D)
▌20. Paul Findley (R)
▌21. Kenneth J. Gray (D)
▌22. William L. Springer (R)
▌23. George E. Shipley (D)
▌24. Melvin Price (D)

==== Indiana ====
▌1. Ray Madden (D)
▌2. Charles A. Halleck (R)
▌3. John Brademas (D)
▌4. E. Ross Adair (R)
▌5. J. Edward Roush (D)
▌6. Richard L. Roudebush (R)
▌7. William G. Bray (R)
▌8. Winfield K. Denton (D), until December 30, 1966
▌9. Lee Hamilton (D)
▌10. Ralph Harvey (R), until December 30, 1966
▌11. Andrew Jacobs Jr. (D)

==== Iowa ====
▌1. John R. Schmidhauser (D)
▌2. John Culver (D)
▌3. H. R. Gross (R)
▌4. Bert Bandstra (D)
▌5. Neal Edward Smith (D)
▌6. Stanley L. Greigg (D)
▌7. John R. Hansen (D)

==== Kansas ====
▌1. Bob Dole (R)
▌2. Chester L. Mize (R)
▌3. Robert Ellsworth (R)
▌4. Garner E. Shriver (R)
▌5. Joe Skubitz (R)

==== Kentucky ====
▌1. Frank Stubblefield (D)
▌2. William Natcher (D)
▌3. Charles R. Farnsley (D)
▌4. Frank Chelf (D)
▌5. Tim Lee Carter (R)
▌6. John C. Watts (D)
▌7. Carl D. Perkins (D)

==== Louisiana ====
▌1. F. Edward Hébert (D)
▌2. Hale Boggs (D)
▌3. Edwin E. Willis (D)
▌4. Joe Waggonner (D)
▌5. Otto Passman (D)
▌6. James H. Morrison (D)
▌7. T. Ashton Thompson (D), until July 1, 1965

▌Edwin Edwards (D), from October 2, 1965

▌8. Speedy Long (D)

==== Maine ====
▌1. Stanley R. Tupper (R)
▌2. William Hathaway (D)

==== Maryland ====
▌1. Rogers Morton (R)
▌2. Clarence Long (D)
▌3. Edward Garmatz (D)
▌4. George Hyde Fallon (D)
▌5. Hervey Machen (D)
▌6. Charles Mathias (R)
▌7. Samuel Friedel (D)
▌At-large. Carlton R. Sickles (D)

==== Massachusetts ====
▌1. Silvio O. Conte (R)
▌2. Edward Boland (D)
▌3. Philip J. Philbin (D)
▌4. Harold Donohue (D)
▌5. F. Bradford Morse (R)
▌6. William H. Bates (R)
▌7. Torbert Macdonald (D)
▌8. Tip O'Neill (D)
▌9. John W. McCormack (D)
▌10. Joseph W. Martin Jr. (R)
▌11. James A. Burke (D)
▌12. Hastings Keith (R)

==== Michigan ====
▌1. John Conyers (D)
▌2. Weston E. Vivian (D)
▌3. Paul H. Todd Jr. (D)
▌4. J. Edward Hutchinson (R)
▌5. Gerald Ford (R)
▌6. Charles E. Chamberlain (R)
▌7. John C. Mackie (D)
▌8. R. James Harvey (R)
▌9. Robert P. Griffin (R), until May 10, 1966

▌Guy Vander Jagt (R), from November 8, 1966

▌10. Elford Albin Cederberg (R)
▌11. Raymond F. Clevenger (D)
▌12. James G. O'Hara (D)
▌13. Charles Diggs (D)
▌14. Lucien Nedzi (D)
▌15. William D. Ford (D)
▌16. John D. Dingell Jr. (D)
▌17. Martha Griffiths (D)
▌18. William Broomfield (R)
▌19. Billie S. Farnum (D)

==== Minnesota ====
▌1. Al Quie (R)
▌2. Ancher Nelsen (R)
▌3. Clark MacGregor (R)
▌4. Joseph Karth (DFL)
▌5. Donald M. Fraser (DFL)
▌6. Alec G. Olson (DFL)
▌7. Odin Langen (R)
▌8. John Blatnik (DFL)

==== Mississippi ====
▌1. Thomas Abernethy (D)
▌2. Jamie L. Whitten (D)
▌3. John Bell Williams (D)
▌4. Prentiss Walker (R)
▌5. William M. Colmer (D)

==== Missouri ====
▌1. Frank M. Karsten (D)
▌2. Thomas B. Curtis (R)
▌3. Leonor Sullivan (D)
▌4. William J. Randall (D)
▌5. Richard Walker Bolling (D)
▌6. William Raleigh Hull Jr. (D)
▌7. Durward Gorham Hall (R)
▌8. Richard Howard Ichord Jr. (D)
▌9. William L. Hungate (D)
▌10. Paul C. Jones (D)

==== Montana ====
▌1. Arnold Olsen (D)
▌2. James F. Battin (R)

==== Nebraska ====
▌1. Clair Armstrong Callan (D)
▌2. Glenn Cunningham (R)
▌3. David Martin (R)

==== Nevada ====
▌At-large. Walter S. Baring Jr. (D)

==== New Hampshire ====
▌1. Joseph Oliva Huot (D)
▌2. James Colgate Cleveland (R)

==== New Jersey ====
▌1. William T. Cahill (R)
▌2. Thomas C. McGrath Jr. (D)
▌3. James J. Howard (D)
▌4. Frank Thompson (D)
▌5. Peter Frelinghuysen Jr. (R)
▌6. Florence P. Dwyer (R)
▌7. William B. Widnall (R)
▌8. Charles Samuel Joelson (D)
▌9. Henry Helstoski (D)
▌10. Peter W. Rodino (D)
▌11. Joseph Minish (D)
▌12. Paul J. Krebs (D)
▌13. Cornelius Gallagher (D)
▌14. Dominick V. Daniels (D)
▌15. Edward J. Patten (D)

==== New Mexico ====
▌At-large. Thomas G. Morris (D)
▌At-large. E. S. Johnny Walker (D)

==== New York ====
▌1. Otis G. Pike (D)
▌2. James R. Grover Jr. (R)
▌3. Lester L. Wolff (D)
▌4. John W. Wydler (R)
▌5. Herbert Tenzer (D)
▌6. Seymour Halpern (R)
▌7. Joseph P. Addabbo (D)
▌8. Benjamin Stanley Rosenthal (D)
▌9. James J. Delaney (D)
▌10. Emanuel Celler (D)
▌11. Eugene J. Keogh (D)
▌12. Edna F. Kelly (D)
▌13. Abraham J. Multer (D)
▌14. John J. Rooney (D)
▌15. Hugh Carey (D)
▌16. John M. Murphy (D)
▌17. John Lindsay (R), until December 31, 1965

▌Theodore R. Kupferman (R), from February 8, 1966

▌18. Adam Clayton Powell Jr. (D)
▌19. Leonard Farbstein (D)
▌20. William Fitts Ryan (D)
▌21. James H. Scheuer (D)
▌22. Jacob H. Gilbert (D)
▌23. Jonathan Brewster Bingham (D)
▌24. Paul A. Fino (R)
▌25. Richard Ottinger (D)
▌26. Ogden Reid (R)
▌27. John G. Dow (D)
▌28. Joseph Y. Resnick (D)
▌29. Leo W. O'Brien (D), until December 30, 1966
▌30. Carleton J. King (R)
▌31. Robert C. McEwen (R)
▌32. Alexander Pirnie (R)
▌33. Howard W. Robison (R)
▌34. James M. Hanley (D)
▌35. Samuel S. Stratton (D)
▌36. Frank Horton (R)
▌37. Barber Conable (R)
▌38. Charles Goodell (R)
▌39. Richard D. McCarthy (D)
▌40. Henry P. Smith III (R)
▌41. Thaddeus J. Dulski (D)

==== North Carolina ====
▌1. Herbert Covington Bonner (D), until November 7, 1965

▌Walter B. Jones Sr. (D), from February 5, 1966

▌2. Lawrence H. Fountain (D)
▌3. David N. Henderson (D)
▌4. Harold D. Cooley (D), until December 30, 1966
▌5. Ralph James Scott (D)
▌6. Horace R. Kornegay (D)
▌7. Alton Lennon (D)
▌8. Charles R. Jonas (R)
▌9. Jim Broyhill (R)
▌10. Basil Lee Whitener (D)
▌11. Roy A. Taylor (D)

==== North Dakota ====
▌1. Mark Andrews (R)
▌2. Rolland W. Redlin (D-NPL)

==== Ohio ====
▌1. John J. Gilligan (D)
▌2. Donald D. Clancy (R)
▌3. Rodney M. Love (D)
▌4. William Moore McCulloch (R)
▌5. Del Latta (R)
▌6. Bill Harsha (R)
▌7. Clarence J. Brown (R), until August 23, 1965

▌Bud Brown (R) from November 2, 1965

▌8. Jackson Edward Betts (R)
▌9. Thomas L. Ashley (D)
▌10. Walter H. Moeller (D)
▌11. J. William Stanton (R)
▌12. Samuel L. Devine (R)
▌13. Charles Adams Mosher (R)
▌14. William Hanes Ayres (R)
▌15. Robert T. Secrest (D), until December 30, 1966
▌16. Frank T. Bow (R)
▌17. John M. Ashbrook (R)
▌18. Wayne Hays (D)
▌19. Michael J. Kirwan (D)
▌20. Michael A. Feighan (D)
▌21. Charles Vanik (D)
▌22. Frances P. Bolton (R)
▌23. William Edwin Minshall Jr. (R)
▌At-large. Robert E. Sweeney (D)

==== Oklahoma ====
▌1. Page Belcher (R)
▌2. Ed Edmondson (D)
▌3. Carl Albert (D)
▌4. Tom Steed (D)
▌5. John Jarman (D)
▌6. Jed Johnson Jr. (D)

==== Oregon ====
▌1. Wendell Wyatt (R)
▌2. Al Ullman (D)
▌3. Edith Green (D)
▌4. Robert B. Duncan (D)

==== Pennsylvania ====
▌1. William A. Barrett (D)
▌2. Robert N. C. Nix Sr. (D)
▌3. James A. Byrne (D)
▌4. Herman Toll (D)
▌5. William J. Green III (D)
▌6. George M. Rhodes (D)
▌7. George Watkins (R)
▌8. Willard S. Curtin (R)
▌9. Paul B. Dague (R), until December 30, 1966
▌10. Joseph M. McDade (R)
▌11. Dan Flood (D)
▌12. J. Irving Whalley (R)
▌13. Richard Schweiker (R)
▌14. William S. Moorhead (D)
▌15. Fred B. Rooney (D)
▌16. John C. Kunkel (R), until December 30, 1966
▌17. Herman T. Schneebeli (R)
▌18. Robert J. Corbett (R)
▌19. Nathaniel N. Craley Jr. (D)
▌20. Elmer J. Holland (D)
▌21. John Herman Dent (D)
▌22. John P. Saylor (R)
▌23. Albert W. Johnson (R)
▌24. Joseph P. Vigorito (D)
▌25. Frank M. Clark (D)
▌26. Thomas E. Morgan (D)
▌27. James G. Fulton (R)

==== Rhode Island ====
▌1. Fernand St Germain (D)
▌2. John E. Fogarty (D)

==== South Carolina ====
▌1. L. Mendel Rivers (D)
▌2. Albert Watson (D), until February 1, 1965

▌Albert Watson (R), from June 15, 1965

▌3. William Jennings Bryan Dorn (D)
▌4. Robert T. Ashmore (D)
▌5. Thomas S. Gettys (D)
▌6. John L. McMillan (D)

==== South Dakota ====
▌1. Ben Reifel (R)
▌2. Ellis Yarnal Berry (R)

==== Tennessee ====
▌1. Jimmy Quillen (R)
▌2. John Duncan Sr. (R)
▌3. Bill Brock (R)
▌4. Joe L. Evins (D)
▌5. Richard Fulton (D)
▌6. William Anderson (D)
▌7. Tom J. Murray (D), until December 30, 1966
▌8. Fats Everett (D)
▌9. George W. Grider (D)

==== Texas ====
▌1. Wright Patman (D)
▌2. Jack Brooks (D)
▌3. Lindley Beckworth (D)
▌4. Ray Roberts (D)
▌5. Earle Cabell (D)
▌6. Olin E. Teague (D)
▌7. John Dowdy (D)
▌8. Albert Thomas (D), until February 15, 1966

▌Lera Millard Thomas (D), from March 26, 1966

▌9. Clark W. Thompson (D), until December 30, 1966
▌10. J. J. Pickle (D)
▌11. William R. Poage (D)
▌12. Jim Wright (D)
▌13. Graham B. Purcell Jr. (D)
▌14. John Andrew Young (D)
▌15. Kika de la Garza (D)
▌16. Richard Crawford White (D)
▌17. Omar Burleson (D)
▌18. Walter E. Rogers (D)
▌19. George H. Mahon (D)
▌20. Henry B. González (D)
▌21. O. C. Fisher (D)
▌22. Robert R. Casey (D)
▌At-large. Joe R. Pool (D)

==== Utah ====
▌1. Laurence J. Burton (R)
▌2. David S. King (D)

==== Vermont ====
▌At-large. Robert Stafford (R)

==== Virginia ====
▌1. Thomas N. Downing (D)
▌2. Porter Hardy Jr. (D)
▌3. David E. Satterfield III (D)
▌4. Watkins Moorman Abbitt (D)
▌5. William M. Tuck (D)
▌6. Richard Harding Poff (R)
▌7. John Otho Marsh Jr. (D)
▌8. Howard W. Smith (D)
▌9. W. Pat Jennings (D)
▌10. Joel Broyhill (R)

==== Washington ====
▌1. Thomas Pelly (R)
▌2. Lloyd Meeds (D)
▌3. Julia Butler Hansen (D)
▌4. Catherine Dean May (R)
▌5. Tom Foley (D)
▌6. Floyd Hicks (D)
▌7. Brock Adams (D)

==== West Virginia ====
▌1. Arch A. Moore Jr. (R)
▌2. Harley Orrin Staggers (D)
▌3. John M. Slack Jr. (D)
▌4. Ken Hechler (D)
▌5. James Kee (D)

==== Wisconsin ====
▌1. Lynn E. Stalbaum (D)
▌2. Robert Kastenmeier (D)
▌3. Vernon Wallace Thomson (R)
▌4. Clement J. Zablocki (D)
▌5. Henry S. Reuss (D)
▌6. John Abner Race (D)
▌7. Melvin Laird (R)
▌8. John W. Byrnes (R)
▌9. Glenn Robert Davis (R)
▌10. Alvin O'Konski (R)

==== Wyoming ====
▌At-large. Teno Roncalio (D)

==== Non-voting member ====
▌Puerto Rico. Santiago Polanco-Abreu (Resident Commissioner) (PPD)

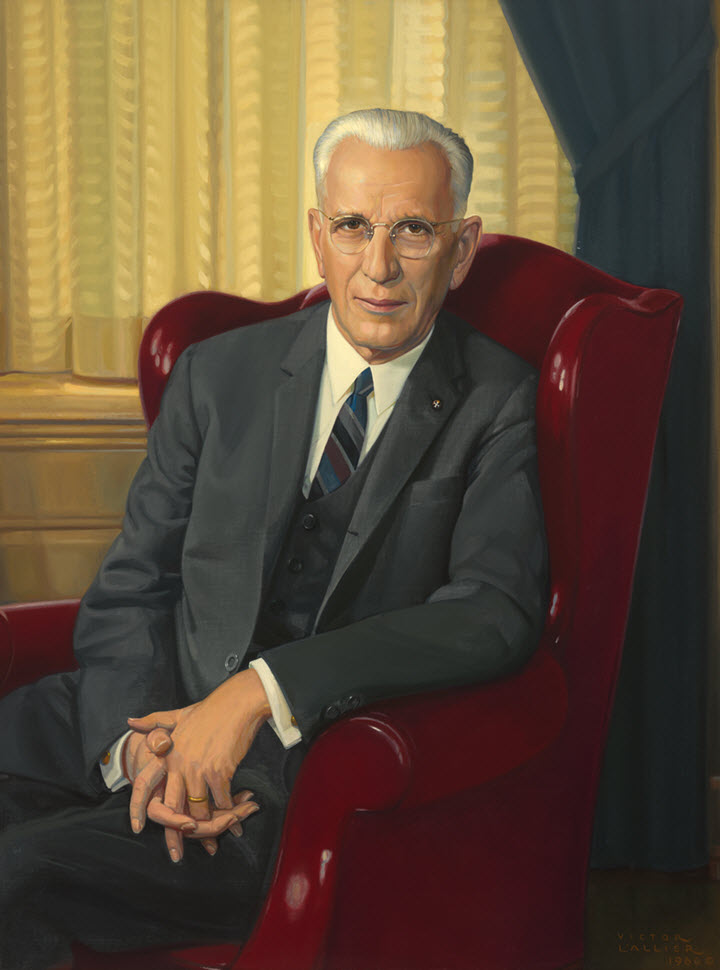
House Speaker John W. McCormack

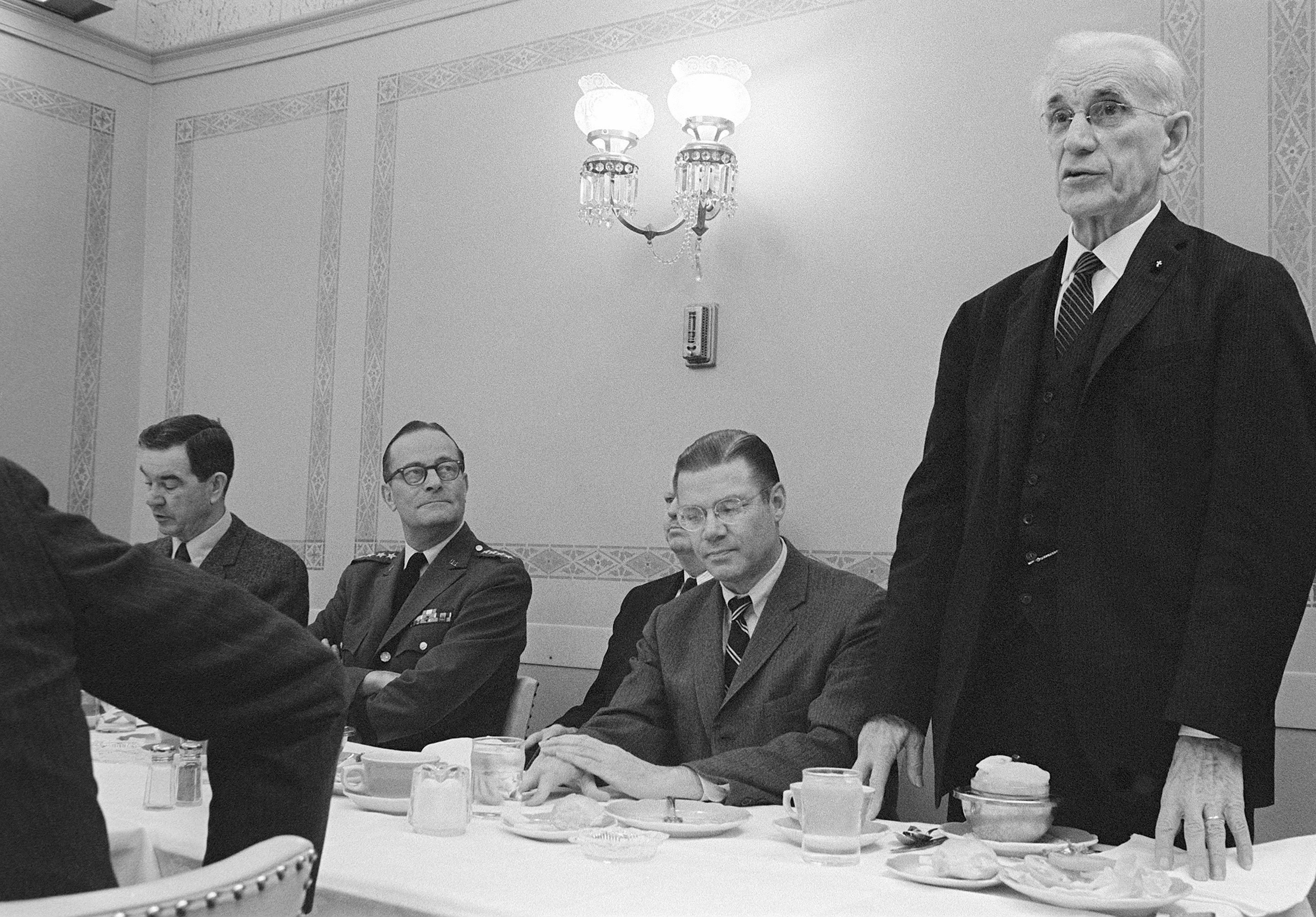
House Speaker John W. McCormack (standing), speaking at a Department of Defense luncheon, February 1966.

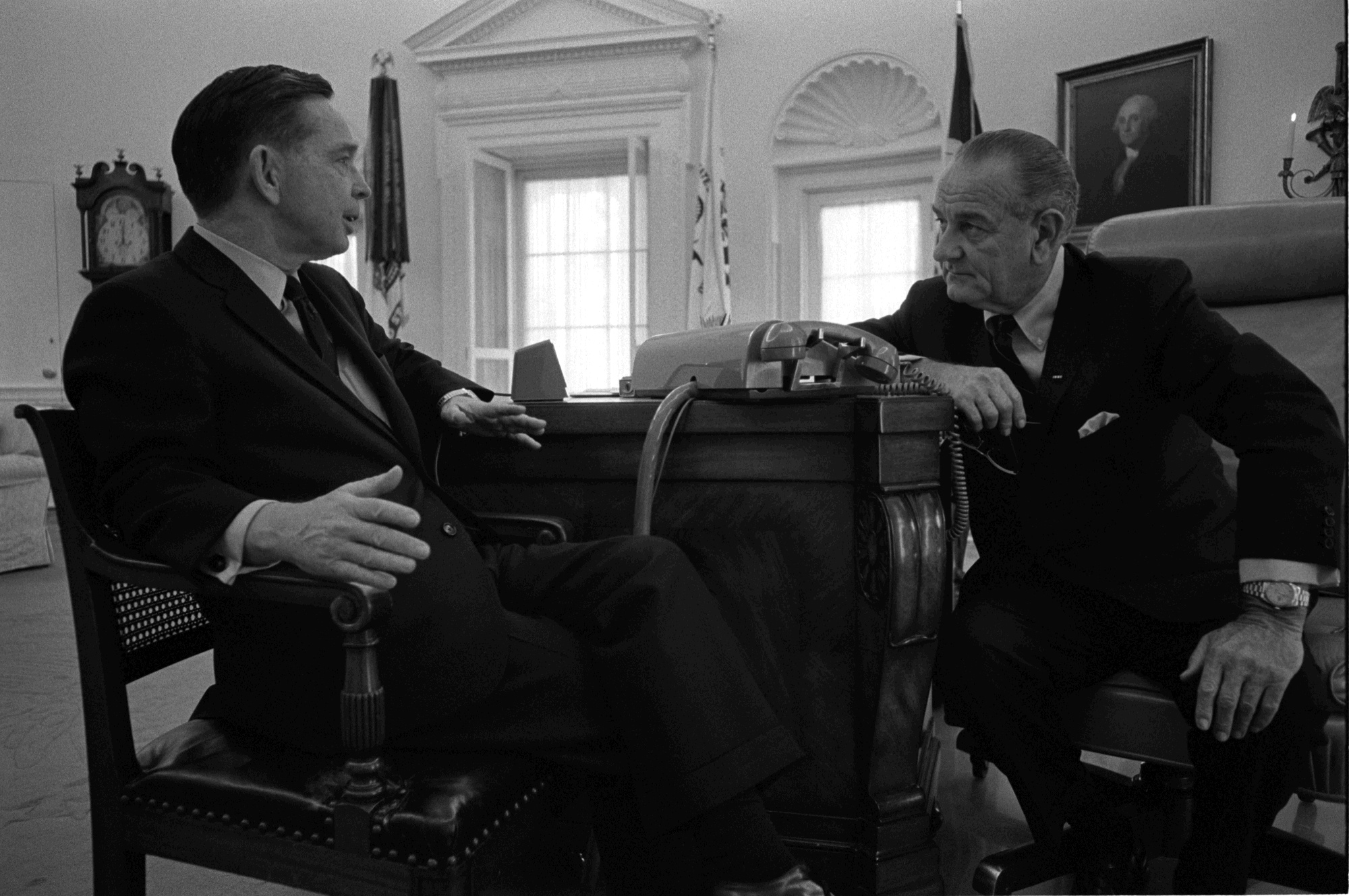
House Majority leader Carl Albert with President Johnson

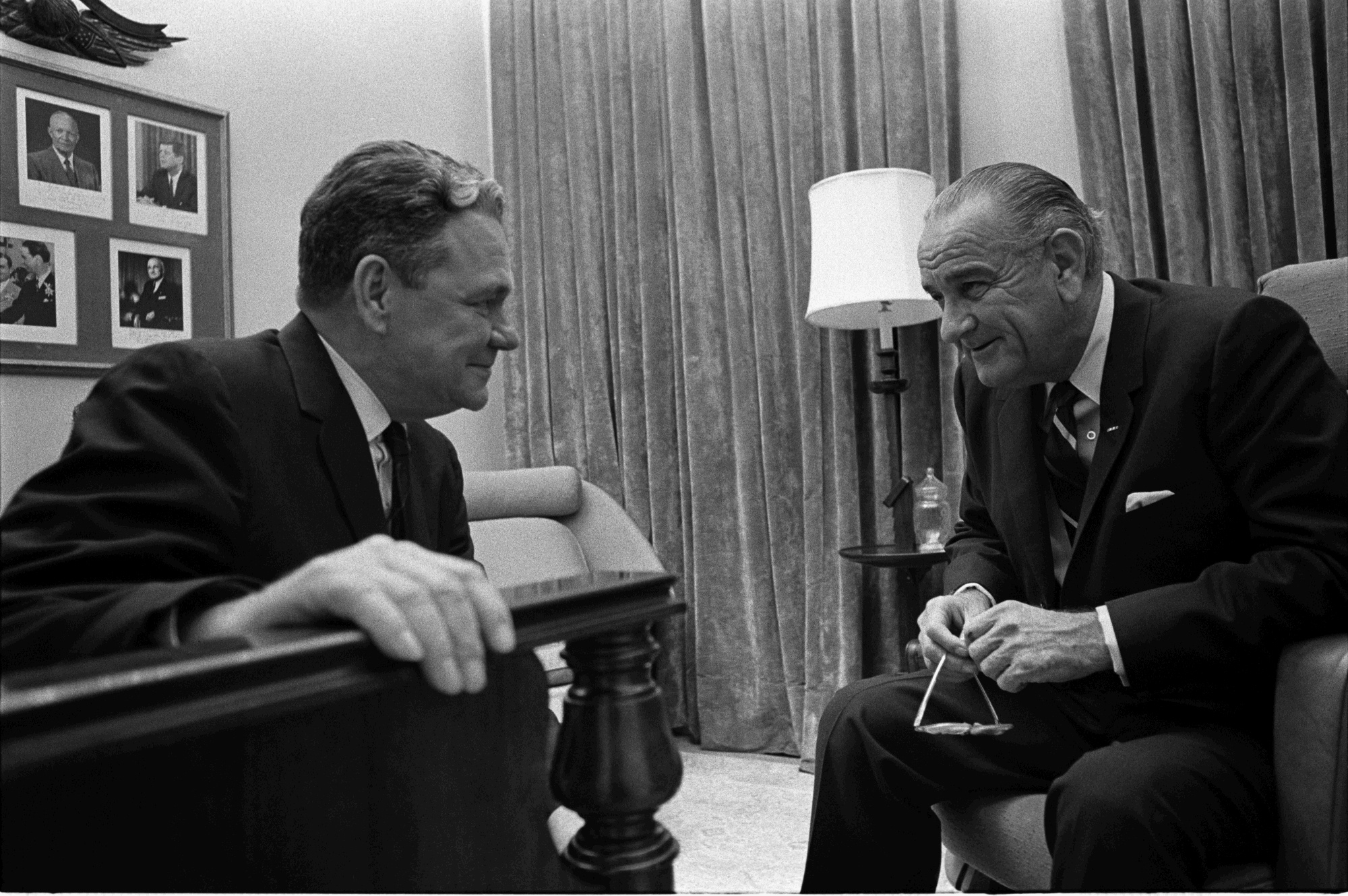
House Majority whip Hale Boggs with President Johnson

== Changes in membership ==
=== Senate ===
- Replacements: 5
  - Democratic: 1-seat net loss
  - Republican: 1-seat net gain
- Deaths: 2
- Resignations: 2

Senate changes
State (class)	Vacated by	Reason for change	Successor	Date of successor's formal installation (Note: When seated or oath administered, not necessarily when service began.)
South Carolina (3)	Olin D. Johnston (D)	Died April 18, 1965. Successor appointed April 22, 1965 to continue the term.	Donald S. Russell (D)	April 22, 1965
Virginia (1)	Harry F. Byrd (D)	Resigned November 10, 1965. Successor appointed November 12, 1965 to continue his father's term.	Harry F. Byrd Jr. (D)	November 12, 1965
Michigan (2)	Patrick V. McNamara (D)	Died April 30, 1966. Successor appointed May 11, 1966 to finish the term.	Robert P. Griffin (R)	May 11, 1966
South Carolina (3)	Donald S. Russell (D)	Interim appointee lost nomination to finish the term. Successor elected November 8, 1966.	Fritz Hollings (D)	November 9, 1966
Virginia (2)	Absalom Willis Robertson (D)	Resigned December 30, 1966, having lost renomination. Successor appointed to finish the term, having already been elected to the next term.	William B. Spong Jr. (D)	December 31, 1966
Tennessee (2)	Ross Bass (D)	Resigned January 2, 1967, having lost renomination. Seat remained vacant until the end of the term (the next day).	Vacant	Not filled this term

=== House of Representatives ===
- Replacements: 9
  - Democratic: no net change
  - Republican: no net change
- Deaths: 5
- Resignations: 15
- Total seats with changes: 20

House changes
District	Vacated by	Reason for change	Successor	Date of successor's formal installation
South Carolina 2nd	Albert Watson (D)	Resigned February 1, 1965, after being stripped of seniority by the House Democratic Caucus for supporting Republican Presidential candidate Barry Goldwater. Was re-elected as a Republican in a special election to replace himself.	Albert Watson (R)	June 15, 1965
Louisiana 7th	T. Ashton Thompson (D)	Died July 1, 1965	Edwin Edwards (D)	October 2, 1965
Ohio 7th	Clarence J. Brown (R)	Died August 23, 1965	Bud Brown (R)	November 2, 1965
California 26th	James Roosevelt (D)	Resigned September 30, 1965, to become the US Representative to the United Nations Economic and Social Council	Thomas M. Rees (D)	December 15, 1965
North Carolina 1st	Herbert Covington Bonner (D)	Died November 7, 1965	Walter B. Jones Sr. (D)	February 5, 1966
New York 17th	John Lindsay (R)	Resigned December 31, 1965, after being elected Mayor of New York City	Theodore R. Kupferman (R)	February 8, 1966
Arkansas 4th	Oren Harris (D)	Resigned February 3, 1966, to become judge of the US Court of the Eastern and Western Districts of Arkansas	David Pryor (D)	November 8, 1966
Texas 8th	Albert Thomas (D)	Died February 15, 1966	Lera Millard Thomas (D)	March 26, 1966
California 14th	John F. Baldwin Jr. (R)	Died March 9, 1966	Jerome Waldie (D)	June 7, 1966
Michigan 9th	Robert P. Griffin (R)	Resigned May 10, 1966, after being appointed to the U.S. Senate	Guy Vander Jagt (R)	November 8, 1966
Alaska at-large	Ralph Julian Rivers (D)	Resigned December 30, 1966	Vacant	Not filled this term
Indiana 8th	Winfield K. Denton (D)	Resigned December 30, 1966	Vacant	Not filled this term
Indiana 10th	Ralph Harvey (R)	Resigned December 30, 1966	Vacant	Not filled this term
New York 29th	Leo W. O'Brien (D)	Resigned December 30, 1966	Vacant	Not filled this term
North Carolina 4th	Harold D. Cooley (D)	Resigned December 30, 1966	Vacant	Not filled this term
Ohio 15th	Robert T. Secrest (D)	Resigned December 30, 1966	Vacant	Not filled this term
Pennsylvania 9th	Paul B. Dague (R)	Resigned December 30, 1966	Vacant	Not filled this term
Pennsylvania 16th	John C. Kunkel (R)	Resigned December 30, 1966	Vacant	Not filled this term
Tennessee 7th	Tom J. Murray (D)	Resigned December 30, 1966	Vacant	Not filled this term
Texas 9th	Clark W. Thompson (D)	Resigned December 30, 1966	Vacant	Not filled this term

== Committees ==
Lists of committees and their party leaders for members of the House and Senate committees can be found through the Official Congressional Directory at the bottom of this article. The directory after the pages of terms of service lists committees of the Senate, House (Standing with Subcommittees, Select and Special) and Joint and, after that, House/Senate committee assignments. On the committees section of the House and Senate in the Official Congressional Directory, the committee's members on the first row on the left side shows the chairman of the committee and on the right side shows the ranking member of the committee.

=== Senate ===
- Aeronautical and Space Sciences (Chairman: Clinton P. Anderson; Ranking Member: Margaret Chase Smith)
- Agriculture and Forestry (Chairman: Allen J. Ellender; Ranking Member: George D. Aiken)
- Appropriations (Chairman: Carl Hayden; Ranking Member: Leverett Saltonstall)
- Armed Services (Chairman: Richard B. Russell; Ranking Member: Leverett Saltonstall)
- Banking and Currency (Chairman: A. Willis Robertson; Ranking Member: Wallace F. Bennett)
- Commerce (Chairman: Warren G. Magnuson; Ranking Member: Norris Cotton)
- District of Columbia (Chairman: Alan Bible; Ranking Member: Winston L. Prouty)
- Finance (Chairman: Russell B. Long; Ranking Member: John J. Williams)
- Foreign Relations (Chairman: J. William Fulbright; Ranking Member: Bourke B. Hickenlooper)
- Government Operations (Chairman: John Little McClellan; Ranking Member: Karl E. Mundt)
- Interior and Insular Affairs (Chairman: Henry M. Jackson; Ranking Member: Thomas H. Kuchel)
- Judiciary (Chairman: James O. Eastland; Ranking Member: Everett Dirksen)
- Labor and Public Welfare (Chairman: J. Lister Hill; Ranking Member: Jacob K. Javits)
- Organization of Congress (Select) (Chairman: [data missing])
- Post Office and Civil Service (Chairman: A.S. Mike Monroney; Ranking Member: Frank Carlson)
- Public Works (Chairman: Pat McNamara; Ranking Member: John Sherman Cooper)
- Rules and Administration (Chairman: B. Everett Jordan; Ranking Member: Carl T. Curtis)
- Small Business (Select) (Chairman: John J. Sparkman)
- Standards and Conduct (Select) (Chairman: [data missing]; Ranking Member: [data missing])
- Whole

=== House of Representatives ===
- Agriculture (Chairman: Harold D. Cooley; Ranking Member: Paul B. Dague)
- Appropriations (Chairman: George H. Mahon; Ranking Member: Frank T. Bow)
- Armed Services (Chairman: L. Mendel Rivers; Ranking Member: William H. Bates)
- Banking and Currency (Chairman: Wright Patman; Ranking Member: William B. Widnall)
- District of Columbia (Chairman: John L. McMillan; Ranking Member: Ancher Nelsen)
- Education and Labor (Chairman: Adam Clayton Powell; Ranking Member: William H. Ayres)
- Foreign Affairs (Chairman: Thomas E. Morgan; Ranking Member: Frances P. Bolton)
- Government Operations (Chairman: William L. Dawson; Ranking Member: Clarence J. Brown)
- House Administration (Chairman: Omar Burleson; Ranking Member: Glenard P. Lipscomb)
- Interior and Insular Affairs (Chairman: Wayne N. Aspinall; Ranking Member: John P. Saylor)
- Interstate and Foreign Commerce (Chairman: Oren Harris; Ranking Member: William L. Springer)
- Judiciary (Chairman: Emanuel Celler; Ranking Member: William M. McCulloch)
- Merchant Marine and Fisheries (Chairman: Edward A. Garmatz; Ranking Member: William S. Mailliard)
- Post Office and Civil Service (Chairman: Tom J. Murray; Ranking Member: Robert J. Corbett)
- Public Works (Chairman: George Hyde Fallon; Ranking Member: William C. Cramer)
- Rules (Chairman: Howard W. Smith; Ranking Member: Clarence J. Brown)
- Science and Astronautics (Chairman: George Paul Miller; Ranking Member: Joseph W. Martin Jr.)
- Small Business (Select) (Chairman: Joe L. Evins)
- Standards of Official Conduct (Chairman: [data missing])
- Un-American Activities (Chairman: Edwin E. Willis; Ranking Member: John M. Ashbrook)
- Veterans' Affairs (Chairman: Olin E. Teague; Ranking Member: E. Ross Adair)
- Ways and Means (Chairman: Wilbur D. Mills; Ranking Member: John W. Byrnes)
- Whole

=== Joint committees ===
- Atomic Energy (Chairman: Rep. Chet Holifield; Vice Chairman: Sen. John O. Pastore)
- Conditions of Indian Tribes (Special)
- Construction of a Building for a Museum of History and Technology for the Smithsonian
- Defense Production (Chairman: Sen. A. Willis Robertson; Vice Chairman: Rep. Wright Patman)
- Disposition of Executive Papers
- Economic (Chairman: Rep. Wright Patman; Vice Chairman: Sen. Paul H. Douglas)
- Immigration and Nationality Policy (Chairman: Rep. Michael A. Feighan)
- Legislative Budget
- The Library (Chairman: Rep. Omar Burleson; Vice Chairman: Sen. B. Everett Jordan)
- Navajo-Hopi Indian Administration
- Organization of Congress
- Printing (Chairman: Sen. Carl Hayden; Vice Chairman: Rep. Omar Burleson)
- Reduction of Nonessential Federal Expenditures (Chairman: Vacant; Vice Chairman: Vacant)
- Taxation (Chairman: Rep. Wilbur D. Mills; Vice Chairman: Sen. Harry F. Byrd)

== Employees ==
=== Legislative branch agency directors ===
- Architect of the Capitol: J. George Stewart
- Attending Physician of the United States Congress: George Calver, until 1966
  - Rufus Pearson, from 1966
- Comptroller General of the United States: Joseph Campbell, until July 31, 1965, vacant thereafter
  - vacant, July 31, 1965 – March 8, 1966
  - Elmer B. Staats, from March 8, 1966
- Librarian of Congress: Lawrence Quincy Mumford
- Public Printer of the United States: James L. Harrison

=== Senate ===
- Chaplain: Frederick Brown Harris (Methodist)
- Parliamentarian: Floyd Riddick
- Secretary: Felton McLellan Johnston, until December 30, 1965
  - Emery L. Frazier, January 1, 1966 – September 30, 1966
  - Francis R. Valeo, from October 1, 1966
- Librarian: Richard D. Hupman
- Democratic Party Secretary: Francis R. Valeo, until 1966
  - J. Stanley Kimmitt, from 1966
- Republican Party Secretary: J. Mark Trice
- Sergeant at Arms: Joseph C. Duke, until December 30, 1965
  - Robert G. Dunphy, from January 14, 1966

=== House of Representatives ===
- Chaplain: Bernard Braskamp (Presbyterian)
- Clerk: Ralph R. Roberts
- Doorkeeper: William M. Miller
- Postmaster: H. H. Morris
- Parliamentarian: Lewis Deschler
- Reading Clerks: Charles W. Hackney Jr. (D) and Joe Bartlett (R)
- Sergeant at Arms: Zeake W. Johnson

== Footnotes ==
- Martis, Kenneth C. (1989). The Historical Atlas of Political Parties in the United States Congress. New York: Macmillan Publishing Company.
- Martis, Kenneth C. (1982). The Historical Atlas of United States Congressional Districts. New York: Macmillan Publishing Company.

== See also ==
- 1964 United States elections (elections leading to this Congress)
  - 1964 United States presidential election
  - 1964 United States Senate elections
  - 1964 United States House of Representatives elections
- 1966 United States elections (elections during this Congress, leading to the next Congress)
  - 1966 United States Senate elections
  - 1966 United States House of Representatives elections
