= Channel Master =

American electronics manufacturer

- Company type: Private
- Industry: Electronics
- Founded: 1949
- Founder: Joseph Y. Resnick
- Headquarters: Chandler, Arizona, United States
- Products: Television Antennas, Amplifiers, Set Top Boxes, and Installation Accessories
- Website: https://www.channelmaster.com/

Channel Master is a manufacturer of TV antennas and accessories that once employed 1,600 people.

== History ==
The original company, now defunct, was founded in Ellenville, New York, in 1949 by 23 year-old former Merchant Marine radio operator and DuMont TV antenna installer Joe Resnick with the backing of his brothers Harry and Louis Resnick. Its principal innovation was a prefabricated antenna which arrived with elements folded, not disassembled, so that the antenna may be quickly unfolded during installation with the elements automatically locking into place. This saved time and effort for rooftop antenna installers, who were often working at awkward heights and in difficult weather.

Established with $7,000 in capital from cabbage farmer Louis Resnick, who sold his Ellenville farm, the company was manufacturing $12 million of antennas annually by 1954 and had expanded its product line in the 1960s to include transistorized pre-amplifiers along with antenna rotors.

The Ellenville plant received aluminum ingots that were extruded to create parts for the antennas. Additionally, the company extruded lengths of aluminum tubing that was wholesaled to firms that utilized it in products such as webbed folding beach chairs. One such firm was Gersten Brothers of Brooklyn, NY.

Joseph Y. Resnick was also a member of the US Congress. The Joseph Y. Resnick Airport in Ellenville is named in his honor.

Avnet Corporation purchased Channel Master in 1967, moving its manufacturing facilities to a former Sylvania television factory in Smithfield, North Carolina. Avnet sold the company in 1998 at a $33 million profit.

Channel Master filed for Chapter 11 bankruptcy protection on 2 October 2003 after losing its largest client, EchoStar. Its Smithfield satellite dish factory, which formerly employed 1,600 people, was turned over to Andrew Corporation as part of an $18 million purchase of Channel Master's equipment, inventory, and intellectual property.

In 2012, a group of private investors led by Coty Youtsey acquired the Channel Master brand and TV antenna business. Channel Master LLC is based in Chandler, Arizona.

== Products ==
Channel Master's original product was a prefabricated television aerial with hinged elements which would unfold and snap into place; this patented design greatly reduced installation time as existing antenna designs at the time had to be bolted together from multiple pieces by rooftop installers. Later products included antenna rotors, amplified antennas and pocket transistor radios, and rebuilt cathode-ray tubes.

After the sale to Avnet, the Channel Master name was used to import and distribute various electronic products, including home and car stereo equipment, turntables, cassette decks, 8-track players, quadraphonic audio, television receivers and scanner radios. In the 1980s, Channel Master was the only second source for General Instrument (GI)'s Videocipher II module, a building block for satellite television receivers, under a licensing agreement for which Avnet paid GI a million dollars. The Channel Master 4251, a high-performance parabolic UHF television antenna, stood about seven feet in diameter. Channel Master also built distribution amplifiers for cable television, satellite dishes and satellite antenna accessories.

== See also ==
- DTVPal
- Log-periodic antenna
