= N89 =

N89 may refer to:

- HMS Upright (N89), a submarine of the Royal Navy
- Joseph Y. Resnick Airport, in Ellenville, New York, United States
- London Buses route N89
- Nebraska Highway 89, in the United States
