= Daniel E. Button =

American politician (1917–2009)

Daniel Evan Button
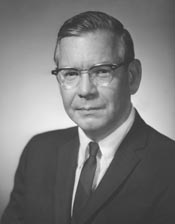

Member of the U.S. House of Representatives from New York's 29th district
- In office January 3, 1967 – January 3, 1971
- Preceded by: Leo W. O'Brien
- Succeeded by: Samuel S. Stratton

Personal details
- Born: November 1, 1917 Dunkirk, New York, U.S.
- Died: March 7, 2009 (aged 91) Delmar, New York, U.S.
- Resting place: Albany Rural Cemetery, Menands, New York
- Party: Republican Party
- Spouse(s): Rebecca Pool; Rena Posner
- Children: 5
- Education: University of Delaware; Columbia University
- Profession: Journalist

Daniel Evan Button (November 1, 1917 – March 7, 2009) was a Republican member of the United States House of Representatives from New York from 1967 to 1971.

A native of Dunkirk, New York, Button graduated from Wilmington High School in Delaware in 1933 and the University of Delaware in 1938. He received a master's degree from Columbia University in 1939. Button worked as a journalist and university public relations representative in Delaware and New York.

In 1966, Button was elected to Congress, and he won reelection in 1968. He was an unsuccessful candidate for reelection in 1970, after which he resumed his journalism career and authored several books.

== Early life ==
Daniel E. Button was born in Dunkirk, New York on 1 November 1917. He graduated from Delaware's Wilmington High School in 1933. In 1938, he received his A.B. degree from the University of Delaware. In 1939, he received his M.A. from Columbia University. He wrote for the Wilmington Morning News and the Associated Press from 1943 until 1947, when he turned to public relations at the University of Delaware. After this, he was assistant to the president of the State University of New York from 1952 until 1958. He was executive editor of the Albany Times-Union from 1960 until 1966.

== Congress ==
Button was elected to Congress in 1966 as a Republican in a heavily Democratic district centered around Albany and Schenectady and served from January 3, 1967, until January 3, 1971. Button first ran for the seat vacated by Democrat Leo W. O'Brien in 1966 and was reelected to a second term in 1968. However, a mid-decade redistricting ahead of the 1970 elections made his district even more heavily Democratic and drew the home of Democratic congressman and former Schenectady mayor Samuel S. Stratton into Button's district. By 1970, he had become an outspoken critic of the Vietnam War. However, this was not enough to overcome the heavy partisan lean of his new district, and he was routed in the general election.

== Later career ==
He was president of the Arthritis Foundation from 1971 to 1975 and editor of the national consumer magazine Science Digest from 1976 to 1980. He wrote a 1965 study of John V. Lindsay, Lindsay: A Man for Tomorrow, and also published Take City Hall about Albany politics (2003). Button also authored a biography of Albany mayor Thomas Michael Whalen III, and wrote editorial's for Delmar's The Spotlight newspaper. From 1994 to 2003 he was executive assistant to the president of the Commission on Independent Colleges and Universities in New York State.

In retirement, Button was a resident of Delmar. He died at Albany Medical Center in Albany, New York on March 7, 2009. Button was buried at Albany Rural Cemetery in Menands, New York, Section 118, Plot 1051.

== Sources ==
- United States Congress. "Daniel E. Button (id: B001201)". Biographical Directory of the United States Congress.

== General Reference ==
- Daniel Evan Button Papers, 1962-1970. M.E. Grenander Department of Special Collections and Archives, University Libraries, University at Albany, State University of New York.

U.S. House of Representatives
Preceded by Leo W. O'Brien	Member of the U.S. House of Representatives from New York's 29th congressional district 1967–1971	Succeeded by Samuel S. Stratton
