= Victor J. Andrew =

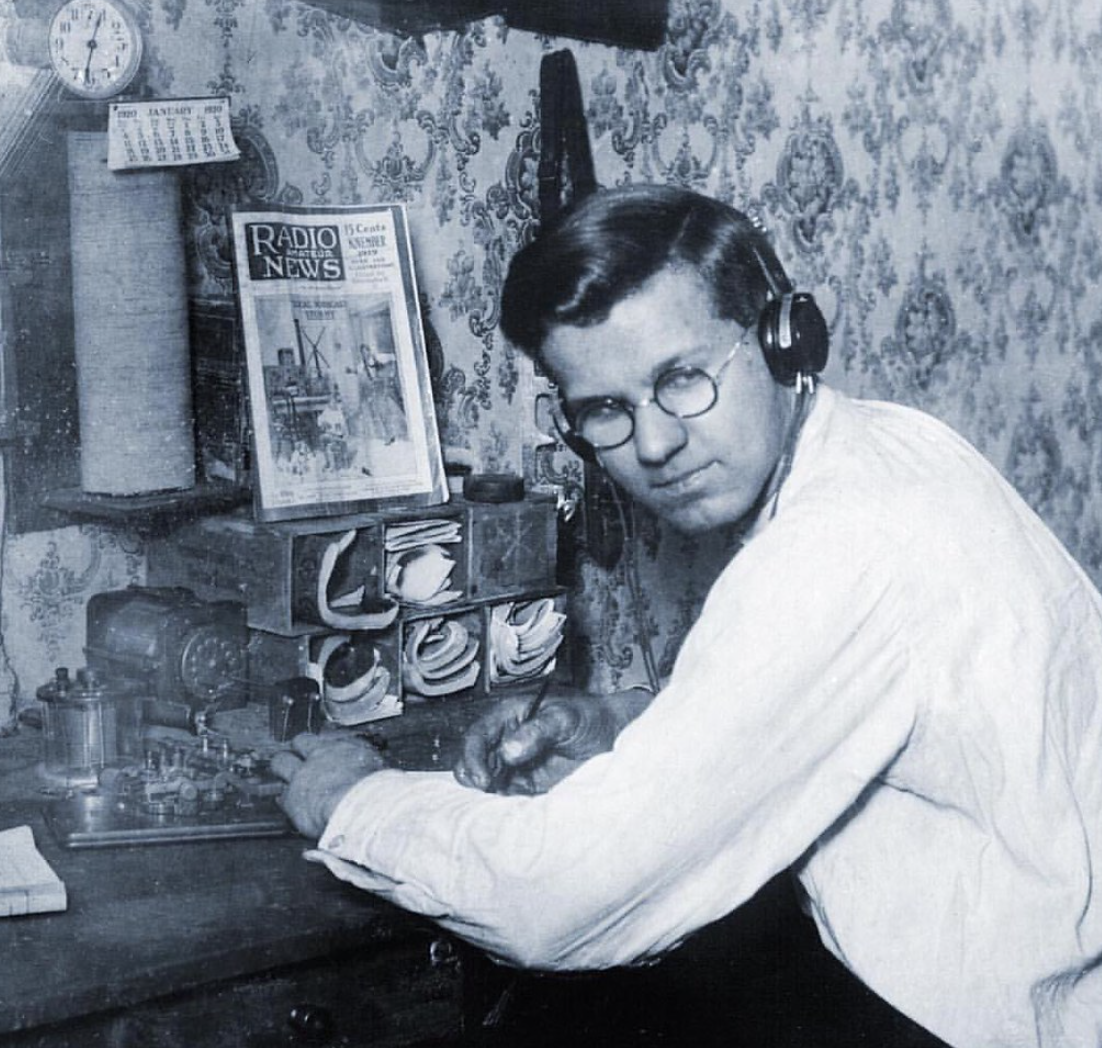
Victor J. Andrew operating a radio station

Victor “Doc” John Andrew (August 31, 1902 - October 30, 1971) was an electrical engineer and the founder of Andrew Corporation, a world-leading telecommunications manufacturing company previously located in Orland Park, Illinois.

== Early life ==
Victor J. Andrew (originally named John Victor Andrew), was born to parents Irving Andrew and Ruby Perkins Andrew in a family farmhouse in Medina County, Ohio. He entered school at the age of six and continued for four years; the last two years being failures to pass the third grade. His mother then took him out of school and educated him herself. She had worked as a schoolteacher in a one-room schoolhouse for eight years before marrying her husband, Irving.

Andrew recalls that his mother didn't specifically require him to study anything, but instead would incorporate lessons on various subjects during everyday life. He states, “The four years I was out of school were primarily playing, usually alone, going a half mile in various directions from home, generally in the rural areas.” He would eventually return to school at the age of fourteen.

In his earlier years, his interest in the physical sciences, particularly the electrical sciences, began to grow. His older cousins were amateur radio operators and had given him radio equipment to experiment with. He would begin to construct things with whatever he could find, such as discarded electrical parts from the city dump. At the age of fifteen, he became the first mobile radio serviceman in Wooster, Ohio. At seventeen, he had his own operating amateur radio station.

== Higher education, employment, and the Great Depression ==
Andrew began his higher education at the College of Wooster. He developed an interest in the fields of mathematics, physics, and economics. From 1923 to 1924, he served as chief engineer of the WABW radio station owned by the college. Since he had already taken all of the math and science courses offered by the College of Wooster, he conducted research in association with the U.S. Naval Research Laboratory in Washington, D.C. on radio wave propagation.

After graduating with a Bachelor of Science in 1926, he moved on to become a junior engineer at the United States Army Signal Corps Laboratories at Fort Monmouth, New Jersey. Although he hated the social values of New Jersey, claiming they were “stuck up”, he soon met his future wife, Aileen Sharkey. After working in Fort Monmouth for fifteen months, he applied for graduate school at the University of Chicago for his master's degree, with the intention of acquiring a PhD.

After he graduated with his master's degree in 1928, he began to look for work, although it was hard to find. He moved to Chicopee Falls, Massachusetts to work for Westinghouse Electric at the firm's x-ray tube facility. This didn't last long, though, as he was let go after the stock market crash on October 29, 1929. Given the opportunity to continue his studies, the couple moved back to Chicago so he would be able to pursue his PhD at the University of Chicago.

After graduating with a PhD in physics in 1932, he began to look for new work. However, he lost two other jobs by 1934 due to the Great Depression. Even though his hope was diminishing, he began to work at Doolittle Radio Inc. With his position undefined and the company rapidly declining, he searched for a way for the company to make more money. After finding the inventions of his predecessors going untouched, he eventually became a salesman, selling these designs. After about two years, he resigned and enrolled in various business courses to prepare for launching his own venture.

== Andrew Corporation ==
The corporation's logo

After leaving his position at Doolittle Radio Inc., Andrew started up the Andrew Company out of the basement of his rented home on January 1, 1937. This was illegal due to zoning laws, but law enforcement often didn't enforce these laws. Andrew Corporation started as both a manufacturing and engineering consulting company. However, with the WWII ban on new station construction, not much consulting was needed, so the Andrew Corporation quickly shifted its focus to manufacturing. Manufacturing for the U.S. military helped the corporation grow in ways it never had when its sole customer base was civilian.

With himself as board chairman and CEO and his wife Aileen as the president of the company, they decided to relocate the company to a south Chicago suburb, Orland Park, so that they would be able to expand more easily. After the war, Andrew began to pursue international trade. He traveled the world to pursue more customers but never lost contact with the original business in Illinois.

== Family ==
Victor and his wife, Aileen, adopted two children: Edward John and Juanita Andrew Hord. Their children accompanied them on business trips as they marketed and expanded the company. His wife Aileen died in 1967 in Australia. He later married his second wife, Rose Metz Andrew in 1969.

== Death ==
Victor J. Andrew died on October 30, 1971, in his home in Claremont, California. He was buried in Orland Memorial Park Cemetery.

== Legacy ==
Aileen and Victor created the Aileen S. Andrew Foundation in 1947. The foundation offers various grants and scholarships.

In 1977, Victor J. Andrew High School in Tinley Park was named after him with the logo being the Thunderbolts to commemorate Andrew Corporation.

Andrew Corporation became a publicly traded company in 1981. In 2007 the Andrew Corporation. was bought out by CommScope for 2.6 billion dollars.
