= J. Ernest Wharton =

American politician

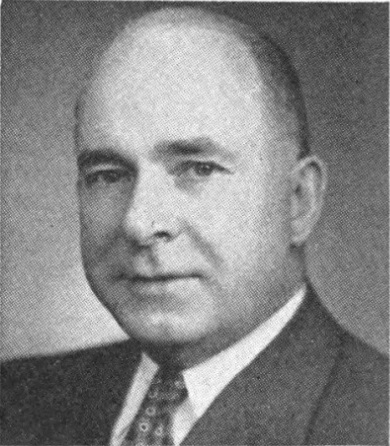
- From 1963's Pocket Congressional Directory of the Eighty-Eighth Congress

Member of the U.S. House of Representatives from New York
- In office January 3, 1951 – January 3, 1965
- Preceded by: Jay Le Fevre
- Succeeded by: Joseph Y. Resnick
- Constituency: 30th district (1951–53); 29th district (1953–63); 28th district (1963–65)

Personal details
- Born: October 4, 1899 Binghamton, New York, U.S.
- Died: January 19, 1990 (aged 90) Summit, New York, U.S.
- Resting place: Cobleskill Rural Cemetery, Cobleskill, New York
- Party: Republican
- Spouse(s): Freda Boynton; Marion Turner
- Children: 1
- Parents: James H. Wharton (father); Mae Dibble (mother)
- Education: Albany Law School
- Profession: Attorney

Military service
- Allegiance: United States
- Branch/service: United States Army
- Years of service: 1918
- Rank: Private
- Unit: Student Army Training Corps
- Battles/wars: World War I

James Ernest Wharton (October 4, 1899 – January 19, 1990) was an American attorney and politician. A Republican, he served as a member of the United States House of Representatives from New York from 1951 to 1965.

== Biography ==
James Ernest Wharton was born in Binghamton, New York on October 4, 1899 to James H. Wharton and Mae Dibble. He attended the public schools of Richmondville and graduated from Richmondville High School. After his high school graduation, Wharton attended Albany Law School.

During World War I, Wharton joined the Student Army Training Corps. He enlisted as a private in October 1918, and was discharged in December, following the Armistice of 11 November 1918 that ended the war. Wharton then completed his studies at Albany Law School, from which he graduated in 1919.

Wharton worked for Travelers Insurance from 1920 until 1929. He attained admission to the bar in 1923 and commenced a law practice in 1929. A Republican, Wharton was the district attorney of Schoharie County, New York from 1932 until 1941. From 1941 to 1951, he served as the county's surrogate, family, and county court judge.

He was elected to the U.S. House in 1950 and served from January 3, 1951, until January 3, 1965. In 1960, his Democratic opponent was Gore Vidal, whom Wharton defeated to win a fifth term. In 1964, he was defeated for reelection by Democrat Joseph Y. Resnick. After leaving Congress, Wharton resumed the practice of law and became involved in real estate development.

Wharton voted in favor of the Civil Rights Acts of 1957, 1960, and 1964, as well as the 24th Amendment to the U.S. Constitution.

He died in Summit, New York on January 19, 1990. He was buried at Cobleskill Rural Cemetery in Cobleskill.

Wharton was first married to Freda Boynton (1899–1979). They divorced and he married Marion Turner (1913–2006). With his first wife, Wharton was the father of a daughter, Beverly Wharton Radez.

U.S. House of Representatives
Preceded by Jay LeFevre	Member of the U.S. House of Representatives from New York's 30th congressional district 1951–1953	Succeeded by Leo W. O'Brien
Preceded by Katharine St. George	Member of the U.S. House of Representatives from New York's 29th congressional district 1953–1963	Succeeded by Leo W. O'Brien
Preceded by Katharine St. George	Member of the U.S. House of Representatives from New York's 28th congressional district 1963–1965	Succeeded by Joseph Y. Resnick
