= DTVPal =

DTVPal logo

The DTVPal was a line of digital-to-analog converter boxes designed by EchoStar Communications, under the Dish Network name. The boxes were marketed starting in 2008.

The units debuted to both love and criticism from purchasers, primarily related to reliability, warranty, and service issues. All models in the line were discontinued. One model, the DTVPal DVR, had unique features in this class of product: the ability to pause live TV and time-shift broadcast TV digitally. This model returned to production in 2010 as the Channel Master model CM 7000PAL.
