= Andrew Corporation =

Manufacturer of hardware for communications networks

- Type: Subsidiary
- Industry: Telecommunications
- Founded: 1937; 89 years ago
- Founder: Victor J. Andrew
- Headquarters: Richardson, Texas, United States
- Key people: C. Russell Cox (president); Edward J. Andrew Sr. (chairman)
- Parent: Amphenol
- Website: www.andrew.com

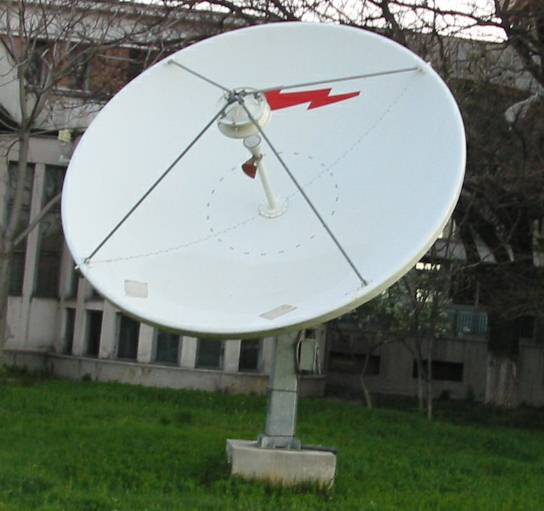
Satellite dish made by Andrew Corporation

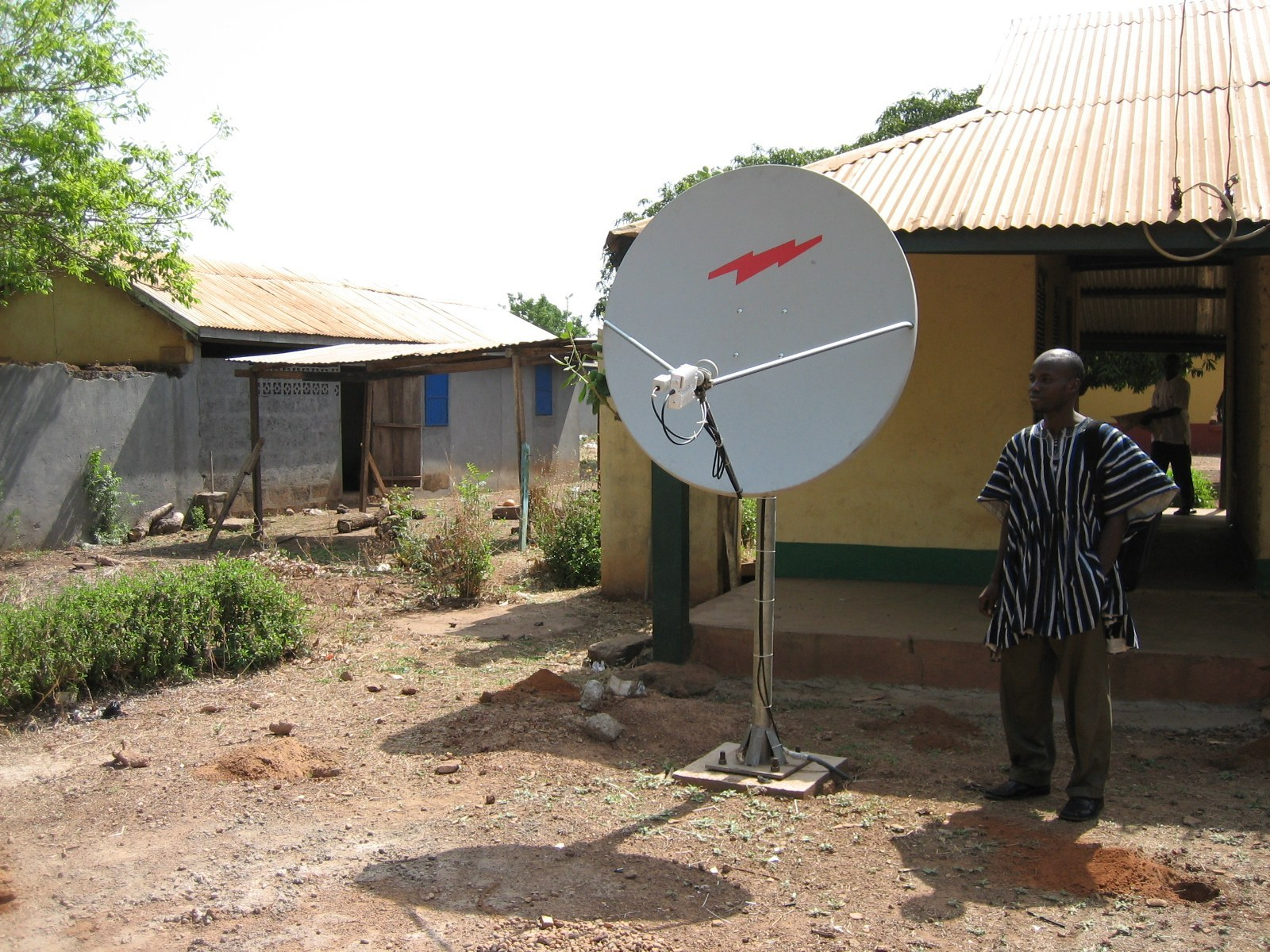
VSAT satellite dish made by Andrew Corporation

Andrew Corporation, a subsidiary of Amphenol headquartered in Richardson, Texas, manufactures hardware for communications networks. Andrew played a significant role in the development of Wireless communication technologies.

Products include antennas, cables, amplifiers, repeaters, transceivers, as well as software and training for the broadband and cellular industries. It has customers in 35 countries across Asia-Pacific, Europe, and the Americas, with manufacturing plants in 12 countries, at one time employing over 4,500 people. Specific product applications include antennas, cables, amplifiers as well as software and training in radio and other Wireless communication systems.

== History ==
The company was founded by Victor J. Andrew in the basement of his Chicago, Illinois bungalow home Francisco Avenue in 1937. The company upgraded to a factory space on 75th Street a few short years later. The 75th Street location was just south of Midway Airport and mainly housed manufacturing plants and factory spaces.

In 1947, Victor J. Andrew and C. Russell Cox (original Andrew employee and future Andrew executive) made the executive decision that the company had outgrown the Chicago space and started inquiring on spaces in the suburbs with seemingly limitless property and business potential.

It further established in Orland Park, Illinois in 1953.

=== Transition to Orland Park ===
After 10 years in their Chicago facility, Andrew Corporation moved operations to Orland Park, Illinois, a suburb about 15 miles south of the 75th Street location. Andrew purchased the 430 acre vacant, unincorporated lot for $200 per acre. The location was strategically chosen for its proximity to the Rock Island and Wabash Metra train lines, as well as its potential for future growth.

A ground-breaking ceremony was held at the Orland Park facility in 1949. The Andrew Orland Park (AOP) location housed the corporate office complex, as well as the 254,000 square foot factory.

Andrew operated through their Orland Park facility from 1948 to 2007, using the location as their global headquarters.

=== Product manufacturing ===
Throughout its existence, Andrew Corporation produced a diverse range of products, each designed to meet the evolving needs of the market. Andrew Corporation provided communications infrastructure for the U.S. Military, as well as expanded the reach of communications technology for everyday people in a wide range of countries.

=== Radio antennas (1937–1970s) ===
In its early years, Andrew Corporation specialized in manufacturing high-quality radio antennas. Founder Victor J. Andrew knew the importance of integrity in radio antennas from his background in amateur radio broadcasting. These antennas were widely used in broadcast and communication systems, enabling long-range transmission and reception of radio signals.

=== Coaxial cables (1940s–1980s) ===
During the mid-20th century, Andrew Corporation became a leading producer of coaxial cables, a crucial component for transmitting high-frequency signals in telecommunications and cable TV systems.

At one point, Andrew Corporation was the principal engineer for Chicago's WBKB TV station, which would later become Chicago's CBS affiliate.

Andrew's coaxial cable technology was acquired by Kabelmetal, a German telecommunications company that worked very closely with Founder Victor J. Andrew. Their cables were known for their exceptional signal integrity and durability.

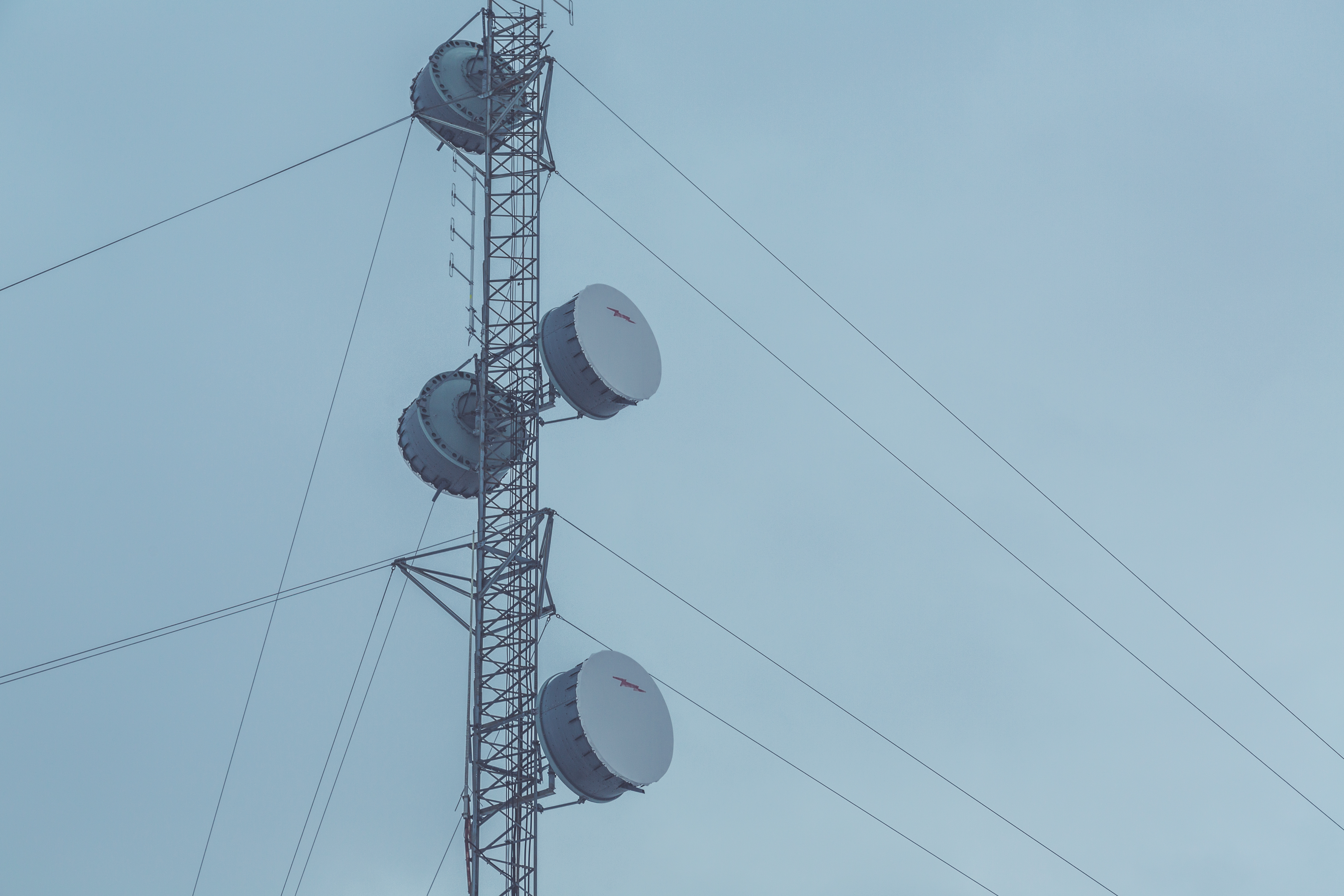
Andrew Microwave Antennas on BNSF Communications Tower (Lafayette, Iowa)

=== Microwave components (1950s–1990s) ===
In the 1950s, Andrew Corporation expanded its product line through manufacturing and acquisitions to include microwave components. These components played a pivotal role in satellite communications, radar systems, and microwave transmission networks, supporting a wide range of applications in the aerospace and defense sectors.

=== Base station antennas (1960s–2000s) ===
As mobile telecommunication networks began to flourish, Andrew Corporation ventured into manufacturing base station antennas in the 1960s. These antennas were essential for providing reliable mobile communication services and enabled the expansion of cellular networks globally.

=== Fiber-optic components (1980s–2000s) ===
With the rise of fiber optic technology, Andrew Corporation shifted its focus to produce a variety of fiber optic components during the 1980s. Their products included fiber optic connectors, couplers, and amplifiers, which contributed to the rapid growth and efficiency of fiber optic communication systems.

In 1986, Andrew acquired Scientific Communications, Inc. (SciComm), and Kintec Corp, further acquiring The Antenna Company in 1996. Andrew acquired Channel Master's Smithfield, North Carolina satellite dish factory, equipment, inventory and intellectual property in an $18 million deal after that firm filed for chapter 11 bankruptcy protection on October 2, 2003.

=== Wireless communication infrastructure (1990s–2007) ===
As wireless communication technologies advanced, Andrew Corporation developed and manufactured various wireless infrastructure products, including tower-mounted amplifiers, base station subsystems, and remote radio heads. These products facilitated the deployment and enhancement of wireless networks worldwide, including infrastructure to sustain wireless positioning systems.

=== International ventures ===
By the late 1990s, the company had major operations in China.

In 2006, the company began base station antenna production in Czech Republic To Serve Europe, Middle East, Africa Region Customers.

In 1995, the company invested in firms in Brazil.

By 1983, the company had operations in Australia.

Andrew's Brazilian manufacturing began in 1976 in Sorocaba. In Brazil, Andrew's manufacturing plants constructed Andrew’s Decibel Base station Antenna, for sale to customers in South America, Central America, and the Caribbean.

Through the Russian joint venture (Metrocom), Andrew laid cable in Russian cities, including projects to sustain the Saint Petersburg Metro, ATM links, and phone service.

In 2007, Andrew Corporation worked to bolster communications infrastructure in the Hong Kong railway.

=== Management reconstruction ===
With Victor J. Andrew's passing in 1971, Andrew Corporation needed to restructure management in a time of corporate culture uncertainty. In the wake of their founder, a Board of Directors was selected of the top company leaders. C. Russell Cox, longtime Andrew employee and friend of Victor, was elected to be Chairman of the Board. The 1971 Andrew Corporation Board of Directors was composed of Edward J. Andrew, Edith Andrew, Juanita Hord, Robert "Bob" Hord, Peter Gianchini, Robert "Bob" Lamons, and William "Bill" Morgan.

In 1980, Andrew Corporation stock was available for public trading, marking a shift in the company from private to public. With this shift in ownership, there was a subsequent shift in management. While Victor J. Andrew was Chairman of the Board, executives and board members were typically promoted internally from other positions in the company. In the years after his passing, many new executives and chairmen were hired externally, having never worked at Andrew Corporation, but with experience in the field of telecommunications from other companies.

In 1986, Edward J. Andrew, son of Victor J. Andrew, became Chairman of the Board of Directors, with Floyd English becoming President and Chief Executive Officer. English then brought two more executives from external companies to become Board Members (Owen Bekkum, George Butzow). In this same year, Juanita and Robert Hord had left the Andrew Board of Directors, opting to focus efforts in the Aileen S. Andrew Foundation

In 1993, Edward J. Andrew left Andrew Corporation.

=== Acquisitions ===
- Allen Telecom: Andrew Corporation acquired Allen Telecom, a leading provider of wireless communications infrastructure and solutions, to expand its presence in the wireless communication industry.
- Celiant Corporation: Andrew Corporation acquired Celiant Corporation, a company specializing in wireless communications systems, to strengthen its position in the mobile communication infrastructure market.
- EMS Wireless: Andrew Corporation acquired EMS Wireless, a provider of wireless network solutions, to enhance its portfolio of wireless communication products and services.
- Other Andrew Corporation acquisitions include Scientific Communications (SciComm), Emerald Technology Inc., Yanti Fine Cable Co., and Chesapeake Microwave Technologies, The Antenna Company, Channel Master, Precision Antennas Ltd., and Nortel.

With the acquisition of SciComm and Kintec Corp., the company was able to obtain U.S. Military contracts for antenna receivers and optical tracking equipment.

=== Merger with CommScope ===
In 2005, the company agreed to an acquisition by ADC Telecommunications for $2 billion. The transaction was mutually terminated in 2006.

In December 2007, the company was acquired by CommScope for $2.6 billion in stock.

Over 120 executive positions in the newly relocated headquarters in Westchester, IL were eliminated.

=== Amphenol Acquisition of CommScope OWN and DAS Businesses ===
In February 2025, Amphenol acquired the Outdoor Wireless Networks and Distributed Antenna Systems businesses of CommScope, including its subsidiary Andrew Corporation, for $2.1 billion in cash.
