= Francis R. Valeo =

American government employee (1916–2006)

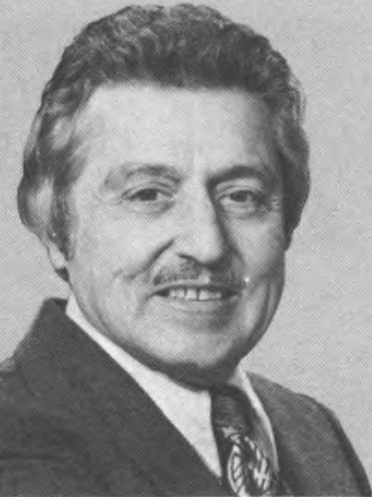
- Valeo in 1977

21st Secretary of the United States Senate
- In office October 1, 1966 – March 31, 1977
- Leader: Mike Mansfield
- Preceded by: Emery L. Frazier
- Succeeded by: Joseph Stanley Kimmitt

Personal details
- Born: Francis Ralph Valeo; January 30, 1916 Brooklyn, New York City, US
- Died: April 9, 2006 (aged 90) Chevy Chase, Maryland, U.S.
- Spouse: Elizabeth Shotwell
- Education: New York University (B.A., M.A.)

Francis Ralph Valeo (January 30, 1916 – April 9, 2006) was an American government employee. He was the secretary of the United States Senate. He was the defendant/appellee for the federal government of the United States in Buckley v. Valeo, 424 U.S. 1 (1976), in which the Supreme Court of the United States upheld federal limits on and disclosure requirements for campaign contributions but struck down limits on campaign and independent expenditures.

== Life ==
Valeo was the son of a shoe factory foreman. He was born in Brooklyn, New York, on January 30, 1916. He was a 1936 political science graduate of New York University, where he also received a master's degree in international relations in 1942. He served in China during World War II.

After the war, he was a foreign policy specialist for the Legislative Reference Service of the Library of Congress, and was loaned to the staff of the Senate Foreign Relations Committee. He traveled repeatedly to Southeast Asia with Montana Senator Mike Mansfield. In 1963, after the Bobby Baker scandal shook the Senate, Mansfield appointed Valeo to replace Baker as Majority Secretary, a position he held during the long filibuster over the Civil Rights Act of 1964. In 1965, he was elected Secretary of the Senate. In 1973, he travelled to Wilmington, Delaware to swear in Joe Biden as a Senator at the Delaware Division of the Wilmington Medical Center. Biden was caring for his two sons following a car crash that killed his wife and infant daughter two weeks earlier.

Valeo's books include The Japanese Diet and the U.S. Congress (1983) and Mike Mansfield, Majority Leader: A Different Kind of Senate, 1961–1976 (1999).

== Sources ==
- Senate Website
- Washington Post Obituary
- Appearances on C-SPAN

Government offices
Preceded by Emery L. Frazier	21st Secretary of the United States Senate; 1966 – 1977	Succeeded by Joseph Stanley Kimmitt
