= Leo W. O'Brien =

American politician from New York state

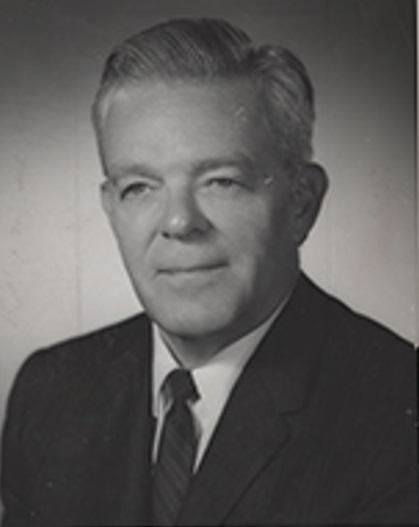
- O'Brien during his final term in 1965

Member of the U.S. House of Representatives from New York
- In office April 1, 1952 – December 30, 1966
- Preceded by: William T. Byrne
- Succeeded by: Daniel E. Button
- Constituency: 32nd district (1952–1953); 30th district (1953–1963); 29th district (1963–1966)

Member of the Port of Albany District Commission
- In office April 30, 1935 – March 27, 1952
- Preceded by: Peter G. Ten Eyck
- Succeeded by: Raymond F. Joyce

Personal details
- Born: Leo William O’Brien; September 21, 1900 Buffalo, New York, U.S.
- Died: May 4, 1982 (aged 81) Albany, New York, U.S.
- Resting place: St. Agnes Cemetery, Menands, New York, U.S.
- Party: Democratic
- Spouse: Mabel C. Jean (m. 1925)
- Children: 1
- Education: Niagara University
- Occupation: Journalist

Leo William O'Brien (September 21, 1900 – May 4, 1982) was an American journalist, radio and television commentator, and politician. A Democrat, he was most notable for his seven terms of service as a member of the United States House of Representatives from New York from 1952 to 1966.

== Early life ==
Nicknamed "Obie," O'Brien was born in Buffalo, New York on 21 September 1900, a son of Patrick O'Brien and Agnes O'Brien. Patrick O'Brien was a Buffalo-area building contractor who later became responsible for construction at Niagara University. Leo O'Brien was a 1918 graduate of Buffalo's St. Joseph's Collegiate Institute and graduated from Niagara University in 1922.

=== Early career ===
O'Brien worked as a newspaper journalist for the International News Service, and Albany Knickerbocker Press and Times-Union. He was active in the Legislative Correspondents' Association and served terms as member of the board of directors, secretary, vice president, and president. O'Brien later became a radio and television commentator. From 1935 to 1952 he was a member of the Port of Albany District Commission.

== Congressman ==
In 1952 he was the successful Democratic nominee for the United States House of Representatives seat left vacant by the death of William T. Byrne. He was reelected seven times and served from April 1, 1952, until resigning on December 30, 1966, a few days before the end of his final term. He was not a candidate for reelection in 1966.

=== Policies ===
As a member of the Committee on Interior and Insular Affairs, O'Brien was a leading advocate for Alaska and Hawaii statehood. He also helped create the Fire Island National Seashore, and strongly advocated cleanup of the Hudson River and protecting it as a scenic waterway.

== Later life ==
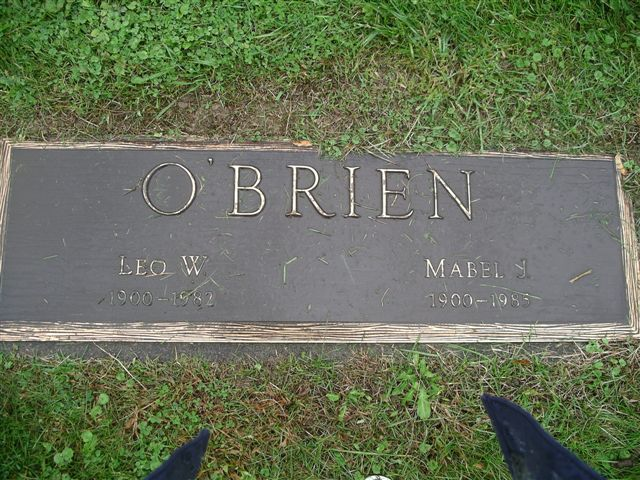
Grave marker at Saint Agnes Cemetery in Menands

After leaving Congress O'Brien served as Chairman of the Albany County Planning Board and the Adirondack Study Commission.

He died at St. Peter's Hospital in Albany, New York on May 4, 1982. He was buried at St. Agnes Cemetery in Menands.

== Family ==
O'Brien married Mabel C. Jean in 1925. They were the parents of a son, Robert.

== Legacy ==
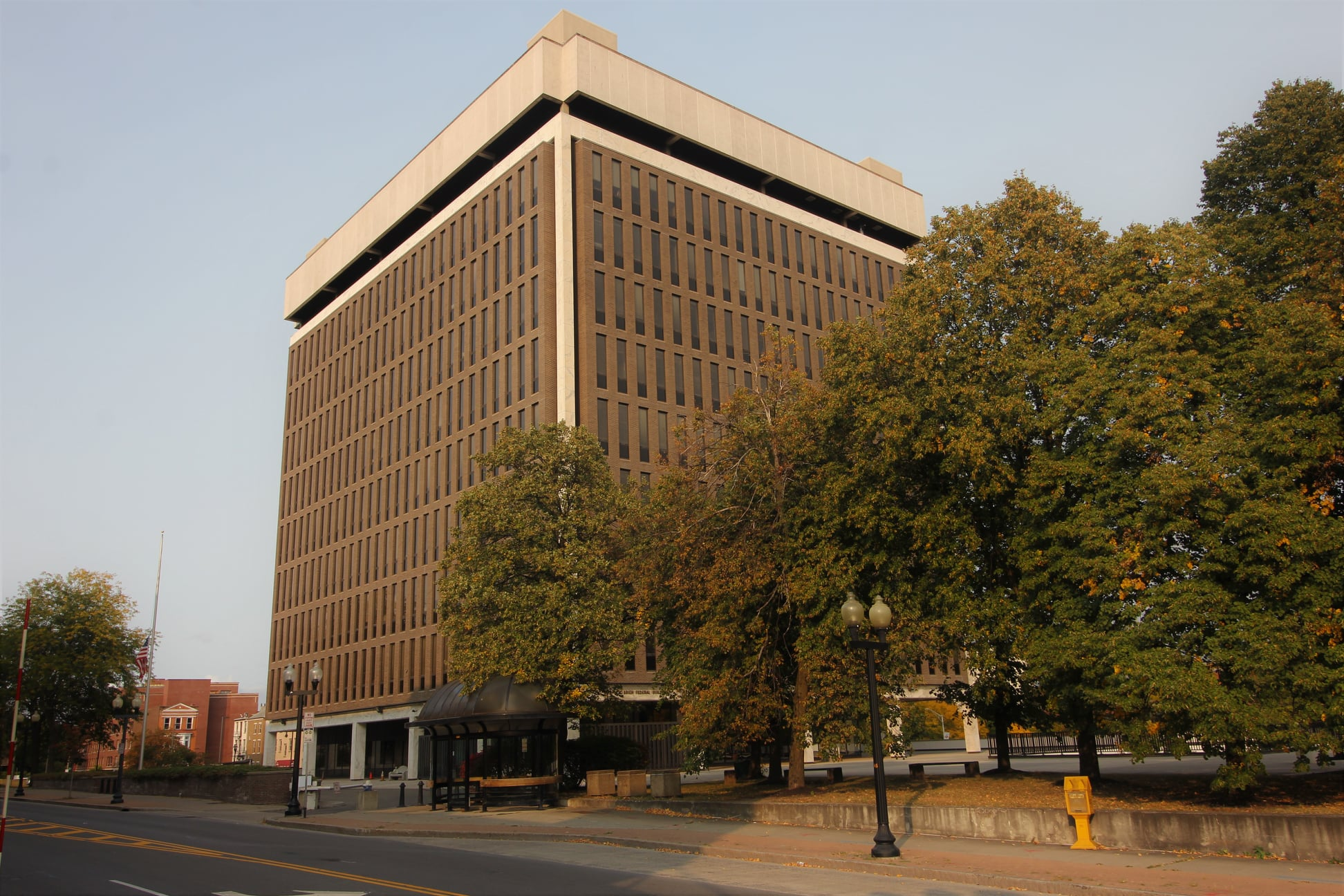
federal building in Albany, named for O'Brien

=== Federal building ===
The United States federal building in Albany, New York is named after for O'Brien. It is located at the corner of Clinton Avenue and North Pearl Street, and contains facilities including a Military Entrance Processing Station (MEPS).

=== Honorary degrees ===
In 1959, O'Brien received the honorary degree of LL.D. from the University of Alaska Fairbanks in recognition of his efforts to promote Alaska statehood. In 1960, O'Brien received an honorary Doctor of Letters degree from Niagara University.

In 1961, he received an honorary LL.D. from Siena College. In May 1966, O'Brien received an honorary Doctor of Humane Letters degree from the Albany College of Pharmacy.

=== Other ===
In April 1951, O'Brien was one of 20 journalists nationwide whose excellence in reporting was recognized with the Sigma Delta Chi Award.

As additional recognition of his Alaska statehood efforts, in 1964 the state government named Mount Terrance, a mountain near Haines, Alaska after O'Brien's 10-year-old grandson.

U.S. House of Representatives
Preceded by William T. Byrne	Member of the U.S. House of Representatives from New York's 32nd congressional district 1952–1953	Succeeded by Bernard W. Kearney
Preceded by J. Ernest Wharton	Member of the U.S. House of Representatives from New York's 30th congressional district 1953–1963	Succeeded by Carleton J. King
Preceded by J. Ernest Wharton	Member of the U.S. House of Representatives from New York's 29th congressional district 1963–1966	Succeeded by Daniel E. Button
