= Emery L. Frazier =

American politician (1896–1973)

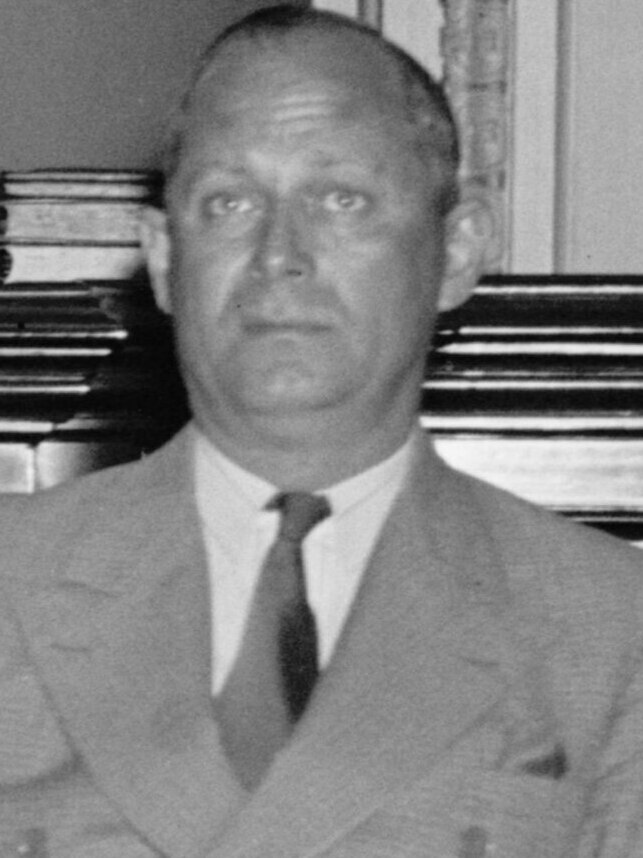
- Frazier in 1937

20th Secretary of the United States Senate
- In office January 1, 1966 – September 30, 1966
- Leader: Mike Mansfield
- Preceded by: Felton M. Johnston
- Succeeded by: Francis R. Valeo

Member of the Kentucky House of Representatives from the 45th district
- In office January 1, 1922 – January 1, 1924
- Preceded by: Benjamin L. Cox
- Succeeded by: William M. Duncan

Personal details
- Born: September 24, 1896 Railey Station, Kentucky, U.S.
- Died: April 24, 1973 (aged 76)
- Education: University of Kentucky

Emery L. Frazier (September 24, 1896 – April 24, 1973) was a Kentucky politician who served as secretary of the United States Senate.

== Early life ==
Born in Railey Station in Woodford County, Kentucky, he interrupted his studies at the University of Kentucky in 1917 to enlist in the Army. After serving during World War I, he completed his degree and was admitted to the Kentucky Bar in 1921.

== Career ==
He was elected to the Kentucky House of Representatives in 1922, later served as reading clerk of the House, and was elected mayor of the City of Whitesburg.

Frazier was reading clerk for the Democratic National Convention in 1932, when he followed his friend, Senator Alben W. Barkley, to Washington, D.C. There, Frazier was appointed legislative clerk of the Senate that year and served until 1948, when he was appointed Chief Clerk of the Senate. Frazier ascended to Secretary of the U.S. Senate on January 1, 1966, the twentieth person to hold that title, and he served for nine months before leaving the office and being appointed by the Senate to work on a history of the body. Frazier continued that work until 1970, when he retired because of illness.

Political offices
Preceded by Benjamin L. Cox	Member of the Kentucky House of Representatives from the 45th district 1922 – 1924	Succeeded by William M. Duncan
Government offices
Preceded by Felton M. Johnston	20th Secretary of the United States Senate; 1966	Succeeded by Francis R. Valeo
