= Joseph Y. Resnick =

American politician

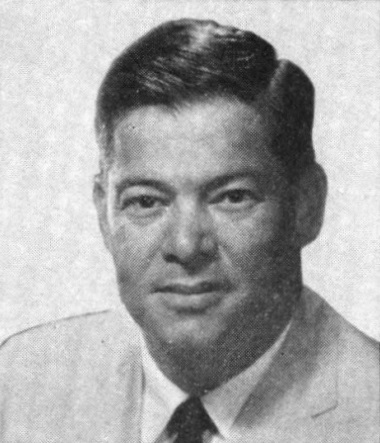

Member of the U.S. House of Representatives from New York's 28th district
- In office January 3, 1965 – January 3, 1969
- Preceded by: J. Ernest Wharton
- Succeeded by: Hamilton Fish IV

Personal details
- Born: Joseph Yale Resnick; July 13, 1924 Ellenville, New York, U.S.
- Died: October 6, 1969 (aged 45) Las Vegas, Nevada, U.S.
- Party: Democratic
- Spouse: Ruth Lehrer
- Occupation: Businessman

Military service
- Allegiance: United States of America
- Branch/service: United States Merchant Marine
- Battles/wars: World War II

Joseph Yale Resnick (July 13, 1924 – October 6, 1969) was an American inventor, World War II veteran and Democratic member of the United States House of Representatives from New York for the 28th congressional district. He served two terms from 1965 to 1969.

== Early life and career ==
Resnick was born in Ellenville, New York, the son of Anna (Zaida) and Morris Resnick. He served as a radio officer in the United States Merchant Marine in World War II. He also helped found Channel Master, which became a leading producer of television antennas after Resnick invented an antenna which was inexpensive, easy to assemble and install, and did not require the expertise of a specially trained technician. He was also the inventor of the first TV antenna that improved reception by rotating towards the direction of the broadcast signal. Before winning election to Congress Resnick served on the Ellenville school board. By 1955, he and his brothers were millionaires, and their radio enterprises became a business empire worth about $45 million.

== Tenure in Congress ==
Resnick was elected to Congress in 1964 from New York's 28th congressional district, a heavily Republican district, defeating 14-year Republican incumbent J. Ernest Wharton. He served from January 3, 1965 until January 3, 1969. During his tenure in Congress, Resnick took on the American Farm Bureau Federation and a Resnick aide subsequently wrote a book on the subject. He was a champion of civil rights and also supported the Vietnam War.

He played a central role in passing the Animal Welfare Act of 1966, which empowered the United States Department of Agriculture (USDA) to protect and regulate the use of animals in research facilities.

He unsuccessfully sought the Democratic nomination for a seat in the United States Senate in 1968, finishing third behind New York City councilman Paul O'Dwyer and Nassau County executive Eugene Nickerson. Resnick's seat in the House was filled by Hamilton Fish IV, whom Resnick had defeated in the 1966 election.

== Death and legacy ==
Resnick was found dead in a Las Vegas, Nevada hotel room on October 6, 1969. The cause of death was ruled to be a myocardial infarction. He was buried at the Hebrew Aid Society Cemetery in Wawarsing, New York.

The Joseph Y. Resnick Airport in Resnick's hometown of Ellenville, Ulster County, is named for him.

== See also ==
- List of Jewish members of the United States Congress

U.S. House of Representatives
Preceded by J. Ernest Wharton	Member of the U.S. House of Representatives from New York's 28th congressional district 1965–1969	Succeeded by Hamilton Fish IV
