= Joseph Y. Resnick Airport =

- IATA: none; ICAO: none; FAA LID: N89

Summary
- Airport type: Public
- Owner: Town of Wawarsing
- Operator: Alfred Perry
- Serves: Ellenville
- Location: 199 Airport Road, Ellenville, New York 12428
- Elevation AMSL: 292 ft (89 m)
- Coordinates: 41°43′40″N 074°22′38″W
- Website: Town of Wawarsing Website
- Interactive map of Joseph Y. Resnick Airport

Runways
Direction	Length		Surface
Direction	ft	m	Surface
4/22	3,838	1,170	Asphalt

Statistics (2014)
- Aircraft operations: 5900
- Based aircraft: 32
- Source: Federal Aviation Administration

Joseph Y. Resnick Airport (FAA LID: N89), is located in Ellenville, New York, United States.

== Facilities and aircraft ==
It is situated one mile northeast of the central business district, and contains one runway. The runway, 4/22, is of asphalt and measures 3,838 ft × 75 ft (1,170 m × 23 m).

The airport currently has "tie-down" spaces to rent and has aviation fuel available for purchase.

For the 12-month period ending May 15, 2014, the airport had approximately, 6328 aircraft operations, an average of 113 per week: 85% local general aviation, 14% transient general aviation, and 2% air taxi. At that time, there were 32 aircraft based at the airport: 31 single-engine and 1 multi-engine.

== History ==
The airport was constructed in 1968. It is named after Joseph Yale Resnick, a member of the U.S. House of Representatives who served from January 3, 1965, until January 3, 1969. In 1988, the town of Wawarsing purchased the airport with the assistance of federal and state funding. It is still currently operated by the town of Wawarsing.

== See also ==
- List of airports in New York
