= National Appliance Energy Conservation Act =

- Long title: An Act to amend the Energy Policy and Conservation Act with respect to energy conservation standards for appliances.
- Acronyms (colloquial): NAECA
- Nicknames: National Appliance Energy Conservation Act of 1987
- Enacted by: the 100th United States Congress
- Effective: March 17, 1987

Citations
- Public law: 100-12
- Statutes at Large: 101 Stat. 103

Codification
- Titles amended: 42 U.S.C.: Public Health and Social Welfare
- U.S.C. sections amended: 42 U.S.C. ch. 77 § 6201 et seq.; 42 U.S.C. ch. 77, subch. III § 6291 et seq.

Legislative history
- Introduced in the Senate as S. 83 by J. Bennett Johnston, Jr. (D–LA) on January 6, 1987; Committee consideration by Senate Energy and Natural Resources, House Energy and Commerce; Passed the Senate on February 17, 1987 (89-6); Passed the House on March 3, 1987 (passed voice vote, in lieu of H.R. 87); Signed into law by President Ronald Reagan on March 17, 1987

Major amendments
- Energy Policy Act of 1992; Energy Policy Act of 2005

The National Appliance Energy Conservation Act of 1987 (NAECA; Pub. L. 100–12, 101 Stat. 103, enacted March 17, 1987) is a United States Act of Congress that regulates energy consumption of specific household appliances. Though minimum Energy Efficiency Standards were first established by the United States Congress in Part B of Title III of the Energy Policy and Conservation Act (EPCA), those standards were then amended by the National Appliance Energy Conservation Act of 1987, the Energy Policy Act of 1992 and the Energy Policy Act of 2005.

All of these laws and regulations have to do with creating mandatory standards that deal with the energy efficiency of certain household appliances. These standards were put in place to ensure that manufacturers were building products that are at the maximum energy efficiency levels are that are technically feasible and economically justified.

== History ==
The National Appliance Energy Conservation Act of 1975 (NAECA) was enacted to help create uniform appliance efficiency standards at a time when individual states were creating their own standards. The NAECA established a conservation program for major household appliances, however no real standards came into existence until the 1980s when appliance manufacturers realized it was easier to conform to a uniform federal standard than individual state standards.

The National Appliance Energy Conservation Act of 1987 amended the Energy Policy and Conservation Act and was introduced and supported by democratic Senator Bennett Johnston, Jr. from Louisiana in January 1987. The new amendments to the act established minimum efficiency standards for many household appliances, including:

- Refrigerators
- Refrigerator-Freezers
- Freezers
- Room Air Conditioner
- Fluorescent Lamp Ballasts
- Incandescent Reflector Lamps
- Clothes Dryers
- Clothes Washers
- Dishwashers
- Kitchen Ranges and Ovens
- Pool Heaters
- Television Sets (withdrawn in 1995)
- Water Heaters

Congress set the initial efficiency standards at the start of the act then set a schedule for the United States Department of Energy to review them. The act also put into place laws prohibiting manufacturers from making any representations about the energy efficiency of any product on this list without first being tested by Federal testing procedure, and disclosing the results of such tests. Lastly the new act set new rules for when state regulations will be superseded by federal regulations in regard to testing and labeling requirements, and energy conservation standards.
