= Energy Conservation Program for Consumer Products =

The Energy Conservation Program for Consumer Products Other Than Automobiles (42 U.S.C. §§ 6291–6309) is a regulatory program that enforces minimum energy conservation standards for appliances and equipment in the United States. The program was established under Part B of Title III of the Energy Policy and Conservation Act of 1975 and gives the Department of Energy (DOE) the authority to develop and implement test procedures and minimum standards for more than 60 products covering residential, commercial and industrial, lighting, and plumbing applications. The Department of Energy is required to set standards that are "technologically feasible and economically justified."

== Statutory authority ==
The program was established by Part B of Title III of the Energy Policy and Conservation Act of 1975 (EPCA) and has been subsequently amended by the National Energy Conservation Policy Act, National Appliance Energy Conservation Act, National Appliance Energy Conservation Amendments of 1988, Energy Policy Act of 1992, Energy Policy Act of 2005 and Energy Independence and Security Act of 2007. As established by NEPA, the program established "test procedures, labeling, and energy targets for consumer products." The National Energy Conservation Policy Act of 1978 directed the DOE to set minimum efficiency levels for thirteen appliances. Subsequent amendments have expanded the number of appliances under regulatory control and directed DOE to maintain a schedule for review and update of testing procedures and minimum efficiency standards.

== Process rule ==
Since 1996, the Department of Energy has followed the Process rule for issuing new or revised efficiency standards or test procedures. Under the Process Rule, DOE solicits inputs from "manufacturers, energy-efficiency advocates, trade associations, state agencies, utilities, and other interested parties" through notices of advanced rulemaking. DOE also performs engineering analysis, life-cycle cost and payback period analysis, uncertainty and variability analyses, sub-population analysis, utility analysis, and environmental impact to establish the maximum standard that is technologically feasible and economically justified. Based on outside feedback and internal analyses, DOE sets the final efficiency rules of testing standards, which are published in the Federal Register.

== Regulated equipment ==
As currently implemented the Energy Conservation Program affects over 60 appliances, including residential, commercial and industrial, lighting, and plumbing products. Regulated residential products include clothes dryers, clothes washers, central air conditioners and heat pumps, ceiling fans, battery chargers and external power supplies, dehumidifiers, heating equipment, dishwashers, kitchen ranges and ovens, microwaves, pool heaters, refrigerators and freezers, furnace fans, furnaces and boilers, room air conditioners, set-top boxes, televisions, and water heaters. Regulated commercial and industrial products include ice makers, clothes washer, air conditioners and heat pumps, pumps, refrigerated beverage vending machines, unit heaters, walk-in coolers and freezers, fans and lowers, warm air furnaces, boilers, refrigeration equipment, water heaters, computer room air conditioners, distribution transformers, electric motors, and compressors. Regulated lighting equipment include ceiling fan light kits, certain lamps, fluorescent lamp ballasts, fluorescent lamps, incandescent lamps, high-intensity discharge lamps, exit sign lamps, incandescent reflector lamps, LED lamps, luminaires, compact fluorescent lamps, metal halide lamp fixtures, torchieres, and traffic signals. Regulated plumbing products include faucets, shower heads, urinals, flush toilets, and commercial prerinse spray valves.

== Appliance labeling ==
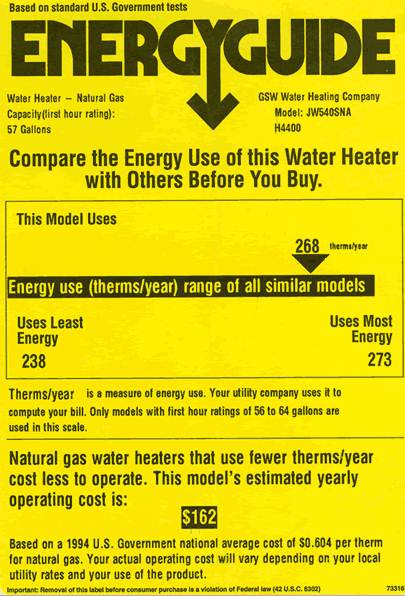
A common Energyguide label

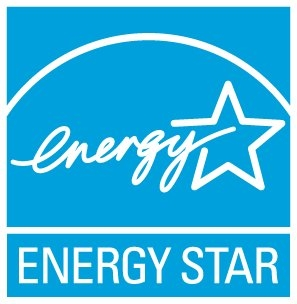
Look for this Energystar logo for more efficient appliances

In order for consumers to better understand the different energy efficiencies and cost associated with appliance options, appliances must be labeled to give consumers this information. The appliances that must have this label are Ceiling Fans, Showerheads, Faucets, Water Closets, Urinals, Room Air Conditioners, Water Heaters (all types), Pool Heaters, Furnaces and Boilers, Clothes Washers, Freezers, Refrigerator-Freezers, Refrigerators, Heat Pumps, Central Air Conditioners, Dishwashers, and various types of lamps. The label must show the model number, the size, key features, and display largely a graph showing the annual operating cost in range with similar models, and the estimated yearly energy cost.

The Energy Policy Act of 1992 called for new rules to be made for required and voluntary labeling programs. This spawned the creation of the Energy Guide label and the Energy Star Label.

Using standard test procedures developed by the United States Department of Energy, manufacturers must prove the energy use and efficiency of their product. Test results are printed on a yellow EnergyGuide Label, which manufacturers are required to display on their appliances. The label shows:

- How much energy the appliance uses
- compares the energy use to similar products
- lists approximate annual operating costs

Energy Star is a similar labeling program, but requires more stringent efficiency standards for an appliance to become qualified, and is not a required program, but a voluntary one. Essentially, an Energy Star label shows that the appliance you have chosen uses less energy and will save you more money than its non-energy star rated competitor.

== Effects of the Energy Conservation Program for Consumer Products ==
=== Economic benefits ===
Appliance energy standards address three market failures that would cause them to be biased toward purchasing more energy intensive appliances. First, low electricity rates cause some consumers to not mind running appliances that are not efficient. Second consumers tend to underestimate the future rate of electricity, thereby underestimating the full lifetime cost of their appliance purchases. Consumers evaluating appliance lifecycle cost tend to use discount rates that are too high which distorts the savings received from using a more efficient appliance. All three of these market failures combine to distort consumers decisions toward purchasing appliances that are less energy efficient than socially desirable. These standards fix these failures by eliminating appliances that are less energy efficient than the standard from the market.

By mandating appliances use electricity more efficiently consumers have gotten better appliances that require less energy to get the same if not more performance. By reducing the electricity required to run appliances consumers have saved tremendous amounts of money since 1975. In many cases the price of these more efficient appliances has not increased compared to previous less efficient models. A great example of this is refrigerators.

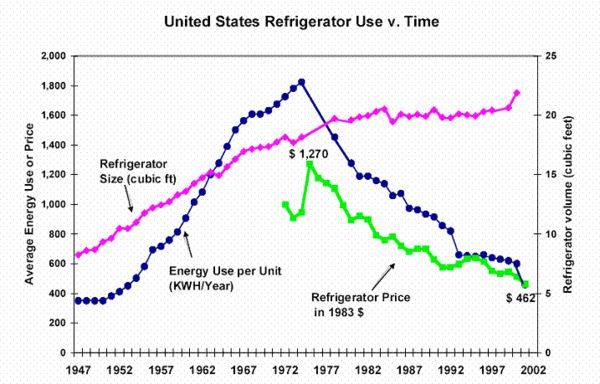

The graph above shows refrigerator use in the United States from 1947 until 2002. Before the National Appliance Energy Act of 1975 refrigerators were getting larger in size and using more and more electricity per unit. After 1975 the trend of refrigerator size increasing continued but dramatically after 1975 the electrical use per unit began to decline as a result of the Act. Also importantly after 1975 the price of refrigerators began to decline. So immediately following this Act consumers in the United States began to get larger refrigerators the use less electricity and cost less per unit. Appliances like refrigerators are essentially always running so these energy improvements since 1975 have saved tremendous amounts of electricity over time. This creates lower utility bills for consumers which allows them to spend their money elsewhere. A refrigerator sold today uses about 70% less electricity as one sold in 1970.

It has been estimated that these standards have saved American taxpayers over $300 Billion in energy savings. Overall these standards have reduced total American energy use by 3.6%, or about 3.6 quadrillion BTU"s every year. Due to the fact that Americans have billions of more dollars every year to reinvest into other sectors of the economy, which they otherwise would not have had without these standards, millions of jobs have been created. It is estimated that these energy savings supported 340,000 American jobs in 2010. The electricity industry does not support a lot of jobs compared to the amount of revenue it takes in. So, when people reinvest their energy savings into other sectors of the economy that support more jobs per dollar of revenue, jobs are created. These 340,000 jobs created by energy standards represent 0.2% of American jobs a small but beneficial percentage.

=== Environmental benefits ===
The majority of electrical power generation, in the United States, comes from combustion of fossil fuels, which releases carbon dioxide and other pollutants into the atmosphere. 45% of power generation comes from coal, 23% from natural gas, and 1% from petroleum. This totals to about 70% of American electrical consumption being produced from fossil fuels. In the previous section it was discussed that in 2010 3.6 quadrillion BTU's were saved by from the implementation of energy standards. This equates to about 2.52 quadrillion BTU's of energy produced from fossil fuels being abated every year because of these performance standards, or 750,000,000,000 kWh. Production of electricity from coal creates 2.095 pounds of carbon dioxide per kWh, from natural gas 1.321 pounds of carbon dioxide per kWh, and from petroleum 1.969 pounds of carbon dioxide per kWh. This equates to about 500 million tons of carbon dioxide from coal, 160 million tons of carbon dioxide from natural gas, and 10 million tons of carbon dioxide from petroleum. For a total of about 670 million tons of carbon dioxide emissions abated in 2010 alone because of these energy performance standards. Other environmentally degrading emission include sulfur and nitrogen oxides which contribute to acid rain. These emissions are mitigated by energy standards the same way carbon dioxide is as previously shown.
