= NECPA =

NECPA may refer to:

- National Emergency Command Post Afloat, part of the United States government's continuity of government plans during the 1960s
- National Energy Conservation Policy Act, a United States statute which enacted as part of the National Energy Act
