= 95th United States Congress =

1977–1979 U.S. Congress

←	94th	96th	→
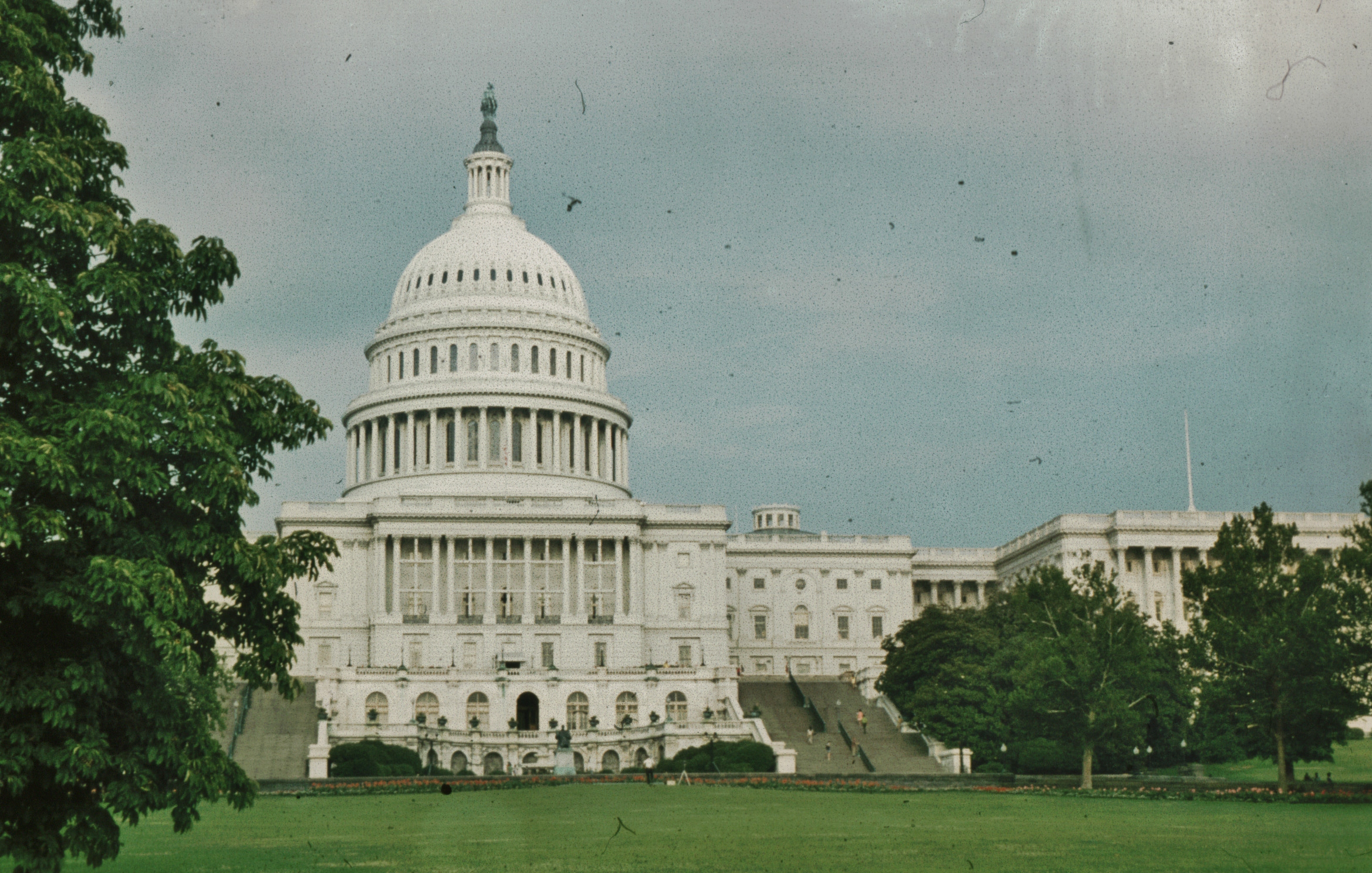
- United States Capitol (c. 1970)

Overview
- Legislative body: United States Congress
- Jurisdiction: United States
- Term: January 3, 1977 – January 3, 1979

Senate
- Members: 100
- President: Nelson Rockefeller (R) (Note: U.S. Vice President Nelson Rockefeller's term as President of the Senate ended at noon January 20, 1977, when Walter Mondale's term began.) (until January 20, 1977); Walter Mondale (D) (from January 20, 1977)
- President pro tempore: James Eastland (D)
- Party control: Democratic

House of Representatives
- Members: 435 representatives 5 non-voting delegates
- Speaker: Tip O'Neill (D)
- Party control: Democratic

Sessions
- 1st: January 4, 1977 – December 15, 1977
- 2nd: January 19, 1978 – October 15, 1978

The 95th United States Congress was a meeting of the legislative branch of the United States federal government, composed of the United States Senate and the United States House of Representatives. It met in Washington, D.C., from January 3, 1977, to January 3, 1979, during the final weeks of Gerald Ford's presidency and the first two years of Jimmy Carter's presidency.

The apportionment of seats in this House of Representatives was based on the 1970 United States census. Both chambers maintained a Democratic supermajority, and with Jimmy Carter being sworn in as president on January 20, 1977, this gave the Democrats an overall federal government trifecta for the first time since the 90th Congress ending in 1969.

As of 2022, this was the most recent Congress to approve an amendment (the unratified District of Columbia Voting Rights Amendment) to the Constitution. This is the last time the Democratic Party or any political party held a 2/3 supermajority in the House.

This is the last congress to at any point have no female senators (from its beginning, January 3, 1977, until the swearing-in of Muriel Humphrey (D-MN) on January 25, 1978; and again from the departure of both Humphrey and Maryon Allen (D-AL) on November 7, 1978, to the early swearing-in of Nancy Kassebaum (R-KS) on December 23, 1978).

== Major events ==
- 1977 was the last year to have men serving as all 100 U.S senators
- January 20, 1977: Inauguration of President Jimmy Carter
- July 13, 1977: New York City blackout of 1977
- January 1, 1978: The Northern Mariana Islands left the Trust Territory of the Pacific Islands to become a Commonwealth of the United States, making it unincorporated and organized.
- February 8, 1978: Senate proceedings are broadcast on radio for the first time.
- August 7, 1978: Love Canal Disaster
- September 17, 1978: Camp David Accords
- November 18, 1978: Representative Leo Ryan is shot and killed by members of the Peoples Temple in Guyana, shortly before the Jonestown massacre.

== Hearings ==
- Project MKULTRA – (Church Committee, Senate Select Committee on Intelligence, Senate Human Resources subcommittee on Health and Scientific Research)

== Major legislation ==
- May 13, 1977: Economic Stimulus Appropriations Act of 1977, Pub. L. 95–29, 91 Stat. 122
- August 3, 1977: Surface Mining Control and Reclamation Act of 1977, Pub. L. 95–87, 91 Stat. 445
- August 4, 1977: Department of Energy Organization Act of 1977, Pub. L. 95–91, 91 Stat. 565
- September 29, 1977: Food and Agriculture Act of 1977, Pub. L. 95–113, 91 Stat. 913
- October 7, 1977: Earthquake Hazards Reduction Act of 1977, Pub. L. 95–124, 91 Stat. 1098
- October 12, 1977: Community Reinvestment Act, Pub. L. 95–128, title VIII, 91 Stat. 1147
- November 23, 1977: Saccharin Study and Labeling Act of 1977, Pub. L. 95–203, 91 Stat. 1451
- December 27, 1977: Clean Water Act, Pub. L. 95–217, 91 Stat. 1566
- December 28, 1977: International Emergency Economic Powers Act, Pub. L. 95–223, title II, 91 Stat. 1626
- March 10, 1978: Nuclear Non-Proliferation Act of 1978, Pub. L. 95–242, 92 Stat. 120
- October 10, 1978: Susan B. Anthony Dollar Coin Act of 1979, Pub. L. 95–447, 92 Stat. 1072
- October 12, 1978: Inspector General Act of 1978, Pub. L. 95–452, 92 Stat. 1101
- October 13, 1978: Civil Service Reform Act, Pub. L. 95–454, 92 Stat. 1111
- October 24, 1978: Airline Deregulation Act, Pub. L. 95–504, 92 Stat. 1705
- October 25, 1978: Foreign Intelligence Surveillance Act, Pub. L. 95–511, 92 Stat. 1783
- October 26, 1978: Ethics in Government Act, Pub. L. 95–521, 92 Stat. 1824
- October 27, 1978: Humphrey-Hawkins Full Employment Act, Pub. L. 95–523, 92 Stat. 1887
- October 31, 1978: Pregnancy Discrimination Act, Pub. L. 95–555, 92 Stat. 2076
- November 1, 1978: Contract Disputes Act, Pub. L. 95–563, 92 Stat. 2383
- November 4, 1978: Solar Photovoltaic Energy Research, Development, and Demonstration Act of 1978, Pub. L. 95–590, 92 Stat. 2513
- November 6, 1978: Bankruptcy Act of 1978, Pub. L. 95–598, 92 Stat. 2549
- November 8, 1978: Indian Child Welfare Act, Pub. L. 95–608, 92 Stat. 3069
- November 8, 1978: Amateur Sports Act of 1978 Pub. L. 95–606, 92 Stat. 3045
- November 9, 1978: National Energy Conservation Policy Act, Pub. L. 95–619, 92 Stat. 3206

== Constitutional amendments ==
- August 22, 1978: Approved an amendment to the United States Constitution granting the District of Columbia full representation in the United States Congress, full representation in the Electoral College system, and full participation in the process by which the Constitution is amended, and submitted it to the state legislatures for ratification
  - This amendment, commonly known as the District of Columbia Voting Rights Amendment, was later rendered inoperative, as it was not ratified within the seven–year time frame set by Congress.

== Treaties ratified ==
- March 16, 1978: First of the Torrijos-Carter Treaties (Panama Canal) treaty: "The Treaty Concerning the Permanent Neutrality and Operation of the Panama Canal", commonly known as the "Neutrality Treaty"
- April 19, 1978: Second of the Torrijos-Carter Treaties treaty, commonly known as "The Panama Canal Treaty"

== Party summary ==
=== Senate ===
Party standings on the opening day of the 95th Congress 61 Democratic senators 1 Independent senator, caucusing with Democrats 38 Republican senators

	Party (shading shows control)				Total	Vacant
	Conservative (C)	Democratic (D)	Independent (I)	Republican (R)	Total	Vacant
End of previous congress	1	60	1	38	100	0
Begin	0	61	1	38	100	0
End	0	58	1	41	100	0
Final voting share	0.0%	58.0%	1.0%	41.0%		
Beginning of next congress	0	58	1	41	100	0

=== House of Representatives ===
	Party (shading shows control)		Total	Vacant
	Democratic (D)	Republican (R)	Total	Vacant
End of previous congress	287	146	433	2
Begin	292	143	435	0
End	275	141	416	19
Final voting share	66.1%	33.9%		
Beginning of next congress	276	157	433	2

== Leadership ==
=== Senate ===
Senate President

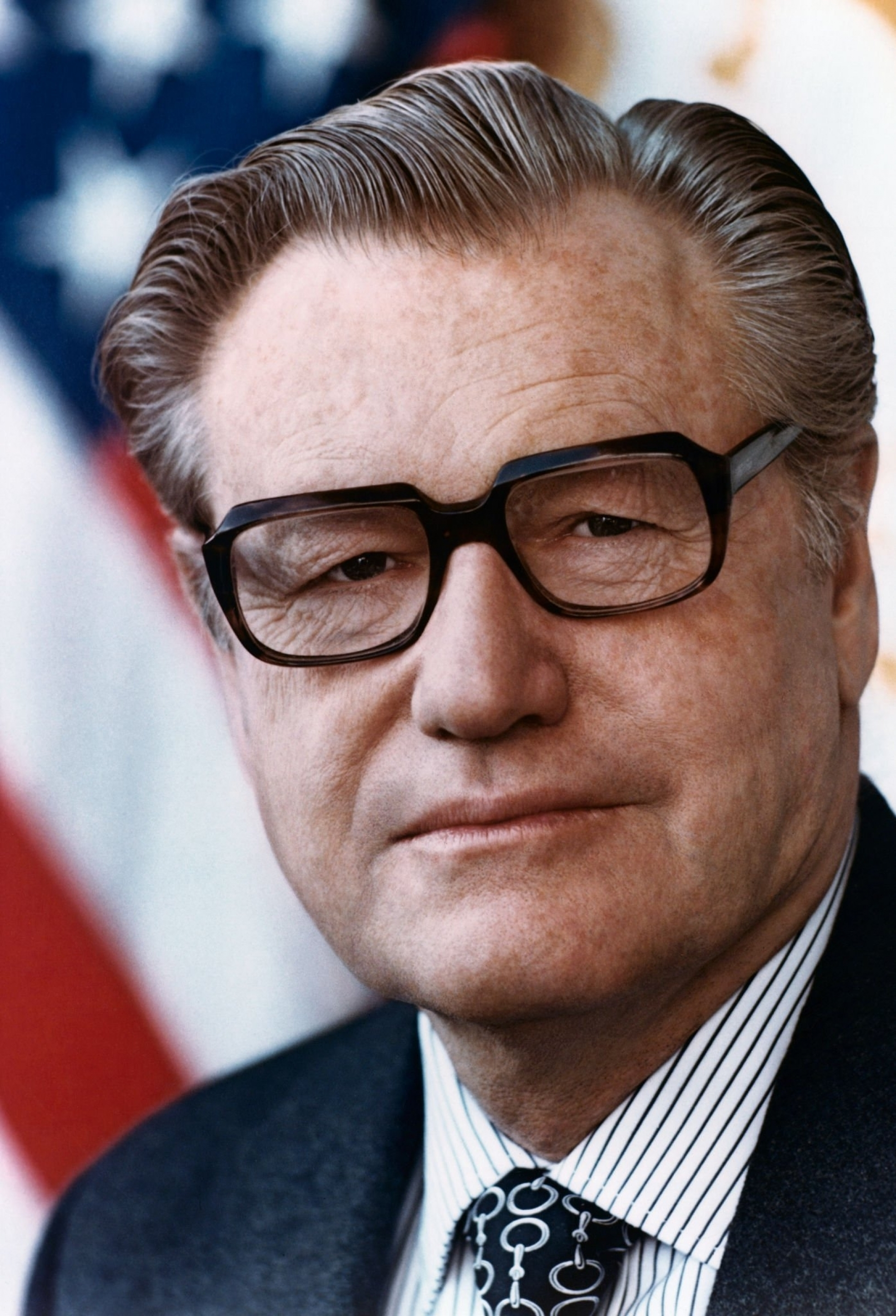
Nelson Rockefeller (R),
until January 20, 1977

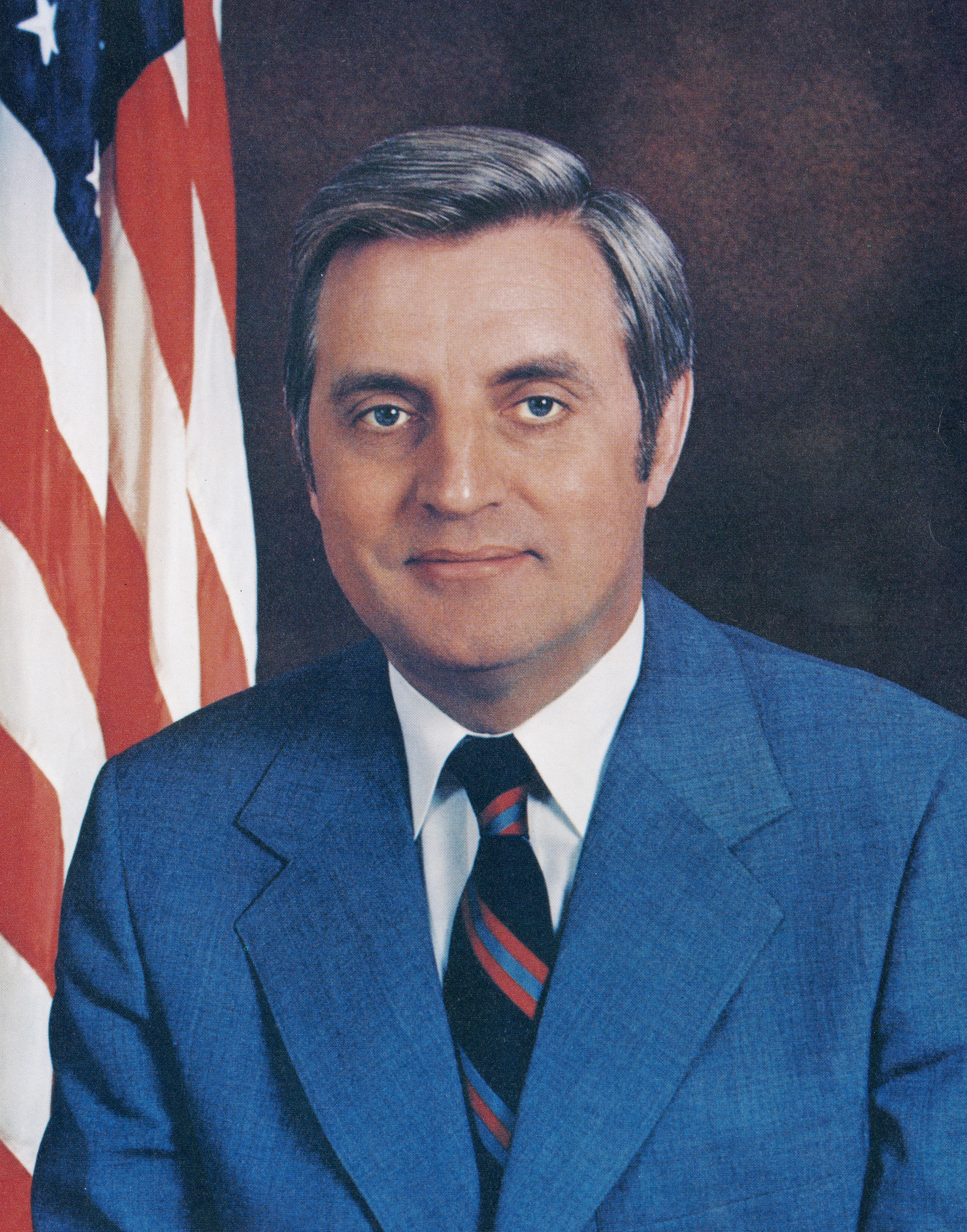
Walter Mondale (D),
from January 20, 1977

House Speaker

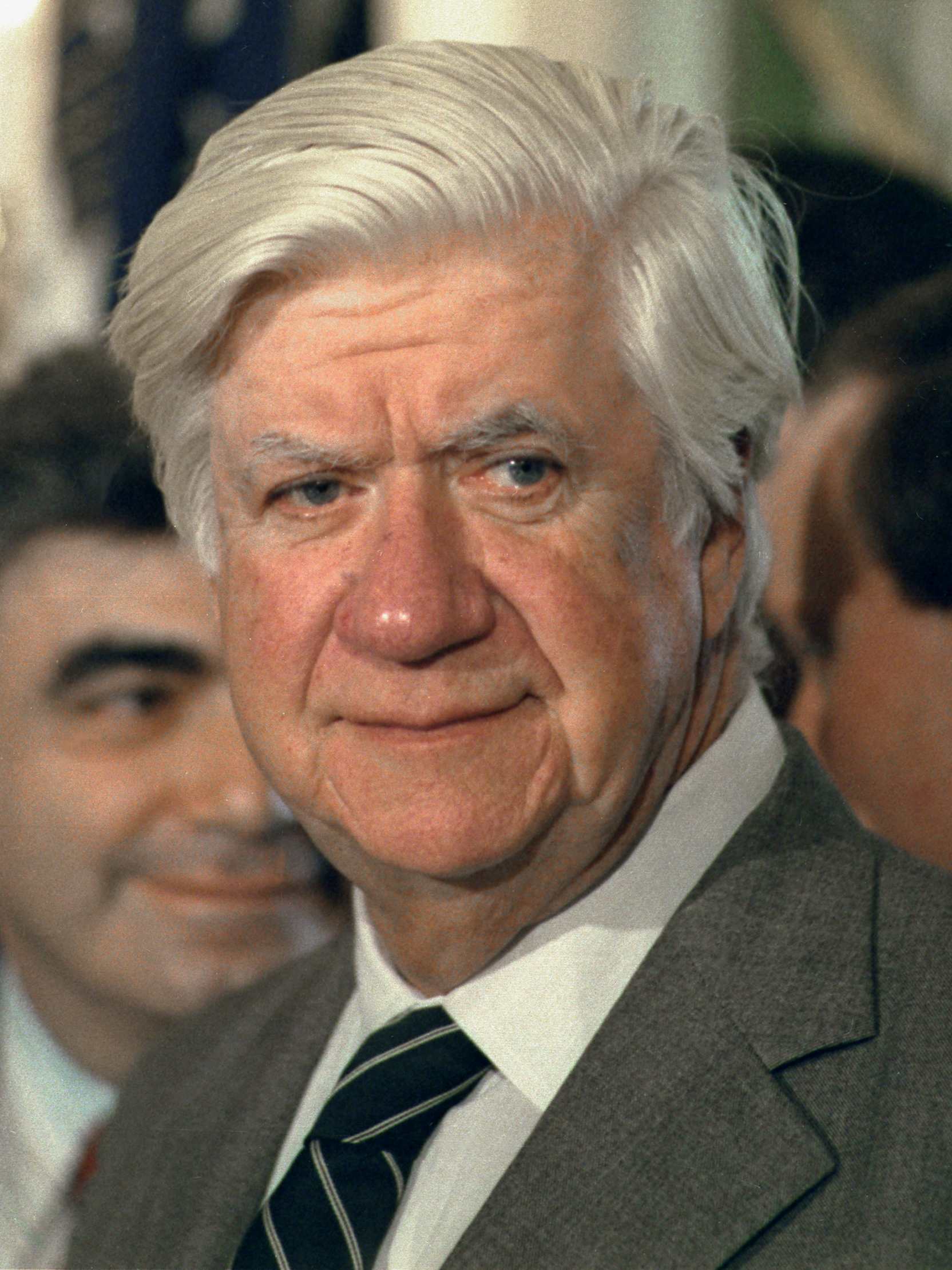
Tip O'Neill (D)

- President: Nelson Rockefeller (R), until January 20, 1977
  - Walter Mondale (D), from January 20, 1977
- President pro tempore: James Eastland (D)
- Permanent Acting President pro tempore: Lee Metcalf (D), until January 12, 1978
- Deputy President pro tempore: Hubert Humphrey (D), until January 13, 1978

==== Majority (Democratic) leadership ====
- Majority Leader: Robert Byrd
- Majority Whip: Alan Cranston
- Democratic Caucus Secretary: Daniel Inouye
- Democratic Campaign Committee Chairman: Wendell Ford

==== Minority (Republican) leadership ====
- Minority Leader: Howard Baker
- Minority Whip: Ted Stevens
- Republican Conference Chairman: Carl Curtis
- Republican Conference Secretary: Clifford Hansen
- National Senatorial Committee Chair: Bob Packwood
- Policy Committee Chairman: John Tower

=== House of Representatives ===
- Speaker: Tip O'Neill (D)

==== Majority (Democratic) leadership ====
- Majority Leader: Jim Wright
- Majority Whip: John Brademas
- Chief Deputy Majority Whip: Dan Rostenkowski
- Democratic Caucus Chairman: Tom Foley
- Democratic Caucus Secretary: Shirley Chisholm
- Democratic Campaign Committee Chairman: James C. Corman

==== Minority (Republican) leadership ====
- Minority Leader: John Jacob Rhodes
- Minority Whip: Robert H. Michel
- Republican Conference Chairman: John B. Anderson
- Republican Conference Vice-Chairman: Samuel L. Devine
- Republican Conference Secretary: Jack Edwards
- Policy Committee Chairman: Del M. Clawson
- Republican Campaign Committee Chairman: Guy Vander Jagt

== Caucuses ==
- Congressional Black Caucus
- Congressional Hispanic Caucus
- Congressional Caucus for Women's Issues
- House Democratic Caucus
- Senate Democratic Caucus

== Members ==
=== Senate ===
In this Congress, Class 2 meant their term ended with this Congress, facing re-election in 1978; Class 3 meant their term began in the last Congress, facing re-election in 1980; and Class 1 meant their term began in this Congress, facing re-election in 1982.

==== Alabama ====
▌2. John J. Sparkman (D)
▌3. James Allen (D), until June 1, 1978

▌Maryon Pittman Allen (D), from June 8, 1978, until November 7, 1978
▌Donald Stewart (D), from November 7, 1978

==== Alaska ====
▌2. Ted Stevens (R)
▌3. Mike Gravel (D)

==== Arizona ====
▌1. Dennis DeConcini (D)
▌3. Barry Goldwater (R)

==== Arkansas ====
▌2. John L. McClellan (D), until November 28, 1977

▌Kaneaster Hodges Jr. (D), from December 10, 1977

▌3. Dale Bumpers (D)

==== California ====
▌1. S. I. Hayakawa (R)
▌3. Alan Cranston (D)

==== Colorado ====
▌2. Floyd Haskell (D)
▌3. Gary Hart (D)

==== Connecticut ====
▌1. Lowell Weicker (R)
▌3. Abraham Ribicoff (D)

==== Delaware ====
▌1. William Roth (R)
▌2. Joe Biden (D)

==== Florida ====
▌1. Lawton Chiles (D)
▌3. Richard Stone (D)

==== Georgia ====
▌2. Sam Nunn (D)
▌3. Herman Talmadge (D)

==== Hawaii ====
▌1. Spark Matsunaga (D)
▌3. Daniel Inouye (D)

==== Idaho ====
▌2. James A. McClure (R)
▌3. Frank Church (D)

==== Illinois ====
▌2. Charles H. Percy (R)
▌3. Adlai Stevenson III (D)

==== Indiana ====
▌1. Richard Lugar (R)
▌3. Birch Bayh (D)

==== Iowa ====
▌2. Dick Clark (D)
▌3. John Culver (D)

==== Kansas ====
▌2. James B. Pearson (R), until December 23, 1978

▌Nancy Kassebaum (R), from December 23, 1978

▌3. Bob Dole (R)

==== Kentucky ====
▌2. Walter Dee Huddleston (D)
▌3. Wendell Ford (D)

==== Louisiana ====
▌2. J. Bennett Johnston (D)
▌3. Russell B. Long (D)

==== Maine ====
▌1. Edmund Muskie (D)
▌2. William Hathaway (D)

==== Maryland ====
▌1. Paul Sarbanes (D)
▌3. Charles Mathias (R)

==== Massachusetts ====
▌1. Ted Kennedy (D)
▌2. Edward Brooke (R)

==== Michigan ====
▌1. Donald Riegle (D)
▌2. Robert P. Griffin (R)

==== Minnesota ====
▌1. Hubert Humphrey, (DFL) (Note: The Minnesota Democratic–Farmer–Labor Party (DFL) and the North Dakota Democratic-Nonpartisan League Party (D-NPL) are the Minnesota and North Dakota affiliates of the U.S. Democratic Party and are counted as Democrats.), until January 13, 1978

▌Muriel Humphrey, (DFL), from January 25, 1978, until November 7, 1978
▌David Durenberger (I-R) (Note: The Republican Party of Minnesota was officially known as the Independent-Republicans of Minnesota from November 15, 1975, until September 23, 1995, and are counted as Republicans.), from November 8, 1978

▌2. Wendell R. Anderson, (DFL), until December 29, 1978

▌Rudy Boschwitz (I-R)

==== Mississippi ====
▌1. John C. Stennis (D)
▌2. James Eastland (D), until December 27, 1978

▌Thad Cochran (R), from December 27, 1978

==== Missouri ====
▌1. John Danforth (R)
▌3. Thomas Eagleton (D)

==== Montana ====
▌1. John Melcher (D)
▌2. Lee Metcalf (D), until January 12, 1978

▌Paul G. Hatfield (D), from January 22, 1978, until December 12, 1978
▌Max Baucus (D), from December 15, 1978

==== Nebraska ====
▌1. Edward Zorinsky (D)
▌2. Carl Curtis (R)

==== Nevada ====
▌1. Howard Cannon (D)
▌3. Paul Laxalt (R)

==== New Hampshire ====
▌2. Thomas J. McIntyre (D)
▌3. John A. Durkin (D)

==== New Jersey ====
▌1. Harrison A. Williams (D)
▌2. Clifford P. Case (R)

==== New Mexico ====
▌1. Harrison Schmitt (R)
▌2. Pete Domenici (R)

==== New York ====
▌1. Daniel Patrick Moynihan (D)
▌3. Jacob Javits (R)

==== North Carolina ====
▌2. Jesse Helms (R)
▌3. Robert Burren Morgan (D)

==== North Dakota ====
▌1. Quentin Burdick (D-NPL)
▌3. Milton Young (R)

==== Ohio ====
▌1. Howard Metzenbaum (D)
▌3. John Glenn (D)

==== Oklahoma ====
▌2. Dewey F. Bartlett (R)
▌3. Henry Bellmon (R)

==== Oregon ====
▌2. Mark Hatfield (R)
▌3. Bob Packwood (R)

==== Pennsylvania ====
▌1. John Heinz (R)
▌3. Richard Schweiker (R)

==== Rhode Island ====
▌1. John Chafee (R)
▌2. Claiborne Pell (D)

==== South Carolina ====
▌2. Strom Thurmond (R)
▌3. Fritz Hollings (D)

==== South Dakota ====
▌2. James Abourezk (D)
▌3. George McGovern (D)

==== Tennessee ====
▌1. Jim Sasser (D)
▌2. Howard Baker (R)

==== Texas ====
▌1. Lloyd Bentsen (D)
▌2. John Tower (R)

==== Utah ====
▌1. Orrin Hatch (R)
▌3. Jake Garn (R)

==== Vermont ====
▌1. Robert Stafford (R)
▌3. Patrick Leahy (D)

==== Virginia ====
▌1. Harry F. Byrd Jr. (ID)
▌2. William L. Scott (R), until January 1, 1979

▌John Warner (R), from January 2, 1979

==== Washington ====
▌1. Henry M. Jackson (D)
▌3. Warren G. Magnuson (D)

==== West Virginia ====
▌1. Robert Byrd (D)
▌2. Jennings Randolph (D)

==== Wisconsin ====
▌1. William Proxmire (D)
▌3. Gaylord Nelson (D)

==== Wyoming ====
▌1. Malcolm Wallop (R)
▌2. Clifford Hansen (R), until December 31, 1978

▌Alan Simpson (R), from January 1, 1979

Senators' party membership by state at the opening of the 95th Congress in January 1977 2 Democrats 1 Democrat and 1 Republican 2 Republicans 1 Independent and 1 Republican

Senate majority leadership

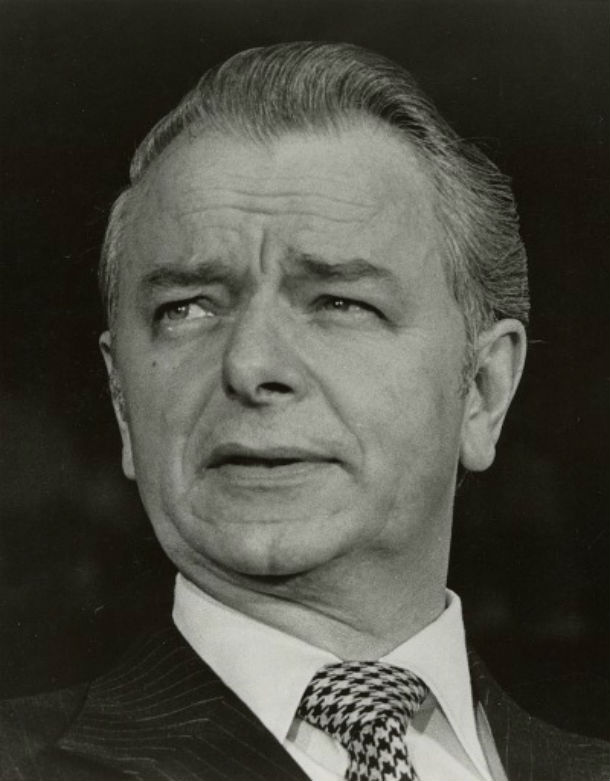
Democratic leader
Robert Byrd

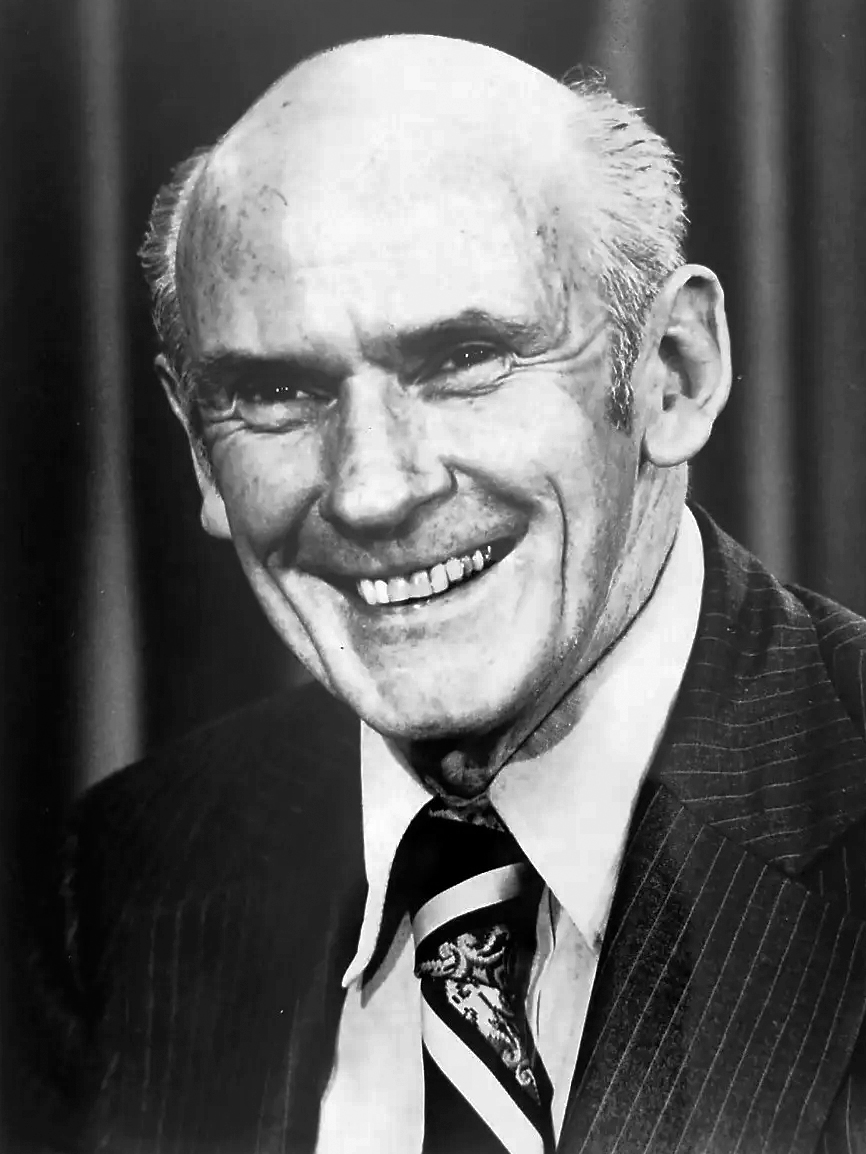
Democratic whip
Alan Cranston

Senate minority leadership

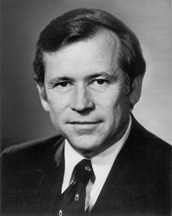
Republican leader
Howard Baker

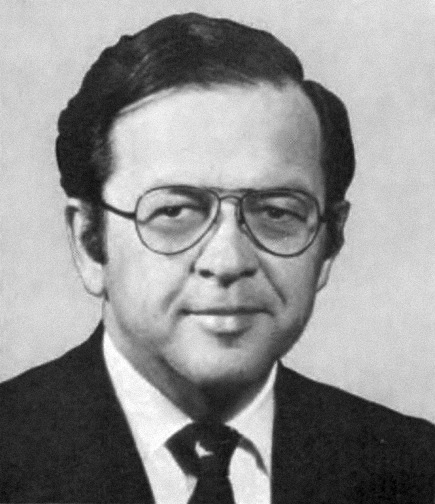
Republican whip
Ted Stevens

=== House of Representatives ===
Representatives elected statewide at-large, are preceded by "At-large", and the names of those elected from districts, are preceded by their district numbers.

Many of the congressional district numbers are linked to articles describing the district itself. Since the boundaries of the districts have changed often and substantially, the linked article may only describe the district as it exists today, and not as it was at the time of this Congress.

==== Alabama ====
▌1. Jack Edwards (R)
▌2. William Louis Dickinson (R)
▌3. Bill Nichols (D)
▌4. Tom Bevill (D)
▌5. Ronnie Flippo (D)
▌6. John Hall Buchanan Jr. (R)
▌7. Walter Flowers (D)

==== Alaska ====
▌At-large. Don Young (R)

==== Arizona ====
▌1. John Jacob Rhodes (R)
▌2. Mo Udall (D)
▌3. Bob Stump (D)
▌4. Eldon Rudd (R)

==== Arkansas ====
▌1. William Vollie Alexander Jr. (D)
▌2. Jim Guy Tucker (D)
▌3. John Paul Hammerschmidt (R)
▌4. Ray Thornton (D)

==== California ====
▌1. Harold T. Johnson (D)
▌2. Donald H. Clausen (R)
▌3. John E. Moss (D), until December 31, 1978
▌4. Robert L. Leggett (D)
▌5. John Burton (D)
▌6. Phillip Burton (D)
▌7. George Miller (D)
▌8. Ron Dellums (D)
▌9. Pete Stark (D)
▌10. Don Edwards (D)
▌11. Leo Ryan (D), until November 18, 1978
▌12. Pete McCloskey (R)
▌13. Norman Mineta (D)
▌14. John J. McFall (D), until December 31, 1978
▌15. B. F. Sisk (D)
▌16. Leon Panetta (D)
▌17. John Hans Krebs (D)
▌18. William M. Ketchum (R), until June 24, 1978
▌19. Robert J. Lagomarsino (R)
▌20. Barry Goldwater Jr. (R)
▌21. James C. Corman (D)
▌22. Carlos Moorhead (R)
▌23. Anthony Beilenson (D)
▌24. Henry Waxman (D)
▌25. Edward R. Roybal (D)
▌26. John H. Rousselot (R)
▌27. Bob Dornan (R)
▌28. Yvonne Brathwaite Burke (D)
▌29. Augustus Hawkins (D)
▌30. George E. Danielson (D)
▌31. Charles H. Wilson (D)
▌32. Glenn M. Anderson (D)
▌33. Del M. Clawson (R), until December 31, 1978
▌34. Mark W. Hannaford (D)
▌35. James F. Lloyd (D)
▌36. George Brown Jr. (D)
▌37. Shirley Neil Pettis (R)
▌38. Jerry M. Patterson (D)
▌39. Charles E. Wiggins (R)
▌40. Robert Badham (R)
▌41. Bob Wilson (R)
▌42. Lionel Van Deerlin (D)
▌43. Clair Burgener (R)

==== Colorado ====
▌1. Pat Schroeder (D)
▌2. Tim Wirth (D)
▌3. Frank Evans (D)
▌4. James Paul Johnson (R)
▌5. William L. Armstrong (R)

==== Connecticut ====
▌1. William R. Cotter (D)
▌2. Chris Dodd (D)
▌3. Robert Giaimo (D)
▌4. Stewart McKinney (R)
▌5. Ronald A. Sarasin (R)
▌6. Toby Moffett (D)

==== Delaware ====
▌At-large. Thomas B. Evans Jr. (R)

==== Florida ====
▌1. Robert L. F. Sikes (D)
▌2. Don Fuqua (D)
▌3. Charles E. Bennett (D)
▌4. Bill Chappell (D)
▌5. Richard Kelly (R)
▌6. Bill Young (R)
▌7. Sam Gibbons (D)
▌8. Andy Ireland (D)
▌9. Louis Frey Jr. (R)
▌10. Skip Bafalis (R)
▌11. Paul Rogers (D)
▌12. J. Herbert Burke (R)
▌13. William Lehman (D)
▌14. Claude Pepper (D)
▌15. Dante Fascell (D)

==== Georgia ====
▌1. Bo Ginn (D)
▌2. Dawson Mathis (D)
▌3. Jack Brinkley (D)
▌4. Elliott H. Levitas (D)
▌5. Andrew Young (D), until January 29, 1977

▌Wyche Fowler (D), from April 6, 1977

▌6. John Flynt (D)
▌7. Larry McDonald (D)
▌8. Billy Lee Evans (D)
▌9. Ed Jenkins (D)
▌10. Doug Barnard Jr. (D)

==== Hawaii ====
▌1. Cecil Heftel (D)
▌2. Daniel Akaka (D)

==== Idaho ====
▌1. Steve Symms (R)
▌2. George V. Hansen (R)

==== Illinois ====
▌1. Ralph Metcalfe (D), until October 10, 1978
▌2. Morgan F. Murphy (D)
▌3. Marty Russo (D)
▌4. Ed Derwinski (R)
▌5. John G. Fary (D)
▌6. Henry Hyde (R)
▌7. Cardiss Collins (D)
▌8. Dan Rostenkowski (D)
▌9. Sidney R. Yates (D)
▌10. Abner J. Mikva (D)
▌11. Frank Annunzio (D)
▌12. Phil Crane (R)
▌13. Robert McClory (R)
▌14. John N. Erlenborn (R)
▌15. Tom Corcoran (R)
▌16. John B. Anderson (R)
▌17. George M. O'Brien (R)
▌18. Robert H. Michel (R)
▌19. Tom Railsback (R)
▌20. Paul Findley (R)
▌21. Edward Rell Madigan (R)
▌22. George E. Shipley (D)
▌23. Melvin Price (D)
▌24. Paul Simon (D)

==== Indiana ====
▌1. Adam Benjamin Jr. (D)
▌2. Floyd Fithian (D)
▌3. John Brademas (D)
▌4. Dan Quayle (R)
▌5. Elwood Hillis (R)
▌6. David W. Evans (D)
▌7. John T. Myers (R)
▌8. David L. Cornwell (D)
▌9. Lee H. Hamilton (D)
▌10. Philip Sharp (D)
▌11. Andrew Jacobs Jr. (D)

==== Iowa ====
▌1. Jim Leach (R)
▌2. Mike Blouin (D)
▌3. Chuck Grassley (R)
▌4. Neal Edward Smith (D)
▌5. Tom Harkin (D)
▌6. Berkley Bedell (D)

==== Kansas ====
▌1. Keith Sebelius (R)
▌2. Martha Keys (D)
▌3. Larry Winn (R)
▌4. Dan Glickman (D)
▌5. Joe Skubitz (R), until December 31, 1978

==== Kentucky ====
▌1. Carroll Hubbard (D)
▌2. William Natcher (D)
▌3. Romano Mazzoli (D)
▌4. Gene Snyder (R)
▌5. Tim Lee Carter (R)
▌6. John B. Breckinridge (D)
▌7. Carl D. Perkins (D)

==== Louisiana ====
▌1. Richard Alvin Tonry (D), until May 4, 1977

▌Bob Livingston (R), from August 27, 1977

▌2. Lindy Boggs (D)
▌3. Dave Treen (R)
▌4. Joe Waggonner (D)
▌5. Jerry Huckaby (D)
▌6. Henson Moore (R)
▌7. John Breaux (D)
▌8. Gillis William Long (D)

==== Maine ====
▌1. David F. Emery (R)
▌2. William Cohen (R)

==== Maryland ====
▌1. Robert Bauman (R)
▌2. Clarence Long (D)
▌3. Barbara Mikulski (D)
▌4. Marjorie Holt (R)
▌5. Gladys Spellman (D)
▌6. Goodloe Byron (D), until October 11, 1978
▌7. Parren Mitchell (D)
▌8. Newton Steers (R)

==== Massachusetts ====
▌1. Silvio O. Conte (R)
▌2. Edward Boland (D)
▌3. Joseph D. Early (D)
▌4. Robert Drinan (D)
▌5. Paul Tsongas (D)
▌6. Michael J. Harrington (D)
▌7. Ed Markey (D)
▌8. Tip O'Neill (D)
▌9. Joe Moakley (D)
▌10. Margaret Heckler (R)
▌11. James A. Burke (D)
▌12. Gerry Studds (D)

==== Michigan ====
▌1. John Conyers (D)
▌2. Carl Pursell (R)
▌3. Garry E. Brown (R)
▌4. David Stockman (R)
▌5. Harold S. Sawyer (R)
▌6. Milton Robert Carr (D)
▌7. Dale Kildee (D)
▌8. J. Bob Traxler (D)
▌9. Guy Vander Jagt (R)
▌10. Elford Albin Cederberg (R), until December 31, 1978
▌11. Philip Ruppe (R)
▌12. David Bonior (D)
▌13. Charles Diggs (D)
▌14. Lucien Nedzi (D)
▌15. William D. Ford (D)
▌16. John D. Dingell Jr. (D)
▌17. William M. Brodhead (D)
▌18. James Blanchard (D)
▌19. William Broomfield (R)

==== Minnesota ====
▌1. Al Quie (I-R)
▌2. Tom Hagedorn (I-R)
▌3. Bill Frenzel (I-R)
▌4. Bruce Vento (DFL)
▌5. Donald M. Fraser (DFL)
▌6. Rick Nolan (DFL)
▌7. Robert Bergland (DFL), until January 22, 1977

▌Arlan Stangeland (I-R)

▌8. Jim Oberstar, (DFL)

==== Mississippi ====
▌1. Jamie L. Whitten (D)
▌2. David R. Bowen (D)
▌3. Sonny Montgomery (D)
▌4. Thad Cochran (R), until December 26, 1978
▌5. Trent Lott (R)

==== Missouri ====
▌1. Bill Clay (D)
▌2. Robert A. Young (D)
▌3. Dick Gephardt (D)
▌4. Ike Skelton (D)
▌5. Richard Walker Bolling (D)
▌6. Tom Coleman (R)
▌7. Gene Taylor (R)
▌8. Richard Howard Ichord Jr. (D)
▌9. Harold Volkmer (D)
▌10. Bill Burlison (D)

==== Montana ====
▌1. Max Baucus (D), until December 14, 1978
▌2. Ron Marlenee (R)

==== Nebraska ====
▌1. Charles Thone (R)
▌2. John Joseph Cavanaugh III (D)
▌3. Virginia D. Smith (R)

==== Nevada ====
▌At-large. James David Santini (D)

==== New Hampshire ====
▌1. Norman D'Amours (D)
▌2. James Colgate Cleveland (R)

==== New Jersey ====
▌1. James Florio (D)
▌2. William J. Hughes (D)
▌3. James J. Howard (D)
▌4. Frank Thompson (D)
▌5. Millicent Fenwick (R)
▌6. Edwin B. Forsythe (R)
▌7. Andrew Maguire (D)
▌8. Robert A. Roe (D)
▌9. Harold C. Hollenbeck (R)
▌10. Peter W. Rodino (D)
▌11. Joseph Minish (D)
▌12. Matthew John Rinaldo (R)
▌13. Helen Stevenson Meyner (D)
▌14. Joseph A. LeFante (D), until December 14, 1978
▌15. Edward J. Patten (D)

==== New Mexico ====
▌1. Manuel Lujan Jr. (R)
▌2. Harold L. Runnels (D)

==== New York ====
▌1. Otis G. Pike (D)
▌2. Thomas Downey (D)
▌3. Jerome Ambro (D)
▌4. Norman F. Lent (R)
▌5. John W. Wydler (R)
▌6. Lester L. Wolff (D)
▌7. Joseph P. Addabbo (D)
▌8. Benjamin Stanley Rosenthal (D)
▌9. James J. Delaney (D), until December 31, 1978
▌10. Mario Biaggi (D)
▌11. James H. Scheuer (D)
▌12. Shirley Chisholm (D)
▌13. Stephen Solarz (D)
▌14. Fred Richmond (D)
▌15. Leo C. Zeferetti (D)
▌16. Elizabeth Holtzman (D)
▌17. John M. Murphy (D)
▌18. Ed Koch (D), until December 31, 1977

▌Bill Green (R), from February 14, 1978

▌19. Charles Rangel (D)
▌20. Theodore S. Weiss (D)
▌21. Herman Badillo (D), until December 31, 1977

▌Robert Garcia (D), from February 21, 1978

▌22. Jonathan Brewster Bingham (D)
▌23. Bruce F. Caputo (R)
▌24. Richard Ottinger (D)
▌25. Hamilton Fish IV (R)
▌26. Benjamin Gilman (R)
▌27. Matthew F. McHugh (D)
▌28. Samuel S. Stratton (D)
▌29. Edward W. Pattison (D)
▌30. Robert C. McEwen (R)
▌31. Donald J. Mitchell (R)
▌32. James M. Hanley (D)
▌33. William F. Walsh (R)
▌34. Frank Horton (R)
▌35. Barber Conable (R)
▌36. John J. LaFalce (D)
▌37. Henry J. Nowak (D)
▌38. Jack Kemp (R)
▌39. Stan Lundine (D)

==== North Carolina ====
▌1. Walter B. Jones Sr. (D)
▌2. Lawrence H. Fountain (D)
▌3. Charles Orville Whitley (D)
▌4. Ike Franklin Andrews (D)
▌5. Stephen L. Neal (D)
▌6. L. Richardson Preyer (D)
▌7. Charlie Rose (D)
▌8. Bill Hefner (D)
▌9. James G. Martin (R)
▌10. Jim Broyhill (R)
▌11. V. Lamar Gudger (D)

==== North Dakota ====
▌1. Mark Andrews (R)

==== Ohio ====
▌1. Bill Gradison (R)
▌2. Tom Luken (D)
▌3. Charles W. Whalen Jr. (R)
▌4. Tennyson Guyer (R)
▌5. Del Latta (R)
▌6. Bill Harsha (R)
▌7. Bud Brown (R)
▌8. Tom Kindness (R)
▌9. Thomas L. Ashley (D)
▌10. Clarence E. Miller (R)
▌11. J. William Stanton (R)
▌12. Samuel L. Devine (R)
▌13. Donald J. Pease (D)
▌14. John F. Seiberling (D)
▌15. Chalmers Wylie (R)
▌16. Ralph Regula (R)
▌17. John M. Ashbrook (R)
▌18. Douglas Applegate (D)
▌19. Charles J. Carney (D)
▌20. Mary Rose Oakar (D)
▌21. Louis Stokes (D)
▌22. Charles Vanik (D)
▌23. Ronald M. Mottl (D)

==== Oklahoma ====
▌1. James R. Jones (D)
▌2. Ted Risenhoover (D)
▌3. Wes Watkins (D)
▌4. Tom Steed (D)
▌5. Mickey Edwards (R)
▌6. Glenn English (D)

==== Oregon ====
▌1. Les AuCoin (D)
▌2. Al Ullman (D)
▌3. Robert B. Duncan (D)
▌4. Jim Weaver (D)

==== Pennsylvania ====
▌1. Michael Myers (D)
▌2. Robert N. C. Nix Sr. (D)
▌3. Raymond Lederer (D)
▌4. Joshua Eilberg (D)
▌5. Richard T. Schulze (R)
▌6. Gus Yatron (D)
▌7. Robert W. Edgar (D)
▌8. Peter H. Kostmayer (D)
▌9. Bud Shuster (R)
▌10. Joseph M. McDade (R)
▌11. Dan Flood (D)
▌12. John Murtha (D)
▌13. Lawrence Coughlin (R)
▌14. William S. Moorhead (D)
▌15. Fred B. Rooney (D)
▌16. Robert Smith Walker (R)
▌17. Allen E. Ertel (D)
▌18. Doug Walgren (D)
▌19. William F. Goodling (R)
▌20. Joseph M. Gaydos (D)
▌21. John Herman Dent (D)
▌22. Austin Murphy (D)
▌23. Joseph S. Ammerman (D)
▌24. Marc L. Marks (R)
▌25. Gary A. Myers (R)

==== Rhode Island ====
▌1. Fernand St Germain (D)
▌2. Edward Beard (D)

==== South Carolina ====
▌1. Mendel Jackson Davis (D)
▌2. Floyd Spence (R)
▌3. Butler Derrick (D)
▌4. James Mann (D)
▌5. Kenneth Lamar Holland (D)
▌6. John Jenrette (D)

==== South Dakota ====
▌1. Larry Pressler (R)
▌2. James Abdnor (R)

==== Tennessee ====
▌1. Jimmy Quillen (R)
▌2. John Duncan Sr. (R)
▌3. Marilyn Lloyd (D)
▌4. Albert Gore Jr. (D)
▌5. Clifford Allen (D), until June 18, 1978
▌6. Robin Beard (R)
▌7. Ed Jones (D)
▌8. Harold Ford Sr. (D)

==== Texas ====
▌1. Sam B. Hall Jr. (D)
▌2. Charlie Wilson (D)
▌3. James M. Collins (R)
▌4. Ray Roberts (D)
▌5. Jim Mattox (D)
▌6. Olin E. Teague (D), until December 31, 1978
▌7. Bill Archer (R)
▌8. Robert C. Eckhardt (D)
▌9. Jack Brooks (D)
▌10. J. J. Pickle (D)
▌11. William R. Poage (D), until December 31, 1978
▌12. Jim Wright (D)
▌13. Jack Hightower (D)
▌14. John Andrew Young (D)
▌15. Kika de la Garza (D)
▌16. Richard Crawford White (D)
▌17. Omar Burleson (D), until December 31, 1978
▌18. Barbara Jordan (D)
▌19. George H. Mahon (D)
▌20. Henry B. González (D)
▌21. Bob Krueger (D)
▌22. Robert Gammage (D)
▌23. Abraham Kazen (D)
▌24. Dale Milford (D)

==== Utah ====
▌1. K. Gunn McKay (D)
▌2. David Daniel Marriott (R)

==== Vermont ====
▌At-large. Jim Jeffords (R)

==== Virginia ====
▌1. Paul Trible (R)
▌2. G. William Whitehurst (R)
▌3. David E. Satterfield III (D)
▌4. Robert Daniel (R)
▌5. Dan Daniel (D)
▌6. M. Caldwell Butler (R)
▌7. J. Kenneth Robinson (R)
▌8. Herbert Harris (D)
▌9. William C. Wampler (R)
▌10. Joseph L. Fisher (D)

==== Washington ====
▌1. Joel Pritchard (R)
▌2. Lloyd Meeds (D)
▌3. Don Bonker (D)
▌4. Mike McCormack (D)
▌5. Tom Foley (D)
▌6. Norm Dicks (D)
▌7. Brock Adams (D), until January 22, 1977

▌John E. Cunningham (R) from May 17, 1977

==== West Virginia ====
▌1. Bob Mollohan (D)
▌2. Harley Orrin Staggers (D)
▌3. John M. Slack Jr. (D)
▌4. Nick Rahall (D)

==== Wisconsin ====
▌1. Les Aspin (D)
▌2. Robert Kastenmeier (D)
▌3. Alvin Baldus (D)
▌4. Clement J. Zablocki (D)
▌5. Henry S. Reuss (D)
▌6. William A. Steiger (R), until December 4, 1978
▌7. Dave Obey (D)
▌8. Robert John Cornell (D)
▌9. Bob Kasten (R)

==== Wyoming ====
▌At-large. Teno Roncalio (D), until December 30, 1978

==== Non-voting members ====
▌District of Columbia. Walter Fauntroy (D)
▌Guam. Antonio Borja Won Pat (D)
▌Puerto Rico. Baltasar Corrada del Río (PNP)
▌Virgin Islands. Ron de Lugo (D)

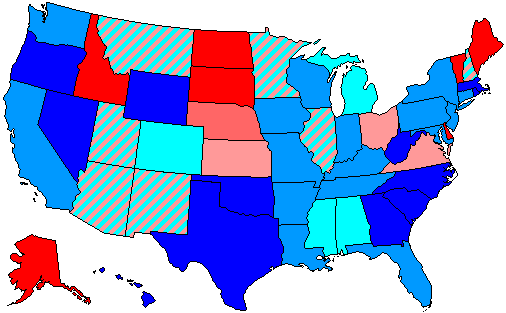
House seats by party holding plurality in state: 80+% to 100% Republican / 80+% to 100% Democratic; 60+% to 80% Republican / 60+% to 80% Democratic; 50+% to 60% Republican / 50+% to 60% Democratic; Striped: 50–50 split

House majority leadership

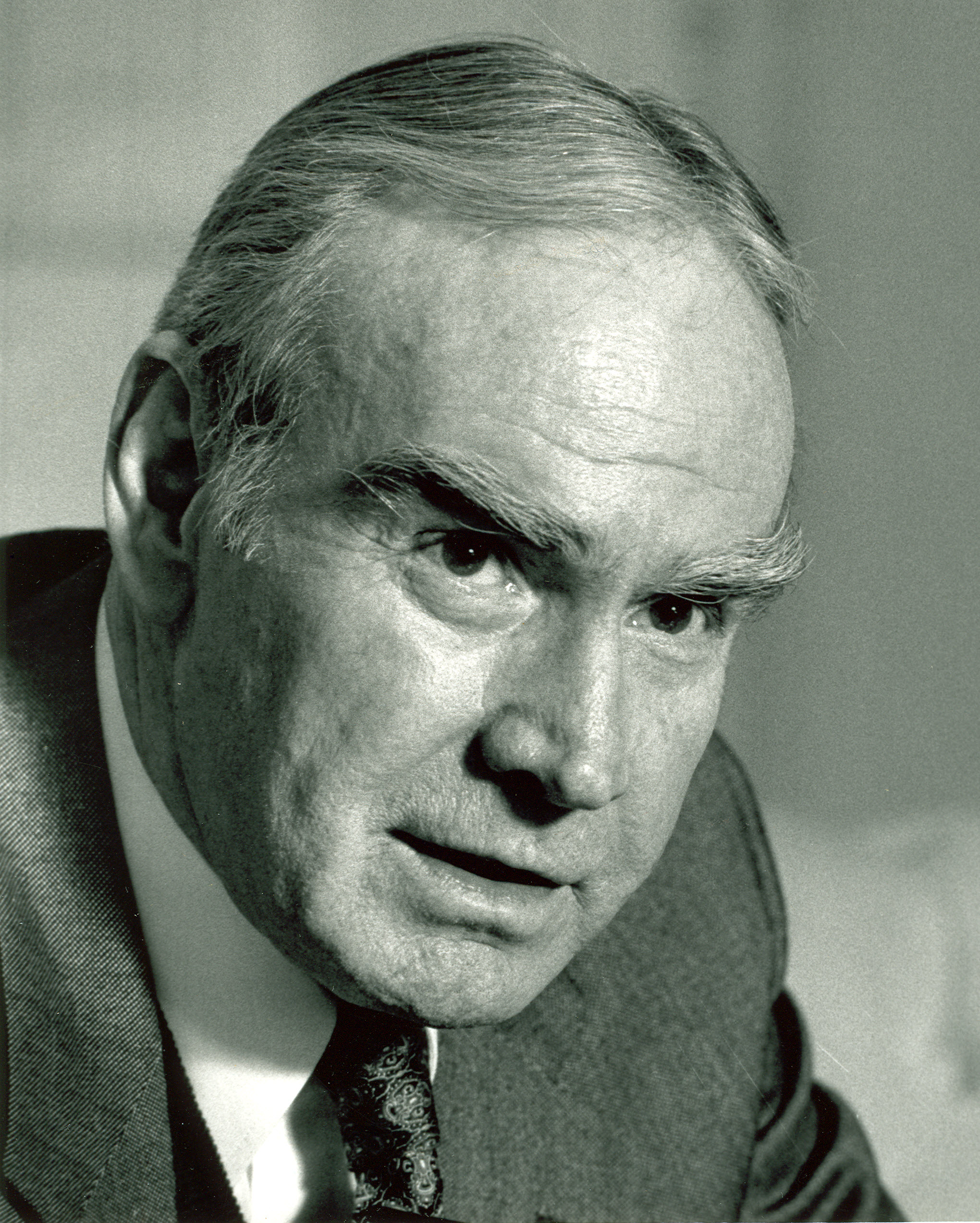
Democratic leader
Jim Wright

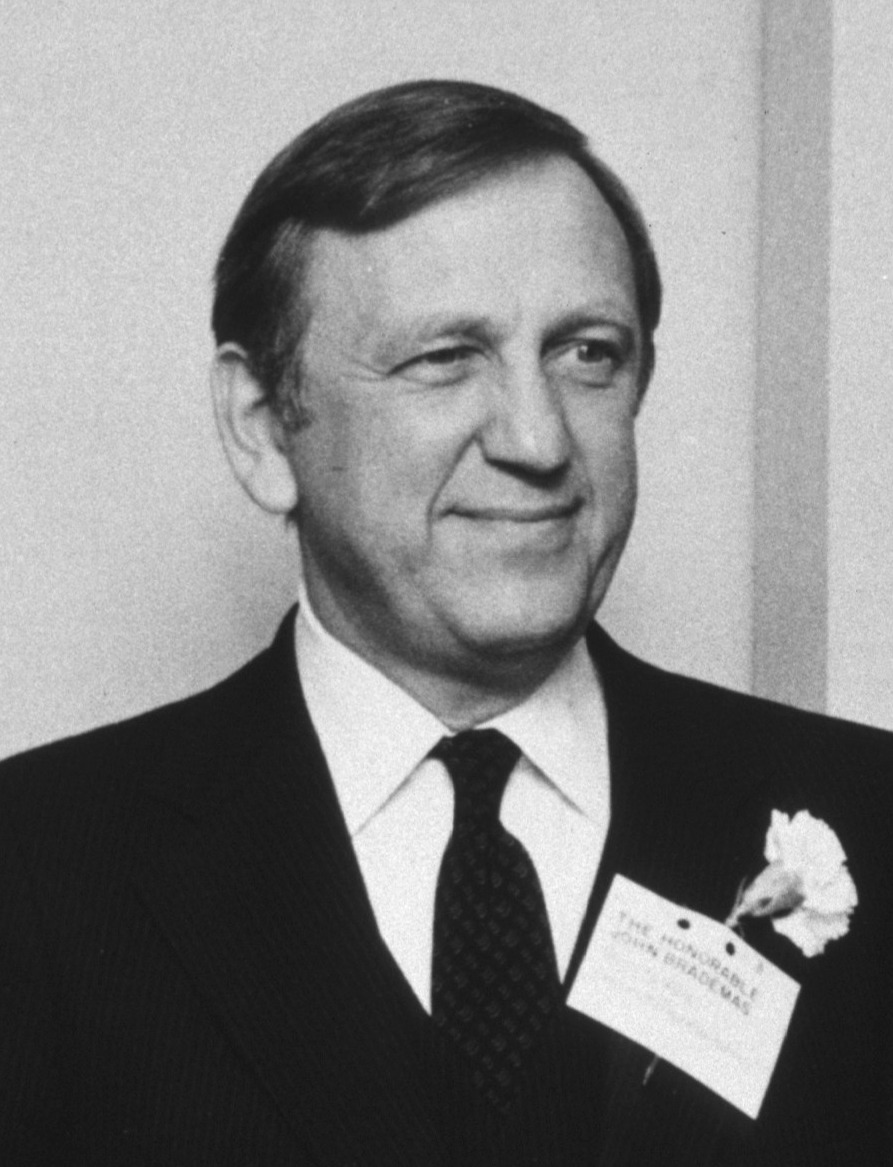
Democratic whip
John Brademas

House minority leadership

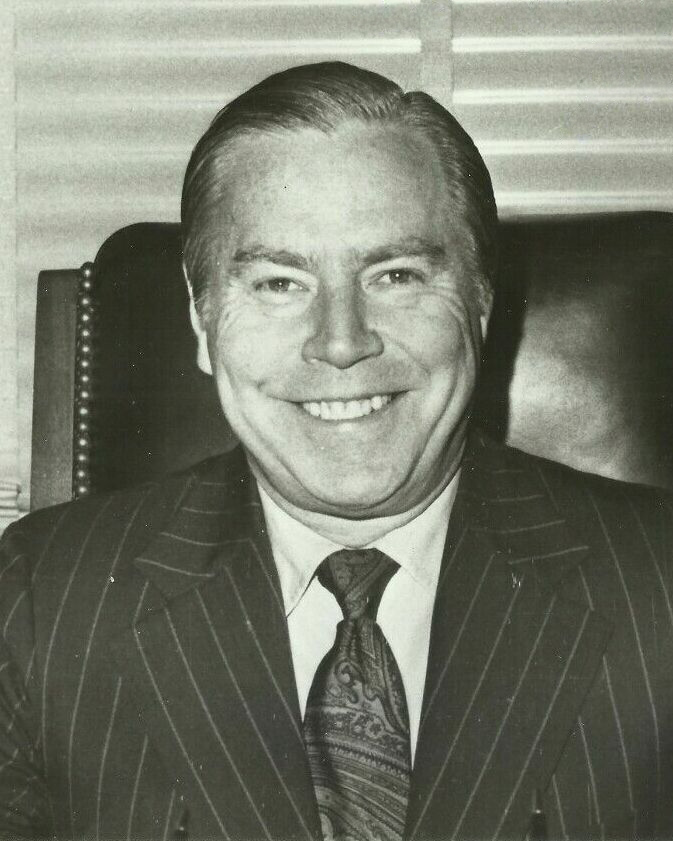
Republican leader
John Jacob Rhodes

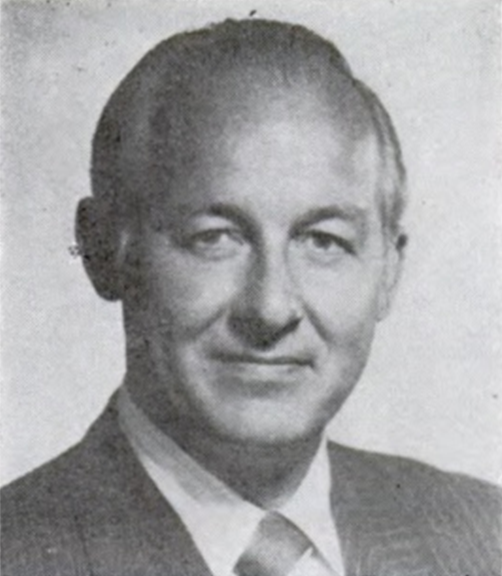
Republican whip
Bob Michel

== Changes in membership ==
The count below reflects changes from the beginning of the first session of this Congress.

=== Senate ===
- Replacements: 11
  - Democratic: 3 seat net loss
  - Republican: 3 seat net gain
- Deaths: 4
- Resignations: 5
- Vacancy: 0
- Total seats with changes: 9

Senate changes
State (class)	Vacated by	Reason for change	Successor	Date of successor's formal installation (Note: When seated or oath administered, not necessarily when service began.)
Arkansas (2)	John L. McClellan (D)	Died November 28, 1977. Successor appointed to finish the term.	Kaneaster Hodges Jr. (D)	December 10, 1977
Montana (2)	Lee Metcalf (D)	Died January 12, 1978. Successor appointed to finish the term.	Paul G. Hatfield (D)	January 22, 1978
Minnesota (1)	Hubert Humphrey (DFL)	Died January 13, 1978. Successor appointed to continue the term.	Muriel Humphrey (DFL)	January 25, 1978
Alabama (3)	James Allen (D)	Died June 1, 1978. Successor appointed to continue the term.	Maryon Pittman Allen (D)	June 8, 1978
Alabama (3)	Maryon Pittman Allen (D)	Appointee lost special election. Successor elected November 7, 1978.	Donald Stewart (D)	November 8, 1978
Minnesota (1)	Muriel Humphrey (DFL)	Appointee retired when successor qualified. Successor elected November 7, 1978.	David Durenberger (I-R)	November 8, 1978
Montana (2)	Paul G. Hatfield (D)	Lost nomination to the next term. Resigned early December 12, 1978. Successor appointed, having already been elected to the next term.	Max Baucus (D)	December 15, 1978
Kansas (2)	James B. Pearson (R)	Resigned December 23, 1978. Successor appointed, having already been elected to the next term.	Nancy Kassebaum (R)	December 23, 1978
Mississippi (2)	James Eastland (D)	Resigned December 27, 1978. Successor appointed, having already been elected to the next term.	Thad Cochran (R)	December 27, 1978
Minnesota (2)	Wendell R. Anderson (DFL)	Resigned December 29, 1978. Successor appointed, having already been elected to the next term.	Rudy Boschwitz (I-R)	December 30, 1978
Wyoming (2)	Clifford Hansen (R)	Resigned December 31, 1978. Successor appointed, having already been elected to the next term.	Alan Simpson (R)	January 1, 1979
Virginia (2)	William L. Scott (R)	Resigned January 1, 1979. Successor appointed, having already been elected to the next term.	John Warner (R)	January 2, 1979

=== House of Representatives ===
- Replacements: 6
  - Democratic: 4 seat net loss
  - Republican: 4 seat net gain
- Deaths: 6
- Resignations: 21
- Contested election: 0
- Total seats with changes: 25

House changes
District	Vacated by	Reason for change	Successor	Date of successor's formal installation
Minnesota 7th	Robert Bergland (DFL)	Resigned January 22, 1977, after being appointed United States Secretary of Agriculture	Arlan Stangeland (R)	February 22, 1977
Washington 7th	Brock Adams (D)	Resigned January 22, 1977, after being appointed United States Secretary of Transportation	John E. Cunningham (R)	May 17, 1977
Georgia 5th	Andrew Young (D)	Resigned January 29, 1977, after being appointed United States Ambassador to the United Nations	Wyche Fowler (D)	April 6, 1977
Louisiana 1st	Richard Alvin Tonry (D)	Forced to resign May 4, 1977	Bob Livingston (R)	August 27, 1977
New York 18th	Ed Koch (D)	Resigned December 31, 1977, after being elected Mayor of New York City	Bill Green (R)	February 14, 1978
New York 21st	Herman Badillo (D)	Resigned December 31, 1977, after becoming Deputy Mayor of New York City. Elected on the Republican and Liberal tickets on February 14, but officially took office as a Democrat after being accepted by the caucus on February 21.	Robert Garcia (D)	February 21, 1978
Tennessee 5th	Clifford Allen (D)	Died June 18, 1978	Vacant	Not filled this term
California 18th	William M. Ketchum (R)	Died June 24, 1978	Vacant	Not filled this term
Illinois 1st	Ralph Metcalfe (D)	Died October 10, 1978	Vacant	Not filled this term
Maryland 6th	Goodloe Byron (D)	Died October 11, 1978	Vacant	Not filled this term
California 11th	Leo Ryan (D)	Murdered by members of the Peoples Temple at the Guyana Airport November 18, 1978, shortly before the Jonestown Massacre	Vacant	Not filled this term
Wisconsin 6th	William A. Steiger (R)	Died December 4, 1978	Vacant	Not filled this term
Montana 1st	Max Baucus (D)	Resigned December 14, 1978, after being appointed to the U.S. Senate having already been elected.	Vacant	Not filled this term
Mississippi 4th	Thad Cochran (R)	Resigned December 26, 1978, after being appointed to the U.S. Senate having already been elected.	Vacant	Not filled this term
Wyoming at-large	Teno Roncalio (D)	Resigned December 30, 1978	Vacant	Not filled this term
California 3rd	John E. Moss (D)	Resigned December 31, 1978	Vacant	Not filled this term
California 14th	John J. McFall (D)	Resigned December 31, 1978	Vacant	Not filled this term
California 33rd	Del M. Clawson (R)	Resigned December 31, 1978	Vacant	Not filled this term
Kansas 5th	Joe Skubitz (R)	Resigned December 31, 1978	Vacant	Not filled this term
Michigan 10th	Elford Albin Cederberg (R)	Resigned December 31, 1978	Vacant	Not filled this term
New Jersey 14th	Joseph A. LeFante (D)	Resigned December 31, 1978	Vacant	Not filled this term
New York 9th	James J. Delaney (D)	Resigned December 31, 1978	Vacant	Not filled this term
Texas 6th	Olin E. Teague (D)	Resigned December 31, 1978	Vacant	Not filled this term
Texas 11th	William R. Poage (D)	Resigned December 31, 1978	Vacant	Not filled this term
Texas 17th	Omar Burleson (D)	Resigned December 31, 1978	Vacant	Not filled this term

== Committees ==
Lists of committees and their party leaders for members of the House and Senate committees can be found through the Official Congressional Directory at the bottom of this article. The directory after the pages of terms of service lists committees of the Senate, House (Standing with Subcommittees, Select and Special) and Joint and, after that, House/Senate committee assignments. On the committees section of the House and Senate in the Official Congressional Directory, the committee's members on the first row on the left side shows the chairman of the committee and on the right side shows the ranking member of the committee.

=== Senate ===
- Aging (Special) (Chair: Frank Church)
- Agriculture, Nutrition and Forestry (Chair: Herman Talmadge; Ranking Member: Bob Dole)
  - Environment, Soil Conservation and Forestry (Chair: James Eastland; Ranking Member: Jesse Helms)
  - Agricultural Credit and Rural Electrification (Chair: James Allen; Ranking Member: S.I. Hayakawa)
  - Agricultural Production, Marketing and Stabilization of Prices (Chair: Patrick Leahy; Ranking Member: Milton R. Young)
  - Agricultural Research and General Legislation (Chair: Patrick Leahy; Ranking Member: Bob Dole)
  - Rural Development (Chair: Dick Clark; Ranking Member: Carl T. Curtis)
  - Foreign Agricultural Policy (Chair: Hubert Humphrey; Ranking Member: Henry Bellmon)
  - Nutrition (Chair: George McGovern; Ranking Member: Bob Dole)
- Appropriations (Chair: Warren Magnuson; Ranking Member: Milton Young)
  - Agriculture and Related Agencies (Chair: Thomas Eagleton; Ranking Member: Henry Bellmon)
  - Defense (Chair: John L. McClellan; Ranking Member: Milton R. Young)
  - District of Columbia (Chair: Patrick Leahy; Ranking Member: Charles Mathias)
  - Foreign Operations (Chair: Daniel Inouye; Ranking Member; Ranking Member: Richard S. Schweiker)
  - HUD-Independent Agencies (Chair: William Proxmire; Ranking Member: Ted Stevens)
  - Interior (Chair: Robert Byrd; Ranking Member: Edward W. Brooke)
  - Labor, Health, Education and Welfare (Chair: Warren Magnuson; Ranking Member: Richard S. Schweiker)
  - Legislative (Chair: Walter "Dee" Huddleston; Ranking Member: Ted Stevens)
  - Military Construction (Chair: J. Bennett Johnston; Ranking Member: Ted Stevens)
  - Public Works (Chair: J. Bennett Johnston; Ranking Member: Mark O. Hatfield)
  - State, Justice, Commerce and the Judiciary (Chair: Fritz Hollings; Ranking Member: Lowell P. Weicker)
  - Transportation (Chair: Birch Bayh; Ranking Member: Clifford P. Case)
  - Treasury, Postal Service and General Government (Chair: Lawton Chiles; Ranking Member: Lowell P. Weicker)
- Armed Services (Chair: John C. Stennis; Ranking Member: John Tower)
  - Intelligence (Chair: Harry F. Byrd Jr.; Ranking Member: Barry Goldwater)
  - General Procurement (Chair: John C. Stennis; Ranking Member: John Tower)
  - Military Construction and Stockfiles (Chair: Gary Hart; Ranking Member: Strom Thurmond)
  - Arms Control (Chair: Henry M. Jackson; Ranking Member: Jesse Helms)
  - Tactical Aircraft (Chair: Howard Cannon; Ranking Member: Dewey F. Bartlett)
  - Research and Development (Chair: Thomas J. McIntyre; Ranking Member: Jake Garn)
  - General Legislation (Chair: John Culver; Ranking Member: Jake Garn)
  - Manpower and Personnel (Chair: Sam Nunn; Ranking Member: William L. Scott)
- Banking, Housing and Urban Affairs (Chair: William Proxmire; Ranking Member: Edward L. Brooke)
  - Federal Credit Programs (Chair: Paul Sarbanes; Ranking Member: Richard G. Lugar)
  - Housing and Urban Affairs (Chair: John Sparkman; Ranking Member: Edward W. Brooke)
  - Financial Institutions (Chair: Thomas J. McIntyre; Ranking Member: John G. Tower)
  - Securities (Chair: Harrison A. Williams; Ranking Member: Edward W. Brooke)
  - International Finance (Chair: Adlai Stevenson III; Ranking Member: H. John Heinz III)
  - Production and Stabilization (Chair: Alan Cranston; Ranking Member: Alan Cranston)
  - Consumer Affairs (Chair: Donald Riegle; Ranking Member: Harrison H. Schmitt)
  - Rural Housing (Chair: Robert Burren Morgan; Ranking Member: Jake Garn)
- Budget (Chair: Edmund Muskie; Ranking Member: Henry Bellmon)
- Commerce, Science and Transportation (Chair: Howard Cannon; Ranking Member: James B. Pearson)
  - Aviation (Chair: Howard Cannon; Ranking Member: Ted Stevens)
  - Communications (Chair: Fritz Hollings; Ranking Member: Robert P. Griffin)
  - Consumer (Chair: Wendell Ford; Ranking Member: Bob Packwood)
  - Merchant Marine and Tourism (Chair: Daniel Inouye; Ranking Member: Harrison H. Schmitt)
  - Science, Technology and Space (Chair: Adlai Stevenson III; Ranking Member: John C. Danforth)
  - Surface Transportation (Chair: Russell B. Long; Ranking Member: Clifford P. Hansen)
- Energy and Natural Resources (Chair: Henry M. Jackson; Ranking Member: Clifford P. Hansen)
  - Public Lands and Resources (Chair: Lee Metcalf; Ranking Member: James A. McClure)
  - Parks and Recreation (Chair: James Abourezk; Ranking Member: Clifford P. Hansen)
  - Energy Production and Supply (Chair: Floyd Haskell; Ranking Member: Dewey F. Bartlett)
  - Energy Conservation and Regulation (Chair: J. Bennett Johnston; Ranking Member: Lowell P. Weicker Jr.)
  - Energy R&D (Chair: Frank Church; Ranking Member: Mark O. Hatfield)
- Environment and Public Works (Chair: Jennings Randolph; Ranking Member: Robert T. Stafford)
  - Environmental Pollution (Chair: Edmund Muskie; Ranking Member: Robert T. Stafford)
  - Water Resources (Chair: Mike Gravel; Ranking Member: Pete Domenici)
  - Transportation (Chair: Lloyd Bentsen; Ranking Member: John H. Chafee)
  - Regional and Community Development (Chair: Quentin Burdick; Ranking Member: Howard H. Baker Jr.)
  - Nuclear Regulation (Chair: John Culver; Ranking Member: Malcolm Wallop)
- Ethics (Select) (Chair: Adlai Stevenson III)
- Finance (Chair: Russell B. Long; Ranking Member: Carl T. Curtis)
  - Health (Chair: Herman Talmadge; Ranking Member: Bob Dole)
  - International Trade (Chair: Abraham Ribicoff; Ranking Member: William V. Roth Jr.)
  - Taxation and Debt Management Generally (Chair: Harry F. Byrd Jr.; Ranking Member: Paul Laxalt)
  - Social Security (Chair: Gaylord Nelson; Ranking Member: Paul Laxalt)
  - Energy and Foundations (Chair: Mike Gravel; Ranking Member: Clifford P. Hansen)
  - Private Pension Plans and Employee Fringe Benefits (Chair: Lloyd Bentsen; Ranking Member: Bob Packwood)
  - Unemployment Compensation, Revenue Sharing and Economic Problems (Chair: William Hathaway; Ranking Member: William V. Roth Jr.)
  - Administration of the Internal Revenue Code (Chair: Floyd Haskell; Ranking Member: Bob Dole)
  - Tourism and Sugar (Chair: Spark Matsunaga; Ranking Member: Carl T. Curtis)
  - Public Assistance (Chair: Daniel Patrick Moynihan; Ranking Member: John C. Danforth)
- Foreign Relations (Chair: John Sparkman; Ranking Member: Clifford P. Case)
  - European Affairs (Chair: Joe Biden; Ranking Member: Robert P. Griffin)
  - East Asian and Pacific Affairs (Chair: John Glenn; Ranking Member: James B. Pearson)
  - International Operations (Chair: George McGovern; Ranking Member: Charles H. Percy)
  - Foreign Economic Policy (Chair: Frank Church; Ranking Member: Jacob K. Javits)
  - Arms Control, Oceans and International Environment (Chair: Claiborne Pell; Ranking Member: Charles H. Percy)
  - Western Hemisphere Affairs (Chair: Paul Sarbanes; Ranking Member: Jacob K. Javits)
  - Near Eastern and South Asian Affairs (Chair: Richard Stone; Ranking Member: Howard H. Baker Jr.)
  - Foreign Assistance (Chair: Hubert Humphrey; Ranking Member: Clifford P. Case)
  - African Affairs (Chair: Dick Clark; Ranking Member: Dick Clark)
- Governmental Affairs (Chair: Abraham Ribicoff; Ranking Member: Charles H. Percy)
  - Investigations (Chair: Henry M. Jackson; Ranking Member: Charles H. Percy)
  - Intergovernmental Relations (Chair: Edmund Muskie; Ranking Member: William V. Roth Jr.)
  - Reports, Accounting and Management (Chair: Lee Metcalf; Ranking Member: John C. Danforth)
  - Governmental Efficiency and the District of Columbia (Chair: Thomas Eagleton; Ranking Member: Charles Mathias)
  - Federal Spending Practices and Open Government (Chair: Lawton Chiles; Ranking Member: H. John Heinz III)
  - Energy, Nuclear Proliferation and Federal Services (Chair: John Glenn; Ranking Member: Jacob K. Javits)
  - Civil Service and General Services (Chair: Jim Sasser; Ranking Member: Ted Stevens)
- Human Resources (Chair: Harrison A. Williams; Ranking Member: Jacob K. Javits)
  - Labor (Chair: Harrison A. Williams; Ranking Member: Jacob K. Javits)
  - Handicapped (Chair: Jennings Randolph; Ranking Member: Robert T. Stafford)
  - Education, Arts and Humanities (Chair: Claiborne Pell; Ranking Member: Jacob K. Javits)
  - Employment, Poverty and Migratory Labor (Chair: Gaylord Nelson; Ranking Member: Richard S. Schweiker)
  - Health and Scientific Research (Chair: Ted Kennedy; Ranking Member: Richard S. Schweiker)
  - Aging (Chair: Thomas Eagleton; Ranking Member: John H. Chafee)
  - Child and Human Development (Chair: Alan Cranston; Ranking Member: S.I. Hayakawa)
  - Alcoholism and Drug Abuse (Chair: William Hathaway; Ranking Member: Orrin G. Hatch)
- Indian Affairs (Select) (Chair: James Abourezk)
- Judiciary (Chair: James Eastland; Ranking Member: Strom Thurmond)
- Intelligence (Select) (Chair: Daniel Inouye; Ranking Member: Mark Hatfield)
- Nutrition and Human Needs (Select) (Chair: George McGovern)
- Rules and Administration (Chair: Howard Cannon, then Claiborne Pell; Ranking Member: Mark O. Hatfield)
- Senate Committee System (Special)
- Small Business (Select) (Chair: Gaylord Nelson)
- Veterans' Affairs (Chair: Alan Cranston; Ranking Member: Robert T. Stafford)
  - Compensation and Pensions (Chair: Herman Talmadge; Ranking Member: Clifford P. Hansen)
  - Health and Readjustment (Chair: Alan Cranston; Ranking Member: Strom Thurmond)
  - Housing, Insurance and Cemeteries (Chair: Richard Stone; Ranking Member: Robert T. Stafford)
- Whole

=== House of Representatives ===
- Aging (Select) (Chair: Claude Pepper)
- Agriculture (Chair: Tom Foley; Ranking Member: William C. Wampler)
  - Livestock and Grains (Chair: William R. Poage; Ranking Member: Keith G. Sebelius)
  - Cotton (Chair: David R. Bowen; Ranking Member: W. Henson Moore)
  - Dairy and Poultry (Chair: Charlie Rose; Ranking Member: Jim Jeffords)
  - Family Farms and Rural Development (Chair: Rick Nolan; Ranking Member: Chuck Grassley)
  - Oilseeds and Rice (Chair: Dawson Mathis; Ranking Member: Paul Findley)
  - Tobacco (Chair: Walter B. Jones Sr.; Ranking Member: William C. Wampler)
  - Conservation and Credit (Chair: Ed Jones; Ranking Member: Edward Madigan)
  - Department, Investigations, Oversight and Research (Chair: Jamie Whitten; Ranking Member: Charles Thone)
  - Domestic Marketing, Consumer Relations and Nutrition (Chair: George H. Mahon; Ranking Member: Steve Symms)
  - Family Farms, Rural Development and Special Studies (Chair: Rick Nolan; Ranking Member: Chuck Grassley)
- Appropriations (Chair: George H. Mahon; Ranking Member: Elford Cederberg)
  - Agriculture and Related Agencies (Chair: Jamie Whitten; Ranking Member: Mark Andrews)
  - Defense (Chair: George H. Mahon; Ranking Member: Jack Edwards)
  - District of Columbia (Chair: William Natcher; Ranking Member: Clair W. Burgener)
  - Foreign Operations (Chair: Clarence Long; Ranking Member: Bill Young)
  - HUD-Independent Agencies (Chair: Edward Boland; Ranking Member: Lawrence Coughlin)
  - Interior (Chair: Sidney R. Yates; Ranking Member: Joseph M. McDade)
  - Labor-Health, Education and Welfare (Chair: Dan Flood; Ranking Member: Robert H. Michel)
  - Legislative (Chair: George E. Shipley; Ranking Member: William L. Armstrong)
  - Military Construction (Chair: K. Gunn McKay; Ranking Member: Robert C. McEwen)
  - Public Works (Chair: Tom Bevill; Ranking Member: John T. Myers)
  - State, Justice, Commerce and Judiciary (Chair: John M. Slack Jr.; Ranking Member: Elford Ceberberg)
  - Transportation (Chair: John J. McFall; Ranking Member: Silvio O. Conte)
  - Treasury, Postal Service and General Government (Chair: Tom Steed; Ranking Member: Clarence E. Miller)
- Armed Services (Chair: Melvin Price; Ranking Member: Bob Wilson)
  - Intelligence and Military Application of Nuclear Energy (Chair: Charles Melvin Price; Ranking Member: Bob Wilson)
  - Research and Development (Chair: Richard Howard Ichord Jr.; Ranking Member: William L. Dickinson)
  - Seapower, Strategic and Critical Materials (Chair: Charles E. Bennett; Ranking Member: Floyd Spence)
  - Investigations (Chair: Samuel S. Stratton; Ranking Member: Robin Beard)
  - Military Installations and Facilities (Chair: Lucien Nedzi; Ranking Member: G. William Whitehurst)
  - Military Personnel (Chair: Richard Crawford White; Ranking Member: David C. Treen)
  - Military Compensation (Chair: Bill Nichols; Ranking Member: Donald J. Mitchell)
- Assassinations (Select) (Chair: Louis Stokes)
- Banking, Finance and Urban Affairs (Chair: Henry S. Reuss; Ranking Member: J. William Stanton)
  - The City (Chair: Henry S. Reuss; Ranking Member: Richard Kelly)
  - Housing and Community and Development (Chair: Thomas L. Ashley; Ranking Member: Garry E. Brown)
  - Economic Stabilization (Chair: William S. Moorhead; Ranking Member: Stewart B. McKinney)
  - Financial Institutions Supervision, Regulation and Insurance (Chair: Fernand St. Germain; Ranking Member: John H. Rousselot)
  - International Development Institutions and Finance (Chair: Henry B. González; Ranking Member: Henry J. Hyde)
  - General Oversight and Renegotiation (Chair: Joseph Minish; Ranking Member: Chuck Grassley)
  - Consumer Affairs (Chair: Frank Annunzio; Ranking Member: Chalmers P. Wylie)
  - Domestic Monetary Policy (Chair: Parren Mitchell; Ranking Member: George V. Hansen)
  - Historic Preservation and Coinage (Chair: Walter Fauntroy; Ranking Member: Jim Leach)
  - International Trade, Investment and Monetary Policy (Chair: Stephen L. Neal; Ranking Member: J. William Stanton)
- Budget (Chair: Robert Giaimo; Ranking Member: Del Latta)
  - Budget Process (Chair: Butler Derrick; Ranking Member: Del Latta)
  - Economic Policy (Chair: Thomas L. Ashley; Ranking Member: Barber B. Conable Jr.)
  - Tax Expenditures, Government Organization and Regulation (Chair: Paul Simon; Ranking Member: Jim Broyhill)
  - Distributive Impacts of Budget and Economic Policies (Chair: Donald M. Fraser; Ranking Member: John H. Rousselot)
  - National Security (Chair: Robert L. Leggett; Ranking Member: Del Latta)
  - Human Resources (Chair: Parren Mitchell; Ranking Member: Clair W. Burgener)
  - Community and Physical Resources (Chair: Louis Stokes; Ranking Member: Clair W. Burgener)
  - State and Local Government (Chair: Elizabeth Holtzman; Ranking Member: John J. Duncan Sr.)
- Crime (Select) (Chair: [data missing]; Ranking Member: [data missing])
- District of Columbia (Chair: Charles Diggs; Ranking Member: Stewart B. McKinney)
  - Fiscal and Government Affairs (Chair: Stewart B. McKinney; Ranking Member: )
  - Judiciary (Chair: Romano Mazzoli; Ranking Member: Robert W. Daniel Jr.)
  - Economic Development (Chair: Herbert Harris; Ranking Member: Charles W. Whalen Jr.)
- Education and Labor (Chair: Carl D. Perkins; Ranking Member: Charles W. Whalen Jr.)
  - Elementary, Secondary and Vocational Education (Chair: Carl D. Perkins; Ranking Member: Al Quie)
  - Labor-Management Relations (Chair: Frank Thompson; Ranking Member: Al Quie)
  - Labor Standards (Chair: John Herman Dent; Ranking Member: John N. Erlenborn)
  - Select Education (Chair: John Brademas; Ranking Member: Jim Jeffords)
  - Employment Opportunities (Chair: Augustus Hawkins; Ranking Member: Ronald A. Sarasin)
  - Postsecondary Education (Chair: William D. Ford; Ranking Member: John Buchanan)
  - Compensation, Health and Safety (Chair: Joseph M. Gaydos; Ranking Member: Ronald A. Sarasin)
  - Economic Opportunity (Chair: Ike Franklin Andrews; Ranking Member: Bill Goodling)
- Ethics (Select) (Chair: H. Richardson Preyer)
- Government Operations (Chair: Jack Brooks; Ranking Member: Frank Horton)
  - Legislation and National Security (Chair: Jack Brooks; Ranking Member: Frank Horton)
  - Intergovernmental Relations and Human Resources (Chair: Lawrence H. Fountain; Ranking Member: John W. Wydler)
  - Commerce, Consumer and Monetary Affairs (Chair: Benjamin Stanley Rosenthal; Ranking Member: Garry E. Brown)
  - Environment, Energy and Natural Resources (Chair: Leo Ryan; Ranking Member: Thomas N. Kindness)
  - Manpower and Housing (Chair: Cardiss Collins; Ranking Member: Bob Kasten)
  - Government Activities and Transportation (Chair: John Burton; Ranking Member: Charles Thone)
  - Government Information and Individual Rights (Chair: L. Richardson Preyer; Ranking Member: Paul N. McCloskey Jr.))
- House Administration (Chair: Frank Thompson; Ranking Member: William L. Dickinson)
  - Accounts (Chair: John Herman Dent; Ranking Member: Samuel L. Devine)
  - Libraries and Memorials (Chair: Lucien Nedzi; Ranking Member: Samuel L. Devine)
  - Printing (Chair: Augustus Hawkins; Ranking Member: James C. Cleveland)
  - Personnel and Police (Chair: Frank Annunzio; Ranking Member: Samuel L. Devine)
  - Contracts (Chair: Joseph M. Gaydos; Ranking Member: James C. Cleveland)
  - Services (Chair: Ed Jones; Ranking Member: William L. Dickinson)
  - Office Systems (Chair: Bob Mollohan; Ranking Member: J. Herbert Burke)
- House Beauty Shop (Select) (Chair: Margaret Heckler; Ranking Member: )
- Intelligence (Select) (Chair: Edward Boland; Ranking Member: )
- Insular Affairs (Chair: Mo Udall; Ranking Member: Joe Skubitz)
  - Energy and the Environment (Chair: Mo Udall; Ranking Member: Robert E. Bauman)
  - General Oversight and Alaska Lands (Chair: John F. Seiberling; Ranking Member: Don Young)
  - Mines and Mining (Chair: Abraham Kazen); Ranking Member: Philip Ruppe
  - National Parks and Insular Affairs (Chair: Phillip Burton; Ranking Member: Keith G. Sebelius)
  - Indian Affairs and Public Lands (Chair: Teno Roncalio; Ranking Member: James P. Johnson)
  - Special Investigations (Chair: Harold L. Runnels; Ranking Member: Don H. Clausen)
  - Water and Power Resources (Chair: Lloyd Meeds; Ranking Member: Manuel Lujan Jr.)
- International Relations (Chair: Clement J. Zablocki; Ranking Member: William S. Broomfield)
  - International Security and Scientific Affairs (Chair: Clement J. Zablocki; Ranking Member: William S. Broomfield)
  - International Operations (Chair: Dante Fascell; Ranking Member: John Buchanan)
  - Africa (Chair: Charles Diggs; Ranking Member: Charles W. Whalen Jr.)
  - International Organizations (Chair: Donald M. Fraser); Ranking Member: Edward J. Derwinski)
  - Europe and the Middle East (Chair: Lee H. Hamilton; Ranking Member: Paul Findley)
  - Asian and Pacific Affairs (Chair: Lester L. Wolff; Ranking Member: J. Herbert Burke)
  - International Economic Policy and Trade (Chair: Jonathan Brewster Bingham; Ranking Member: Charles W. Whalen Jr.)
  - International Development (Chair: Michael Harrington; Ranking Member: Larry Winn Jr.)
- Interstate and Foreign Commerce (Chair: Harley Orrin Staggers; Ranking Member: Samuel L. Devine)
  - Oversight and Investigations (Chair: John E. Moss; Ranking Member: James M. Collins)
  - Energy and Power (Chair: John Dingell; Ranking Member: Clarence J. Brown)
  - Health and the Environment (Chair: Paul Rogers; Ranking Member: Tim Lee Carter)
  - Communications (Chair: Lionel Van Deerlin; Ranking Member: Louis Frey Jr.)
  - Transportation and Commerce (Chair: Fred B. Rooney; Ranking Member: Joe Skubitz)
  - Consumer Protection and Finance (Chair: Robert C. Eckhardt; Ranking Member: Jim Broyhill)
- Judiciary (Chair: Peter W. Rodino; Ranking Member: Robert McClory)
  - Immigration, Citizenship and International Law (Chair: Joshua Eilberg; Ranking Member: Hamilton Fish IV)
  - Administrative Law and Governmental Relations (Chair: George E. Danielson; Ranking Member: Carlos J. Moorhead)
  - Courts, Civil Liberties and the Administration of Justice (Chair: Robert Kastenmeier; Ranking Member: Thomas F. Railsback)
  - Civil and Constitutional Rights (Chair: Don Edwards; Ranking Member: M. Caldwell Butler)
  - Monopolies and Commercial Law (Chair: Peter W. Rodino; Ranking Member: Robert McClory)
  - Crime (Chair: John Conyers; Ranking Member: John M. Ashbrook)
  - Criminal Justice (Chair: James Mann; Ranking Member: Charles E. Wiggins)
- Merchant Marine and Fisheries (Chair: John M. Murphy; Ranking Member: Philip E. Ruppe)
  - Merchant Marine (Chair: John M. Murphy; Ranking Member: Paul N. McCloskey Jr.)
  - Fisheries, Wildlife Conservation and the Environment (Chair: Robert L. Leggett; Ranking Member: Edwin B. Forsythe)
  - Coast Guard and Navigation (Chair: Mario Biaggi; Ranking Member: David C. Treen)
  - Oceanography (Chair: John Breaux; Ranking Member: Joel Pritchard)
  - Panama Canal (Chair: Ralph Metcalfe; Ranking Member: Gene Snyder)
  - Maritime Education and Training (Ad Hoc) (Chair: Gerry Studds; Ranking Member: Don Young)
- Modernization of House Gallery Facilities (Special) (Chair: Joe D. Waggoner Jr.; Ranking Member: Edward J. Derwinski)
- Narcotics Abuse and Control (Select) (Chair: Lester L. Wolff)
- Outer Continental Shelf (Ad Hoc/Select) (Chair: John M. Murphy)
- Population (Select) (Chair: [data missing]; Ranking Member: [data missing])
- Post Office and Civil Service (Chair: Robert N. C. Nix Sr.; Ranking Member: Edward J. Derwinski)
  - Employee Ethics and Utilization (Chair: Pat Schroeder; Ranking Member: Benjamin A. Gilman)
  - Civil Service (Chair: Bill Clay; Ranking Member: Trent Lott)
  - Investigations (Chair: Robert N. C. Nix Sr.; Ranking Member: Edward J. Derwinski)
  - Compensations and Employee Benefits (Chair: Gladys Spellman; Ranking Member: Jim Leach)
  - Postal Operations and Services (Chair: James M. Hanley; Ranking Member: James M. Collins)
  - Census and Population (Chair: William Lehman; Ranking Member: John H. Rousselot)
  - Postal Personnel and Modernization (Chair: Charlie Wilson; Ranking Member: Gene Taylor)
- Public Works and Transportation (Chair: Harold T. Johnson; Ranking Member: Bill Harsha)
  - Aviation (Chair: Glenn M. Anderson; Ranking Member: Gene Snyder)
  - Economic Development (Chair: Robert A. Roe; Ranking Member: John Paul Hammerschmidt)
  - Investigations and Review (Chair: Ronald 'Bo' Ginn; Ranking Member: James C. Cleveland)
  - Public Buildings and Grounds (Chair: Norman Mineta; Ranking Member: William F. Walsh)
  - Surface Transportation (Chair: James J. Howard; Ranking Member: Bud Shuster)
  - Water Resources (Chair: Ray Roberts; Ranking Member: Don H. Clausen)
- Rules (Chair: James J. Delaney; Ranking Member: Don H. Clausen)
- Science and Technology (Chair: Olin E. Teague; Ranking Member: John W. Wydler)
  - Space Science and Applications (Chair: Don Fuqua; Ranking Member: Larry Winn Jr.)
  - Fossil and Energy Research, Development and Demonstration (Chair: Walter Flowers; Ranking Member: Larry Winn Jr.)
  - Advanced Energy Technologies, Energy Conservation, Development and Demonstration (Chair: Mike McCormack; Ranking Member: Barry M. Goldwater Jr.)
  - Environment and the Atmosphere (Chair: George Brown Jr.; Ranking Member: Manuel Lujan Jr.)
  - Transportation, Aviation and Weather (Chair: Dale Milford; Ranking Member: John W. Wydler)
  - Science, Research and Technology (Chair: Ray Thornton; Ranking Member: Harold C. Hollenbeck)
  - Domestic and International Scientific Planning, Analysis and Cooperation (Chair: James H. Scheuer; Ranking Member: Silvio O. Conte)
- Small Business (Chair: Neal Edward Smith; Ranking Member: Silvio O. Conte)
  - SBA and SBIC Authority and General Small Business (Chair: Neal Edward Smith; Ranking Member: Silvio O. Conte)
  - Minority Enterprise and General Oversight (Chair: Joseph P. Addabbo; Ranking Member: Joseph M. McDade)
  - Antitrust and Restraint of Trade Activities Affecting Small Business (Chair: John B. Breckinridge; Ranking Member: Tim Lee Carter)
  - Energy, Environment, Safety and Research (Chair: Alvin Baldus; Ranking Member: Tim Lee Carter)
  - Capital Investment and Business Opportunities (Chair: John J. LaFalce; Ranking Member: J. William Stanton)
  - Special Small Business Problems (Chair: Marty Russo; Ranking Member: William S. Broomfield)
- Standards of Official Conduct (Chair: L. Richardson Preyer; Ranking Member: Floyd Spence)
- Veterans' Affairs (Chair: Ray Roberts; Ranking Member: John Paul Hammerschmidt)
  - Compensation, Pension and Insurance (Chair: Sonny Montgomery; Ranking Member: Chalmers P. Wylie)
  - Education and Training (Chair: Olin E. Teague; Ranking Member: Margaret M. Heckler)
  - Medical Facilities and Benefits (Chair: David E. Satterfield III; Ranking Member: John Paul Hammerschmidt)
  - Housing (Chair: Jack Brinkley; Ranking Member: James Abdnor)
  - Cemeteries and Burial Benefits (Chair: Charles J. Carney; Ranking Member: Elwood Hillis)
- Ways and Means (Chair: Al Ullman; Ranking Member: Barber Conable Jr.)
  - Social Security (Chair: James A. Burke; Ranking Member: Bill Archer)
  - Health (Chair: Dan Rostenkowski; Ranking Member: John Duncan Sr.)
  - Trade (Chair: Charles Vanik; Ranking Member: William A. Steiger)
  - Public Assistance and Unemployment Compensation (Chair: James C. Corman; Ranking Member: Guy Vander Jagt)
  - Oversight (Chair: Sam Gibbons; Ranking Member: Phil Crane)
  - Miscellaneous Revenue Measures (Chair: Joe D. Waggoner Jr.; Ranking Member: Bill Frenzel)
- Whole

=== Joint committees ===
- Atomic Energy (Chair: Vacant; Vice Chair: Sen. Henry M. Jackson)
- Congressional Operations (Chair: Sen. Lee Metcalf; Vice Chair: Rep. Jack Brooks)
- Defense Productions (Chair: Sen. William Proxmire; Vice Chair: Rep. Parren Mitchell)
- Economic (Chair: Rep. Richard Walker Bolling; Vice Chair: Sen. Hubert H. Humphrey)
- Taxation (Chair: Rep. Al Ullman; Vice Chair: Sen. Russell B. Long)
- The Library (Chair: Rep. Lucien Nedzi; Vice Chair: Sen. Howard Cannon)
- Printing (Chair: Sen. Howard Cannon; Vice Chair: Rep. Frank Thompson Jr.)

== Employees ==
=== Legislative branch agency directors ===
- Architect of the Capitol: George Malcolm White
- Attending Physician of the United States Congress: Freeman H. Cary
- Comptroller General of the United States: Elmer B. Staats
- Director of the Congressional Budget Office: Alice M. Rivlin
- Librarian of Congress: Daniel J. Boorstin
- Public Printer of the United States: Thomas F. McCormick, until 1977
  - John J. Boyle, from 1977

=== Senate ===
- Chaplain: Edward L.R. Elson (Presbyterian)
- Curator: James R. Ketchum
- Historian: Richard A. Baker
- Parliamentarian: Murray Zweben
- Secretary: Francis R. Valeo, until March 31, 1977
  - J. Stanley Kimmitt, from March 31, 1977
- Librarian: Roger K. Haley
- Sergeant at Arms: Frank "Nordy" Hoffman
- Secretary for the Majority: J. Stanley Kimmitt, until March 31, 1977
  - James H. Duffy, from March 31, 1977
- Secretary for the Minority: William Hildenbrand

=== House of Representatives ===
- Chaplain: Edward G. Latch (Methodist)
- Clerk: Edmund L. Henshaw Jr.
- Doorkeeper: James T. Molloy
- Parliamentarian: William Holmes Brown
- Reading Clerks: Joe Bartlett (R) (until 1978)/Bob Berry (R) (from 1978), Charles W. Hackney Jr. (D)
- Postmaster: Robert V. Rota
- Sergeant at Arms: Kenneth R. Harding

== See also ==
- List of new members of the 95th United States Congress
- 1976 United States elections (elections leading to this Congress)
  - 1976 United States presidential election
  - 1976 United States Senate elections
  - 1976 United States House of Representatives elections
- 1978 United States elections (elections during this Congress, leading to the next Congress)
  - 1978 United States Senate elections
  - 1978 United States House of Representatives elections
