= Solar Photovoltaic Energy Research, Development, and Demonstration Act of 1978 =

US federal law regarding renewables

- Long title: An Act to provide for an accelerated program of research, development, and demonstration of solar photovoltaic energy technologies leading to early competitive commercial applicability of such technologies to be carried out by the Department of Energy, with the support of the National Aeronautics and Space Administration, the National Bureau of Standards, the General Services Administration, and other Federal agencies.
- Acronyms (colloquial): SPERDDA
- Enacted by: the 95th United States Congress
- Effective: November 4, 1978

Citations
- Public law: 95-590
- Statutes at Large: 92 Stat. 2513

Codification
- Titles amended: 42 U.S.C.: Public Health and Social Welfare
- U.S.C. sections created: 42 U.S.C. ch. 71, subch. III § 5581 et seq.

Legislative history
- Introduced in the House as H.R. 12874 by Mike McCormack (D–WA) on May 25, 1978; Committee consideration by House Science and Technology, Senate Commerce, Science, and Transportation; Passed the House on June 28, 1978 (385-14); Passed the Senate on October 10, 1978 (Passed, in lieu of S. 3392); Signed into law by President Jimmy Carter on November 4, 1978

Solar Photovoltaic Energy Research, Development, and Demonstration Act of 1978 is a United States statute authorizing the research and development of photovoltaic systems utilizing solar irradiance or sunlight as a source for electricity generation. The Act of Congress promotes energy conservation by the displacement of conventional energy systems dependent upon alternative fuel and fossil fuel resources.

The H.R. 12874 legislation was passed by the 95th U.S. Congressional session and enacted into law by the 39th President of the United States Jimmy Carter on November 4, 1978.

== Provisions of the Act ==
Title 42 United States Code Chapter 71 and Subchapter III was compiled as fourteen code of law sections based on U.S. Congressional findings regarding potential benefits of solar power and declaration of a renewable energy policy.

42 U.S.C. § 5581 - Congressional findings and declaration of policy
42 U.S.C. § 5582 - Definitions
42 U.S.C. § 5583 - Establishment and promotion of research, development, and demonstration programs
42 U.S.C. § 5584 - Federal assistance application procedures; selection of applicants; agreements; financial assistance; observation and monitoring of photovoltaic systems; reports; projects and activities
42 U.S.C. § 5585 - Contracts, grants and arrangements
42 U.S.C. § 5586 - Test procedures and performance criteria
42 U.S.C. § 5587 - Supervision of research, development, and demonstration programs
42 U.S.C. § 5588 - Solar Photovoltaic Energy Advisory Committee
42 U.S.C. § 5589 - Promotion and facilitation of practical use of photovoltaic energy
42 U.S.C. § 5590 - Submittal to Congressional committees of plan for demonstrating applications of photovoltaic systems and facilitating use in other nations; encouragement of international participation and cooperation; coordination and consistency of plan and international activities with similar activities and programs
42 U.S.C. § 5591 - Participation of small business concerns
42 U.S.C. § 5592 - Priorities
42 U.S.C. § 5593 - Construction with National Energy Conservation Policy Act
42 U.S.C. § 5594 - Authorization of appropriations

== Associated United States Federal Statute ==
United States legislation supportive of a solar energy program for the demonstration, development, and research in the United States.

Date of Enactment	Public Law Number	Statute Citation	Legislative Bill	Presidential Administration
October 26, 1974	P.L. 93-473	88 Stat. 1431	S. 3234	Gerald Ford

== See also ==
◇ Crystalline silicon	◇ Solar cell
◇ Energy conservation in the United States	◇ Solar power by country
◇ Growth of photovoltaics	◇ Solar power in the United States
◇ Photovoltaic power station	◇ Thin-film solar cell
◇ Renewable energy in the United States	◇ Timeline of solar cells

== United States Presidential Communiqués ==
☆ Carter, Jimmy E. (January 25, 1979). "The State of the Union ~ Annual Message to the Congress" [Energy, Solar Energy, and Other Energy Research, Development, and Demonstration]. Internet Archive. Washington, D.C.: National Archives and Records Service. pp. 147–149.
☆ "Jimmy Carter, Solar Energy Remarks Announcing Administration Proposals". The American Presidency Project ~ John Woolley and Gerhard Peters. University of California - Santa Barbara. June 20, 1979.
☆ "Jimmy Carter, Solar Energy Message to the Congress". The American Presidency Project ~ John Woolley and Gerhard Peters. University of California - Santa Barbara. June 20, 1979.
☆ Carter, Jimmy E. (June 20, 1979). "Solar Energy ~ Remarks Announcing Administration Proposals". Internet Archive. Washington, D.C.: National Archives and Records Service. pp. 1095–1096.
☆ Carter, Jimmy E. (June 20, 1979). "Solar Energy ~ Message to the Congress". Internet Archive. Washington, D.C.: National Archives and Records Service. pp. 1097–1107.
☆ Carter, Jimmy E. (January 21, 1980). "The State of the Union ~ Annual Message to the Congress" [Creating Energy Security, Energy Conservation, and Solar Energy]. Internet Archive. Washington, D.C.: National Archives and Records Service. pp. 130–131.

== Bibliography ==
- "Photovoltaic Conversion of Solar Energy for Terrestrial Applications". Internet Archive. National Aeronautics and Space Administration. 1973.
- "Opportunities to Improve Planning for Solar Energy Research and Development" (PDF). U.S. GAO ~ EMD-77-8. U.S. Government Accountability Office. November 30, 1976.
- "The Multiprogram Laboratories: A National Resource for Nonnuclear Energy Research, Development, and Demonstration" (PDF). U.S. GAO ~ EMD-78-62. U.S. Government Accountability Office. May 22, 1978.
- "Department of Energy Expenditures in Connection with Solar Energy Programs" (PDF). U.S. GAO ~ EMD-78-107. U.S. Government Accountability Office. September 7, 1978.
- "Opportunities for Improving Program Planning for Photovoltaic Research and Development" (PDF). U.S. GAO ~ EMD-79-40. U.S. Government Accountability Office. April 19, 1979.
- Carroll, Stephen (1979). "Proceedings: Photovoltaics User Review Panel" (PDF). National Renewable Energy Laboratory. Solar Energy Research Institute.
