= Emergency Petroleum Allocation Act =

United States law

- Long title: An Act to amend Public Law 93-60 to increase the authorization for appropriations to the Atomic Energy Commission in accordance with Section 261 of the Atomic Energy Act of 1954, as amended, and for other purposes.
- Acronyms (colloquial): EPAA
- Enacted by: the 93rd United States Congress
- Effective: November 27, 1973

Citations
- Public law: 93-159
- Statutes at Large: 87 Stat. 627

Legislative history
- Introduced in the Senate as S. 2645 by John O. Pastore (D–RI) on November 2, 1973; Committee consideration by Senate Joint Atomic Energy; Passed the Senate on November 9, 1973 (passed); Passed the House on November 13, 1973 (passed, in lieu of H.R. 11216); Signed into law by President Richard M. Nixon on November 27, 1973

The Emergency Petroleum Allocation Act of 1973 (EPAA) was a U.S. law that required the President to promulgate regulations to allocate and control price of petroleum products in response to the 1973 oil crisis.

It was reconsidered in the United States Senate's Emergency Petroleum Allocation Extension Act of 1974 and then extended by the Energy Policy and Conservation Act of 1975. The regulations were first decontrolled through a phase-in process by President Jimmy Carter in 1979, and then fully withdrawn by President Ronald Reagan with Executive Order 12287 of January 28, 1981.

In 1973 and again in 1979 the US Government took control of private stocks of oil under the law.
