= Energy Policy and Conservation Act =

US federal law concerning domestic fuel supply

Energy Policy and Conservation Act of 1975
- Long title: An Act to increase domestic energy supplies and availability; to restrain energy demand; to prepare for energy emergencies; and for other purposes.
- Acronyms (colloquial): EPCA
- Enacted by: the 94th United States Congress

Citations
- Public law: 94-163
- Statutes at Large: 89 Stat. 871

Legislative history
- Introduced in the Senate as S.622 by Henry M. Jackson (D–WA) on February 7, 1975; Passed the Senate on April 10, 1975 (60-25); Passed the House on September 23, 1975 (255-148); Reported by the joint conference committee on December 9, 1975; agreed to by the House on December 15, 1975 (300-103) and by the Senate on December 17, 1975 (58-40); Signed into law by President Gerald Ford on December 22, 1975

Major amendments
- National Energy Conservation Policy Act

The Energy Policy and Conservation Act of 1975 (EPCA) (Pub. L. 94–163, 89 Stat. 871, enacted December 22, 1975) is a United States Act of Congress that responded to the 1973 oil crisis by creating a comprehensive approach to federal energy policy. The primary goals of EPCA are to increase energy production and supply, reduce energy demand, provide energy efficiency, and give the executive branch additional powers to respond to disruptions in energy supply. Most notably, EPCA established the Strategic Petroleum Reserve, the Energy Conservation Program for Consumer Products, and Corporate Average Fuel Economy regulations.

== Strategic Petroleum Reserve ==
The need for a national oil storage reserve had been recognized for at least three decades. Secretary of the Interior Harold L. Ickes advocated the stockpiling of emergency crude oil in 1944. President Harry S Truman's Minerals Policy Commission proposed a strategic oil supply in 1952. President Dwight Eisenhower suggested an oil reserve after the 1956 Suez Crisis. The Cabinet Task Force on Oil Import Control recommended a similar reserve in 1970.

Few events so dramatically underscored the need for a strategic oil reserve as the 1973-74 oil embargo. U.S. support for the Israelis during the war of Arab-Israeli war of 1973 resulted in the 1973-74 oil embargo against the U.S. and other countries supporting the Israelis. The cutoff of oil flowing into the United States from OPEC sent economic shockwaves throughout the nation. The upcoming issues about energy skyrocketed to the top of the nation's agenda, which led to the creation of the Federal Energy Administration in 1974, renamed the U.S. Department of Energy in 1977. In the aftermath of the oil crises, the United States established the Strategic Petroleum Reserve (United States).

The EPCA declared it to be U.S. policy to establish a reserve of petroleum, setting the Strategic Petroleum Reserve (SPR) into motion, and extended the Emergency Petroleum Allocation Act of 1973 (EPAA). A number of existing storage sites were acquired in 1977. Construction of the first surface facilities began in June 1977. On July 21, 1977, the first oil—approximately 412,000 barrels (65,500 m^{3}) of Saudi Arabian light crude—was delivered to the SPR. Fill was suspended in FY 1995 to devote budget resources to refurbishing the SPR equipment and extending the life of the complex. The current SPR sites are expected to be usable until around 2025. Fill was resumed in 1999.

== Presidential Powers ==
The EPCA gave the president many new presidential powers. One of these includes the power to restrict the export of coal, petroleum products, petrochemical feedstocks, natural gas and materials or equipment for exploration, production, refining, or transportation of energy supplies. It also gave the president the authority to make exceptions to these restrictions if the president decided it was in the best interest of the nation or national security. If the president chose to exercise this power the president was required by the act to report to congress of these actions on a quarterly basis.

Another power the president is authorized to require the allocation of or priority performance under contracts that relates to supplies of materials and equipment in order to maximize domestic energy supplies. If the president finds that maintenance or more exploration, production, refining, transportation or conserving energy supplies or the construction and maintenance of energy facilities cannot reasonably be accomplished without exercising such authority. The EPCA also directs the President to report within 60 days, otherwise such authority will be administered. The EPCA also directs the Secretary of the Interior to take action within 30 days which prohibits the same previous fuel sources.

== Energy Efficiency ==
=== Corporate Average Fuel Economy ===
Part A of Title III of the EPCA established the Corporate Average Fuel Economy standards for automobiles. The average fuel economy for model years, 1978, 1979, and 1980 were set at 18, 19, and 20 miles per gallon, respectively, and by 1985 the average economy was required to be 27.5 mpg. Furthermore, automobiles were required to be labeled with their fuel economies, estimated fuel costs, and the range of fuel economy for comparable vehicles after the 1976 model year. The National Highway Traffic Safety Administration was given the authority to regulate fuel economies for automobiles and light trucks.

=== Energy Conservation Program for Consumer Products ===
Part B of Title III of the EPCA established the Energy Conservation Program, which gives the Department of Energy the "authority to develop, revise, and implement minimum energy conservation standards for appliances and equipment." As currently implemented, the Department of Energy currently enforces test procedures and minimum standards for more than 50 products covering residential, commercial and industrial, lighting, and plumbing applications.

== Crude oil export ban, 1977-2015 ==
The law has banned crude oil exports, with the U.S. Commerce Department able to grant exceptions for certain types of oil. In 1980, crude oil exports peaked at 104 million barrels, dropping to 43.8 million barrels in 2013. The exceptional export licenses were for oil from Cook Inlet, oil flowing through the Trans-Alaskan Pipeline System, oil exported to Canada, heavy oil from California, certain trades with Mexico, and some exceptions for re-exporting foreign oil. When oil is processed, e.g. distillation, it can be exported without a license. Although, the export ban was quoted as a reason why crude oil was discounted $10 below the world price from early 2014 throughout 2015, as measured by the West Texas Intermediate benchmark, this claim has not been supported by empirical research.

Oil producing companies and oil producing states, such as Texas, Alaska and North Dakota lobbied to lift the ban. Oil refineries have been against lifting the export ban, because their raw material, the sweet, light domestic crude was available at a low price.

In June 2015, the Obama administration had permitted the export of sweet, light oil for the import of heavy, sour oil from Mexico. Environmental groups have opposed lifting the ban because it would mean more oil sales, more drilling and more oil production with all its environmental impacts, increasing emissions of carbon dioxide and other pollutants.

On December 18, 2015, Congress lifted the 41-year-old ban. Republicans favored lifting the ban and in return agreed to not block a $500m payment to the UN Green Climate Fund and tax breaks for solar and wind power.

== Other provisions ==
The EPCA contained several policies to encourage the production of domestic energy sources. It authorized a program to promote coal production that would guarantee qualifying underground coal mining operations up to $30 million per project. The qualifying requirements are tailored to promote more environmentally friendly development and smaller coal producers. Recipients of the loan guarantees are required to have a contract with a customer who is certified by the Environmental Protection Agency to operate their plant in compliance with the Clean Air Act. At least 80% of the total guarantee amount must finance low-sulfur coal development. Finally, large coal or oil companies are prohibited from receiving loan guarantees.

Complementary to the increased coal production goals of the legislation, the EPCA also provided mechanisms to allow the government to ensure that natural gas and petroleum based fuels are available to consumers in times of fuel shortages or crises. The Federal Energy Administration's authority to require power plants to burn coal instead of natural gas or petroleum based fuels was extended through 1977. This mechanism would reduce the use of these fuels for power generation and free them for use by other consumers. Furthermore, the President was given authority to order maximum domestic oil and gas production, and the President was directed to submit plans for energy conservation and energy rationing in case of a fuel shortage.

== See also ==
- 1975 in the environment
- United States energy law
- United States energy policy
