= National Energy Conservation Policy Act =

US federal law concerning saving electricity

- Other short titles: National Energy Conservation Policy Act of 1978
- Long title: An Act for the relief of Jack R. Misner.
- Acronyms (colloquial): NECPA
- Nicknames: Federal Photovoltaic Utilization Act
- Enacted by: the 95th United States Congress
- Effective: November 9, 1978

Citations
- Public law: 95-619
- Statutes at Large: 92 Stat. 3206

Codification
- Acts amended: Energy Policy and Conservation Act of 1975
- Titles amended: 42 U.S.C.: Public Health and Social Welfare
- U.S.C. sections created: 42 U.S.C. ch. 91 § 8201 et seq.

Legislative history
- Introduced in the House as H.R. 5037 by Jack Kemp (R–NY) on March 14, 1977; Committee consideration by House Ways and Means, Senate Finance; Passed the House on July 18, 1978 (Passed); Passed the Senate on September 13, 1978 (Passed, in lieu of inserted S. 2057, amended S. 701, & certain provisions of H.R. 8444); Reported by the joint conference committee on October 6, 1978; agreed to by the Senate on October 9, 1978 (86-3) and by the House on October 14, 1978 (231-168); Signed into law by President Jimmy Carter on November 9, 1978

The National Energy Conservation Policy Act of 1978 (NECPA, Pub. L. 95–619, 92 Stat. 3206, enacted November 9, 1978) is a United States statute that was enacted as part of the National Energy Act.

The H.R. 5037 legislation was passed by the 95th U.S. Congressional session and enacted into law by the 39th President of the United States Jimmy Carter on November 9, 1978.

Energy demand management programs had been legislated earlier in California and Wisconsin as early as 1975.

== Amendments to 1978 Act ==
Chronological amendments to the National Energy Conservation Policy Act.

| Date of Enactment | Public Law Number | Statute Citation | Legislative Bill | Presidential Administration |
|---|---|---|---|---|
| August 3, 1982 | P.L. 97-229 | 96 Stat. 248 | S. 2332 | Ronald Reagan |
| August 29, 1986 | P.L. 99-413 | 100 Stat. 944 | H.R. 4843 | Ronald Reagan |
| March 17, 1987 | P.L. 100-12 | 101 Stat. 103 | S. 83 | Ronald Reagan |
| June 28, 1988 | P.L. 100-357 | 102 Stat. 671 | S. 2167 | Ronald Reagan |
| November 5, 1988 | P.L. 100-615 | 102 Stat. 3185 | S. 1382 | Ronald Reagan |

== See also ==
- Energy management
- Energy policy of the United States
- Home automation
- Solar Photovoltaic Energy Research, Development, and Demonstration Act of 1978
