= 94th United States Congress =

1975–1977 U.S. Congress

| ← | 93rd | 95th | → |
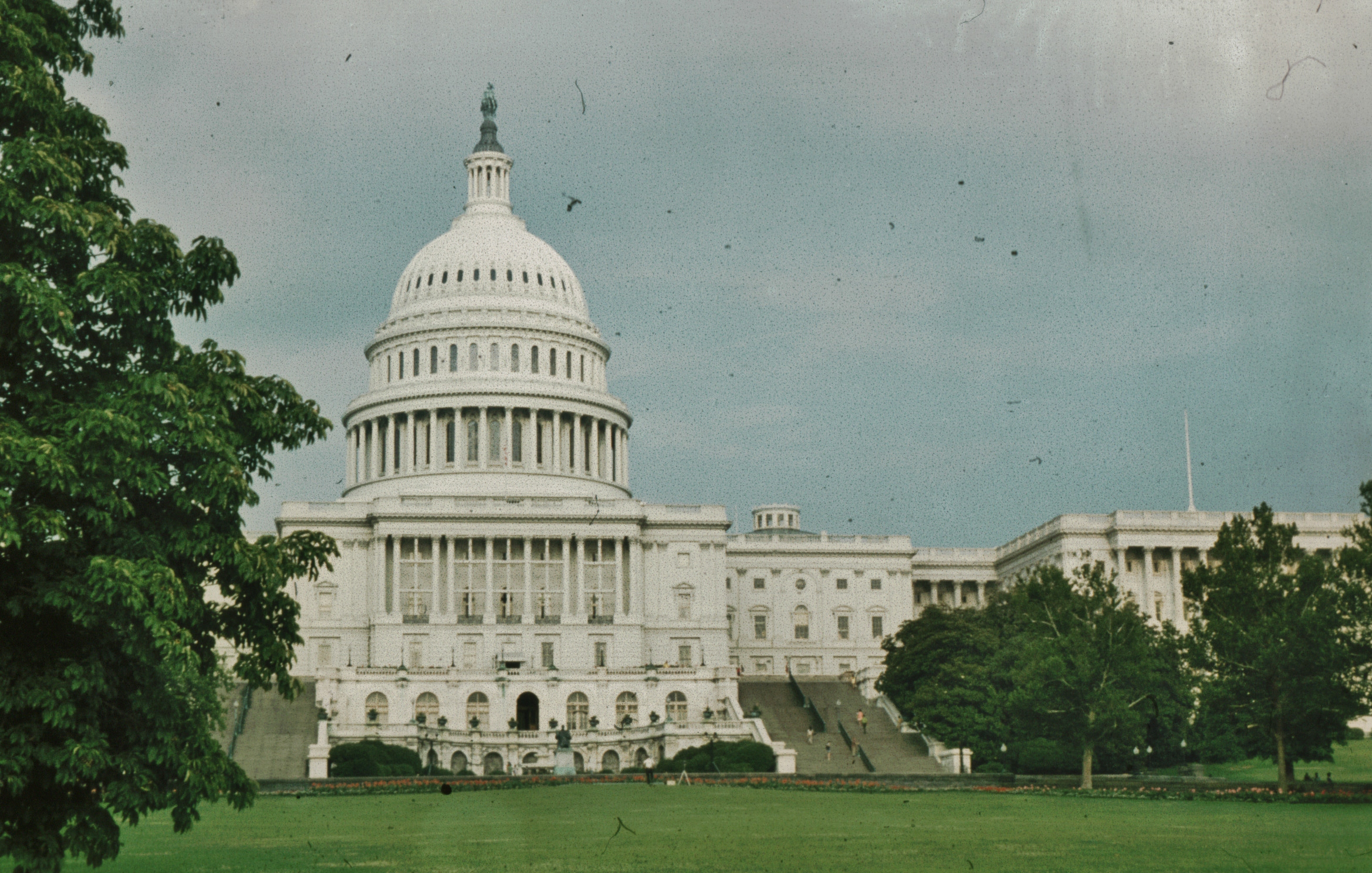
- United States Capitol (c. 1970)

Overview
- Legislative body: United States Congress
- Jurisdiction: United States
- Term: January 3, 1975 – January 3, 1977

Senate
- Members: 100
- President: Nelson Rockefeller (R)
- President pro tempore: James Eastland (D)
- Party control: Democratic

House of Representatives
- Members: 435 representatives 5 non-voting delegates
- Speaker: Carl Albert (D)
- Party control: Democratic

Sessions
- 1st: January 14, 1975 – December 19, 1975
- 2nd: January 19, 1976 – October 1, 1976

The 94th United States Congress was a meeting of the legislative branch of the United States federal government, composed of the United States Senate and the United States House of Representatives. It met in Washington, D.C., from January 3, 1975, to January 3, 1977, during the last two years of Gerald Ford's presidency.

This is the most recent Congress with a Republican senator from Hawaii, Hiram Fong, and Democratic senators from Utah and Wyoming, Frank Moss and Gale W. McGee. Fong retired and the other two lost re-election at the end of the 94th Congress. This is also the earliest Congress to feature members of the current 119th Congress, Chuck Grassley of Iowa and Ed Markey of Massachusetts (then as representatives, now as senators).

The apportionment of seats in this House of Representatives was based on the 1970 United States census. The Democrats not only maintained their majorities in the House and Senate, but would increase their numbers to supermajority status in both chambers.

== Major events ==
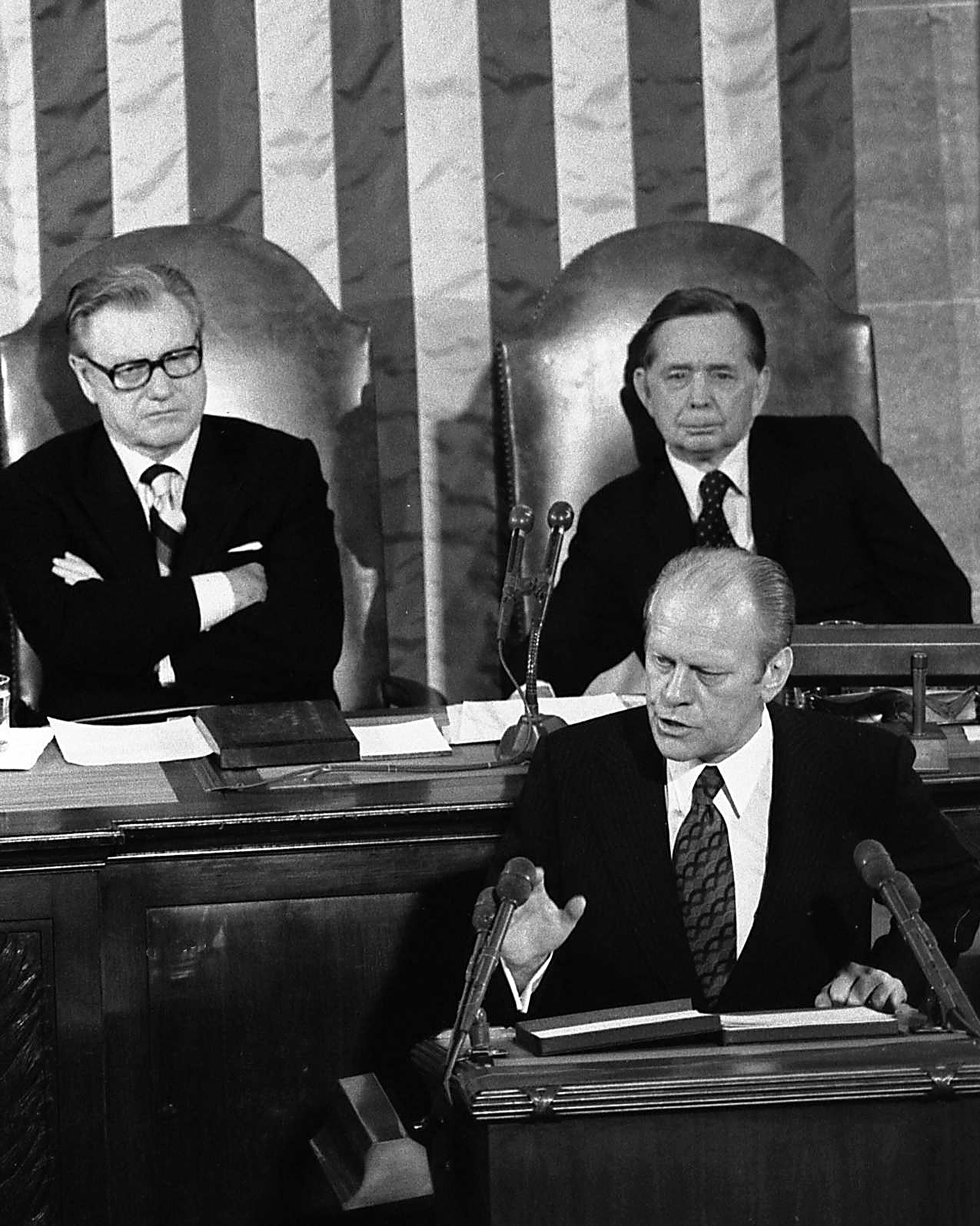
President Gerald Ford with Vice President Nelson Rockefeller and House Speaker Carl Albert during the 1975 State of the Union Address, January 15, 1975

- January 15, 1975: 1975 State of the Union Address
- April 30, 1975: Fall of Saigon
- June 10, 1975: The Rockefeller Commission issued its report on CIA abuses, recommending a joint congressional oversight committee on intelligence.
- September 5, 1975: Failed assassination attempt against President Ford by Lynette Fromme
- September 22, 1975: Another failed assassination attempt against President Ford by Sara Jane Moore
- July 4, 1976: United States Bicentennial
- November 2, 1976:
  - 1976 United States House of Representatives elections and 1976 United States Senate elections: Democrats retain congress
  - 1976 United States presidential election: Jimmy Carter (D) elected President
- December 12, 1976: Congressional Hispanic Caucus formed

== Major legislation ==
- March 29, 1975: Tax Reduction Act of 1975, Pub. L. 94–12, 89 Stat. 26
- May 23, 1975: Indochina Migration and Refugee Assistance Act, Pub. L. 94–23, 89 Stat. 87
- November 29, 1975: Education for All Handicapped Children Act, Pub. L. 94–142, 89 Stat. 773
- December 22, 1975: Energy Policy and Conservation Act, Pub. L. 94–163, 89 Stat. 871
- December 23, 1975: Metric Conversion Act, Pub. L. 94–168
- December 23, 1975: Revenue Adjustment Act (Earned Income Tax Credit), Pub. L. 94–164, 89 Stat. 970
- December 31, 1975: Home Mortgage Disclosure Act, Pub. L. 94–200, 89 Stat. 1124
- February 5, 1976: Railroad Revitalization and Regulatory Reform Act, Pub. L. 94–210, 90 Stat. 31
- April 13, 1976: Magnuson–Stevens Fishery Conservation and Management Act, Pub. L. 94–265, 90 Stat. 331
- May 11, 1976: Federal Election Campaign Act, Pub. L. 94–283, 90 Stat. 475
- June 30, 1976: Arms Export Control Act, Pub. L. 94–329, 90 Stat. 729
- September 13, 1976: Government in the Sunshine Act, Pub. L. 94–409, 90 Stat. 1241
- September 14, 1976: National Emergencies Act, Pub. L. 94–412, 90 Stat. 1255
- September 30, 1976: Hart-Scott-Rodino Antitrust Improvements Act, Pub. L. 94–435, 90 Stat. 1383
- October 11, 1976: Toxic Substances Control Act, Pub. L. 94–469, 90 Stat. 2003
- October 12, 1976: Overhaul of vocational education programs Pub. L. 94–482, 90 Stat. 2169
- October 19, 1976: Copyright Act of 1976, Pub. L. 94–553, 90 Stat. 2541
- October 21, 1976: Federal Land Policy and Management Act, Pub. L. 94–579, 90 Stat. 2744
- October 21, 1976: Resource Conservation and Recovery Act, Pub. L. 94–580, 90 Stat. 2795
- October 21, 1976: Foreign Sovereign Immunities Act, Pub. L. 94–583, 90 Stat. 2891
- October 22, 1976: National Forest Management Act, Pub. L. 94–588, 90 Stat. 2949

== Party summary ==
=== Senate ===
Final Senate membership 61 Democrats 37 Republicans 1 Independent 1 Conservative

| | Party (shading indicates majority caucus) | | | | Total | |
| | Democratic | Independent | Conservative | Republican | Total | Vacant |
|---|---|---|---|---|---|---|
| End of previous Congress | 56 | 1 | 1 | 40 | 98 | 2 |
| Begin (January 3, 1975) | 60 | 1 | 1 | 37 | 99 | 1 |
| August 8, 1975 (Note: In New Hampshire, Norris Cotton (R) was appointed on August 8, 1975, to temporarily serve until senator until the winner of the special election, John A. Durkin (D), was seated on September 18, 1975.) | 60 | 1 | 1 | 38 | 100 | 0 |
| September 18, 1975 | 61 | 1 | 1 | 37 | 100 | 0 |
| January 2, 1977 (Note: Membership changes, constituting six resignations and one death, following the 1976 elections resulted a one net increase in Republican seats. See #Changes in membership.) | 60 | 1 | 1 | 38 | 100 | 0 |
| Final voting share | 61% | | 39% | | | |
| Beginning of the next Congress | 61 | 1 | 0 | 38 | 100 | 0 |

=== House of Representatives ===
| | Party (shading indicates majority caucus) | | Total | |
| | Democratic | Republican | Total | Vacant |
|---|---|---|---|---|
| End of previous Congress | 232 | 174 | 406 | 29 |
| Begin | 291 | 144 | 435 | 0 |
| End | 287 | 146 | 433 | 2 |
| Final voting share | 66% | 34% | | |
| Beginning of the next Congress | 292 | 143 | 435 | 0 |

== Leadership ==
Makeup of the U.S. Senate at the start of this Congress, color-coded by party. Note: The orange stripes in New York and the green stripes in Virginia denote Conservative James Buckley and Independent Harry F. Byrd Jr., respectively.

Senate President

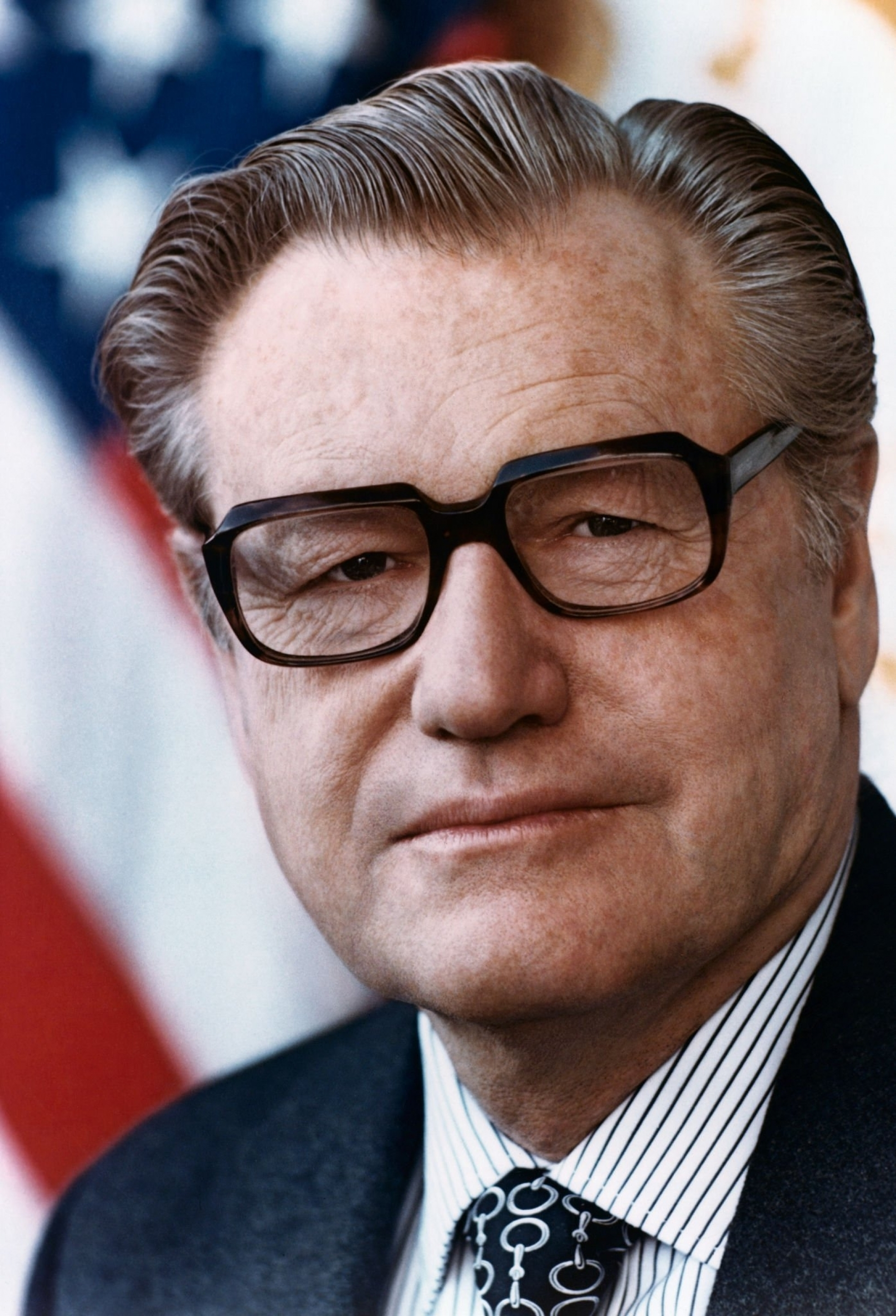
Nelson Rockefeller (R)

Senate President pro tempore

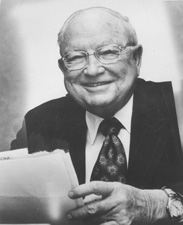
James Eastland (D)

House Speaker

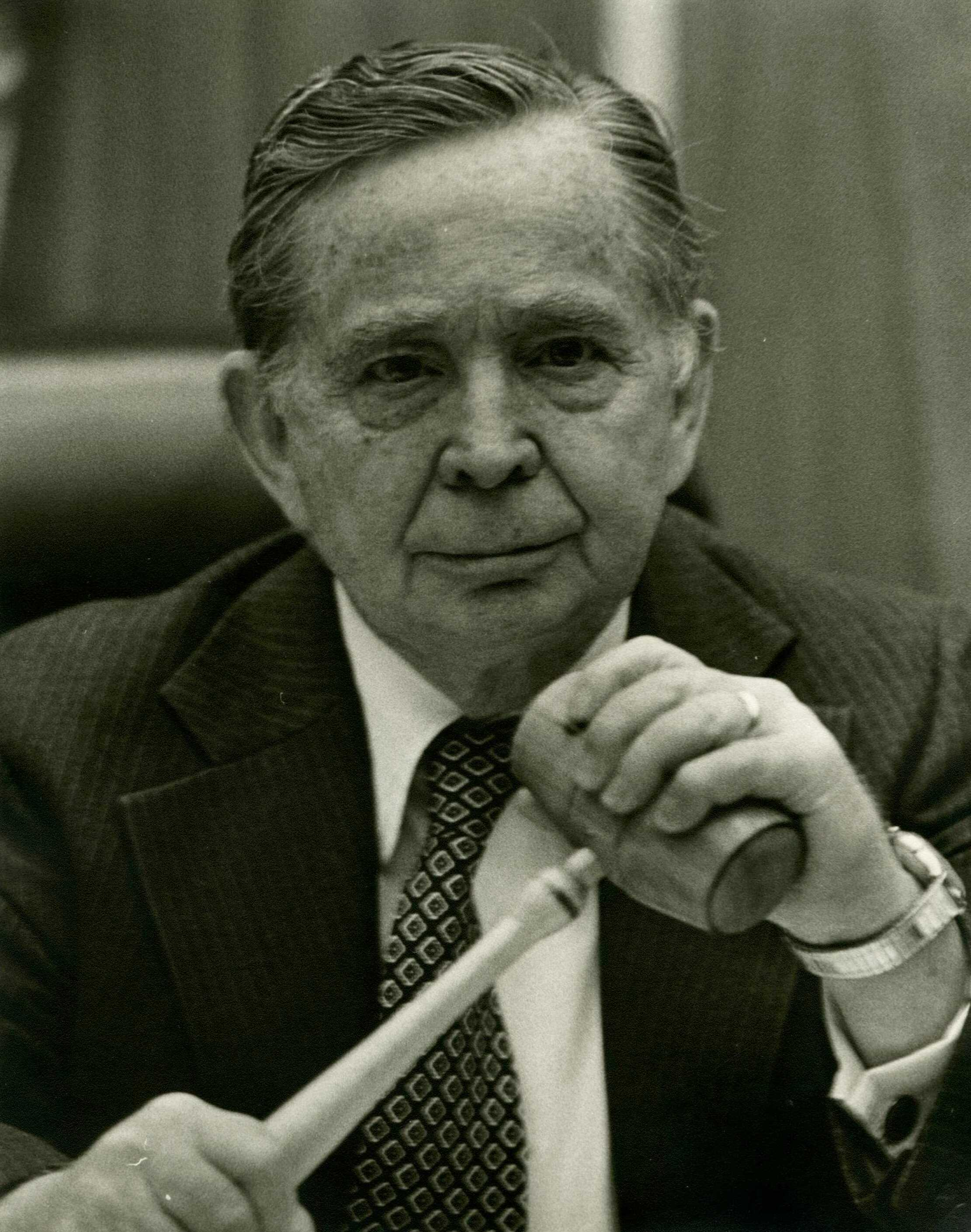
Carl Albert (D)

=== Senate ===
- President: Nelson Rockefeller (R)
- President pro tempore: James Eastland (D)
- Permanent Acting President pro tempore: Lee Metcalf (D)

==== Majority (Democratic) leadership ====
- Majority Leader: Mike Mansfield
- Majority Whip: Robert Byrd
- Democratic Caucus Secretary: Frank Moss
- Democratic Campaign Committee Chairman: J. Bennett Johnston

==== Minority (Republican) leadership ====
- Minority Leader: Hugh Scott
- Minority Whip: Robert P. Griffin
- Republican Conference Chairman: Carl Curtis
- Republican Conference Secretary: Robert Stafford
- National Senatorial Committee Chair: Ted Stevens
- Policy Committee Chairman: John Tower

=== House of Representatives ===
- Speaker: Carl Albert (D)

==== Majority (Democratic) leadership ====
- Majority Leader: Tip O'Neill
- Majority Whip: John J. McFall
- Chief Deputy Majority Whip: John Brademas
- Democratic Caucus Chairman: Phillip Burton
- Democratic Caucus Secretary: Patsy Mink
- Democratic Campaign Committee Chairman: Wayne Hays, until June 18, 1976
  - James C. Corman, from June 18, 1976

==== Minority (Republican) leadership ====
- Minority Leader: John Jacob Rhodes
- Minority Whip: Robert H. Michel
- Republican Conference Chairman: John B. Anderson
- Republican Conference Vice-Chairman: Samuel L. Devine
- Republican Conference Secretary: Jack Edwards
- Policy Committee Chairman: Barber Conable
- Republican Campaign Committee Chairman: Guy Vander Jagt

== Caucuses ==
- Congressional Black Caucus
- Congressional Hispanic Caucus
- House Democratic Caucus
- Senate Democratic Caucus

== Members ==
=== Senate ===
Senators are popularly elected statewide every two years, with one-third beginning new six-year terms with each Congress, In this Congress, Class 1 meant their term ended with this Congress, facing re-election in 1976; Class 2 meant their term began in the last Congress, facing re-election in 1978; and Class 3 meant their term began in this Congress, facing re-election in 1980.

==== Alabama ====
▌2. John J. Sparkman (D)
▌3. James Allen (D)

==== Alaska ====
▌2. Ted Stevens (R)
▌3. Mike Gravel (D)

==== Arizona ====
▌1. Paul Fannin (R)
▌3. Barry Goldwater (R)

==== Arkansas ====
▌2. John L. McClellan (D)
▌3. Dale Bumpers (D)

==== California ====
▌1. John V. Tunney (D) until January 1, 1977

▌S. I. Hayakawa (R) from January 2, 1977

▌3. Alan Cranston (D)

==== Colorado ====
▌2. Floyd Haskell (D)
▌3. Gary Hart (D)

==== Connecticut ====
▌1. Lowell Weicker (R)
▌3. Abraham Ribicoff (D)

==== Delaware ====
▌1. William Roth (R)
▌2. Joe Biden (D)

==== Florida ====
▌1. Lawton Chiles (D)
▌3. Richard Stone (D)

==== Georgia ====
▌2. Sam Nunn (D)
▌3. Herman Talmadge (D)

==== Hawaii ====
▌1. Hiram Fong (R)
▌3. Daniel Inouye (D)

==== Idaho ====
▌2. James A. McClure (R)
▌3. Frank Church (D)

==== Illinois ====
▌2. Charles H. Percy (R)
▌3. Adlai Stevenson III (D)

==== Indiana ====
▌1. Vance Hartke (D)
▌3. Birch Bayh (D)

==== Iowa ====
▌2. Dick Clark (D)
▌3. John Culver (D)

==== Kansas ====
▌2. James B. Pearson (R)
▌3. Bob Dole (R)

==== Kentucky ====
▌2. Walter Dee Huddleston (D)
▌3. Wendell Ford (D)

==== Louisiana ====
▌2. J. Bennett Johnston (D)
▌3. Russell B. Long (D)

==== Maine ====
▌1. Edmund Muskie (D)
▌2. William Hathaway (D)

==== Maryland ====
▌1. J. Glenn Beall Jr. (R)
▌3. Charles Mathias (R)

==== Massachusetts ====
▌1. Ted Kennedy (D)
▌2. Edward Brooke (R)

==== Michigan ====
▌1. Philip Hart (D), until December 26, 1976

▌Donald Riegle (D), from December 30, 1976

▌2. Robert P. Griffin (R)

==== Minnesota ====
▌1. Hubert Humphrey (DFL) (Note: The Minnesota Democratic–Farmer–Labor Party (DFL) and the North Dakota Democratic-Nonpartisan League Party (D-NPL) are the Minnesota and North Dakota affiliates of the U.S. Democratic Party and are counted as Democrats.)
▌2. Walter Mondale (DFL), until December 30, 1976

▌Wendell R. Anderson (DFL), from December 30, 1976

==== Mississippi ====
▌1. John C. Stennis (D)
▌2. James Eastland (D)

==== Missouri ====
▌1. Stuart Symington (D), until December 27, 1976

▌John Danforth (R), from December 27, 1976

▌3. Thomas Eagleton (D)

==== Montana ====
▌1. Mike Mansfield (D)
▌2. Lee Metcalf (D)

==== Nebraska ====
▌1. Roman Hruska (R), until December 27, 1976

▌Edward Zorinsky (D), from December 28, 1976

▌2. Carl Curtis (R)

==== Nevada ====
▌1. Howard Cannon (D)
▌3. Paul Laxalt (R)

==== New Hampshire ====
▌2. Thomas J. McIntyre (D)
▌3. Norris Cotton (R), from August 8, 1975, until September 18, 1975

▌John A. Durkin (D), from September 18, 1975

==== New Jersey ====
▌1. Harrison A. Williams (D)
▌2. Clifford P. Case (R)

==== New Mexico ====
▌1. Joseph Montoya (D)
▌2. Pete Domenici (R)

==== New York ====
▌1. James L. Buckley (C)
▌3. Jacob Javits (R)

==== North Carolina ====
▌2. Jesse Helms (R)
▌3. Robert Burren Morgan (D)

==== North Dakota ====
▌1. Quentin Burdick (D-NPL)
▌3. Milton Young (R)

==== Ohio ====
▌1. Robert Taft Jr. (R), until December 28, 1976

▌Howard Metzenbaum (D), from December 29, 1976

▌3. John Glenn (D)

==== Oklahoma ====
▌2. Dewey F. Bartlett (R)
▌3. Henry Bellmon (R)

==== Oregon ====
▌2. Mark Hatfield (R)
▌3. Bob Packwood (R)

==== Pennsylvania ====
▌1. Hugh Scott (R)
▌3. Richard Schweiker (R)

==== Rhode Island ====
▌1. John Pastore (D), until December 28, 1976

▌John Chafee (R), from December 29, 1976

▌2. Claiborne Pell (D)

==== South Carolina ====
▌2. Strom Thurmond (R)
▌3. Fritz Hollings (D)

==== South Dakota ====
▌2. James Abourezk (D)
▌3. George McGovern (D)

==== Tennessee ====
▌1. Bill Brock (R)
▌2. Howard Baker (R)

==== Texas ====
▌1. Lloyd Bentsen (D)
▌2. John Tower (R)

==== Utah ====
▌1. Frank Moss (D)
▌3. Jake Garn (R)

==== Vermont ====
▌1. Robert Stafford (R)
▌3. Patrick Leahy (D)

==== Virginia ====
▌1. Harry F. Byrd Jr. (ID)
▌2. William L. Scott (R)

==== Washington ====
▌1. Henry M. Jackson (D)
▌3. Warren G. Magnuson (D)

==== West Virginia ====
▌1. Robert Byrd (D)
▌2. Jennings Randolph (D)

==== Wisconsin ====
▌1. William Proxmire (D)
▌3. Gaylord Nelson (D)

==== Wyoming ====
▌1. Gale W. McGee (D)
▌2. Clifford Hansen (R)

Senate majority leadership

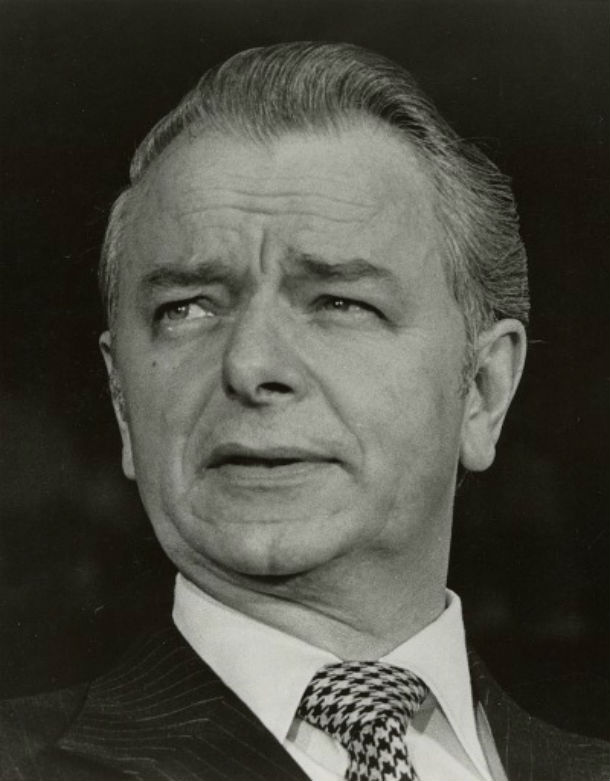
Democratic whip
Robert Byrd

Senate minority leadership

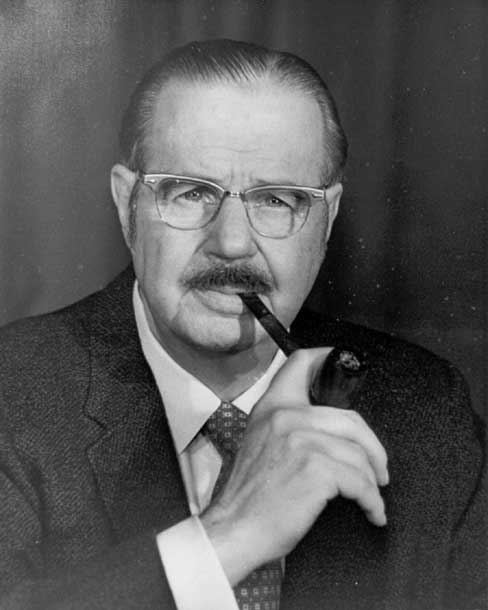
Republican leader
Hugh Scott

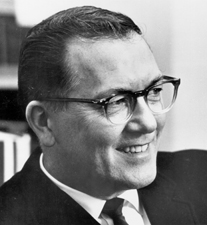
Republican whip
Robert P. Griffin

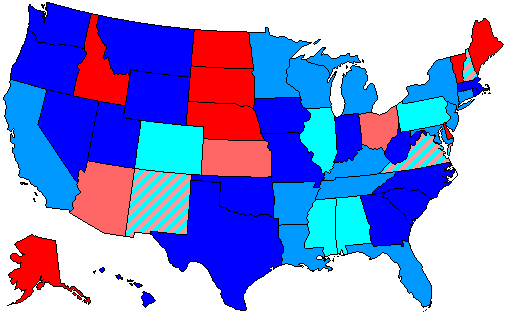
House seats by party holding plurality in state: 80+% to 100% Republican / 80+% to 100% Democratic; 60+% to 80% Republican / 60+% to 80% Democratic; Up to 60% Republican / Up to 60% Democratic

=== House of Representatives ===
Many of the congressional districts are linked to articles describing the district itself. Since the boundaries of the districts have changed often and substantially, the linked article may only describe the district as it exists today, and not as it was at the time of this Congress.

==== Alabama ====
▌1. Jack Edwards (R)
▌2. William Louis Dickinson (R)
▌3. Bill Nichols (D)
▌4. Tom Bevill (D)
▌5. Robert E. Jones Jr. (D)
▌6. John Hall Buchanan Jr. (R)
▌7. Walter Flowers (D)

==== Alaska ====
▌At-large. Don Young (R)

==== Arizona ====
▌1. John Jacob Rhodes (R)
▌2. Mo Udall (D)
▌3. Sam Steiger (R)
▌4. John Bertrand Conlan (R)

==== Arkansas ====
▌1. William Vollie Alexander Jr. (D)
▌2. Wilbur Mills (D)
▌3. John Paul Hammerschmidt (R)
▌4. Ray Thornton (D)

==== California ====
▌1. Harold T. Johnson (D)
▌2. Donald H. Clausen (R)
▌3. John E. Moss (D)
▌4. Robert L. Leggett (D)
▌5. John Burton (D)
▌6. Phillip Burton (D)
▌7. George Miller (D)
▌8. Ron Dellums (D)
▌9. Pete Stark (D)
▌10. Don Edwards (D)
▌11. Leo Ryan (D)
▌12. Pete McCloskey (R)
▌13. Norman Mineta (D)
▌14. John J. McFall (D)
▌15. B. F. Sisk (D)
▌16. Burt Talcott (R)
▌17. John Hans Krebs (D)
▌18. William M. Ketchum (R)
▌19. Robert J. Lagomarsino (R)
▌20. Barry Goldwater Jr. (R)
▌21. James C. Corman (D)
▌22. Carlos Moorhead (R)
▌23. Thomas M. Rees (D)
▌24. Henry Waxman (D)
▌25. Edward R. Roybal (D)
▌26. John H. Rousselot (R)
▌27. Alphonzo E. Bell Jr. (R)
▌28. Yvonne Brathwaite Burke (D)
▌29. Augustus Hawkins (D)
▌30. George E. Danielson (D)
▌31. Charles H. Wilson (D)
▌32. Glenn M. Anderson (D)
▌33. Del M. Clawson (R)
▌34. Mark W. Hannaford (D)
▌35. James F. Lloyd (D)
▌36. George Brown Jr. (D)
▌37. Jerry Pettis (R), until February 14, 1975

▌Shirley Neil Pettis (R), from April 29, 1975

▌38. Jerry M. Patterson (D)
▌39. Charles E. Wiggins (R)
▌40. Andrew J. Hinshaw (R)
▌41. Bob Wilson (R)
▌42. Lionel Van Deerlin (D)
▌43. Clair Burgener (R)

==== Colorado ====
▌1. Pat Schroeder (D)
▌2. Tim Wirth (D)
▌3. Frank Evans (D)
▌4. James Paul Johnson (R)
▌5. William L. Armstrong (R)

==== Connecticut ====
▌1. William R. Cotter (D)
▌2. Chris Dodd (D)
▌3. Robert Giaimo (D)
▌4. Stewart McKinney (R)
▌5. Ronald A. Sarasin (R)
▌6. Toby Moffett (D)

==== Delaware ====
▌At-large. Pete duPont (R)

==== Florida ====
▌1. Robert L. F. Sikes (D)
▌2. Don Fuqua (D)
▌3. Charles E. Bennett (D)
▌4. Bill Chappell (D)
▌5. Richard Kelly (R)
▌6. Bill Young (R)
▌7. Sam Gibbons (D)
▌8. James A. Haley (D)
▌9. Louis Frey Jr. (R)
▌10. Skip Bafalis (R)
▌11. Paul Rogers (D)
▌12. J. Herbert Burke (R)
▌13. William Lehman (D)
▌14. Claude Pepper (D)
▌15. Dante Fascell (D)

==== Georgia ====
▌1. Bo Ginn (D)
▌2. Dawson Mathis (D)
▌3. Jack Brinkley (D)
▌4. Elliott H. Levitas (D)
▌5. Andrew Young (D)
▌6. John Flynt (D)
▌7. Larry McDonald (D)
▌8. W. S. Stuckey Jr. (D)
▌9. Phillip M. Landrum (D)
▌10. Robert Grier Stephens Jr. (D)

==== Hawaii ====
▌1. Spark Matsunaga (D)
▌2. Patsy Mink (D)

==== Idaho ====
▌1. Steve Symms (R)
▌2. George V. Hansen (R)

==== Illinois ====
▌1. Ralph Metcalfe (D)
▌2. Morgan F. Murphy (D)
▌3. Marty Russo (D)
▌4. Ed Derwinski (R)
▌5. John C. Kluczynski (D), until January 26, 1975

▌John G. Fary (D), from July 8, 1975

▌6. Henry Hyde (R)
▌7. Cardiss Collins (D)
▌8. Dan Rostenkowski (D)
▌9. Sidney R. Yates (D)
▌10. Abner J. Mikva (D)
▌11. Frank Annunzio (D)
▌12. Phil Crane (R)
▌13. Robert McClory (R)
▌14. John N. Erlenborn (R)
▌15. Tim Lee Hall (D)
▌16. John B. Anderson (R)
▌17. George M. O'Brien (R)
▌18. Robert H. Michel (R)
▌19. Tom Railsback (R)
▌20. Paul Findley (R)
▌21. Edward Rell Madigan (R)
▌22. George E. Shipley (D)
▌23. Melvin Price (D)
▌24. Paul Simon (D)

==== Indiana ====
▌1. Ray Madden (D)
▌2. Floyd Fithian (D)
▌3. John Brademas (D)
▌4. J. Edward Roush (D)
▌5. Elwood Hillis (R)
▌6. David W. Evans (D)
▌7. John T. Myers (R)
▌8. Philip H. Hayes (D)
▌9. Lee H. Hamilton (D)
▌10. Philip Sharp (D)
▌11. Andrew Jacobs Jr. (D)

==== Iowa ====
▌1. Edward Mezvinsky (D)
▌2. Mike Blouin (D)
▌3. Chuck Grassley (R)
▌4. Neal Edward Smith (D)
▌5. Tom Harkin (D)
▌6. Berkley Bedell (D)

==== Kansas ====
▌1. Keith Sebelius (R)
▌2. Martha Keys (D)
▌3. Larry Winn (R)
▌4. Garner E. Shriver (R)
▌5. Joe Skubitz (R)

==== Kentucky ====
▌1. Carroll Hubbard (D)
▌2. William Natcher (D)
▌3. Romano Mazzoli (D)
▌4. Gene Snyder (R)
▌5. Tim Lee Carter (R)
▌6. John B. Breckinridge (D)
▌7. Carl D. Perkins (D)

==== Louisiana ====
▌1. F. Edward Hébert (D)
▌2. Lindy Boggs (D)
▌3. Dave Treen (R)
▌4. Joe Waggonner (D)
▌5. Otto Passman (D)
▌6. Henson Moore (R)
▌7. John Breaux (D)
▌8. Gillis William Long (D)

==== Maine ====
▌1. David F. Emery (R)
▌2. William Cohen (R)

==== Maryland ====
▌1. Robert Bauman (R)
▌2. Clarence Long (D)
▌3. Paul Sarbanes (D)
▌4. Marjorie Holt (R)
▌5. Gladys Spellman (D)
▌6. Goodloe Byron (D)
▌7. Parren Mitchell (D)
▌8. Gilbert Gude (R)

==== Massachusetts ====
▌1. Silvio O. Conte (R)
▌2. Edward Boland (D)
▌3. Joseph D. Early (D)
▌4. Robert Drinan (D)
▌5. Paul Tsongas (D)
▌6. Michael J. Harrington (D)
▌7. Torbert Macdonald (D), until May 21, 1976

▌Ed Markey (D), from November 2, 1976

▌8. Tip O'Neill (D)
▌9. Joe Moakley (D)
▌10. Margaret Heckler (R)
▌11. James A. Burke (D)
▌12. Gerry Studds (D)

==== Michigan ====
▌1. John Conyers (D)
▌2. Marvin L. Esch (R)
▌3. Garry E. Brown (R)
▌4. J. Edward Hutchinson (R)
▌5. Richard Vander Veen (D)
▌6. Milton Robert Carr (D)
▌7. Donald Riegle (D), until December 30, 1976
▌8. J. Bob Traxler (D)
▌9. Guy Vander Jagt (R)
▌10. Elford Albin Cederberg (R)
▌11. Philip Ruppe (R)
▌12. James G. O'Hara (D)
▌13. Charles Diggs (D)
▌14. Lucien Nedzi (D)
▌15. William D. Ford (D)
▌16. John D. Dingell Jr. (D)
▌17. William M. Brodhead (D)
▌18. James Blanchard (D)
▌19. William Broomfield (R)

==== Minnesota ====
▌1. Al Quie (R)/(I-R) (Note: The Republican Party of Minnesota changed its name to the Independent-Republicans of Minnesota on November 15, 1975. As such, Independent-Republicans from Minnesota are counted as Republicans.)
▌2. Tom Hagedorn (R)/(I-R)
▌3. Bill Frenzel (R)/(I-R)
▌4. Joseph Karth (DFL)
▌5. Donald M. Fraser (DFL)
▌6. Rick Nolan (DFL)
▌7. Robert Bergland (DFL)
▌8. Jim Oberstar (DFL)

==== Mississippi ====
▌1. Jamie L. Whitten (D)
▌2. David R. Bowen (D)
▌3. Sonny Montgomery (D)
▌4. Thad Cochran (R)
▌5. Trent Lott (R)

==== Missouri ====
▌1. Bill Clay (D)
▌2. James W. Symington (D)
▌3. Leonor Sullivan (D)
▌4. William J. Randall (D)
▌5. Richard Walker Bolling (D)
▌6. Jerry Litton (D), until August 3, 1976

▌Tom Coleman (R), from November 2, 1976

▌7. Gene Taylor (R)
▌8. Richard Howard Ichord Jr. (D)
▌9. William L. Hungate (D)
▌10. Bill Burlison (D)

==== Montana ====
▌1. Max Baucus (D)
▌2. John Melcher (D)

==== Nebraska ====
▌1. Charles Thone (R)
▌2. John Y. McCollister (R)
▌3. Virginia D. Smith (R)

==== Nevada ====
▌At-large. James David Santini (D)

==== New Hampshire ====
▌1. Norman D'Amours (D)
▌2. James Colgate Cleveland (R)

==== New Jersey ====
▌1. James Florio (D)
▌2. William J. Hughes (D)
▌3. James J. Howard (D)
▌4. Frank Thompson (D)
▌5. Millicent Fenwick (R)
▌6. Edwin B. Forsythe (R)
▌7. Andrew Maguire (D)
▌8. Robert A. Roe (D)
▌9. Henry Helstoski (D)
▌10. Peter W. Rodino (D)
▌11. Joseph Minish (D)
▌12. Matthew John Rinaldo (R)
▌13. Helen Stevenson Meyner (D)
▌14. Dominick V. Daniels (D)
▌15. Edward J. Patten (D)

==== New Mexico ====
▌1. Manuel Lujan Jr. (R)
▌2. Harold L. Runnels (D)

==== New York ====
▌1. Otis G. Pike (D)
▌2. Thomas Downey (D)
▌3. Jerome Ambro (D)
▌4. Norman F. Lent (R)
▌5. John W. Wydler (R)
▌6. Lester L. Wolff (D)
▌7. Joseph P. Addabbo (D)
▌8. Benjamin Stanley Rosenthal (D)
▌9. James J. Delaney (D)
▌10. Mario Biaggi (D)
▌11. James H. Scheuer (D)
▌12. Shirley Chisholm (D)
▌13. Stephen Solarz (D)
▌14. Fred Richmond (D)
▌15. Leo C. Zeferetti (D)
▌16. Elizabeth Holtzman (D)
▌17. John M. Murphy (D)
▌18. Ed Koch (D)
▌19. Charles Rangel (D)
▌20. Bella Abzug (D)
▌21. Herman Badillo (D)
▌22. Jonathan Brewster Bingham (D)
▌23. Peter A. Peyser (R)
▌24. Richard Ottinger (D)
▌25. Hamilton Fish IV (R)
▌26. Benjamin Gilman (R)
▌27. Matthew F. McHugh (D)
▌28. Samuel S. Stratton (D)
▌29. Edward W. Pattison (D)
▌30. Robert C. McEwen (R)
▌31. Donald J. Mitchell (R)
▌32. James M. Hanley (D)
▌33. William F. Walsh (R)
▌34. Frank Horton (R)
▌35. Barber Conable (R)
▌36. John J. LaFalce (D)
▌37. Henry J. Nowak (D)
▌38. Jack Kemp (R)
▌39. James F. Hastings (R), until January 20, 1976

▌Stan Lundine (D), from March 2, 1976

==== North Carolina ====
▌1. Walter B. Jones Sr. (D)
▌2. Lawrence H. Fountain (D)
▌3. David N. Henderson (D)
▌4. Ike Franklin Andrews (D)
▌5. Stephen L. Neal (D)
▌6. L. Richardson Preyer (D)
▌7. Charlie Rose (D)
▌8. Bill Hefner (D)
▌9. James G. Martin (R)
▌10. Jim Broyhill (R)
▌11. Roy A. Taylor (D)

==== North Dakota ====
▌At-large. Mark Andrews (R)

==== Ohio ====
▌1. Bill Gradison (R)
▌2. Donald D. Clancy (R)
▌3. Charles W. Whalen Jr. (R)
▌4. Tennyson Guyer (R)
▌5. Del Latta (R)
▌6. Bill Harsha (R)
▌7. Bud Brown (R)
▌8. Tom Kindness (R)
▌9. Thomas L. Ashley (D)
▌10. Clarence E. Miller (R)
▌11. J. William Stanton (R)
▌12. Samuel L. Devine (R)
▌13. Charles Adams Mosher (R)
▌14. John F. Seiberling (D)
▌15. Chalmers Wylie (R)
▌16. Ralph Regula (R)
▌17. John M. Ashbrook (R)
▌18. Wayne Hays (D), until September 1, 1976
▌19. Charles J. Carney (D)
▌20. James V. Stanton (D)
▌21. Louis Stokes (D)
▌22. Charles Vanik (D)
▌23. Ronald M. Mottl (D)

==== Oklahoma ====
▌1. James R. Jones (D)
▌2. Ted Risenhoover (D)
▌3. Carl Albert (D)
▌4. Tom Steed (D)
▌▌5. John Jarman (D) to (R), January 23, 1975
▌6. Glenn English (D)

==== Oregon ====
▌1. Les AuCoin (D)
▌2. Al Ullman (D)
▌3. Robert B. Duncan (D)
▌4. Jim Weaver (D)

==== Pennsylvania ====
▌1. William A. Barrett (D), until April 12, 1976

▌Michael Myers (D), from November 2, 1976

▌2. Robert N. C. Nix Sr. (D)
▌3. William J. Green III (D)
▌4. Joshua Eilberg (D)
▌5. Richard T. Schulze (R)
▌6. Gus Yatron (D)
▌7. Robert W. Edgar (D)
▌8. Edward G. Biester Jr. (R)
▌9. Bud Shuster (R)
▌10. Joseph M. McDade (R)
▌11. Dan Flood (D)
▌12. John Murtha (D)
▌13. Lawrence Coughlin (R)
▌14. William S. Moorhead (D)
▌15. Fred B. Rooney (D)
▌16. Edwin Duing Eshleman (R)
▌17. Herman T. Schneebeli (R)
▌18. John Heinz (R)
▌19. William F. Goodling (R)
▌20. Joseph M. Gaydos (D)
▌21. John Herman Dent (D)
▌22. Thomas E. Morgan (D)
▌23. Albert W. Johnson (R)
▌24. Joseph P. Vigorito (D)
▌25. Gary A. Myers (R)

==== Rhode Island ====
▌1. Fernand St Germain (D)
▌2. Edward Beard (D)

==== South Carolina ====
▌1. Mendel Jackson Davis (D)
▌2. Floyd Spence (R)
▌3. Butler Derrick (D)
▌4. James Mann (D)
▌5. Kenneth Lamar Holland (D)
▌6. John Jenrette (D)

==== South Dakota ====
▌1. Larry Pressler (R)
▌2. James Abdnor (R)

==== Tennessee ====
▌1. Jimmy Quillen (R)
▌2. John Duncan Sr. (R)
▌3. Marilyn Lloyd (D)
▌4. Joe L. Evins (D)
▌5. Richard Fulton (D), until August 14, 1975

▌Clifford Allen (D), from November 25, 1975

▌6. Robin Beard (R)
▌7. Ed Jones (D)
▌8. Harold Ford Sr. (D)

==== Texas ====
▌1. Wright Patman (D), until March 7, 1976

▌Sam B. Hall Jr. (D), from June 19, 1976

▌2. Charlie Wilson (D)
▌3. James M. Collins (R)
▌4. Ray Roberts (D)
▌5. Alan Steelman (R)
▌6. Olin E. Teague (D)
▌7. Bill Archer (R)
▌8. Robert C. Eckhardt (D)
▌9. Jack Brooks (D)
▌10. J. J. Pickle (D)
▌11. William R. Poage (D)
▌12. Jim Wright (D)
▌13. Jack Hightower (D)
▌14. John Andrew Young (D)
▌15. Kika de la Garza (D)
▌16. Richard Crawford White (D)
▌17. Omar Burleson (D)
▌18. Barbara Jordan (D)
▌19. George H. Mahon (D)
▌20. Henry B. González (D)
▌21. Bob Krueger (D)
▌22. Robert R. Casey (D), until January 22, 1976

▌Ron Paul (R), from April 3, 1976

▌23. Abraham Kazen (D)
▌24. Dale Milford (D)

==== Utah ====
▌1. K. Gunn McKay (D)
▌2. Allan Turner Howe (D)

==== Vermont ====
▌At-large. Jim Jeffords (R)

==== Virginia ====
▌1. Thomas N. Downing (D)
▌2. G. William Whitehurst (R)
▌3. David E. Satterfield III (D)
▌4. Robert Daniel (R)
▌5. Dan Daniel (D)
▌6. M. Caldwell Butler (R)
▌7. J. Kenneth Robinson (R)
▌8. Herbert Harris (D)
▌9. William C. Wampler (R)
▌10. Joseph L. Fisher (D)

==== Washington ====
▌1. Joel Pritchard (R)
▌2. Lloyd Meeds (D)
▌3. Don Bonker (D)
▌4. Mike McCormack (D)
▌5. Tom Foley (D)
▌6. Floyd Hicks (D)
▌7. Brock Adams (D)

==== West Virginia ====
▌1. Bob Mollohan (D)
▌2. Harley Orrin Staggers (D)
▌3. John M. Slack Jr. (D)
▌4. Ken Hechler (D)

==== Wisconsin ====
▌1. Les Aspin (D)
▌2. Robert Kastenmeier (D)
▌3. Alvin Baldus (D)
▌4. Clement J. Zablocki (D)
▌5. Henry S. Reuss (D)
▌6. William A. Steiger (R)
▌7. Dave Obey (D)
▌8. Robert John Cornell (D)
▌9. Bob Kasten (R)

==== Wyoming ====
▌At-large. Teno Roncalio (D)

==== Non-voting members ====
▌District of Columbia. Walter Fauntroy (D)
▌Guam. Antonio Borja Won Pat (D)
▌Virgin Islands. Ron de Lugo (D)
▌Puerto Rico. Jaime Benítez Rexach (PPD)

House majority leadership

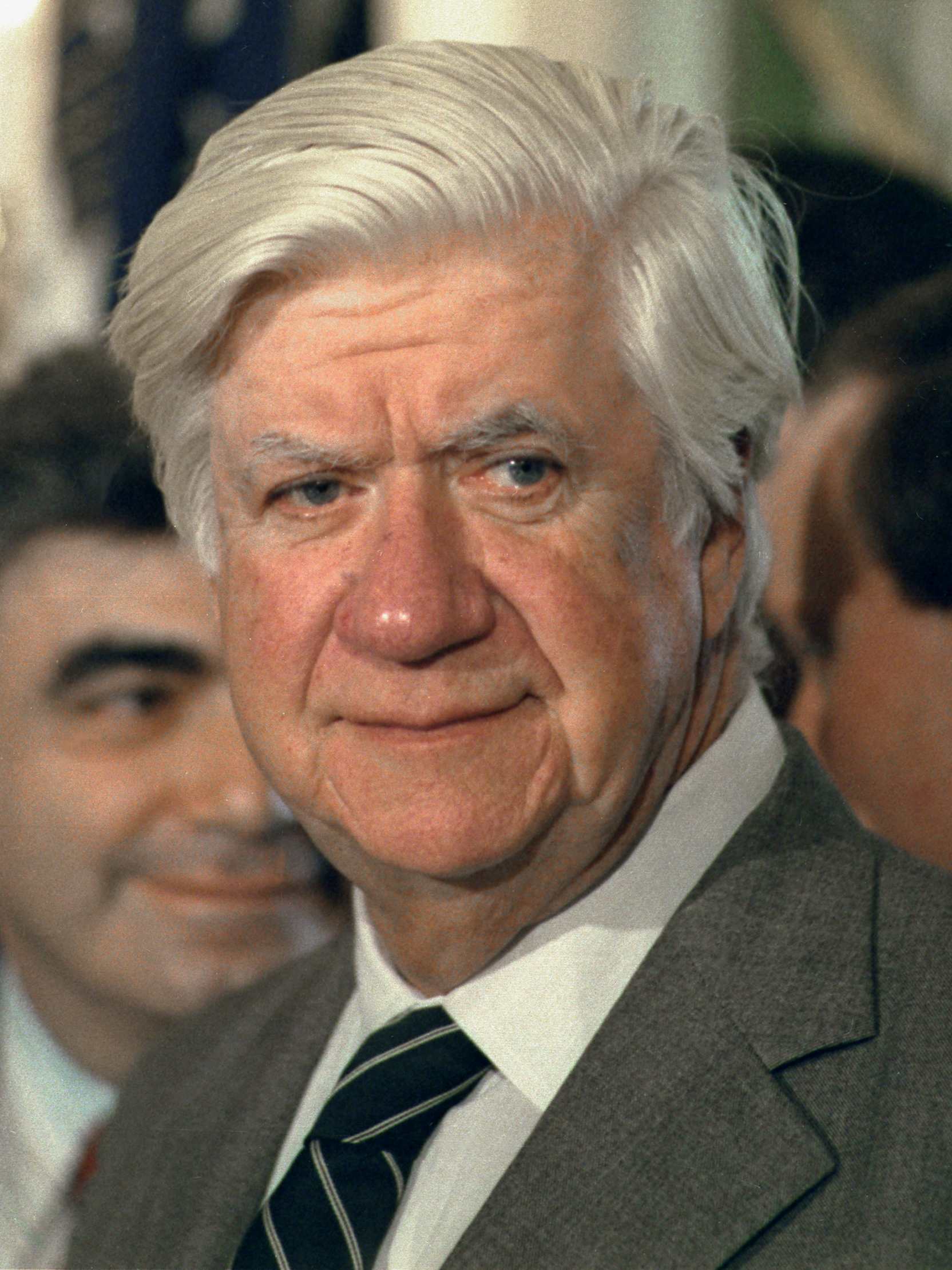
Democratic leader
Tip O'Neill

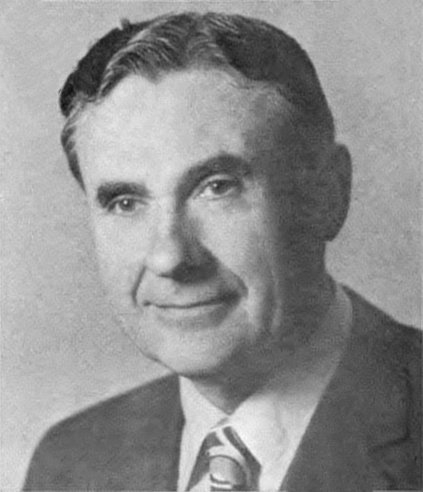
Democratic whip
John J. McFall

House minority leadership

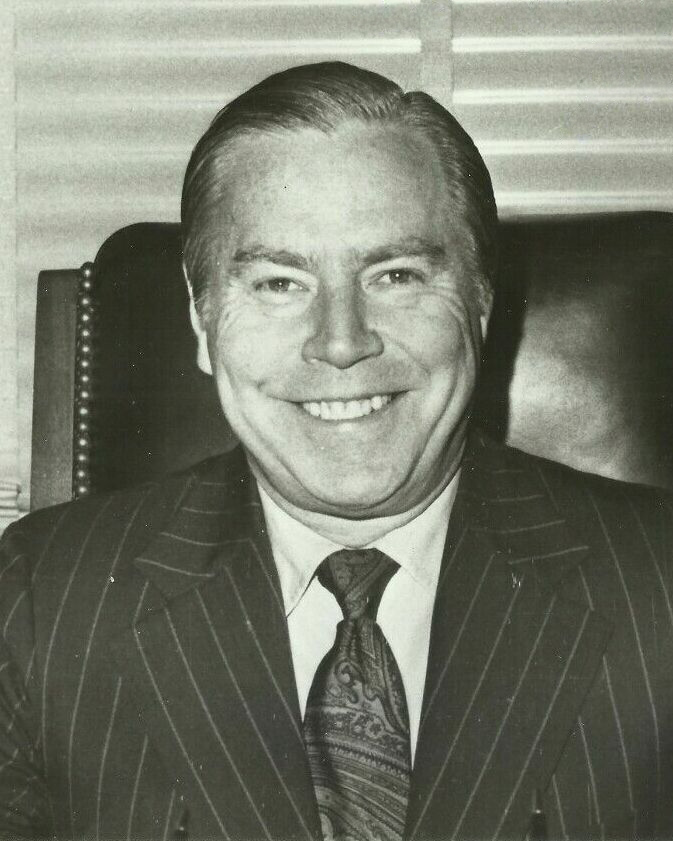
Republican leader
John Jacob Rhodes

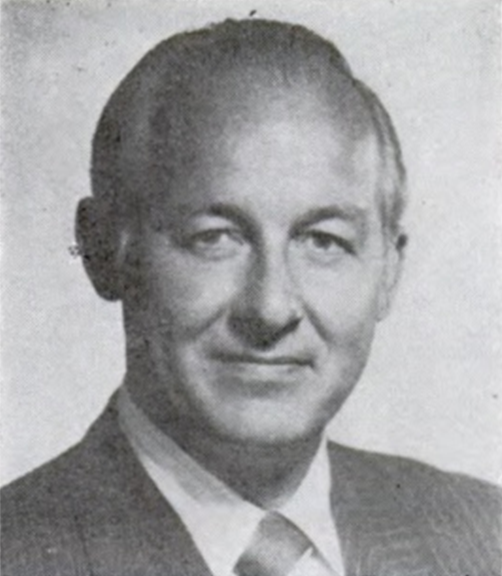
Republican whip
Bob Michel

== Changes in membership ==
The count below reflects changes from the beginning of the first session of this Congress.

=== Senate ===
- Replacements: 9
  - Democratic: no net change
  - Republican: 1 seat net gain
- Deaths: 1
- Resignations: 6
- Vacancy: 0

Total seats with changes: 8

Senate changes
| State (class) | Vacated by | Reason for change | Successor | Date of successor's formal installation (Note: When seated or oath administered, not necessarily when service began.) |
|---|---|---|---|---|
| New Hampshire (3) | Vacant | Disputed election. Interim senator appointed August 8, 1975. | Norris Cotton (R) | August 8, 1975 |
| New Hampshire (3) | Norris Cotton (R) | Interim appointee resigned. Successor elected September 16, 1975. | John A. Durkin (D) | September 18, 1975 |
| Michigan (1) | Philip Hart (D) | Died December 26, 1976, having already planned to retire before the end of the term. Successor appointed December 30, 1976, to finish the term, having already been elected to the next term. | Donald Riegle (D) | December 30, 1976 |
| Missouri (1) | Stuart Symington (D) | Resigned December 27, 1976, to give successor preferential seniority. Successor appointed December 27, 1976, to finish the term, having already been elected to the next term. | John Danforth (R) | December 27, 1976 |
| Nebraska (1) | Roman Hruska (R) | Resigned December 27, 1976, to give successor preferential seniority. Successor appointed December 28, 1976, to finish the term, having already been elected to the next term. | Edward Zorinsky (D) | December 28, 1976 |
| Ohio (1) | Robert Taft Jr. (R) | Resigned December 28, 1976, to give successor preferential seniority. Successor appointed December 28, 1976, to finish the term, having already been elected to the next term. | Howard Metzenbaum (D) | December 29, 1976 |
| Rhode Island (1) | John Pastore (D) | Resigned December 28, 1976, to give successor preferential seniority. Successor appointed December 29, 1976, to finish the term, having already been elected to the next term. | John Chafee (R) | December 29, 1976 |
| Minnesota (2) | Walter Mondale (DFL) | Resigned December 30, 1976, after being elected Vice-President of the United States. Interim Senator appointed December 30, 1976. | Wendell R. Anderson (DFL) | December 30, 1976 |
| California (1) | John V. Tunney (D) | Resigned January 1, 1977, to give successor preferential seniority. Successor appointed January 2, 1977, to finish the term, having already been elected to the next term. | S. I. Hayakawa (R) | January 2, 1977 |

=== House of Representatives ===
- Replacements: 3
  - Democratic: 3 seat net loss
  - Republican: 2 seat net gain
- Deaths: 2
- Resignations: 2
- Contested election: 0
- Total seats with changes: 4

House changes
| District | Vacated by | Reason for change | Successor | Date of successor's formal installation |
|---|---|---|---|---|
| Oklahoma 5th | John Jarman (D) | Changed parties. | John Jarman (R) | January 23, 1975 |
| Illinois 5th | John C. Kluczynski (D) | Died January 26, 1975. | John G. Fary (D) | July 8, 1975 |
| California 37th | Jerry Pettis (R) | Died February 14, 1975. | Shirley Neil Pettis (R) | April 29, 1975 |
| Tennessee 5th | Richard Fulton (D) | Resigned August 14, 1975, after being elected Mayor of Nashville. | Clifford Allen (D) | November 25, 1975 |
| New York 39th | James F. Hastings (R) | Resigned January 20, 1976. | Stan Lundine (D) | March 2, 1976 |
| Texas 22nd | Robert R. Casey (D) | Resigned January 22, 1976, after being appointed a commissioner on the Federal Maritime Commission. | Ron Paul (R) | April 3, 1976 |
| Texas 1st | Wright Patman (D) | Died March 7, 1976. | Sam B. Hall Jr. (D) | June 19, 1976 |
| Pennsylvania 1st | William A. Barrett (D) | Died April 12, 1976. | Michael Myers (D) | November 2, 1976 |
| Massachusetts 7th | Torbert Macdonald (D) | Died May 21, 1976. | Ed Markey (D) | November 2, 1976 |
| Missouri 6th | Jerry Litton (D) | Died August 3, 1976. | Tom Coleman (R) | November 2, 1976 |
| Ohio 18th | Wayne Hays (D) | Resigned September 1, 1976, due to the Elizabeth Ray sex scandal. | Vacant | Not filled this term |
| Michigan 7th | Donald Riegle (D) | Resigned December 30, 1976, after being appointed to the United States Senate. | Vacant | Not filled this term |

== Committees ==
Lists of committees and their party leaders for members of the House and Senate committees can be found through the Official Congressional Directory at the bottom of this article. The directory after the pages of terms of service lists committees of the Senate, House (Standing with Subcommittees, Select and Special) and Joint and, after that, House/Senate committee assignments. On the committees section of the House and Senate in the Official Congressional Directory, the committee's members on the first row on the left side shows the chairman of the committee and on the right side shows the ranking member of the committee.

=== Special or select ===
- Church Committee (Senate Select Committee to Study Governmental Operations with Respect to Intelligence Activities): July 27, 1975 – May 19, 1976; replaced by Senate Select Committee on Intelligence
- Joint Committee on Arrangements for the Bicentennial: September 5, 1975 – October 1, 1976

=== Senate ===
- Aging (Special) (Chair: Frank Church)
- Aeronautical and Space Sciences (Chair: Frank Moss; Ranking Member: Barry Goldwater)
- Agriculture and Forestry (Chair: Herman Talmadge; Ranking Member: Bob Dole)
  - Environment, Soil Conservation and Forestry (Chair: James Eastland; Ranking Member: Jesse Helms)
  - Agricultural Credit and Rural Electrification (Chair: George McGovern; Ranking Member: Carl T. Curtis)
  - Agricultural Production, Marketing and Stabilization of Prices (Chair: Walter "Dee" Huddleston; Ranking Member: Milton R. Young)
  - Rural Development (Chair: James Allen; Ranking Member: Carl T. Curtis)
  - Foreign Agricultural Policy (Chair: Hubert Humphrey; Ranking Member: Henry Bellmon)
- Appropriations (Chair: John L. McClellan; Ranking Member: Milton Young)
  - Agriculture and Related Agencies (Chair: Gale W. McGee; Ranking Member: Hiram L. Fong)
  - Defense (Chair: John L. McClellan; Ranking Member: Milton R. Young)
  - District of Columbia (Chair: Lawton Chiles; Ranking Member: Charles Mathias)
  - Foreign Operations (Chair: Daniel Inouye; Ranking Member: Edward W. Brooke)
  - HUD-Independent Agencies (Chair: William Proxmire; Ranking Member: Charles Mathias)
  - Interior (Chair: William Proxmire; Ranking Member: Ted Stevens)
  - Labor, Health, Education and Welfare (Chair: Warren Magnuson; Ranking Member: Edward Brooke)
  - Legislative (Chair: Fritz Hollings; Ranking Member: Richard S. Schweiker)
  - Military Construction (Chair: Mike Mansfield; Ranking Member: Ted Stevens)
  - Public Works (Chair: John C. Stennis; Ranking Member: Mark Hatfield)
  - State, Justice, Commerce and the Judiciary (Chair: John Pastore; Ranking Member: Roman L. Hruska)
  - Transportation (Chair: Birch Bayh; Ranking Member: Clifford P. Case)
  - Treasury, Postal Service and General Government (Chair: Joseph Montoya; Ranking Member: Henry Bellmon)
- Armed Services (Chair: John C. Stennis; Ranking Member: Strom Thurmond)
  - Intelligence (Chair: John C. Stennis; Ranking Member: Barry Goldwater)
  - Preparedness Investigating (Chair: John C. Stennis; Ranking Member: Strom Thurmond)
  - National Stockfile and Naval Petroleum Reserves (Chair: Howard Cannon; Ranking Member: William L. Scott)
  - Military Construction Authorization (Chair: Stuart Symington; Ranking Member: John Tower)
  - Arms Control (Chair: Henry M. Jackson; Ranking Member: Barry Goldwater)
  - Tactical Air Power (Chair: Howard Cannon; Ranking Member: Barry Goldwater)
  - Research and Development (Chair: Thomas J. McIntyre; Ranking Member: Robert Taft Jr.)
  - General Legislation (Chair: Harry F. Byrd Jr.; Ranking Member: Dewey F. Bartlett)
  - Manpower and Personnel (Chair: Sam Nunn; Ranking Member: William L. Scott)
- Banking, Housing and Urban Affairs (Chair: William Proxmire; Ranking Member: John G. Tower)
  - Oversight (Chair: William Proxmire; Ranking Member: John G. Tower)
  - Housing and Urban Affairs (Chair: John Sparkman; Ranking Member: Edward W. Brooke)
  - Financial Institutions (Chair: Thomas J. McIntyre; Ranking Member: John G. Tower)
  - Securities (Chair: Harrison A. Williams; Ranking Member: Edward W. Brooke)
  - International Finance (Chair: Adlai Stevenson III; Ranking Member: Bob Packwood)
  - Production and Stabilization (Chair: Joe Biden; Ranking Member: Jesse Helms)
  - Consumer Affairs (Chair: Joe Biden; Ranking Member: Jake Garn)
  - Small Business (Chair: Robert Burren Morgan; Ranking Member: Jake Garn)
- Budget (Chair: Edmund Muskie; Ranking Member: Henry Bellmon)
- Commerce (Chair: Warren Magnuson; Ranking Member: James B. Pearson)
  - Aviation (Chair: Howard Cannon; Ranking Member: James B. Pearson)
  - Communications (Chair: John Pastore; Ranking Member: Robert P. Griffin)
  - Consumer (Chair: Frank Moss; Ranking Member: James L. Buckley)
  - Environment (Chair: Philip Hart; Ranking Member: Lowell P. Weicker)
  - Foreign Commerce and Tourism (Chair: Daniel Inouye; Ranking Member: James L. Buckley)
  - Merchant Marine (Chair: Russell B. Long; Ranking Member: J. Glenn Beall Jr.)
  - Oceans and Atmosphere (Chair: Fritz Hollings; Ranking Member: Ted Stevens)
  - Surface Transportation (Chair: Vance Hartke; Ranking Member: Lowell P. Weicker)
  - Science, Technology and Commerce (Chair: John V. Tunney; Ranking Member: J. Glenn Beall Jr.)
  - Oil and Natural Gas Production and Distribution (Chair: Adlai Stevenson III; Ranking Member: Ted Stevens)
  - To Study Textile Industry (Chair: John Pastore; Ranking Member: Lowell P. Weicker)
  - the Great Lakes-St. Lawrence Seaway (Chair: Philip Hart; Ranking Member: Robert P. Griffin)
  - Freight Car Shortage (Chair: Vance Hartke; Ranking Member: James B. Pearson)
- District of Columbia (Chair: Thomas Eagleton; Ranking Member: Charles Mathias)
- Finance (Chair: Russell B. Long; Ranking Member: Carl T. Curtis)
  - Health (Chair: Herman Talmadge; Ranking Member: Bob Dole)
  - Foundations (Chair: Vance Hartke; Ranking Member: Clifford P. Hansen)
  - International Trade (Chair: Abraham Ribicoff; Ranking Member: Paul J. Fannin)
  - International Finance and Resources (Chair: Harry F. Byrd Jr.; Ranking Member: William V. Roth Jr.)
  - Private Pension Plans (Chair: Gaylord Nelson; Ranking Member: William V. Roth Jr.)
  - Social Security Financing (Chair: Walter Mondale; Ranking Member: Clifford P. Hansen)
  - Energy (Chair: Mike Gravel; Ranking Member: Clifford P. Hansen)
  - Financial Markets (Chair: Lloyd Bentsen; Ranking Member: Bill Brock)
  - Revenue Markets (Chair: William Hathaway; Ranking Member: Bob Packwood)
  - Administration of the Internal Revenue Code (Chair: Floyd Haskell; Ranking Member: Bob Dole)
  - Supplemental Security Income (Chair: Russell B. Long; Ranking Member: Paul Fannin)
- Foreign Relations (Chair: John Sparkman; Ranking Member: Clifford P. Case)
  - European Affairs (Chair: John Sparkman; Ranking Member: Clifford P. Case)
  - Far Eastern Affairs (Chair: Mike Mansfield; Ranking Member: Hugh Scott)
  - Multinational Corporations (Chair: Frank Church; Ranking Member: Clifford P. Case)
  - Arms Control and Security Agreements (Chair: Stuart Symington; Ranking Member: Jacob K. Javits)
  - Oceans and International Environment (Chair: Claiborne Pell; Ranking Member: Robert P. Griffin)
  - Western Hemisphere Affairs (Chair: Gale W. McGee; Ranking Member: Howard H. Baker Jr.)
  - Near Eastern and South Asian Affairs (Chair: George McGovern; Ranking Member: Charles H. Percy)
  - Foreign Assistance and Economic Policy (Chair: Hubert Humphrey; Ranking Member: Clifford P. Case)
  - African Affairs (Chair: Dick Clark; Ranking Member: James B. Pearson)
- Government Operations (Chair: Abraham Ribicoff; Ranking Member: Charles H. Percy)
  - Investigations (Chair: Henry M. Jackson; Ranking Member: Charles H. Percy)
  - Intergovernmental Relations (Chair: Edmund Muskie; Ranking Member: William V. Roth Jr.)
  - Reports, Accounting and Management (Chair: Lee Metcalf; Ranking Member: Bill Brock)
  - Overnight Procedures (Chair: Sam Nunn; Ranking Member: Jacob K. Javits)
  - Federal Spending Practices, Efficiency and Open Government (Chair: Lawton Chiles; Ranking Member: Lowell P. Weicker)
- Interior and Insular Affairs (Chair: Henry M. Jackson; Ranking Member: Paul J. Fannin)
  - Energy Research and Water Resources (Chair: Frank Church; Ranking Member: Mark O. Hatfield)
  - Environment and Land Resources (Chair: Floyd Haskell; Ranking Member: James A. McClure)
  - Indian Affairs (Chair: James Abourezk; Ranking Member: Dewey F. Bartlett)
  - Minerals, Materials and Fuels (Chair: Lee Metcalf; Ranking Member: Paul Fannin)
  - Parks and Recreation (Chair: J. Bennett Johnston; Ranking Member: Clifford P. Hansen)
  - Legislative Oversight (Chair: Henry M. Jackson; Ranking Member: Paul Fannin)
  - Integrated Oil Operations (Special) (Chair: Floyd Haskell)
- Judiciary (Chair: James Eastland; Ranking Member: Roman L. Hruska)
  - Administrative Practice and Procedure (Chair: Ted Kennedy; Ranking Member: Strom Thurmond)
  - Antitrust and Monopoly (Chair: Philip Hart; Ranking Member: Roman L. Hruska)
  - Constitutional Amendments (Chair: Birch Bayh; Ranking Member: Hiram L. Fong)
  - Constitutional Rights (Chair: John V. Tunney; Ranking Member: Roman L. Hruska)
  - Criminal Laws and Procedures (Chair: John L. McClellan; Ranking Member: Roman L. Hruska)
  - FBI Oversight (Chair: James Eastland; Ranking Member: Roman Hruska)
  - Federal Charters, Holidays and Celebrations (Chair: Roman Hruska; Ranking Member: John L. McClellan)
  - Immigration and Naturalization (Chair: James Eastland; Ranking Member: Hiram L. Fong)
  - Improvements in Judicial Machinery (Chair: Quentin Burdick; Ranking Member: Roman L. Hruska)
  - Internal Security (Chair: James Eastland; Ranking Member: Hugh Scott)
  - Juvenile Delinquency (Chair: Birch Bayh; Ranking Member: Roman L. Hruska)
  - Patents, Trademarks and Copyrights (Chair: John L. McClellan; Ranking Member: Hugh Scott)
  - Penitentiaries (Chair: Quentin Burdick; Ranking Member: Charles Mathias)
  - Rufugees and Escapees (Chair: Ted Kennedy; Ranking Member: Hiram L. Fong)
  - Revision of Codification (Chair: Robert Byrd; Ranking Member: Hugh Scott)
  - Separation of Powers (Chair: James Abourezk; Ranking Member: Charles Mathias)
- Labor and Public Welfare (Chair: Harrison A. Williams; Ranking Member: Jacob K. Javits)
  - Labor (Chair: Harrison A. Williams; Ranking Member: Jacob K. Javits)
  - The Handicapped (Chair: Jennings Randolph; Ranking Member: Robert T. Stafford)
  - Education (Chair: Claiborne Pell; Ranking Member: J. Glenn Beall Jr.)
  - Health (Chair: Ted Kennedy; Ranking Member: Richard S. Schweiker)
  - Employment, Poverty and Migratory Lands (Chair: Gaylord Nelson; Ranking Member: Robert Taft Jr.)
  - Children and Youth (Chair: Walter Mondale; Ranking Member: Robert T. Stafford)
  - Aging (Chair: Thomas Eagleton; Ranking Member: J. Glenn Beall Jr.)
  - Alcoholism and Narcotics (Chair: William Hathaway; Ranking Member: Richard S. Schweiker)
  - Arts and Humanities (Chair: Claiborne Pell; Ranking Member: Jacob K. Javits)
  - National Science Foundation (Chair: Ted Kennedy; Ranking Member: Paul Laxalt)
  - Human Resources (Chair: Alan Cranston; Ranking Member: J. Glenn Beall Jr.)
- Nutrition and Human Needs (Select) (Chair: George McGovern)
- Post Office and Civil Service (Chair: Gale W. McGee; Ranking Member: Hiram L. Fong)
  - Ex-Officio Members of Postal Appropriations (Chair: Gale W. McGee)
  - Civil Service Policies and Practices (Chair: Jennings Randolph; Ranking Member: Hiram L. Fong)
  - Compensation and Employment Benefits (Chair: Quentin Burdick; Ranking Member: Henry Bellmon)
  - Postal Operations (Chair: Ernest F. Hollings; Ranking Member: Bob Dole)
- National Emergencies and Delegated Emergency Powers (Special) (Chair: [data missing]; Ranking Member: [data missing])
- Public Works (Chair: Jennings Randolph; Ranking Member: Howard H. Baker Jr.)
  - Environmental Pollution (Chair: Edmund Muskie; Ranking Member: James L. Buckley)
  - Panel on Environmental Science and Technology (Chair: John Culver; Ranking Member: James L. Buckley)
  - Economic Development (Chair: Joseph Montoya; Ranking Member: James A. McClure)
  - Water Resources (Chair: Mike Gravel; Ranking Member: Pete Domenici)
  - Transportation (Chair: Lloyd Bentsen; Ranking Member: Robert T. Stafford)
  - Disaster Relief (Chair: Quentin Burdick; Ranking Member: Pete Domenici)
  - Buildings and Grounds (Chair: Robert Burren Morgan; Ranking Member: James L. Buckley)
- Rules and Administration (Chair: Howard Cannon; Ranking Member: Mark O. Hatfield)
  - Standing Rules of the Senate (Chair: Robert Byrd; Ranking Member: Robert P. Griffin)
  - Privileges and Elections (Chair: Claiborne Pell; Ranking Member: Robert P. Griffin)
  - Printing (Chair: Howard Cannon; Ranking Member: Hugh Scott)
  - Library (Chair: Howard Cannon; Ranking Member: Mark O. Hatfield)
  - Smithsonian Institution (Chair: Claiborne Pell; Ranking Member: Hugh Scott)
  - Restaurant (Chair: James Allen; Ranking Member: Mark O. Hatfield)
  - Computer Services (Chair: Howard Cannon; Ranking Member: Mark O. Hatfield)
- Intelligence Activities (Select) (Chair: Daniel Inouye)
- Senate Committee System (Special) (Chair: [data missing]; Ranking Member: [data missing])
- Small Business (Select) (Chair: Gaylord Nelson)
- Standards and Conduct (Select) (Chair: Howard Cannon; Ranking Member: Vacant)
- To Study Governmental Operations With Respect to Intelligence Activities (Select) (Chair: [data missing]; Ranking Member: [data missing])
- Termination of the National Emergency (Special) (Chair: [data missing]; Ranking Member: [data missing])
- Veterans' Affairs (Chair: Vance Hartke; Ranking Member: Clifford P. Hansen)
  - Compensation and Pensions (Chair: Herman Talmadge; Ranking Member: Clifford P. Hansen)
  - Health and Hospitals (Chair: Alan Cranston; Ranking Member: Strom Thurmond)
  - Housing and Insurance (Chair: Richard Stone; Ranking Member: William L. Scott)
  - Readjustment, Education and Employment (Chair: Vance Hartke; Ranking Member: Robert T. Stafford)
- Whole

=== House of Representatives ===
- Aging (Select) (Chair: William J. Randall)
- Agriculture (Chair: Tom Foley; Ranking Member: William C. Wampler)
  - Livestock and Grains (Chair: William R. Poage; Ranking Member: Keith G. Sebelius)
  - Tobacco (Chair: Walter B. Jones Sr.; Ranking Member: William C. Wampler)
  - Cotton (Chair: David R. Bowen; Ranking Member: W. Henson Moore)
  - Dairy and Poultry (Chair: Ed Jones; Ranking Member: Jim Jeffords)
  - Family Farms and Rural Development (Chair: Charlie Rose; Ranking Member: Peter A. Peyser)
- Appropriations (Chair: George H. Mahon; Ranking Member: Elford Cederberg)
  - Agriculture and Related Agencies (Chair: Jamie Whitten; Ranking Member: Mark Andrews)
  - Defense (Chair: George H. Mahon; Ranking Member: Jack Edwards)
  - District of Columbia (Chair: William Natcher; Ranking Member: Bill Young)
  - Foreign Operations (Chair: Otto Passman; Ranking Member: Garner E. Shriver)
  - HUD-Independent Agencies (Chair: Edward Boland; Ranking Member: Burt Talcott)
  - Interior (Chair: Sidney R. Yates; Ranking Member: Joseph M. McDade)
  - Labor-Health, Education and Welfare (Chair: Dan Flood; Ranking Member: Robert H. Michel)
  - Legislative (Chair: Robert R. Casey; Ranking Member: Lawrence Coughlin)
  - Military Construction (Chair: Bob Sikes; Ranking Member: Robert C. McEwen)
  - Public Works (Chair: Joe L. Evins; Ranking Member: John T. Myers)
  - State, Justice, Commerce and Judiciary (Chair: John M. Slack Jr.; Ranking Member: Elford Cederberg)
  - Transportation (Chair: John J. McFall; Ranking Member: Silvio O. Conte)
  - Treasury, Postal Service and General Government (Chair: Tom Steed; Ranking Member: Clarence E. Miller)
- Armed Services (Chair: Melvin Price; Ranking Member: Floyd Spence)
  - Research and Development (Chair: Melvin Price; Ranking Member: William L. Dickinson)
  - Seapower, Strategic and Critical Materials (Chair: Charles E. Bennett; Ranking Member: Floyd Spence)
  - Military Compensation (Chair: Samuel S. Stratton; Ranking Member: George M. O'Brien)
  - Military Installations and Facilities (Chair: Richard Howard Ichord Jr.; Ranking Member: G. William Whitehurst)
  - Military Personnel (Chair: Lucien Nedzi; Ranking Member: Bob Wilson)
  - Investigations (Chair: F. Edward Hébert; Ranking Member: Albert W. Johnson)
  - Intelligence (Chair: Lucien Nedzi; Ranking Member: Bob Wilson)
- Banking and Currency (Chair: Henry S. Reuss; Ranking Member: Albert W. Johnson)
  - Domestic Monetary Policy (Chair: Wright Patman; Ranking Member: John B. Conlan)
  - Housing and Community and Development (Chair: William A. Barrett; Ranking Member: Garry E. Brown)
  - Economic Stabilization (Chair: Thomas L. Ashley; Ranking Member: Stewart B. McKinney)
  - Consumer Affairs (Chair: Frank Annunzio; Ranking Member: Chalmers P. Wylie)
  - International Development Institutions and Finance (Chair: Henry B. González; Ranking Member: Albert W. Johnson)
  - Financial Institutions Supervision, Regulation and Insurance (Chair: Fernand St Germain; Ranking Member: John H. Rousselot)
  - International Trade, Investment and Monetary Policy (Chair: Thomas M. Rees; Ranking Member: J. William Stanton)
  - General Oversight and Renegotiation (Chair: Joseph Minish; Ranking Member: Richard T. Schulze)
  - Historic Preservation and Coinage (Chair: Robert Grier Stephens Jr.; Ranking Member: George V. Hansen)
- Budget (Chair: Brock Adams; Ranking Member: Del Latta)
- Crime (Select) (Chair: [data missing]; Ranking Member: [data missing])
- District of Columbia (Chair: Charles Diggs; Ranking Member: Gilbert Gude)
  - Commerce, Housing and Transportation (Chair: W. S. Stuckey Jr.; Ranking Member: Gilbert Gude)
  - Education, Labor and Social Services (Chair: Ron Dellums; Ranking Member: Edward G. Biester)
  - Government Operations (Chair: Walter E. Fauntroy; Ranking Member: Charles W. Whalen Jr.)
  - Judiciary (Chair: James Mann; Ranking Member: Tom Railsback)
  - Fiscal Affairs (Chair: Romano Mazzoli; Ranking Member: Stewart McKinney)
  - The Bicentennial, The Environment and the International Community (Chair: Herbert Harris; Ranking Member: Robert W. Daniel Jr.)
- Education and Labor (Chair: Carl D. Perkins; Ranking Member: Al Quie)
  - Elementary, Secondary and Vocational Education (Chair: Carl D. Perkins; Ranking Member: Al Quie)
  - Labor-Management Relations (Chair: Frank Thompson; Ranking Member: John N. Erlenborn)
  - Labor Standards (Chair: John Herman Dent; Ranking Member: John N. Erlenborn)
  - Manpower, Compensation, Health and Safety (Chair: Dominick V. Daniels; Ranking Member: Marvin L. Esch)
  - Select Education (Chair: John Brademas; Ranking Member: Alphonso Bell)
  - Postsecondary Education (Chair: James G. O'Hara; Ranking Member: Edwin D. Eshleman)
  - Equal Opportunities (Chair: Augustus Hawkins; Ranking Member: John Buchanan)
  - Agricultural Labor (Chair: William D. Ford; Ranking Member: Ronald A. Sarasin)
- Government Operations (Chair: Jack Brooks; Ranking Member: Frank Horton)
  - Legislation and National Security (Chair: Jack Brooks; Ranking Member: Frank Horton)
  - Intergovernmental Relations and Human Resources (Chair: Lawrence H. Fountain; Ranking Member: John W. Wydler)
  - Conservation, Energy and Natural Resources (Chair: William S. Moorhead; Ranking Member: Gilbert Gude)
  - Government Activities and Transportation (Chair: William J. Randall; Ranking Member: Charles Thone)
  - Commerce, Consumer and Monetary Affairs (Chair: Benjamin Stanley Rosenthal; Ranking Member: Garry E. Brown)
  - Manpower and Housing (Chair: Floyd Hicks; Ranking Member: Alan Steelman)
  - Government Information and Individual Rights (Chair: Bella Abzug; Ranking Member: Sam Steiger)
- House Administration (Chair: Wayne Hays, then Frank Thompson; Ranking Member: William L. Dickinson)
  - Accounts (Chair: Frank Thompson; Ranking Member: Sam Steiger)
  - Elections (Chair: John H. Dent; Ranking Member: M. Caldwell Butler)
  - Library and Memorials (Chair: Lucien Nedzi; Ranking Member: James C. Cleveland)
  - Printing (Chair: John Brademas; Ranking Member: J. Herbert Burke)
  - Electrical and Mechanical Office Equipment (Chair: Augustus Hawkins; Ranking Member: J. Herbert Burke)
  - Personnel and Police (Chair: Frank Annunzio; Ranking Member: Samuel L. Devine)
  - Contracts (Chair: Joseph M. Gaydos; Ranking Member: James C. Cleveland)
  - Parking (Chair: Ed Jones; Ranking Member: William L. Dickinson)
  - Paper Conservation (Chair: Bob Mollohan; Ranking Member: James C. Cleveland)
  - Computer (Ad Hoc) (Chair: Charlie Rose; Ranking Member: Marjorie Holt)
  - Restaurant (Ad Hoc) (Chair: Dawson Mathis; Ranking Member: J. Herbert Burke)
- House Beauty Shop (Select) (Chair: Margaret Heckler; Ranking Member: )
- Intelligence (Select) (Chair: Lucien Nedzi, then Otis G. Pike; Ranking Member: )
- Insular Affairs (Chair: James A. Haley; Ranking Member: Joe Skubitz)
  - National Parks and Recreation (Chair: Roy A. Taylor; Ranking Member: Keith G. Sebelius)
  - Water and Power Resources (Chair: Harold T. Johnson; Ranking Member: Manuel Lujan Jr.)
  - Energy and the Environment (Chair: Mo Udall; Ranking Member: Alan Steelman)
  - Territorial and Insular Affairs (Chair: Phillip Burton; Ranking Member: William M. Ketchum)
  - Mines and Mining (Chair: Patsy Mink; Ranking Member: Philip Ruppe)
  - Indian Affairs (Chair: Lloyd Meeds; Ranking Member: Don Young)
  - Public Lands (Chair: John Melcher; Ranking Member: Sam Steiger)
- International Relations (Chair: Thomas E. Morgan; Ranking Member: William S. Broomfield)
- Interstate and Foreign Commerce (Chair: Harley Orrin Staggers; Ranking Member: Samuel L. Devine)
  - Communications (Chair: Torbert Macdonald; Ranking Member: Louis Frey Jr.)
  - Oversight and Investigations (Chair: John E. Moss; Ranking Member: James M. Collins)
  - Energy and Power (Chair: John Dingell; Ranking Member: Clarence J. Brown)
  - Health and the Environment (Chair: Paul Rogers; Ranking Member: Tim Lee Carter)
  - Consumer Protection and Finance (Chair: Lionel Van Deerlin; Ranking Member: John Y. McCollister)
  - Transportation and Commerce (Chair: Fred B. Rooney; Ranking Member: Joe Skubitz)
- Judiciary (Chair: Peter W. Rodino; Ranking Member: Edward Hutchinson)
  - Immigration, Citizenship and International Law (Chair: Joshua Eilberg; Ranking Member: Hamilton Fish IV)
  - Courts, Civil Liberties and the Administration of Justice (Chair: Robert Kastenmeier; Ranking Member: Thomas F. Railsback)
  - Monopolies and Commercial Law (Chair: Peter W. Rodino; Ranking Member: Edward Hutchinson)
  - Administrative Law and Governmental Relations (Chair: Walter Flowers; Ranking Member: Carlos J. Moorhead)
  - Civil and Constitutional Rights (Chair: Don Edwards; Ranking Member: M. Caldwell Butler)
  - Crime (Chair: John Conyers; Ranking Member: Robert McClory)
  - Criminal Justice (Chair: William L. Hungate; Ranking Member: Charles E. Wiggins)
- Merchant Marine and Fisheries (Chair: Leonor Sullivan; Ranking Member: Philip E. Ruppe)
  - Merchant Marine (Chair: Thomas N. Downing; Ranking Member: Paul N. McCloskey Jr.)
  - Fisheries, Wildlife Conservation and the Environment (Chair: Robert L. Leggett; Ranking Member: Edwin B. Forsythe)
  - Coast Guard and Navigation (Chair: Mario Biaggi; Ranking Member: Pierre du Pont IV)
  - Oceanography (Chair: John M. Murphy; Ranking Member: Charles A. Mosher)
  - Panama Canal (Chair: Ralph Metcalfe; Ranking Member: Gene Snyder)
- Missing Persons in Southeast Asia (Select) (Chair: Gillespie V. Montgomery; Ranking Member: )
- Modernization of House Gallery Facilities (Special) (Chair: Joe D. Waggoner Jr.; Ranking Member: )
- Outer Continental Shelf (Ad Hoc/Select) (Chair: [data missing]; Ranking Member: [data missing])
- Post Office and Civil Service (Chair: David N. Henderson; Ranking Member: Edward J. Derwinski)
  - Manpower and Civil Service (Chair: James M. Hanley; Ranking Member: Edward J. Derwinski)
  - Postal Service (Chair: James M. Hanley; Ranking Member: Albert W. Johnson)
  - Postal Facilities, Mail and Labor Management (Chair: Charles H. Wilson; Ranking Member: Andrew J. Hinshaw)
  - Retirement and Employee Benefits (Chair: Richard Crawford White; Ranking Member: Gene Taylor)
  - Employee Political Rights and Intergovernmental Programs (Chair: Bill Clay; Ranking Member: James M. Collins)
  - Census and Population (Chair: Patricia Schroeder; Ranking Member: James M. Collins)
- Professional Sports (Select) (Chair: [data missing]; Ranking Member: [data missing])
- Public Works and Transportation (Chair: Robert E. Jones Jr.; Ranking Member: Bill Harsha)
  - Aviation (Chair: Glenn M. Anderson; Ranking Member: Gene Snyder)
  - Economic Development (Chair: Robert A. Roe; Ranking Member: John Paul Hammerschmidt)
  - Investigations and Review (Chair: Jim Wright; Ranking Member: James C. Cleveland)
  - Public Buildings and Grounds (Chair: Teno Roncalio; Ranking Member: William F. Walsh)
  - Surface Transportation (Chair: James J. Howard; Ranking Member: Bud Shuster)
  - Water Resources (Chair: Ray Roberts; Ranking Member: Don H. Clausen)
- Regulate Parking (Select) (Chair: [data missing]; Ranking Member: [data missing])
- Rules (Chair: Ray Madden; Ranking Member: Jimmy Quillen)
- Science and Technology (Chair: Olin E. Teague; Ranking Member: Charles A. Mosher)
  - Energy Research, Development and Demonstration (Fossil Fuels) (Chair: Ken Hechler; Ranking Member: Alphonso Bell)
  - Space Science and Applications (Chair: Don Fuqua; Ranking Member: Larry Winn Jr.)
  - Science, Research and Technology (Chair: James W. Symington; Ranking Member: Charles A. Mosher)
  - Domestic and International Scientific Planning and Analysis (Chair: Ray Thornton; Ranking Member: John B. Conlan)
  - Energy Research, Development and Demonstration (Chair: Mike McCormack; Ranking Member: Barry M. Goldwater)
  - Environment and the Atmosphere (Chair: George Brown Jr.; Ranking Member: Marvin L. Esch)
  - Aviation and Transportation R&D (Chair: Dale Milford; Ranking Member: John W. Wydler)
- Small Business (Chair: Joe L. Evins; Ranking Member: Silvio O. Conte)
  - Energy and Environment (Chair: John Dingell; Ranking Member: Silvio O. Conte)
  - Government Procurement and International Trade (Chair: James C. Corman; Ranking Member: Joseph M. McDade)
  - Activities of Regulatory Agencies (Chair: William L. Hungate; Ranking Member: John Y. McCollister)
  - SBA and SBIC Legislation (Chair: Neal Edward Smith; Ranking Member: J. William Stanton)
  - SBA Oversight and Minority Enterprise (Chair: Joseph P. Addabbo; Ranking Member: Tim Lee Carter)
  - Commodities and Services (Chair: Charles J. Carney; Ranking Member: William S. Broomfield)
  - Antitrust, the Robinson-Patman Act and Related Matters (Ad Hoc) (Chair: [data missing]; Ranking Member: [data missing])
- Standards of Official Conduct (Chair: John Flynt; Ranking Member: Floyd D. Spence)
- Veterans' Affairs (Chair: Ray Roberts; Ranking Member: John Paul Hammerschmidt)
  - Compensation, Pension and Insurance (Chair: Sonny Montgomery; Ranking Member: Chalmers P. Wylie)
  - Education and Training (Chair: Olin E. Teague; Ranking Member: Margaret M. Heckler)
  - Hospitals (Chair: David E. Satterfield III; Ranking Member: John Paul Hammerschmidt)
  - Housing (Chair: Charles J. Carney; Ranking Member: James Abdnor)
  - Cemeteries and Burial Benefits (Chair: George E. Danielson; Ranking Member: Elwood Hillis)
- Ways and Means (Chair: Al Ullman; Ranking Member: Herman T. Schneebeli)
  - Social Security (Chair: James A. Burke; Ranking Member: Bill Archer)
  - Health (Chair: Dan Rostenkowski; Ranking Member: John J. Duncan Sr.)
  - Unemployment Compensation (Chair: James C. Corman; Ranking Member: William A. Steiger)
  - Trade (Chair: William J. Green III; Ranking Member: Barber B. Conable Jr.)
  - Public Assistance (Chair: Richard Fulton; Ranking Member: Guy Vander Jagt)
  - Oversight (Chair: Charles Vanik; Ranking Member: Donald D. Clancy)
- Whole

=== Joint committees ===
- Arrangements for the Commemoration of the Bicentennial of the United States of America (Chair: N/A; Vice Chair: N/A)
- Atomic Energy (Chair: Sen. John Pastore; Vice Chair: Rep. Charles Melvin Price)
- Congressional Operations (Chair: Rep. Jack Brooks; Vice Chair: Sen. Lee Metcalf)
- Defense Productions (Chair: Rep. Wright Patman; Vice Chair: Sen. William Proxmire)
- Economic (Chair: Sen. Hubert Humphrey; Vice Chair: Rep. Wright Patman)
- Internal Revenue Taxation (Chair: Rep. Al Ullman; Vice Chair: Sen. Russell B. Long)
- The Library (Chair: Rep. Lucien Nedzi; Vice Chair: Sen. Howard Cannon)
- Printing (Chair: Sen. Howard Cannon; Vice Chair: Rep. Wayne L. Hays)

== Employees ==
=== Legislative branch agency directors ===
- Architect of the Capitol: George Malcolm White
- Attending Physician of the United States Congress: Freeman H. Cary
- Comptroller General of the United States: Elmer B. Staats
- Director of the Congressional Budget Office: Alice M. Rivlin, from February 24, 1975
- Librarian of Congress: Daniel J. Boorstin, from November 12, 1975
- Public Printer of the United States: Thomas F. McCormick

=== Senate ===
- Chaplain: Edward L.R. Elson (Presbyterian)
- Curator: James R. Ketchum
- Historian: Richard A. Baker, from 1975
- Parliamentarian: Murray Zweben
- Secretary: Francis R. Valeo
- Librarian: Roger K. Haley
- Secretary for the Majority: J. Stanley Kimmitt
- Secretary for the Minority: W. F. Hildenbrand
- Sergeant at Arms: William H. Wannall, until December 18, 1975
  - Frank "Nordy" Hoffman, from December 18, 1975

=== House of Representatives ===
- Chaplain: Edward G. Latch (Methodist)
- Clerk: W. Pat Jennings, until November 15, 1975
  - Edmund L. Henshaw Jr., from November 15, 1975
- Doorkeeper: James T. Molloy
- Parliamentarian: William H. Brown
- Reading Clerks: Joe Bartlett (R), Charles W. Hackney Jr. (D)
- Postmaster: Robert V. Rota
- Sergeant at Arms: Kenneth R. Harding

== See also ==
- List of new members of the 94th United States Congress
- 1974 United States elections (elections leading to this Congress)
  - 1974 United States Senate elections
  - 1974 United States House of Representatives elections
- 1976 United States elections (elections during this Congress, leading to the next Congress)
  - 1976 United States presidential election
  - 1976 United States Senate elections
  - 1976 United States House of Representatives elections
- Watergate Babies
