= Kimmitt =

Kimmitt is a surname. Notable people with the surname include:

- Joseph Stanley Kimmitt (1918–2004), the Secretary of the United States Senate and Secretary for the Majority from 1977 to 1981
- Mark Kimmitt (born 1954), the 16th Assistant Secretary of State for Political-Military Affairs, under George W. Bush from Aug 2008 to Jan 2009
- Robert M. Kimmitt (born 1947), United States Deputy Secretary of the Treasury under President George W. Bush

== See also ==
- Kimi tte
- Kimito
