= Jo-Anne L. Coe =

American Senate official

Jo-Anne Lee Coe

24th Secretary of the United States Senate
- In office 1985–1987
- Leader: Bob Dole
- Preceded by: William F. Hildenbrand
- Succeeded by: Gary Lee Sisco

Personal details
- Born: Jo-Anne Lee Johnson; July 19, 1933 Coronado, California, U.S.
- Died: September 27, 2002 (aged 69) Falls Church, Virginia, U.S.
- Spouse: Benjamin P. Coe (divorced)
- Children: 1
- Parent: Roy L. Johnson (father)

Jo-Anne Lee Coe (July 19, 1933 – September 27, 2002) was the first woman to serve as Secretary of the United States Senate (1985–87), appointed by Bob Dole during his term as Senate Majority Leader in 1985.

== Early life ==
Jo-Anne Lee Johnson was born in Coronado, California, daughter of Admiral Roy L. Johnson, former Commander in Chief, United States Pacific Fleet (1965–67), and the former Margaret Louise Gross.

== Career ==
Coe worked as an aide to Harold D. Cooley in the 1960s. She joined the congressional office of Bob Dole in 1968 as a caseworker. She served as his Senate office manager and office manager during his vice presidential campaign with Gerald R. Ford. Coe was appointed as Secretary of the United States Senate by Bob Dole, Senate Majority Leader in 1985. She served in that role until 1987. She was the first woman to serve as secretary of the Senate.

After serving in this capacity, she founded and directed Senator Dole's political action committee, Campaign America. When Senator Dole formed a presidential exploratory committee in 1995, she was appointed Finance Director and also served as acting campaign manager until campaign manager Scott Reed joined the campaign staff. She continued in the role of Finance Director of the Dole campaign committee (see: 1996 United States presidential election) until she had raised the maximum allowable under federal campaign law, after which she transferred to the Republican National Committee as deputy finance chairman.

After the campaign, Coe became Senator Dole's Chief of Staff and assisted in raising money for the National World War II Memorial, the Robert J. Dole Institute of Politics, and numerous other non-profit groups in which Senator Dole took a leadership role, as well as for Republican political candidates.

== Personal life and death ==
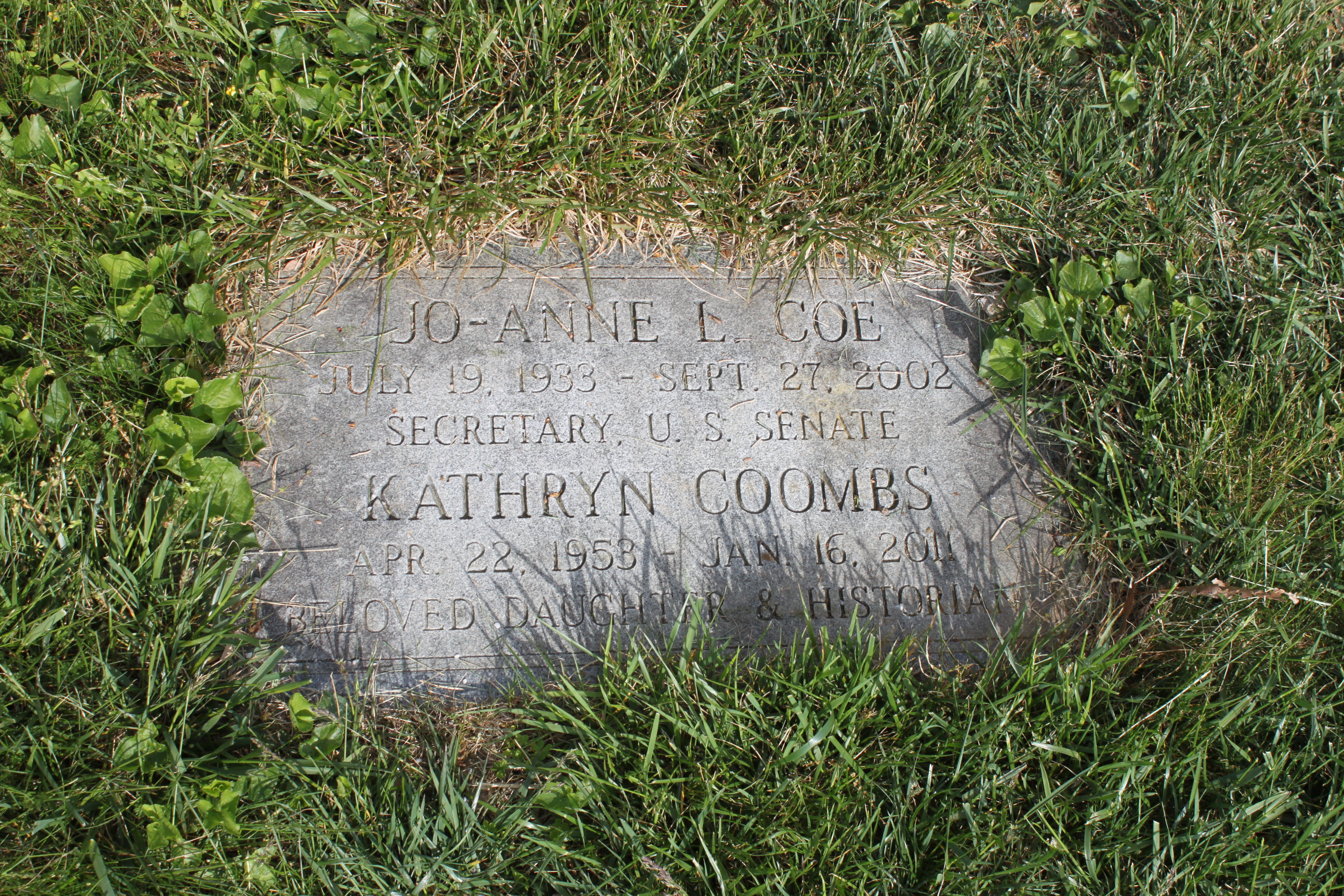
Grave of Coe and her daughter at Columbia Gardens Cemetery

While in college, she was briefly married to Benjamin P. Coe and had one daughter, Kathryn Lee Coe Coombs (1953-2011), who was married to British Member of Parliament Simon Coombs from 1983 to 2002. Her marriage with Coe ended in divorce.

Coe died on September 27, 2002, at Inova Fairfax Hospital in Falls Church, Virginia.

Government offices
Preceded by William F. Hildenbrand	24th Secretary of the United States Senate; 1985 – 1987	Succeeded by Gary Lee Sisco
