= John Hyland =

John J. Hyland
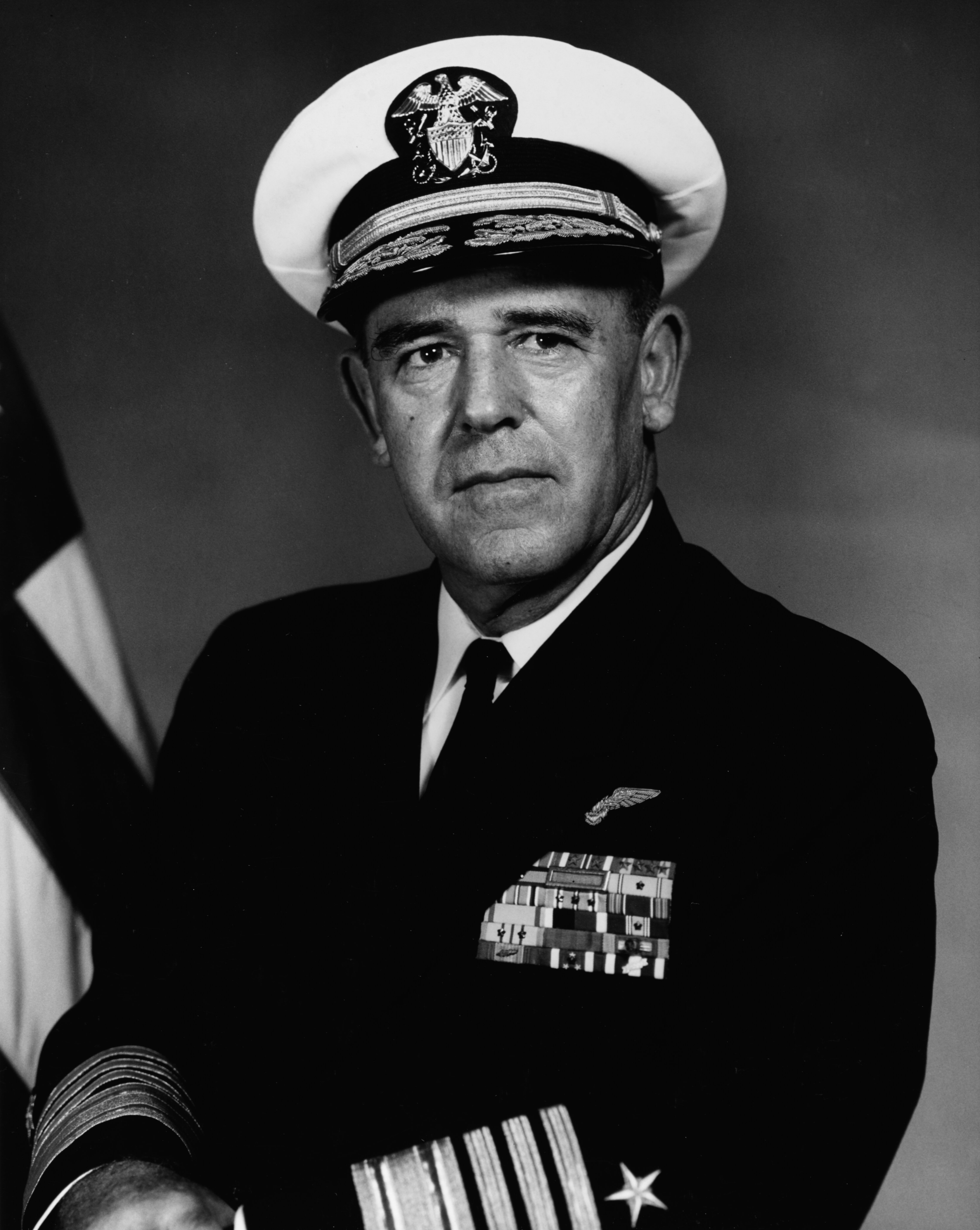
- Admiral John J. Hyland
- Born: September 1, 1912; Philadelphia, Pennsylvania, U.S.
- Died: October 25, 1998 (aged 86); Honolulu, Hawaii, U.S.
- Burial place: National Memorial Cemetery of the Pacific
- Military career
- Allegiance: United States of America
- Branch: United States Navy
- Service years: 1934–71
- Rank: Admiral
- Commands: U.S. Pacific Fleet; U.S. Seventh Fleet; Carrier Division Four; USS Saratoga; Squadron Commander, USS Intrepid
- Conflicts: World War II; Vietnam War
- Awards: Navy Distinguished Service Medal (2); Silver Star; Distinguished Flying Cross (3); Air Medal (5)

John Joseph Hyland Jr (September 1, 1912 – October 25, 1998) was an admiral in the United States Navy who commanded the U.S. Pacific Fleet from 1967 to 1970. A naval aviator, he was a champion of the aircraft carrier.

== Biography ==
Hyland was born in 1912 in Philadelphia, the son of a naval officer. He graduated from the U.S. Naval Academy in 1934 and completed naval aviation training in 1937. Posted to the Philippines, he was located there when the Japanese attacked Pearl Harbor to begin US involvement in World War II. He participated in the defense of the Philippines, and the subsequent Allied withdrawal to Australia, winning the Distinguished Flying Cross for rescuing a British airman in the Molucca Sea. He then became the personal pilot of Admiral Ernest King, then Chief of Naval Operations. Upon returning to the Pacific Theater in 1943, he took command of an air squadron based on USS Intrepid. He participated in numerous operations, earning a Silver Star for leading a ground attack against the Japanese at Kure on March 19, 1945, and another Distinguished Flying Cross and the Air Medal for other missions against the Japanese.

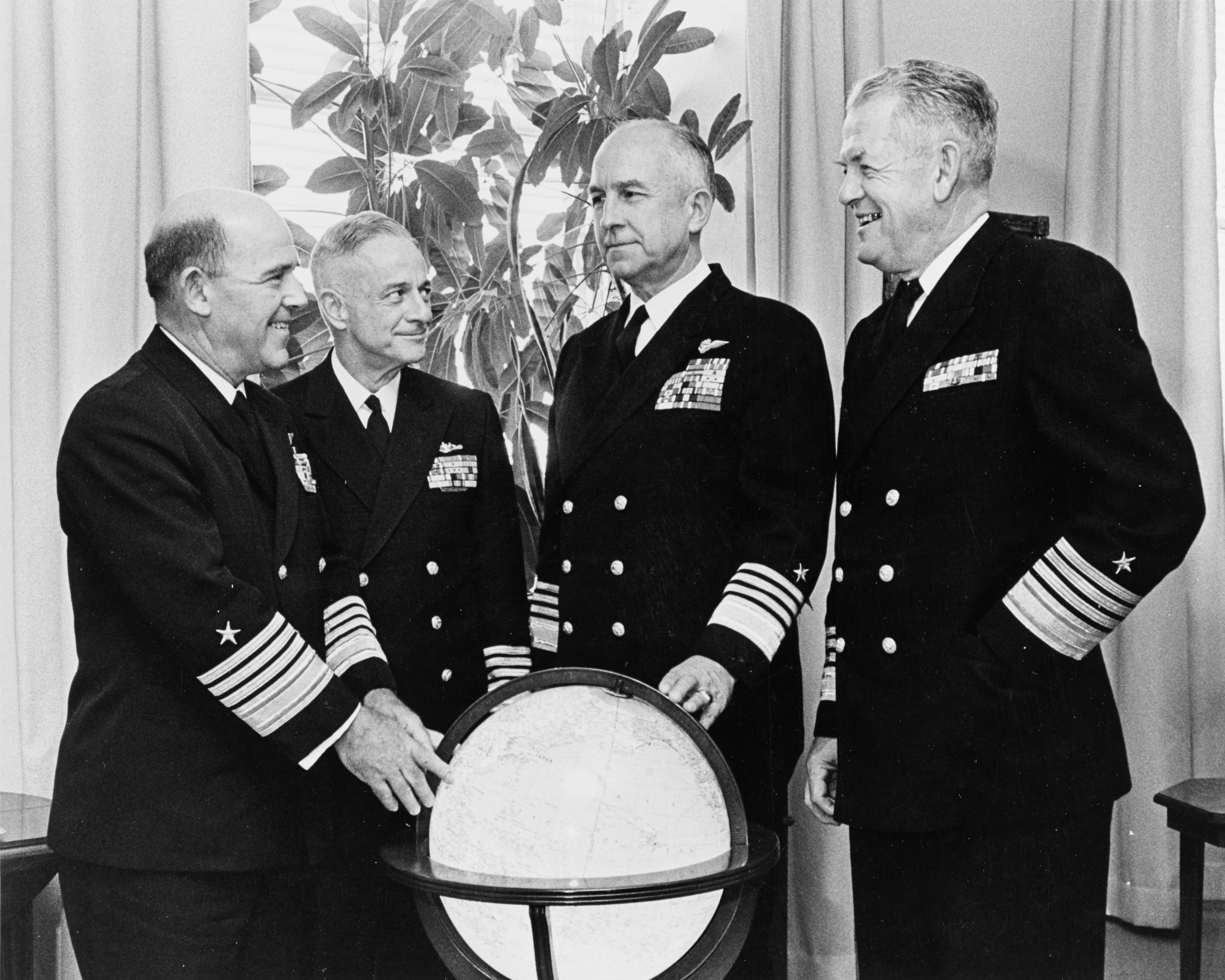
Admiral John Hyland, left, with fellow admirals John S. McCain, Thomas Moorer, and Ephraim P. Holmes in 1968

After the war, he served stints as a test pilot, then took command of the carrier USS Saratoga in 1958. He later commanded Carrier Division Four, then moved to a staff position at the Strategic Plans Division in Washington DC. In 1965, President Lyndon Johnson selected him ahead of 72 more senior rear admirals for promotion and command of the US Seventh Fleet, then operating off Vietnam and heavily involved in US operations there. Hyland commanded the fleet for nearly two years before being promoted again and taking command of the entire Pacific Fleet in 1967, a four star billet. He played a central role, not only in ongoing operations in Vietnam, but also in two major incidents during this time: the fallout of the capture of USS Pueblo by North Korea, and the fatal accident and fire on USS Enterprise.

Admiral Hyland retired on January 1, 1971. In retirement, he maintained an interest in naval aviation, served in business directorships, and settled in Honolulu. He was married to the former Florence Day Whiting, who died in 1991; they had four children: sons John J. Hyland III and Whiting Walker Hyland and daughters Nancy Arnold and Pamela Hyland.

== Awards ==
A non-exhaustive list of military awards is as follows:

Ribbon	Description	Notes
	Naval Aviator Badge	
	Navy Distinguished Service Medal	with one gold award star
	Silver Star	
	Distinguished Flying Cross	with 2 gold award stars
	Air Medal	with 4 gold award stars
	Navy Presidential Unit Citation	with one bronze service star
	Army Presidential Unit Citation	
	American Defense Service Medal	with service star
	American Campaign Medal	
	Asiatic-Pacific Campaign Medal	with seven service stars
	World War II Victory Medal	
	China Service Medal	
	Navy Occupation Service Medal	
	National Defense Service Medal	with service star
	Vietnam Service Medal	with two service stars
	Unidentified decoration	
	National Order of Vietnam	Commander
	Vietnam Gallantry Cross	with palm
	Philippine Defense Medal	with service star
	Vietnam Campaign Medal	

Admiral Hyland was also granted the John Paul Jones Award for leadership by the Navy League in 1966.

Military offices
Preceded by Roy L. Johnson	Commander in Chief of the United States Pacific Fleet; 1967–1970	Succeeded by Bernard A. Clarey
