= Roy L. Johnson =

American Four-star admiral

Roy Lee Johnson
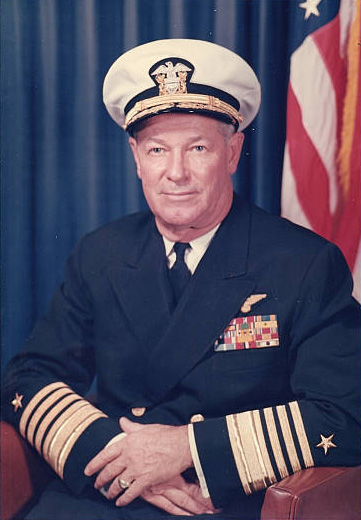
- Adm. Roy Lee Johnson, c. 1965
- Born: March 18, 1906; Eunice, Louisiana, US
- Died: March 20, 1999 (aged 93); Virginia Beach, Virginia, US
- Relatives: Jo-Anne L. Coe (daughter) Lee Johnson (son)
- Military career
- Allegiance: United States
- Branch: United States Navy
- Service years: 1929–1967
- Rank: Admiral
- Commands: Pacific Fleet; Seventh Fleet; Carrier Division Four; Carrier Air Group Two; USS Badoeng Strait (CVE-116); USS Forrestal (CVA-59)
- Conflicts: World War II: Philippines Campaign; Battle of Iwo Jima; Battle of Okinawa; Korean War; Vietnam War: Gulf of Tonkin incident
- Awards: Distinguished Service Medal (2); Legion of Merit (2); Bronze Star Medal; Air Medal
- Other work: Chairman of the Board, Virginia Beach General Hospital

Roy Lee Johnson (March 18, 1906 – March 20, 1999) was a highly decorated four-star Admiral in the United States Navy. A Naval Academy graduate, he trained as Naval aviator and distinguished himself as Air Group Commander during several World War II campaigns.

Following the War, he remained in the Navy and was the first captain of the Forrestal (CVA-59) first of the new supercarriers, commissioned in 1955. Johnson rose to the Flag rank and commanded the United States Seventh Fleet during the Gulf of Tonkin Incident on August 2, 1964. He was subsequently promoted to four-star rank and became Commander-in-Chief, United States Pacific Fleet.

== Early life and career ==
Roy L. Johnson was born on March 18, 1906, in Eunice, Louisiana, to John Edward Johnson and the former Hetty Mae Long, as the eldest of 12 children. He completed high school and earned an appointment to the United States Naval Academy at Annapolis, Maryland on June 15, 1925. While at Annapolis he played varsity baseball and was on the staff of academy yearbook, the Lucky Bag. Johnson graduated with Bachelor of Science degree on June 6, 1929, and was commissioned Ensign on that date. He also married the former Margaret Louise Gross (November 26, 1910 – July 4, 1998), on the same day.

His first assignment as a junior officer was aboard the battleship USS Tennessee and remained with that ship until May 1930, when he was transferred to the battleship USS West Virginia for duty on the staff of Commander Battleship Divisions, Battle Fleet under Admiral Frank H. Schofield.

During 1930, he underwent preliminary flight training at the Naval Air Station North Island, San Diego, which he completed on January 28, 1931, and began flight training at the Naval flight school at Naval Air Station Pensacola, Florida, known as the "Cradle of US Naval Aviation". One year later he was designated a Naval Aviator. Johnson later served as a flight instructor at Pensacola.

In June 1940 he was ordered to Patrol Squadron Twelve and one year later, on March 28, 1941, he was assigned to the Bureau of Aeronautics, Navy Department in Washington, D.C., where he served consecutively under admirals John H. Towers and John S. McCain Sr.

== World War II ==
Following the United States entry into the World War II, Johnson was promoted to the temporary rank of Lieutenant commander on January 1, 1942. He remained with the Bureau through the early portion of World War II, and in May 1943 he was transferred to Fleet Air Command, Naval Air Station Quonset Point as Commander Carrier Air Group Two. In early 1944, the Air Group joined the aircraft carrier Hornet (CV-12).

Johnson later became the executive officer of that ship, which would later become known as the "Grey Ghost". As air group commander ("CAG"), he directed and led attacks against Japanese forces at Palau, Woleai, Wake Island and Truk, striking against enemy aircraft, airfields, shipping and shore installations. For his service as air group commander, he was awarded the Air Medal. Later, he received the Bronze Star Medal and a second Legion of Merit, with Combat "V" for his service in action, which included campaigns against Japanese forces in the Philippines, Iwo Jima and Okinawa. He also wore a Presidential Unit Citation, which was awarded to Hornet for her part in these campaigns.

== Korea and later service ==
On October 3, 1945, he was assigned to the office of the Joint Chiefs of Staff, where he served until July 1947, when he became the aviation operations officer on the staff of Commander Second Fleet in Norfolk, Virginia. In January 1950, he was assigned as training officer on the Staff of the Chief of Naval Air Reserve Training at Naval Air Station Glenview, Illinois.

On November 15, 1951, during the Korean War, Johnson became the commanding officer of the escort carrier Badoeng Strait (CVE-116); affectionately known by her crew as the "Bing Ding". She was awarded the Navy Unit Commendation. He served as the commanding officer until July 1952, when he ordered to the National War College in Washington D.C. for a year's course in modern warfare techniques and strategies.

For two years after completing the War College program, he served as the Head of the Air Weapons System Analysis Staff and in the office of the Deputy Chief of Naval Operations, (Air). In May 1955 he reported to Norfolk, Virginia as the Prospective Commanding Officer, (PCO) of the Navy's first "supercarrier", under construction.

Therefore, Johnson became the first commanding officer of the 60,000-ton attack aircraft carrier Forrestal (CVA-59) on her commissioning day, October 1, 1955, at Newport News Shipbuilding and Dry Dock Company, Newport News, Virginia.

== Vietnam War ==
Three months later, on January 1, 1956, he was promoted to the rank of rear admiral. In June of that year, Admiral Johnson was named director of the Long Range Objectives Group, in the Office of the Chief of Naval Operations.

In December 1958, he assumed command of Carrier Division Four, and a year later, on January 25, 1960, he was named Assistant Chief of Naval Operations for Plans and Policy. On December 15, 1961, he was promoted to vice admiral and a month later became deputy director of Joint Strategic Target Planning, headquartered at Offutt Air Force Base, Omaha, Nebraska. While in this capacity, Johnson was the Navy's senior representative in determining U.S. air strike priorities during the 1962 Cuban Missile Crisis.

On July 30, 1963, he assumed the duties of Deputy Commander in Chief of the US Pacific Fleet, at Pearl Harbor, Hawaii. While in this capacity, Johnson served consecutively as Deputy to Admirals John H. Sides, U. S. Grant Sharp Jr. and Thomas H. Moorer.

Admiral Johnson assumed duty as Commander-in-Chief, United States Seventh Fleet in mid-June 1964 and held that assignment during Gulf of Tonkin incident in August that year, when the United States entered the Vietnam War. USS Salisbury Sound (AV-13) from his Fleet became the first U.S. Navy ship to conduct operations inside Vietnam coastal waters. Salisbury Sound set up a seadrome in Da Nang Bay and conducted seaplane patrols in support of Operation Flaming Dart, the bombing of North Vietnamese army camps. Johnson commanded Seventh Fleet until the beginning of March 1965 and received the Navy Distinguished Service Medal for his service in Southeast Asia.

Following a brief leave with his family, Johnson was promoted to the rank of four-star Admiral on March 31, 1965, and ordered to Pearl Harbor Navy Yard, Hawaii, where he assumed duty as the Commander-in-Chief, United States Pacific Fleet. While in this capacity, he had over 450 vessels under his command and also had Fleet Marine Force, Pacific under his operational control. The units under his command conducted air strikes against North Vietnam's targets including enemy's supply installations in Haiphong.

He remained in that capacity until the end of November 1967, when he retired from active service after 38 years. Johnson received his second Navy Distinguished Service Medal for service with the Pacific Fleet.

== Post-Navy career ==
Upon his retirement from the Navy, Johnson settled to Virginia Beach, Virginia, where he was active in local civic affairs and served as chairman of the board of Virginia Beach General Hospital. He also served as chairman of numerous Naval organizations, including the Early and Pioneer Naval Aviators Association; the United States Naval Academy Alumni Association and the Golden Eagles. He was also a founding trustee of the USS Forrestal Memorial Education Foundation. In 1967, the Tailhook Association, named him Tailhooker of the year.

Admiral Roy L. Johnson, USN (Ret), died of respiratory failure on Navy Day, March 20, 1999, two days after his 93rd birthday. He is buried at Woodlawn Memorial Gardens in Norfolk, Virginia together with his wife Margaret. They had two children: a son Roy Lee Johnson Jr. and a daughter, Jo-Anne L. Coe, who served as the first woman to serve as the Secretary of the United States Senate and as Chief of Staff to Senator Bob Dole.

== Awards and honors ==
Here is the ribbon bar of Admiral Roy L. Johnson:

Naval Aviator Badge
| 1st Row | Navy Distinguished Service Medal with one 5/16" Gold Star | | |
| 2nd Row | Legion of Merit with Combat "V" and one 5/16" Gold Star | Bronze Star Medal with Combat "V" | Air Medal |
| 3rd Row | Navy Presidential Unit Citation with one star | Navy Unit Commendation | China Service Medal |
| 4th Row | American Defense Service Medal with Clasp | American Campaign Medal | Asiatic–Pacific Campaign Medal with three 3/16 inch bronze service stars |
| 5th Row | World War II Victory Medal | Navy Occupation Service Medal | National Defense Service Medal with one star |
| 6th Row | Korean Service Medal | Vietnam Service Medal with one 3/16 inch bronze service star | Philippine Liberation Medal with two service stars |
| 7th Row | Korea Presidential Unit Citation with service star | United Nations Korea Medal | Vietnam Campaign Medal |

Military offices
| Preceded by Thomas H. Moorer | Commander-in-Chief, United States Pacific Fleet; March 30, 1965 - November 30, 1967 | Succeeded by John J. Hyland |
| Preceded by Thomas H. Moorer | Commander-in-Chief, United States Seventh Fleet; June 15, 1964 - March 1, 1965 | Succeeded by Paul P. Blackburn |
