= William Hildenbrand =

American government officer

23rd Secretary of the United States Senate
- In office January 5, 1981 – January 2, 1985
- Leader: Howard Baker
- Preceded by: Joseph Stanley Kimmitt
- Succeeded by: Jo-Anne L. Coe

Personal details
- Born: November 28, 1921 Pottstown, Pennsylvania
- Died: July 21, 2011 (aged 89)

William F. Hildenbrand (November 28, 1921 – July 21, 2011) was an American government officer who served as the Secretary of the United States Senate from 1981 to 1985.

== Biography ==
Hildenbrand was born in Pottstown, Pennsylvania, on November 28, 1921. He enlisted in the United States Army in 1942 during World War II and was sent to Europe in the infantry. He returned to Philadelphia following the end of World War II, where he worked as a radio announcer. He was once again deployed by the Army during the Korean War.

Hildenbrand was hired as a congressional staffer by Rep. Hal Haskell, a Republican from Delaware, in 1957, based moved to Washington D.C. Haskell lost his bid for re-election in 1958, so Hildenbrand took a position with the Department of Health, Education and Welfare. In 1969, Hildenbrand returned to the Capitol when he was hired as a staff member for the Republican Minority Whip, Senator Hugh Scott of Pennsylvania.

Hildenbrand became the Secretary for the Minority of the Senate in 1974. Republicans won control of the United States Senate in the 1980 Senate elections and took control of the chamber in January 1981. Hildenbrand aided Senate Majority Leader Howard Baker in the transition from Democratic control to Republican control, the first such transfer of party control in the Senate in twenty-six years.

The Republicans named Hildenbrand as the Secretary of the United States Senate in 1981. He served as Secretary until his retirement in 1985.

Hildenbrand released a memoir entitled, When the Senate Cared, in 2007. He also added his stories and history to the Senate's oral history archive for preservation.

Hildenbrand died on July 21, 2011, at the age of 89. The United States Senate passed a resolution honoring him for his service to the chamber.

Government offices
Preceded by Joseph Stanley Kimmitt	23rd Secretary of the United States Senate; 1981 – 1985	Succeeded by Jo-Anne L. Coe
