= Joseph Stanley Kimmitt =

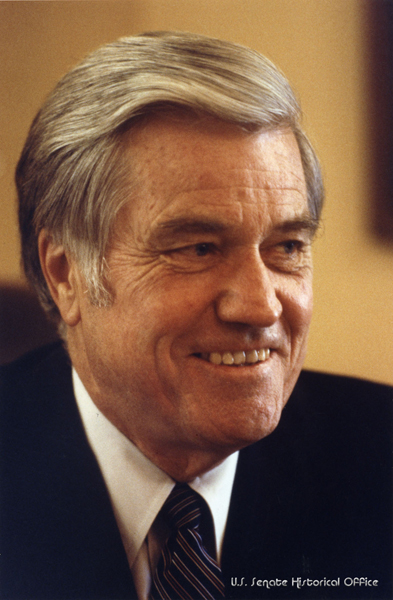

22nd Secretary of the United States Senate
- In office April 1, 1977 – January 4, 1981
- Leader: Robert Byrd
- Preceded by: Francis R. Valeo
- Succeeded by: William Hildenbrand

Secretary for the Majority of the United States Senate
- In office 1966–1977
- Preceded by: Francis R. Valeo
- Succeeded by: James H. Duffy

Personal details
- Born: Joseph Stanley Kimmitt; April 15, 1918 Lewistown, Montana, U.S.
- Died: December 7, 2004 (aged 86)
- Party: Democratic

Joseph Stanley Kimmitt (April 15, 1918 – December 7, 2004) was the Secretary of the United States Senate and Secretary for the Majority from 1977 to 1981. Kimmitt also served in World War II and the Korean War as a United States Army lieutenant colonel. Kimmitt commanded a unit in the 8th Infantry Division in Germany from 1962 to 1964 before retiring from the Army as a colonel. He went to work under Mike Mansfield, U.S. Senator from Montana, before becoming Secretary. Upon leaving the Senate, Kimmitt then worked on the APACHE (Attack Helicopter) program. Kimmitt later founded Kimmitt, Senter, Coates, & Weinfurter, Inc. (KSC&W), a Washington, D.C. lobbying firm. Stan Kimmitt died in 2004.

Joseph went to the University of Montana.

Three sons went into the military, all Field Artillery, including Brigadier General Mark Kimmitt, who served as Assistant Secretary of State for Political-Military Affairs, Major Joseph (Jay) Kimmitt, and Major General Robert Kimmitt, who served as Deputy Secretary of the Treasury, both under President George W. Bush. J. Stanley Kimmitt and his wife, Eunice Kimmitt, also had three daughters, Kathleen Ross, Mary Kimmitt Laxton, and Judy Kimmitt Rainey and one other son, Thomas Patrick Kimmitt, who went to Georgetown University and then to medical school.

Government offices
Preceded by Francis R. Valeo	22nd Secretary of the United States Senate; 1977 – 1981	Succeeded by William F. Hildenbrand
