= List of new members of the 91st United States Congress =

The 91st United States Congress began on January 3, 1969. There were 12 new senators (four Democrats, eight Republicans) and 38 new representatives (19 Democrats, 19 Republicans), as well as one new delegate (a Democrat), at the start of the first session. Additionally, four senators (two Democrats, two Republicans) and 14 representatives (seven Democrats, seven Republicans) took office on various dates in order to fill vacancies during the 91st Congress before it ended on January 3, 1971.

Due to redistricting in multiple states, eight representatives were elected from newly created seats.

== Senate ==
=== Took office January 3, 1969 ===
State	Image	Senator	Seniority	Switched party	Prior background	Birth year	Ref
Alabama		James Allen (D)	10th (98th overall)	No; Open seat; replaced J. Lister Hill (D)	Lieutenant Governor of Alabama; Alabama Senate; Alabama House of Representatives; U.S. Navy Reserve	1912	
Alaska		Mike Gravel (D)	12th (100th overall)	No; Defeated Ernest Gruening (D) in a primary (Note: Gruening ran in the general election as a write-in candidate and was subsequently defeated by Gravel.)	Speaker of the Alaska House of Representatives; Counterintelligence Corps	1930	
Arizona		Barry Goldwater (R)	1st (89th overall)	Yes; Open seat; replaced Carl Hayden (D)	U.S. Senate (Note: Previously elected to the 83rd Congress, serving from 1953 to 1965.); Phoenix City Council; U.S. Air Force Major General	1909	
California (Class 3)		Alan Cranston (D)	8th (96th overall)	Yes; Replaced Thomas Kuchel (R), who was defeated in a primary	California State Controller; President of United World Federalists; U.S. Army	1914	
Florida		Edward Gurney (R)	5th (93rd overall)	Yes; Open seat; replaced George Smathers (D)	U.S. House of Representatives (Note: Elected to the 88th Congress, serving from 1963 to 1967 in Florida's 11th district, and from 1967 to 1969 in the 5th district.); Mayor of Winter Park; U.S. Army Lieutenant Colonel	1914	
Iowa		Harold Hughes (D)	6th (94th overall)	Yes; Open seat; replaced Bourke B. Hickenlooper (R)	Governor of Iowa; U.S. Army Private	1922	
Kansas		Bob Dole (R)	4th (92nd overall)	No; Open seat; replaced Frank Carlson (R)	U.S. House of Representatives (Note: Elected to the 87th Congress, serving from 1961 to 1963 in Kansas's 6th district, and from 1963 to 1969 in the 1st district.); Russell County Attorney; Kansas House of Representatives; U.S. Army Captain	1923	
Maryland		Charles Mathias (R)	3rd (91st overall)	Yes; Defeated Daniel Brewster (D)	U.S. House of Representatives (Note: Elected to the 87th Congress, serving from 1961 to 1969 in Maryland's 6th district.); Maryland House of Delegates; Frederick City Attorney; U.S. Navy Reserve Captain	1922	
Ohio		William B. Saxbe (R)	9th (97th overall)	Yes; Replaced Frank Lausche (D), who was defeated in a primary	Ohio Attorney General; Speaker of the Ohio House of Representatives; U.S. Army Air Corps	1916	
Oklahoma		Henry Bellmon (R)	7th (95th overall)	Yes; Defeated Mike Monroney (D)	Governor of Oklahoma; Oklahoma House of Representatives; U.S. Marine Corps	1921	
Oregon		Bob Packwood (R)	11th (99th overall)	Yes; Defeated Wayne Morse (D)	Oregon House of Representatives	1932	
Pennsylvania		Richard Schweiker (R)	2nd (90th overall)	Yes; Defeated Joseph S. Clark Jr. (D)	U.S. House of Representatives (Note: Elected to the 87th Congress, serving from 1961 to 1969 in Pennsylvania's 13th district.); U.S. Navy	1926	

=== Took office during the 91st Congress ===
State	Image	Senator	Took office	Switched party	Prior background	Birth year	Ref
Illinois		Ralph T. Smith (R)	September 17, 1969	No; Appointed; replaced Everett Dirksen (R)	Speaker of the Illinois House of Representatives; U.S. Navy Reserve	1915	
Illinois		Adlai Stevenson III (D)	November 17, 1970	Yes; Defeated Ralph T. Smith (R)	Illinois Treasurer; Illinois House of Representatives; U.S. Marine Corps Captain	1930	
Delaware		William Roth (R)	January 1, 1971	No; Open seat; replaced John J. Williams (R)	U.S. House of Representatives (Note: Elected to the 90th Congress, serving from 1967 to 1970 in Delaware's at-large district.); Chair of the Republican State Committee of Delaware; U.S. Army	1921	
California (Class 1)		John V. Tunney (D)	January 2, 1971	Yes; Defeated George Murphy (R)	U.S. House of Representatives (Note: Elected to the 89th Congress, serving from 1965 to 1971 in California's 38th district.); U.S. Air Force Captain	1934	

== House of Representatives ==
=== Took office January 3, 1969 ===
District	Representative	Switched party	Prior background	Birth year	Ref
Alabama 5	Walter Flowers (D)	No	Lawyer	1933	
Arkansas 1	Bill Alexander (D)	No	Law clerk	1934	
California 17	Glenn M. Anderson (D)	No	Lieutenant Governor of California	1913	
Connecticut 4	Lowell Weicker (R)	Yes	State Representative	1931	
Florida 4	Bill Chappell (D)	No	State House Speaker	1922	
Florida 5	Lou Frey (R)	No	Lawyer	1934	
Idaho 2	Orval H. Hansen (R)	No	State Senator	1926	
Illinois 2	Abner Mikva (D)	No	State Representative	1926	
Indiana 2	Earl Landgrebe (R)	No	State Senator	1916	
Indiana 10	David W. Dennis (R)	New seat	State Representative	1912	
Kansas 1	Keith Sebelius (R)	No	State Senator	1916	
Louisiana 3	Patrick T. Caffery (D)	No	State Representative	1932	
Maryland 5	Lawrence Hogan (R)	Yes	FBI agent	1928	
Maryland 6	J. Glenn Beall Jr. (R)	No	State Delegate	1927	
Missouri 1	Bill Clay (D)	No	Alderman	1931	
Missouri 2	James W. Symington (D)	Yes	U.S. Chief of Protocol	1927	
Missouri 10	Bill Burlison (D)	No	Lawyer	1931	
New Mexico 1	Manuel Lujan Jr. (R)	New seat	Insurance businessman	1928	
New Mexico 2	Ed Foreman (R)	New seat	U.S. Representative (Note: Previously elected to the 88th Congress, serving from 1963 to 1965 in Texas's 16th district.)	1933	
New York 5	Allard K. Lowenstein (D)	No	Congressional aide	1929	
New York 12	Shirley Chisholm (D)	New seat	State Assemblywoman	1924	
New York 17	Ed Koch (D)	Yes	City Councillor	1924	
New York 24	Mario Biaggi (D)	Yes	Police lieutenant	1917	
New York 27	Martin B. McKneally (R)	Yes	Commander of the American Legion	1914	
New York 28	Hamilton Fish IV (R)	Yes	U.S. Foreign Service officer	1926	
New York 38	James F. Hastings (R)	No	State Senator	1926	
North Carolina 5	Wilmer Mizell (R)	New seat	Professional baseball player	1930	
North Carolina 6	L. Richardson Preyer (D)	No	U.S. District Court Judge	1919	
North Carolina 8	Earl B. Ruth (R)	New seat	City Councillor	1916	
Ohio 21	Louis Stokes (D)	New seat	Lecturer	1925	
Oklahoma 6	John Newbold Camp (R)	New seat	State Representative	1908	
Pennsylvania 6	Gus Yatron (D)	No	State Senator	1927	
Pennsylvania 13	Lawrence Coughlin (R)	No	State Senator	1929	
South Carolina 4	James Mann (D)	No	State Representative	1920	
Virginia 2	G. William Whitehurst (R)	Yes	Journalist	1925	
Virginia 5	Dan Daniel (D)	No	State Delegate	1914	
West Virginia 1	Bob Mollohan (D)	Yes	U.S. Representative (Note: Previously elected to the 83rd Congress, serving from 1953 to 1957.)	1909	
Wyoming at-large	John S. Wold (R)	No	State Party Chair	1916	

==== Non-voting members ====
District	Delegate	Switched party	Prior background	Birth year	Ref
Puerto Rico at-large	Jorge Luis Córdova (NP/D)	Yes/No (Note: The previous delegate, Santiago Polanco-Abreu, was registered as Popular Democratic/Democratic.)	Supreme Court of Puerto Rico	1907	

=== Took office during the 91st Congress ===
District	Representative	Took office	Switched party	Prior background	Birth year	Ref
Tennessee 8	Ed Jones (D)	March 25, 1969	No	State Agriculture Commissioner	1912	
Wisconsin 7	Dave Obey (D)	April 1, 1969	Yes	State Assemblyman	1938	
California 27	Barry Goldwater Jr. (R)	April 29, 1969	No	Public relations executive	1938	
Montana 2	John Melcher (D)	June 24, 1969	Yes	State Senator	1924	
Massachusetts 6	Michael J. Harrington (D)	September 30, 1969	Yes	State Representative	1936	
New Jersey 8	Robert A. Roe (D)	November 4, 1969	No	State Conservation Commissioner	1924	
Illinois 13	Phil Crane (R)	November 25, 1969	No	Educator	1930	
California 24	John H. Rousselot (R)	June 30, 1970	No	U.S. Representative (Note: Previously elected to the 87th Congress, serving from 1961 to 1963 in the 25th district.)	1927	
California 35	John G. Schmitz (R)	June 30, 1970	No	State Senator	1930	
Connecticut 2	Robert H. Steele (R)	November 3, 1970	Yes	Securities analyst	1938	
Illinois 6	George W. Collins (D)	November 3, 1970	No	Alderman	1925	
New Jersey 6	Edwin B. Forsythe (R)	November 3, 1970	No	State Senator	1916	
Ohio 19	Charles J. Carney (D)	November 3, 1970	No	State Senator	1913	
Pennsylvania 9	John H. Ware III (R)	November 3, 1970	No	State Senator	1908	

== See also ==
- List of United States representatives in the 91st Congress
- List of United States senators in the 91st Congress

== Notes ==
Preceded by New members of the 90th Congress	New members of the 91st Congress; 1969–1971	Succeeded by New members of the 92nd Congress
