= 1973 American Samoan constitutional referendum =

American Samoan ballot measure

- November 6, 1973

Results
Choice	Votes	%
Yes	1,097	34.35%
No	2,097	65.65%

A constitutional referendum was held in American Samoa on November 6, 1973. Voters were asked to whether they approved of a new constitution, The new constitution provided for the direct election of the Governor and Lieutenant Governor, a doubling of the salaries for members of the Fono, issuing government bonds to raise money, and decentralizing some powers to counties and villages.

As with the previous referendum in 1972, the proposals were rejected, with 34% in favor and 66% against.

== Results ==
The new constitution was expected to be approved, but was rejected by nearly two-thirds of voters.

Choice	Votes	%
For	1,097	34.35
Against	2,097	65.65
Total	3,194	100.00
Registered voters/turnout	6,435	–
Source: PIM

== Aftermath ==
An identical measure on directly electing the Governor would be put before voters two more times in 1974 and August 1976 until it was approved in November 1976.
