= 1972 American Samoan referendum =

American Samoan ballot measure

A referendum on direct election of governors and vice governors was held in American Samoa on 7 November 1972 alongside legislative elections. Voters were asked to approve a proposal which permitted direct popular election of governors and lieutenant governors. The turnout of 28.20% was very low, and the measure was rejected, with 17.30% voting yes and 82.70 voting no.

== Results ==
Choice	Votes	%
For		17.3
Against		82.7
Invalid/blank votes		–
Total		100
Registered voters/turnout		28.2
Source: Direct Democracy

== Aftermath ==
Following the referendum, Governor John Morse Haydon was called before a Civil Service Commission tribunal, having been charged with pressurising district governors to encourage voters to vote against the proposals, and of using state radio and television to oppose the proposal on the day before the vote and polling day. However, the charges were dismissed as it was determined that Haydon had not violated the Hatch Act of 1939, as it only applied to elections and not referendums.

An identical measure would be put before voters three more times in 1973, 1974 and August 1976 until it was approved in November 1976.
