= American Civil War prison camps =

Lists of prisoner of war camps

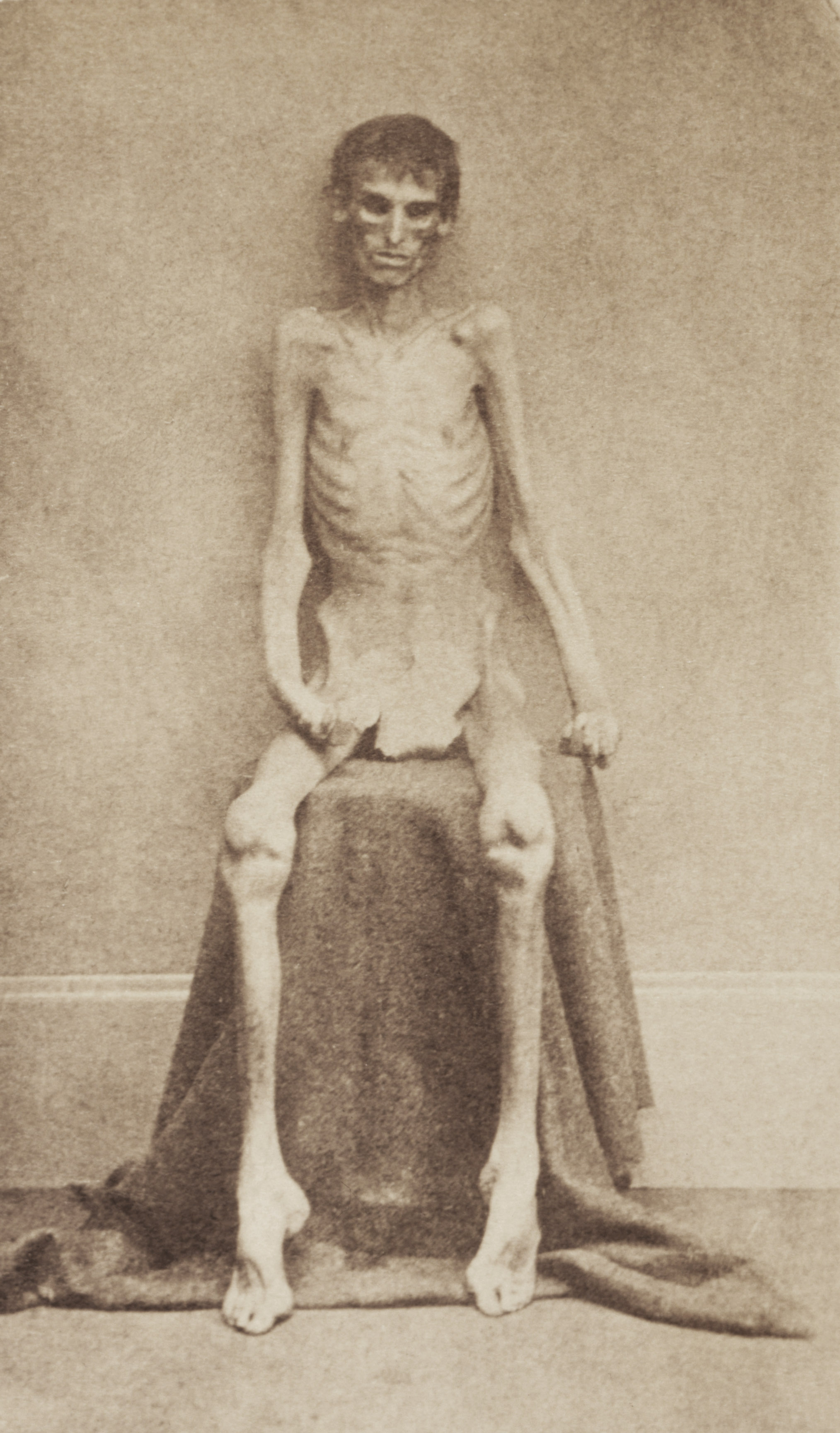
A Union Army soldier barely alive in Georgia on his release in 1865. Both Confederate and Union prisoners of war suffered great hardships during their captivity.

Between 1861 and 1865, American Civil War prison camps were operated by the Union and the Confederacy to detain over 400,000 captured soldiers. From the start of the Civil War through to 1863 a parole exchange system saw most prisoners of war swapped relatively quickly. However, from 1863 this broke down following the Confederacy's refusal to treat black and white Union prisoners equally, leading to soaring numbers held on both sides.

Records indicate the capture of 211,411 Union soldiers, with 16,668 paroled and 30,218 died in captivity; of Confederate soldiers, 462,684 were captured, 247,769 paroled and 25,976 died in captivity. Just over 5.6% of the captives in Northern prisons died, compared to 14.29% for Southern prisons.

Lorien Foote has noted, "the suffering of prisoners did more to inhibit postwar reconciliation than any other episode of the war."

== Parole ==
Lacking means for dealing with large numbers of captured troops early in the American Civil War, the Union and Confederate governments both relied on the traditional European system of parole and exchange of prisoners. A prisoner who was on parole promised not to fight again until his name was "exchanged" for a similar man on the other side. Then both of them could rejoin their units. While awaiting exchange, prisoners were briefly confined to permanent camps. The exchange system broke down in mid-1863 when the Confederacy refused to treat captured black prisoners as equal to white prisoners. The prison populations on both sides then soared. There were 32 major Confederate prisons, 16 of them in the Deep South states of Georgia, Alabama, and South Carolina. Training camps were often turned into prisons, and new prisons also had to be made. The North had a much larger population than the South, and Gen. Ulysses S. Grant was well aware that keeping its soldiers in Northern prisons hurt the Southern economy and war effort.

=== Prisoner exchanges ===
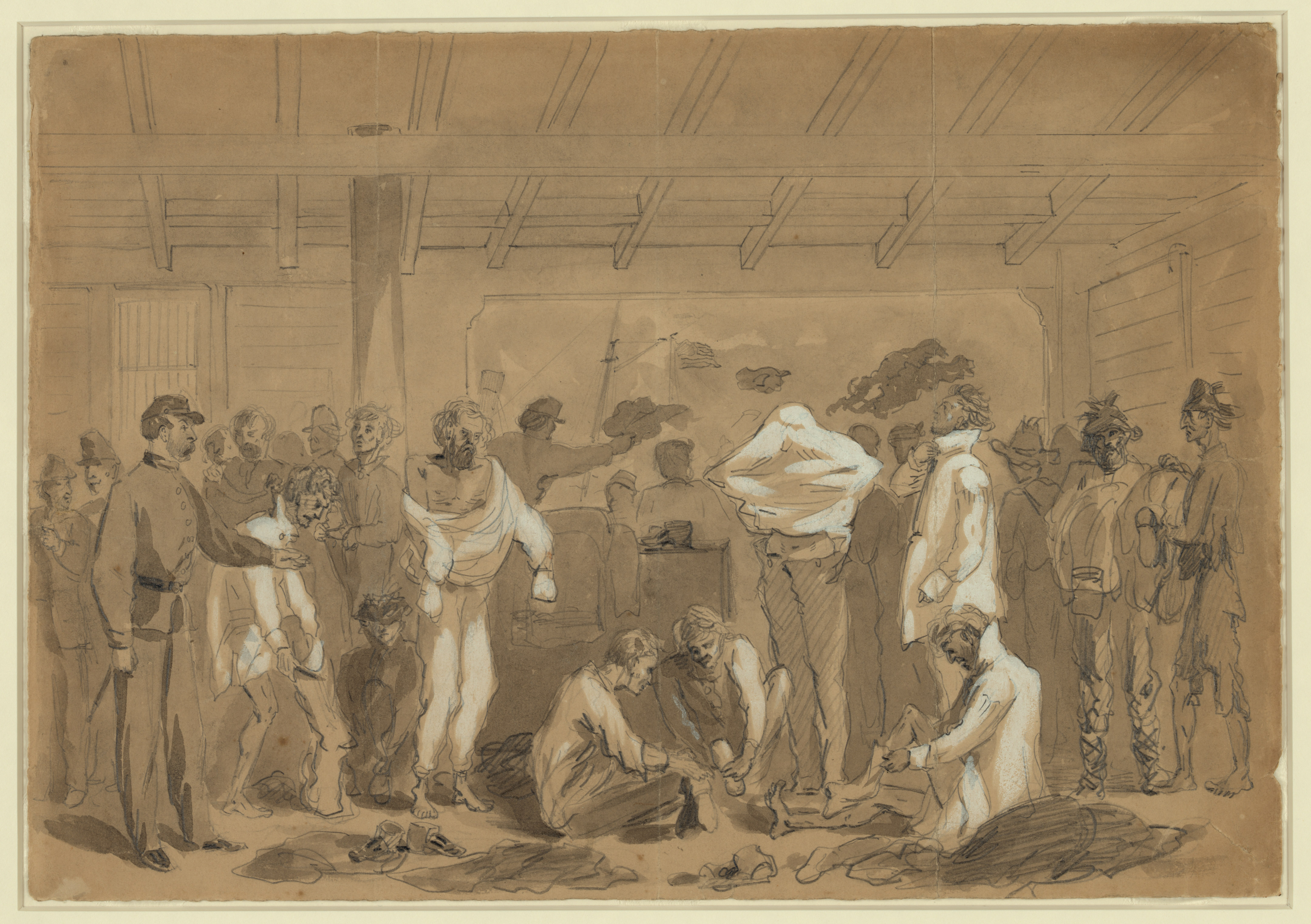
Returned prisoners of war exchanging their rags for new clothing, drawn by William Waud

At the outbreak of the war, the federal government avoided any action, including prisoner exchanges, that might be viewed as official recognition of the Confederate government in Richmond. Public opinion forced a change after the First Battle of Bull Run, when the Confederates captured over one thousand Union soldiers.

Union and Confederate forces exchanged prisoners sporadically, often as an act of humanity between opposing commanders. Support for prisoner exchanges grew throughout the initial months of the war, as the North saw increasing numbers of its soldiers captured. Petitions from prisoners in the South and editorials in Northern newspapers brought pressure on the Lincoln administration. On December 11, 1861, the US Congress passed a joint resolution calling on President Lincoln to "inaugurate systematic measures for the exchange of prisoners in the present rebellion". In two meetings on February 23 and March 1, 1862, Union Major Gen. John E. Wool and Confederate Brig. Gen. Howell Cobb met to reach an agreement on prisoner exchanges. They discussed many of the provisions later adopted in the Dix-Hill agreement. However, differences over which side would cover expenses for prisoner transportation stymied the negotiations.

=== Dix-Hill Cartel of 1862 ===
Prison camps were largely empty in mid-1862, thanks to the informal exchanges. Both sides agreed to formalize the system. Negotiations resumed in July 1862, when Union Maj. Gen. John A. Dix and Confederate Maj. Gen. D. H. Hill were assigned the task. The agreement established a scale of equivalents for the exchange of military officers and enlisted men. Thus a navy captain or an army colonel was worth fifteen privates or ordinary seamen, while personnel of equal ranks were exchanged man for man. Each government appointed an agent to handle the exchange and parole of prisoners. The agreement also allowed the exchange of non-combatants, such as citizens accused of "disloyalty", and civilian employees of the military, and allowed the informal exchange or parole of captives between the commanders of the opposing forces.

Authorities were to parole any prisoners not formally exchanged within ten days following their capture. The terms of the cartel prohibited paroled prisoners from returning to the military in any capacity including "the performance of field, garrison, police, or guard, or constabulary duty".

=== End of exchanges ===
The exchange system collapsed in 1863 because the Confederacy refused to treat Black prisoners the same as Whites. They said they were probably ex-slaves and belonged to their masters, not to the Union Army. The South needed the exchanges much more than the North did, because of the severe manpower shortage in the Confederacy. In 1864 Ulysses Grant, noting the "prisoner gap" (Union camps held far more prisoners than Confederate camps), decided that the growing prisoner gap gave him a decided military advantage. He therefore opposed wholesale exchanges until the end was in sight. Around 5,600 Confederates were allowed to join the Union Army. Known as "galvanized Yankees" these troops were stationed in the West facing Indians.

Prisoner exchanges resumed early in 1865, just before the war's end, with the Confederates sending 17,000 prisoners North while receiving 24,000 men. On April 23, after the war ended, the riverboat Sultana was taking 1900 ex-prisoners North on the Mississippi River when it exploded, killing about 1500 of them.

== Death rates ==
The overall mortality rates in prisons on both sides were similar, and quite high. Many Southern prisons were located in regions with high disease rates, and were routinely short of medicine, doctors, food and ice. Northerners often believed their men were being deliberately weakened and killed in Confederate prisons, and demanded that conditions in Northern prisons be equally harsh, even though shortages were not a problem in the North.

About 56,000 soldiers died in prisons during the war, accounting for almost 10% of all Civil War fatalities. During a period of 14 months in Camp Sumter, located near Andersonville, Georgia, 13,000 (28%) of the 45,000 Union soldiers confined there died. At Camp Douglas in Chicago, Illinois, 10% of its Confederate prisoners died during one cold winter month; and Elmira Prison in New York state, with a death rate of 25%, very nearly equaled that of Andersonville.

== Main camps ==
Combatant	Name	Location	Notes	Image
Union	Camp Chase	Columbus, Ohio	Established in May 1861 and closed in 1865. The camp's original capacity was for 4,000 men, but at times more than 7,000 prisoners were accommodated. The capacity was increased to 7,000, but towards the end of the war up to 10,000 men were crammed into the facility. See also the Confederate Soldier Memorial to the Confederate dead at Camp Chase, dedicated in 1909	
Union	Camp Douglas	Chicago, Illinois	Camp Douglas, sometimes described as "The North's Andersonville", was the largest Union POW Camp. The Union Army first used the camp in 1861 as an organizational and training camp for volunteer regiments. It became a prisoner-of-war camp in early 1862 and is noteworthy due to its poor living conditions and a death rate of roughly 15%. Of the 26,060 interned over the four years, roughly 4,000 died from starvation, execution, or exposure.	
Union	Fort Slocum	Davids Island, New York City	Davids Island was used from July 1863 to October 1863 as a temporary hospital for Confederate soldiers injured during the Battle of Gettysburg.	
Union	Elmira Prison	Elmira, New York	Originally established as Camp Rathbun, a training base, the site was converted to a prisoner of war camp in 1864 with a capacity for approximately 12,000 prisoners. Before its closure in 1865, 2,963 prisoners died there from various causes.	
Union	Fort Delaware	Delaware City, Delaware		
Union	Fort Warren	Boston, Massachusetts		
Union	Gratiot Street Prison	St. Louis, Missouri		
Union	Johnson's Island	Lake Erie, Sandusky, Ohio		
Union	Ohio Penitentiary	Columbus, Ohio		
Union	Old Capitol Prison	Washington, DC		
Union	Point Lookout	Saint Mary's County, Maryland		
Union	Rock Island Prison	Rock Island, Illinois	A U.S. Government owned island in the Mississippi River	
Union	Camp Morton	Indianapolis, Indiana		
Confederate	Andersonville	Andersonville, Georgia	13,000 of the 45,000 Union soldiers imprisoned here died, making Andersonville the deadliest prison in the Civil War. The site is now the National POW Museum.	
Confederate	Camp Lawton	Millen, Georgia	To relieve some of the conditions at Andersonville, a larger prison was constructed in the summer of 1864 near the Lawton Depot in the town of Millen, Georgia. Around 10,000 prisoners were moved to Camp Lawton between October and late November 1864. It is currently a state park, Magnolia Springs.	
Confederate	Belle Isle	Richmond, Virginia		
Confederate	Blackshear Prison	Blackshear, Georgia		
Confederate	Cahaba Prison (Castle Morgan)	Selma, Alabama		Castle Morgan, Cahaba, Alabama, 1863–65. Drawn from memory by Jesse Hawes
Confederate	Camp Ford	Near Tyler, Texas		Wood cut engraving of Camp Ford, Texas. Originally drawn by Jas. S. McClain, captured on May 3, 1864, and held prisoner until the final exchange on May 27, 1865.
Confederate	Castle Pinckney	Charleston, South Carolina		
Confederate	Castle Sorghum	Columbia, South Carolina		
Confederate	Castle Thunder	Richmond, Virginia		
Confederate	Danville Prison	Danville, Virginia	The Confederate prison at Danville, Va., was not one prison camp but six tobacco warehouses in which captured Union soldiers were confined during 1863–1865. Only Prison Number 6 remains on site at 300 Lynn Street	
Confederate	Florence Stockade	Florence, South Carolina		
Confederate	Fort Pulaski	Savannah, Georgia	Fort Pulaski was used as Confederate prison camp from 1861 to 1862.	
Confederate	Libby Prison	Richmond, Virginia		
Confederate	Salisbury Prison	Salisbury, North Carolina		

== See also ==
- Prisoner-of-war camp, worldwide history
- Henry Wirz, commander at Andersonville; executed for war crimes
- Parole camp

== Bibliography ==
=== General ===
- Burnham, Philip. So Far from Dixie: Confederates in Yankee Prisons (2003)
- Butts, Michele Tucker. Galvanized Yankees on the Upper Missouri: The Face of Loyalty (2003); Confederate POWs who joined the US Army
- Current, Richard N. et al., eds. Encyclopedia of the Confederacy (1993); reprinted in The Confederacy: Macmillan Information Now Encyclopedia (1998), articles on "Prisoners of War" and "Prisons"
- Gillispie, James M. Andersonvilles of the North: The Myths and Realities of Northern Treatment of Civil War Confederate Prisoners (2012) excerpt and text search
- Gray, Michael P., ed. Crossing the Deadlines: Civil War Prisons Reconsidered (2018) online review
- Hesseltine, William B. (1930). Civil War Prisons: A Study in War Psychology. Ohio State University Press.
- Hesseltine, William B. (1935). "The Propaganda Literature of Confederate Prisons," Journal of Southern History 1#1 pp. 56–66 in JSTOR
- Joslyn, Mauriel P. (1996). Captives Immortal: The Story of Six Hundred Confederate Officers and the United States Prisoner of War Policy. White Mane Publishing.
- Kellogg, Robert H. (1865). Life and Death in Rebel Prisons: Giving a Complete History of the Inhumane and Barbarous Treatment of Our Brave Soldiers by Rebel Authorities, Inflicting Terrible Suffering and Frightful Mortality, Principally at Andersonville, Ga., and Florence, S.C., Describing Plans of Escape, Arrival of Prisoners, with Numerous and Varied Incidents and Anecdotes of Prison Life. Hartford, CT: L. Stebbins.
- Pickenpaugh, Roger (2013). Captives in Blue: The Civil War Prisons of the Confederacy excerpt and text search
- Pickenpaugh, Roger (2009). Captives in Gray: The Civil War Prisons of the Union.
- Rhodes, James Ford (1904). History of the United States from the Compromise of 1850. Harper & Brothers. pp. 483–508, vol. 4 ch. 29. for an impartial account. another copy online
- Robins, Glenn. "Race, Repatriation, and Galvanized Rebels: Union Prisoners and the Exchange Question in Deep South Prison Camps," Civil War History (2007) 53#2 pp. 117–140 in Project MUSE.
- Sanders, Charles W., Jr. (2005). While in the Hands of the Enemy: Military Prisons of the Civil War. Louisiana State University Press.
- Silkenat, David (2019). Raising the White Flag: How Surrender Defined the American Civil War. Chapel Hill: University of North Carolina Press. ISBN 978-1-4696-4972-6.
- Speer, Lonnie R. (1997). Portals to Hell: Military Prisons of the Civil War.
- Speer, Lonnie R. (2002). War of Vengeance: Acts of Retaliation Against Civil War POWs. Stackpole Books.
- Stokes, Karen (2013). The Immortal 600: Surviving Civil War Charleston and Savannah. The History Press.

=== Specific camps ===
- Arnold-Scriber, Theresa and Scriber, Terry G. (2012). Ship Island, Mississippi: Rosters and History of the Civil War Prison. McFarland excerpt and text search
- Byrne, Frank L., "Libby Prison: A Study in Emotions," Journal of Southern History (1958) 24(4): 430–444. in JSTOR
- Casstevens, Frances (2004). George W. Alexander and Castle Thunder: A Confederate Prison and Its Commandant. McFarland.
- Davis, Robert Scott (2006). Ghosts and Shadows of Andersonville: Essays on the Secret Social Histories of America's Deadliest Prison. Mercer University Press.
- Fetzer Jr., Dale and Bruce E. Mowdey (2002). Unlikely Allies: Fort Delaware's Prison Community in the Civil War. Stackpole Books.
- Genoways, Ted and Genoways, Hugh H. (eds.) (2001). A Perfect Picture of Hell: Eyewitness Accounts by Civil War Prisoners from the 12th Iowa. University of Iowa Press.
- Gray, Michael P. (2001). The Business of Captivity in the Chemung Valley: Elmira and Its Civil War Prison (2001)
- Hesseltine William B., ed. (1972). Civil War Prisons. reprints among other articles:
  - Futch, Ovid (1962). "Prison Life at Andersonville," Civil War History 8#2 pp. 121–135
  - McLain, Minor H. (1962) "The Military Prison at Fort Warren," Civil War History. 8#2 pp. 135–151.
  - Robertson, James I., Jr. (1962). "The Scourge of Elmira," Civil War History. 8#2 pp. 184–201.
  - Walker, T. R. (1962). "Rock Island Prison Barracks," Civil War History. 8#2 pp. 152–163.
- Hesseltine, William B. (1956). "Andersonville Revisited," The Georgia Review. 10#1 pp. 92–101 in JSTOR
- Horigan, Michael (2002). Elmira: Death Camp of the North. Stackpole Books.
- Levy, George (1999). To Die in Chicago: Confederate Prisoners at Camp Douglas, 1862–65. (2nd ed.) excerpt and text search.
- Marvel, William (1994). Andersonville: The Last Depot. University of North Carolina Press.
- McAdams, Benton (2000). Rebels at Rock Island: The Story of a Civil War Prison.
- Potter, Clifton W., Jr. (2024). Yankees in the Hill City: The Union Prisoner of War Camp in Lynchburg, Virginia, 1862–1865. McFarland.
- Richardson, Rufus B. "Andersonville," New Englander and Yale Review (November 1880) 39# 157 pp. 729–774 online
- Triebe, Richard H. (2011). Fort Fisher to Elmira: The Fateful Journey of 518 Confederate Soldiers. CreateSpace.
- Waggoner, Jesse. "The Role of the Physician: Eugene Sanger and a Standard of Care at the Elmira Prison Camp," Journal of the History of Medicine & Allied Sciences (2008) 63#1 pp 1–22; Sanger reportedly boasted of killing enemy soldiers.
- Wheelan, Joseph (2010). Libby Prison Breakout: The Daring Escape from the Notorious Civil War Prison. New York: Public Affairs.

=== Historiography ===
- Chesson, Michael B. (1996). "Prison Camps and Prisoners of War," in Steven E. Woodworth, ed., The American Civil War. pp. 466–78; review of published studies.
- Cloyd, Benjamin G. (2010). Haunted by Atrocity: Civil War Prisons in American Memory. (Louisiana State University Press. Traces shifts in Americans' views of the brutal treatment of soldiers in both Confederate and Union prisons, from raw memories in the decades after the war to a position that deflected responsibility. excerpt and text search
  - Robins, Glenn. "Andersonville in History and Memory," Georgia Historical Quarterly (2011) 95#3, pp. 408–422; review of Cloyd (2010)
- Schmutz, John F. (2024). The 'Immortal Six Hundred' and the Failure of the Civil War POW Exchange Process. (McFarland)

=== Fiction ===
- Kantor, MacKinlay (1956). Andersonville. A novel that won the Pulitzer Prize for fiction

=== Primary sources ===
- reports from Harper's Weekly 1863–64; illustrated
- Civil War Research Database search for individual soldiers
- Chandler's 1864 Confederate report; the single most important original document. From Official Records series. ii. vol. vii. pp. 546–551
- Extracts from the Minutes of Proceedings of the Standing Committee of the United States Sanitary Commission...1864 , with hair-raising details
- Appendix to the Report of the Sanitary Commission (1864) much more detail
- Trial of Captain Henry Wirz with documents
- Ransom, John. Andersonville (original edition 1881; reprinted as Andersonville Diary); first person account that greatly exaggerated conditions; historians consider it untrustworthy as a primary source.]
- Robert H. Kellogg, Life and Death in Rebel Prisons (1866)
- prison letters from Massachusetts men who died in prison
