= Salisbury National Cemetery =

Historic cemetery in Rowan County, North Carolina

- U.S. National Register of Historic Places
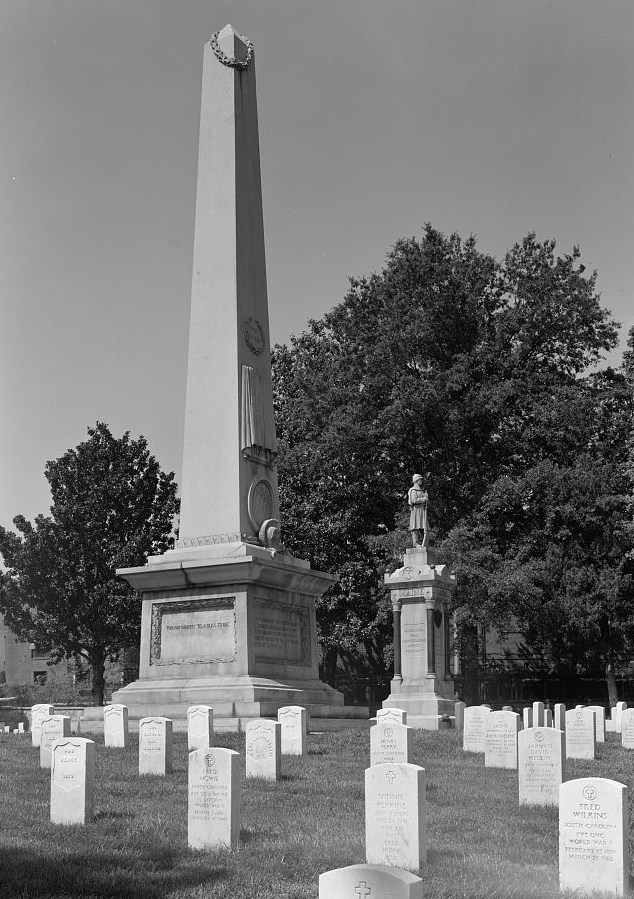
- Unknown Dead Monument with the Maine Monument in the background.

- Location within North Carolina Location within the United States
- Location: 202 Government Rd., Salisbury, North Carolina
- Coordinates: 35°39′40″N 80°28′26″W
- Built: 1863
- Architectural style: Dutch Colonial Revival
- MPS: Civil War Era National Cemeteries MPS
- NRHP reference No.: 99000393
- Added to NRHP: April 12, 1999

Salisbury National Cemetery is a United States National Cemetery located in the city of Salisbury, in Rowan County, North Carolina. It was established at the site of burials of Union soldiers who died during the American Civil War while held at a Confederate prisoner of war camp at the site.

Now administered by the United States Department of Veterans Affairs, it encompasses 65 acres (26 ha), 15 acres (6.1 ha) in the original location and 50 acres (20 ha) at an annex. More than 30 acres were added to the annex in 2020 as a result of a donation by the YMCA.

As of 2012 the cemetery had 6500 interments (in 6000 standard graves, many of which also hold a spouse), plus an estimated 3,800 in 18 mass graves at the original location. There are 5000 interments, in 4500 graves, in the new location. As of 2020 a total of 26,000 veterans and family members were buried in both locations.

== History ==
=== Salisbury Prison ===
Salisbury Prison
- Part of American Civil War prison camps
- Salisbury, in Rowan County, North Carolina, US
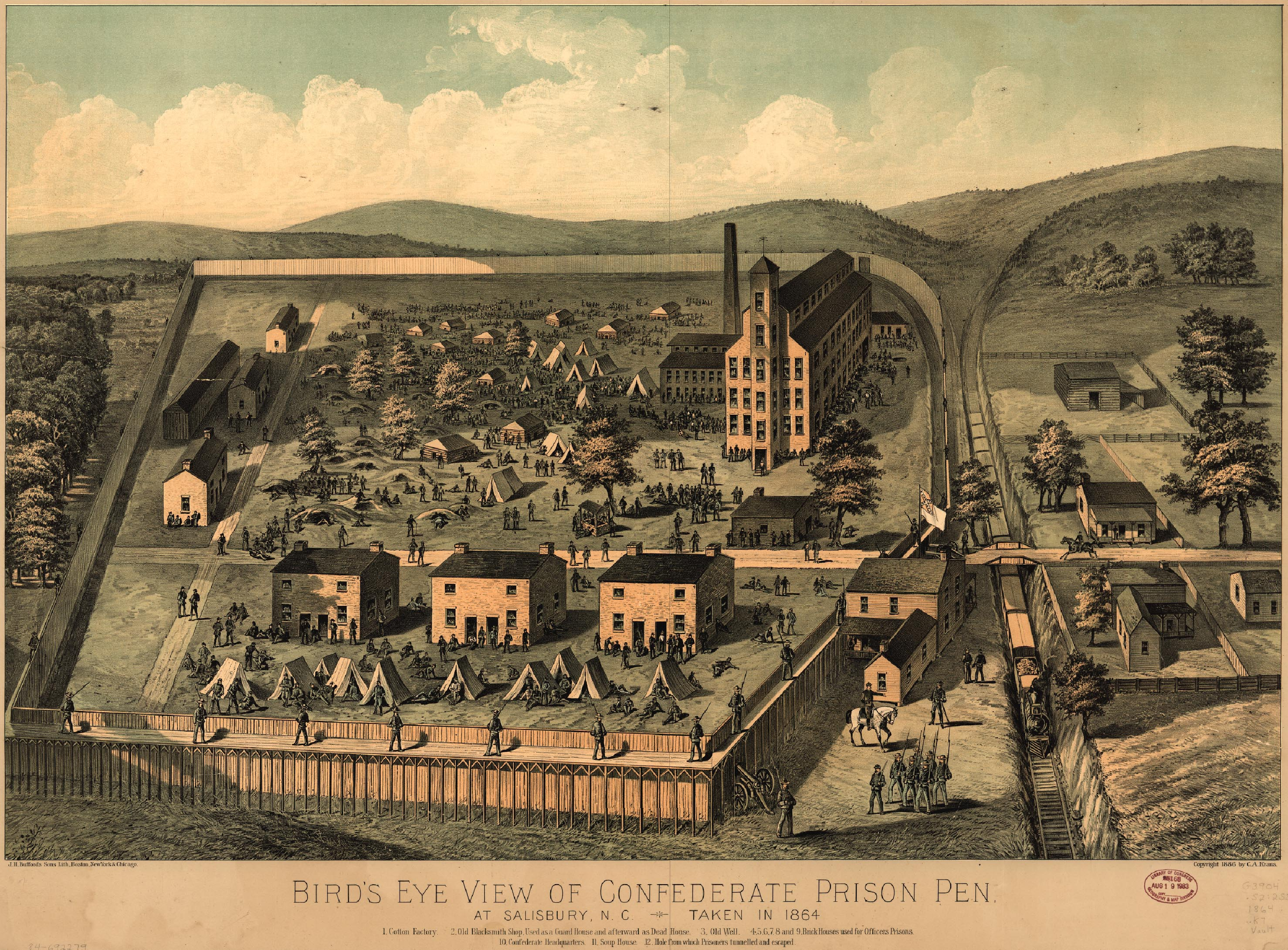
- Salisbury Prison in 1864

Site information
- Type: Confederate Prison Camp
- Owner: Confederate States Government
- Controlled by: Confederate Army
- Open to the public: Yes

Site history
- In use: September May 1861 – February 1865
- Demolished: 1865
- Battles/wars: American Civil War

Garrison information
- Occupants: Confederate soldiers, Union prisoners of war

In May 1861, North Carolina seceded from the Union and the Confederacy sought a site in Rowan County for a military prison. A twenty-year-old abandoned cotton mill near the railroad line was selected as the location. Owned by Salisbury Manufacturing, then by Maxwell Chambers from 1848 until his death in 1855, the mill had stopped operating around 1860.

It was sold to the Confederacy by Davidson College. The structure was brick and three stories tall, with an attic. Cottages and a stockade were later added as part of the complex. The number of prisoners increased from 120 in December 1861 to 1,400 in May 1862. In the early part of the war, prisoners were well cared for and allowed to play baseball. This was recorded in a drawing by Maj. Otto Boetticher, which is believed to be one of the first art works showing the game being played.

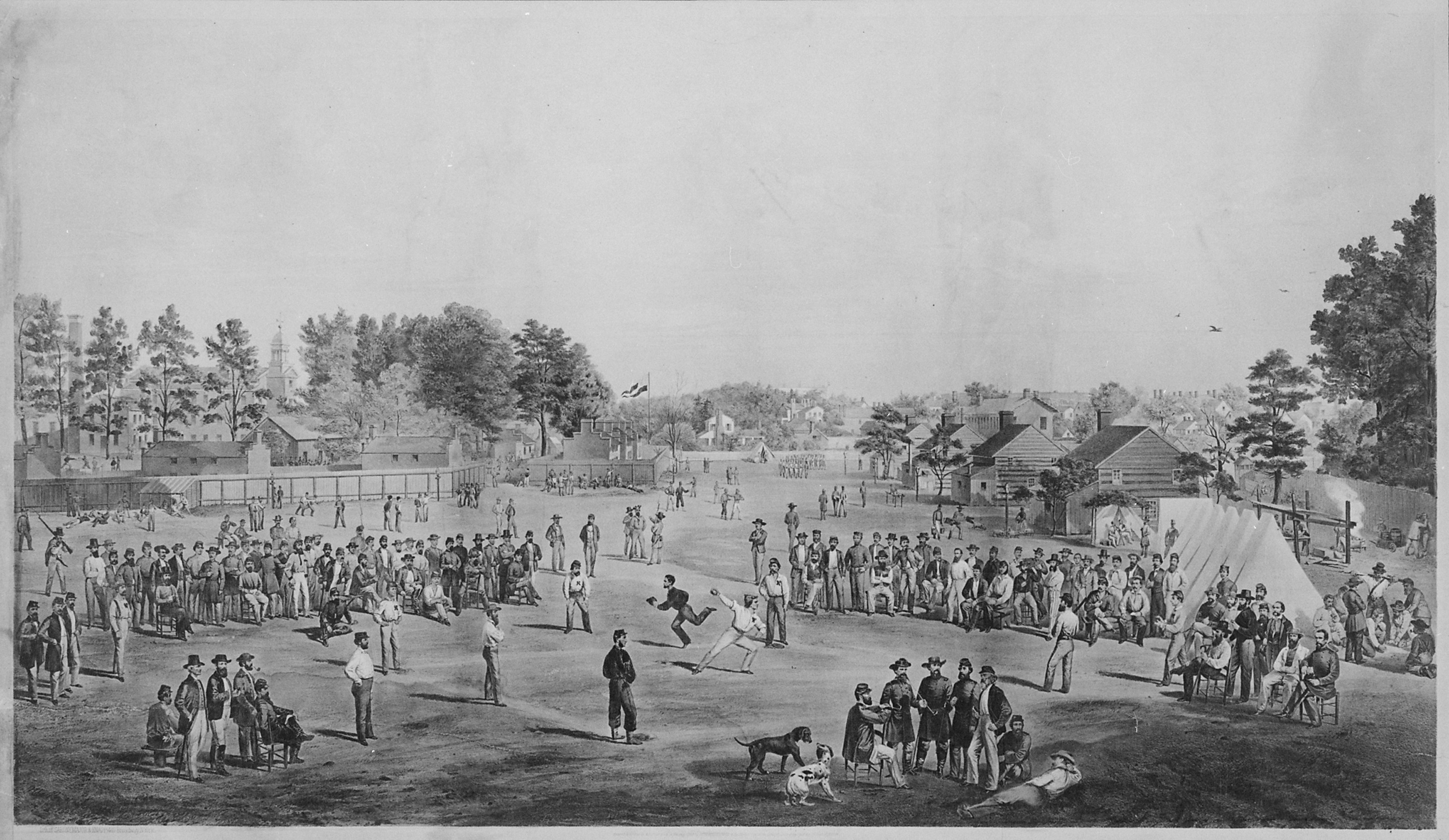
Drawing of baseball game between Union prisoners at Salisbury Prison by Otto Boetticher

By October 1864 the prison held 5,000 men, soon increasing to 10,000. The town of Salisbury had 2,000 residents, and at that was the fourth largest town in the state. Residents felt threatened by the high number of prisoners being held, and associated diseases. As the prison became overcrowded, the death rate increased from 2 to 28 percent because of malnutrition, poor sanitation, and disease. The Confederates used mass graves to bury the many dead.

Because of the poor conditions and high mortality, in February 1865 the Confederates moved thousands of prisoners to other locations, including 3,729 who were marched to Greensboro and taken from there by train to Wilmington, North Carolina, and 1,420 others who were transferred to facilities in Richmond, Virginia. By the time Union Gen. George Stoneman reached Salisbury in the spring of 1865, the prison had been emptied and was being used as a supply depot. Stoneman ordered the prison structures burned and a wood fence built around the mass graves. Of the buildings that constituted the prison, one house on Bank Street still stands; it was believed to be a guardhouse.

Archeological excavations of the site took place in 1983 and 2005. Additional studies were made with new technology. On August 29, 2017, archaeologist Ari D. Lukas announced that ground-penetrating radar had located a former barracks on a vacant lot on Bank Street, which used to be part of the cotton mill/prison complex. Excavation of that site took place in November 2018.

In a March 28, 2019 presentation, Timothy Roberts, an investigator with Cultural Resources Analysts, reported the findings. Brick, mortar and stone showed the portico of the barracks was likely located on the lot. Building materials had been salvaged and probably used in other buildings after the war, according to Steve Cobb of Historic Salisbury Foundation. The artifacts found did not necessarily come from the prison. It was possible that other excavations could reveal the boundaries of the building.

=== Cemetery ===
Initially the Confederates buried prisoners of war who died while held at Salisbury Prison, near the complex. A report by Confederate General T.W. Hall stated that 10,321 prisoners arrived between October 5, 1864 and February 17, 1865. 2,918 reportedly died at the hospital, and a total of 3,479 were buried. Many of the dead were buried in eighteen 240-foot-long (73 m) trench graves without coffins in a former corn field, so it is unknown exactly how many prisoners were buried there. 11,700 has been the generally accepted number and is inscribed on the 1875 monument to the unknown soldier erected at the site. Since the late 20th century, research has shown that the number of interments in the mass graves is instead close to 3800.

The fence which Stoneman had built around the mass graves was later replaced with a stone wall. After the American Civil War, the cemetery was officially designated as a National Cemetery for Union burials. Remains of Union troops from other cemeteries around the area were transferred to it. Later the national cemeteries accepted dead veterans from all wars.

== 20th century to present ==
Salisbury National Cemetery was listed on the National Register of Historic Places in 1999.

By 1994 projections were that the national cemetery would be filled by 1997. No burials other than spouses of persons already there were permitted. Additions had been made in 1976, 1985 and 1995, which gave the cemetery a total of 12.5 acres, and 5800 were buried at the cemetery already. Administrators predicted that by the end of 1999, the cemetery would have no more room. Representatives of the cemetery, veterans, and Rowan County traveled to Washington, D.C. asking for help.

On Memorial Day 1999, the Veterans Administration announced the donation of about 40 acres (16 ha) for cemetery purposes, at the W.G. (Bill) Hefner VA Medical Center in Salisbury. The land included the Brookdale Golf Course, donated by Samuel C. Hart American Legion Post to be used by the hospital when it opened in 1953. It was operated as a golf course until the late 1980s.

This expansion provided space for the cemetery to serve veterans for 50 to 75 years, with room for 20,000 more veterans and family members. A groundbreaking ceremony was held at the cemetery annex on Pearl Harbor Day 1999. The first burial in the new location took place in March 2000.

In April 2000, 4.7 acres (1.9 ha) became part of the Salisbury National Cemetery. Two years later, a $2.8 million expansion began on 31 acres (13 ha) of the former golf course, with space to bury 12,000 more people.

On November 14, 2011, work began on a new columbarium with a capacity of 1000, which was expected to last ten years. The existing columbarium was nearly filled. Also, the cemetery was adding 2400 "pre-placed in-ground crypts"; these allowed 1500 burials per acre compared to 700 with normal graves.

As of Memorial Day 2012, the original cemetery, with about 7000 markers, was closed to new burials, except for spouses of those already buried. The annex had 4000 markers and was the state's only open national cemetery.

In January 2020, a donation by the Rowan County YMCA of more than 30 acres to the annex provided for the annex to continue burials until 2065.

== Number buried in trenches ==
In 1869, Brevet Gen. L. Thomas estimated the number buried at 11,700, after two of the trenches were opened. That number is used on the monument to unknown soldiers. But research by Louis A. Brown shows the number to be close to 3800.

Mark Hughes of Kings Mountain, North Carolina has campaigned to get the number corrected on the monument, and also to add grave markers for the 3500 men whose identities can be determined from sources such as an 1868 Roll of Honor. He cites federal law requiring a marker for anyone buried in a national cemetery. As of 2014, the United States Department of Veterans Affairs does not plan to change the monument or add individual markers. It is not possible to determine precisely who was buried. In 2009, an interpretive panel was added to show what research has determined about the number of mass burials. In 2014, the 1868 Roll of Honor was being added to a web site.

== Notable monuments ==
- The Federal Monument to the Unknown Dead, a 38-foot-tall (12 m) granite obelisk erected in 1875 at a cost of $10,000.
- A 25-foot-high (7.6 m) granite monument topped by a statue of a soldier, erected in 1908 by the state of Maine.
- The Pennsylvania Monument, a 40-foot-high (12 m) monument on a granite base, erected in 1909.

== Notable interments ==
- Red Prysock (1926–1993), veteran and R&B tenor saxophonist
- Earl B. Ruth (1916–1989), U.S. Representative and Governor of American Samoa
- John William Smith (1927–2002), figure in the 1967 Newark, N.J. riots (Annex)
- Pvt. "Rupert Vincent", Company H, 3rd New Hampshire Volunteer Infantry. In reality, Pvt. Vincent was named Robert A. Livingstone and was the eldest son of Dr. David Livingstone, famous Scottish missionary and explorer in Africa.

== See also ==
- Elmira Prison
- Point Lookout State Park
- Andersonville Prison
- Florence Stockade
- Libby Prison
