= Camp Chase =

Military camp in Columbus, Ohio, US

- Part of American Civil War prison camps
- Columbus, Ohio, United States
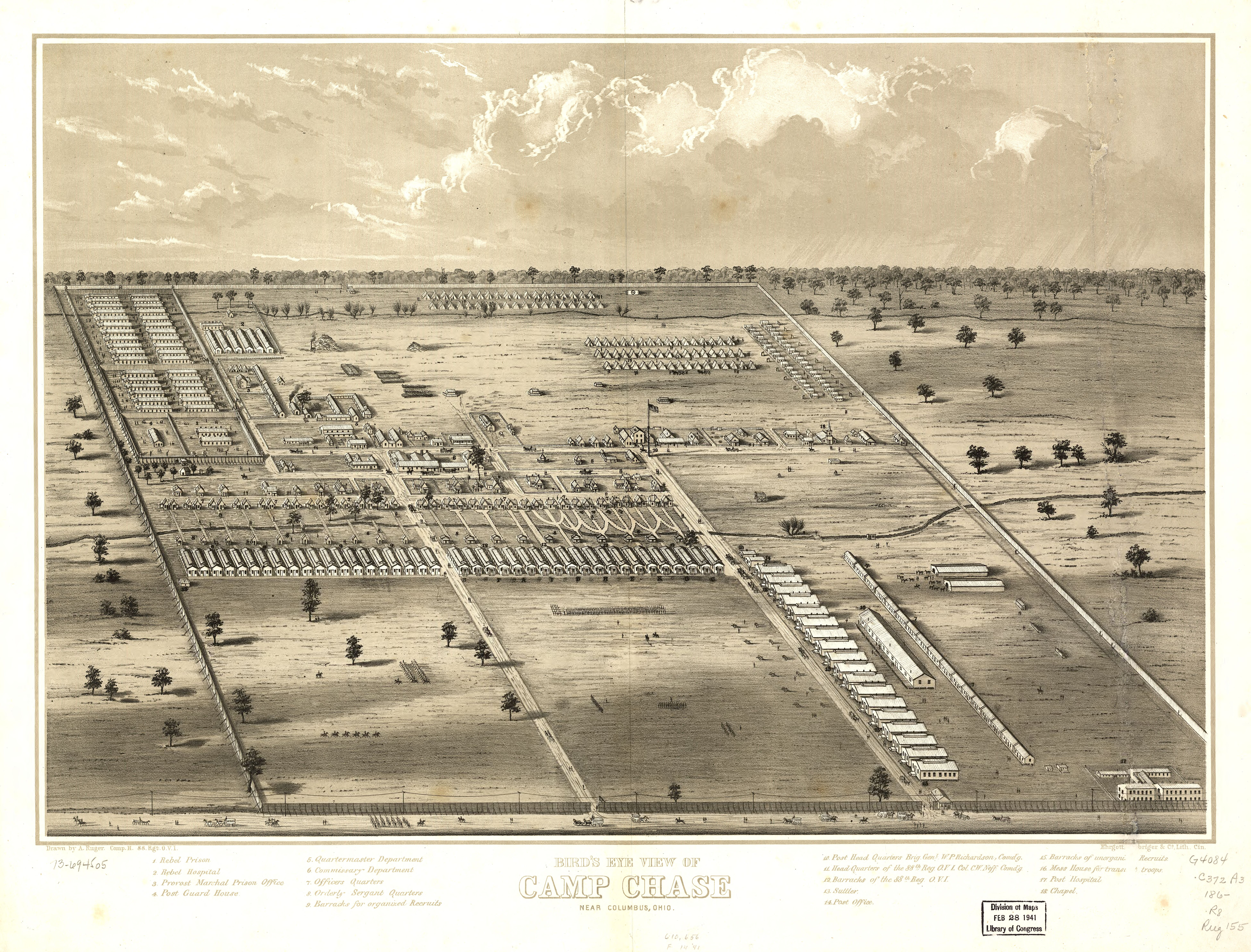

Site information
- Type: Army Training Camp and Union Prison Camp
- Owner: U.S. Government
- Controlled by: Union Army
- Open to the public: Yes

Site history
- In use: 1861–1865
- Demolished: 1865–1867
- Battles/wars: American Civil War

Garrison information
- Occupants: Union soldiers, Confederate officer prisoners of war
- Camp Chase Site
- U.S. National Register of Historic Places
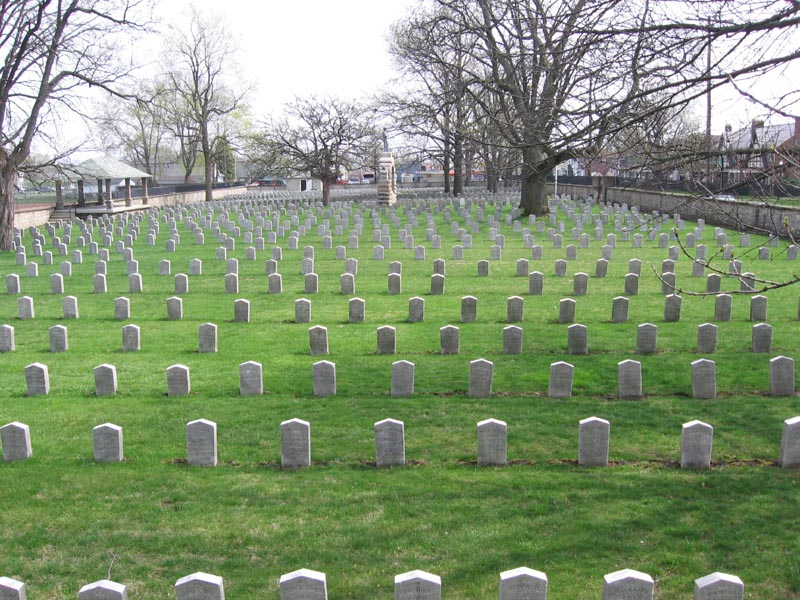
- More than 2,200 Confederate graves are in the Camp Chase Confederate Cemetery
- Interactive map
- Location: 2900 Sullivant Ave., Columbus, Ohio
- Coordinates: 39°56′38″N 83°4′33″W
- Area: 1.4 acres (0.57 ha)
- Built: 1861
- NRHP reference No.: 73001434
- Added to NRHP: April 11, 1973

Camp Chase was a military staging and training camp established in Columbus, Ohio, United States, in May 1861 after the start of the American Civil War. It also included a large Union-operated prison camp for Confederate prisoners during the American Civil War.

The camp was closed and dismantled after the war and the site has been redeveloped for residential and commercial use, except for the Camp Chase Confederate Cemetery, which contains 2,260 graves of Confederates who died in captivity both in Camp Chase and in Camp Dennison near Cincinnati. Camp Chase was located in what is now the Hilltop neighborhood of Columbus, Ohio. Camp Chase is listed on the National Register of Historic Places.

== History ==
Camp Chase was an American Civil War training and prison camp established in May 1861, on land leased by the U.S. Government. It replaced the much smaller Camp Jackson which was established by Ohio Governor William Dennison Jr as a place for Ohio's union volunteers to meet. It originally operated from a city park. The main entrance was on the National Road 4 miles (6.4 km) west of Downtown Columbus, Ohio. Boundaries of the camp were present-day Broad Street (north), Hague Avenue (east), Sullivant Avenue (south), and near Westgate Avenue (west). Named for former Ohio Governor, Salmon P. Chase, who was Lincoln's Secretary of the Treasury; it was a training camp for Ohio volunteer army soldiers, a parole camp, a muster outpost, and later a prisoner-of-war camp. The nearby Camp Thomas served as a similar base for the Regular Army. As many as 150,000 Union soldiers and 25,000 Confederate prisoners passed through its gates from 1861 to 1865. By February 1865, over 9,400 men were held at the prison. More than 2,200 Confederates are buried in the Camp Chase Cemetery. Western Virginia and Kentucky civilians suspected of actively supporting secession, including former three-term United States Congressman Richard Henry Stanton were held at the facility. The prison camp also held Confederates captured during Morgan's Raid in 1863, including Col. Basil W. Duke.

The camp was closed in 1865, and by September 1867, dismantled buildings, usable items, and 450 patients from Tripler Military Hospital (also in Columbus) were transferred to the new National Asylum for Disabled Volunteer Soldiers in Dayton, Ohio (now Dayton, Virginia). Building materials taken from dismantled buildings were sent to help build the Dayton facility which opened in 1867 and became the largest veterans home in the nation. In 1895, former Union soldier William H. Knauss organized the first memorial service at the cemetery. In 1906 he published a history of the camp.

The Confederate Soldier Memorial was dedicated in 1902. From 1912 to 1994, the United Daughters of the Confederacy held annual services to commemorate Confederate soldiers who had been held and died there. The Hilltop Historical Society now sponsors the event on the second Sunday in June.

== Prison conditions ==
The living conditions at Camp Chase were inadequate for a number of reasons. The prisoners were never intentionally starved, but because the Union army focused on feeding its own soldiers first it often left the prisoners with little to no food. The largest number of soldiers and officers held at Camp Chase at a single time was in 1863 when the prison camp held around 8,000 men. Because of the large number of prisoners crowded in a relatively small area, there was also a large outbreak of smallpox and other deadly diseases. This resulted in the death of hundreds of prisoners in the winter of 1863–1864. Many POW camps had the same conditions on both sides of the war. Because of this, the Union and the CSA agreed to exchange prisoners to stop the suffering of men on both sides. Ultimately around 10,000 soldiers were exchanged between both sides.

== Lady in Gray ==
The Lady in Gray is purportedly an apparition that haunts Camp Chase Cemetery. The story goes that the ghost is looking for her lost love, and cannot find him in the cemetery. The woman is described as young, in her late teens or early twenties, dressed entirely in gray, and carrying a clean white handkerchief. The legend of the Lady in Gray dates back to just after the Civil War, when visitors to Camp Chase spotted the woman walking through the cemetery, trying to read the carved names on the marked grave markers. She was seen quite often for several years, before disappearing completely.

== Camp Chase today ==
Aside from the two-acre Camp Chase Confederate Cemetery, the land that formerly housed Camp Chase has been redeveloped as a residential and commercial area known as Westgate. A corner stone to the camp is located in front of the Westgate #623 Masonic Temple, in a community in the Hilltop section of west Columbus. This development was built in the late 1920s and early 1930s. Camp Chase is listed on the National Register of Historic Places. Camp Chase Confederate Cemetery is managed along with five National Cemeteries by the Dayton National Cemetery.

== Vandalism ==
On August 22, 2017, part of a chain of removal of Confederate monuments and memorials, the statue of a Confederate soldier on top of the camp memorial was pushed off the arch and in the process had its head broken off. The vandals were never found. They stole the head of the Confederate statue but not the hat. The statue has been repaired under the auspices of the Dayton National Cemetery and was re-installed in May 2019.

== Photos ==
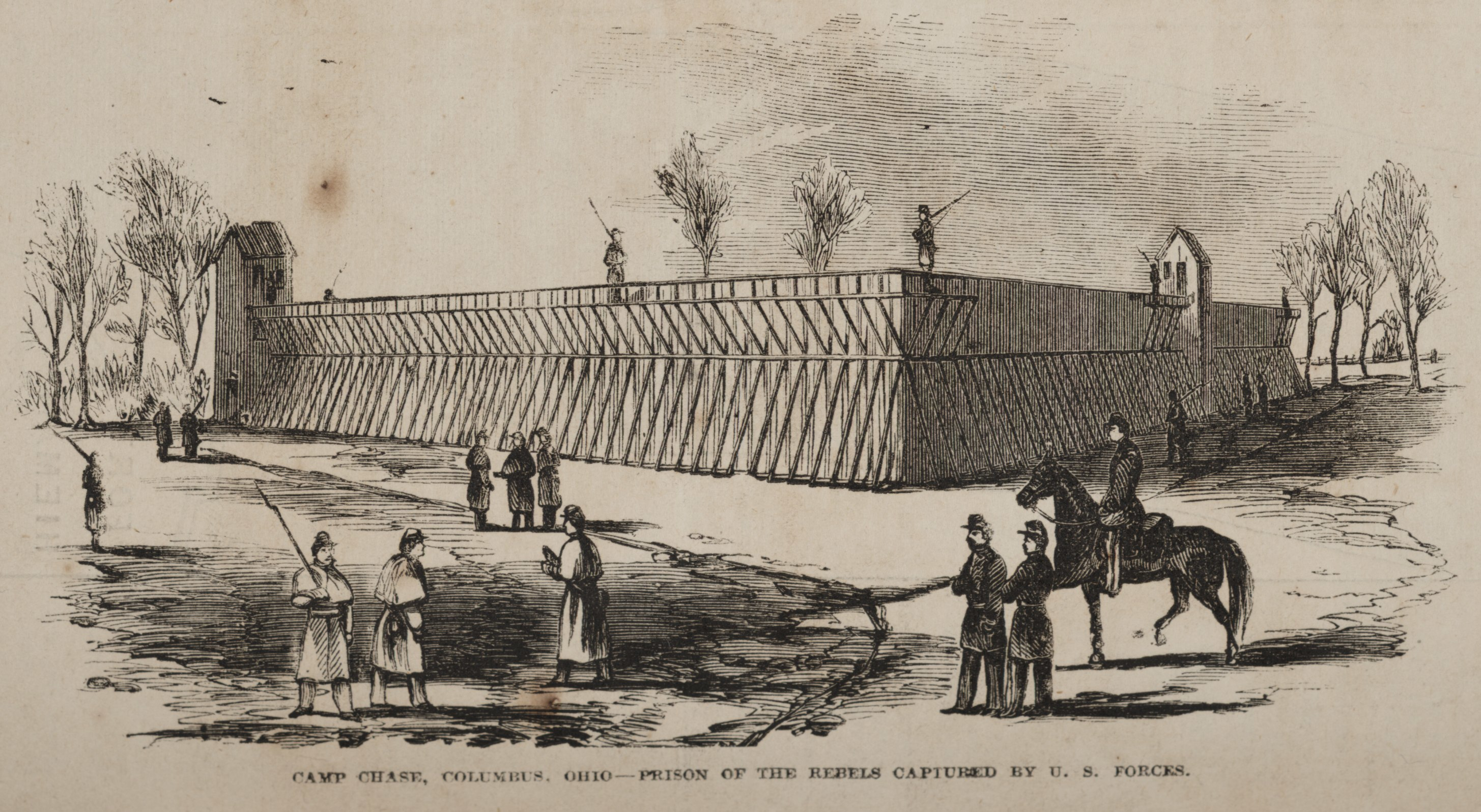
Camp Chase

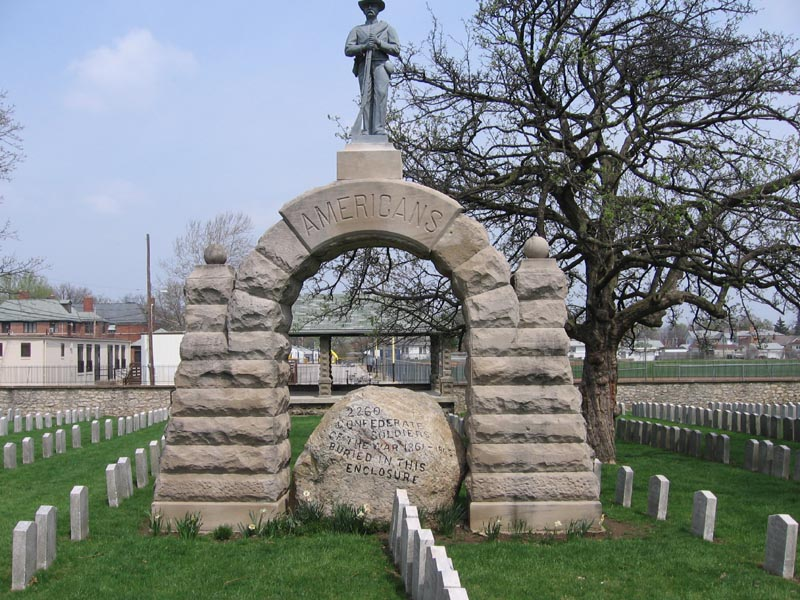
The Confederate Soldier Memorial before vandals broke off the statue at the top in 2017

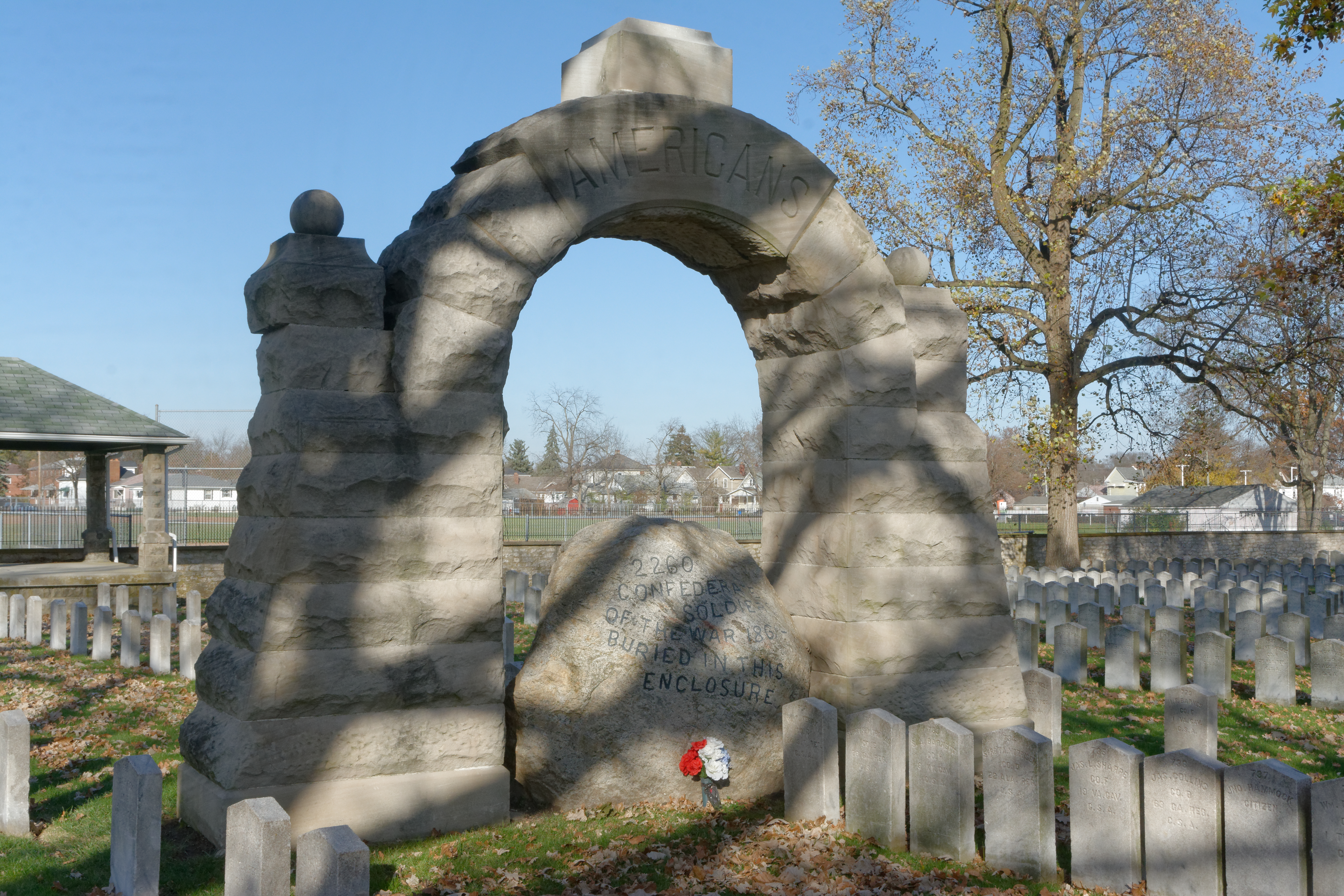
The memorial after vandals broke off the statue in 2017

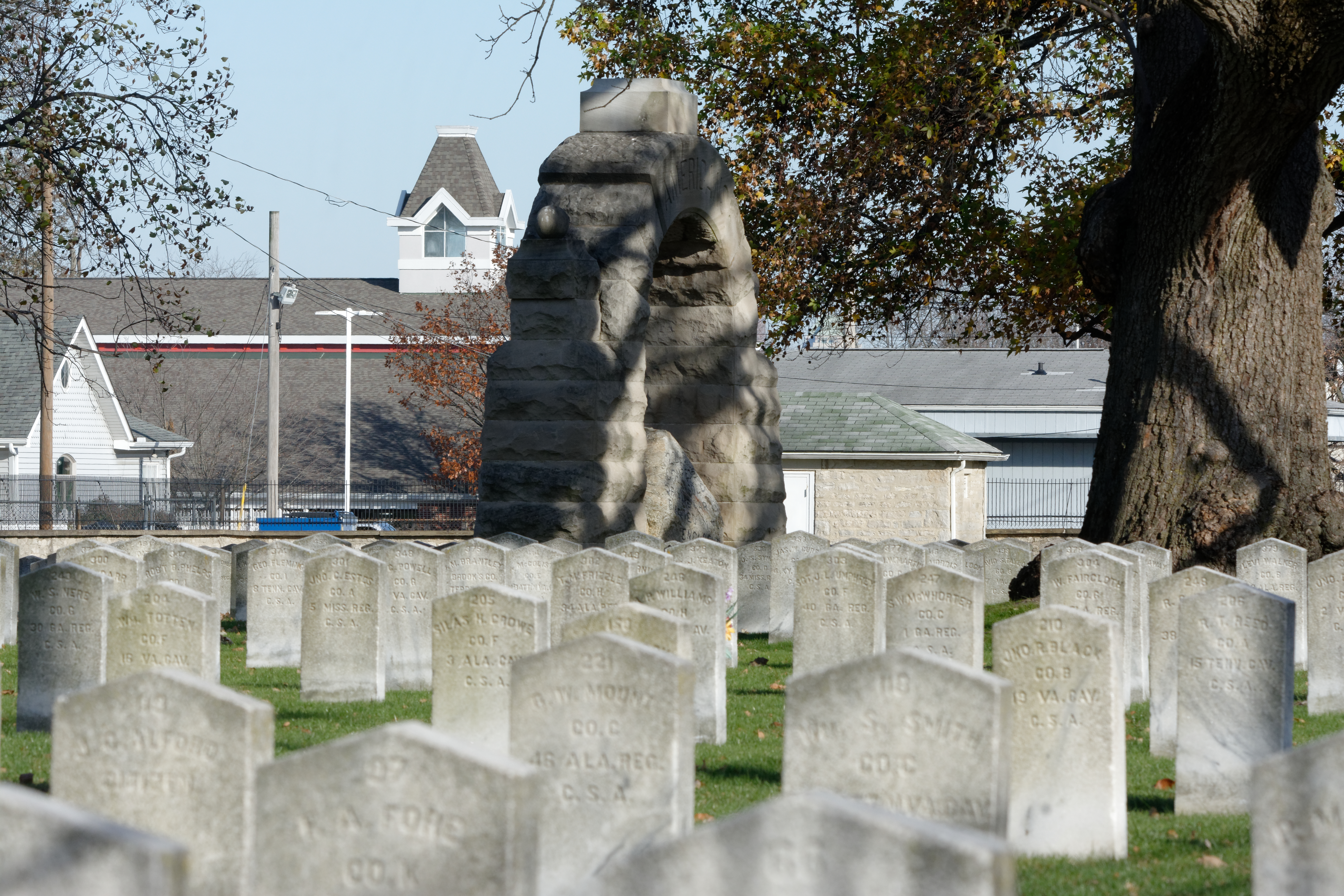
Gravestones and the main memorial

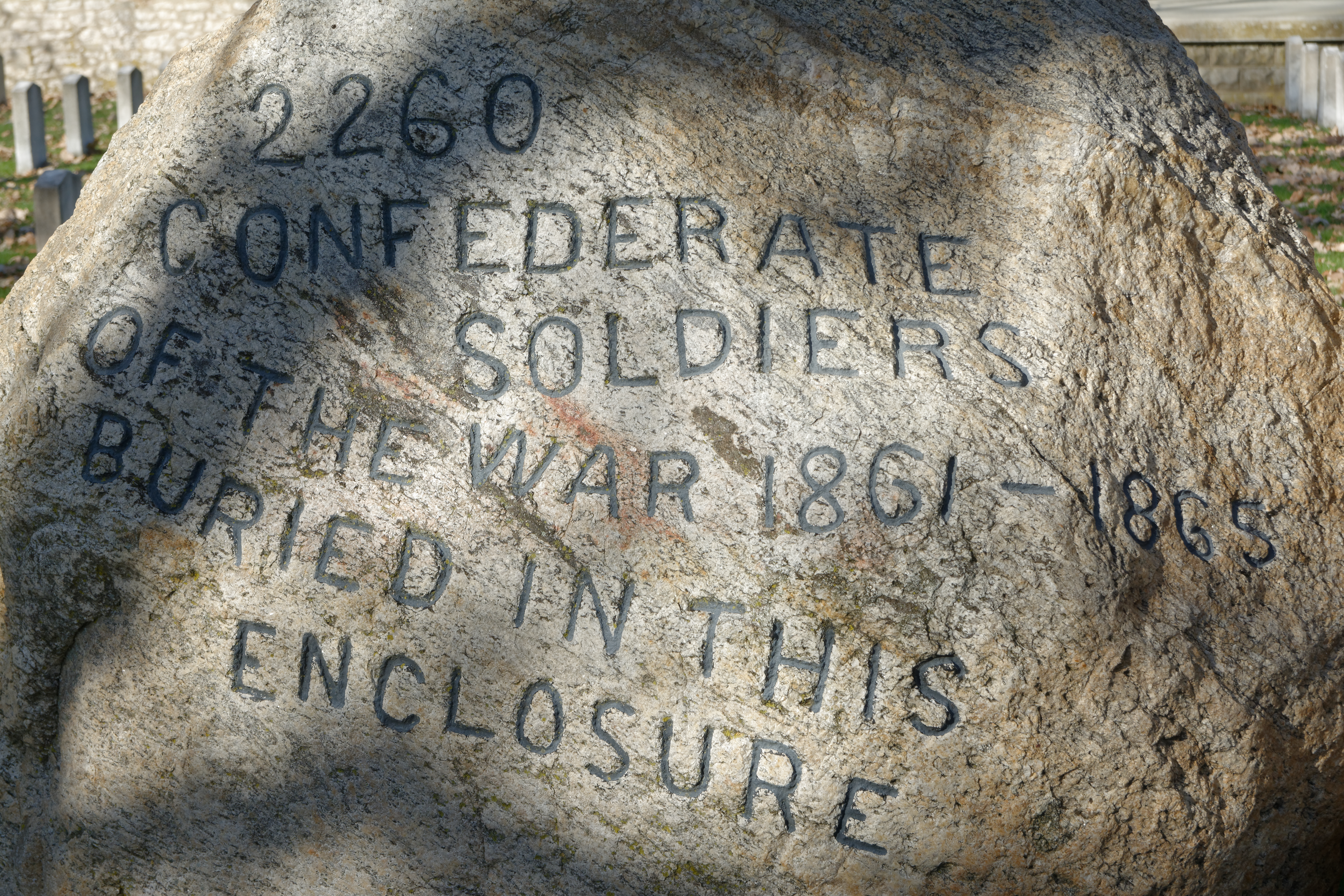
Text of the carved stone

== See also ==
- Camp Chase Railway
- Camp Chase Trail
- Camp Dennison
- Hilltop Area
- Johnson's Island
- Ohio in the Civil War
- List of Civil War POW prisons and camps
