= List of United States representatives in the 91st Congress =

This is a complete list of United States representatives during the 91st United States Congress listed by seniority.

As an historical article, the districts and party affiliations listed reflect those during the 91st Congress (January 3, 1969 – January 3, 1971). Seats and party affiliations on similar lists for other congresses will be different for certain members.

Seniority depends on the date on which members were sworn into office. Since many members are sworn in on the same day, subsequent ranking is based on previous congressional service of the individual and then by alphabetical order by the last name of the representative.

Committee chairmanship in the House is often associated with seniority. However, party leadership is typically not associated with seniority.

Note: The "*" indicates that the representative/delegate may have served one or more non-consecutive terms while in the House of Representatives of the United States Congress.

== U.S. House seniority list ==
U.S. House seniority
Rank	Representative	Party	District	Seniority date (Previous service, if any)	No.# of term(s)	Notes
1	Emanuel Celler	D	NY-10	March 4, 1923	24th term	Dean of the House
2	John William McCormack	D	MA-09	November 6, 1928	22nd term	Speaker of the House; Left the House in 1971.
3	Wright Patman	D	TX-01	March 4, 1929	21st term	
4	William M. Colmer	D	MS-05	March 4, 1933	19th term	
5	Leslie C. Arends	R	IL-17	January 3, 1935	18th term	
6	George H. Mahon	D	TX-19	January 3, 1935	18th term	
7	Michael J. Kirwan	D	OH-19	January 3, 1937	17th term	Died on July 27, 1970.
8	William R. Poage	D	TX-11	January 3, 1937	17th term	
9	John L. McMillan	D	SC-06	January 3, 1939	16th term	
10	Wilbur Mills	D	AR-02	January 3, 1939	16th term	
11	Felix Edward Hébert	D	LA-01	January 3, 1941	15th term	
12	L. Mendel Rivers	D	SC-01	January 3, 1941	15th term	Died on December 28, 1970.
13	Jamie Whitten	D	MS-02	November 4, 1941	15th term	
14	Thomas Abernethy	D	MS-01	January 3, 1943	14th term	
15	William L. Dawson	D	IL-01	January 3, 1943	14th term	Died on November 9, 1970.
16	Michael A. Feighan	D	OH-20	January 3, 1943	14th term	Left the House in 1971.
17	O. C. Fisher	D	TX-21	January 3, 1943	14th term	
18	Chester E. Holifield	D	CA-19	January 3, 1943	14th term	
19	Alvin O'Konski	R	WI-10	January 3, 1943	14th term	
20	Ray Madden	D	IN-01	January 3, 1943	14th term	
21	Philip J. Philbin	D	MA-03	January 3, 1943	14th term	Left the House in 1971.
22	George W. Andrews	D	AL-03	March 14, 1944	14th term	
23	John J. Rooney	D	NY-14	June 6, 1944	14th term	
24	John W. Byrnes	R	WI-08	January 3, 1945	13th term	
25	Robert J. Corbett	R	PA-18	January 3, 1945; Previous service, 1939–1941.	14th term*	
26	George Hyde Fallon	D	MD-04	January 3, 1945	13th term	Left the House in 1971.
27	James G. Fulton	R	PA-27	January 3, 1945	13th term	
28	George Paul Miller	D	CA-08	January 3, 1945	13th term	
29	Thomas E. Morgan	D	PA-26	January 3, 1945	13th term	
30	Charles Melvin Price	D	IL-24	January 3, 1945	13th term	
31	Adam Clayton Powell Jr.	D	NY-18	January 3, 1945	13th term	Left the House in 1971.
32	Robert L. F. Sikes	D	FL-01	January 3, 1945; Previous service, 1941–1944.	15th term*	
33	Olin E. Teague	D	TX-06	August 24, 1946	13th term	
34	Carl Albert	D	OK-03	January 3, 1947	12th term	
35	John Blatnik	D	MN-08	January 3, 1947	12th term	
36	Hale Boggs	D	LA-02	January 3, 1947; Previous service, 1941–1943.	13th term*	
37	Omar Burleson	D	TX-17	January 3, 1947	12th term	
38	Harold Donohue	D	MA-04	January 3, 1947	12th term	
39	Joe L. Evins	D	TN-04	January 3, 1947	12th term	
40	Otto Passman	D	LA-05	January 3, 1947	12th term	
41	Robert E. Jones Jr.	D	AL-08	January 28, 1947	12th term	
42	Edward Garmatz	D	MD-03	July 15, 1947	12th term	
43	William Moore McCulloch	R	OH-04	November 4, 1947	12th term	
44	Watkins Moorman Abbitt	D	VA-04	February 17, 1948	12th term	
45	Wayne N. Aspinall	D	CO-04	January 3, 1949	11th term	
46	William A. Barrett	D	PA-01	January 3, 1949; Previous service, 1945–1947.	12th term*	
47	Charles Edward Bennett	D	FL-03	January 3, 1949	11th term	
48	Richard Walker Bolling	D	MO-05	January 3, 1949	11th term	
49	James J. Delaney	D	NY-09	January 3, 1949; Previous service, 1945–1947.	12th term*	
50	Gerald Ford	R	MI-05	January 3, 1949	11th term	
51	H. R. Gross	R	IA-03	January 3, 1949	11th term	
52	Wayne Hays	D	OH-18	January 3, 1949	11th term	
53	Carl D. Perkins	D	KY-07	January 3, 1949	11th term	
54	Peter W. Rodino	D	NJ-10	January 3, 1949	11th term	
55	Harley Orrin Staggers	D	WV-02	January 3, 1949	11th term	
56	Tom Steed	D	OK-04	January 3, 1949	11th term	
57	Clement J. Zablocki	D	WI-04	January 3, 1949	11th term	
58	John P. Saylor	R	PA-22	September 13, 1949	11th term	
59	William B. Widnall	R	NJ-07	February 6, 1950	11th term	
60	William H. Bates	R	MA-06	February 14, 1950	11th term	Died on June 22, 1969.
61	E. Ross Adair	R	IN-04	January 3, 1951	10th term	Left the House in 1971.
62	William Hanes Ayres	R	OH-14	January 3, 1951	10th term	Left the House in 1971.
63	Page Belcher	R	OK-01	January 3, 1951	10th term	
64	Ellis Yarnal Berry	R	SD-02	January 3, 1951	10th term	Left the House in 1971.
65	Jackson Edward Betts	R	OH-08	January 3, 1951	10th term	
66	Frank T. Bow	R	OH-16	January 3, 1951	10th term	
67	William G. Bray	R	IN-06	January 3, 1951	10th term	
68	William Jennings Bryan Dorn	D	SC-03	January 3, 1951; Previous service, 1947–1949.	11th term*	
69	John Jarman	D	OK-05	January 3, 1951	10th term	
70	John C. Kluczynski	D	IL-05	January 3, 1951	10th term	
71	Byron G. Rogers	D	CO-01	January 3, 1951	10th term	Left the House in 1971.
72	William L. Springer	R	IL-22	January 3, 1951	10th term	
73	John C. Watts	D	KY-06	April 4, 1951	10th term	
74	John Dowdy	D	TX-02	September 23, 1952	10th term	
75	Edward Boland	D	MA-02	January 3, 1953	9th term	
76	Jack Brooks	D	TX-09	January 3, 1953	9th term	
77	Joel Broyhill	R	VA-10	January 3, 1953	9th term	
78	James A. Byrne	D	PA-03	January 3, 1953	9th term	
79	Elford Albin Cederberg	R	MI-10	January 3, 1953	9th term	
80	Ed Edmondson	D	OK-02	January 3, 1953	9th term	
81	Lawrence H. Fountain	D	NC-02	January 3, 1953	9th term	
82	Peter Frelinghuysen Jr.	R	NJ-05	January 3, 1953	9th term	
83	Samuel Friedel	D	MD-07	January 3, 1953	9th term	Left the House in 1971.
84	Charles S. Gubser	R	CA-10	January 3, 1953	9th term	
85	James A. Haley	D	FL-07	January 3, 1953	9th term	
86	Craig Hosmer	R	CA-32	January 3, 1953	9th term	
87	Charles R. Jonas	R	NC-09	January 3, 1953	9th term	
88	Melvin Laird	R	WI-07	January 3, 1953	9th term	Resigned on January 21, 1969.
89	Phillip M. Landrum	D	GA-09	January 3, 1953	9th term	
90	William S. Mailliard	R	CA-05	January 3, 1953	9th term	
91	John E. Moss	D	CA-03	January 3, 1953	9th term	
92	Tip O'Neill	D	MA-08	January 3, 1953	9th term	
93	Thomas Pelly	R	WA-01	January 3, 1953	9th term	
94	Richard Harding Poff	R	VA-06	January 3, 1953	9th term	
95	John J. Rhodes	R	AZ-01	January 3, 1953	9th term	
96	Leonor Sullivan	D	MO-03	January 3, 1953	9th term	
97	James B. Utt	R	CA-35	January 3, 1953	9th term	Died on March 1, 1970.
98	Bob Wilson	R	CA-36	January 3, 1953	9th term	
99	William Natcher	D	KY-02	August 1, 1953	9th term	
100	Glenard P. Lipscomb	R	CA-24	November 10, 1953	9th term	Died on February 1, 1970.
101	John James Flynt Jr.	D	GA-06	November 2, 1954	9th term	
102	Thomas W. L. Ashley	D	OH-09	January 3, 1955	8th term	
103	Frank M. Clark	D	PA-25	January 3, 1955	8th term	
104	William C. Cramer	R	FL-08	January 3, 1955	8th term	Left the House in 1971.
105	Charles Diggs	D	MI-13	January 3, 1955	8th term	
106	Dante Fascell	D	FL-12	January 3, 1955	8th term	
107	Daniel J. Flood	D	PA-11	January 3, 1955; Previous service, 1945–1947 and 1949–1953.	11th term**	
108	Kenneth J. Gray	D	IL-21	January 3, 1955	8th term	
109	Edith Green	D	OR-03	January 3, 1955	8th term	
110	Martha Griffiths	D	MI-17	January 3, 1955	8th term	
111	William Raleigh Hull Jr.	D	MO-06	January 3, 1955	8th term	
112	Torbert Macdonald	D	MA-07	January 3, 1955	8th term	
113	William Edwin Minshall Jr.	R	OH-23	January 3, 1955	8th term	
114	Henry S. Reuss	D	WI-05	January 3, 1955	8th term	
115	Bernice F. Sisk	D	CA-16	January 3, 1955	8th term	
116	Charles M. Teague	R	CA-13	January 3, 1955	8th term	
117	Frank Thompson	D	NJ-04	January 3, 1955	8th term	
118	Charles Vanik	D	OH-22	January 3, 1955	8th term	
119	Jim Wright	D	TX-12	January 3, 1955	8th term	
120	Paul Rogers	D	FL-09	January 11, 1955	8th term	
121	John Dingell	D	MI-16	December 13, 1955	8th term	
122	Walter S. Baring Jr.	D	NV	January 3, 1957; Previous service, 1949–1953.	9th term*	
123	William Broomfield	R	MI-18	January 3, 1957	7th term	
124	Charles E. Chamberlain	R	MI-06	January 3, 1957	7th term	
125	Harold R. Collier	R	IL-10	January 3, 1957	7th term	
126	Glenn Cunningham	R	NE-02	January 3, 1957	7th term	Left the House in 1971.
127	Florence P. Dwyer	R	NJ-12	January 3, 1957	7th term	
128	Leonard Farbstein	D	NY-19	January 3, 1957	7th term	Left the House in 1971.
129	Alton Lennon	D	NC-07	January 3, 1957	7th term	
130	John J. McFall	D	CA-15	January 3, 1957	7th term	
131	Robert Michel	R	IL-18	January 3, 1957	7th term	
132	H. Allen Smith	R	CA-20	January 3, 1957	7th term	
133	Al Ullman	D	OR-02	January 3, 1957	7th term	
134	John Andrew Young	D	TX-14	January 3, 1957	7th term	
135	Howard W. Robison	R	NY-33	January 14, 1958	7th term	
136	John Herman Dent	D	PA-21	January 21, 1958	7th term	
137	Fats Everett	D	TN-08	February 1, 1958	7th term	Died on January 26, 1969.
138	Al Quie	R	MN-01	February 18, 1958	7th term	
139	Robert N.C. Nix Sr.	D	PA-02	May 20, 1958	7th term	
140	John Brademas	D	IN-03	January 3, 1959	6th term	
141	James A. Burke	D	MA-11	January 3, 1959	6th term	
142	William T. Cahill	R	NJ-06	January 3, 1959	6th term	Resigned on January 19, 1970.
143	Robert R. Casey	D	TX-22	January 3, 1959	6th term	
144	Jeffery Cohelan	D	CA-07	January 3, 1959	6th term	Left the House in 1971.
145	Silvio O. Conte	R	MA-01	January 3, 1959	6th term	
146	Emilio Q. Daddario	D	CT-01	January 3, 1959	6th term	Left the House in 1971.
147	Dominick V. Daniels	D	NJ-14	January 3, 1959	6th term	
148	Ed Derwinski	R	IL-04	January 3, 1959	6th term	
149	Samuel L. Devine	R	OH-12	January 3, 1959	6th term	
150	Thomas N. Downing	D	VA-01	January 3, 1959	6th term	
151	Thaddeus J. Dulski	D	NY-41	January 3, 1959	6th term	
152	Cornelius Edward Gallagher	D	NJ-13	January 3, 1959	6th term	
153	Robert Giaimo	D	CT-03	January 3, 1959	6th term	
154	Harold T. Johnson	D	CA-02	January 3, 1959	6th term	
155	Seymour Halpern	R	NY-06	January 3, 1959	6th term	
156	Ken Hechler	D	WV-04	January 3, 1959	6th term	
157	Joseph Karth	D	MN-04	January 3, 1959	6th term	
158	Robert Kastenmeier	D	WI-02	January 3, 1959	6th term	
159	Hastings Keith	D	MA-12	January 3, 1959	6th term	
160	Odin Langen	R	MN-07	January 3, 1959	6th term	Left the House in 1971.
161	Del Latta	R	OH-05	January 3, 1959	6th term	
162	Catherine Dean May	R	WA-04	January 3, 1959	6th term	Left the House in 1971.
163	John S. Monagan	D	CT-05	January 3, 1959	6th term	
164	William S. Moorhead	D	PA-14	January 3, 1959	6th term	
165	William T. Murphy	D	IL-03	January 3, 1959	6th term	Left the House in 1971.
166	Ancher Nelsen	R	MN-02	January 3, 1959	6th term	
167	James G. O'Hara	D	MI-12	January 3, 1959	6th term	
168	Alexander Pirnie	R	NY-32	January 3, 1959	6th term	
169	Roman C. Pucinski	D	IL-11	January 3, 1959	6th term	
170	Dan Rostenkowski	D	IL-08	January 3, 1959	6th term	
171	John M. Slack Jr.	D	WV-03	January 3, 1959	6th term	
172	George E. Shipley	D	IL-23	January 3, 1959	6th term	
173	Neal Smith	D	IA-05	January 3, 1959	6th term	
174	Samuel S. Stratton	D	NY-35	January 3, 1959	6th term	
175	Frank Stubblefield	D	KY-01	January 3, 1959	6th term	
176	William J. Randall	D	MO-04	March 3, 1959	6th term	
177	Jacob H. Gilbert	D	NY-22	March 8, 1960	6th term	Left the House in 1971.
178	Herman T. Schneebeli	R	PA-17	April 26, 1960	6th term	
179	Roy A. Taylor	D	NC-11	June 25, 1960	6th term	
180	Julia Butler Hansen	D	WA-03	November 8, 1960	6th term	
181	J. Irving Whalley	R	PA-12	November 8, 1960	6th term	
182	Joseph Patrick Addabbo	D	NY-07	January 3, 1961	5th term	
183	John B. Anderson	R	IL-16	January 3, 1961	5th term	
184	John M. Ashbrook	R	OH-17	January 3, 1961	5th term	
185	James F. Battin	R	MT-02	January 3, 1961	5th term	Resigned on February 27, 1969.
186	Alphonzo E. Bell Jr.	R	CA-28	January 3, 1961	5th term	
187	Hugh Carey	D	NY-15	January 3, 1961	5th term	
188	Donald D. Clancy	R	OH-02	January 3, 1961	5th term	
189	James C. Corman	D	CA-22	January 3, 1961	5th term	
190	John W. Davis	D	GA-07	January 3, 1961	5th term	
191	Paul Findley	R	IL-20	January 3, 1961	5th term	
192	Fernand St. Germain	D	RI-01	January 3, 1961	5th term	
193	George Elliott Hagan	D	GA-01	January 3, 1961	5th term	
194	Durward Gorham Hall	R	MO-07	January 3, 1961	5th term	
195	Bill Harsha	R	OH-06	January 3, 1961	5th term	
196	R. James Harvey	R	MI-08	January 3, 1961	5th term	
197	David N. Henderson	D	NC-03	January 3, 1961	5th term	
198	Richard Howard Ichord Jr.	D	MO-08	January 3, 1961	5th term	
199	Charles Samuel Joelson	D	NJ-08	January 3, 1961	5th term	Resigned on September 4, 1969.
200	Carleton J. King	R	NY-30	January 3, 1961	5th term	
201	Clark MacGregor	R	MN-03	January 3, 1961	5th term	Left the House in 1971.
202	David Martin	R	NE-03	January 3, 1961	5th term	
203	F. Bradford Morse	R	MA-05	January 3, 1961	5th term	
204	Charles Adams Mosher	R	OH-13	January 3, 1961	5th term	
205	Arnold Olsen	D	MT-01	January 3, 1961	5th term	Left the House in 1971.
206	Otis G. Pike	D	NY-01	January 3, 1961	5th term	
207	Ben Reifel	R	SD-01	January 3, 1961	5th term	Left the House in 1971.
208	Richard L. Roudebush	R	IN-05	January 3, 1961	5th term	Left the House in 1971.
209	William Fitts Ryan	D	NY-20	January 3, 1961	5th term	
210	Garner E. Shriver	R	KS-04	January 3, 1961	5th term	
211	Robert Stafford	R	VT	January 3, 1961	5th term	
212	Robert Grier Stephens Jr.	D	GA-10	January 3, 1961	5th term	
213	Vernon Wallace Thomson	R	WI-03	January 3, 1961	5th term	
214	Mo Udall	D	AZ-02	May 2, 1961	5th term	
215	Henry B. González	D	TX-20	November 4, 1961	5th term	
216	Lucien N. Nedzi	D	MI-14	November 7, 1961	5th term	
217	Joe Waggonner	D	LA-04	December 19, 1961	5th term	
218	Graham B. Purcell Jr.	D	TX-13	January 27, 1962	5th term	
219	Ray Roberts	D	TX-04	January 30, 1962	5th term	
220	Benjamin S. Rosenthal	D	NY-08	February 20, 1962	5th term	
221	George Brown Jr.	D	CA-29	January 3, 1963	4th term	Left the House in 1971.
222	Bill Brock	R	TN-03	January 3, 1963	4th term	Left the House in 1971.
223	Jim Broyhill	R	NC-10	January 3, 1963	4th term	
224	Laurence J. Burton	R	UT-01	January 3, 1963	4th term	Left the House in 1971.
225	James Colgate Cleveland	R	NH-02	January 3, 1963	4th term	
226	Lionel Van Deerlin	D	CA-37	January 3, 1963	4th term	
227	Don Edwards	D	CA-09	January 3, 1963	4th term	
228	Donald M. Fraser	D	MN-05	January 3, 1963	4th term	
229	Richard Fulton	D	TN-05	January 3, 1963	4th term	
230	Don Fuqua	D	FL-02	January 3, 1963	4th term	
231	Sam Gibbons	D	FL-06	January 3, 1963	4th term	
232	James R. Grover	R	NY-02	January 3, 1963	4th term	
233	Richard T. Hanna	D	CA-34	January 3, 1963	4th term	
234	Augustus F. Hawkins	D	CA-21	January 3, 1963	4th term	
235	Frank Horton	R	NY-36	January 3, 1963	4th term	
236	J. Edward Hutchinson	R	MI-04	January 3, 1963	4th term	
237	Robert L. Leggett	D	CA-04	January 3, 1963	4th term	
238	Clarence Long	D	MD-02	January 3, 1963	4th term	
239	John Otho Marsh Jr.	D	VA-07	January 3, 1963	4th term	Left the House in 1971.
240	Spark Matsunaga	D	HI	January 3, 1963	4th term	
241	Robert McClory	R	IL-12	January 3, 1963	4th term	
242	Joseph McDade	R	PA-10	January 3, 1963	4th term	
243	Joseph Minish	D	NJ-11	January 3, 1963	4th term	
244	Rogers Morton	R	MD-01	January 3, 1963	4th term	
245	John M. Murphy	D	NY-16	January 3, 1963	4th term	
246	William St. Onge	D	CT-02	January 3, 1963	4th term	Died on May 1, 1970.
247	Edward J. Patten	D	NJ-15	January 3, 1963	4th term	
248	Jimmy Quillen	R	TN-01	January 3, 1963	4th term	
249	Claude Pepper	D	FL-11	January 3, 1963	4th term	
250	Charlotte Thompson Reid	R	IL-15	January 3, 1963	4th term	
251	Ogden Reid	R	NY-26	January 3, 1963	4th term	
252	Edward R. Roybal	D	CA-30	January 3, 1963	4th term	
253	Donald Rumsfeld	R	IL-13	January 3, 1963	4th term	Resigned on May 25, 1969.
254	Joe Skubitz	R	KS-05	January 3, 1963	4th term	
255	Burt L. Talcott	R	CA-12	January 3, 1963	4th term	
256	Charles H. Wilson	D	CA-31	January 3, 1963	4th term	
257	John W. Wydler	R	NY-04	January 3, 1963	4th term	
258	Don H. Clausen	R	CA-01	January 22, 1963	4th term	
259	Del M. Clawson	R	CA-23	June 11, 1963	4th term	
260	Fred B. Rooney	D	PA-15	July 30, 1963	4th term	
261	Mark Andrews	R	ND-01	October 22, 1963	4th term	
262	Albert W. Johnson	R	PA-23	November 5, 1963	4th term	
263	J. J. Pickle	D	TX-10	December 21, 1963	4th term	
264	Phillip Burton	D	CA-06	February 18, 1964	4th term	
265	William J. Green, III	D	PA-05	April 28, 1964	4th term	
266	Thomas S. Gettys	D	SC-05	November 3, 1964	4th term	
267	William L. Hungate	D	MO-09	November 3, 1964	4th term	
268	Wendell Wyatt	R	OR-01	November 3, 1964	4th term	
269	Brock Adams	D	WA-07	January 3, 1965	3rd term	
270	William Anderson	D	TN-06	January 3, 1965	3rd term	
271	Frank Annunzio	D	IL-07	January 3, 1965	3rd term	
272	Jonathan Brewster Bingham	D	NY-23	January 3, 1965	3rd term	
273	John Hall Buchanan Jr.	R	AL-06	January 3, 1965	3rd term	
274	Earle Cabell	D	TX-05	January 3, 1965	3rd term	
275	Tim Lee Carter	R	KY-05	January 3, 1965	3rd term	
276	Barber Conable	R	NY-37	January 3, 1965	3rd term	
277	John Conyers	D	MI-01	January 3, 1965	3rd term	
278	John Culver	D	IA-02	January 3, 1965	3rd term	
279	Glenn Robert Davis	R	WI-09	January 3, 1965; Previous service, 1947–1957.	8th term*	
280	Bill Dickinson	R	AL-02	January 3, 1965	3rd term	
281	John Duncan Sr.	R	TN-02	January 3, 1965	3rd term	
282	Jack Edwards	R	AL-01	January 3, 1965	3rd term	
283	John N. Erlenborn	R	IL-14	January 3, 1965	3rd term	
284	Frank Evans	D	CO-03	January 3, 1965	3rd term	
285	Tom Foley	D	WA-05	January 3, 1965	3rd term	
286	William Ford	D	MI-15	January 3, 1965	3rd term	
287	Kika De la Garza	D	TX-15	January 3, 1965	3rd term	
288	Lee Hamilton	D	IN-09	January 3, 1965	3rd term	
289	James M. Hanley	D	NY-34	January 3, 1965	3rd term	
290	William Hathaway	D	ME-02	January 3, 1965	3rd term	
291	Floyd Hicks	D	WA-06	January 3, 1965	3rd term	
292	James J. Howard	D	NJ-03	January 3, 1965	3rd term	
293	Andrew Jacobs Jr.	D	IN-11	January 3, 1965	3rd term	
294	Henry Helstoski	D	NJ-09	January 3, 1965	3rd term	
295	James Kee	D	WV-05	January 3, 1965	3rd term	
296	Speedy O. Long	D	LA-08	January 3, 1965	3rd term	
297	Richard D. McCarthy	D	NY-39	January 3, 1965	3rd term	Left the House in 1971.
298	Robert C. McEwen	R	NY-31	January 3, 1965	3rd term	
299	Lloyd Meeds	D	WA-02	January 3, 1965	3rd term	
300	Patsy Mink	D	HI	January 3, 1965	3rd term	
301	Chester L. Mize	R	KS-02	January 3, 1965	3rd term	Left the House in 1971.
302	Maston E. O'Neal Jr.	D	GA-02	January 3, 1965	3rd term	Left the House in 1971.
303	Richard Ottinger	D	NY-25	January 3, 1965	3rd term	Left the House in 1971.
304	Edwin Reinecke	R	CA-27	January 3, 1965	3rd term	Resigned on January 21, 1969.
305	Daniel J. Ronan	D	IL-06	January 3, 1965	3rd term	Died on August 13, 1969.
306	David E. Satterfield III	D	VA-03	January 3, 1965	3rd term	
307	James H. Scheuer	D	NY-21	January 3, 1965	3rd term	
308	Henry P. Smith III	R	NY-40	January 3, 1965	3rd term	
309	J. William Stanton	R	OH-11	January 3, 1965	3rd term	
310	John V. Tunney	D	CA-38	January 3, 1965	3rd term	Resigned on January 2, 1971.
311	George Watkins	R	PA-09	January 3, 1965	3rd term	Died on August 7, 1970.
312	Lester L. Wolff	D	NY-03	January 3, 1965	3rd term	
313	Sidney Yates	D	IL-09	January 3, 1965; Previous service, 1949–1963.	10th term*	
314	Joseph P. Vigorito	D	PA-24	January 3, 1965	3rd term	
315	Richard Crawford White	D	TX-16	January 3, 1965	3rd term	
316	Albert Watson	R	SC-02	June 15, 1965; Previous service, 1963–1965.	5th term*	Left the House in 1971.
317	Edwin Edwards	D	LA-07	October 2, 1965	3rd term	
318	Clarence E. Brown Jr.	R	OH-07	November 2, 1965	3rd term	
319	Thomas M. Rees	D	CA-26	December 15, 1965	3rd term	
320	Walter B. Jones Sr.	D	NC-01	February 5, 1966	3rd term	
321	Jerome R. Waldie	D	CA-14	June 7, 1966	3rd term	
322	Guy Vander Jagt	R	MI-09	November 8, 1966	3rd term	
323	David Pryor	D	AR-04	November 8, 1966	3rd term	
324	Tom Bevill	D	AL-07	January 3, 1967	2nd term	
325	Edward G. Biester Jr.	R	PA-08	January 3, 1967	2nd term	
326	Benjamin B. Blackburn	R	GA-04	January 3, 1967	2nd term	
327	Ray Blanton	D	TN-07	January 3, 1967	2nd term	
328	Frank J. Brasco	D	NY-11	January 3, 1967	2nd term	
329	Jack Thomas Brinkley	D	GA-03	January 3, 1967	2nd term	
330	Donald G. Brotzman	R	CO-02	January 3, 1967; Previous service, 1963–1965.	3rd term*	
331	Garry E. Brown	R	MI-03	January 3, 1967	2nd term	
332	J. Herbert Burke	R	FL-10	January 3, 1967	2nd term	
333	George H. W. Bush	R	TX-07	January 3, 1967	2nd term	Left the House in 1971.
334	Daniel E. Button	R	NY-29	January 3, 1967	2nd term	Left the House in 1971.
335	William O. Cowger	R	KY-03	January 3, 1967	2nd term	Left the House in 1971.
336	John R. Dellenback	R	OR-04	January 3, 1967	2nd term	
337	Robert Vernon Denney	R	NE-01	January 3, 1967	2nd term	Left the House in 1971.
338	Robert C. Eckhardt	D	TX-08	January 3, 1967	2nd term	
339	Joshua Eilberg	D	PA-04	January 3, 1967	2nd term	
340	Edwin Duing Eshleman	R	PA-16	January 3, 1967	2nd term	
341	Marvin L. Esch	R	MI-02	January 3, 1967	2nd term	
342	Nick Galifianakis	D	NC-04	January 3, 1967	2nd term	
343	George Atlee Goodling	R	PA-19	January 3, 1967; Previous service, 1961–1965.	4th term*	
344	Gilbert Gude	R	MD-08	January 3, 1967	2nd term	
345	John Paul Hammerschmidt	R	AR-03	January 3, 1967	2nd term	
346	Margaret Heckler	R	MA-10	January 3, 1967	2nd term	
347	John E. Hunt	R	NJ-01	January 3, 1967	2nd term	
348	Abraham Kazen	D	TX-23	January 3, 1967	2nd term	
349	Thomas S. Kleppe	R	ND-02	January 3, 1967	2nd term	Left the House in 1971.
350	Dan Kuykendall	R	TN-09	January 3, 1967	2nd term	
351	John Henry Kyl	R	IA-04	January 3, 1967; Previous service, 1959–1965.	5th term*	
352	Peter Kyros	D	ME-01	January 3, 1967	2nd term	
353	Sherman P. Lloyd	R	UT-02	January 3, 1967; Previous service, 1963–1965.	3rd term*	
354	Buz Lukens	R	OH-24	January 3, 1967	2nd term	Left the House in 1971.
355	Bob Mathias	R	CA-18	January 3, 1967	2nd term	
356	Wiley Mayne	R	IA-06	January 3, 1967	2nd term	
357	James A. McClure	R	ID-01	January 3, 1967	2nd term	
358	Jack H. McDonald	R	MI-19	January 3, 1967	2nd term	
359	Thomas Joseph Meskill	R	CT-06	January 3, 1967	2nd term	Left the House in 1971.
360	Clarence E. Miller	R	OH-10	January 3, 1967	2nd term	
361	Sonny Montgomery	D	MS-04	January 3, 1967	2nd term	
362	John Myers	R	IN-07	January 3, 1967	2nd term	
363	Bill Nichols	D	AL-04	January 3, 1967	2nd term	
364	Jerry Pettis	R	CA-33	January 3, 1967	2nd term	
365	Howard Wallace Pollock	D	AK	January 3, 1967	2nd term	Left the House in 1971.
366	Bob Price	R	TX-18	January 3, 1967	2nd term	
367	Tom Railsback	R	IL-19	January 3, 1967	2nd term	
368	John Rarick	D	LA-06	January 3, 1967	2nd term	
369	Donald W. Riegle Jr.	R	MI-07	January 3, 1967	2nd term	
370	William V. Roth Jr.	R	DE	January 3, 1967	2nd term	Resigned on December 31, 1970.
371	Philip Ruppe	R	MI-11	January 3, 1967	2nd term	
372	Charles W. Sandman Jr.	R	NJ-02	January 3, 1967	2nd term	
373	Henry C. Schadeberg	R	WI-01	January 3, 1967; Previous service, 1961–1965.	4th term*	Left the House in 1971.
374	Fred Schwengel	R	IA-01	January 3, 1967; Previous service, 1955–1965.	7th term*	
375	William J. Scherle	R	IA-07	January 3, 1967	2nd term	
376	William L. Scott	R	VA-08	January 3, 1967	2nd term	
377	Gene Snyder	R	KY-04	January 3, 1967; Previous service, 1963–1965.	3rd term*	
378	Sam Steiger	R	AZ-03	January 3, 1967	2nd term	
379	William A. Steiger	R	WI-06	January 3, 1967	2nd term	
380	W. S. Stuckey Jr.	D	GA-08	January 3, 1967	2nd term	
381	Robert Taft Jr.	R	OH-01	January 3, 1967; Previous service, 1963–1965.	3rd term*	Left the House in 1971.
382	Fletcher Thompson	R	GA-05	January 3, 1967	2nd term	
383	William C. Wampler	R	VA-09	January 3, 1967; Previous service, 1953–1955.	3rd term*	
384	Charles W. Whalen Jr.	R	OH-03	January 3, 1967	2nd term	
385	Charles E. Wiggins	R	CA-25	January 3, 1967	2nd term	
386	Lawrence G. Williams	R	PA-07	January 3, 1967	2nd term	
387	Larry Winn	R	KS-03	January 3, 1967	2nd term	
388	Chalmers Wylie	R	OH-15	January 3, 1967	2nd term	
389	Louis C. Wyman	R	NH-01	January 3, 1967; Previous service, 1963–1965.	3rd term*	
390	Roger H. Zion	R	IN-08	January 3, 1967	2nd term	
391	John M. Zwach	R	MN-06	January 3, 1967	2nd term	
392	Robert Tiernan	D	RI-02	March 28, 1967	2nd term	
393	Pete McCloskey	R	CA-11	December 12, 1967	2nd term	
394	Bertram L. Podell	D	NY-13	February 20, 1968	2nd term	
395	Charles H. Griffin	D	MS-03	March 12, 1968	2nd term	
396	James M. Collins	R	TX-03	August 24, 1968	2nd term	
397	Joseph M. Gaydos	D	PA-20	November 5, 1968	2nd term	
398	Bill Alexander	D	AR-01	January 3, 1969	1st term	
399	Glenn M. Anderson	D	CA-17	January 3, 1969	1st term	
400	John Glenn Beall Jr.	R	MD-06	January 3, 1969	1st term	Left the House in 1971.
401	Mario Biaggi	D	NY-24	January 3, 1969	1st term	
402	Bill Burlison	D	MO-10	January 3, 1969	1st term	
403	Patrick T. Caffery	D	LA-03	January 3, 1969	1st term	
404	John Newbold Camp	R	OK-06	January 3, 1969	1st term	
405	William V. Chappell Jr.	D	FL-04	January 3, 1969	1st term	
406	Shirley Chisholm	D	NY-12	January 3, 1969	1st term	
407	Bill Clay	D	MO-01	January 3, 1969	1st term	
408	Lawrence Coughlin	R	PA-13	January 3, 1969	1st term	
409	Dan Daniel	D	VA-05	January 3, 1969	6th term	
410	David W. Dennis	R	IN-10	January 3, 1969	1st term	
411	Hamilton Fish	R	NY-28	January 3, 1969	1st term	
412	Walter Flowers	D	AL-05	January 3, 1969	1st term	
413	Lou Frey	R	FL-05	January 3, 1969	1st term	
414	Ed Foreman	R	NM-02	January 3, 1969; Previous service, 1963–1965.	2nd term*	Left the House in 1971.
415	Orval H. Hansen	R	ID-02	January 3, 1969	1st term	
416	James F. Hastings	R	NY-38	January 3, 1969	1st term	
417	Lawrence Hogan	R	MD-05	January 3, 1969	1st term	
418	Ed Koch	D	NY-17	January 3, 1969	1st term	
419	Earl Landgrebe	R	IN-02	January 3, 1969	1st term	
420	Allard K. Lowenstein	D	NY-05	January 3, 1969	1st term	Left the House in 1971.
421	Manuel Lujan Jr.	R	NM-01	January 3, 1969	1st term	
422	James Robert Mann	D	SC-04	January 3, 1969	1st term	
423	Martin B. McKneally	R	NY-27	January 3, 1969	1st term	Left the House in 1971.
424	Abner J. Mikva	D	IL-02	January 3, 1969	1st term	
425	Wilmer Mizell	R	NC-05	January 3, 1969	1st term	
426	Bob Mollohan	D	WV-01	January 3, 1969; Previous service, 1953–1957.	3rd term*	
427	L. Richardson Preyer	D	NC-06	January 3, 1969	1st term	
428	Earl B. Ruth	R	NC-08	January 3, 1969	1st term	
429	Keith Sebelius	R	KS-01	January 3, 1969	1st term	
430	Louis Stokes	D	OH-21	January 3, 1969	1st term	
431	James W. Symington	D	MO-02	January 3, 1969	1st term	
432	Lowell P. Weicker Jr.	R	CT-04	January 3, 1969	1st term	Left the House in 1971.
433	G. William Whitehurst	R	VA-02	January 3, 1969	1st term	
434	John S. Wold	R	WY	January 3, 1969	1st term	Left the House in 1971.
435	Gus Yatron	D	PA-06	January 3, 1969	1st term	
	Ed Jones	D	TN-08	March 25, 1969	1st term	
	Dave Obey	D	WI-07	April 1, 1969	1st term	
	Barry Goldwater Jr.	R	CA-27	April 29, 1969	1st term	
	John Melcher	D	MT-02	June 24, 1969	1st term	
	Michael J. Harrington	D	MA-06	September 30, 1969	1st term	
	Robert A. Roe	D	NJ-08	November 4, 1969	1st term	
	Phil Crane	R	IL-13	November 25, 1969	1st term	
	John H. Rousselot	R	CA-24	June 30, 1970; Previous service, 1961–1963.	2nd term*	
	John G. Schmitz	R	CA-35	June 30, 1970	1st term	
	Charles J. Carney	D	OH-19	November 3, 1970	1st term	
	George W. Collins	D	IL-06	November 3, 1970	1st term	
	Edwin B. Forsythe	R	NJ-06	November 3, 1970	1st term	
	Robert H. Steele	R	CT-02	November 3, 1970	1st term	
	John H. Ware III	R	PA-09	November 3, 1970	1st term	

== Delegates ==
Rank	Delegate	Party	District	Seniority date (Previous service, if any)	No.# of term(s)	Notes
1	Jorge Luis Córdova	PNP	PR	January 3, 1969	1st term	

== See also ==
- 91st United States Congress
- List of United States congressional districts
- List of United States senators in the 91st Congress
