= Talio Magalei =

American Samoan politician and judge

Member of the Senate
- In office 1973–1978
- Constituency: Tualauta County

Personal details
- Born: 8 March 1918; Tula, American Samoa
- Died: 4 July 1978 (aged 60); Faga'alu, American Samoa

Talio Pouli Magalei (8 March 1918 – 4 July 1978) was an American Samoan judge and politician. He served three terms in the Senate during the 1970s.

== Biography ==
Magalei became a village judge and also temporarily served on the High Court. During World War II he joined the US Marine Corps as a medical surveyor.

In the 1972 elections he was elected to the Senate, and was subsequently re-elected in 1974 and 1976. He died in 1978 at the age of 60.
