= 1972 American Samoan legislative election =

Legislative elections were held in American Samoa on 7 November 1972, alongside a referendum on electing the Governor.

== Results ==
Successful candidates in the Senate election included Tago Ativalu, Talio Magalei and Fainu'ulelei S. Utu.

== Aftermath ==
Following the elections, Governor John Morse Haydon was called before a Civil Service Commission tribunal, having been charged with attempting to influence the elections by telling voters not to vote for non-Samoan candidates (of which there was only one in the election, Wilbur Reine in Manu'a). When interviewed on the WVUV radio station prior to the elections, Haydon had said he could not give his views on individual candidates as he was bound by the Hatch Act, but that he thought it would be a "very serious mistake" for voters to elect a non-Samoan during the transition to self-government. The tribunal ruled that Haydon had not violated the Hatch Act as the intervention was limited to a single interview and had not used his influence over subordinates, and that in borderline cases the First Amendment required ruling in favor of the defendant.
