= Tago Ativalu =

American Samoan politician

Member of the Senate
- In office 1973–1984

Personal details
- Died: 3 May 1985 (aged 62) Pago Pago, American Samoa

Tago Ativalu (died 3 May 1985) was an American Samoan politician. He served in the Senate from 1973 to 1984.

== Biography ==
Ativalu worked as a police officer and became a civil servant in the Department of Public Works. He also served in the United States Marine Corps Reserve and was a member of the Veterans Association.

He was elected to the Senate of the Thirteenth Legislature in 1972. He was re-elected in 1974, 1976, 1978, 1980 and 1982. During his time in the Senate he served as chair of the Samoan Affairs Committee and vice chairman of the Senate Rules Committee. He also sat on the Agriculture, Public Safety, Public Works and Transportation committees.

Having served as a deacon in the Congregational Christian Church in Nuʻuuli for several years, he became elder deacon in Fagaloa and Ituau in 1985. He died later in the year in Pago Pago at the age of 62.
