= Bill Hefner =

American politician

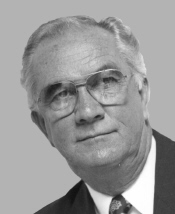

Member of the U.S. House of Representatives from North Carolina's 8th district
- In office January 3, 1975 – January 3, 1999
- Preceded by: Earl B. Ruth
- Succeeded by: Robin Hayes

Personal details
- Born: Willie Gathrel Hefner; April 11, 1930 Elora, Tennessee, U.S.
- Died: September 2, 2009 (aged 79) Huntsville, Alabama, U.S.
- Party: Democratic
- Spouse: Nancy Hefner
- Education: University of Alabama, Tuscaloosa

Willie Gathrel Hefner (April 11, 1930 – September 2, 2009), was an American radio personality and Democratic U.S. congressman from North Carolina, serving between 1975 and 1999.

== Life and career ==
Born in Elora, Tennessee, Hefner graduated from high school in Sardis, Alabama. He attended the University of Alabama, and he became the president and owner of radio station WRKB in Kannapolis, North Carolina. He was a member of the Harvesters Quartet, a group of gospel music singers based in North Carolina, from 1954 to 1967, and was a television performer on numerous North Carolina TV channels.

In 1974, he was elected as a Democrat to the 94th United States Congress; he served a total of 12 terms, from January 3, 1975, until January 3, 1999, when he retired from Congress.

Hefner built a reputation as an advocate for veterans, and the Veterans Affairs Medical Center in Salisbury, North Carolina, was renamed in his honor on April 16, 1999.

After retiring from Congress, Hefner moved with his wife, Nancy, to Alabama. He served from October 2001 until November 2002 as the District One commissioner for Marshall County, Alabama. He died in Huntsville, Alabama, on September 2, 2009, after suffering a brain aneurysm.

U.S. House of Representatives
Preceded by Earl B. Ruth	Member of the U.S. House of Representatives from North Carolina's 8th congressional district 1975–1999	Succeeded by Robin Hayes
Party political offices
Preceded by Robert Byrd, Alan Cranston, Al Gore, Gary Hart, Bennett Johnston, Ted Kennedy, Tip O'Neill, Don Riegle, Paul Sarbanes, Jim Sasser	Response to the State of the Union address 1983; Served alongside: Les AuCoin, Joe Biden, Bill Bradley, Robert Byrd, Tom Daschle, Barbara Kennelly, George Miller, Tip O'Neill, Paul Simon, Paul Tsongas, Tim Wirth	Succeeded by Max Baucus, Joe Biden, David Boren, Barbara Boxer, Robert Byrd, Dante Fascell, Bill Gray, Tom Harkin, Dee Huddleston, Carl Levin, Tip O'Neill, Claiborne Pell
