= List of United States senators in the 91st Congress =

This is a complete list of United States senators during the 91st United States Congress listed by seniority from January 3, 1969, to January 3, 1971.

Order of service is based on the commencement of the senator's first term. Behind this is former service as a senator (only giving the senator seniority within their new incoming class), service as vice president, a House member, a cabinet secretary, or a governor of a state. The final factor is the population of the senator's state.

In this congress, J. William Fulbright (Arkansas) was the senior junior senator and Ted Stevens (Alaska) was the junior senior senator.

Senators who were sworn in during the middle of the two-year congressional term (up until the last senator who was not sworn in early after winning the November 1970 election) are listed at the end of the list with no number.

== Terms of service ==
| Class | Terms of service of senators that expired in years |
|---|---|
| Class 1 | Terms of service of senators that expired in 1971 (AZ, CA, CT, DE, FL, HI, IN, MA, MD, ME, MI, MN, MO, MS, MT, ND, NE, NJ, NM, NV, NY, OH, PA, RI, TN, TX, UT, VA, VT, WA, WI, WV, and WY.) |
| Class 2 | Terms of service of senators that expired in 1973 (AK, AL, AR, CO, DE, GA, IA, ID, IL, KS, KY, LA, MA, ME, MI, MN, MS, MT, NC, NE, NH, NJ, NM, OK, OR, RI, SC, SD, TN, TX, VA, WV, and WY.) |
| Class 3 | Terms of service of senators that expired in 1975 (AL, AK, AZ, AR, CA, CO, CT, FL, GA, HI, ID, IL, IN, IA, KS, KY, LA, MD, MO, NC, NH, NV, NY, ND, OH, OK, OR, PA, SC, SD, UT, VT, WA, and WI.) |

== U.S. Senate seniority list ==
U.S. Senate seniority
| Rank | Senator (party-state) | Seniority date | Other factors |
|---|---|---|---|
| 1 | Richard Russell, Jr. (D-GA) | January 12, 1933 | |
| 2 | Allen J. Ellender (D-LA) | January 3, 1937 | |
| 3 | George Aiken (R-VT) | January 10, 1941 | |
| 4 | James Eastland (D-MS) | January 3, 1943 | Previously a senator |
| 5 | John Little McClellan (D-AR) | January 3, 1943 | |
| 6 | Warren G. Magnuson (D-WA) | December 14, 1944 | |
| 7 | J. William Fulbright (D-AR) | January 3, 1945 | |
| 8 | Milton Young (R-ND) | March 12, 1945 | |
| 9 | Spessard Holland (D-FL) | September 24, 1946 | |
| 10 | John Sparkman (D-AL) | November 6, 1946 | |
| 11 | John J. Williams (R-DE) | January 3, 1947 | |
| 12 | John C. Stennis (D-MS) | November 17, 1947 | |
| 13 | Karl Mundt (R-SD) | December 31, 1948 | Former representative |
| 14 | Russell B. Long (D-LA) | December 31, 1948 | |
| 15 | Margaret Chase Smith (R-ME) | January 3, 1949 | Former representative (8 years, 7 months) |
| 16 | Clinton Anderson (D-NM) | January 3, 1949 | Former representative (4 years, 5 months) |
| 17 | John O. Pastore (D-RI) | December 19, 1950 | |
| 18 | Everett Dirksen (R-IL) | January 3, 1951 | Former representative |
| 19 | Wallace F. Bennett (R-UT) | January 3, 1951 | |
| 20 | Albert Gore, Sr. (D-TN) | January 3, 1953 | Former representative (14 years) |
| 21 | Henry M. Jackson (D-WA) | January 3, 1953 | Former representative (12 years) |
| 22 | Mike Mansfield (D-MT) | January 3, 1953 | Former representative (10 years) |
| 23 | Stuart Symington (D-MO) | January 3, 1953 | |
| 24 | Sam Ervin (D-NC) | June 5, 1954 | |
| 25 | Norris Cotton (R-NH) | November 8, 1954 | Former representative (7 years, 10 months) |
| 26 | Roman Hruska (R-NE) | November 8, 1954 | Former representative (1 year, 10 months) |
| 27 | Alan Bible (D-NV) | December 2, 1954 | |
| 28 | Carl Curtis (R-NE) | January 1, 1955 | |
| 29 | Clifford P. Case (R-NJ) | January 3, 1955 | Former representative |
| 30 | Gordon L. Allott (R-CO) | January 3, 1955 | |
| 31 | John Sherman Cooper (R-KY) | November 7, 1956 | Previously a senator (twice) (total tenure 4 years, 4 months) |
| 32 | Strom Thurmond (R-SC) | November 7, 1956 | Previously a senator (1 year, 3 months) |
| 33 | Herman Talmadge (D-GA) | January 3, 1957 | Former governor |
| 34 | Frank Church (D-ID) | January 3, 1957 | |
| 35 | Jacob K. Javits (R-NY) | January 9, 1957 | |
| 36 | Ralph Yarborough (D-TX) | April 29, 1957 | |
| 37 | William Proxmire (D-WI) | August 28, 1957 | |
| 38 | Ben Jordan (D-NC) | April 19, 1958 | |
| 39 | Jennings Randolph (D-WV) | November 5, 1958 | |
| 40 | Hugh Scott (R-PA) | January 3, 1959 | Former representative (18 years) |
| 41 | Eugene McCarthy (D-MN) | January 3, 1959 | Former representative (10 years) |
| 42 | Stephen Young (D-OH) | January 3, 1959 | Former representative (8 years), Ohio 5th in population (1950) |
| 43 | Winston L. Prouty (R-VT) | January 3, 1959 | Former representative (8 years), Vermont 46th in population (1950) |
| 44 | Robert Byrd (D-WV) | January 3, 1959 | Former representative (6 years) |
| 45 | Harrison A. Williams (D-NJ) | January 3, 1959 | Former representative (4 years), New Jersey 8th in population (1950) |
| 46 | Thomas J. Dodd (D-CT) | January 3, 1959 | Former representative (4 years), Connecticut 34th in population (1950) |
| 47 | Edmund Muskie (D-ME) | January 3, 1959 | Former governor |
| 48 | Philip Hart (D-MI) | January 3, 1959 | Michigan 7th in population (1950) |
| 49 | Vance Hartke (D-IN) | January 3, 1959 | Indiana 11th in population (1950) |
| 50 | Frank Moss (D-UT) | January 3, 1959 | Utah 38th in population (1950) |
| 51 | Gale W. McGee (D-WY) | January 3, 1959 | Wyoming 48th in population (1950) |
| 52 | Howard Cannon (D-NV) | January 3, 1959 | Nevada 49th in population (1950) |
| 53 | Hiram Fong (R-HI) | August 21, 1959 | |
| 54 | Quentin Northrup Burdick (D-ND) | August 8, 1960 | |
| 55 | Lee Metcalf (D-MT) | January 3, 1961 | Former representative (8 years) |
| 56 | James Boggs (R-DE) | January 3, 1961 | Former representative (6 years) |
| 57 | Jack Miller (R-IA) | January 3, 1961 | Iowa 22nd in population (1950) |
| 58 | Claiborne Pell (D-RI) | January 3, 1961 | Rhode Island 36th in population (1950) |
| 59 | John Tower (R-TX) | June 15, 1961 | |
| 60 | James B. Pearson (R-KS) | January 31, 1962 | |
| 61 | Len Jordan (R-ID) | August 6, 1962 | |
| 62 | Ted Kennedy (D-MA) | November 7, 1962 | Massachusetts 9th in population (1960) |
| 63 | Thomas J. McIntyre (D-NH) | November 7, 1962 | New Hampshire 45th in population (1960) |
| 64 | Abraham A. Ribicoff (D-CT) | January 3, 1963 | Former representative (4 years), former cabinet secretary |
| 65 | George McGovern (D-SD) | January 3, 1963 | Former representative (4 years) - South Dakota 40th in population (1960) |
| 66 | Daniel Inouye (D-HI) | January 3, 1963 | Former representative (4 years) - Hawaii 43rd in population (1960) |
| 67 | Peter H. Dominick (R-CO) | January 3, 1963 | Former representative (2 years) |
| 68 | Birch Bayh (D-IN) | January 3, 1963 | |
| 69 | Gaylord Nelson (D-WI) | January 7, 1963 | |
| 70 | Joseph Montoya (D-NM) | November 4, 1964 | Former representative |
| 71 | Fred R. Harris (D-OK) | November 4, 1964 | |
| 72 | Walter Mondale (D-MN) | December 30, 1964 | |
| 73 | George Murphy (R-CA) | January 1, 1965 | |
| 74 | Joseph Tydings (D-MD) | January 3, 1965 | Former representative |
| 75 | Paul Fannin (R-AZ) | January 3, 1965 | |
| 76 | Harry F. Byrd, Jr. (D-VA) | November 12, 1965 | |
| 77 | Robert P. Griffin (R-MI) | May 11, 1966 | |
| 78 | Ernest Hollings (D-SC) | November 9, 1966 | |
| 79 | William B. Spong, Jr. (D-VA) | December 31, 1966 | |
| 80 | Clifford Hansen (R-WY) | January 3, 1967 | Former governor |
| 81 | Charles H. Percy (R-IL) | January 3, 1967 | Illinois 4th in population (1960) |
| 82 | Edward Brooke (R-MA) | January 3, 1967 | Massachusetts 9th in population (1960) |
| 83 | Howard Baker (R-TN) | January 3, 1967 | Tennessee 17th in population (1960) |
| 84 | Mark Hatfield (R-OR) | January 10, 1967 | |
| 85 | Charles Goodell (R-NY) | September 10, 1968 | |
| 86 | Marlow Cook (R-KY) | December 17, 1968 | |
| 87 | Ted Stevens (R-AK) | December 24, 1968 | |
| 88 | Thomas Eagleton (D-MO) | December 28, 1968 | |
| 89 | Barry Goldwater (R-AZ) | January 3, 1969 | Previously a senator |
| 90 | Richard Schweiker (R-PA) | January 3, 1969 | Former representative (8 years) - Pennsylvania 3rd in population (1960) |
| 91 | Charles Mathias (R-MD) | January 3, 1969 | Former representative (8 years) - Maryland 21st in population (1960) |
| 92 | Bob Dole (R-KS) | January 3, 1969 | Former representative (8 years) - Kansas 29th in population (1960) |
| 93 | Edward J. Gurney (R-FL) | January 3, 1969 | Former representative (6 years) |
| 94 | Harold Hughes (D-IA) | January 3, 1969 | Former governor, Iowa 24th in population (1960) |
| 95 | Henry Bellmon (R-OK) | January 3, 1969 | Former governor, Oklahoma 27th in population (1960) |
| 96 | Alan Cranston (D-CA) | January 3, 1969 | California 2nd in population (1960) |
| 97 | William B. Saxbe (R-OH) | January 3, 1969 | Ohio 5th in population (1960) |
| 98 | James Allen (D-AL) | January 3, 1969 | Alabama 19th in population (1960) |
| 99 | Bob Packwood (R-OR) | January 3, 1969 | Oregon 32nd in population (1960) |
| 100 | Mike Gravel (D-AK) | January 3, 1969 | Alaska 50th in population (1960) |
| | Ralph Smith (R-IL) | September 17, 1969 | |
| | Adlai Stevenson III (D-IL) | November 17, 1970 | |
| | Bill Roth (R-DE) | January 1, 1971 | |
| | John V. Tunney (D-CA) | January 2, 1971 | |

The senior senators by class were Spessard Holland (D-Florida) from Class 1, Richard Russell Jr. (D-Georgia) from Class 2, and George Aiken (R-Vermont) from Class 3.

== See also ==
- 91st United States Congress
- List of United States representatives in the 91st Congress
