= Earl B. Ruth =

American politician (1916–1989)

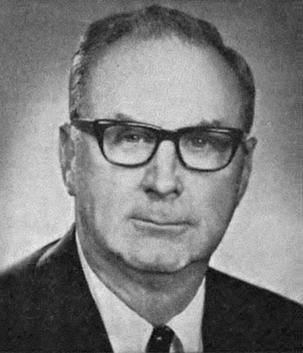

Governor of American Samoa
- In office February 6, 1975 – September 30, 1976
- Appointed by: Gerald R. Ford
- Preceded by: Frank C. Mockler
- Succeeded by: Frank E. Barnett

Member of the U.S. House of Representatives from North Carolina's 8th district
- In office January 3, 1969 – January 3, 1975
- Preceded by: Charles R. Jonas
- Succeeded by: Bill Hefner

Personal details
- Born: Earl Baker Ruth; February 7, 1916 Spencer, North Carolina, US
- Died: August 15, 1989 (aged 73) Salisbury, North Carolina, US
- Party: Republican
- Spouse: Jane Wylie Ruth
- Education: University of North Carolina

Earl Baker Ruth (February 7, 1916 – August 15, 1989) was a three-term U.S. Representative from North Carolina and subsequently served as governor of American Samoa.

Born in Spencer, North Carolina, Ruth graduated from Central High School in Charlotte, North Carolina in 1934. He earned a B.A. at the University of North Carolina in Chapel Hill, North Carolina in 1938 and a M.A. from the same institution in 1942. He completed his graduate-level education with a Ph.D. from the school in 1955. He was a teacher and coach at Chapel Hill High School, 1938–1940. Chapel Hill, North Carolina In 1933 Ruth was the North Carolina High School tennis champion (singles). While at UNC, Chapel Hill Ruth was a basketball standout, serving as captain of the Tar Heel team in both his Junior and Senior years (1936–37 and 1937–38).

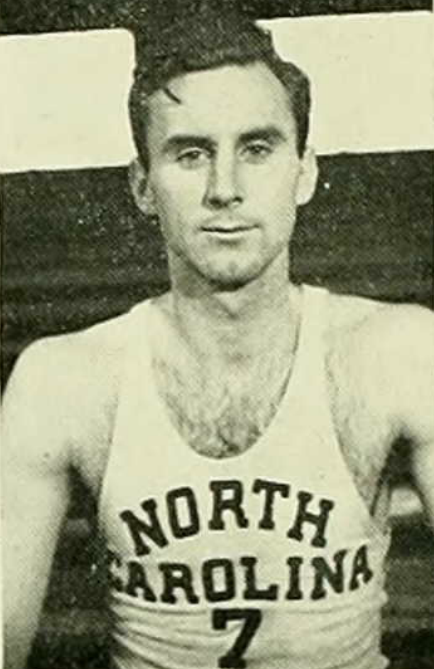
Ruth in 1938 as UNC basketball team captain

He subsequently served in the United States Navy. Ruth was head basketball coach and director of athletics at Catawba College in Salisbury, North Carolina from 1946 to 1960. From 1960 to 1968 he served as the dean of students there. He was member of Salisbury City Council from 1963 to 1968, serving as mayor pro tempore from 1967 to 1968.

Ruth was elected as a Republican to the Ninety-first and to the two succeeding Congresses (January 3, 1969 – January 3, 1975). He was an unsuccessful candidate for re-election to the Ninety-fourth Congress in 1974. He was then appointed by President of the United States Gerald R. Ford to be Governor of American Samoa from 1975 to 1976. During his period as Governor of American Samoa opposition to the practice of the federal government appointing governors grew stronger. Within eighteen months, Ruth had removed numerous Samoans in administrative posts, who had been appointed by former Governor John Morse Haydon. Ruth was soon recalled to Washington, DC, and was quoted for having called Samoans "lazy, thieving liars."

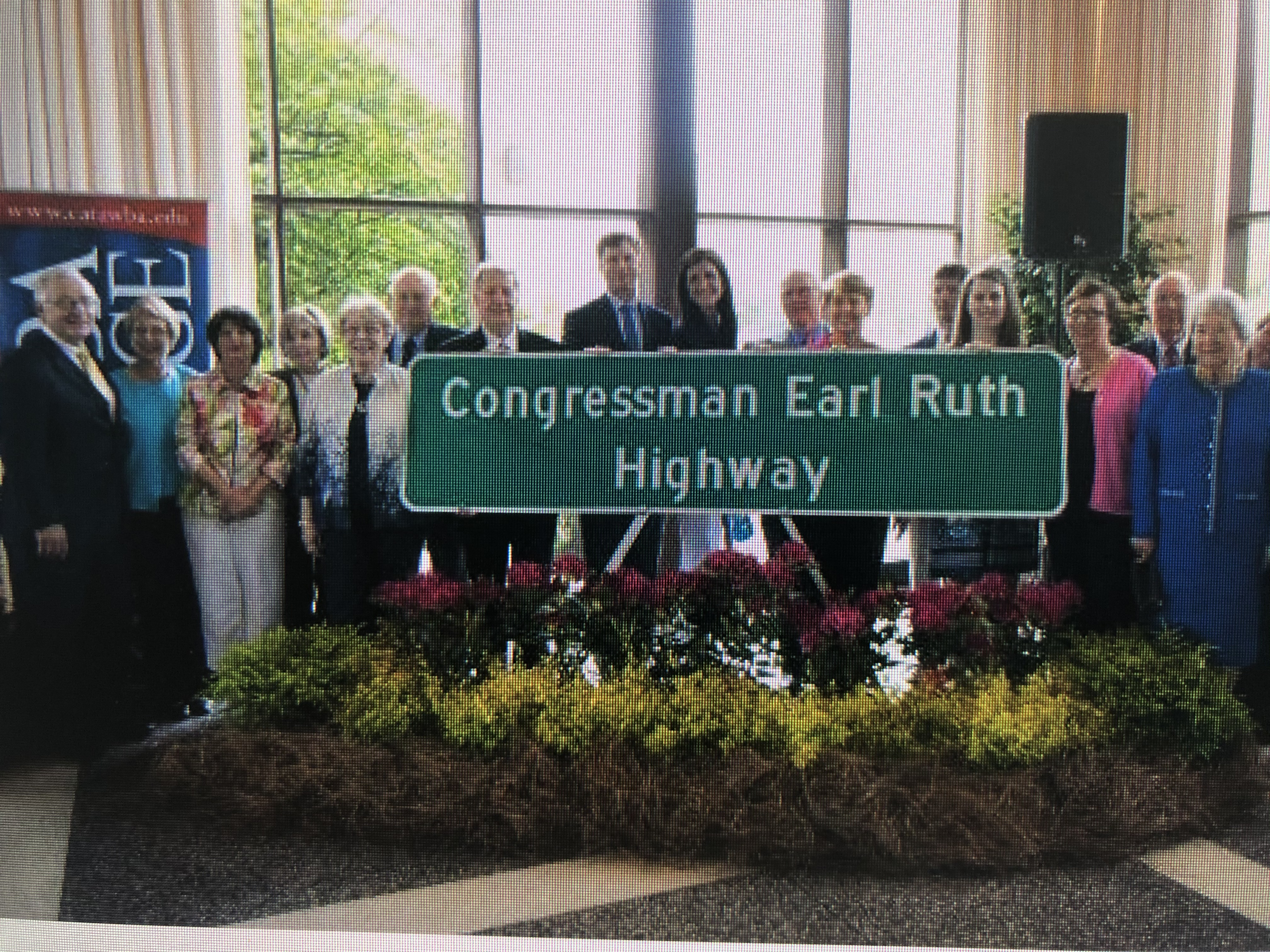
Dedication of Congressman Earl Ruth Highway in 2012

== Personal life ==
Ruth's wife was Jane Wylie Ruth. On August 15, 1989 Ruth died in Salisbury. He is interred in Salisbury National Cemetery.

=== Legacy ===
In 2012, the North Carolina Department of Transportation named a section of U.S. 601 in Rowan County "Congressman Earl Ruth Highway" in his honor.

In 1976, following the brief and unpopular tenure of Governor Ruth — who had removed several Samoans from administrative posts previously filled by John Morse Haydon — Samoans overwhelmingly approved a referendum granting them the right to elect their own governor. This marked a decisive turn away from the longstanding practice of appointing governors, a practice that had sparked considerable opposition when Ruth took office. Although American Samoans had rejected the proposal to elect their governor in three earlier plebiscites, the 1976 vote changed course. Shortly thereafter, Ruth was recalled to Washington, DC. Since that time, American Samoans have elected both a governor and a lieutenant governor every four years.

U.S. House of Representatives
Preceded by Charles R. Jonas	Member of the U.S. House of Representatives from North Carolina's 8th congressional district 1969–1975	Succeeded by Bill Hefner
