= 1974 American Samoan electoral referendum =

American Samoan ballot measure

- 18 June 1974
- Shall the people of American Samoa elect a Governor and Lieutenant Governor by popular vote?

Results
Choice	Votes	%
Yes	2,093	47.20%
No	2,341	52.80%
Valid votes	4,434	100.00%
Invalid or blank votes	0	0.00%
Total votes	4,434	100.00%
Registered voters/turnout		17.20%

A referendum on direct election of governors and vice governors was held in American Samoa on 18 June 1974. Voters were asked to approve a proposal which permitted direct popular election of governors and lieutenant governors. The measure was narrowly rejected, with 47% voting yes and 53% voting no. An identical measure would be put before voters again two years later and was passed.

== Results ==
Voters were asked the question "Shall the people of American Samoa elect a governor and lieutenant-governor by popular vote?"

Choice	Votes	%
For	2,093	47.2
Against	2,341	52.8
Total	4,434	100
Registered voters/turnout		79
Source: PIM
