= Confederate Soldier Memorial (Columbus, Ohio) =

Monument in Columbus, Ohio, U.S.

Coordinates: 39°56′37.75″N 83°04′33.65″W

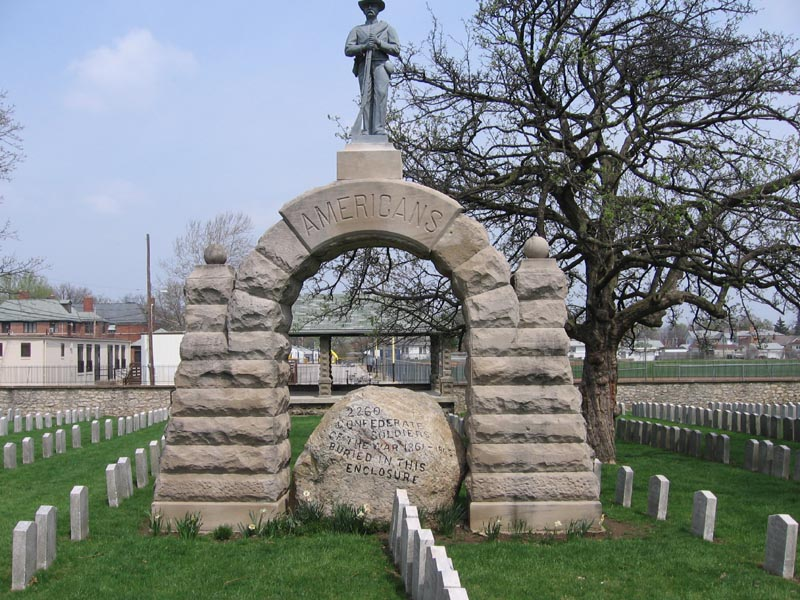
- The monument in 2006
- Interactive map of Confederate Soldier Memorial
- Location: Columbus, Ohio, U.S.

The Confederate Soldier Memorial, also known as Confederate Monument and Memorial Arch, is an outdoor Confederate memorial installed at Camp Chase in the Hilltop neighborhood of Columbus, Ohio, in the United States.

== Description and history ==
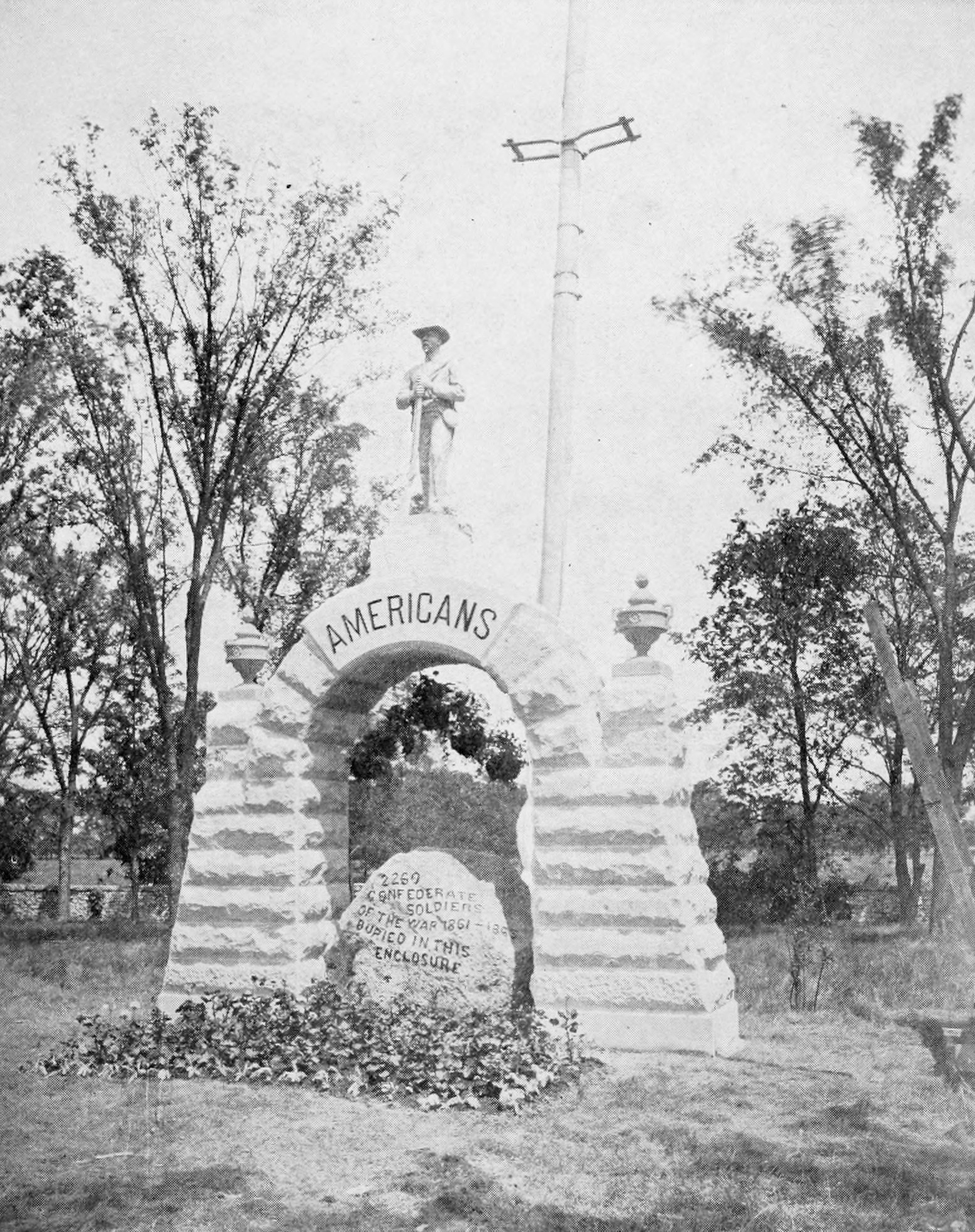
The monument in 1909

Camp Chase was originally the location of a Union prisoner-of-war camp for captured Confederate prisoners. The camp was poorly managed with most Confederate prisoners only being given one pair of underwear and one blanket during winter. 499 of the 2,260 being held at the camp died in the first two months of 1865. After the war, a former Union soldier raised money to maintain a cemetery and a memorial at the site. The full memorial was paid for by Union supporters with the soldier on the top facing south, with the intent to symbolise peace between the Union and former Confederacy.

The monument was erected in 1902 and commemorates the 2,260 Confederate soldiers buried at the site. The memorial is 17 feet (5.2 m) and includes a bronze figure of a soldier standing on a granite arch, holding a rifle. Its original wooden arch, which was inscribed with the word "AMERICANS", was replaced with the current stone arch in 1902. An annual memorial service is held at the monument with flags of the United States and Confederate Battle Flags being placed on the nearby graves of the respective soldiers.

The statue on top was toppled and destroyed by vandals overnight on August 22, 2017 with the soldier being decapatated. The memorial was repaired and re-installed in May 2019.

== See also ==
- 1902 in art
- List of Confederate monuments and memorials
