= 1976 American Samoan constitutional referendum =

American Samoan ballot measure

A constitutional referendum was held in American Samoa on 2 November 1976. The amendment proposed introducing a new section 25 to Chapter II, article 25 of the constitution, which would have read:

Section 25. Compensation of the legislature. The compensation of the members of the Legislature is provided by law.

The proposal was approved by voters in the referendum, and subsequently by the American Department of the Interior on 8 April 1977.
