= 1976 American Samoan electoral referendum =

American Samoan ballot measure

- 31 August 1976
- Do the people of American Samoa want an elected Governor and Lieutenant Governor?

Results
Choice	Votes	%
Yes	3,044	69.02%
No	1,366	30.98%

A referendum on direct election of governors and vice governors was held in American Samoa on 31 August 1976. Voters were asked to approve a proposal which permitted direct popular election of governors and lieutenant governors. Turnout was low, but higher than previously at 24%. At this referendum, the fourth time the same proposal had been put before voters, it was solidly passed and direct election of governors and their lieutenants began with the election the following year.

== Results ==
Choice	Votes	%
For	3,044	69.02
Against	1,366	30.98
Total	4,410	100.00
Registered voters/turnout		24
Source: Direct Democracy
