= 1974 United States House of Representatives elections =

House elections for the 94th U.S. Congress

- November 5, 1974

All 435 seats in the United States House of Representatives 218 seats needed for a majority
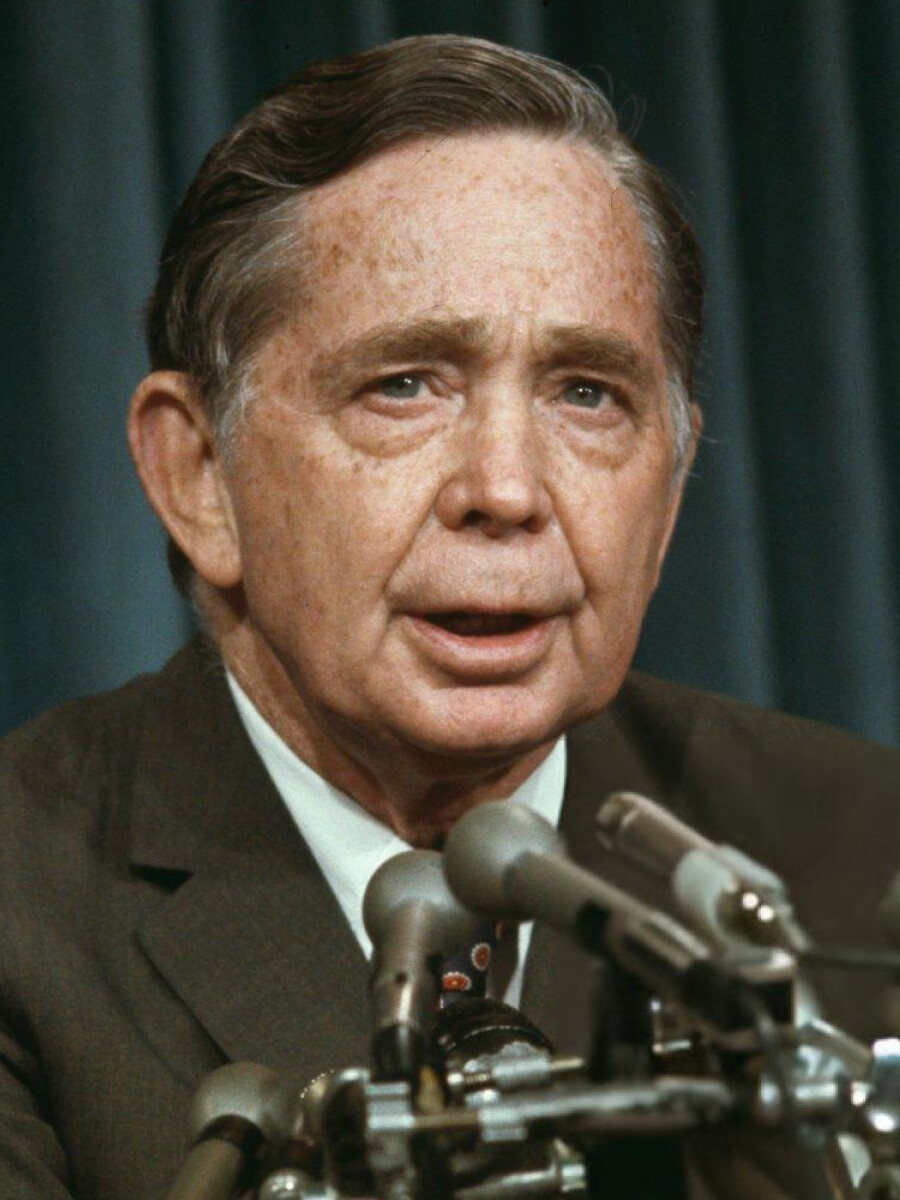

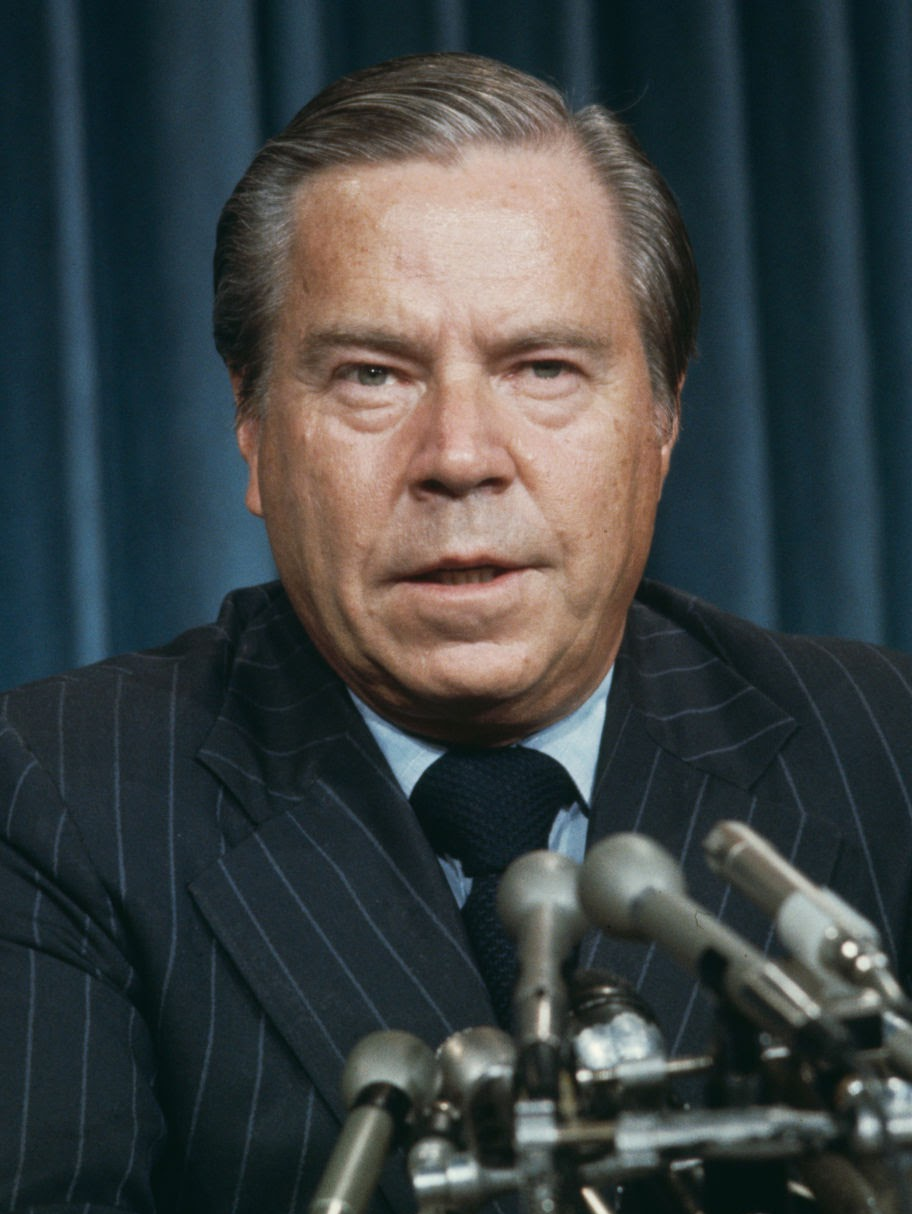
	Majority party	Minority party
Leader	Carl Albert	John Rhodes
Party	Democratic	Republican
Leader since	January 21, 1971	December 7, 1973
Leader's seat	Oklahoma 3rd	Arizona 1st
Last election	242 seats	192 seats
Seats won	291	144
Seat change	▲49	▼48
Popular vote	30,054,097	21,271,332
Percentage	57.5%	40.7%
Swing	▲5.4pp	▼5.8pp
- Results: Democratic hold Democratic gain Republican hold Republican gain
Speaker before election
Carl Albert
Democratic
Elected Speaker
Carl Albert
Democratic

The 1974 United States House of Representatives elections were elections for the United States House of Representatives on November 5, 1974, to elect members to serve in the 94th United States Congress. They occurred in the wake of the Watergate scandal, which had forced President Richard Nixon to resign in favor of Gerald Ford. This scandal, along with high inflation, allowed the Democrats to make large gains in the midterm elections, taking 48 seats from the Republicans. An additional seat was gained, for a net gain of 49, when Representative Joe Moakley from Massachusetts switched his party affiliation back to Democrat after winning his 1972 election as an independent, thereby increasing their majority above the two-thirds mark. Altogether, there were 93 freshmen representatives in the 94th Congress when it convened on January 3, 1975 (76 of them Democrats). Those elected to office that year later came to be known collectively as "Watergate Babies." The gain of 49 Democratic seats was the largest pickup by the party since 1958. Only four Democratic incumbents lost their seats.

This would be the last time until the 2026 United States House of Representatives elections in which the Democratic Party would make a net gain of 45 or more seats.

== Overall results ==
391 incumbent members sought reelection, but eight were defeated in primaries and 40 defeated in the general election for a total of 343 incumbents winning. This was the lowest number and percentage of incumbents who won reelection between 1954 and 1992.

↓
291	144
Democratic	Republican

Summary of the November 5, 1974, United States House of Representatives election results

Popular vote and seats total by states

Parties	Seats				Popular vote		
Parties	1972	1974	+/-	Strength	Vote	%	Change
Democratic Party	242	291	+49	66.9%	30,054,097	57.5%	+5.4%
Republican Party	192	144	-48	33.1%	21,271,332	40.7%	-5.8%
Independents	1	0	-1	-	340,501	0.7%	+0.5%
American Party	0	0	-	-	238,265	0.5%	+0.2%
Conservative Party	0	0	-	-	115,980	0.2%	-0.1%
Liberal Party	0	0	-	-	56,714	0.1%	-0.1%
Peace and Freedom Party	0	0	-	-	35,984	0.1%	-
U.S. Labor Party	0	0	-	-	26,342	0.1%	+0.1%
Economic Justice Party	0	0	-	-	16,932	<0.1%	-
Constitution Party	0	0	-	-	16,822	<0.1%	-
Socialist Workers Party	0	0	-	-	13,982	<0.1%	-0.1%
George Wallace Party	0	0	-	-	11,943	<0.1%	-
Communist Party	0	0	-	-	10,627	<0.1%	-
Socialist Labor Party	0	0	-	-	10,564	<0.1%	-
Liberty Union Party	0	0	-	-	9,961	<0.1%	-
Independent Citizens' Action Party	0	0	-	-	9,520	<0.1%	-
Prohibition Party	0	0	-	-	8,387	<0.1%	-
Life, Liberty, Justice Party	0	0	-	-	8,199	<0.1%	-
Human Rights Party	0	0	-	-	6,700	<0.1%	-
National Democratic Party	0	0	-	-	5,723	<0.1%	-0.1%
Good Neighbor Party	0	0	-	-	4,266	<0.1%	-
Politicians Are Crooks Party	0	0	-	-	3,460	<0.1%	-
Libertarian Party	0	0	-	-	3,099	<0.1%	-
Independent Vermonters Party	0	0	-	-	2,641	<0.1%	-
New Leadership Party	0	0	-	-	1,778	<0.1%	-
Regular Democracy Party	0	0	-	-	1,451	<0.1%	-
Public Congress Party	0	0	-	-	1,241	<0.1%	-
Integrity in Government Party	0	0	-	-	1,182	<0.1%	-
Anti-monopoly Party	0	0	-	-	1,177	<0.1%	-
Christian Party	0	0	-	-	583	<0.1%	-
United Citizens Party	0	0	-	-	529	<0.1%	-
Others	0	0	-	-	6,543	<0.1%	-
Total	435	435	0	100.0%	52,313,457	100.0%	-

Popular vote
Democratic	57.45%
Republican	40.66%
Others	1.89%

House seats
Democratic	66.90%
Republican	33.10%

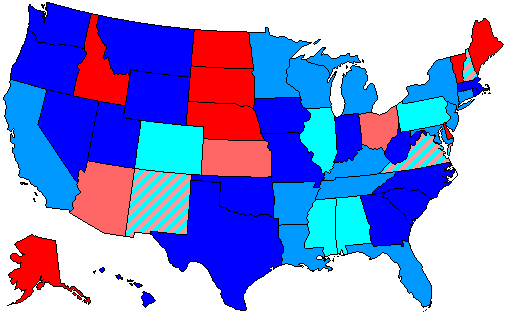
House seats by party holding plurality in state: 80+% Democratic / 80+% Republican; 60+% to 80% Democratic / 60+% to 80% Republican; Up to 60% Democratic / Up to 60% Republican

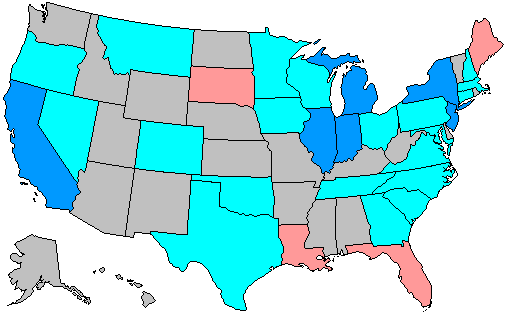
6+ Democratic gain / 6+ Republican gain; 3–5 Democratic gain / 3–5 Republican gain; 1–2 Democratic gain / 1–2 Republican gain; No net change

== Special elections ==
These elections were for the remainder of the term ending January 3, 1975.

District	Incumbent			This race	
District	Member	Party	First elected	Results	Candidates
Pennsylvania 12	John Saylor	Republican	1952	Incumbent died October 28, 1973. A special election was held February 5, 1974. Democratic gain.	✓ John Murtha (Democratic) 49.9%; Harry M. Fox (Republican) 49.7%; Duane H. McCormick (Constitution) 0.4%
Michigan 5	Gerald Ford	Republican	1948	Incumbent resigned December 6, 1973, to become vice president of the United States. A special election was held February 18, 1974. Democratic gain.	✓ Richard VanderVeen (Democratic) 50.9%; Robert VanderLaan (Republican) 44.3%; Dwight W. Johnson (American Independent) 4.4%; Frank Girard (Socialist Labor) 0.4%
Ohio 1	Bill Keating	Republican	1970	Incumbent resigned January 3, 1974, to take a position as president of The Cincinnati Enquirer. A special election was held March 5, 1974. Democratic gain.	✓ Tom Luken (Democratic) 51.9%; Bill Gradison (Republican) 48.1%
Michigan 8	James Harvey	Republican	1960	Incumbent resigned January 31, 1974, to become judge for the United States District Court for the Eastern District of Michigan. A special election was held April 16, 1974. Democratic gain.	✓ Bob Traxler (Democratic) 51.5%; James M. Sparling Jr. (Republican) 48.5%
California 6	Bill Mailliard	Republican	1952	Incumbent resigned March 5, 1974, to become U.S. ambassador to the Organization of American States. A special election was held June 4, 1974. Democratic gain.	✓ John Burton (Democratic) 50.0; Thomas Caylor (Republican) 21.2%; Terrence McGuire (Democratic) 8.7%; Jean Wall (Republican) 5.8%; Sean McCarthy (Republican) 5.3%; Alan F. Reeves (Democratic) 4.1%; Wesley Wilkes (Republican) 2.8%; Leslie A. Grant (Democratic) 2.1%
California 13	Charles Teague	Republican	1954	Incumbent died January 1, 1974. A special election was held June 4, 1974. Republican hold.	✓ Bob Lagomarsino (Republican) 53.6%; James D. Loebl (Democratic) 18.8%; James A. Browning (Democratic) 7.8%; Roger A. Ikola (Democratic) 6.3%; E. T. Jolicouer (Democratic) 6.0%; David H. Miller (Democratic) 3.2%; R. W. Handley (Democratic) 2.4%; F. Joe Beauchamp (Democratic) 1.9%

== Change in composition after the November elections ==
Democrats→			AL‑3	AL‑4	AL‑5	AL‑7	AZ‑2	AR‑1	AR‑2	AR‑4	CA‑1	CA‑3	CA‑4	CA‑5	CA‑6	CA‑7	CA‑8	CA‑9	CA‑10
FL‑1	CT‑6	CT‑3	CT‑1	CO‑3	CO‑1	CA‑42	CA‑38	CA‑36	CA‑32	CA‑31	CA‑30	CA‑29	CA‑28	CA‑25	CA‑23	CA‑21	CA‑15	CA‑14	CA‑11
FL‑2	FL‑3	FL‑4	FL‑7	FL‑8	FL‑11	FL‑13	FL‑14	FL‑15	GA‑1	GA‑2	GA‑3	GA‑5	GA‑6	GA‑7	GA‑8	GA‑9	GA‑10	HI‑1	HI‑2
KY‑2	KY‑1	KS‑2	IA‑4	IA‑2	IA‑1	IN‑9	IN‑4	IN‑3	IN‑1	IL‑24	IL‑23	IL‑22	IL‑11	IL‑9	IL‑8	IL‑7	IL‑5	IL‑2	IL‑1
KY‑3	KY‑6	KY‑7	LA‑1	LA‑2	LA‑4	LA‑5	LA‑7	LA‑8	MD‑2	MD‑3	MD‑6	MD‑7	MA‑2	MA‑3	MA‑4	MA‑6	MA‑7	MA‑8	MA‑9
MO‑1	MS‑3	MS‑2	MS‑1	MN‑8	MN‑7	MN‑5	MN‑4	MI‑17	MI‑16	MI‑15	MI‑14	MI‑13	MI‑12	MI‑8	MI‑7	MI‑5	MI‑1	MA‑12	MA‑11
MO‑2	MO‑3	MO‑4	MO‑5	MO‑6	MO‑8	MO‑9	MO‑10	MT‑2	NJ‑3	NJ‑4	NJ‑8	NJ‑9	NJ‑10	NJ‑11	NJ‑14	NJ‑15	NM‑2	NY‑1	NY‑6
NY‑37	NY‑32	NY‑28	NY‑24	NY‑22	NY‑21	NY‑20	NY‑19	NY‑18	NY‑17	NY‑16	NY‑15	NY‑14	NY‑13	NY‑12	NY‑11	NY‑10	NY‑9	NY‑8	NY‑7
NC‑1	NC‑2	NC‑3	NC‑4	NC‑6	NC‑7	NC‑11	OH‑9	OH‑14	OH‑18	OH‑19	OH‑20	OH‑21	OH‑22	OK‑1	OK‑2	OK‑3	OK‑4	OK‑5	OR‑2
SC‑5	SC‑4	SC‑3	SC‑1	RI‑2	RI‑1	PA‑24	PA‑22	PA‑21	PA‑20	PA‑15	PA‑14	PA‑12	PA‑11	PA‑6	PA‑4	PA‑3	PA‑2	PA‑1	OR‑3
TN‑4	TN‑5	TN‑7	TX‑1	TX‑2	TX‑4	TX‑6	TX‑8	TX‑9	TX‑10	TX‑11	TX‑12	TX‑14	TX‑15	TX‑16	TX‑17	TX‑18	TX‑19	TX‑20	TX‑21
Majority →																			TX‑22
WI‑4	WI‑2	WI‑1	WV‑4	WV‑3	WV‑2	WV‑1	WA‑7	WA‑6	WA‑5	WA‑4	WA‑3	WA‑2	VA‑5	VA‑3	VA‑1	UT‑2	UT‑1	TX‑24	TX‑23
WI‑5	WI‑7	WY	CA‑13	CA‑17	CA‑24	CA‑34	CA‑35	CO‑2	CT‑2	GA‑4	IL‑3	IL‑10	IL‑15	IN‑2	IN‑6	IN‑8	IN‑10	IN‑11	IA‑5
NC‑8	NC‑5	NY‑36	NY‑29	NY‑27	NY‑3	NY‑2	NJ‑13	NJ‑7	NJ‑2	NJ‑1	NH‑1	NV	MT‑1	MN‑6	MI‑18	MI‑6	MA‑5	MD‑5	IA‑6
OH‑23	OK‑6	OR‑1	OR‑4	PA‑7	SC‑6	TN‑3	TN‑8	TX‑13	VA‑8	VA‑10	WI‑3	WI‑8	SD‑1	PA‑25	OH‑1	ME‑1	LA‑6	FL‑5	WI‑9
PA‑17	PA‑18	PA‑19	PA‑23	SC‑2	SD‑2	TN‑1	TN‑2	TN‑6	TX‑3	TX‑5	TX‑7	VT	VA‑2	VA‑4	VA‑6	VA‑7	VA‑9	WA‑1	WI‑6
PA‑16	PA‑13	PA‑10	PA‑9	PA‑8	PA‑5	OH‑17	OH‑16	OH‑15	OH‑13	OH‑12	OH‑11	OH‑10	OH‑8	OH‑7	OH‑6	OH‑5	OH‑4	OH‑3	OH‑2
NH‑1	NJ‑5	NJ‑6	NJ‑12	NM‑1	NY‑4	NY‑5	NY‑23	NY‑25	NY‑26	NY‑30	NY‑31	NY‑33	NY‑34	NY‑35	NY‑38	NY‑39	NC‑9	NC‑10	ND
NE‑3	NE‑2	NE‑1	MO‑7	MS‑5	MS‑4	MN‑3	MN‑2	MN‑1	MI‑19	MI‑11	MI‑10	MI‑9	MI‑4	MI‑3	MI‑2	MA‑10	MA‑1	MD‑8	MD‑4
IL‑13	IL‑14	IL‑16	IL‑17	IL‑18	IL‑19	IL‑20	IL‑21	IN‑5	IN‑7	IA‑3	KS‑1	KS‑3	KS‑4	KS‑5	KY‑4	KY‑5	LA‑3	ME‑2	MD‑1
IL‑12	IL‑6	IL‑4	ID‑2	ID‑1	FL‑12	FL‑10	FL‑9	FL‑6	DE	CT‑5	CT‑4	CO‑5	CO‑4	CA‑43	CA‑41	CA‑40	CA‑39	CA‑37	CA‑33
Republicans→			AL‑1	AL‑2	AL‑6	AK	AZ‑1	AZ‑3	AZ‑4	AR‑3	CA‑2	CA‑12	CA‑16	CA‑18	CA‑19	CA‑20	CA‑22	CA‑26	CA‑27

== Alabama ==
District	Incumbent			This race	
District	Member	Party	First elected	Results	Candidates
Alabama 1	Jack Edwards	Republican	1964	Incumbent re-elected.	✓ Jack Edwards (Republican) 59.5%; Augusta A. Wilson (Democratic) 37.0%; Mary B. McCarthy (Nat Dem) 3.6%
Alabama 2	William Louis Dickinson	Republican	1964	Incumbent re-elected.	✓ William Louis Dickinson (Republican) 66.1%; Clair Chisler (Democratic) 33.9%
Alabama 3	William Flynt Nichols	Democratic	1966	Incumbent re-elected.	✓ William Flynt Nichols (Democratic) 95.9%; James R. Connell (Prohibition) 4.1%
Alabama 4	Tom Bevill	Democratic	1966	Incumbent re-elected.	✓ Tom Bevill (Democratic); Unopposed
Alabama 5	Robert E. Jones Jr.	Democratic	1947 (Special)	Incumbent re-elected.	✓ Robert E. Jones Jr. (Democratic); Unopposed
Alabama 6	John Hall Buchanan Jr.	Republican	1964	Incumbent re-elected.	✓ John Hall Buchanan Jr. (Republican) 57.0%; Nina Miglionico (Democratic) 41.3%; Elizabeth S. Dillard (Prohibition) 1.7%
Alabama 7	Walter Flowers	Democratic	1968	Incumbent re-elected.	✓ Walter Flowers (Democratic) 91.0%; Frank P. Walls (Con) 6.4%; Lewis Black (Nat Dem) 2.6%

== Alaska ==
District	Incumbent			This race	
District	Member	Party	First elected	Results	Candidates
Alaska at-large	Don Young	Republican	1973 (special)	Incumbent re-elected.	✓ Don Young (Republican) 53.8%; William L. Hensley (Democratic) 46.2%

== Arizona ==
District	Incumbent			This race	
District	Member	Party	First elected	Results	Candidates
Arizona 1	John Jacob Rhodes	Republican	1952	Incumbent re-elected.	✓ John Jacob Rhodes (Republican) 51.1%; Pat Fullinwider (Democratic) 42.3%; J. M. Sanders (Independent) 6.6%
Arizona 2	Mo Udall	Democratic	1961 (Special)	Incumbent re-elected.	✓ Mo Udall (Democratic) 62.0%; Keith Dolgaard (Republican) 38.0%
Arizona 3	Sam Steiger	Republican	1966	Incumbent re-elected.	✓ Sam Steiger (Republican) 51.1%; Pat Bosch (Democratic) 48.9%
Arizona 4	John Bertrand Conlan	Republican	1972	Incumbent re-elected.	✓ John Bertrand Conlan (Republican) 55.3%; Byron T. "Bud" Brown (Democratic) 44.7%

== Arkansas ==
District	Incumbent			This race	
District	Member	Party	First elected	Results	Candidates
Arkansas 1	William Vollie Alexander Jr.	Democratic	1968	Incumbent re-elected.	✓ William Vollie Alexander Jr. (Democratic) 90.6%; James Lawrence Dauer (Republican) 9.4%
Arkansas 2	Wilbur Mills	Democratic	1938	Incumbent re-elected.	✓ Wilbur Mills (Democratic) 58.9%; Judy Petty (Republican) 41.1%
Arkansas 3	John Paul Hammerschmidt	Republican	1966	Incumbent re-elected.	✓ John Paul Hammerschmidt (Republican) 51.8%; Bill Clinton (Democratic) 48.2%
Arkansas 4	Ray Thornton	Democratic	1972	Incumbent re-elected.	✓ Ray Thornton (Democratic); Unopposed

== California ==
District	Incumbent			This race	
District	Member	Party	First elected	Results	Candidates
California 1	Bizz Johnson; Redistricted from the 2nd district	Democratic	1958	Incumbent re-elected.	✓ Bizz Johnson (Democratic) 85.9%; Dorothy D. Paradis (American Independent) 14.1%
California 2	Don Clausen; Redistricted from the 1st district	Republican	1963 (Special)	Incumbent re-elected.	✓ Don Clausen (Republican) 53.0%; Oscar Klee (Democratic) 42.7%; Carole J. Glass (Peace and Freedom) 4.3%
California 3	John E. Moss	Democratic	1952	Incumbent re-elected.	✓ John E. Moss (Democratic) 72.3%; Ivaldo Lenci (Republican) 27.7%
California 4	Robert Leggett	Democratic	1962	Incumbent re-elected.	✓ Robert Leggett (Democratic); Unopposed
California 5	John Burton; Redistricted from the 6th district	Democratic	1974	Incumbent re-elected.	✓ John Burton (Democratic) 59.3%; Thomas Caylor (Republican) 38.0%; Raymond Broshears (Peace and Freedom) 2.7%
California 6	Phillip Burton; Redistricted from the 5th district	Democratic	1964	Incumbent re-elected.	✓ Phillip Burton (Democratic) 71.4%; Tom Spinosa (Republican) 21.7%; Emily L. Siegel (Peace and Freedom) 4.0%; Carl Richard Davis (American Independent) 2.9%
California 7	Jerome Waldie; Redistricted from the 14th district	Democratic	1966	Incumbent retired to run for governor of California. Democratic hold.	✓ George Miller (Democratic) 55.6%; Gary Fernandez (Republican) 44.4%
California 8	Ron Dellums; Redistricted from the 7th district	Democratic	1970	Incumbent re-elected.	✓ Ron Dellums (Democratic) 56.5%; Jack Redden (Republican) 39.7%; John Holland (American Independent) 3.8%
California 9	Pete Stark; Redistricted from the 8th district	Democratic	1972	Incumbent re-elected.	✓ Pete Stark (Democratic) 70.6%; Edson Adams (Republican) 29.4%
California 10	Don Edwards; Redistricted from the 9th district	Democratic	1962	Incumbent re-elected.	✓ Don Edwards (Democratic) 77.0%; John M. Enright (Republican) 23.0%
California 11	Leo Ryan	Democratic	1972	Incumbent re-elected.	✓ Leo Ryan (Democratic) 75.7%; Brainard "Bee" Merdinger (Republican) 21.3%; Nicholas W. Kudrovzeff (American Independent) 3.1%
California 12	Pete McCloskey; Redistricted from the 17th district	Republican	1967 (Special)	Incumbent re-elected.	✓ Pete McCloskey (Republican) 69.1%; Gary G. Gillmor (Democratic) 30.9%
California 13	Charles Gubser; Redistricted from the 10th district	Republican	1952	Incumbent retired. Democratic gain.	✓ Norman Mineta (Democratic) 52.6%; George W. Milias (Republican) 42.4%; Elizabeth Cervantes Barron (Peace and Freedom) 2.6%; Floyd S. Stancliffe (American Independent) 2.5%
California 14	John J. McFall; Redistricted from the 15th district	Democratic	1956	Incumbent re-elected.	✓ John J. McFall (Democratic) 70.8%; Charles M. "Chuck" Gibson (Republican) 24.1%; Roger A. Blain (American Independent) 5.1%
California 15	B. F. Sisk; Redistricted from the 16th district	Democratic	1954	Incumbent re-elected.	✓ B. F. Sisk (Democratic) 71.9%; Carol O. Harner (Republican) 28.1%
California 16	Burt Talcott; Redistricted from the 12th district	Republican	1962	Incumbent re-elected.	✓ Burt Talcott (Republican) 49.2%; Julian Camacho (Democratic) 47.9%; D. Jeff Mauro (American Independent) 3.0%
California 17	Bob Mathias; Redistricted from the 18th district	Republican	1966	Incumbent lost re-election. Democratic gain.	✓ John Hans Krebs (Democratic) 51.9%; Bob Mathias (Republican) 48.1%
California 18	William M. Ketchum; Redistricted from the 36th district	Republican	1972	Incumbent re-elected.	✓ William M. Ketchum (Republican) 52.6%; George A. Seielstad (Democratic) 47.4%
California 19	Robert Lagomarsino; Redistricted from the 13th district	Republican	1974	Incumbent re-elected.	✓ Robert Lagomarsino (Republican) 56.5%; James D. Loebl (Democratic) 43.5%
California 20	Barry Goldwater Jr. Redistricted from the 27th district	Republican	1969 (Special)	Incumbent re-elected.	✓ Barry Goldwater Jr. (Republican) 61.2%; Arline Mathews (Democratic) 38.8%
California 21	James C. Corman; Redistricted from the 22nd district	Democratic	1960	Incumbent re-elected.	✓ James C. Corman (Democratic) 73.5%; Mel Nadell (Republican) 26.5%
California 22	Carlos Moorhead; Redistricted from the 20th district	Republican	1972	Incumbent re-elected.	✓ Carlos Moorhead (Republican) 55.7%; Richard Hallin (Democratic) 44.3%
California 23	Thomas M. Rees; Redistricted from the 26th district	Democratic	1965 (Special)	Incumbent re-elected.	✓ Thomas M. Rees (Democratic) 71.5%; Jack E. Roberts (Republican) 28.5%
California 24	None (district created)			New seat. Democratic gain.	✓ Henry Waxman (Democratic) 64.2%; Elliott Stone Graham (Republican) 32.8%; David E. Davis (American Independent) 3.0%
California 25	Edward R. Roybal; Redistricted from the 30th district	Democratic	1962	Incumbent re-elected.	✓ Edward R. Roybal (Democratic); Unopposed
California 26	John H. Rousselot; Redistricted from the 24th district	Republican	1960; 1962 (defeated); 1970 (Special)	Incumbent re-elected.	✓ John H. Rousselot (Republican) 58.8%; Paul A. Conforti (Democratic) 41.2%
California 27	Alphonzo E. Bell Jr. Redistricted from the 28th district	Republican	1960	Incumbent re-elected.	✓ Alphonzo E. Bell Jr. (Republican) 63.8%; Michael Shapiro (Democratic) 32.6%; Jack Hampton (Peace and Freedom) 3.6%
California 28	Yvonne Brathwaite Burke; Redistricted from the 37th district	Democratic	1972	Incumbent re-elected.	✓ Yvonne Brathwaite Burke (Democratic) 80.3%; Tom Neddy (Republican) 19.7%
California 29	Augustus Hawkins; Redistricted from the 21st district	Democratic	1962	Incumbent re-elected.	✓ Augustus Hawkins (Democratic); Unopposed
California 30	George E. Danielson; Redistricted from the 29th district	Democratic	1970	Incumbent re-elected.	✓ George E. Danielson (Democratic) 74.2%; Richard E. Ferraro Jr. (Republican) 25.8%
California 30	Chet Holifield; Redistricted from the 19th district	Democratic	1942	Incumbent retired. Democratic loss.	✓ George E. Danielson (Democratic) 74.2%; Richard E. Ferraro Jr. (Republican) 25.8%
California 31	Charles H. Wilson	Democratic	1962	Incumbent re-elected.	✓ Charles H. Wilson (Democratic) 70.5%; Norman A. Hodges (Republican) 26.8%; William C. Taylor (Peace and Freedom) 2.7%
California 32	Glenn M. Anderson; Redistricted from the 35th district	Democratic	1968	Incumbent re-elected.	✓ Glenn M. Anderson (Democratic) 87.7%; Virgil V. Badalich (American Independent) 9.3%; Frank H. Walker (Peace and Freedom) 3.1%
California 33	Del M. Clawson; Redistricted from the 23rd district	Republican	1963 (Special)	Incumbent re-elected.	✓ Del M. Clawson (Republican) 53.4%; Robert E. White (Democratic) 43.1%; James C. Griffin (American Independent) 3.5%
California 34	Craig Hosmer; Redistricted from the 32nd district	Republican	1952	Incumbent retired. Democratic gain.	✓ Mark W. Hannaford (Democratic) 49.7%; Bill Bond (Republican) 46.3%; James Manis (American Independent) 2.0%; John S. Donohue (Peace and Freedom) 1.9%
California 35	Victor Veysey; Redistricted from the 43rd district	Republican	1970	Incumbent lost re-election. Democratic gain.	✓ James F. Lloyd (Democratic) 50.3%; Victor Veysey (Republican) 49.7%
California 36	George Brown Jr. Redistricted from the 38th district	Democratic	1962; 1970 (Retired); 1972	Incumbent re-elected.	✓ George Brown Jr. (Democratic) 62.6%; Jim Osgood (Republican) 32.3%; William Emery Pasley (American Independent) 5.1%
California 37	Jerry Pettis; Redistricted from the 33rd district	Republican	1966	Incumbent re-elected.	✓ Jerry Pettis (Republican) 63.0%; Bobby Ray Vincent (Democratic) 33.1%; John H. Ortman (American Independent) 3.9%
California 38	Richard T. Hanna; Redistricted from the 34th district	Democratic	1962	Incumbent retired. Democratic hold.	✓ Jerry M. Patterson (Democratic) 54.0%; David Rehmann (Republican) 41.3%; Lee R. Rayburn (American Independent) 3.2%; Larry B. Kallenberger (Peace and Freedom) 1.5%
California 39	Charles E. Wiggins; Redistricted from the 25th district	Republican	1966	Incumbent re-elected.	✓ Charles E. Wiggins (Republican) 55.2%; William E. "Bill" Farris (Democratic) 40.4%; Pat P. Scalera (American Independent) 4.4%
California 40	Andrew J. Hinshaw; Redistricted from the 39th district	Republican	1972	Incumbent re-elected.	✓ Andrew J. Hinshaw (Republican) 63.3%; Roderick J. "Rod" Wilson (Democratic) 31.0%; Grayson L. Watkins (American Independent) 5.7%
California 41	Bob Wilson; Redistricted from the 40th district	Republican	1952	Incumbent re-elected.	✓ Bob Wilson (Republican) 54.4%; Colleen Marie O'Connor (Democratic) 43.1%; Robert W. Franson (American Independent) 2.5%
California 42	Lionel Van Deerlin; Redistricted from the 41st district	Democratic	1962	Incumbent re-elected.	✓ Lionel Van Deerlin (Democratic) 68.9%; Wes Marden (Republican) 31.1%
California 43	Clair Burgener; Redistricted from the 42nd district	Republican	1972	Incumbent re-elected.	✓ Clair Burgener (Republican) 60.4%; Bill Bandes (Democratic) 39.6%

== Colorado ==
District	Incumbent			This race	
District	Member	Party	First elected	Results	Candidates
Colorado 1	Patricia Schroeder	Democratic	1972	Incumbent re-elected.	✓ Patricia Schroeder (Democratic) 58.5%; Frank Southworth (Republican) 40.8%; Elmer B. Sachs (American) 0.7%
Colorado 2	Donald G. Brotzman	Republican	1962; 1964 (defeated); 1966	Incumbent lost re-election. Democratic gain.	✓ Tim Wirth (Democratic) 51.9%; Donald G. Brotzman (Republican) 48.1%
Colorado 3	Frank Evans	Democratic	1964	Incumbent re-elected.	✓ Frank Evans (Democratic) 67.9%; E. Keith Records (Republican) 32.1%
Colorado 4	James Paul Johnson	Republican	1972	Incumbent re-elected.	✓ James Paul Johnson (Republican) 52.0%; John Carroll (Democratic) 48.0%
Colorado 5	William L. Armstrong	Republican	1972	Incumbent re-elected.	✓ William L. Armstrong (Republican) 57.7%; Ben Galloway (Democratic) 38.5%; Stan Johnson (Independent) 3.8%

== Connecticut ==
District	Incumbent			This race	
District	Member	Party	First elected	Results	Candidates
Connecticut 1	William R. Cotter	Democratic	1970	Incumbent re-elected.	✓ William R. Cotter (Democratic) 62.7%; Francis M. Buckley (Republican) 35.9%; Charlie A. Burke (George Wallace) 1.4%
Connecticut 2	Robert H. Steele	Republican	1970	Incumbent retired to run for governor of Connecticut. Democratic gain.	✓ Chris Dodd (Democratic) 59.0%; Samuel B. Hellier (Republican) 39.2%; Anthony Discepolo (Republican) 1.8%
Connecticut 3	Robert Giaimo	Democratic	1958	Incumbent re-elected.	✓ Robert Giaimo (Democratic) 65.1%; James Altham Jr. (Republican) 31.4%; Peter Koltypin (George Wallace) 2.1%; Joelle R. Fishman (Communist) 1.3%
Connecticut 4	Stewart McKinney	Republican	1970	Incumbent re-elected.	✓ Stewart McKinney (Republican) 53.2%; James G. Kellis (Democratic) 45.2%; Alan B. Fodeman (George Wallace) 1.6%
Connecticut 5	Ronald A. Sarasin	Republican	1972	Incumbent re-elected.	✓ Ronald A. Sarasin (Republican) 50.4%; William Ratchford (Democratic) 48.0%; Virginia A. Knauf (George Wallace) 1.6%
Connecticut 6	Ella T. Grasso	Democratic	1970	Incumbent retired to run for governor of Connecticut. Democratic hold.	✓ Toby Moffett (Democratic) 63.4%; Patsy J. Piscopo (Republican) 36.1%; Louis J. Marietta (Independent) 0.4%

== Delaware ==
District	Incumbent			This race	
District	Member	Party	First elected	Results	Candidates
Delaware at-large	Pierre S. du Pont IV	Republican	1970	Incumbent re-elected.	✓ Pierre S. du Pont IV (Republican) 58.5%; James R. Soles (Democratic) 39.6%; Donald G. Gies (American Independent) 0.8%; John Trager (Public Congress) 0.8%; George C. Brown (Prohibition) 0.2%; Melvin Dillard (Labor) 0.09%

== Florida ==
District	Incumbent			This race	
District	Member	Party	First elected	Results	Candidates
Florida 1	Bob Sikes	Democratic	1940; 1944 (resigned); 1974	Incumbent re-elected.	✓ Bob Sikes (Democratic); Unopposed
Florida 2	Don Fuqua	Democratic	1962	Incumbent re-elected.	✓ Don Fuqua (Democratic); Unopposed
Florida 3	Charles Edward Bennett	Democratic	1948	Incumbent re-elected.	✓ Charles Edward Bennett (Democratic); Unopposed
Florida 4	Bill Chappell	Democratic	1968	Incumbent re-elected.	✓ Bill Chappell (Democratic) 68.2%; Warren Hauser (Republican) 31.8%
Florida 5	Bill Gunter	Democratic	1972	Incumbent retired to run for U.S. senator. Republican gain.	✓ Richard Kelly (Republican) 52.8%; JoAnn Saunders (Democratic) 44.8%; Others (Write-in) 2.5%
Florida 6	Bill Young	Republican	1970	Incumbent re-elected.	✓ Bill Young (Republican) 75.8%; Mickey Monrose (Democratic) 24.2%
Florida 7	Sam M. Gibbons	Democratic	1962	Incumbent re-elected.	✓ Sam M. Gibbons (Democratic); Unopposed
Florida 8	James A. Haley	Democratic	1952	Incumbent re-elected.	✓ James A. Haley (Democratic) 56.7%; Joe Z. Lovingood (Republican) 43.3%
Florida 9	Louis Frey Jr.	Republican	1968	Incumbent re-elected.	✓ Louis Frey Jr. (Republican) 76.7%; William D. Rowland (Democratic) 23.3%
Florida 10	Skip Bafalis	Republican	1972	Incumbent re-elected.	✓ Skip Bafalis (Republican) 73.7%; Evelyn Tucker (Democratic) 26.3%
Florida 11	Paul Rogers	Democratic	1954	Incumbent re-elected.	✓ Paul Rogers (Democratic); Unopposed
Florida 12	J. Herbert Burke	Republican	1966	Incumbent re-elected.	✓ J. Herbert Burke (Republican) 51.0%; Charles Friedman (Democratic) 49.0%
Florida 13	William Lehman	Democratic	1972	Incumbent re-elected.	✓ William Lehman (Democratic); Unopposed
Florida 14	Claude Pepper	Democratic	1962	Incumbent re-elected.	✓ Claude Pepper (Democratic) 69.1%; Michael A. Carricarte (Republican) 30.9%
Florida 15	Dante Fascell	Democratic	1954	Incumbent re-elected.	✓ Dante Fascell (Democratic) 70.5%; S. Peter Capua (Republican) 29.5%

== Georgia ==
District	Incumbent			This race	
District	Member	Party	First elected	Results	Candidates
Georgia 1	Ronald "Bo" Ginn	Democratic	1972	Incumbent re-elected.	✓ Ronald "Bo" Ginn (Democratic) 86.1%; Bill Gowan (Republican) 13.9%
Georgia 2	Dawson Mathis	Democratic	1970	Incumbent re-elected.	✓ Dawson Mathis (Democratic); Unopposed
Georgia 3	Jack Thomas Brinkley	Democratic	1966	Incumbent re-elected.	✓ Jack Thomas Brinkley (Democratic) 87.7%; Carl P. Savage Jr. (Republican) 12.3%
Georgia 4	Benjamin B. Blackburn	Republican	1966	Incumbent lost re-election. Democratic gain.	✓ Elliott H. Levitas (Democratic) 55.1%; Benjamin B. Blackburn (Republican) 44.9%
Georgia 5	Andrew Young	Democratic	1972	Incumbent re-elected.	✓ Andrew Young (Democratic) 71.6%; Wyman C. Lowe (Republican) 28.4%
Georgia 6	Jack Flynt	Democratic	1954	Incumbent re-elected.	✓ Jack Flynt (Democratic) 51.5%; Newt Gingrich (Republican) 48.5%
Georgia 7	John W. Davis	Democratic	1960	Incumbent lost renomination. Democratic hold.	✓ Larry McDonald (Democratic) 50.3%; Quincy Collins (Republican) 49.7%
Georgia 8	W. S. Stuckey Jr.	Democratic	1966	Incumbent re-elected.	✓ W. S. Stuckey Jr. (Democratic); Unopposed
Georgia 9	Phillip M. Landrum	Democratic	1952	Incumbent re-elected.	✓ Phillip M. Landrum (Democratic) 74.8%; Ronald D. Reeves (Republican) 25.2%
Georgia 10	Robert Grier Stephens Jr.	Democratic	1960	Incumbent re-elected.	✓ Robert Grier Stephens Jr. (Democratic) 68.4%; Gary Pleger (Republican) 31.6%

== Hawaii ==
District	Incumbent			This race	
District	Member	Party	First elected	Results	Candidates
Hawaii 1	Spark Matsunaga	Democratic	1962	Incumbent re-elected.	✓ Spark Matsunaga (Democratic) 59.3%; William B. Paul (Republican) 40.7%
Hawaii 2	Patsy Mink	Democratic	1964	Incumbent re-elected.	✓ Patsy Mink (Democratic) 62.6%; Carla W. Coray (Republican) 37.4%

== Idaho ==
District	Incumbent			This race	
District	Member	Party	First elected	Results	Candidates
Idaho 1	Steve Symms	Republican	1972	Incumbent re-elected.	✓ Steve Symms (Republican) 58.3%; J. Ray Cox (Democratic) 41.7%
Idaho 2	Orval H. Hansen	Republican	1968	Incumbent lost renomination. Republican hold.	✓ George V. Hansen (Republican) 55.7%; Max Hanson (Democratic) 44.3%

== Illinois ==
District	Incumbent			This race	
District	Member	Party	First elected	Results	Candidates
Illinois 1	Ralph H. Metcalfe	Democratic	1970	Incumbent re-elected.	✓ Ralph H. Metcalfe (Democratic) 93.7%; Oscar H. Haynes (Republican) 5.5%; Willie Mae Reid (Socialist Workers) 0.8%
Illinois 2	Morgan F. Murphy	Democratic	1970	Incumbent re-elected.	✓ Morgan F. Murphy (Democratic) 87.5%; James J. Ginderske (Republican) 12.5%
Illinois 3	Robert P. Hanrahan	Republican	1972	Incumbent lost re-election. Democratic gain.	✓ Marty Russo (Democratic) 52.6%; Robert P. Hanrahan (Republican) 47.4%
Illinois 4	Ed Derwinski	Republican	1958	Incumbent re-elected.	✓ Ed Derwinski (Republican) 59.2%; Ronald A. Rodger (Democratic) 40.8%
Illinois 5	John C. Kluczynski	Democratic	1950	Incumbent re-elected.	✓ John C. Kluczynski (Democratic) 86.0%; William H. G. Toms (Republican) 14.0%
Illinois 6	Harold R. Collier	Republican	1956	Incumbent retired. Republican hold.	✓ Henry Hyde (Republican) 53.4%; Edward V. Hanrahan (Democratic) 46.6%
Illinois 7	Cardiss Collins	Democratic	1973 (Special)	Incumbent re-elected.	✓ Cardiss Collins (Democratic) 87.9%; Donald L. Metzger (Republican) 12.1%
Illinois 8	Dan Rostenkowski	Democratic	1958	Incumbent re-elected.	✓ Dan Rostenkowski (Democratic) 86.5%; Salvatore E. Oddo (Republican) 13.5%
Illinois 9	Sidney R. Yates	Democratic	1948; 1962 (retired); 1964	Incumbent re-elected.	✓ Sidney R. Yates (Democratic); Unopposed
Illinois 10	Samuel H. Young	Republican	1972	Incumbent lost re-election. Democratic gain.	✓ Abner J. Mikva (Democratic) 50.9%; Samuel H. Young (Republican) 49.1%
Illinois 11	Frank Annunzio	Democratic	1964	Incumbent re-elected.	✓ Frank Annunzio (Democratic) 72.4%; Mitchell G. Zadrozny (Republican) 27.6%
Illinois 12	Phil Crane	Republican	1969 (Special)	Incumbent re-elected.	✓ Phil Crane (Republican) 61.1%; Betty C. Spence (Democratic) 38.9%
Illinois 13	Robert McClory	Republican	1962	Incumbent re-elected.	✓ Robert McClory (Republican) 54.5%; Stanley W. Beetham (Democratic) 45.5%
Illinois 14	John N. Erlenborn	Republican	1964	Incumbent re-elected.	✓ John N. Erlenborn (Republican) 66.6%; Robert H. Renshaw (Democratic) 33.4%
Illinois 15	Leslie C. Arends	Republican	1934	Incumbent retired. Democratic gain.	✓ Tim Lee Hall (Democratic) 52.0%; Cliffard D. Carlson (Republican) 45.6%; K. Douglas Lassiter (Independent) 2.4%
Illinois 16	John B. Anderson	Republican	1960	Incumbent re-elected.	✓ John B. Anderson (Republican) 55.5%; Marshall Hungness (Democratic) 28.7%; W. John Schade Jr. (Independent) 15.8%
Illinois 17	George M. O'Brien	Republican	1972	Incumbent re-elected.	✓ George M. O'Brien (Republican) 51.5%; John J. Houlihan (Democratic) 48.5%
Illinois 18	Robert H. Michel	Republican	1956	Incumbent re-elected.	✓ Robert H. Michel (Republican) 54.8%; Steven L. Nordvall (Democratic) 45.2%
Illinois 19	Tom Railsback	Republican	1966	Incumbent re-elected.	✓ Tom Railsback (Republican) 65.3%; Jim Gende (Democratic) 34.7%
Illinois 20	Paul Findley	Republican	1960	Incumbent re-elected.	✓ Paul Findley (Republican) 54.8%; Peter F. Mack (Democratic) 45.2%
Illinois 21	Edward Rell Madigan	Republican	1972	Incumbent re-elected.	✓ Edward Rell Madigan (Republican) 65.8%; Richard N. Small (Democratic) 34.2%
Illinois 22	George E. Shipley	Democratic	1958	Incumbent re-elected.	✓ George E. Shipley (Democratic) 59.8%; William A. Young (Republican) 40.2%
Illinois 23	Melvin Price	Democratic	1944	Incumbent re-elected.	✓ Melvin Price (Democratic) 80.5%; Scott Randolph (Republican) 19.5%
Illinois 24	Kenneth J. Gray	Democratic	1954	Incumbent retired. Democratic hold.	✓ Paul Simon (Democratic) 59.5%; Val Oshel (Republican) 40.5%

== Indiana ==
Results in Indiana

District	Incumbent			This race	
District	Member	Party	First elected	Results	Candidates
Indiana 1	Ray J. Madden	Democratic	1942	Incumbent re-elected.	✓ Ray J. Madden (Democratic) 68.6%; Joseph D. Harkin (Republican) 31.4%
Indiana 2	Earl F. Landgrebe	Republican	1968	Incumbent lost re-election. Democratic gain.	✓ Floyd Fithian (Democratic) 61.1%; Earl F. Landgrebe (Republican) 38.9%
Indiana 3	John Brademas	Democratic	1958	Incumbent re-elected.	✓ John Brademas (Democratic) 64.1%; Virginia R. Black (Republican) 35.9%
Indiana 4	J. Edward Roush	Democratic	1958; 1968 (defeated); 1970	Incumbent re-elected.	✓ J. Edward Roush (Democratic) 51.9%; Walter P. Helmke (Republican) 46.5%; Donald L. Harris (American) 1.6%
Indiana 5	Elwood Hillis	Republican	1970	Incumbent re-elected.	✓ Elwood Hillis (Republican) 56.6%; William T. Sebree (Democratic) 43.4%
Indiana 6	William G. Bray	Republican	1950	Incumbent lost re-election. Democratic gain.	✓ David W. Evans (Democratic) 52.4%; William G. Bray (Republican) 47.6%
Indiana 7	John T. Myers	Republican	1966	Incumbent re-elected.	✓ John T. Myers (Republican) 57.1%; Eldon Creasy Tipton (Democratic) 42.1%; Harold P. Schlechtweg (Socialist Workers) 0.8%
Indiana 8	Roger H. Zion	Republican	1966	Incumbent lost re-election. Democratic gain.	✓ Philip H. Hayes (Democratic) 53.4%; Roger H. Zion (Republican) 46.6%
Indiana 9	Lee H. Hamilton	Democratic	1964	Incumbent re-elected.	✓ Lee H. Hamilton (Democratic) 71.1%; Delson Cox Jr. (Republican) 28.9%
Indiana 10	David W. Dennis	Republican	1968	Incumbent lost re-election. Democratic gain.	✓ Philip R. Sharp (Democratic) 54.4%; David W. Dennis (Republican) 45.6%
Indiana 11	William H. Hudnut III	Republican	1972	Incumbent lost re-election. Democratic gain.	✓ Andrew Jacobs Jr. (Democratic) 52.5%; William H. Hudnut III (Republican) 47.5%

== Iowa ==
District	Incumbent			This race	
District	Member	Party	First elected	Results	Candidates
Iowa 1	Edward Mezvinsky	Democratic	1972	Incumbent re-elected.	✓ Edward Mezvinsky (Democratic) 54.4%; Jim Leach (Republican) 45.6%
Iowa 2	John C. Culver	Democratic	1964	Incumbent retired to run for U.S. senator. Democratic hold.	✓ Mike Blouin (Democratic) 51.1%; Tom Riley (Republican) 48.1%; James W. Whitford (American) 0.8%
Iowa 3	H. R. Gross	Republican	1948	Incumbent retired. Republican hold.	✓ Chuck Grassley (Republican) 50.8%; Stephen J. Rapp (Democratic) 49.2%
Iowa 4	Neal Smith	Democratic	1958	Incumbent re-elected.	✓ Neal Smith (Democratic) 63.9%; Chuck Dick (Republican) 35.5%; Donna Le Porte (American) 0.6%
Iowa 5	William J. Scherle	Republican	1966	Incumbent lost re-election. Democratic gain.	✓ Tom Harkin (Democratic) 51.1%; William J. Scherle (Republican) 48.9%
Iowa 6	Wiley Mayne	Republican	1966	Incumbent lost re-election. Democratic gain.	✓ Berkley Bedell (Democratic) 54.6%; Wiley Mayne (Republican) 45.4%

== Kansas ==
District	Incumbent			This race	
District	Member	Party	First elected	Results	Candidates
Kansas 1	Keith Sebelius	Republican	1968	Incumbent re-elected.	✓ Keith Sebelius (Republican) 58.4%; Don Smith (Democratic) 33.0%; Thelma Morgan (American) 7.5%; Lorin P. Miller (Prohibition) 1.1%
Kansas 2	William R. Roy	Democratic	1970	Incumbent retired to run for U.S. senator. Democratic hold.	✓ Martha Keys (Democratic) 55.0%; John C. Peterson (Republican) 43.9%; David Scoggin (Prohibition) 1.1%
Kansas 3	Larry Winn	Republican	1966	Incumbent re-elected.	✓ Larry Winn (Republican) 62.9%; Samuel J. Wells (Democratic) 35.0%; Ted E. Oakes (American) 2.1%
Kansas 4	Garner E. Shriver	Republican	1960	Incumbent re-elected.	✓ Garner E. Shriver (Republican) 48.8%; Bert Chaney (Democratic) 42.5%; John S. Stevens (American) 8.7%
Kansas 5	Joe Skubitz	Republican	1962	Incumbent re-elected.	✓ Joe Skubitz (Republican) 55.2%; Frank Gaines (Democratic) 44.8%

== Kentucky ==
District	Incumbent			This race	
District	Member	Party	First elected	Results	Candidates
Kentucky 1	Frank Stubblefield	Democratic	1958	Incumbent lost renomination. Democratic hold.	✓ Carroll Hubbard (Democratic) 78.2%; Charles Thurman Banken Jr. (Republican) 18.7%; Robert W. Yoak (American) 3.1%
Kentucky 2	William Natcher	Democratic	1953 (Special)	Incumbent re-elected.	✓ William Natcher (Democratic) 73.0%; Art Eddleman (Republican) 23.7%; Leland Neville (American) 3.3%
Kentucky 3	Romano L. Mazzoli	Democratic	1970	Incumbent re-elected.	✓ Romano L. Mazzoli (Democratic) 69.7%; Vincent N. Barclay (Republican) 26.6%; William P. Chambers (American) 3.1%; Luther J. Wilson (Independent) 0.7%
Kentucky 4	Gene Snyder	Republican	1962; 1964 (defeated); 1966	Incumbent re-elected.	✓ Gene Snyder (Republican) 51.7%; Kyle T. Hubbard (Democratic) 48.3%
Kentucky 5	Tim Lee Carter	Republican	1964	Incumbent re-elected.	✓ Tim Lee Carter (Republican) 68.2%; Lyle L. Willis (Democratic) 29.3%; Albert G. J. Cullum (American) 2.5%
Kentucky 6	John B. Breckinridge	Democratic	1972	Incumbent re-elected.	✓ John B. Breckinridge (Democratic) 72.1%; Thomas F. Rogers III (Republican) 24.1%; Fred Kerestesy (American) 3.9%
Kentucky 7	Carl D. Perkins	Democratic	1948	Incumbent re-elected.	✓ Carl D. Perkins (Democratic) 75.6%; Granville Thomas (Republican) 24.4%

== Louisiana ==
District	Incumbent			This race	
District	Member	Party	First elected	Results	Candidates
Louisiana 1	F. Edward Hébert	Democratic	1940	Incumbent re-elected.	✓ F. Edward Hébert (Democratic); Unopposed
Louisiana 2	Lindy Boggs	Democratic	1973 (Special)	Incumbent re-elected.	✓ Lindy Boggs (Democratic) 81.8%; Diane Morphos (Republican) 14.6%; Jules W. "Ted" Hillery (Independent) 3.5%
Louisiana 3	Dave Treen	Republican	1972	Incumbent re-elected.	✓ Dave Treen (Republican) 58.5%; Charles Grisbaum Jr. (Democratic) 41.5%
Louisiana 4	Joe Waggonner	Democratic	1961 (Special)	Incumbent re-elected.	✓ Joe Waggonner (Democratic); Unopposed
Louisiana 5	Otto Passman	Democratic	1946	Incumbent re-elected.	✓ Otto Passman (Democratic); Unopposed
Louisiana 6	John Rarick	Democratic	1966	Incumbent lost renomination. Republican gain.	✓ Henson Moore (Republican) 54.1%; Jeff La Caze (Democratic) 45.9%
Louisiana 7	John Breaux	Democratic	1972	Incumbent re-elected.	✓ John Breaux (Democratic) 89.3%; Jeremy J. Millett (Independent) 10.7%
Louisiana 8	Gillis William Long	Democratic	1962; 1964 (lost renomination); 1972	Incumbent re-elected.	✓ Gillis William Long (Democratic); Unopposed

== Maine ==
District	Incumbent			This race	
District	Member	Party	First elected	Results	Candidates
Maine 1	Peter N. Kyros	Democratic	1966	Incumbent lost re-election. Republican gain.	✓ David F. Emery (Republican) 50.2%; Peter N. Kyros (Democratic) 49.8%
Maine 2	William Cohen	Republican	1972	Incumbent re-elected.	✓ William Cohen (Republican) 71.4%; Markham L. Gartley (Democratic) 28.6%

== Maryland ==
District	Incumbent			This race	
District	Member	Party	First elected	Results	Candidates
Maryland 1	Robert Bauman	Republican	1973 (Special)	Incumbent re-elected.	✓ Robert Bauman (Republican) 53.0%; Thomas J. Hatem (Democratic) 47.0%
Maryland 2	Clarence Long	Democratic	1962	Incumbent re-elected.	✓ Clarence Long (Democratic) 77.1%; John M. Seney (Republican) 22.9%
Maryland 3	Paul Sarbanes	Democratic	1970	Incumbent re-elected.	✓ Paul Sarbanes (Democratic) 83.8%; William H. Mathews (Republican) 16.2%
Maryland 4	Marjorie Holt	Republican	1972	Incumbent re-elected.	✓ Marjorie Holt (Republican) 58.1%; Fred L. Wineland (Democratic) 41.9%
Maryland 5	Lawrence Hogan	Republican	1968	Incumbent retired to run for governor of Maryland. Democratic gain.	✓ Gladys Spellman (Democratic) 52.6%; John B. Burcham Jr. (Republican) 47.4%
Maryland 6	Goodloe Byron	Democratic	1970	Incumbent re-elected.	✓ Goodloe Byron (Democratic) 73.7%; Elton R. Wampler (Republican) 26.3%
Maryland 7	Parren Mitchell	Democratic	1970	Incumbent re-elected.	✓ Parren Mitchell (Democratic); Unopposed
Maryland 8	Gilbert Gude	Republican	1966	Incumbent re-elected.	✓ Gilbert Gude (Republican) 65.9%; Sidney Kramer (Democratic) 34.1%

== Massachusetts ==
District	Incumbent			This race	
District	Member	Party	First elected	Results	Candidates
Massachusetts 1	Silvio Conte	Republican	1958	Incumbent re-elected.	✓ Silvio Conte (Republican) 71.1%; Thomas R. Manning (Democratic) 28.9%
Massachusetts 2	Edward Boland	Democratic	1952	Incumbent re-elected.	✓ Edward Boland (Democratic); Unopposed
Massachusetts 3	Harold Donohue	Democratic	1946	Incumbent retired. Democratic hold.	✓ Joseph D. Early (Democratic) 49.5%; David J. Lionett (Republican) 38.4%; Douglas J. Rowe (Independent) 12.0%
Massachusetts 4	Robert Drinan	Democratic	1970	Incumbent re-elected.	✓ Robert Drinan (Democratic) 50.8%; Jon Rotenberg (Independent) 34.7%; Alvin Mandell (Republican) 14.4%
Massachusetts 5	Paul W. Cronin	Republican	1972	Incumbent lost re-election. Democratic gain.	✓ Paul Tsongas (Democratic) 60.6%; Paul W. Cronin (Republican) 39.4%
Massachusetts 6	Michael J. Harrington	Democratic	1969 (Special)	Incumbent re-elected.	✓ Michael J. Harrington (Democratic); Unopposed
Massachusetts 7	Torbert H. MacDonald	Democratic	1954	Incumbent re-elected.	✓ Torbert H. MacDonald (Democratic) 79.8%; James J. Murphy (Independent) 20.2%
Massachusetts 8	Tip O'Neill	Democratic	1952	Incumbent re-elected.	✓ Tip O'Neill (Democratic) 87.9%; James H. Kiggen (Labor) 6.9%; Laura Ross (Communist) 5.3%
Massachusetts 9	Joe Moakley	Democratic	1972	Incumbent re-elected.	✓ Joe Moakley (Democratic) 89.3%; Laurence R. Sherman (Labor) 10.7%
Massachusetts 10	Margaret Heckler	Republican	1966	Incumbent re-elected.	✓ Margaret Heckler (Republican) 64.2%; Barry F. Monahan (Democratic) 35.8%
Massachusetts 11	James A. Burke	Democratic	1958	Incumbent re-elected.	✓ James A. Burke (Democratic); Unopposed
Massachusetts 12	Gerry E. Studds	Democratic	1972	Incumbent re-elected.	✓ Gerry E. Studds (Democratic) 74.8%; J. Alan Mackay (Republican) 25.2%

== Michigan ==
District	Incumbent			This race	
District	Member	Party	First elected	Results	Candidates
Michigan 1	John Conyers Jr.	Democratic	1964	Incumbent re-elected.	✓ John Conyers Jr. (Democratic) 90.7%; Walter F. Girardot (Republican) 8.7%; Hattie L. McCutcheon (Socialist Workers) 0.4%; Jacqueline M. Cotton (Labor) 0.2%
Michigan 2	Marvin L. Esch	Republican	1966	Incumbent re-elected.	✓ Marvin L. Esch (Republican) 52.3%; John S. Reuther (Democratic) 45.4%; Philip S. Carroll (Human Rights) 1.3%; Roy S. Jones (American Independent) 0.7%; Martha E. Pettit (Socialist Workers) 0.1%; Ronald G. Ziegler (Labor) 0.1%
Michigan 3	Garry E. Brown	Republican	1966	Incumbent re-elected.	✓ Garry E. Brown (Republican) 51.2%; Paul H. Todd Jr. (Democratic) 47.6%; Marvin P. Lightvoet (American Independent) 0.7%; Bryce F. Zender Jr. (Human Rights) 0.6%; Steve Beumer (Socialist Workers) 0.07%
Michigan 4	J. Edward Hutchinson	Republican	1962	Incumbent re-elected.	✓ J. Edward Hutchinson (Republican) 53.1%; Charles Jameson (Democratic) 45.5%; Harold Snyder (American Independent) 1.3%; Leslie E. Craine (Socialist Workers) 0.1%
Michigan 5	Richard F. Vander Veen	Democratic	1974	Incumbent re-elected.	✓ Richard F. Vander Veen (Democratic) 52.6%; Paul G. Goebel Jr. (Republican) 43.4%; Dwight W. Johnson (American Independent) 3.7%; Frank Girard (Socialist Labor) 0.1%; Ann Riley Owens (Socialist Workers) 0.1%
Michigan 6	Charles E. Chamberlain	Republican	1956	Incumbent retired. Democratic gain.	✓ Milton Robert Carr (Democratic) 49.3%; Clifford W. Taylor (Republican) 48.9%; Howard Jones (Human Rights) 1.4%; Margaret M. Hayes (Socialist Workers) 0.2%; Michael Ballard (Socialist Labor) 0.1%; Randolph A. Wedler (Labor) 0.06%
Michigan 7	Donald W. Riegle Jr.	Democratic	1966 (Note: Riegle was originally elected as a Republican. He switched parties in 1973.)	Incumbent re-elected.	✓ Donald W. Riegle Jr. (Democratic) 64.7%; Robert E. Eastman (Republican) 33.2%; Jimmy L. Sabin (American Independent) 1.0%; John P. Freeman (Human Rights) 0.8%; John F. Dicks (Labor) 0.1%; Sheila Ostrow (Socialist Workers) 0.1%
Michigan 8	J. Bob Traxler	Democratic	1974	Incumbent re-elected.	✓ J. Bob Traxler (Democratic) 54.8%; James M. Sparling Jr. (Republican) 43.4%; Mark Nelson (American Independent) 1.7%; Nicolee E. Brorsen (Socialist Workers) 0.06%
Michigan 9	Guy Vander Jagt	Republican	1966	Incumbent re-elected.	✓ Guy Vander Jagt (Republican) 56.6%; Norman Halbower (Democratic) 42.1%; Craig R. Kessler (American Independent) 1.1%; Connie Allen (Socialist Workers) 0.2%
Michigan 10	Elford Albin Cederberg	Republican	1952	Incumbent re-elected.	✓ Elford Albin Cederberg (Republican) 52.5%; Samuel D. Marble (Democratic) 47.1%; Kathryn Ropert (Socialist Workers) 0.4%
Michigan 11	Philip Ruppe	Republican	1966	Incumbent re-elected.	✓ Philip Ruppe (Republican) 50.9%; Francis D. Brouillette (Democratic) 48.8%; Theodore G. Albert (Human Rights) 0.2%; Brian Elam (Socialist Workers) 0.05%
Michigan 12	James G. O'Hara	Democratic	1958	Incumbent re-elected.	✓ James G. O'Hara (Democratic) 72.2%; Eugene J. Tyza (Republican) 27.6%; Richard Orawiec (Socialist Workers) 0.2%
Michigan 13	Charles Diggs	Democratic	1954	Incumbent re-elected.	✓ Charles Diggs (Democratic) 87.4%; George E. McCall (Republican) 11.1%; Judith Hagans (Socialist Workers) 1.1%; Percy Ray Wheeler (American Labor) 0.4%
Michigan 14	Lucien Nedzi	Democratic	1961 (Special)	Incumbent re-elected.	✓ Lucien Nedzi (Democratic) 71.2%; Herbert O. Steiger (Republican) 27.1%; Leonard J. Lukomski (American Independent) 1.3%; Mark Severs (Socialist Workers) 0.2%; Joseph A. Spaniolo (Labor) 0.1%
Michigan 15	William D. Ford	Democratic	1964	Incumbent re-elected.	✓ William D. Ford (Democratic) 78.1%; Jack A. Underwood (Republican) 20.8%; Aldi C. Fuhrmann (American Independent) 0.9%; James R. Eades (Labor) 0.1%; Claytee O. Artz (Socialist Workers) 0.1%
Michigan 16	John D. Dingell Jr.	Democratic	1955 (Special)	Incumbent re-elected.	✓ John D. Dingell Jr. (Democratic) 77.7%; Wallace D. English (Republican) 20.5%; Virginia Crawford (American Independent) 1.3%; Donald A. Bechler (Socialist Workers) 0.3%; Lewis Steinhardt (Labor) 0.2%
Michigan 17	Martha W. Griffiths	Democratic	1954	Incumbent retired. Democratic hold.	✓ William M. Brodhead (Democratic) 69.5%; Kenneth C. Gallagher (Republican) 29.4%; Bruce E. Duke (American Independent) 0.8%; Christy L. Wallace (Socialist Workers) 0.3%; Harry Jock (Labor) 0.07%
Michigan 18	Robert J. Huber	Republican	1972	Incumbent lost re-election. Democratic gain.	✓ James J. Blanchard (Democratic) 59.0%; Robert J. Huber (Republican) 40.4%; James Gordon Lott (American Independent) 0.4%; Sandra L. Peck (Socialist Workers) 0.2%
Michigan 19	William Broomfield	Republican	1956	Incumbent re-elected.	✓ William Broomfield (Republican) 62.6%; George Montgomery (Democratic) 36.7%; Maurice Geary (Human Rights) 0.4%; Rudolf Zeller (Socialist Workers) 0.1%; James Jaber (Labor) 0.08%; Matthew Moriarty (Labor) 0.07%

== Minnesota ==
District	Incumbent			This race	
District	Member	Party	First elected	Results	Candidates
Minnesota 1	Al Quie	Republican	1958	Incumbent re-elected.	✓ Al Quie (Republican) 62.6%; Ulric Scott (Democratic (DFL)) 37.4%
Minnesota 2	Ancher Nelsen	Republican	1958	Incumbent retired. Republican hold.	✓ Tom Hagedorn (Republican) 53.1%; Steve Babcock (Democratic (DFL)) 46.9%
Minnesota 3	Bill Frenzel	Republican	1970	Incumbent re-elected.	✓ Bill Frenzel (Republican) 60.4%; Bob Riggs (Democratic (DFL)) 39.6%
Minnesota 4	Joseph Karth	Democratic (DFL)	1958	Incumbent re-elected.	✓ Joseph Karth (Democratic (DFL)) 76.0%; Joseph A. Rheinberger (Republican) 24.0%
Minnesota 5	Donald M. Fraser	Democratic (DFL)	1962	Incumbent re-elected.	✓ Donald M. Fraser (Democratic (DFL)) 73.8%; Phil Ratte (Republican) 24.7%; Edmund A. Jurenas (Socialist Workers) 1.5%
Minnesota 6	John Zwach	Republican	1966	Incumbent retired. Democratic (DFL) gain.	✓ Richard Nolan (Democratic (DFL)) 55.4%; Jon Grunseth (Republican) 44.6%
Minnesota 7	Bob Bergland	Democratic (DFL)	1970	Incumbent re-elected.	✓ Bob Bergland (Democratic (DFL)) 75.0%; Dan Reber (Republican) 25.0%
Minnesota 8	John Blatnik	Democratic (DFL)	1946	Incumbent retired. Democratic hold.	✓ Jim Oberstar (Democratic (DFL)) 62.0%; Jerome Arnold (Republican) 26.2%; William R. Ojala (Justice) 10.0%; Robert C. Bester (Independent) 1.8%

== Mississippi ==
District	Incumbent			This race	
District	Member	Party	First elected	Results	Candidates
Mississippi 1	Jamie Whitten	Democratic	1941 (Special)	Incumbent re-elected.	✓ Jamie Whitten (Democratic) 88.2%; Jack Benney (Independent) 11.8%
Mississippi 2	David R. Bowen	Democratic	1972	Incumbent re-elected.	✓ David R. Bowen (Democratic) 66.1%; Ben F. Hilbun Jr. (Republican) 27.7%; H. B. Wells (Independent) 6.2%
Mississippi 3	Gillespie V. Montgomery	Democratic	1966	Incumbent re-elected.	✓ Gillespie V. Montgomery (Democratic); Unopposed
Mississippi 4	Thad Cochran	Republican	1972	Incumbent re-elected.	✓ Thad Cochran (Republican) 70.2%; Kenneth L. Dean (Democratic) 28.8%; Leonard R. Young (Independent) 1.0%
Mississippi 5	Trent Lott	Republican	1972	Incumbent re-elected.	✓ Trent Lott (Republican) 73.0%; Walter Wilson Murphey (Democratic) 14.4%; Karl Mertz (Independent) 8.9%; Glenn E. Gilley (Independent) 2.7%; Earnest J. Creel (Independent) 1.0%

== Missouri ==
District	Incumbent			This race	
District	Member	Party	First elected	Results	Candidates
Missouri 1	Bill Clay	Democratic	1968	Incumbent re-elected.	✓ Bill Clay (Democratic) 68.3%; Arthur O. Martin (Republican) 31.7%
Missouri 2	James W. Symington	Democratic	1968	Incumbent re-elected.	✓ James W. Symington (Democratic) 61.0%; Howard C. Ohlendorf (Republican) 39.0%
Missouri 3	Leonor Sullivan	Democratic	1952	Incumbent re-elected.	✓ Leonor Sullivan (Democratic) 74.3%; Jo Ann P. Raisch (Republican) 24.3%; Marie S. Nowak (Independent) 1.4%
Missouri 4	William J. Randall	Democratic	1959 (Special)	Incumbent re-elected.	✓ William J. Randall (Democratic) 67.9%; Claude Patterson (Republican) 32.1%
Missouri 5	Richard Bolling	Democratic	1948	Incumbent re-elected.	✓ Richard Bolling (Democratic) 69.1%; John McDonough (Republican) 29.9%; Edward Verburg (Independent) 1.0%
Missouri 6	Jerry Litton	Democratic	1972	Incumbent re-elected.	✓ Jerry Litton (Democratic) 78.9%; Grover H. Speers (Republican) 21.1%
Missouri 7	Gene Taylor	Republican	1972	Incumbent re-elected.	✓ Gene Taylor (Republican) 52.3%; Richard L. Franks (Democratic) 47.7%
Missouri 8	Richard Howard Ichord Jr.	Democratic	1960	Incumbent re-elected.	✓ Richard Howard Ichord Jr. (Democratic) 69.9%; James A. Noland Jr. (Republican) 30.1%
Missouri 9	William L. Hungate	Democratic	1964	Incumbent re-elected.	✓ William L. Hungate (Democratic) 66.4%; Milton Bischof Jr. (Republican) 33.6%
Missouri 10	Bill Burlison	Democratic	1968	Incumbent re-elected.	✓ Bill Burlison (Democratic) 72.8%; Truman Farrow (Republican) 27.2%

== Montana ==
District	Incumbent			This race	
District	Member	Party	First elected	Results	Candidates
Montana 1	Richard G. Shoup	Republican	1970	Incumbent lost re-election. Democratic gain.	✓ Max Baucus (Democratic) 54.8%; Richard G. Shoup (Republican) 45.2%
Montana 2	John Melcher	Democratic	1969 (Special)	Incumbent re-elected.	✓ John Melcher (Democratic) 63.0%; Jack McDonald (Republican) 37.0%

== Nebraska ==
District	Incumbent			This race	
District	Member	Party	First elected	Results	Candidates
Nebraska 1	Charles Thone	Republican	1970	Incumbent re-elected.	✓ Charles Thone (Republican) 53.3%; Hess Dyas (Democratic) 46.7%
Nebraska 2	John Y. McCollister	Republican	1970	Incumbent re-elected.	✓ John Y. McCollister (Republican) 55.2%; Daniel C. Lynch (Democratic) 44.8%
Nebraska 3	David T. Martin	Republican	1960	Incumbent retired. Republican hold.	✓ Virginia D. Smith (Republican) 50.2%; Wayne W. Ziebarth (Democratic) 49.8%

== Nevada ==
District	Incumbent			This race	
District	Member	Party	First elected	Results	Candidates
Nevada at-large	David Towell	Republican	1972	Incumbent lost re-election. Democratic gain.	✓ James David Santini (Democratic) 55.8%; David Towell (Republican) 36.4%; Joel F. Hansen (Independent) 7.8%

== New Hampshire ==
District	Incumbent			This race	
District	Member	Party	First elected	Results	Candidates
New Hampshire 1	Louis C. Wyman	Republican	1962; 1964 (defeated); 1966	Incumbent retired to run for U.S. senator. Democratic gain.	✓ Norman D'Amours (Democratic) 52.1%; David A. Banks (Republican) 47.9%
New Hampshire 2	James Colgate Cleveland	Republican	1962	Incumbent re-elected.	✓ James Colgate Cleveland (Republican) 64.2%; Helen L. Bliss (Democratic) 35.8%

== New Jersey ==
District	Incumbent			This race	
District	Member	Party	First elected	Results	Candidates
New Jersey 1	John E. Hunt	Republican	1966	Incumbent lost re-election. Democratic gain.	✓ James J. Florio (Democratic) 57.5%; John E. Hunt (Republican) 38.5%; James Perry (Independent) 2.3%; Bradley L. Kirsch (Independent) 0.6%; Elizabeth L. Drevs (Independent) 0.5%; Raymond Carotenuto (Independent) 0.3%; Julius Levin (Socialist Labor) 0.2%; Pedro J. Torres (Independent) 0.1%
New Jersey 2	Charles W. Sandman Jr.	Republican	1966	Incumbent lost re-election. Democratic gain.	✓ William J. Hughes (Democratic) 57.3%; Charles W. Sandman Jr. (Republican) 41.3%; Andrew Wender (Independent) 1.4%
New Jersey 3	James J. Howard	Democratic	1964	Incumbent re-elected.	✓ James J. Howard (Democratic) 68.9%; Kenneth W. Clark (Republican) 29.8%; Joseph A. Rogers (Independent) 0.8%; Thomas W. Palven (Independent) 0.5%
New Jersey 4	Frank Thompson	Democratic	1954	Incumbent re-elected.	✓ Frank Thompson (Democratic) 66.8%; Henry J. Keller (Republican) 33.2%
New Jersey 5	Peter Frelinghuysen Jr.	Republican	1952	Incumbent retired. Republican hold.	✓ Millicent Fenwick (Republican) 53.4%; Frederick M. Bohen (Democratic) 43.5%; John Giammarco (American Independent) 2.0%; Leonard F. Newton (Independent) 1.2%
New Jersey 6	Edwin B. Forsythe	Republican	1970	Incumbent re-elected.	✓ Edwin B. Forsythe (Republican) 52.5%; Charles B. Yates (Democratic) 45.5%; John V. Mahalchik (Independent) 0.9%; Bernardo S. Doganiero (Socialist Labor) 0.7%; Joseph Alfons Nowak (Christian) 0.4%
New Jersey 7	William B. Widnall	Republican	1950	Incumbent lost re-election. Democratic gain.	✓ Andrew Maguire (Democratic) 49.7%; William B. Widnall (Republican) 44.4%; Milton Gralla (Independent) 5.9%
New Jersey 8	Robert A. Roe	Democratic	1970	Incumbent re-elected.	✓ Robert A. Roe (Democratic) 73.9%; Herman Schmidt (Republican) 24.6%; Kenneth Kowalczyk (Socialist Labor) 1.6%
New Jersey 9	Henry Helstoski	Democratic	1964	Incumbent re-elected.	✓ Henry Helstoski (Democratic) 64.5%; Harold A. Pareti (Republican) 32.9%; Herbert H. Shaw (Independent) 2.2%; Robert W. Funsch (Independent) 0.3%
New Jersey 10	Peter W. Rodino	Democratic	1948	Incumbent re-elected.	✓ Peter W. Rodino (Democratic) 81.0%; John R. Taliferro (Republican) 15.2%; Sandra Hill (Independent) 3.8%
New Jersey 11	Joseph G. Minish	Democratic	1962	Incumbent re-elected.	✓ Joseph G. Minish (Democratic) 69.2%; William B. Grant (Republican) 29.4%; Robert Clement (Socialist Labor) 1.3%
New Jersey 12	Matthew John Rinaldo	Republican	1972	Incumbent re-elected.	✓ Matthew John Rinaldo (Republican) 65.0%; Adam K. Levin (Democratic) 32.4%; Anthony Carbone (Independent) 1.1%; Catherine O'Toole French (Independent) 0.8%; Robert A. Steiner (Independent) 0.7%
New Jersey 13	Joseph J. Maraziti	Republican	1972	Incumbent lost re-election. Democratic gain.	✓ Helen Stevenson Meyner (Democratic) 57.3%; Joseph J. Maraziti (Republican) 42.7%
New Jersey 14	Dominick V. Daniels	Democratic	1958	Incumbent re-elected.	✓ Dominick V. Daniels (Democratic) 79.9%; Claire J. Sheridan (Republican) 16.1%; John A. Alston (Independent) 4.0%
New Jersey 15	Edward J. Patten	Democratic	1962	Incumbent re-elected.	✓ Edward J. Patten (Democratic) 71.0%; Ernest J. Hammesfahr (Republican) 27.5%; Paul M. Schiff (Communist) 1.5%

== New Mexico ==
District	Incumbent			This race	
District	Member	Party	First elected	Results	Candidates
New Mexico 1	Manuel Lujan Jr.	Republican	1968	Incumbent re-elected.	✓ Manuel Lujan Jr. (Republican) 58.6%; Roberto A. Mondragón (Democratic) 39.7%; Martin Molloy (American Independent) 1.7%
New Mexico 2	Harold L. Runnels	Democratic	1970	Incumbent re-elected.	✓ Harold L. Runnels (Democratic) 66.7%; Donald W. Trubey (Republican) 31.9%; Herbert "Hub" Horton (American Independent) 1.4%

== New York ==
District	Incumbent			This race	
District	Member	Party	First elected	Results	Candidates
New York 1	Otis G. Pike	Democratic	1960	Incumbent re-elected.	✓ Otis G. Pike (Democratic) 65.0%; Donald R. Sallah (Republican) 28.6%; Seth Morgan (Conservative) 6.4%
New York 2	James R. Grover Jr.	Republican	1962	Incumbent lost re-election. Democratic gain.	✓ Thomas J. Downey (Democratic) 48.8%; James R. Grover Jr. (Republican) 44.7%; Neil Greene (Conservative) 6.5%
New York 3	Angelo D. Roncallo	Republican	1972	Incumbent lost re-election. Democratic gain.	✓ Jerome Ambro (Democratic) 51.8%; Angelo D. Roncallo (Republican) 46.1%; Arthur Hoffer (Liberal) 2.2%
New York 4	Norman F. Lent	Republican	1970	Incumbent re-elected.	✓ Norman F. Lent (Republican) 56.3%; Franklin Ornstein (Democratic) 43.7%
New York 5	John W. Wydler	Republican	1962	Incumbent re-elected.	✓ John W. Wydler (Republican) 57.1%; Allard K. Lowenstein (Democratic) 42.9%
New York 6	Lester L. Wolff	Democratic	1964	Incumbent re-elected.	✓ Lester L. Wolff (Democratic) 61.0%; Edythe Layne (Republican) 39.0%
New York 7	Joseph P. Addabbo	Democratic	1960	Incumbent re-elected.	✓ Joseph P. Addabbo (Democratic); Unopposed
New York 8	Benjamin Stanley Rosenthal	Democratic	1962	Incumbent re-elected.	✓ Benjamin Stanley Rosenthal (Democratic) 68.8%; Albert Lemishow (Republican) 31.2%
New York 9	James J. Delaney	Democratic	1944; 1946 (defeated); 1948	Incumbent re-elected.	✓ James J. Delaney (Democratic) 93.0%; Theodore E. Garrison (Liberal) 7.0%
New York 10	Mario Biaggi	Democratic	1968	Incumbent re-elected.	✓ Mario Biaggi (Democratic) 82.4%; Francis L. McHugh (Conservative) 11.2%; Michael S. Bank (Liberal) 6.3%
New York 11	Frank J. Brasco	Democratic	1966	Incumbent retired. Democratic hold.	✓ James H. Scheuer (Democratic) 72.2%; Edward G. Desborough (Republican) 14.2%; Christopher T. Acer (Conservative) 8.3%; Tibby Blum (Liberal) 5.2%
New York 12	Shirley Chisholm	Democratic	1968	Incumbent re-elected.	✓ Shirley Chisholm (Democratic) 80.2%; Francis J. Voyticky (Republican) 13.9%; Martin S. Shepherd Jr. (Conservative) 4.6%; Teresa Delgado (Socialist Labor) 0.9%; Maxine Williams (Socialist Workers) 0.4%
New York 13	Bertram L. Podell	Democratic	1968	Incumbent lost renomination. Democratic hold.	✓ Stephen J. Solarz (Democratic) 81.8%; Jack N. Dobosh (Republican) 18.2%
New York 14	John J. Rooney	Democratic	1944	Incumbent retired. Democratic hold.	✓ Fred Richmond (Democratic) 71.3%; Donald H. Elliott (Liberal) 13.3%; Michael Carbajal Jr. (Republican) 11.5%; Alexander W. Nojovits (Conservative) 3.1%; Helen Halyard (Socialist Workers) 0.8%
New York 15	Hugh L. Carey	Democratic	1960	Incumbent retired to run for governor of New York. Democratic hold.	✓ Leo C. Zeferetti (Democratic) 49.9%; Austen D. Canade (Republican) 37.9%; Herbert M. Feinsod (Liberal) 12.2%
New York 16	Elizabeth Holtzman	Democratic	1972	Incumbent re-elected.	✓ Elizabeth Holtzman (Democratic) 78.9%; Joseph L. Gentili (Republican) 21.1%
New York 17	John M. Murphy	Democratic	1962	Incumbent re-elected.	✓ John M. Murphy (Democratic) 57.7%; Frank J. Biondolillo (Republican) 25.6%; Jerome Kretchmer (Liberal) 9.6%; Michael Ajello (Conservative) 7.1%
New York 18	Ed Koch	Democratic	1968	Incumbent re-elected.	✓ Ed Koch (Democratic) 76.7%; John Boogaerts Jr. (Republican) 18.8%; Gilliam M. Drummond (Conservative) 3.7%; Katherine Sojourner (Socialist Workers) 0.8%
New York 19	Charles B. Rangel	Democratic	1970	Incumbent re-elected.	✓ Charles B. Rangel (Democratic) 96.9%; Charles G. Mills IV (Conservative) 3.1%
New York 20	Bella Abzug	Democratic	1970	Incumbent re-elected.	✓ Bella Abzug (Democratic) 78.7%; Stephen Posner (Republican) 15.6%; Timothy A. Mitchell (Conservative) 4.9%; Christiana A. Nelson (Socialist Labor) 0.4%; Claire Moriarty (Socialist Workers) 0.4%
New York 21	Herman Badillo	Democratic	1970	Incumbent re-elected.	✓ Herman Badillo (Democratic) 96.7%; Mary C. Lynch (Conservative) 3.3%
New York 22	Jonathan Brewster Bingham	Democratic	1964	Incumbent re-elected.	✓ Jonathan Brewster Bingham (Democratic) 76.6%; John DiGiovanni (Conservative) 14.4%; Robert Black (Republican) 9.0%
New York 23	Peter A. Peyser	Republican	1970	Incumbent re-elected.	✓ Peter A. Peyser (Republican) 57.6%; William S. Greenawalt (Democratic) 42.4%
New York 24	Ogden R. Reid	Democratic	1962 (Note: Reid was originally elected as a Republican. He switched parties in 1972.)	Incumbent retired to run for governor of New York. Democratic hold.	✓ Richard Ottinger (Democratic) 57.8%; Charles Stephens (Republican) 42.2%
New York 25	Hamilton Fish IV	Republican	1968	Incumbent re-elected.	✓ Hamilton Fish IV (Republican) 65.3%; Nicholas Angell (Democratic) 33.6%; Sanford P. Cohen (Liberal) 1.2%
New York 26	Benjamin A. Gilman	Republican	1972	Incumbent re-elected.	✓ Benjamin A. Gilman (Republican) 54.0%; John G. Dow (Democratic) 38.5%; Thomas Moore (Conservative) 7.5%
New York 27	Howard W. Robison	Republican	1958	Incumbent retired. Democratic gain.	✓ Matthew F. McHugh (Democratic) 52.8%; Alfred J. Libous (Republican) 43.1%; Franklin B. Resseguie (Conservative) 4.1%
New York 28	Samuel S. Stratton	Democratic	1958	Incumbent re-elected.	✓ Samuel S. Stratton (Democratic) 80.6%; Wayne E. Wagner (Republican) 17.3%; Edward Breitenbach (Conservative) 2.1%
New York 29	Carleton J. King	Republican	1960	Incumbent lost re-election. Democratic gain.	✓ Edward W. Pattison (Democratic) 54.2%; Carleton J. King (Republican) 45.8%
New York 30	Robert C. McEwen	Republican	1964	Incumbent re-elected.	✓ Robert C. McEwen (Republican) 55.0%; Roger W. Tubby (Democratic) 45.0%
New York 31	Donald J. Mitchell	Republican	1972	Incumbent re-elected.	✓ Donald J. Mitchell (Republican) 59.6%; Donald J. Reile (Democratic) 37.7%; Theodore L. Tolles (Liberal) 2.7%
New York 32	James M. Hanley	Democratic	1964	Incumbent re-elected.	✓ James M. Hanley (Democratic) 59.1%; William E. Bush (Republican) 40.9%
New York 33	William F. Walsh	Republican	1972	Incumbent re-elected.	✓ William F. Walsh (Republican) 65.3%; Robert H. Bockman (Democratic) 30.2%; Francis H. Aspinwall (Conservative) 3.3%; Bessie C. Noble (Liberal) 1.2%
New York 34	Frank Horton	Republican	1962	Incumbent re-elected.	✓ Frank Horton (Republican) 67.5%; Irene Gossin (Democratic) 29.0%; J. Warren McGee (Conservative) 2.8%; Virginia Tadio (Liberal) 0.7%
New York 35	Barber Conable	Republican	1964	Incumbent re-elected.	✓ Barber Conable (Republican) 56.8%; Margaret Costanza (Democratic) 39.6%; Clarence E. Carman Jr. (Conservative) 2.9%; David L. MacAdam (Liberal) 0.7%
New York 36	Henry P. Smith III	Republican	1964	Incumbent retired. Democratic gain.	✓ John J. LaFalce (Democratic) 59.6%; Russell A. Rourke (Republican) 40.4%
New York 37	Thaddeus J. Dulski	Democratic	1958	Incumbent retired. Democratic hold.	✓ Henry J. Nowak (Democratic) 75.0%; Joseph R. Bala (Republican) 24.6%; Ira Liebowitz (Socialist Labor) 0.5%
New York 38	Jack Kemp	Republican	1970	Incumbent re-elected.	✓ Jack Kemp (Republican) 72.1%; Barbara C. Wicks (Democratic) 27.9%
New York 39	James F. Hastings	Republican	1968	Incumbent re-elected.	✓ James F. Hastings (Republican) 60.2%; William L. Parment (Democratic) 37.1%; Joseph V. Damiano (Conservative) 2.6%

== North Carolina ==
District	Incumbent			This race	
District	Member	Party	First elected	Results	Candidates
North Carolina 1	Walter B. Jones Sr.	Democratic	1966	Incumbent re-elected.	✓ Walter B. Jones Sr. (Democratic) 77.5%; Harry McMullan (Republican) 22.5%
North Carolina 2	Lawrence H. Fountain	Democratic	1952	Incumbent re-elected.	✓ Lawrence H. Fountain (Democratic); Unopposed
North Carolina 3	David N. Henderson	Democratic	1960	Incumbent re-elected.	✓ David N. Henderson (Democratic); Unopposed
North Carolina 4	Ike Franklin Andrews	Democratic	1972	Incumbent re-elected.	✓ Ike Franklin Andrews (Democratic) 64.7%; Ward Purrington (Republican) 34.6%; Michael Henderson Smedberg (Socialist Labor) 0.7%
North Carolina 5	Wilmer Mizell	Republican	1968	Incumbent lost re-election. Democratic gain.	✓ Stephen L. Neal (Democratic) 52.0%; Wilmer Mizell (Republican) 47.6%; Lauren Eugene Brubaker (Socialist Labor) 0.3%
North Carolina 6	L. Richardson Preyer	Democratic	1968	Incumbent re-elected.	✓ L. Richardson Preyer (Democratic) 63.7%; R. S. "Steve" Ritchie (Republican) 35.9%; Harry Allen Frigg (Socialist Labor) 0.4%
North Carolina 7	Charlie Rose	Democratic	1972	Incumbent re-elected.	✓ Charlie Rose (Democratic); Unopposed
North Carolina 8	Earl B. Ruth	Republican	1968	Incumbent lost re-election. Democratic gain.	✓ Bill Hefner (Democratic) 57.0%; Earl B. Ruth (Republican) 43.0%
North Carolina 9	James G. Martin	Republican	1972	Incumbent re-elected.	✓ James G. Martin (Republican) 54.4%; Milton Short (Democratic) 44.1%; Geoffrey Michael Hooks (Socialist Labor) 1.6%
North Carolina 10	James T. Broyhill	Republican	1962	Incumbent re-elected.	✓ James T. Broyhill (Republican) 54.4%; Jack L. Rhyne (Democratic) 45.6%
North Carolina 11	Roy A. Taylor	Democratic	1960	Incumbent re-elected.	✓ Roy A. Taylor (Democratic) 66.0%; Albert F. "Doc" Gilman (Republican) 34.0%

== North Dakota ==
District	Incumbent			This race	
District	Member	Party	First elected	Results	Candidates
North Dakota at-large	Mark Andrews	Republican	1963 (Special)	Incumbent re-elected.	✓ Mark Andrews (Republican) 55.7%; Byron Dorgan (Democratic) 44.3%

== Ohio ==
District	Incumbent			This race	
District	Member	Party	First elected	Results	Candidates
Ohio 1	Tom Luken	Democratic	1974 (Special)	Incumbent lost re-election. Republican gain.	✓ Bill Gradison (Republican) 50.9%; Tom Luken (Democratic) 49.1%
Ohio 2	Donald D. Clancy	Republican	1960	Incumbent re-elected.	✓ Donald D. Clancy (Republican) 53.4%; Edward W. Wolterman (Democratic) 46.6%
Ohio 3	Charles W. Whalen Jr.	Republican	1966	Incumbent re-elected.	✓ Charles W. Whalen Jr. (Republican); Unopposed
Ohio 4	Tennyson Guyer	Republican	1972	Incumbent re-elected.	✓ Tennyson Guyer (Republican) 61.5%; James L. Gehrlich (Democratic) 38.5%
Ohio 5	Del Latta	Republican	1958	Incumbent re-elected.	✓ Del Latta (Republican) 62.5%; Bruce Edwards (Democratic) 37.5%
Ohio 6	Bill Harsha	Republican	1960	Incumbent re-elected.	✓ Bill Harsha (Republican) 68.8%; Lloyd Allan Wood (Democratic) 31.2%
Ohio 7	Bud Brown	Republican	1965 (Special)	Incumbent re-elected.	✓ Bud Brown (Republican) 60.5%; Patrick L. Nelson (Democratic) 28.7%; Dorothy Franke (Independent) 10.8%
Ohio 8	Walter E. Powell	Republican	1970	Incumbent retired. Republican hold.	✓ Tom Kindness (Republican) 42.4%; T. Edward Strinko (Democratic) 38.0%; Don Gingerich (Independent) 19.6%
Ohio 9	Thomas L. Ashley	Democratic	1954	Incumbent re-elected.	✓ Thomas L. Ashley (Democratic) 52.8%; Carleton S. Finkbeiner Jr. (Republican) 47.2%
Ohio 10	Clarence E. Miller	Republican	1966	Incumbent re-elected.	✓ Clarence E. Miller (Republican) 70.4%; H. Kent Bumpass (Democratic) 29.6%
Ohio 11	J. William Stanton	Republican	1964	Incumbent re-elected.	✓ J. William Stanton (Republican) 60.5%; Michael D. Coffey (Democratic) 39.5%
Ohio 12	Samuel L. Devine	Republican	1958	Incumbent re-elected.	✓ Samuel L. Devine (Republican) 50.9%; Fran Ryan (Democratic) 49.1%
Ohio 13	Charles Adams Mosher	Republican	1960	Incumbent re-elected.	✓ Charles Adams Mosher (Republican) 57.5%; Fred M. Ritenauer (Democratic) 42.5%
Ohio 14	John F. Seiberling	Democratic	1970	Incumbent re-elected.	✓ John F. Seiberling (Democratic) 75.4%; Mark Figetakis (Republican) 24.6%
Ohio 15	Chalmers P. Wylie	Republican	1966	Incumbent re-elected.	✓ Chalmers P. Wylie (Republican) 61.5%; Manley L. McGee (Republican) 38.5%
Ohio 16	Ralph Regula	Republican	1972	Incumbent re-elected.	✓ Ralph Regula (Republican) 65.6%; John G. Freedom (Democratic) 34.4%
Ohio 17	John M. Ashbrook	Republican	1960	Incumbent re-elected.	✓ John M. Ashbrook (Republican) 52.7%; David D. Noble (Democratic) 47.3%; Clifford J. Simpson (Independent) 0.002%
Ohio 18	Wayne L. Hays	Democratic	1948	Incumbent re-elected.	✓ Wayne L. Hays (Democratic) 65.6%; Ralph H. Romig (Republican) 34.4%
Ohio 19	Charles J. Carney	Democratic	1970	Incumbent re-elected.	✓ Charles J. Carney (Democratic) 72.7%; James L. Ripple (Republican) 27.3%
Ohio 20	James V. Stanton	Democratic	1970	Incumbent re-elected.	✓ James V. Stanton (Democratic) 86.9%; Robert A. Frantz (Republican) 13.1%
Ohio 21	Louis Stokes	Democratic	1968	Incumbent re-elected.	✓ Louis Stokes (Democratic) 82.0%; Bill Mack (Republican) 18.0%
Ohio 22	Charles Vanik	Democratic	1954	Incumbent re-elected.	✓ Charles Vanik (Democratic) 78.7%; William J. Franz (Republican) 21.3%
Ohio 23	William Edwin Minshall Jr.	Republican	1954	Incumbent retired. Democratic gain.	✓ Ronald M. Mottl (Democratic) 34.8%; George E. Mastics (Republican) 30.5%; Dennis J. Kucinich (Independent) 29.4%; Hugh J. Gallagher (Independent) 2.3%; Bohdan A. Futey (Independent) 1.7%; Arthur L. Cain (Independent) 1.3%

== Oklahoma ==
District	Incumbent			This race	
District	Member	Party	First elected	Results	Candidates
Oklahoma 1	James R. Jones	Democratic	1972	Incumbent re-elected.	✓ James R. Jones (Democratic) 67.9%; George Alfred Mizer Jr. (Republican) 32.1%
Oklahoma 2	Clem McSpadden	Democratic	1972	Incumbent retired to run for governor of Oklahoma. Democratic hold.	✓ Ted Risenhoover (Democratic) 59.1%; Ralph F. Keen (Republican) 40.9%
Oklahoma 3	Carl Albert	Democratic	1946	Incumbent re-elected.	✓ Carl Albert (Democratic); Unopposed
Oklahoma 4	Tom Steed	Democratic	1948	Incumbent re-elected.	✓ Tom Steed (Democratic); Unopposed
Oklahoma 5	John Jarman	Democratic	1950	Incumbent re-elected.	✓ John Jarman (Democratic) 51.7%; Mickey Edwards (Republican) 48.3%
Oklahoma 6	John Newbold Camp	Republican	1968	Incumbent lost re-election. Democratic gain.	✓ Glenn English (Democratic) 53.2%; John Newbold Camp (Republican) 44.4%; Bennett L. Basore (Independent) 2.3%

== Oregon ==
District	Incumbent			This race	
District	Member	Party	First elected	Results	Candidates
Oregon 1	Wendell Wyatt	Republican	1964	Incumbent retired. Democratic gain.	✓ Les AuCoin (Democratic) 56.1%; Diarmuid O'Scannlain (Republican) 43.9%
Oregon 2	Albert C. Ullman	Democratic	1956	Incumbent re-elected.	✓ Albert C. Ullman (Democratic) 78.1%; Kenneth Brown (Republican) 21.9%
Oregon 3	Edith Green	Democratic	1954	Incumbent retired. Democratic hold.	✓ Robert B. Duncan (Democratic) 70.5%; John Piacentini (Republican) 29.5%
Oregon 4	John R. Dellenback	Republican	1966	Incumbent lost re-election. Democratic gain.	✓ Jim Weaver (Democratic) 52.9%; John R. Dellenback (Republican) 47.1%

== Pennsylvania ==
District	Incumbent			This race	
District	Member	Party	First elected	Results	Candidates
Pennsylvania 1	William A. Barrett	Democratic	1944; 1946 (defeated); 1948	Incumbent re-elected.	✓ William A. Barrett (Democratic) 75.8%; Russel M. Nigro (Republican) 23.3%; Bernard Salera (Socialist Labor) 0.9%
Pennsylvania 2	Robert N. C. Nix Sr.	Democratic	1958	Incumbent re-elected.	✓ Robert N. C. Nix Sr. (Democratic) 74.0%; Jesse W. Woods Jr. (Republican) 26.0%
Pennsylvania 3	William J. Green III	Democratic	1964	Incumbent re-elected.	✓ William J. Green III (Democratic) 75.4%; Richard P. Colbert (Republican) 24.6%
Pennsylvania 4	Joshua Eilberg	Democratic	1966	Incumbent re-elected.	✓ Joshua Eilberg (Democratic) 71.0%; Isadore Einhorn (Republican) 29.0%
Pennsylvania 5	John H. Ware III	Republican	1970	Incumbent retired. Republican hold.	✓ Richard T. Schulze (Republican) 59.6%; Leo D. McDermott (Democratic) 40.4%
Pennsylvania 6	Gus Yatron	Democratic	1968	Incumbent re-elected.	✓ Gus Yatron (Democratic) 74.6%; Stephen Postupack (Republican) 24.0%; Frank E. Huet (Constitution) 1.4%
Pennsylvania 7	Lawrence G. Williams	Republican	1966	Incumbent lost renomination. Democratic gain.	✓ Robert W. Edgar (Democratic) 55.3%; Stephen J. McEwen Jr. (Republican) 43.7%; Ralph F. Johns (Constitution) 1.1%
Pennsylvania 8	Edward G. Biester Jr.	Republican	1966	Incumbent re-elected.	✓ Edward G. Biester Jr. (Republican) 56.2%; William B. Moyer (Democratic) 40.9%; Robert D. McKenney (Constitution) 2.8%
Pennsylvania 9	Bud Shuster	Republican	1972	Incumbent re-elected.	✓ Bud Shuster (Republican) 56.5%; Robert D. Ford (Democratic) 43.5%
Pennsylvania 10	Joseph M. McDade	Republican	1962	Incumbent re-elected.	✓ Joseph M. McDade (Republican) 64.9%; Thomas J. Hanlon (Democratic) 35.1%
Pennsylvania 11	Daniel J. Flood	Democratic	1944; 1946 (defeated); 1948; 1952 (defeated); 1954	Incumbent re-elected.	✓ Daniel J. Flood (Democratic) 74.5%; Richard A. Muzyka (Republican) 25.5%
Pennsylvania 12	John Murtha	Democratic	1974	Incumbent re-elected.	✓ John Murtha (Democratic) 58.1%; Harry M. Fox (Republican) 41.9%
Pennsylvania 13	R. Lawrence Coughlin	Republican	1968	Incumbent re-elected.	✓ R. Lawrence Coughlin (Republican) 62.5%; Lawrence H. Curry (Democratic) 37.5%
Pennsylvania 14	William S. Moorhead	Democratic	1958	Incumbent re-elected.	✓ William S. Moorhead (Democratic) 77.5%; Zachary T. Davis (Republican) 22.5%
Pennsylvania 15	Fred B. Rooney	Democratic	1963 (Special)	Incumbent re-elected.	✓ Fred B. Rooney (Democratic); Unopposed
Pennsylvania 16	Edwin D. Eshleman	Republican	1966	Incumbent re-elected.	✓ Edwin D. Eshleman (Republican) 63.5%; Michael J. Minney (Democratic) 35.0%; Arlene R. Wenger (Constitution) 1.5%
Pennsylvania 17	Herman T. Schneebeli	Republican	1960	Incumbent re-elected.	✓ Herman T. Schneebeli (Republican) 52.1%; Peter C. Wambach (Democratic) 47.9%
Pennsylvania 18	H. John Heinz III	Republican	1971 (Special)	Incumbent re-elected.	✓ H. John Heinz III (Republican) 72.1%; Francis J. McArdle (Democratic) 27.9%
Pennsylvania 19	George Atlee Goodling	Republican	1960; 1964 (defeated); 1966	Incumbent retired. Republican hold.	✓ William F. Goodling (Republican) 51.4%; Arthur L. Berger (Democratic) 47.5%; Joseph Paul (Constitution) 1.0%
Pennsylvania 20	Joseph M. Gaydos	Democratic	1968	Incumbent re-elected.	✓ Joseph M. Gaydos (Democratic) 81.7%; Joseph J. Anderko (Republican) 18.3%
Pennsylvania 21	John H. Dent	Democratic	1958	Incumbent re-elected.	✓ John H. Dent (Democratic) 69.9%; Charles L. Sconing (Republican) 30.1%
Pennsylvania 22	Thomas E. Morgan	Democratic	1944	Incumbent re-elected.	✓ Thomas E. Morgan (Democratic) 63.6%; James R. Montgomery (Republican) 31.7%; John Bove (Constitution) 4.7%
Pennsylvania 23	Albert W. Johnson	Republican	1963 (Special)	Incumbent re-elected.	✓ Albert W. Johnson (Republican) 52.7%; Yates Mast (Democratic) 47.3%
Pennsylvania 24	Joseph P. Vigorito	Democratic	1964	Incumbent re-elected.	✓ Joseph P. Vigorito (Democratic) 58.6%; Clement R. Scalzitti (Republican) 41.4%
Pennsylvania 25	Frank M. Clark	Democratic	1954	Incumbent lost re-election. Republican gain.	✓ Gary A. Myers (Republican) 53.8%; Frank M. Clark (Democratic) 46.2%

== Rhode Island ==
District	Incumbent			This race	
District	Member	Party	First elected	Results	Candidates
Rhode Island 1	Fernand St. Germain	Democratic	1960	Incumbent re-elected.	✓ Fernand St. Germain (Democratic) 72.9%; Ernest Barone (Republican) 27.1%
Rhode Island 2	Robert Tiernan	Democratic	1967 (Special)	Incumbent lost renomination. Democratic hold.	✓ Edward Beard (Democratic) 78.2%; Vincent J. Rotondo (Republican) 21.8%

== South Carolina ==
District	Incumbent			This race	
District	Member	Party	First elected	Results	Candidates
South Carolina 1	Mendel Jackson Davis	Democratic	1971 (Special)	Incumbent re-elected.	✓ Mendel Jackson Davis (Democratic) 72.7%; George B. Rast (Republican) 25.9%; Charles Amaker (Independent) 0.8%; Benjamin Frasier (United Citizens) 0.6%
South Carolina 2	Floyd Spence	Republican	1970	Incumbent re-elected.	✓ Floyd Spence (Republican) 56.1%; Matthew J. Perry (Democratic) 43.0%; Paul Proveaux (Independent) 0.9%
South Carolina 3	William Jennings Bryan Dorn	Democratic	1946; 1948 (retired); 1950	Incumbent retired to run for governor of South Carolina. Democratic hold.	✓ Butler Derrick (Democratic) 61.8%; Marshall J. Parker (Republican) 38.2%
South Carolina 4	James R. Mann	Democratic	1968	Incumbent re-elected.	✓ James R. Mann (Democratic) 63.3%; Robert L. Watkins (Republican) 36.7%
South Carolina 5	Thomas S. Gettys	Democratic	1964	Incumbent retired. Democratic hold.	✓ Kenneth Lamar Holland (Democratic) 61.4%; Lenard Phillips (Republican) 37.8%; Bert Sumner (Independent) 0.8%
South Carolina 6	Edward Lunn Young	Republican	1972	Incumbent lost re-election. Democratic gain.	✓ John Jenrette (Democratic) 52.0%; Edward Lunn Young (Republican) 48.0%

== South Dakota ==
District	Incumbent			This race	
District	Member	Party	First elected	Results	Candidates
South Dakota 1	Frank E. Denholm	Democratic	1970	Incumbent lost re-election. Republican gain.	✓ Larry Pressler (Republican) 55.3%; Frank E. Denholm (Democratic) 44.7%
South Dakota 2	James Abdnor	Republican	1972	Incumbent re-elected.	✓ James Abdnor (Republican) 67.8%; Jack M. Weiland (Democratic) 32.2%

== Tennessee ==
District	Incumbent			This race	
District	Member	Party	First elected	Results	Candidates
Tennessee 1	Jimmy Quillen	Republican	1962	Incumbent re-elected.	✓ Jimmy Quillen (Republican) 64.2%; Lloyd Blevins (Democratic) 35.8%
Tennessee 2	John Duncan Sr.	Republican	1964	Incumbent re-elected.	✓ John Duncan Sr. (Republican) 70.9%; Jesse James Brown (Democratic) 29.1%
Tennessee 3	LaMar Baker	Republican	1970	Incumbent lost re-election. Democratic gain.	✓ Marilyn Lloyd (Democratic) 51.5%; LaMar Baker (Republican) 46.2%; Sarah Delaney (Independent) 2.2%
Tennessee 4	Joe L. Evins	Democratic	1946	Incumbent re-elected.	✓ Joe L. Evins (Democratic); Unopposed
Tennessee 5	Richard Fulton	Democratic	1962	Incumbent re-elected.	✓ Richard Fulton (Democratic) 99.8%; Bill Tankard (Independent) 0.2%
Tennessee 6	Robin Beard	Republican	1972	Incumbent re-elected.	✓ Robin Beard (Republican) 56.7%; Tim Schaeffer (Democratic) 43.3%
Tennessee 7	Ed Jones	Democratic	1969 (Special)	Incumbent re-elected.	✓ Ed Jones (Democratic); Unopposed
Tennessee 8	Dan Kuykendall	Republican	1966	Incumbent lost re-election. Democratic gain.	✓ Harold Ford Sr. (Democratic) 49.9%; Dan Kuykendall (Republican) 49.4%; Louis L. Porter (Independent) 0.7%

== Texas ==
District	Incumbent			This race	
District	Member	Party	First elected	Results	Candidates
Texas 1	Wright Patman	Democratic	1928	Incumbent re-elected.	✓ Wright Patman (Democratic) 68.6%; James W. Farris (Republican) 31.4%
Texas 2	Charles Wilson	Democratic	1972	Incumbent re-elected.	✓ Charles Wilson (Democratic); Unopposed
Texas 3	James M. Collins	Republican	1968	Incumbent re-elected.	✓ James M. Collins (Republican) 64.7%; Harold Collum (Democratic) 35.3%
Texas 4	Ray Roberts	Democratic	1962	Incumbent re-elected.	✓ Ray Roberts (Democratic) 74.9%; Dick LeTourneau (Republican) 25.1%
Texas 5	Alan Steelman	Republican	1972	Incumbent re-elected.	✓ Alan Steelman (Republican) 52.1%; Mike McKool (Democratic) 47.9%
Texas 6	Olin E. Teague	Democratic	1946	Incumbent re-elected.	✓ Olin E. Teague (Democratic) 83.0%; Carl Nigliazzo (Republican) 17.0%
Texas 7	William Reynolds Archer Jr.	Republican	1970	Incumbent re-elected.	✓ William Reynolds Archer Jr. (Republican) 79.2%; Jim Brady (Democratic) 20.8%
Texas 8	Robert C. Eckhardt	Democratic	1966	Incumbent re-elected.	✓ Robert C. Eckhardt (Democratic) 72.2%; Donald D. Whitefield (Republican) 27.8%
Texas 9	Jack Brooks	Democratic	1952	Incumbent re-elected.	✓ Jack Brooks (Democratic) 61.9%; Coleman R. Ferguson (Republican) 38.1%
Texas 10	J. J. Pickle	Democratic	1963 (Special)	Incumbent re-elected.	✓ J. J. Pickle (Democratic) 80.4%; Paul A. Weiss (Republican) 19.6%
Texas 11	William R. Poage	Democratic	1936	Incumbent re-elected.	✓ William R. Poage (Democratic) 81.6%; Don Clements (Republican) 17.2%; Laurel N. Dunn (Independent) 1.1%
Texas 12	Jim Wright	Democratic	1954	Incumbent re-elected.	✓ Jim Wright (Democratic) 78.7%; James S. Garvey (Republican) 21.3%
Texas 13	Robert Price	Republican	1966	Incumbent lost re-election. Democratic gain.	✓ Jack Hightower (Democratic) 57.6%; Robert Price (Republican) 42.4%
Texas 14	John Andrew Young	Democratic	1956	Incumbent re-elected.	✓ John Andrew Young (Democratic); Unopposed
Texas 15	Kika de la Garza	Democratic	1964	Incumbent re-elected.	✓ Kika de la Garza (Democratic); Unopposed
Texas 16	Richard Crawford White	Democratic	1964	Incumbent re-elected.	✓ Richard Crawford White (Democratic); Unopposed
Texas 17	Omar Burleson	Democratic	1946	Incumbent re-elected.	✓ Omar Burleson (Democratic); Unopposed
Texas 18	Barbara Jordan	Democratic	1972	Incumbent re-elected.	✓ Barbara Jordan (Democratic) 84.8%; Robbins Mitchell (Republican) 14.0%; Kris Vasquez (Socialist Workers) 1.2%
Texas 19	George H. Mahon	Democratic	1934	Incumbent re-elected.	✓ George H. Mahon (Democratic); Unopposed
Texas 20	Henry B. González	Democratic	1961 (Special)	Incumbent re-elected.	✓ Henry B. González (Democratic); Unopposed
Texas 21	O. C. Fisher	Democratic	1942	Incumbent retired. Democratic hold.	✓ Bob Krueger (Democratic) 52.6%; Doug Harlan (Republican) 45.2%; Ed Gallion (American) 2.2%
Texas 22	Robert R. Casey	Democratic	1958	Incumbent re-elected.	✓ Robert R. Casey (Democratic) 69.5%; Ron Paul (Republican) 28.4%; James T. Smith (American) 1.2%; Jill Fein (Socialist Workers) 0.9%
Texas 23	Abraham Kazen	Democratic	1966	Incumbent re-elected.	✓ Abraham Kazen (Democratic); Unopposed
Texas 24	Dale Milford	Democratic	1972	Incumbent re-elected.	✓ Dale Milford (Democratic) 76.1%; Joseph Beaman Jr. (Republican) 20.4%; Earl W. Armstrong (American) 3.5%

== Utah ==
District	Incumbent			This race	
District	Member	Party	First elected	Results	Candidates
Utah 1	K. Gunn McKay	Democratic	1970	Incumbent re-elected.	✓ K. Gunn McKay (Democratic) 62.6%; Ronald W. Inkley (Republican) 31.5%; L. S. Brown (American) 5.9%
Utah 2	Douglas W. Owens	Democratic	1972	Incumbent retired to run for U.S. senator. Democratic hold.	✓ Allan Howe (Democratic) 49.5%; Stephen Harmsen (Republican) 46.9%; Bruce R. Bangerter (American) 3.0%; Karl J. Bray (Libertarian) 0.6%

== Vermont ==
District	Incumbent			This race	
District	Member	Party	First elected	Results	Candidates
Vermont at-large	Richard W. Mallary	Republican	1972 (Special)	Incumbent retired to run for U.S. senator. Republican hold.	✓ Jim Jeffords (Republican) 52.9%; Francis J. Cain (Democratic) 38.1%; Michael Parenti (Liberty) 7.1%; Francis J. Cain (Independent) 1.9%

== Virginia ==
District	Incumbent			This race	
District	Member	Party	First elected	Results	Candidates
Virginia 1	Thomas N. Downing	Democratic	1958	Incumbent re-elected.	✓ Thomas N. Downing (Democratic); Unopposed
Virginia 2	G. William Whitehurst	Republican	1968	Incumbent re-elected.	✓ G. William Whitehurst (Republican) 60.0%; Robert Richards (Democratic) 40.0%
Virginia 3	David E. Satterfield III	Democratic	1964	Incumbent re-elected.	✓ David E. Satterfield III (Democratic) 89.5%; Alan Robert Ogden (Independent) 10.5%
Virginia 4	Robert Daniel	Republican	1972	Incumbent re-elected.	✓ Robert Daniel (Republican) 47.2%; Lester E. Schlitz (Democratic) 35.9%; Curtis W. Harris (Independent) 16.9%
Virginia 5	Dan Daniel	Democratic	1968	Incumbent re-elected.	✓ Dan Daniel (Democratic); Unopposed
Virginia 6	M. Caldwell Butler	Republican	1972	Incumbent re-elected.	✓ M. Caldwell Butler (Republican) 45.1%; Paul J. Puckett (Democratic) 27.0%; Warren D. Saunders (Independent) 26.1%; Timothy A. McGay (Independent) 1.8%
Virginia 7	J. Kenneth Robinson	Republican	1970	Incumbent re-elected.	✓ J. Kenneth Robinson (Republican) 52.7%; George H. Gilliam (Democratic) 47.3%
Virginia 8	Stanford Parris	Republican	1972	Incumbent lost re-election. Democratic gain.	✓ Herbert Harris (Democratic) 57.6%; Stanford Parris (Republican) 42.4%
Virginia 9	William C. Wampler	Republican	1952; 1954 (defeated); 1966	Incumbent re-elected.	✓ William C. Wampler (Republican) 50.9%; Charles J. Horne (Democratic) 49.1%
Virginia 10	Joel T. Broyhill	Republican	1952	Incumbent lost re-election. Democratic gain.	✓ Joseph L. Fisher (Democratic) 53.6%; Joel T. Broyhill (Republican) 45.2%; Francis J. Speh (Independent) 1.2%

== Washington ==
District	Incumbent			This race	
District	Member	Party	First elected	Results	Candidates
Washington 1	Joel Pritchard	Republican	1972	Incumbent re-elected.	✓ Joel Pritchard (Republican) 69.5%; W. R. Knedlik (Democratic) 28.6%; Fred Lovgren (Socialist Workers) 1.1%; Patricia Dolbeare (Labor) 0.8%
Washington 2	Lloyd Meeds	Democratic	1964	Incumbent re-elected.	✓ Lloyd Meeds (Democratic) 59.7%; Ronald C. Reed (Republican) 38.9%; Paul Roberts (Labor) 1.3%
Washington 3	Julia Butler Hansen	Democratic	1960	Incumbent retired. Democratic hold.	✓ Don Bonker (Democratic) 60.9%; A. Ludlow Kramer (Republican) 38.1%; Evelyn K. Olafson (Labor) 1.0%
Washington 4	Mike McCormack	Democratic	1970	Incumbent re-elected.	✓ Mike McCormack (Democratic) 58.9%; Floyd Paxton (Republican) 41.1%
Washington 5	Tom Foley	Democratic	1964	Incumbent re-elected.	✓ Tom Foley (Democratic) 64.3%; Gary G. Gage (Republican) 35.7%
Washington 6	Floyd Hicks	Democratic	1964	Incumbent re-elected.	✓ Floyd Hicks (Democratic) 71.8%; George M. Nalley (Republican) 28.2%
Washington 7	Brock Adams	Democratic	1964	Incumbent re-elected.	✓ Brock Adams (Democratic) 71.1%; Raymond Pritchard (Republican) 28.9%

== West Virginia ==
District	Incumbent			This race	
District	Member	Party	First elected	Results	Candidates
West Virginia 1	Bob Mollohan	Democratic	1952; 1956 (retired); 1968	Incumbent re-elected.	✓ Bob Mollohan (Democratic) 59.7%; Joe Laurita Jr. (Republican) 40.3%
West Virginia 2	Harley O. Staggers	Democratic	1948	Incumbent re-elected.	✓ Harley O. Staggers (Democratic) 64.4%; William H. "Bill" Loy (Republican) 35.6%
West Virginia 3	John M. Slack Jr.	Democratic	1958	Incumbent re-elected.	✓ John M. Slack Jr. (Democratic) 69.8%; William L. Larcamp (Republican) 30.2%
West Virginia 4	Ken Hechler	Democratic	1958	Incumbent re-elected.	✓ Ken Hechler (Democratic); Unopposed

== Wisconsin ==
District	Incumbent			This race	
District	Member	Party	First elected	Results	Candidates
Wisconsin 1	Les Aspin	Democratic	1970	Incumbent re-elected.	✓ Les Aspin (Democratic) 70.5%; Leonard W. Smith (Republican) 29.5%
Wisconsin 2	Robert W. Kastenmeier	Democratic	1958	Incumbent re-elected.	✓ Robert W. Kastenmeier (Democratic) 64.8%; Elizabeth T. Miller (Republican) 35.2%
Wisconsin 3	Vernon Wallace Thomson	Republican	1960	Incumbent lost re-election. Democratic gain.	✓ Alvin Baldus (Democratic) 51.1%; Vernon Wallace Thomson (Republican) 47.4%; Keith Ellison (American) 1.4%
Wisconsin 4	Clement J. Zablocki	Democratic	1948	Incumbent re-elected.	✓ Clement J. Zablocki (Democratic) 72.5%; Lewis H. Collison (Republican) 23.8%; Herbert O. Jahnke (American) 3.8%
Wisconsin 5	Henry S. Reuss	Democratic	1954	Incumbent re-elected.	✓ Henry S. Reuss (Democratic) 80.0%; Mildred A. Morries (Republican) 20.0%
Wisconsin 6	William A. Steiger	Republican	1966	Incumbent re-elected.	✓ William A. Steiger (Republican) 59.5%; Nancy J. Simenz (Democratic) 35.4%; Harvey C. LeRoy (American) 5.1%
Wisconsin 7	Dave Obey	Democratic	1969 (Special)	Incumbent re-elected.	✓ Dave Obey (Democratic) 70.6%; Josef Burger (Republican) 29.4%
Wisconsin 8	Harold Vernon Froehlich	Republican	1972	Incumbent lost re-election. Democratic gain.	✓ Robert John Cornell (Democratic) 54.4%; Harold Vernon Froehlich (Republican) 45.6%
Wisconsin 9	Glenn Robert Davis	Republican	1947 (special); 1956 (retired); 1964	Incumbent lost renomination. Republican hold.	✓ Bob Kasten (Republican) 52.9%; Lynn S. Adelman (Democratic) 45.0%; William D. Quirk (American) 2.1%

== Wyoming ==
District	Incumbent			This race	
District	Member	Party	First elected	Results	Candidates
Wyoming at-large	Teno Roncalio	Democratic	1964; 1966 (retired); 1970	Incumbent re-elected.	✓ Teno Roncalio (Democratic) 54.7%; Tom Strock (Republican) 45.3%

== See also ==
- 1974 United States elections
  - 1974 United States gubernatorial elections
  - 1974 United States Senate elections
- 93rd United States Congress
- 94th United States Congress
- Watergate Babies
- Watergate scandal

== Works cited ==
- Abramson, Paul; Aldrich, John; Rohde, David (1995). Change and Continuity in the 1992 Elections. CQ Press. ISBN 0871878399.
