= Edward Warman =

Edward Warman may refer to:

- Edward B. Warman (1847–1931), American psychologist and health expert
- Edward A. Warman (1926–1980), American politician, member of the Illinois House of Representatives
