= 1969 United States House of Representatives elections =

1969 U.S. House of Representatives elections
- March 25, 1969 – November 25, 1969

7 (out of 435) seats in the U.S. House of Representatives 218 seats needed for a majority
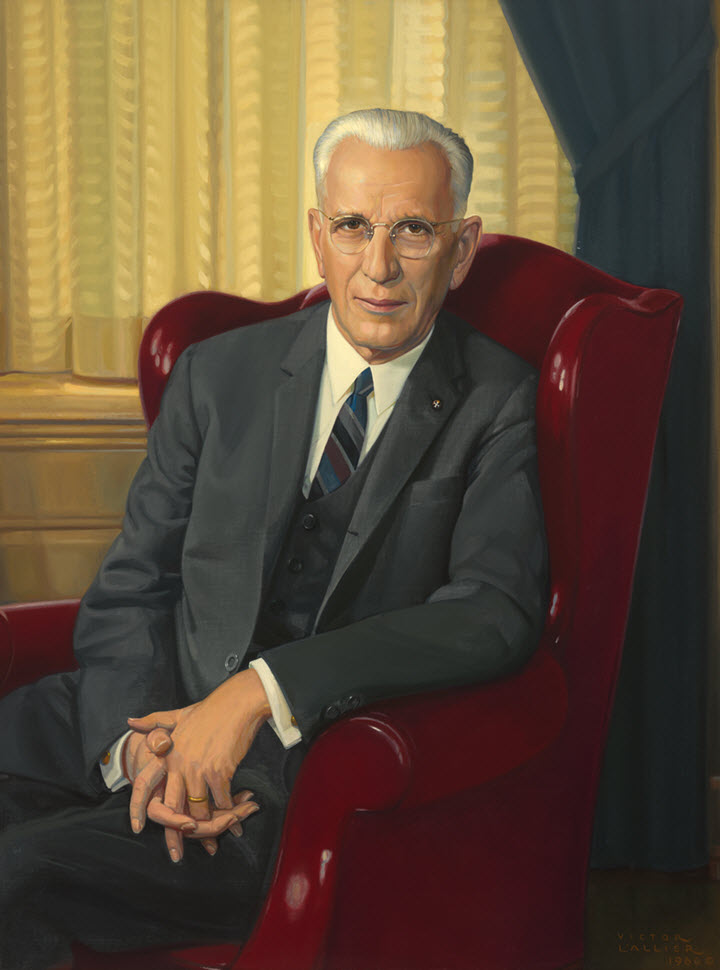

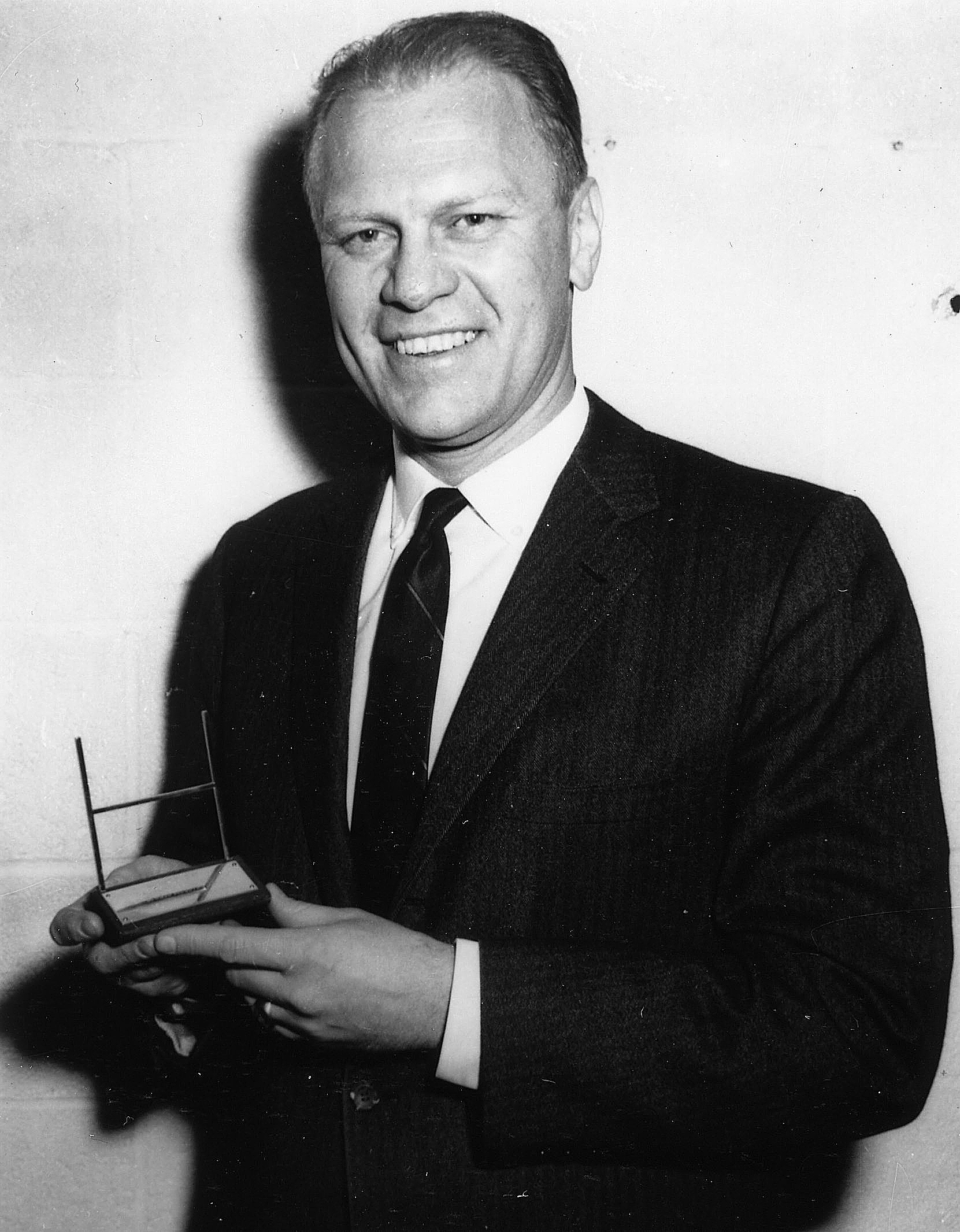
	Majority party	Minority party
Leader	John McCormack	Gerald Ford
Party	Democratic	Republican
Leader since	January 10, 1962	January 3, 1965
Leader's seat	Massachusetts 9th	Michigan 5th
Last election	243 seats	192 seats
Seat change	▲3	▼3
Seats up	2	5
Races won	5	2

There were seven special elections to the United States House of Representatives in 1969 to the 91st United States Congress.

== List of elections ==
Elections are listed by date and district.

District	Incumbent			This race	
District	Member	Party	First elected	Results	Candidates
Tennessee 8	Robert A. Everett	Democratic	1958 (special)	Incumbent died January 26, 1969. New member elected March 25, 1969. Democratic hold.	▌ ✓ Ed Jones (Democratic) 47.64%; ▌William J. Davis (American) 23.62%; ▌Leonard C. Dunavant (Republican) 22.75%; ▌James O. Lanier (Independent) 3.38%; ▌O. W. Pickett (Independent) 2.04%
Wisconsin 7	Melvin Laird	Republican	1952	Incumbent resigned January 21, 1969 to become U.S. Secretary of Defense. New member elected April 1, 1969. Democratic gain.	▌ ✓ Dave Obey (Democratic) 51.65%; ▌Walter John Chilsen (Republican) 48.35%
California 27	Edwin Reinecke	Republican	1964	Incumbent resigned January 21, 1969 to become Lieutenant Governor of California. New member elected April 29, 1969. Republican hold.	▌ ✓ Barry Goldwater Jr. (Republican) 56.93%; ▌John Van de Kamp (Democratic) 43.07%
Montana 2	James F. Battin	Republican	1960	Incumbent resigned February 27, 1969 to become a U.S. District Court judge. New member elected June 24, 1969. Democratic gain.	▌ ✓ John Melcher (Democratic) 50.84%; ▌William S. Mather (Republican) 48.56%; ▌Derby C. Whitmer (American Independent) 0.60%
Massachusetts 6	William H. Bates	Republican	1960 (special)	Incumbent died June 22, 1969. New member elected September 30, 1969. Democratic gain.	▌ ✓ Michael J. Harrington (Democratic) 52.39%; ▌William L. Saltonstall (Republican) 47.60%
New Jersey 8	Charles S. Joelson	Democratic	1960	Incumbent resigned September 4, 1969 to become judge of Superior Court of New Jersey. New member elected November 4, 1969. Democratic hold.	▌ ✓ Robert A. Roe (Democratic) 49.21%; ▌Gene Boyle (Republican) 48.51%; ▌Walter E. Johnson (Independent) 2.29%
Illinois 13	Donald Rumsfeld	Republican	1962	Incumbent resigned May 25, 1969 to become Director of the Office of Economic Opportunity. New member elected November 25, 1969. Republican hold.	▌ ✓ Phil Crane (Republican) 58.39%; ▌Edward A. Warman (Democratic) 41.61%
