= John C. Peterson =

American politician (1948–2025)

Member of the Kansas House of Representatives for the 46th (1971–1973) and 55th (1973–1975) districts
- In office 1971–1975
- Preceded by: Roy W. Jaquith
- Succeeded by: Loren H. Hohman II

Personal details
- Born: April 15, 1948 Topeka, Kansas, U.S.
- Died: January 8, 2025 (aged 76)
- Party: Republican
- Spouse(s): Debra Mahoney (m. 1980; div. 1990) Michelle Liester (m. 1993)
- Children: 1
- Parents: Cecil "Pete" Peterson (father); Helen Lyon (mother)

John C. Peterson (April 15, 1948 – January 8, 2025) was an American politician from the state of Kansas. He served as a Republican member of the Kansas House of Representatives from 1971 to 1975 and ran for the U.S. House of Representatives in 1974.

== Life and career ==
Peterson was born on April 15, 1948, in Topeka, Kansas, the son of Cecil "Pete" and Helen (née Lyon) Peterson. He earned a bachelor's degree in political science from Stanford University and a J.D. from the Washburn University School of Law. In 1970, at the age of 22, he was elected to the Kansas House of Representatives from a Topeka-based district. After being re-elected, he chaired the Public Health and Welfare Committee, and ran for Kansas's 2nd congressional district in 1974, winning the Republican primary but losing the general election to Martha Keys.

Peterson then retired from elective politics, proceeding to practice law for the next 25 years. In 2000, he founded Capitol Strategies LLC, a firm that lobbies the Kansas Legislature. He retired in 2021, and died on January 8, 2025, at the age of 76.

== Electoral history ==
=== 1970 ===
==== Primary election ====
Kansas House of Representatives, District 46, 1970 primary election * denotes incumbent Source:
Party	Candidate	Votes	%
Republican	John C. Peterson	1,121	39.4
Republican	Q. B. Low	871	30.6
Republican	Delores West	332	11.7
Republican	Tyler Conrad	322	11.3
Republican	James W. Morrison	197	6.9
Total votes		2,843	100

==== General election ====
Kansas House of Representatives, District 46, 1970 general election * denotes incumbent Source:
Party	Candidate	Votes	%
Republican	John C. Peterson	3,508	55.9
Democratic	Robert N. Holmes	2,771	44.1
Total votes		6,279	100

=== 1972 ===
==== Primary election ====
Kansas House of Representatives, District 55, 1972 primary election * denotes incumbent Source:
Party	Candidate	Votes	%
Republican	John C. Peterson *	1,978	100
Total votes		1,978	100

==== General election ====
Kansas House of Representatives, District 55, 1972 general election * denotes incumbent Source:
Party	Candidate	Votes	%
Republican	John C. Peterson *	4,026	58.9
Democratic	C. Ray Trueblood	2,808	41.1
Total votes		6,834	100

=== 1972 ===
==== Primary election ====
Kansas's 2nd congressional district, 1974 primary election * denotes incumbent Source:
Party	Candidate	Votes	%
Republican	John C. Peterson	27,832	57.6
Republican	Edward F. Reilly Jr.	20,446	42.4
Total votes		48,278	100

==== General election ====
Kansas's 2nd congressional district, 1974 general election * denotes incumbent Source:
Party	Candidate	Votes	%
Democratic	Martha Keys	84,864	55.0
Republican	John C. Peterson	67,650	43.9
Prohibition	David Scoggin	1,725	1.1
Total votes		154,239	100
