= 1969 Illinois elections =

Elections were held in Illinois in 1969. These included the election of members of Illinois Constitutional Convention and special elections for a number of offices.

== Election information ==
1969 was an off-year election.

== Federal elections ==
=== Illinois's 13th congressional district special election ===
A special election was held to fill the remainder of the unexpired term for Illinois's 13th congressional district, which had vacated by Republican Donald Rumsfeld when he had been appointed Director of the Office of Economic Opportunity.

Primaries were held October 7, and the general election was held November 25.

==== Democratic primary ====
Illinois's 13th Congressional district special election Democratic primary
Party	Candidate	Votes	%
Democratic	Edward A. Warman	6,638	99.52
Write-in		32	0.48
Total votes		6,670	100

==== Republican primary ====
Illinois's 13th Congressional district special election Republican primary
Party	Candidate	Votes	%
Republican	Philip M. Crane	17,919	22.77
Republican	Samuel H. Young	15,801	20.08
Republican	Joseph D. Mathewson	12,910	16.41
Republican	Alan R. Johnston	10,520	13.37
Republican	Eugene F. Schlickman	9,247	11.75
Republican	Gerald M. Marks	6,606	8.40
Republican	John J. Nimrod	5,552	7.06
Republican	Lar "America First" Daly	48	0.06
Republican	David A. Roe	27	0.03
Republican	Alan Weber	27	0.03
Republican	Yale Roe	26	0.03
Write-in	Others	1	0.00
Total votes		78,684	100

==== General election ====
Illinois's 13th Congressional district special election
Party	Candidate	Votes	%
Republican	Philip M. Crane	68,418	58.39
Democratic	Edward A. Warman	48,759	41.61
Total votes		117,177	100
Republican hold			

== State elections ==
=== Members of the Constitutional Convention ===
In 1968, Illinois voters approved a call for a constitutional convention. In 1969, elections were held to elect the members of the constitutional convention by Illinois Senate district.

Primaries were held to elect members to the Illinois Constitutional Convention on September 23, and general elections were held to elect these members on November 18, 1969. The elections were nonpartisan, and primaries were only held in districts where enough candidates were running that a primary was required to be held to narrow them down for the general.

=== Illinois Senate 53rd district special election ===
A special election was held for the 53rd district seat of the Illinois Senate left vacant after Paul Simon resigned to assume the office of lieutenant governor of Illinois. Primaries were held March 11, and the general election was held April 29.

Illinois's 53rd Legislative District special election Democratic primary
Party	Candidate	Votes	%
Democratic	Harry A. Briggs	3,133	46.91
Democratic	Patrick W. Riddleberger	1,786	26.74
Democratic	Robert L. Ford	1,012	15.15
Democratic	Sam P. Drenovac	391	5.85
Democratic	Walter T. (Buck) Simmons	353	5.29
Write-in		4	0.06
Total votes		6,679	100.0

Illinois's 53rd Legislative District special election Republican primary
Party	Candidate	Votes	%
Republican	Merrill Ottwein	3,520	76.06
Republican	Raymond O. Rogers	1,017	21.97
Republican	David F. Mallett	91	1.97
Total votes		4,628	100.0

Illinois's 53rd Legislative District special election
Party	Candidate	Votes	%
Republican	Merrill Ottwein	12,741	51.57
Democratic	Harry A. Briggs	11,962	48.42
Write-in		2	0.01
Total votes		24,705	100.0
Republican gain from Democratic			

=== Illinois House of Representatives 33rd district special election ===
A special election was held 33rd district seat of the Illinois House of Representatives left vacant after the death of John "Jack" B. Hill. Primaries were held May 6, and the general election was held June 24.

Illinois's 33rd Representative District special election Democratic primary
Party	Candidate	Votes	%
Democratic	John L. Wineland	3,012	99.21
Write-in		24	0.79
Total votes		3,036	100.0

Illinois's 33rd Representative District special election Republican primary
Party	Candidate	Votes	%
Republican	R. Bruce Waddell	5,688	29.88
Republican	Thomas R. "Tom" Davis	4,911	25.80
Republican	Charles F. Whitfield	4,473	23.50
Republican	Frederic E. Doederlein	3,963	20.82
Total votes		19,035	100.0

Illinois's 33rd Representative District special election
Party	Candidate	Votes	%
Republican	R. Bruce Waddell	15,815	55.03
Democratic	John L. Wineland	12,914	44.93
Write-in		12	0.04
Total votes		28,741	100.0
Republican hold			

== Local elections ==
Local elections were held.
