= 1974 United States Senate election in Kansas =

- November 5, 1974
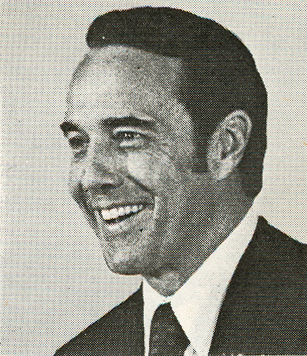

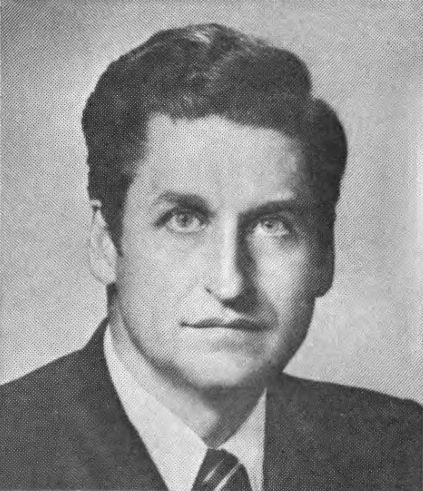
Nominee	Bob Dole	William R. Roy
Party	Republican	Democratic
Popular vote	403,983	390,451
Percentage	50.85%	49.15%
- County results Dole: 50–60% 60–70% Roy: 50–60% 60–70%
U.S. senator before election
Bob Dole
Republican
Elected U.S. Senator
Bob Dole
Republican

The 1974 United States Senate election in Kansas took place on November 5, 1974. Incumbent Republican U.S. Senator Bob Dole was narrowly re-elected to a second term in office.

Dole was considered vulnerable due to his close association with President Richard Nixon as chairman of the Republican National Committee in 1971 and 1972. In what would be the closest election of his 35-year congressional career, Dole won his second term by just 13,533 votes over Democrat William R. Roy, a Topeka physician and two-term U.S. representative.

Kansas has been represented in the U.S. Senate exclusively by Republicans since 1939. Roy's 1.7 percent margin of loss in the election was the closest the Democrats have come to winning one of the state's Senate seats between their last victory in 1932 and their next victory in 2026.

== Democratic primary ==
=== Candidates ===
- George Hart, former Kansas treasurer and perennial candidate from Wichita
- William R. Roy, U.S. representative from Topeka

=== Results ===
Democratic primary results
Party	Candidate	Votes	%
Democratic	William R. Roy	125,634	85.04%
Democratic	George Hart	22,109	14.96%
Total votes		147,743	100.00%

== General election ==
=== Candidates ===
- Bob Dole, incumbent senator since 1969 and former chair of the Republican National Committee (1971–73) (Republican)
- Bill Roy, U.S. representative from Topeka (Democratic)

=== Campaign ===
Bob Dole, who had been connected to the Watergate scandal during his freshman term through his role as the chair of the Republican National Committee and his support for President Richard Nixon, later admitted that he "was prepared to lose" the general election to Roy. He struggled to establish his position on the scandal, admitting in an interview that summer that "It's an impossible dilemma. One guy gives me hell for betraying Nixon, the next comes up to me and says, 'I'm for you Bob, but you've got to get Nixon off your back.'" Roy's advertisements contrasted Dole, "who put loyalty to Nixon and his party ahead of loyalty to his state," with Roy, a moderate and former Republican whom they described as "a respected voice for Kansas." Roy's campaign to be the first Democratic senator from Kansas in decades received an enthusiastic response, and he led in polling for months. "I could go to any event and feel like Caesar coming back to Rome," Roy said.

However, Dole's campaign was also among the first to make an issue of abortion in the wake of the Supreme Court's decision in Roe v. Wade, which struck down a Texas abortion restriction as an unconstitutional restraint on personal privacy. Roy, an obstetrician from Topeka, had performed a handful of legal abortions to save the lives of pregnant mothers. Roy, who also held a law degree, had also authored a law review article arguing that legislation against early-term abortions was a mistake. Though Dole did not explicitly campaign on the issue, he argued that Roy's past position on abortion was inconsistent with the position he took during the campaign, where he voiced general opposition to the procedure. Abortion, Dole countered, was an issue where "there isn't any middle ground, and you can't get up and make some fuzzy answer." Nevertheless, Roy "does it daily."

Abortion was one part of a larger strategy by the Dole campaign to regain momentum and overtake Roy, which focused on character issues. Dole emphasized his war record, while criticizing Roy, also a veteran, for missing votes on veterans affairs. "There's one military term Bill Roy understands: AWOL," read a Dole campaign mailer. Dole was also revitalized in the final weeks by an advertisement which accused Roy of mudslinging. The ad recounted Roy's attacks on Dole, then concluded by arguing that the Roy campaign "makes Bob Dole look pretty good, and Bill Roy look like just another mudslinger."

At the Kansas State Fair in September, abortion emerged at the forefront. At a debate on agriculture, where Dole set the terms of engagement and, as a rural Kansan and high-ranking member of the Agriculture Committee, had expected to win handily, Roy appeared to hold his own. In the closing minutes, Dole shifted abruptly and demanded to know Roy's position on abortion. After Roy equivocated, Dole asserted, "You heard him stand here today and say he was for abortion on demand," he asserted. According to one report, Mr. Dole declared, "I want to know how many abortions you've done." Roy supporters booed, but the debate began to turn the tide in favor of Dole. Roy's campaign stops were picketed by anti-abortion protestors, and the issue became more and more central to the Dole campaign. He spoke at the state Right to Life convention and urged Catholic high school students to ask Roy whether he had performed an abortion. Local anti-abortion groups joined the effort, publishing advertisements which read "Vote for Life. Don't elect an abortioner." In the final week,

=== Results ===
1974 United States Senate election in Kansas
Party	Candidate	Votes	%	±%
Republican	Bob Dole (incumbent)	403,983	50.85%	▼9.23
Democratic	William R. Roy	390,451	49.15%	▲10.49
Write-in		3	0.00%	
Majority		13,532	1.70%	▼19.72
Turnout		794,437		
Republican hold		Swing		

== See also ==
- 1974 United States Senate elections
