= Edward B. Warman =

Edward Barrett Warman
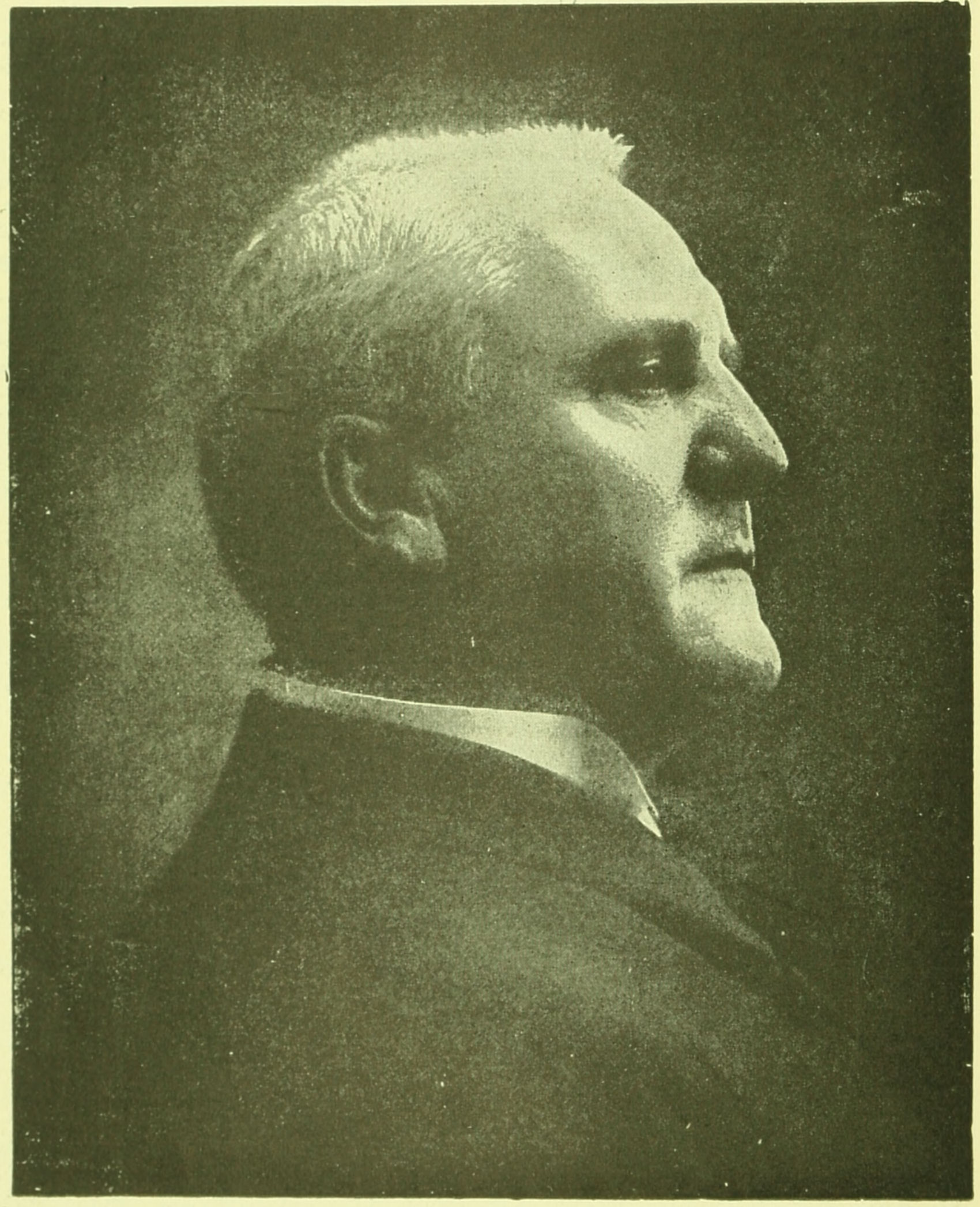
- Born: April 29, 1847; Warren County, New Jersey, U.S.
- Died: November 26, 1931 (aged 84); Los Angeles, California, U.S.
- Occupations: Psychologist, author
- Spouse: Flora M. Warman

Edward Barrett Warman (April 29, 1847 – November 26, 1931) was an American psychologist and health expert. He edited a column in the Los Angeles Times called "The Care of the Body", and he authored several books about physical culture. He advocated daily physical exercise.

== Selected works ==
- Warman, Edward B. (1885). A System of Practical Gymnastics Without a Teacher. Chicago: A.G. Spalding. OCLC 31387029.
- Warman, Edward B. (1897). Physical Training Simplified. American Sports Pub. Co.
- Warman, Edward B. (1923). The Care of the Body. New York: American Sports Pub. Co. OCLC 35254476.
- Warman, Edward B. (1930). 285 Health Answers. New York: American Sports Pub. Co. OCLC 5534044.
