= Judy Petty Wolf =

American politician

Arkansas State Representative
- In office January 3, 1981 – January 3, 1984

Personal details
- Born: September 4, 1943 (age 83) Little Rock, Arkansas, U.S.
- Party: Republican
- Spouse(s): (1) Divorced (2) Dr. Robert H. Wolf (deceased)
- Children: 1 daughter
- Education: University of Arkansas at Little Rock
- Occupation: Businesswoman

Judy Petty Wolf (born September 4, 1943) is an American politician who served in the Arkansas House of Representatives.

Her husband Dr. Robert Wolf died on April 15, 2018, at the age of 76.
