= Edward A. Warman =

American politician

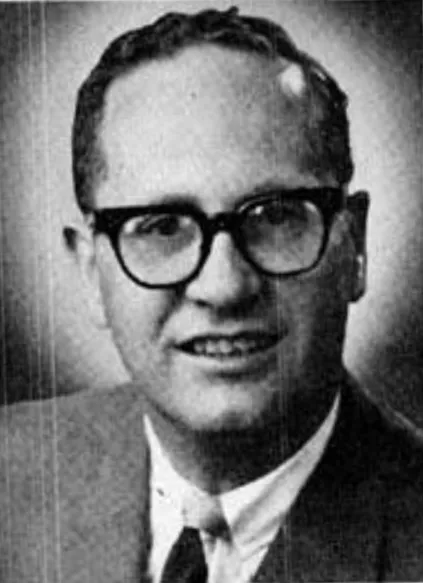
- Warman in the 1960s

Member of the Illinois House of Representatives
- In office 1965–1971

Personal details
- Born: June 23, 1926 Oak Park, Illinois, U.S.
- Died: December 11, 1980 (aged 54)
- Party: Democratic
- Spouse: Doris
- Education: University of Illinois; Chicago-Kent College of Law

Edward A. Warman (June 23, 1926 – December 11, 1980) was an American politician. He served as a Democratic member of the Illinois House of Representatives.

== Life and career ==
Warman was born in Oak Park, Illinois. He attended the University of Illinois and Chicago-Kent College of Law.

Warman was an army sergeant during World War II.

Warman served in the Illinois House of Representatives from 1965 to 1971.

Warman died on December 11, 1980, at the age of 54.
