= Elmira Prison =

US Civil War POW camp in New York State

- Part of American Civil War prison camps
- Elmira, New York, United States
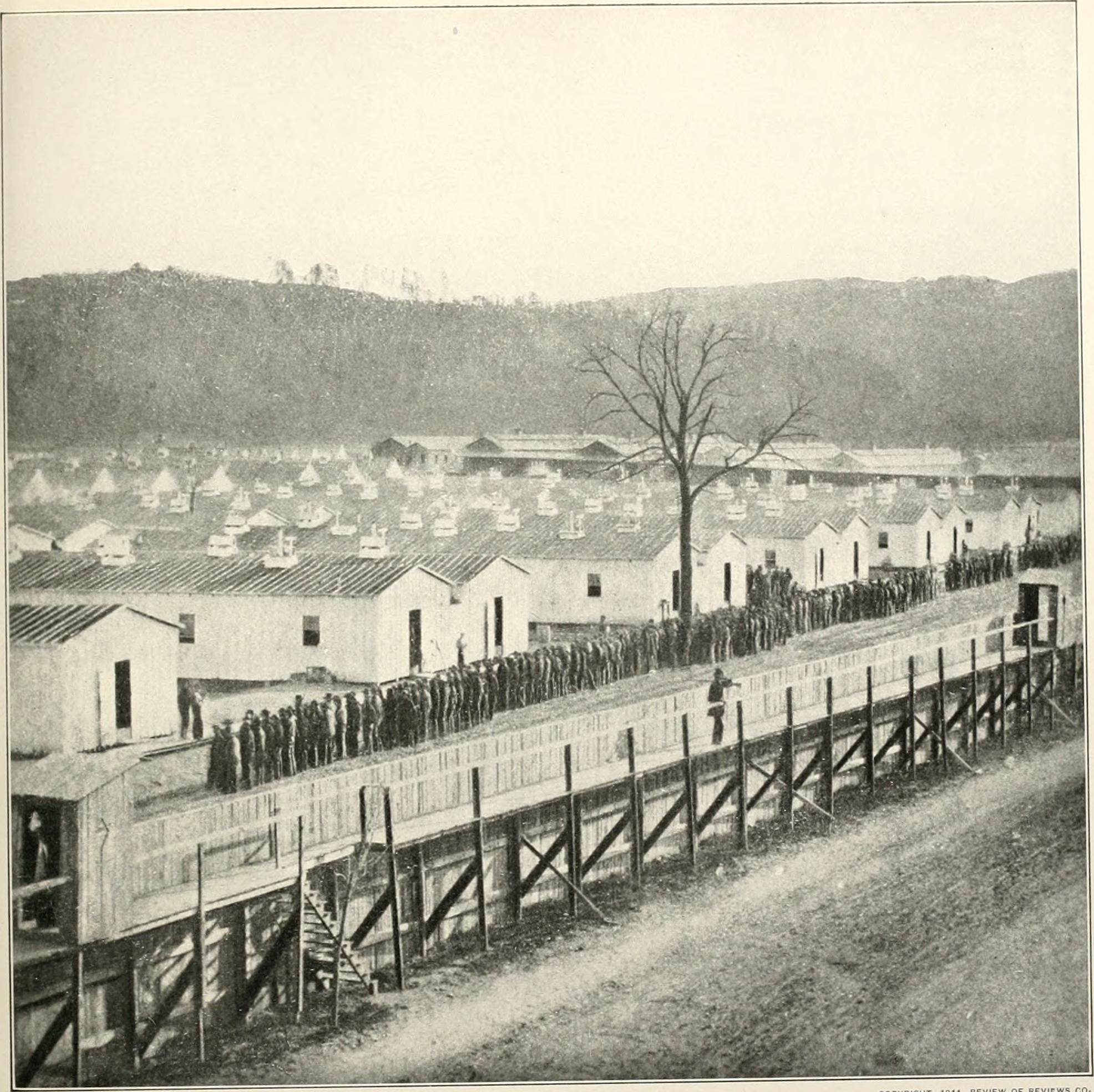
- U.S. prisoner of war camp for detaining civilians and military personnel of the Confederate States

Site information
- Type: Union Prison Camp
- Owner: United States government
- Controlled by: United States Army
- Open to the public: Yes

Site history
- Built: 1864
- In use: July 6, 1864–July 11, 1865
- Demolished: 1865
- Battles/wars: American Civil War
- Events: Shohola train wreck (1864)

Garrison information
- Past commanders: Major Henry V. Colt
- Occupants: Union soldiers, Confederate prisoners of war

Elmira Prison was originally a barracks for "Camp Rathbun" or "Camp Chemung", a key muster and training point for the Union Army during the American Civil War, between 1861 and 1864. The 30-acre (120,000 m^{2}) site was selected partially due to its proximity to the Erie Railroad and the Northern Central Railway, which crisscrossed in the midst of the city. The Camp fell into disuse as the war progressed, but its "Barracks #3" was converted into a military prison in the summer of 1864. It was the prison holding the largest number of Confederate POWs. Its capacity was 4,000, but it held 12,000 within one month of opening. A different source says that Camp Rathbun had a capacity of 6,000 recruits, but that it was converted into a prison for 10,000 and the Union Commissary General was given just 10 days to complete the transition.

The prison camp, in use from July 6, 1864, until July 11, 1865 (date of last arrival), was dubbed "Hellmira" by its inmates. During those 12 months, 2,970 of the 12,100 prisoners died from a combination of malnutrition, continued exposure to harsh winter weather, and disease from the poor sanitary conditions on Foster's Pond, combined with a lack of medical care. The camp's dead were prepared for burial and laid to rest at what is now Woodlawn National Cemetery. The cemetery, which is about 1.5 miles (2.4 km) north of the prison camp site, was designated a National Cemetery in 1877.

At the end of the war, each prisoner was required to take a loyalty oath and given a train ticket home. The last prisoner left the camp on September 27, 1865. The camp was then closed, demolished, and converted to farmland. A source suggests that the camp was so embarrassing, the site was deliberately destroyed. The area where the prison once stood is residential today, but work is underway to reconstruct the camp.

One of the conspirators of the assassination of Abraham Lincoln, John Surratt, claims to have been in Elmira, New York on a spy mission to gather information about the prison when Lincoln was shot. Upon hearing the news, he fled to Montreal in Quebec, British Canada.

== Training camp ==
On April 15, 1861, President Lincoln called for 75,000 volunteer troops to help suppress the rebellion. Elmira was one of three locations chosen as training centers in New York (Albany and New York City were the others) due to its location and railway hub. Troops were first housed in rented buildings, but these quickly became overwhelmed when an additional 500,000 troops were called for later that year. Four military installations were constructed throughout the city; Arnot Barracks, Camp Rathbun, Camp Robinson, and Post Barracks.

Camp Rathbun was built in between the Chemung River and Water Street. The campgrounds were enclosed in a 300yd by 500yd fence on the west, north, and east with Fosters Pond forming the southern boundary. Towner's history of 1892 and maps from the period indicate the camp occupied an area running about 1,000 feet (300 m) west and approximately the same distance south of a location a couple of hundred feet west of Hoffman Street and about 35 feet (11 m) south of Water Street, bordered on the south by Foster's Pond, on the north bank of the Chemung River. The camp consisted of 20 barracks (which could hold up to 2,000 troops), an officer's quarters, and two mess halls. Foster's Pond was used for bathing and washing.

The number of troops stationed in the city fluctuated for the first few months, and by June 1862, only fifty men occupied Camp Rathbun. This led to the closing of both Camp Robinson and Post Barracks, and they would never be used again. A month later, in July, conscription was enacted by the US Congress, and by 1863, Elmira was once again filled with troops. During this time, the city was named draft rendezvous headquarters for the western part of New York. At the beginning of 1864, the headquarters was placed under command of Lieutenant Colonel Seth Eastman. More facilities were built at the remaining two camps, and upon completion, allowed Camp Rathburn to hold up to 5,000 troops in the barracks, with an additional 1,000 troops in tents.

== Prison camp ==
In the first years of the war, there had been a prisoner exchange system, and most prisons lay empty. Confederate mistreatment and enslavement of Black Union soldiers in 1863 disrupted this system; by April 1864 it had been completely suspended, and prisons quickly became overcrowded. Space had recently opened up in Elmira after the departure of six companies of the 179th New York Volunteer Infantry Regiment. Commissary General of Prisoners William Hoffman was informed of this, and on May 19 he sent word to Eastman to "set apart the barracks on the Chemung River at Elmira as a depot for prisoners of war." He was also informed that the prison might be needed within ten days and that it might have to accommodate 8,000 or up to 10,000 prisoners.

According to Eastman's calculations, the camp could hold only half that properly. In addition, Eastman reported that the kitchens could feed only 5,000 a day and the mess room could seat only 1,500 men at once. To top all of this off, there were no hospital facilities in the camp; the soldiers instead relied on facilities in the town. Still, Eastman was told to be prepared to receive prisoners, and from the beginning it would seem that the camp was destined to be overcrowded. This led to many charges that the prison camp was designed from the beginning to be not a prison, but a death camp.

The camp's first Commandant was Major Henry V. Colt (brother of the famous pistol maker Samuel Colt) of the 104th New York Volunteers. He was given charge over the prisoners because of an inability to serve in the field (due to injury), a characteristic that many in his position in similar prison camps shared with him. A man of relatively even temperament, Colt achieved what few officers in the war were able to do, in that he was liked by both Union and Confederate soldiers.

Preparations of the camp were completed by the end of June, and Hoffman ordered 2,000 POWs to be transferred from the prison camp in Point Lookout, Maryland. They were divided into groups of 400 and given rations for the two day sea voyage up to Jersey City, New Jersey. The journey was extremely uncomfortable for the POWs in the overcrowded and filthy holds of the ships, even to the point that some men slept standing up. Once there, the first group of 400 prisoners was loaded aboard a train for the 17–20 hour trip to Elmira. 8,000 men would eventually be transferred from Point Lookout to Elmira not only due to overcrowding but also because of its vulnerability to attack from land and sea.

The train arrived in Elmira in the early morning of July 6. The POWs were then unloaded, put in double columns, and marched to the camp. Eyewitnesses describe the men as being dirty and ragged, but happy to be removed from their previous horrid confinement. Upon arriving at the camp, they were counted, divided into groups of 100, and shown their quarters.

=== Shohola disaster ===
The transfer of prisoners continued without incident until July 15, when a train carrying 833 Confederate POWs and 128 Union guards bound for Elmira collided with a coal train coming from the opposite direction. 49 POWs and 17 guards were killed with many more seriously wounded. The rail line was cleared of wreckage by the next day, and survivors were loaded aboard another train to continue their journey. News quickly spread of the accident, and by the time the train pulled into the station in Elmira later that night, a large crowd had gathered.

Eastman was waiting at the station with a special contingent of stretcher bearers, guards, and a caravan of 12 wagons. Those that could walk were removed first and marched by a torchlight procession to the camp where they received a warm meal. The more seriously wounded were then loaded aboard the wagons and followed suit. Amputations were performed first as was the custom of the day, followed by attending to those that were less critical (also known as triage). Though the understaffed and under supplied medical personnel worked tirelessly to treat the wounded, some men still lay unattended days later.

=== Prison life ===
Life inside the camp for the POWs was dull, and many sat around with nothing to do. There were those that found ways to occupy themselves through various means. Some built trinkets out of different items they found throughout the camp such as beef bone or horse hair; guards would then sell them throughout town. Those who were skilled in carpentry were hired by Union personnel to help build various facilities throughout the camp for a small wage and extra rations.

The outside of the prison took on a festive atmosphere. Two observatories, as well as food and beverage stands, were erected on the opposite side of Water Street during the summer months, and for 10–15¢, curious onlookers could view inside the camp. Prisoners, unhappy about being gawked at, would sometimes perform pejorative circus acts. In the beginning of September, the army took possession of the area and dismantled one of the towers. The other tower remained open though business declined due to the encroaching cold weather, and onlookers were beginning to realize the harsh reality of what they were paying to see.

=== Prison conditions ===
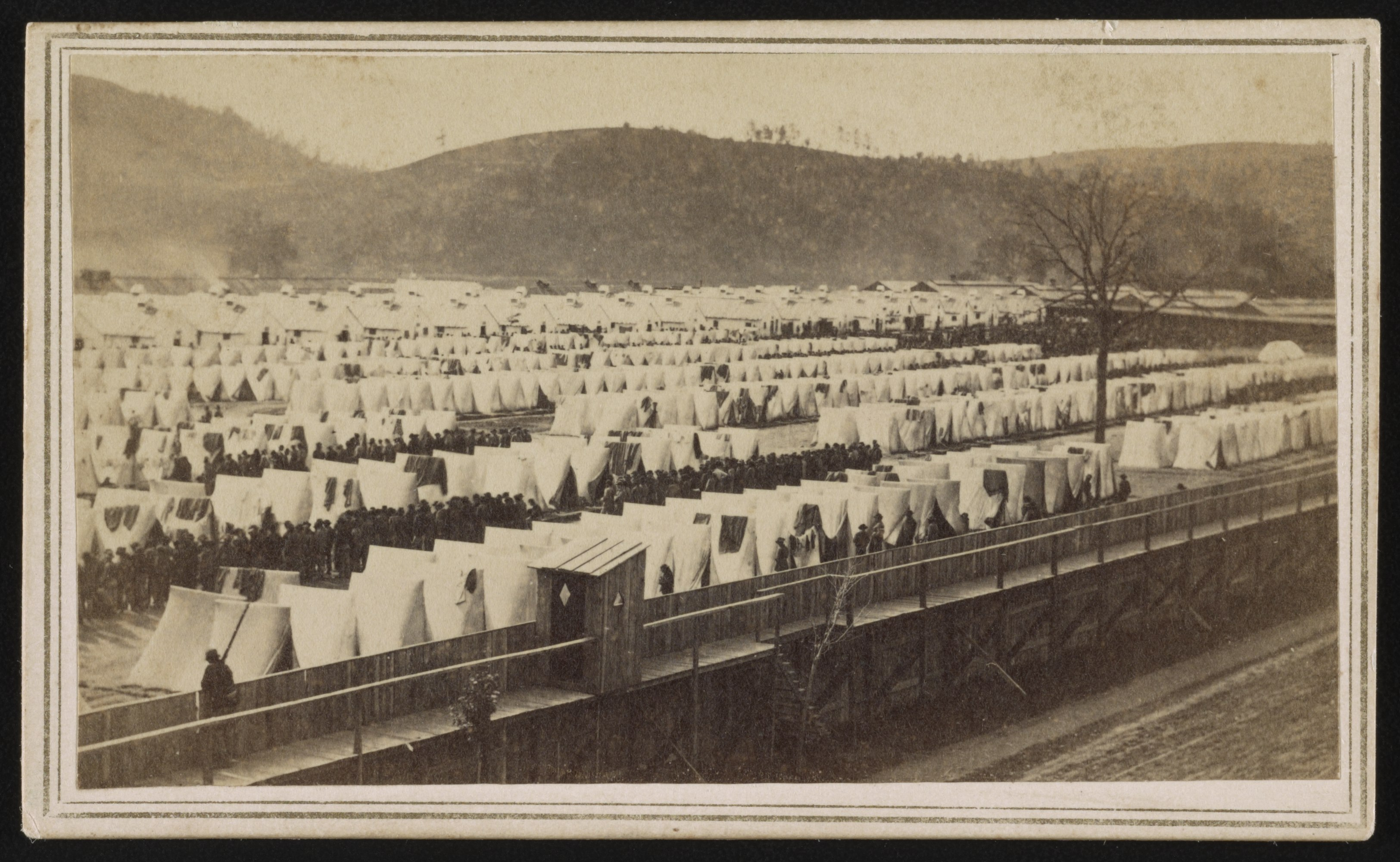
Photograph of Elmira entitled "Rebel pen" (Liljenquist collection)

Five days after the camp opened, Surgeon Charles T. Alexander was ordered to inspect the Camp at Colonel Hoffman's request. Alexander found two major problems with the camp that he detailed in his report. The first was that of the camp's sanitary conditions. The sinks near Foster's Pond contained stagnant water, and he feared if they were not cleaned, they might "become offensive and a source of disease." He recommended the construction of new sinks. Hoffman did not heed these warnings. By the middle of August, the number of prisoners had climbed to over 9,200. This ended up overwhelming the staff and quickly depleting supplies. Diseases soon broke out, and the death toll jumped from 11 in July to 121 by the end of August. It was not until October 27 that work finally began on the drainage system, but the cold weather kept this project from being completed until January 1. In the meantime, prisoners were subjected to stagnant and unclean water, and sickness soon prevailed throughout the camp.

The other problem that Alexander identified concerned the hospitals. While the camp now had a hospital, in the form of a tent, it did not have an assigned surgeon and instead relied on the services of William C. Wey, a local civilian. Alexander also thought the notion of using a tent as a hospital within the prison was inappropriate, and therefore should be rectified. Hoffman approved of three pavilion wards to be planned at Alexander's suggestion.

While Hoffman was open to suggestions on how to improve his prisons, he believed in thrift. After hearing reports of the horrible conditions Union soldiers faced in Confederate prison camps, he ordered reduced rations in retaliation. As a result, many prisoners were malnourished, which compounded the hardships they had to face (especially during the extreme summer heat and winter cold). Another major problem that points to Hoffman's policy of retaliation concerned the construction of winter housing for the prisoners. During most of their stay, many of the prisoners in Elmira lived in tents, as there was only room in the barracks for half of the 12,100 prisoners. A lack of lumber delayed the construction of new barracks until October when the cold New York nights started to pervade the camp. In November, it was also reported the existing barracks were experiencing trouble as well, with roofs falling into disrepair, unfit to withstand the elements. Even in late November and early December, there were reports of over 2,000 Confederates sleeping in tents, and a Christmas inspection said 900 still had no proper housing.

Earlier in September, Colonel Benjamin Tracy had replaced the ailing Lt. Col. Eastman as commander of headquarters. Tracy was a native to the Southern Tier of New York who had recently taken command of the 127th United States Colored Troops. There are conflicting accounts about his actions during his post as commander. Some say he was vindictive and intentionally reduced rations for the prisoners, while others show that he cared for his captives but was unable to do anything about their conditions due to government bureaucracy. In December, Lieutenant Colonel Stephen Moore was placed as commandant of the camp after Major Colt had returned to action.

The winter of 1864–65 was lethally cold. Twice the temperature dropped to -18°F and a major February storm dumped over two feet of snow. This was a shock to many Southerners who had never experienced such cold temperatures. Hoffman's reduced rationing began to take its toll on the prisoners, as they were reduced to eating rats. Indeed, rats became a currency in the trade system of the prisoners for other supplies. By March, hundreds of men had frozen to death or succumbed to disease. A spring thaw led to the flooding of the camp, and many of the prisoners were forced to huddle on top of the bunks in the barracks until rescue could arrive, and 2,700 feet of the stockade wall was washed away. In April came word of General Lee's surrender, and the camp began to parole the men.

=== Escape attempts ===
Though there were many escape attempts, only 10 men were successful. A day after the camp opened, two prisoners escaped by scaling the 12-foot stockade wall. Though there were many attempts to tunnel out of the camp, Washington B. Traweek led the only major successful escape from the prison along with a few other soldiers, all of them members of the Jefferson Davis Artillery Company. The escape plan involved digging a tunnel from a neighboring tent underneath the fence and into town. Later, when a series of hospitals was to be built for the camp, the prisoners involved in Traweek's plot decided to transfer their tunnel to go under the hospital and started work on a new tunnel. Others had a similar idea, which resulted in the tunnels being discovered. However, the first tunnel had not been discovered, so Traweek and his men returned to work on that tunnel. Though Colt was a fair man and was liked well enough by most of his prisoners, he took his duty seriously as commandant. The next day, Traweek was called before Major Colt. Colt inquired as to where Traweek's tunnel was and who had been tunneling with him. When Traweek refused to tell, Colt ordered him into a sweatbox and presided over his questioning, willing to go to extreme measures to find and persecute the tunnelers. Traweek held fast, however, and Colt was forced to release him. Traweek and his companions eventually escaped.

=== Burial of the dead ===
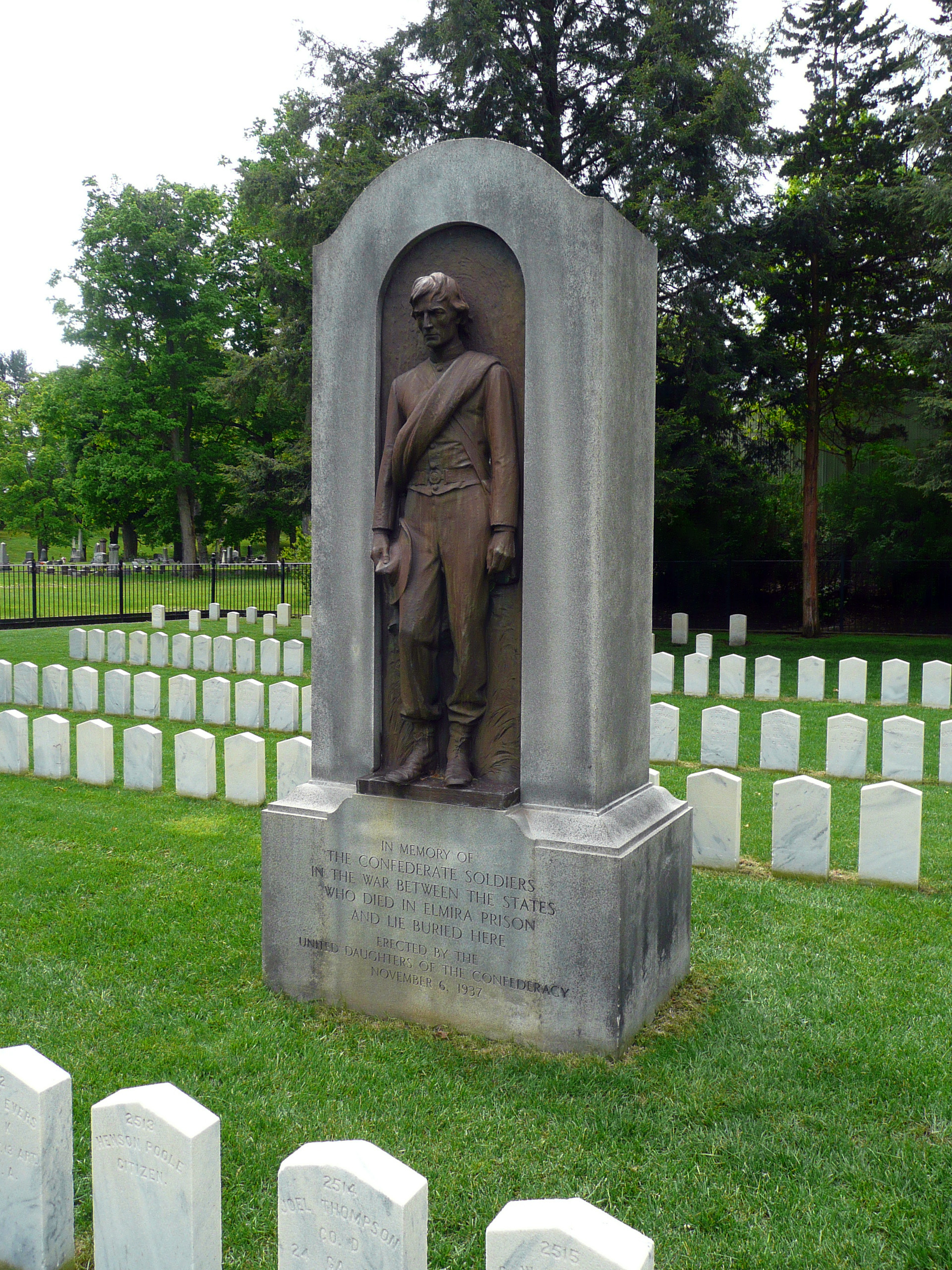
Confederate monument at Woodlawn National Cemetery in Elmira

The bodies of the deceased were prepared for burial at the camp and transferred to Woodlawn Cemetery approximately 1.5 miles north of the camp site. The coffins would then have a jar containing the name of the person and any information he was willing to share placed inside, and then be laid to rest side by side in a long burial trench. Wooden grave markers were erected in the pattern of soldiers lining up for inspection.

The man who was put in charge of overseeing the burials was John W. Jones, the local sexton and an ex-slave. Jones was respectable in his duties and kept such precise records that only 7 out of the nearly 3,000 men buried there are unknown. He carefully cataloged and stored any valuables that were in possession of the prisoners at the time of their death, and later shipped them to their families. After the war, several men were exhumed and transferred home, but most families chose not to have their loved ones moved due to the honorable way in which they were buried.

In 1907, the deteriorating wooden grave markers were replaced with marble headstones inscribed with the soldier's name, regiment, and grave number.

In 1911, remains of both Union and Confederate victims of the Shohola train wreck were exhumed from the site of the accident and interred at Woodlawn

In 1937, the United Daughters of the Confederacy had a monument erected in the section. The monument depicts a figure of a Confederate soldier overlooking the entire length of the section. The epitaph reads:

IN MEMORY OF THE CONFEDERATE SOLDIERS IN THE WAR BETWEEN THE STATES WHO DIED IN ELMIRA PRISON AND LIE BURIED HERE – ERECTED BY THE UNITED DAUGHTERS OF THE CONFEDERACY NOVEMBER 6, 1937

== Aftermath ==
Though the conditions were brutal, they were common in prisons of both the North and the South. Historians still debate on whether that was due to poor management and inadequate supplies, retaliation, or both. Nevertheless, newspapers in the North attempted to downplay the conditions of the camp. The New York Herald denied any mistreatment of prisoners in Elmira, calling the reports a "pure fabrication." To the Herald, all rations at Elmira were sufficient and though it admitted the unusually high incidence of illness in the camp, the newspaper said that the sickness was "beyond the control of the authorities... there is no lack of medical attendance or supplies." The propaganda was so powerful that the belief that the Elmira prison camp was a humane alternative to Andersonville still prevailed in some circles of thought years later.

In a meeting in 1892, John T. Davidson, a captain of the guard detail at the prison, blamed the high mortality rate on the changing weather, water, and manner of living. He also conceded that the horrors of prison-camp life were numerous and a condition that all men should hope to avoid. However, he said, "none of these things can apply, with a shadow of truth, to the prison camp at Elmira."

However, by the end of the war, it could not be disputed that Elmira had taken a considerable toll on the prisoners who came through its doors, with its mortality rate (24.5%) being nearly that of Andersonville (28.7%).

== Historical marker ==
The following marker is set into a flagstone at the prison's location:

CIVIL WAR MONUMENT

Dedicated to the soldiers who trained at Camp Rathbun May 1861 – 1864

and

the Confederate Prisoners of War Incarcerated at Camp Chemung July 1864 – July 1865

Flagstaff Located Inside Main Entrance to the Camp
N.W. Corner of Property at
722 Winsor Ave.

Donated by Paul and Norma Searles

Dedicated under Auspices
Chemung Valley Living History Center Inc.
Mayor James Hare, City of Elmira, N.Y.

May 3, 1992

== Reconstruction ==
On September 11, 2015, work began on reconstructing the only remaining building of the camp. On July 6, 2016, exactly 152 years after the prison received its first prisoners, work began on reconstructing the campsite itself.

== In popular culture ==
Miserable conditions for the prisoners in the camp are depicted in the 1982 miniseries The Blue and the Gray. The prison was also described in With Lee in Virginia.

== See also ==
- American Civil War prison camps
- John W. Jones House
