= Jean-Louis Viel de Saint-Maux =

French writer on architecture and painter

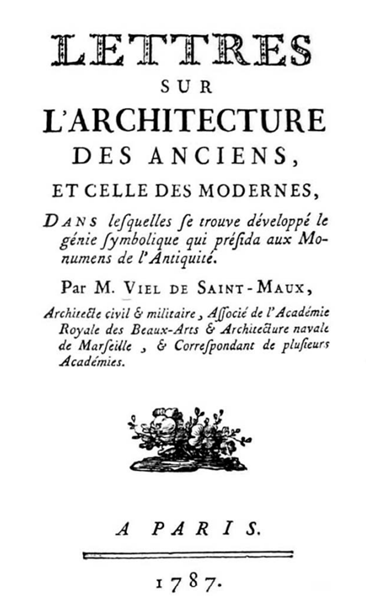
Title page of Lettres sur l'Architecture des Anciens (1787)

Jean-Louis Viel de Saint-Maux (1744?–1795?) was a French painter, lawyer, and writer on architecture. He is known almost exclusively for his Lettres sur l'Architecture des Anciens, et celle des Modernes (1787), in which he argued that architecture, not speech, had been the original communal language of primitive antiquity. He was largely forgotten after his death, but his ideas reached a wide audience when Victor Hugo reworked them, without crediting Viel, in Notre-Dame de Paris.

Earlier scholars mixed-up Viel with the architect Charles-François Viel, who was probably his brother. Jean-Marie Pérouse de Montclos told the two apart in 1966 and gathered what little is known about each. Richard Wittman, and architecture historian, notes that almost everything known about the author of the Lettres comes from remarks in his own works and from a few surviving letters.

== Life ==
Neither Viel's birth nor his death can be dated. His father was Inspector General of Fortifications in Languedoc and gave him a taste for the material relics of the distant past; the two dug together at ancient sites along France's Mediterranean coast. Viel qualified as a painter at the Academy of Painting and Sculpture of Marseille in 1762 and earned his living that way for most of the 1760s, partly in Lyon. In December 1769 he joined the Académie de Saint-Luc as an amateur member.

His patron, the Marquis de Paulmy, then arranged for him to be presented as écuyer (honorary title) and avocat (lawyer) in Parlement of Paris. Viel also bought one of the three offices of maître général des Bâtiments du Roi, a post that settled quarrels in the building trades, but a lawsuit deprived him of it within about eighteen months.

In Paris during the 1770s and 1780s Viel wrote on architecture, the history of languages, ancient religion, and other subjects, without giving up painting; a miniature portrait of Charles-André van Loo by him hung at the 1774 Salon. In 1780 his name appears, as "M. Viel, Architecte & Avocat en Parlement", on the subscription list for Antoine Court de Gébelin's Monde primitif, a book that strongly shaped his thinking. The two men were probably acquainted, since both belonged to the Masonic lodge Les Neuf Sœurs. He added "de Saint-Maux" to his name only in the mid-1780s, apparently because of his standing as écuyer; before that he signed himself Jean Viel or Jean-Louis Viel.

The last record of him is from 1790, when he and a collaborator named Sergent put forward a "Projet d'un monument à la gloire de Louis XVI".

== Works ==
The earliest of the letters later gathered into the Lettres sur l'Architecture came out as a pamphlet in 1779, followed by others in 1780 and 1785. The year 1785 also brought the Observations Philosophiques sur l'usage d'exposer les Ouvrages de Peinture & de Sculpture and, without his name on it, the Dissertation sur les cornes antiques et modernes. The full Lettres sur l'Architecture des Anciens, et celle des Modernes followed in 1787, its title page styling him "Architecte civil & militaire". He also drafted, but never printed, several further texts, among them an Essai sur la marche progressive des Sciences et des Arts and an art-historical Essai sur les Artistes.

Viel started from the conviction that the ancient and modern worlds had nothing in common, and that Europeans since the Renaissance had misread antiquity entirely. As he saw it, the surviving evidence pointed to a single shared civilization across the whole globe, at its purest in the earliest times but still recognisable down to the modern age. For the world outside Europe he relied on travellers' reports, above all Engelbert Kaempfer on Japan and Richard Pococke on the Middle East; his account of early society rested chiefly on Court de Gébelin, who had described rural communities whose supreme deity was nature itself, worshipped in the Sun and Moon.

His boldest claim was that architecture, not the spoken word, had been the first shared language of early humanity. The close unity of those societies, he held, let them set down common knowledge in columns, stele, menhirs, altars, and buildings, and in the signs and emblems carved on them. He therefore rejected the Vitruvian account that placed the origin of architecture in a primitive hut. Any genuine ancient author, he reasoned, would have located that origin in the sacred, in the altar rather than the hut, so Vitruvius's treatise was a later fabrication. Buildings had served antiquity as the public record of its shared memory; speech and painting branched off from this first language only later, as the early unity broke down. Greek and Roman classical architecture descended directly from those old menhirs and altars and still carried their meaning, which vanished only with the Renaissance. Viel rejected the modern concern with a building's measurements and proportions, which he thought empty once cut off from any deeper sense, and he blamed printing for the loss of the old symbolic understanding.

The Observations Philosophiques sets out the same view. There Viel held that the showing of artworks was an ancient and once worldwide custom, and he attacked printed art criticism as driven by money and ignorant of its subject.

== Influence ==
Although his name faded after the 18th century, Viel's ideas had a long influence, because Victor Hugo, apparently with help from the architect Henri Labrouste, took them over, without crediting Viel, in the chapters on architecture in Notre-Dame de Paris (1831). Those chapters trace the shift from an age of architecture to an age of printing. Hugo read that shift as progress, while Viel had read it as decline, but the framework and much of the detail came directly from the Lettres. Hugo's treatment then supplied the basis for Frank Lloyd Wright's 1901 lecture and essay "The Art and Craft of the Machine", which treated the printing press as the model machine and urged architecture to accept the machine age. Wright's purpose was nothing like Viel's, but one idea carried through: that architecture is shaped by wider cultural, technical, and social forces beyond the control of the architect.

== Sources ==
- Guiffrey, Jules (1872). Livrets des expositions de l'Académie de Saint-Luc à Paris pendant les années 1751, 1752, 1753, 1756, 1762, 1764, et 1774 [Exhibition booklets of the Academy of Saint Luke in Paris during the years 1751, 1752, 1753, 1756, 1762, 1764, and 1774] (in French). Paris: Baur et Détaille.
- Mantion, Jean-Rémy (1984). "La solution symbolique: Les Lettres sur l'architecture de Viel de Saint-Maux (1787)" [The symbolic solution: The Letters on Architecture by Viel de Saint-Maux (1787)]. Urbi (in French). 9: 46–58.
- Pérouse de Montclos, Jean-Marie (1966). "Charles-François Viel, Architecte de l'Hôpital général et Jean-Louis Viel de Saint-Maux, Architecte, peintre et avocat au Parlement de Paris" [Charles-François Viel, Architect of the General Hospital and Jean-Louis Viel de Saint-Maux, Architect, painter and lawyer at the Parliament of Paris]. Bulletin de la société d'histoire de l'art français (in French): 257–269.
- Saisselin, Rémy G. (1983). "Painting, Writing and Primitive Purity: From Expression to Sign in Eighteenth-Century French Painting and Architecture". Studies on Voltaire and the Eighteenth Century. 217: 257–369.
- Ungureanu, Cosmin (2016). "Viel de Saint-Maux and the Symbolism of Primitive Architecture" (PDF). Revue Roumaine d'Histoire de l'Art, Série Beaux-Arts. 53: 129–136.
- Vidler, Anthony (1987). The Writing of the Walls. New York: Princeton Architectural Press.
- Winterton, David (1999). "Architecture and the Vegetal Soul". Chora. 3: 255–280.
- Wittman, Richard (2007). "The Hut and the Altar: Architectural Origins and the Public Sphere in Eighteenth-Century France". Studies in Eighteenth-Century Culture. 36: 235–259.
- Wittman, Richard (2007). Architecture, Print Culture, and the Public Sphere in Eighteenth-Century France. London: Routledge.
- Wittman, Richard. "Jean-Louis Viel de Saint-Maux (1744?–1795?)". The Super-Enlightenment: A Digital Archive. Stanford University Libraries.
