= John W. Jones (ex-slave) =

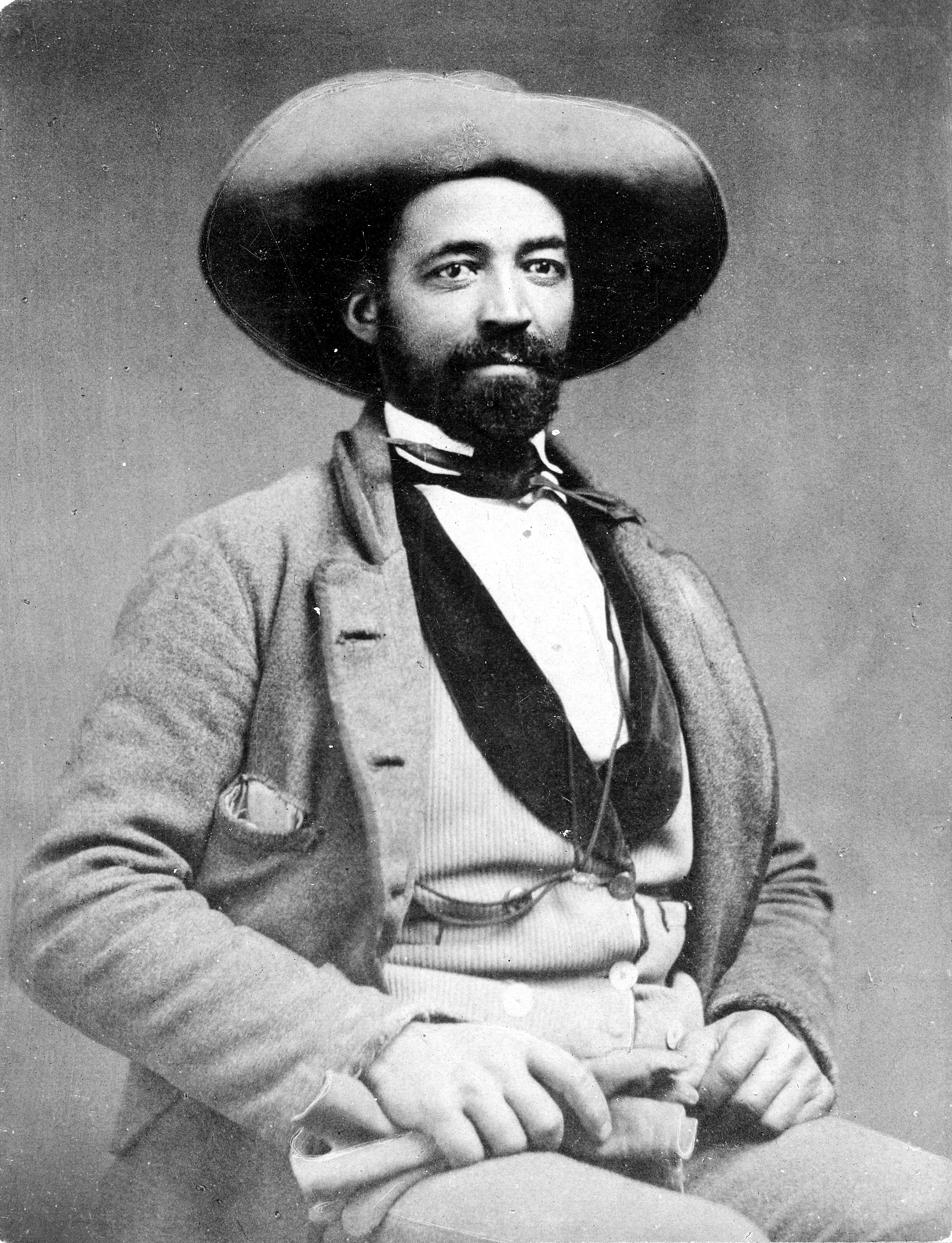
- Born: June 21, 1817; Leesburg, Virginia
- Died: December 26, 1900 (aged 83); Elmira, New York
- Resting place: Woodlawn Cemetery
- Occupation: Sexton
- Known for: Conductor on the Underground Railroad
- Spouse: Rachel Jones (née Swails)

John W. Jones (June 21, 1817 – December 26, 1900), was born on a plantation in Leesburg, Virginia, he was enslaved by the Ellzey family. Jones is buried in Woodlawn National Cemetery, not far from Mark Twain. He was married to Rachel Jones (née Swails) in 1856, with whom he had three sons and one daughter. On June 3, 1844, fearing he would be sold to another plantation, as his owner grew old and near death, Jones and four others fled north. They survived a 300-mile trip and arrived in Elmira, New York in July 1844. In Elmira, Jones was an active agent in the Underground Railroad.

== Slave life and escape ==
As a youngster, Jones was the houseboy of William Ellzey's daughter, Miss Sally. Miss Sarah (Sally) Ellzey was fond of John and was a good friend to him. But she was getting on in years, and John was concerned about what would happen to him once she died. On June 3, 1844, he left with his two half-brothers, George and Charles, along with Jefferson Brown and John Smith, who were enslaved people at a nearby estate. They followed the Underground Railroad that went through Williamsport, Canton, Alba and South Creek.

While fleeing, Jones and his companions fought off slave hunters in Maryland and made their way into the free state of Pennsylvania. They continued heading north and took refuge in New York in a barn on South Creek Farm owned by Dr. Nathaniel Smith. Mrs. Smith found the exhausted and hungry fugitives and cared for them until they could continue their journey. Jones is believed to have been so grateful that after she died, flowers mysteriously appeared on her grave until Jones died. The five men reached Elmira on July 5, 1844.

== Underground Railroad ==
Jones' adopted home of Elmira was a major stop for the Underground Railroad. Most of the people who were escaping slavery that passed through came via Harrisburg and Williamsport, continuing their route to Rochester or another "station." Elmira's participation in the Underground Railroad was significant due to its location between Philadelphia and St. Catharines, Ontario; the final destination for many escaping slavery. At one point in July 1845, 17 people who were escaping slavery were in the Elmira area, hiding on farms and at other places.

The completion of the Northern Central Railway after 1850 further escalated Elmira's contribution to the Underground Railroad. The new railway allowed people who were escaping slavery to hide in baggage cars, making their journey quicker and easier.

Jones became an active agent in the Underground Railroad in 1851. By 1860, Jones aided in the escape of 860 people who had been enslaved. He usually received the fugitives in parties of six to ten, but there were times he found shelter for up to 30 men, women, and children a night. It is believed Jones sheltered many in his own home behind First Baptist Church. Of those 860, none were captured or returned to the South.

In 1854 the tracks from Williamsport to Elmira were completed. Jones made an arrangement with Northern Central employees and hid the fugitives in the 4 o'clock "Freedom Baggage Car," directly to Niagara Falls via Watkins Glen and Canandaigua. Most of Jones's "baggage" eventually landed in St. Catharine's.

== Employment ==
Some of his early jobs in Elmira included chopping wood, working in a candle shop, and cleaning as a janitor for Miss Clara Thurston's school for young ladies on Main Street.

=== Sexton at First Baptist ===
Jones became the sexton of Elmira's First Baptist Church in 1847 and purchased a house next to the church for $500 (~$17,277 in 2025). During this time, Jones kept a record of the church's dead buried at the Second Street Cemetery.

In the days when he was sexton of the First Baptist Church, there was no paid fire department. As was the practice, a volunteer fireman would rush to Jones' little "yellow house" to rout him out to go to the church and ring the bells to summon the other volunteers. After other churches obtained bells, there became a contest to see which sexton could be the first to ring the alarm. A $2.00 fee was paid by the fireman to the sexton whose bell rang first. Jones generally won the contest by cleverly attaching one end of a rope to the bell clapper and the other end to his bed post.

Jones continued to serve as sexton for First Baptist Church for 43 years.

=== Burial of Confederate soldiers ===
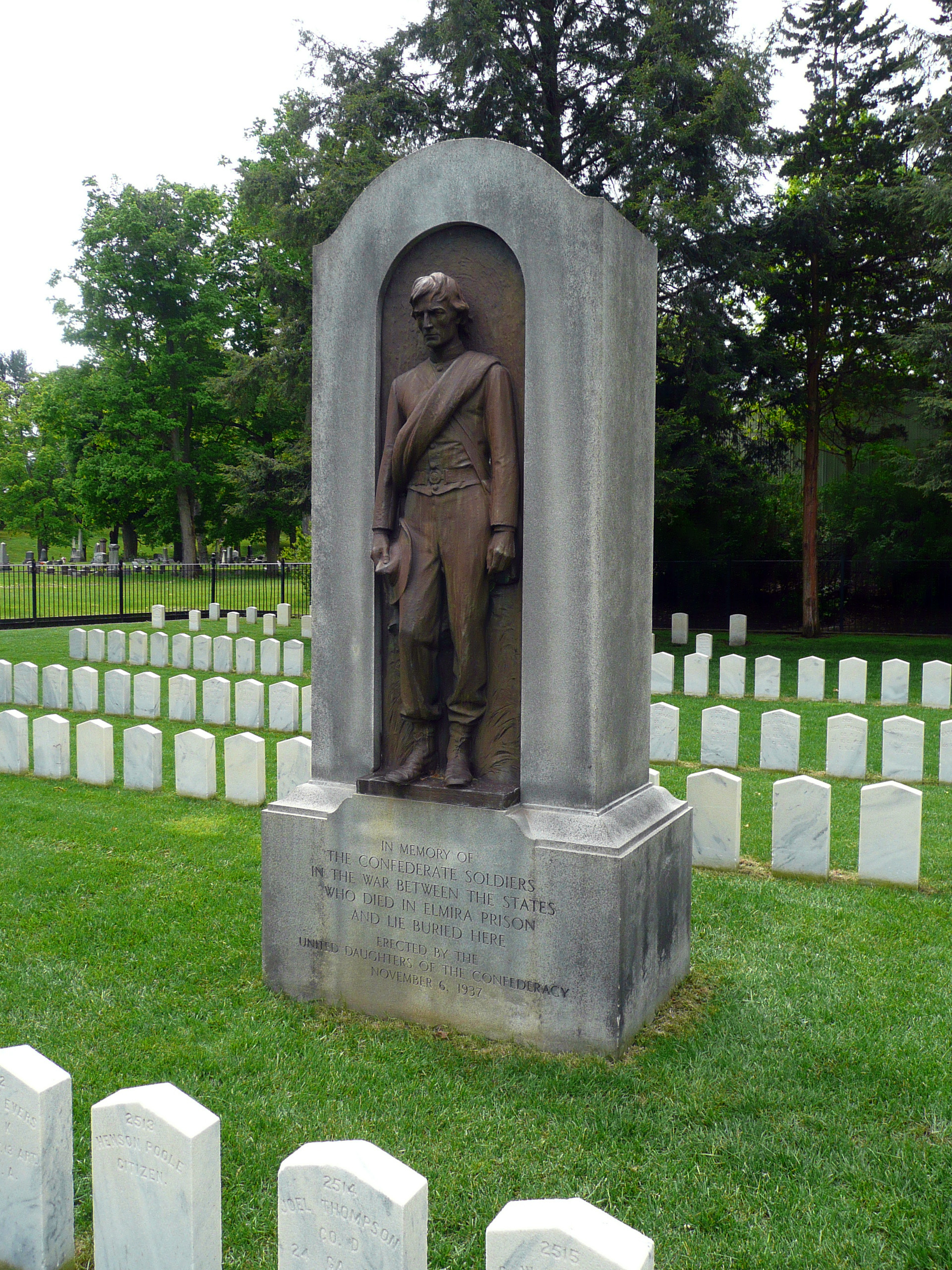
Confederate memorial at Woodlawn National Cemetery

During the Civil War, he buried the Confederate dead from the Elmira Prison Camp at Woodlawn National Cemetery. Of the 2,963 prisoners who Jones buried, only seven are listed as unknown. Jones kept such precise records that on December 7, 1877, the federal government declared the burial site a national cemetery. His extensive records allowed the federal government to place accurate headstones on all but seven of the 2,973 Confederate graves in 1907.

Each coffin was clearly marked with any information that the soldier had been willing to share; the information also was placed in a sealed bottle inside the coffin. Any valuables owned by the soldier at the time of his death were carefully cataloged and stored. The graves were identified with wooden markers and arranged in a pattern that suggested soldiers lined up for inspection. They were surrounded by the graves of Union soldiers, grouped as though they were still on guard. When the families received the precious family photographs, treasures, letters, and remembrances that Jones had kept for them, they were so moved that only three bodies were removed for reburial.

When the son of the Ellzeys' overseer, John R. Rollins, died at the prison camp, Jones arranged to send the body back to the family. And a few years after the war, Jones returned to the Ellzey plantation and was warmly received.

Jones received $2.50 from the government for each Confederate soldier buried. This money eventually enabled him to buy his College Avenue farm and to be rated as the wealthiest Black man in this part of the state. The John W. Jones House still stands at a Davis Street location on the original farm property.

== Personal life ==
John was married to Rachel Jones (née Swails), the sister of Stephen Atkins Swails, in 1856; they had three sons and one daughter together. One of his sons, George Henry Jones, died on October 20, 1864, at only three years of age.
