= Pavilion hospital =

Type of hospital layout

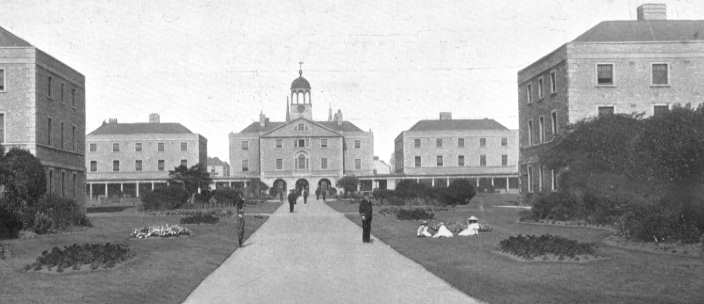
Royal Naval Hospital (1758–1765), Stonehouse, Plymouth

A pavilion hospital is a functional and spatial organization of hospitals that emerged in the 18th century and became widespread in the 19th century. The principle was to distribute different functional units or hospital services across several buildings, known as "pavilions". This layout, which promotes air renewal and circulation, also made it possible to isolate wards and diseases, thus addressing the hygienist concerns that arose from advances in medicine.

One of the earliest pavilion hospitals in England is the Royal Naval Hospital, Stonehouse, near Plymouth, built from 1758. In France, the first was the Hôpital de la Marine de Rochefort, opened in 1788.

This organizational model spread mainly during the 19th century—notably with the construction in Paris of Lariboisière Hospital, opened in 1854—and reached its culmination in Lyon with Hôpital Édouard-Herriot, built by Tony Garnier between 1911 and 1933. In the United States, pavilion hospitals were constructed in large numbers from the 1860s.

From the 1930s onward, a new model, the block hospital, became dominant.

== Origins ==
The pavilion system has military origins. In France, since the time of Sébastien Le Prestre de Vauban (1633–1707), garrison troops were housed in separate and isolated buildings, making it easier to contain fires caused by artillery during sieges.

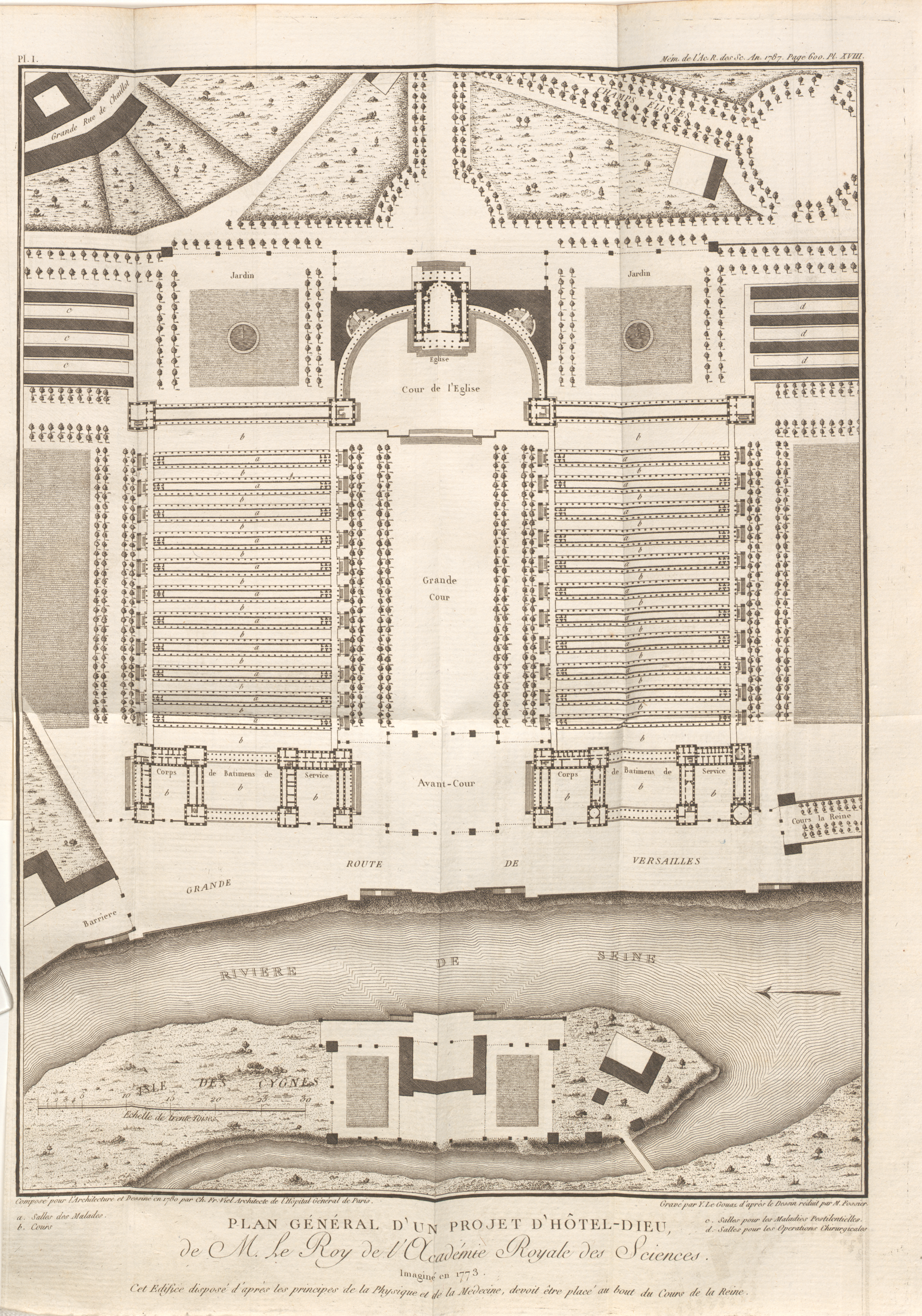
General plan of a new Hôtel-Dieu in the Chaillot district of Paris, by Charles-François Viel based on an idea by Jean-Baptiste Le Roy: 11 buildings aligned on either side of a large courtyard.

In the 18th century, this arrangement appeared best suited to preventing contagious diseases according to the miasma theory. Unlike medieval hospitals that gathered patients in stagnant air, the aim was no longer to purify air through fires or fumigation, but to renew it through circulation. This "aerist" doctrine was based on controlling airflows to eliminate contagion.

=== United Kingdom ===
In England, it was James Lind (1716–1794), an administrator of the Royal Navy, who recommended these principles, not only in naval hygiene but also in hospital hygiene:

"What I have said concerning the bad air of ships must also apply to all hospitals in general; it is far better to have the sick camp under tents near the hospital than to let them infect one another; this is the only method of preventing the communication of their disease." (Essay on the Most Effectual Means of Preserving the Health of Seamen, Paris, 1758).

The first reference model implementing one of the basic principles (a hospital composed of units in separate and independent buildings) is the Royal Naval Hospital, Stonehouse, built between 1758 and 1764 near Plymouth., It reflects the model of the tent (military encampment) or the island (archipelago), which strongly influenced the imagination of physicians and architects of that time.

=== France ===
In France, a major event was the fire that destroyed much of the Hôtel-Dieu de Paris on the night of 29–30 December 1772. This disaster sparked a nationwide debate lasting about fifteen years and led to the emergence of pavilion hospital planning. Around forty reconstruction projects were proposed, most based on aerist doctrine: buildings arranged in grids with enclosed courtyards or gardens, inspired by Hôpital Saint-Louis, or circular layouts such as the star-shaped design proposed by Antoine Petit (1722–1794).

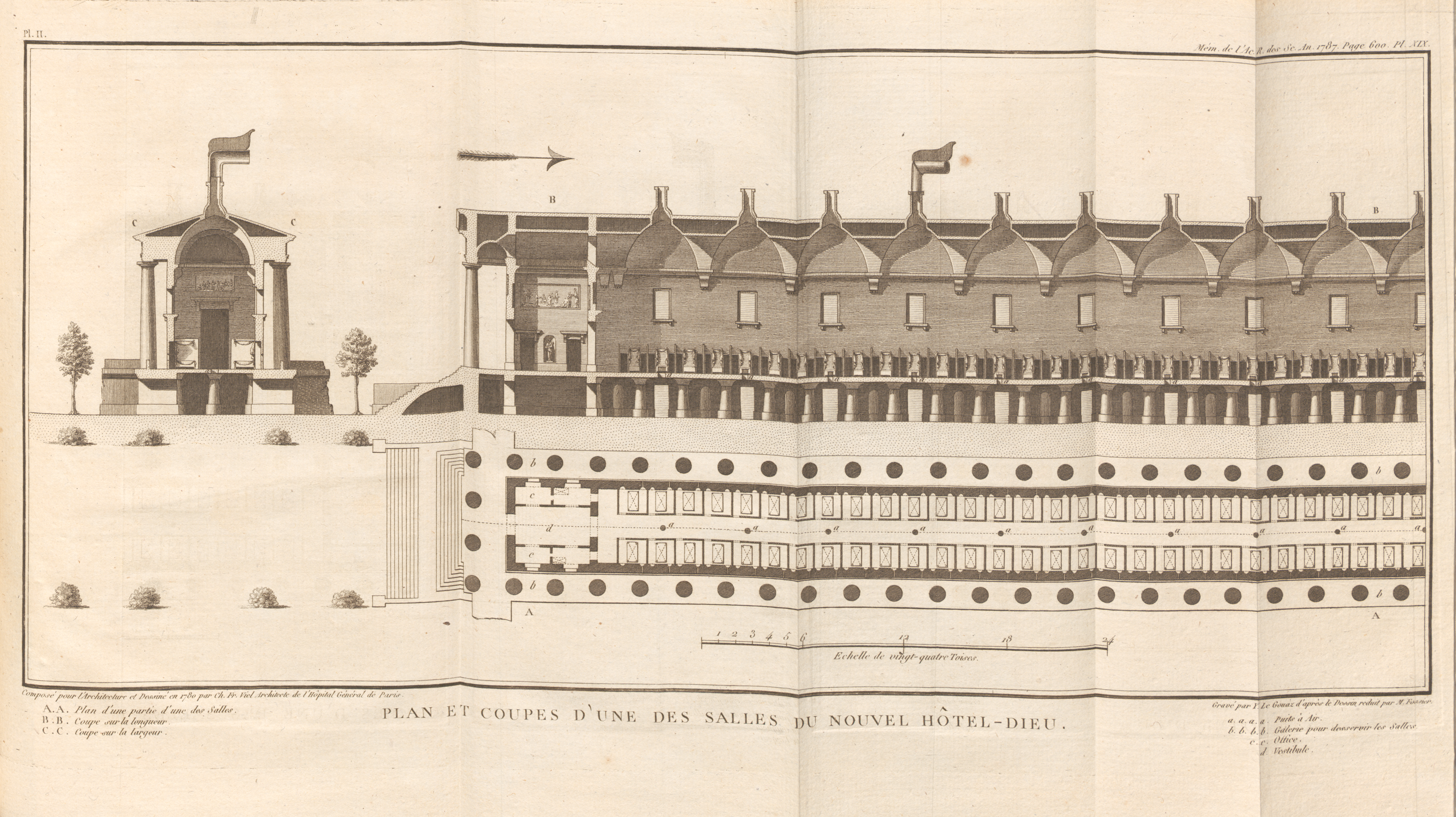
Section of a building showing ventilation systems: raised ground floor above a crawl space, with ventilation chimneys in the ceiling.

The physicist Jean-Baptiste Le Roy (1720–1800) was among the first to propose isolated pavilion systems in 1777. His design included high and low ventilation openings to encourage upward air renewal, aiming to limit horizontal air movement "to prevent miasmas from passing from one bed to another." The debate was settled by a commission of the French Academy of Sciences between 1786 and 1788, following study trips across Europe. The Stonehouse hospital served as a reference model. A monumental circular project by Bernard Poyet (1742–1824) was rejected, but a revised plan aligned with the commission's recommendations was presented in Jacques Tenon's influential Mémoire sur les hôpitaux de Paris (1788). On the eve of the French Revolution, all large unified hospital designs were rejected in favor of fragmented "hospital in pieces" concepts.

This debate was ultimately settled by a commission of the French Academy of Sciences between 1786 and 1788, following study trips across Europe, during which the Stonehouse hospital was taken as the reference model. An initial project for a colossal circular hospital, proposed by Bernard Poyet (1742–1824), was rejected in 1786, but Poyet submitted another plan in line with the Academy's recommendations, presented in the famous memoir by Jacques Tenon (1724–1816), Mémoire sur les hôpitaux de Paris (1788).

On the eve of the French Revolution, all projects for a massive, spatially unified hospital were rejected as archaic or incompetent. Under the auspices of the Academy, physicians and architects embraced the idea of a "fragmented hospital", one that was uniform in concept yet divided into separate units.

== Pavilion systems ==
In France, the first pavilion hospital was the Hôpital de la Marine de Rochefort, rebuilt from 1781 and opened in 1788. Initially planned as a complex of ten buildings, six of which were to be separate from one another, it was reduced to eight buildings for budgetary reasons, with one building housing a surgical school and an anatomical amphitheater.

=== Tenon system ===
The French Revolution interrupted the planned hospital program, and major construction works did not resume until after 1830. Thus, the reconstruction of the Hôtel-Dieu de Paris only began in 1867. Poyet's original 1788 project provided for two rows of seven buildings aligned on either side of a large central courtyard, forming a strictly symmetrical structure known as the "double comb" layout. This system, presented in the memoir of Jacques Tenon, was adopted as a basic principle—known as the "Tenon system"—throughout the 19th century in hospital construction and reconstruction.

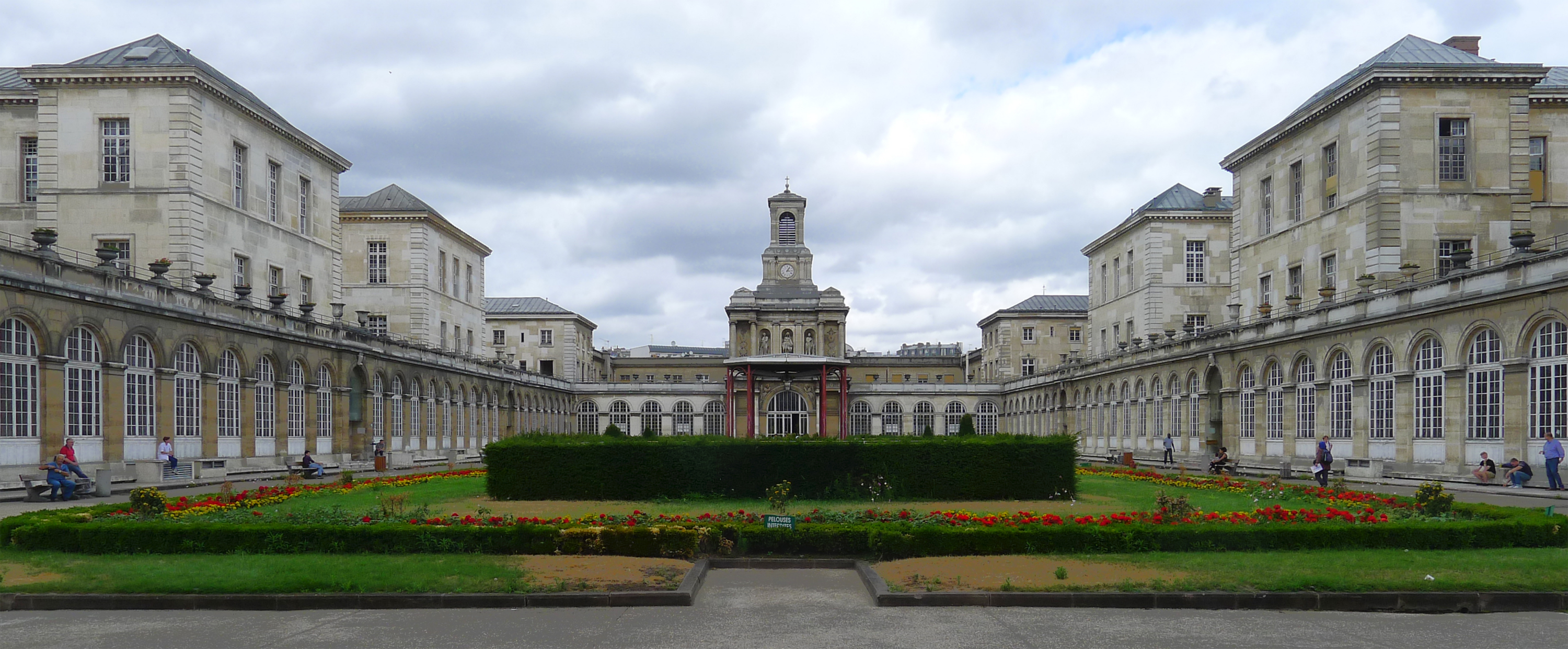
Lariboisière Hospital: central courtyard with chapel between pavilion wings forming a “double comb”.

Among civilian hospitals, the double-comb layout can be observed, or was once observed, in Hôpital Saint-André in Bordeaux (1826–1829); in the hospice of La Reconnaissance in Garches (1835–1843), now Raymond-Poincaré Hospital; in the former Beaujon Hospital (1835–1844) in Paris's 8th arrondissement; in the Hôtel-Dieu d'Orléans (1844); in the Hôtel-Dieu de Nantes (1863), considered one of the finest examples of the double-comb type, though destroyed by bombing in 1943; and in the Hôpital de la Conception in Marseille (1858–1863), demolished and rebuilt at the end of the 20th century.

Among military hospitals, examples include those in Bayonne (1834–1841), now the Lycée professionnel Paul-Bert, and in Vincennes (1855–1858), now the Hôpital d'instruction des armées Bégin in Saint-Mandé. Owing to the simplicity of its design, the Vincennes hospital was regarded by contemporaries as the "egg of Columbus" of hospital architecture: two three-story patient pavilions frame a garden, while a third, perpendicular building houses general services, forming an open U-shape that met ventilation requirements.

The most notable example of the double-comb type is the Lariboisière Hospital in Paris, inaugurated in 1854. It is strictly symmetrical, consisting of ten three-story wings—five on each side—arranged around a central courtyard focused on a chapel.

=== Tollet system ===
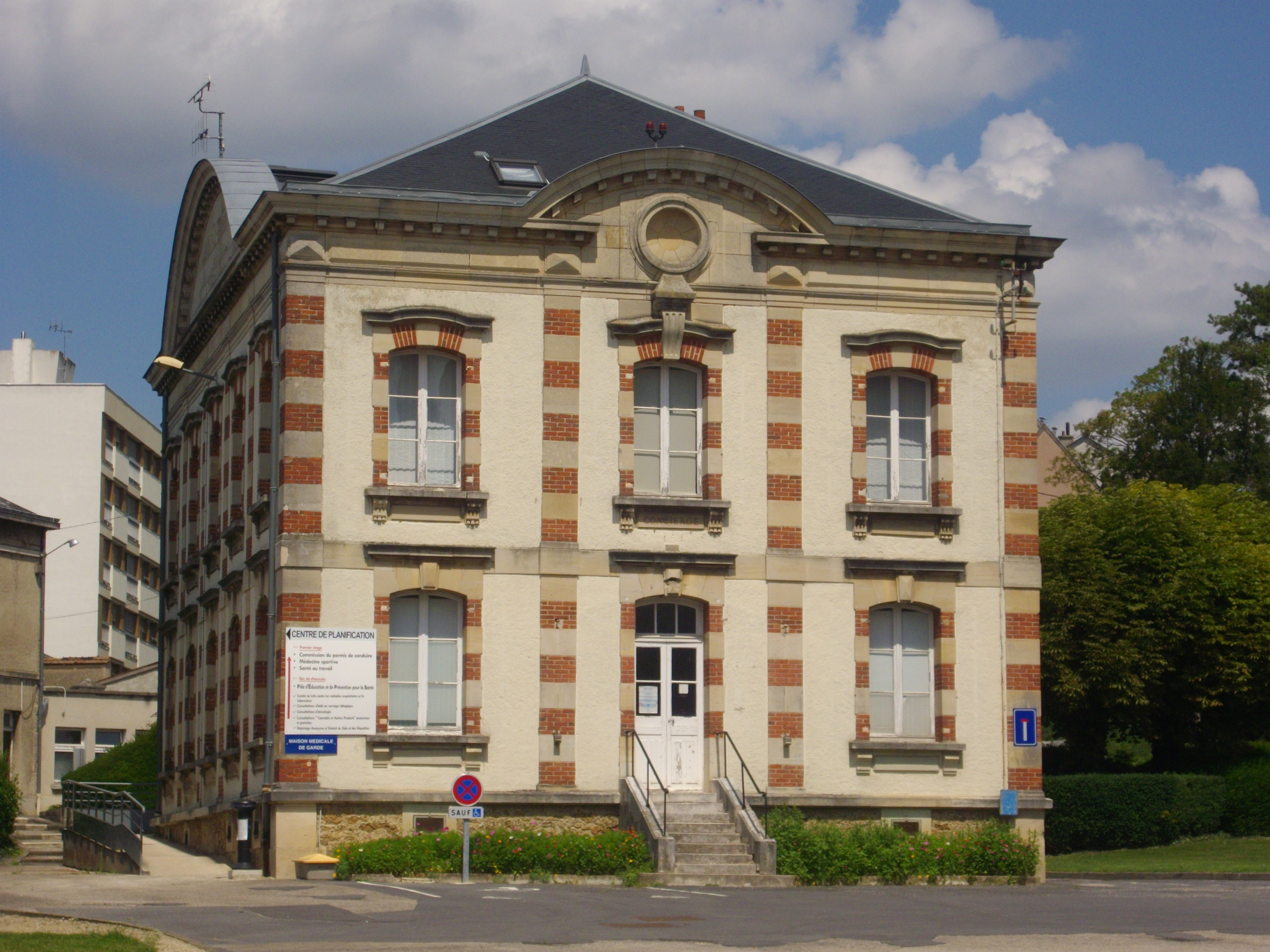
Pavilion of the Auban-Moët Hospital in Épernay.

From the 1860s onward, the Tenon model came under criticism: single-story pavilions were advocated, with the ground floor separated from the upper level, and construction using plaster and iron, allowing buildings to remain cooler in summer and better heated in winter. In 1872, after the defeat of 1871, military engineer Casimir Tollet (1828–1899) promoted a system of small, single-story pavilions with false metal vaults fitted with ventilation chimneys. Examples of this system include the military hospital of Bourges (Baudens Hospital) and the hospital-hospice of Épernay (Auban-Moët Hospital).,

In the 1880s, Tollet was regarded by his contemporaries as one of the last defenders of "aerism" through the dispersion of miasmas, even described as an "ultra-Tenonian". He sought to impose his system everywhere, criticizing others that were similar but differed in detail (such as fully isolated small pavilions). He notably criticized German hospitals, including the civil and military hospital of Berlin, the hospital of Heidelberg, the military hospital of Königsberg, and the new hospital of Hamburg.

=== Florence Nightingale and the Franco-British debate ===
In the 1860s, British observers noted that new hospitals had lower mortality rates than older ones, but that these rates tended to increase again over time. The famous nurse Florence Nightingale (1820–1919), founder of nursing as a scientific discipline, suggested demolishing and rebuilding hospitals every ten or twelve years, which was not economically feasible.

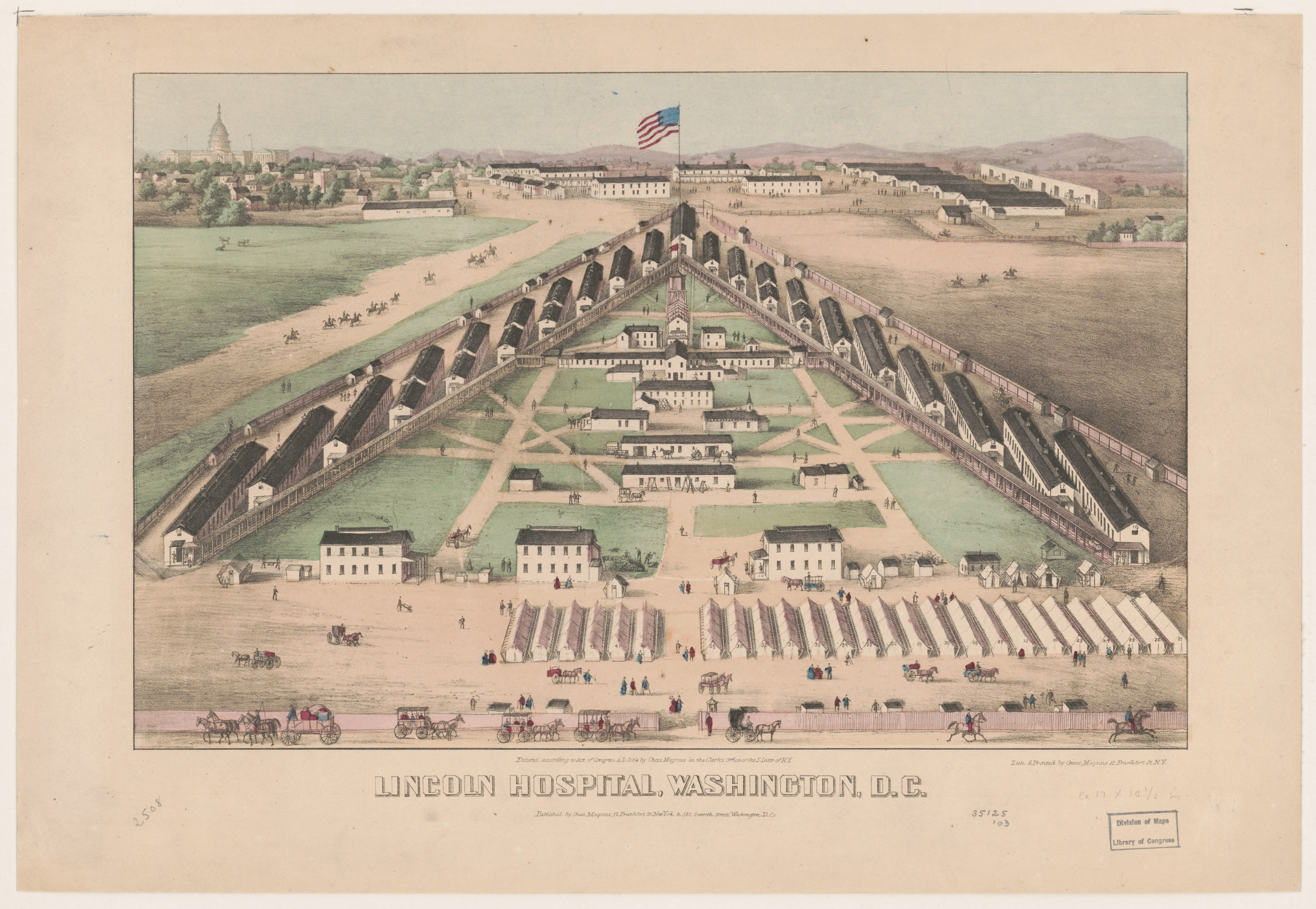
Lincoln Hospital in Washington, D.C., lithograph, 1864.

Nightingale advocated ward-pavilions (single-ward pavilions), which she considered the healthiest form of hospital structure within the framework of aerist theories. These pavilion wards were easier to clean and ventilate. During the reconstruction of St Thomas' Hospital in London (the medieval hospital having to make way for a new railway station), she proposed relocating it more than 15 miles away to a suburban area. This proposal was rejected, but she succeeded in securing pavilion wards and a nursing school for the new hospital built on the south bank of the River Thames..

Nightingale's principles inspired the design of the Lincoln Hospital in Washington, D.C., organized into 21 pavilions arranged in a V-shape around administrative and service buildings.. This temporary military hospital (1862–1865), used during the American Civil War, was located on part of what is now Lincoln Park (Washington, D.C.) and was demolished at the end of the war.

The pavilion system, particularly that of small pavilions, was criticized for requiring too much space, as each pavilion needed large open areas to ensure proper ventilation. Savings in construction costs were offset by the expense of acquiring and maintaining land (courtyards and gardens).

Hospital hygiene became a widely debated issue on both sides of the English Channel, with English and French publications responding to one another. According to Pierre-Louis Laget: "Emulation feeds on comparisons, mutual disparagement, claims of superiority or, conversely, envious views of the other." Each commentator tended to adopt from abroad only what supported their own arguments. For example, Armand Husson (1809–1874), director of public assistance in 1859, extensively cited Nightingale's Notes on Hospitals when she praised Lariboisière Hospital, while omitting the criticisms she also expressed.

== Apogee and decline ==
The pavilion system reached its peak even as its theoretical foundations (miasma theory and aerism) were being called into question. As noted, "the hospital architect of 1880 scarcely knew any longer where to guide his steps."

=== Changes in hygiene ===
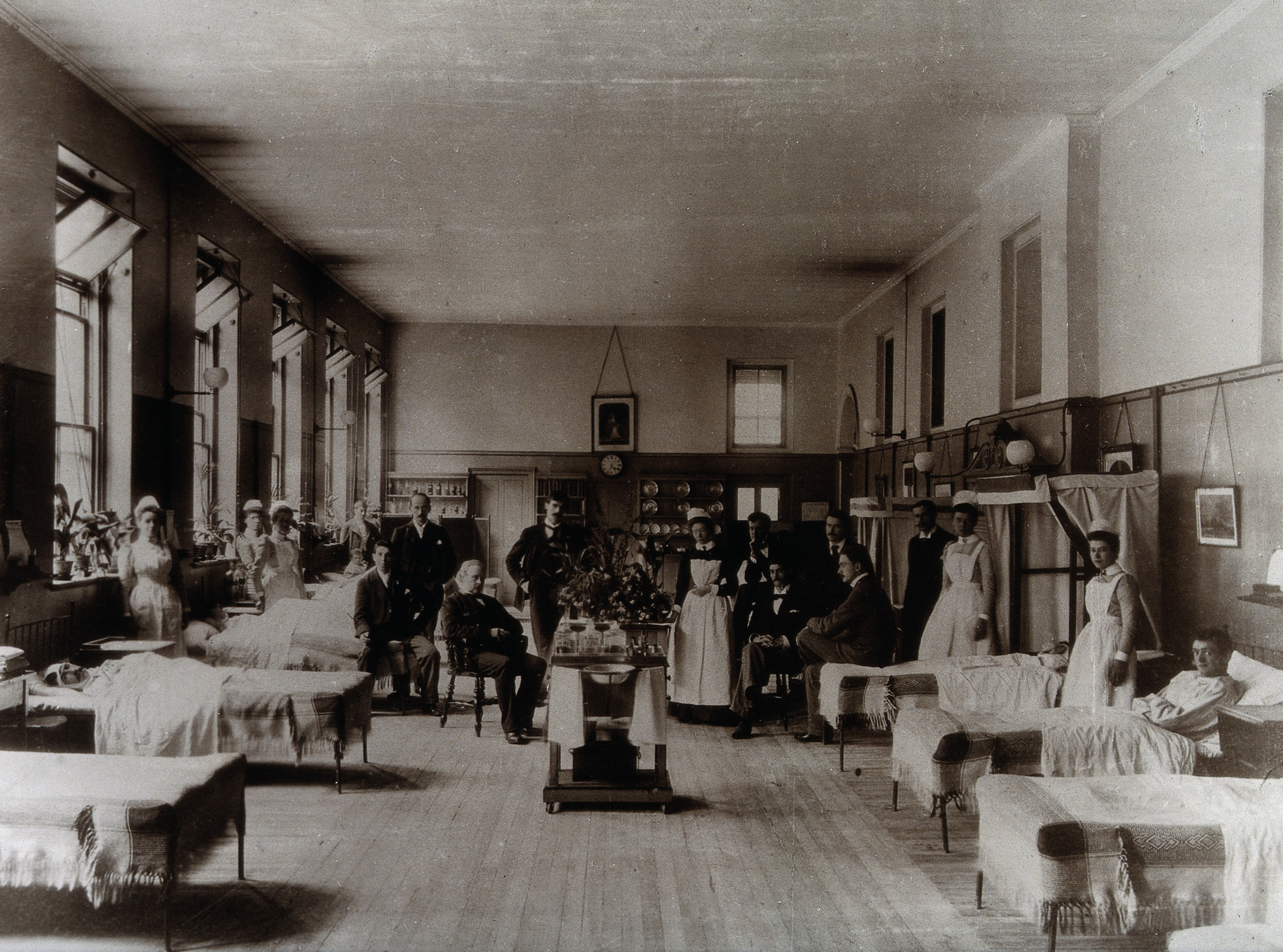
Joseph Lister (seated, left) with his team at King's College Hospital, London, 1893.

According to miasmatic theory, infections or "wound fevers" were caused by the immediate air environment surrounding the patient; prevention relied on ventilation and avoiding overcrowding (the ratio of patients to room volume). Following empirical observations—interpreted through statistics—such as those of Ignaz Semmelweis (1818–1865), and the work of Louis Pasteur (1822–1895) and Joseph Lister (1827–1912), antiseptic and aseptic practices became increasingly established. Wound infection came to be seen as dependent on the surgeon: the cleanliness of their hands, the sterilization of instruments, and the asepsis of the surgical field. By the end of the 19th century, all surgeons wore gowns, masks, and gloves.

According to the surgeon Just Lucas-Championnière (1843–1913): "In surgery, the question of the premises is extraordinarily secondary." In hospitals, architectural design became less important than the internal organization of care. Buildings once considered inadequate could function effectively, while those previously regarded as exemplary were later modified in ways that contradicted the theories of their time.

Followers of Pasteur demonstrated the illusory nature of isolation achieved in contagious-disease pavilions, particularly for children. Transmission depended less on air than on direct contact between patients or indirect contact via caregivers or objects.

These new ideas met with resistance, and the Aristotelian doctrine declined only gradually. Hygienists sought to avoid too radical a break by reconciling the two theories: while miasma was a myth, it could be embodied in a microbe as a "figurative miasma", and airborne transmission remained possible. Aerist hospitals continued to be built into the 1930s. The pavilion system persisted as an architectural type even as medical elites, from the turn of the 20th century onward, lost interest in hospital construction and architecture.

=== Realizations ===
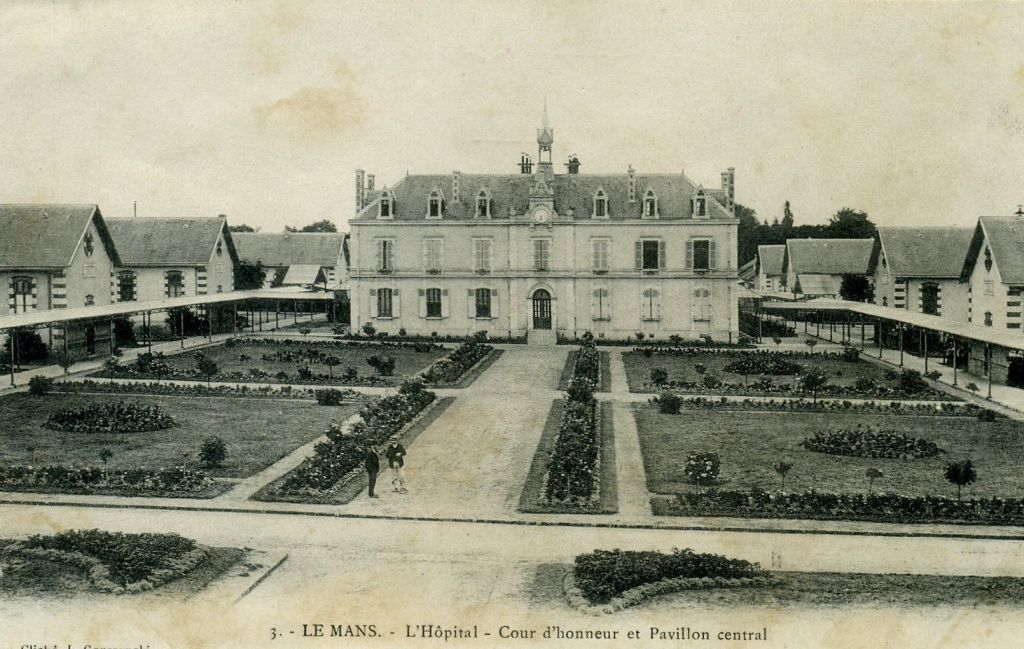
Hospital-hospice of Le Mans: central pavilion and main courtyard surrounded by patient pavilions.

The Tollet system appeared to be suited to new microbiological requirements, with variations such as the west–east or north–south orientation of patient pavilions; isolation pavilions for contagious patients in shared wards, two-bed rooms, or individual cubicles; the presence or absence of galleries linking the pavilions, either above ground or underground; and pavilions with a ground floor only or with an additional story.

Examples include the hospital-hospice of Saint-Denis, inaugurated in 1881 (now the Centre hospitalier de Saint-Denis), the civil hospital of Oran, whose plans were presented at the 1878 Exposition Universelle, the hospital of Ménilmontant (now Tenon Hospital), the hospital of Vichy (1887), the hospital-hospice of Le Havre (1885), and the hospital-hospice of Le Mans (1891).

The Hôpital Boucicaut in Paris, inaugurated in 1897, represents the apogee of the pavilion system, applying a synthesis of aerist doctrines. It was inspired by the German hospital of Hamburg-Eppendorf.

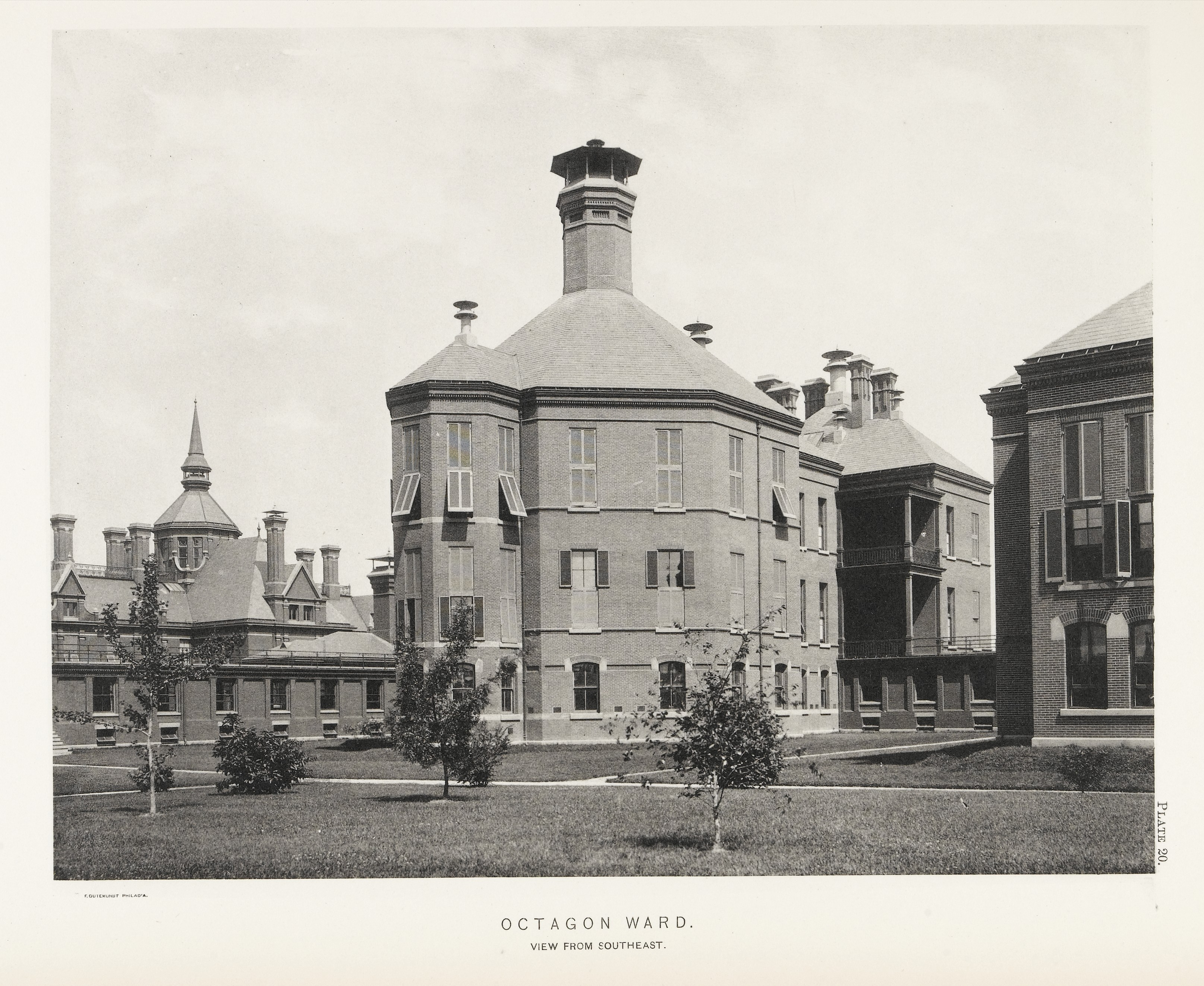
Octagonal pavilion ward at Johns Hopkins Hospital in Baltimore, with a central ventilation chimney on the roof.

The Pasteurian doctrine, "finally freed from the constraints of aerist dogma," took shape in the Pasteur Hospital, inaugurated in 1900 (the medical center of the Pasteur Institute in Paris). Originally, it consisted of two two-story pavilions for contagious children, with a total of 58 beds, each in strictly isolated individual rooms. Individual isolation was considered more important than air volume in wards or the physical separation between pavilions.

=== National variations ===
The French pavilion system is an example of "French-style" architecture, in which the idea of composition based on symmetry predominates, expressing order and rigor.

Other architectural types exist, particularly in the Anglosphere, where the concept of orientation takes precedence: the aim is to adapt organically to air and sunlight so that all parts of the hospital benefit equally. Pavilions are then arranged in "fishbone" patterns or branching layouts connected to a common axis. For example, the hospital in Antwerp (1885) employed a system of circular pavilion wards, while the Johns Hopkins Hospital in Baltimore (1889) featured octagonal pavilion wards..

== End of the system ==
=== Rise of the block hospital ===
The block hospital emerged in the 1890s in the United States, where the pavilion model was no longer dominant. A precursor was the St. Louis State Hospital in St. Louis (Missouri), built in 1869 with five stories. Subsequently, the skyscraper phenomenon influenced hospital architecture: from the Bethany Medical Center in Kansas City (1905), with ten stories, to the New York Hospital (1932), with 21 stories.

American influence, incorporating the Pasteurian revolution alongside new construction techniques, was expressed through the American Hospital Association, which organized international conferences from 1927 onward, with support from the Rockefeller Foundation. The foundations of the pavilion model were undermined by both practical considerations (the distances required to reach separate pavilions) and economic factors (the excessive land use in the centers of large cities).

=== Last major examples ===
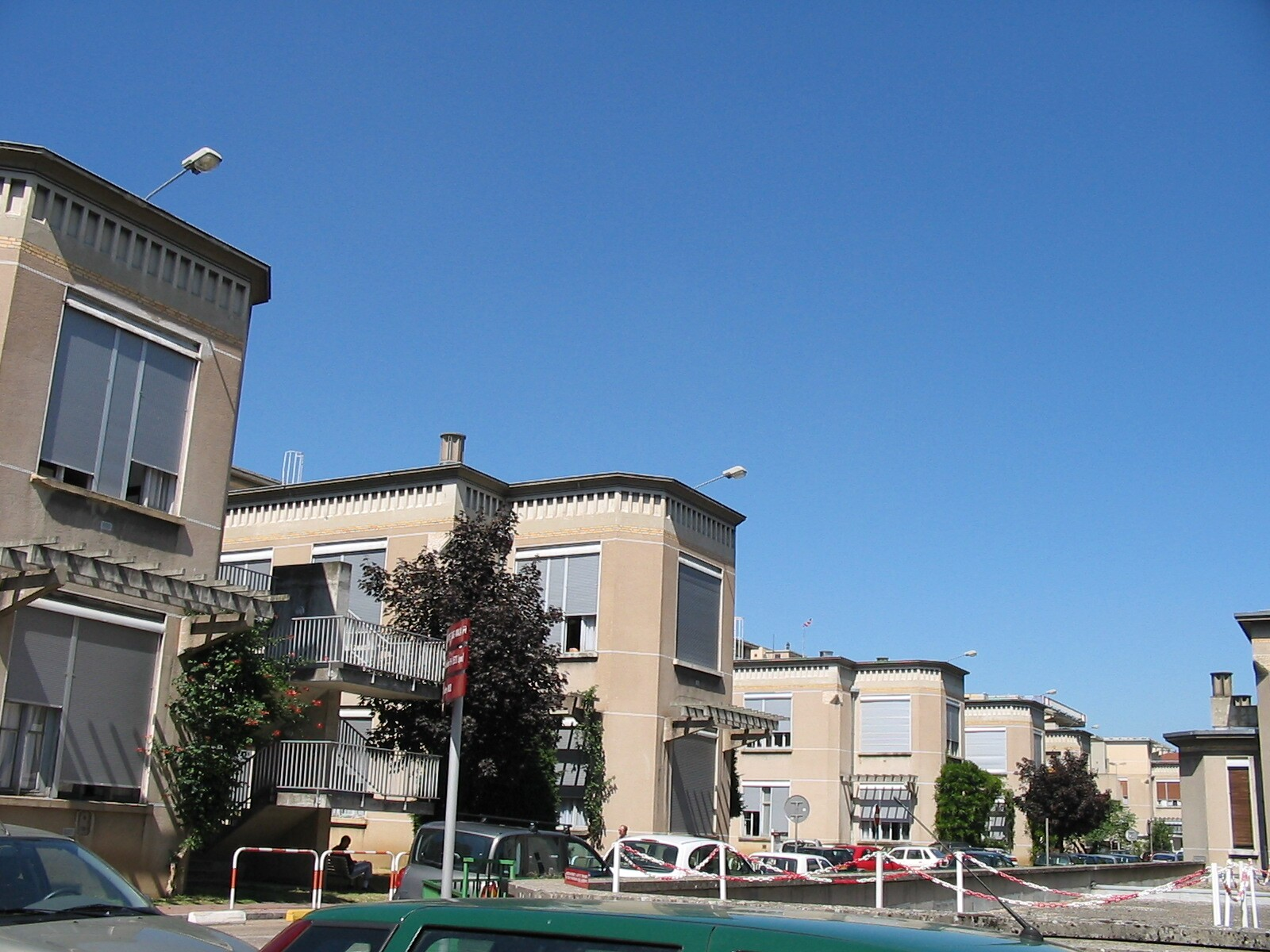
The pavilions of Hôpital Édouard-Herriot, connected by a network of underground galleries.

Europe, and France in particular, experienced a degree of inertia with a system that was over a century old. Thus, until the 1920s–1930s, new French hospitals remained more or less faithful to the pavilion layout, considered more in line with the "national spirit", but with pavilions increased by one or two additional stories. The abandonment of the pavilion system was very gradual, and significant examples continued to be built..

These were so-called transitional or hybrid hospitals, incorporating new construction standards and modern organization of care while retaining a pavilion structure. Among French examples from this period is the Nouvelle Pitié in Paris (Pitié-Salpêtrière Hospital, 1911), where pavilions were two stories high and grouped in sets of four in an H-shaped layout (organized according to type of care).

The Hôpital Édouard-Herriot in Lyon represents a culmination of the pavilion system, inaugurated in 1933 (construction having begun in 1911). It combines an already outdated pavilion layout with avant-garde architecture: 29 two-story pavilions built entirely in reinforced concrete, with large bay windows and flat roofs, connected by a network of underground galleries. The hospital is laid out as a garden city with trees, groves, and planted areas. Its design was partly inspired by a European study trip by a Lyon delegation, including visits to recent German and Danish hospitals such as the Rudolf Virchow Hospital in Berlin and the Rigshospitalet in Copenhagen.

== From asylums to CHS ==
The pavilion model could also be applied to specialized hospitals, such as lazarets, maternity hospitals, children's hospitals, facilities for the elderly, and seaside sanatoriums.

In France, the architecture of psychiatric asylums developed following the law of 30 June 1838, which required one psychiatric hospital per department. These asylums were built in rural areas, as agricultural work was initially considered therapeutic. This rural or suburban setting provided the space necessary for the pavilion model, which thus persisted into the early 21st century.

=== 19th and 20th centuries ===
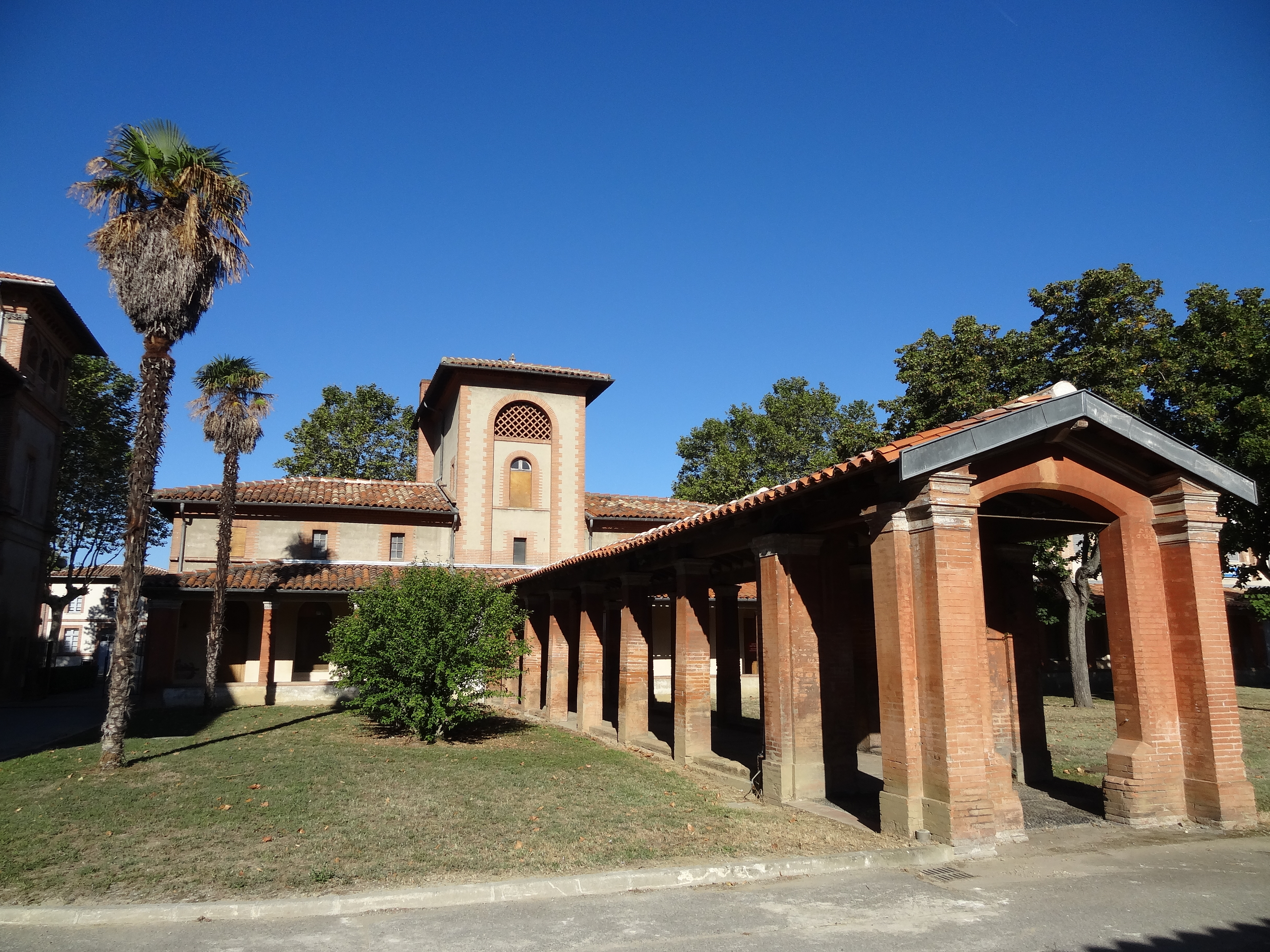
Braqueville asylum near Toulouse, with covered galleries connecting the pavilions.

Among the most notable pavilion asylums of the 19th century were:,

- the Braqueville asylum near Toulouse (now Centre hospitalier Gérard-Marchant), with buildings arranged in double rows (separating men and women) and connected by galleries;
- the Montdevergues asylum near Avignon (now Centre hospitalier Montfavet Avignon), arranged in a radioconcentric layout (buildings forming a multi-branch star);
- the Navarre asylum near Évreux, with pavilions arranged in rectangular formations;
- the Quatre-Mares asylum near Saint-Étienne-du-Rouvray, with two-story buildings arranged in an H-shaped layout;
- the Dury asylum near Amiens (now Centre hospitalier Philippe-Pinel), consisting of single-story pavilions all connected by covered galleries;
- the Château-Picon asylum near Bordeaux (now Centre hospitalier spécialisé Charles-Perrens), composed of twelve pavilions paired in twos and attached to a long central gallery (a "fishbone" layout).

During the first half of the 20th century, budget constraints limited the renewal of these psychiatric institutions. After the Second World War, an anti-psychiatry movement challenged the very concept of the psychiatric hospital, replacing it with the idea of the "village asylum". In most post-1950 developments, "modernity was still expressed through the enduring formula of separate pavilions, due to psychiatrists' rejection of the block hospital system."

=== Specialized Hospital Centers ===
At the beginning of the 21st century, Specialized Hospital Centers, known as CHS, are hospitals specialized in psychiatry and distributed throughout the entire French territory. They provide sector-based psychiatric care.

They are often located away from large cities (examples: the former site of the hospital of Saint Jean Bonnefonds near Saint Etienne, the asylum of Saint Avé in Morbihan, Sevrey, Novillars in Doubs) and have extensive grounds, with pavilions assigned to each sector.

A sector generally has one pavilion for acute pathologies and another for chronic ones. The organization is often village-like, with a cafeteria at the center, sometimes a hair salon, and an office providing certain services such as sending mail. CHS often have a public transport line allowing authorized patients to travel to the city or come for treatment, for example in a day hospital.

== Bibliography ==
- Laget, Pierre-Louis; Laroche, Claude (2012). The Hospital in France. Lyon: Lieux Dits. p. 592. ISBN 978-2-362190-54-4.
