= Shohola train wreck =

1864 railroad accident in Pennsylvania

Coordinates: 41.4750°N 74.9588°W

Great Shohola Train Wreck

Details
- Date: July 15, 1864; 162 years ago
- Location: Shohola Township, Pike County, Pennsylvania, USA
- Country: United States
- Operator: Erie Railroad
- Incident type: Head-on collision
- Cause: dispatcher error

Statistics
- Trains: 2
- Passengers: 958
- Deaths: 60–72

The Shohola train wreck occurred on July 15, 1864, during the American Civil War on the broad gauge Erie Railroad 1 1/2 miles (2.4 km) west of Shohola, Pennsylvania. A train carrying Confederate prisoners of war collided head-on with a coal train. Some 65 prisoners, guards, and train crew were killed.

== Background and lead-up ==
The prisoners were being taken from Point Lookout, Maryland, to newly constructed Camp Rathbun at Elmira, New York. They had begun their journey by steamer, traveling along the Atlantic coast from Maryland to New Jersey. Here they were switched to railroad for the final 273 miles (439 km) to Elmira. Some 833 Confederate prisoners of war (many captured at the Battle of Cold Harbor) were accompanied by 128 Union guards from the Veteran Reserve Corps.

The prisoners' train, consisting of 18 cars hauled by 30-ton wood-burning Engine 171 was designated as an 'extra', meaning it ran behind a scheduled train which displayed warning flags giving right of way to the following 'extra'. However Engine 171 had been delayed leaving Jersey City until 6 a.m. while guards located missing prisoners and was further delayed en route so that it arrived at Port Jervis, four hours late. The next 23 miles (37 km) of the railroad was, and is, a single track snaking along the Delaware River through hardwood forest, and has many "blind" curves. It passed through Sparrowbush, New York, and was travelling at a speed of 20 to 25 miles per hour (32 to 40 km/h) when it reached Shohola Township in Pennsylvania at 2.50 p.m. Ahead at Lackawaxen the dispatcher was responsible for stopping all eastbound traffic until the 'extra' had passed through. But it had been more than four hours since the scheduled train had passed through that morning and when a coal train from the Hawley branch, bound for Port Jervis, stopped at Lackawaxen Junction with 50 loaded coal cars the dispatcher mistakenly allowed it through. Soon afterwards he received the message that the 'extra' had passed Shohola; but it was too late.

== Collision ==
A mile and a half (2.4 km) from Shohola the track passes through "King and Fuller's Cut" which had only 50 feet (15 m) of forward visibility as the track negotiated a series of blind bends. The trains collided head-on with a crash so fierce that it was said that locals 'felt it as an earthquake'. The combined speed was more than 30 mph (48 km/h), and propelled the wood stacked in each engine's tenders forward into the cabs; killing both engineers and firemen. The wooden box cars were telescoped into each other. Of the 37 men in the car immediately behind the engine, 36 were killed outright, the only survivor being thrown clear. Most casualties occurred in the first three box cars, those riding further back escaped death though many were injured. A ring of uninjured guards was formed around the wreck but despite this five Confederate prisoners escaped and were never recaptured. Frank Evans, a Union guard described the scene: "The two locomotives were raised high in the air, face-to-face against each other, like giants grappling...The front (car) of our train was jammed into a space less than six feet. The two cars behind it were almost as badly wrecked. There were bodies impaled on iron rods and splintered beams. Headless trunks were mangled between the telescoped cars."

== Aftermath ==
The citizens of Shohola and nearby Barryville, New York, treated the wounded 'without regard to the colour of their uniforms' and doctors sent by two relief trains from Port Jervis worked throughout the night. The official death toll was 65 people killed composed of 44 prisoners, 17 guards, and 4 railway staff, however estimates range from between 60 and 72. A subsequent enquiry found the dispatcher, who fled the scene, to be negligent.

The dead were buried in unmarked graves next to the track, where they remained for 47 years until 1911 when they were moved to the Woodlawn National Cemetery at Elmira, and the Shohola Monument erected with the names of the Union soldiers on one side and the names of the Confederate soldiers on the other. The Shohola Railroad Historical Society houses a museum dedicated to the wreck in a caboose stationed permanently in Shohola.

== See also ==
- List of American railroad accidents
- List of disasters in the United States by death toll
- List of people who disappeared mysteriously (pre-1910)
- List of rail accidents (before 1880)
- Pennsylvania in the American Civil War
