= John W. Jones House =

Historic house in New York, United States

- U.S. National Register of Historic Places
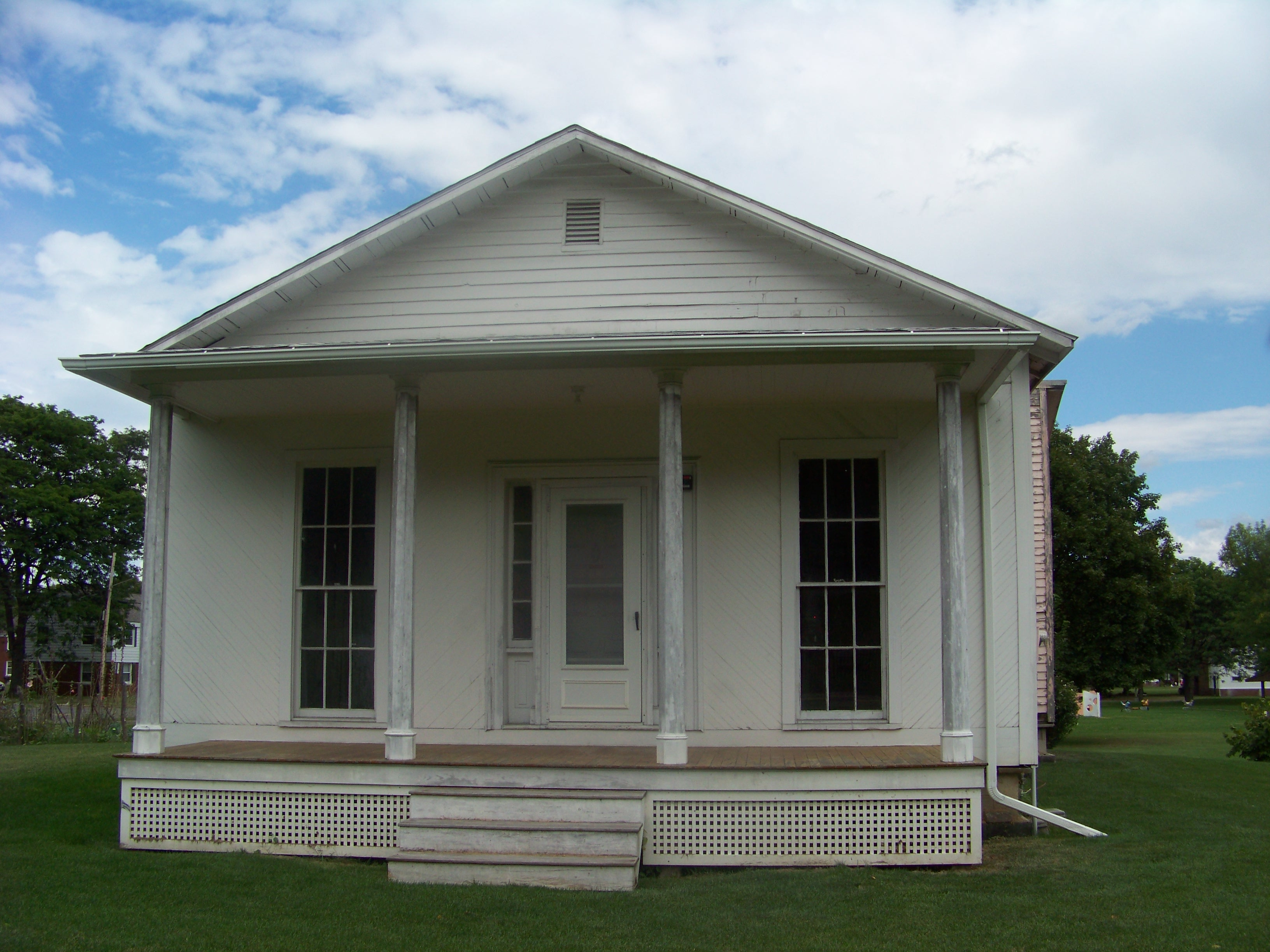

- Location within New York Location within the United States
- Location: Elmira, New York
- Coordinates: 42°6′27″N 76°49′26″W
- Built: 1868
- NRHP reference No.: 03001019
- Added to NRHP: October 10, 2003

The John W. Jones House currently stands at 1250 Davis Street, Elmira, New York, across from a historic entrance to Woodlawn Cemetery. It is the former home of John W. Jones and current home of the John W. Jones Museum. It stands on part of its original property, though it originally faced College Avenue. Historically, the house was the private residence of John W. Jones and his family, but changed ownership several times since, and was used as rental property that fell into disrepair. Condemned by the City of Elmira in 1997, Lucy Brown brought it to the public's attention and with a group of concerned citizens, saved it from demolition. It is now the home to the John W. Jones Museum.

== Museum ==
The museum emphasizes Elmira's role as the only regular agency and published station on the Underground Railroad between Philadelphia and St. Catharines, Canada, and explores Mr. Jones's community involvement and his relationship with his contemporaries. It also highlights the history of African Americans who settled in the Southern Tier of New York and the activity of local abolitionists.

== John W. Jones ==
John W. Jones came to Elmira as an escaped slave from Virginia in the 1840s. He was an active abolitionist and worked extensively with the Underground Railroad. He became sexton of Woodlawn Cemetery. During the American Civil War, he was responsible for burying the Confederate dead from the nearby Elmira prison camp in the section of the cemetery that eventually became Woodlawn National Cemetery. The John W. Jones House is built, at least in part, from portions of the camp sold at auction upon its disbandment. The house was added to the National Register of Historic Places in 2003.

== Gallery ==
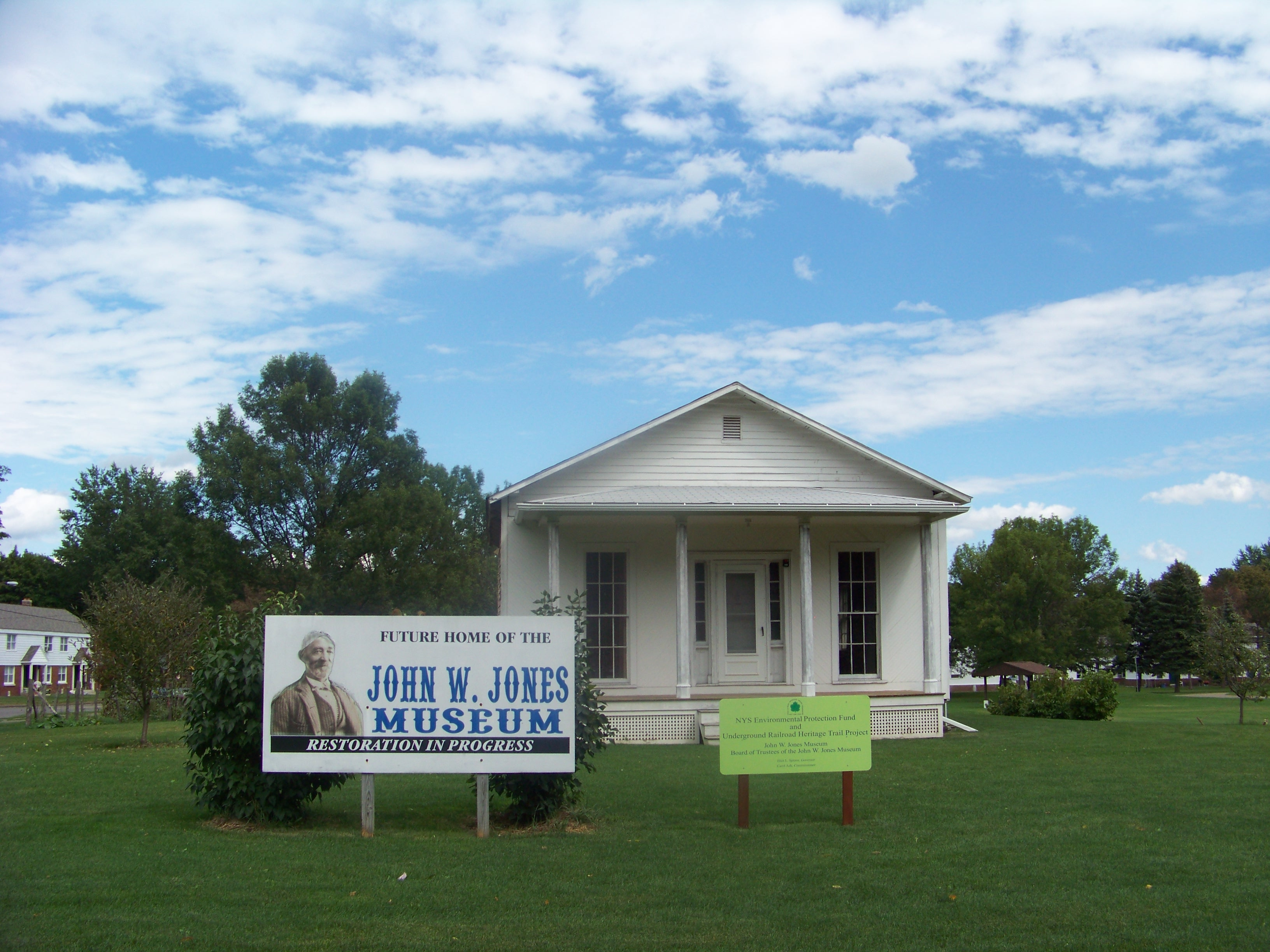
House with future plans signs

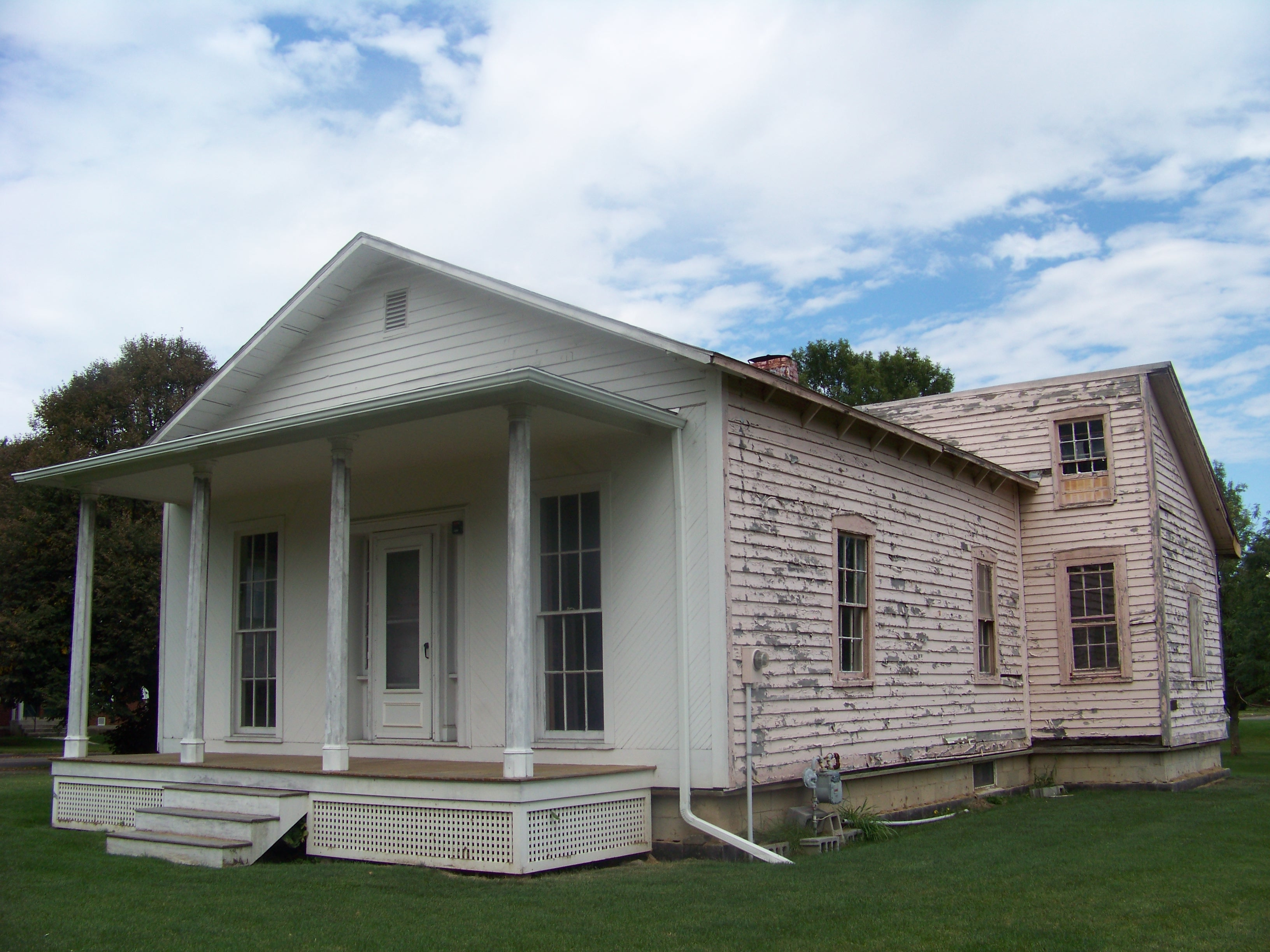
Front and right elevations

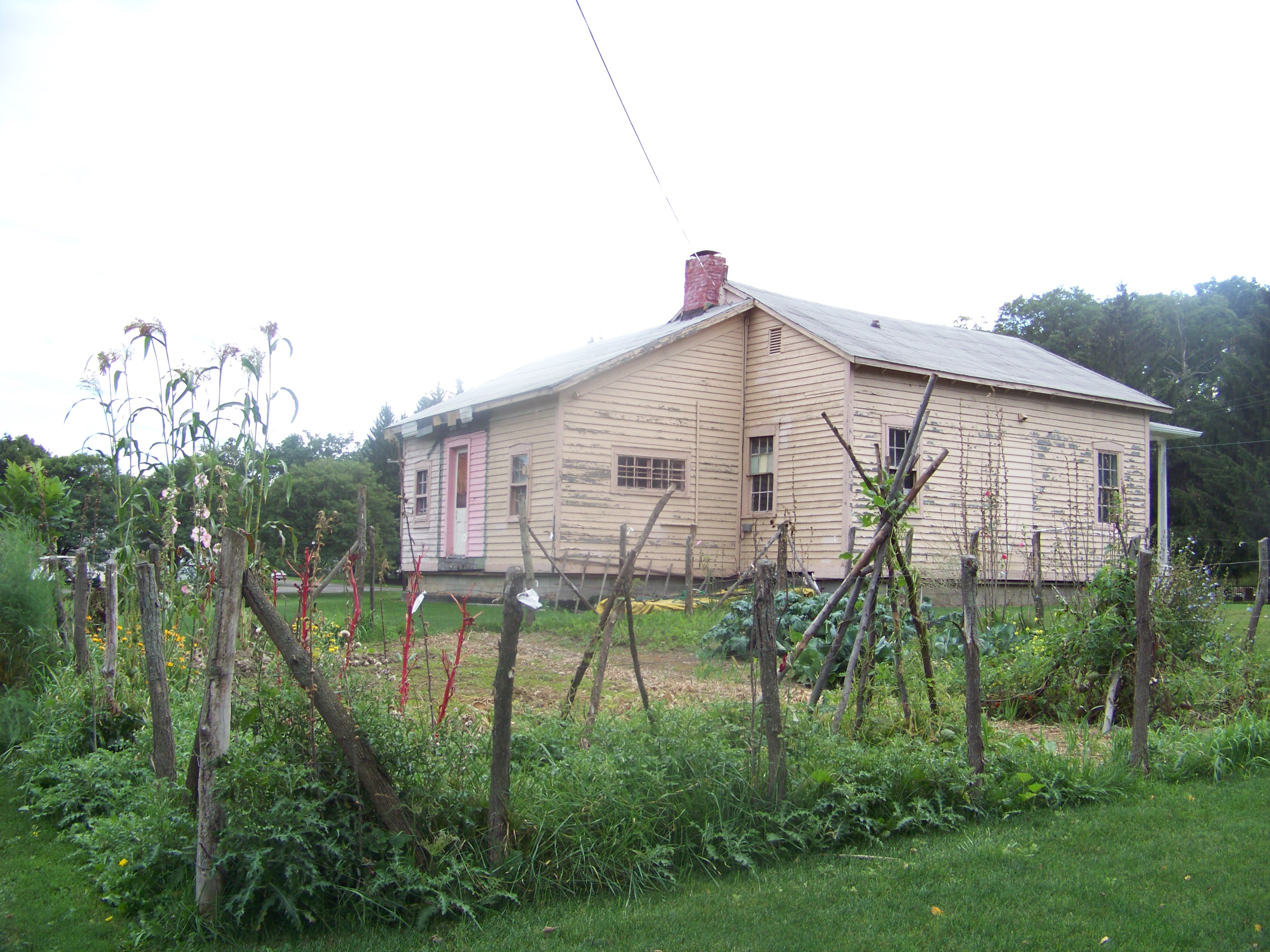
Rear and left elevations
