= Woodlawn National Cemetery =

Cemetery in Chemung County, New York, US

- U.S. National Register of Historic Places
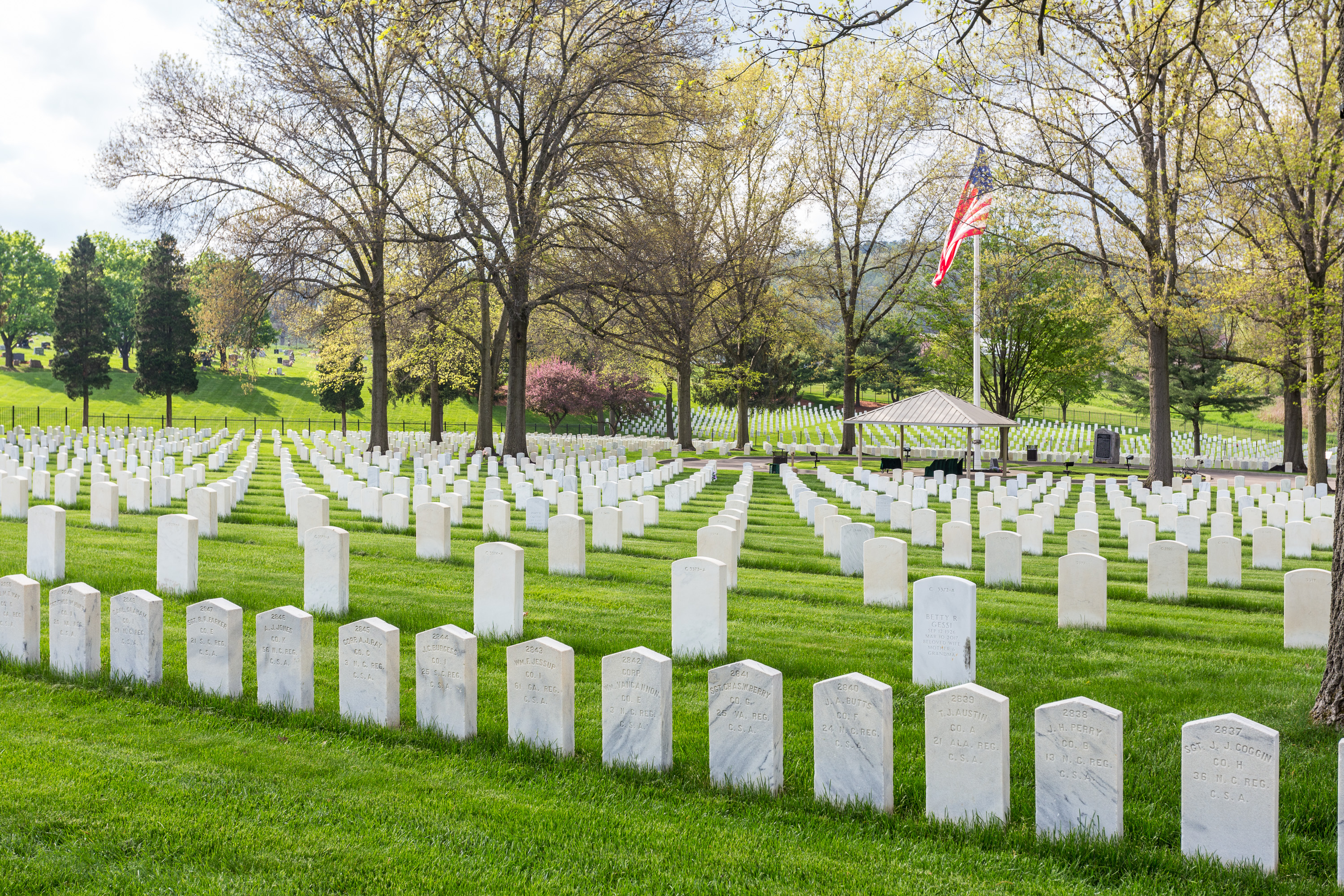

- Location within New York Location within the United States
- Location: Walnut and Davis Sts., West Hill and Bancroft Rds., Elmira, New York
- Coordinates: 42°06′39″N 76°49′42″W
- Built: 1864
- Architect: Pierce and Bickford; et al.
- NRHP reference No.: 04001117
- Added to NRHP: October 6, 2004

Woodlawn National Cemetery is a United States National Cemetery within Woodlawn Cemetery, which is in the city of Elmira, in Chemung County, New York. Administered by the United States Department of Veterans Affairs, it encompasses 10.5 acres (4.2 ha), and as of 2021, had over 11,000 interred remains.

== History ==
In 1861, Camp Rathbun, near the town of Elmira, was established as a training camp at the beginning of the Civil War. As the Union troops who trained there were sent to their respective assignments, the camp emptied and in 1864 it was turned into the Elmira Prison prisoner-of-war camp. The facilities were not adequate to house the thousands of Confederate prisoners, and many succumbed to exposure, malnutrition, and smallpox and were subsequently interred at the cemetery.

Woodlawn National Cemetery was listed on the National Register of Historic Places in 2004.

== Notable monuments ==
- The U.S. government erected the Shohola Monument in 1911 to commemorate a tragic railroad accident that took the lives of both Confederate and Union soldiers during the Civil War in 1864.
- In 1937, the United Daughters of the Confederacy erected a monument by sculptor Frederick Sievers in memory of those Confederate prisoners of war who died while imprisoned in Elmira.

== Gallery ==
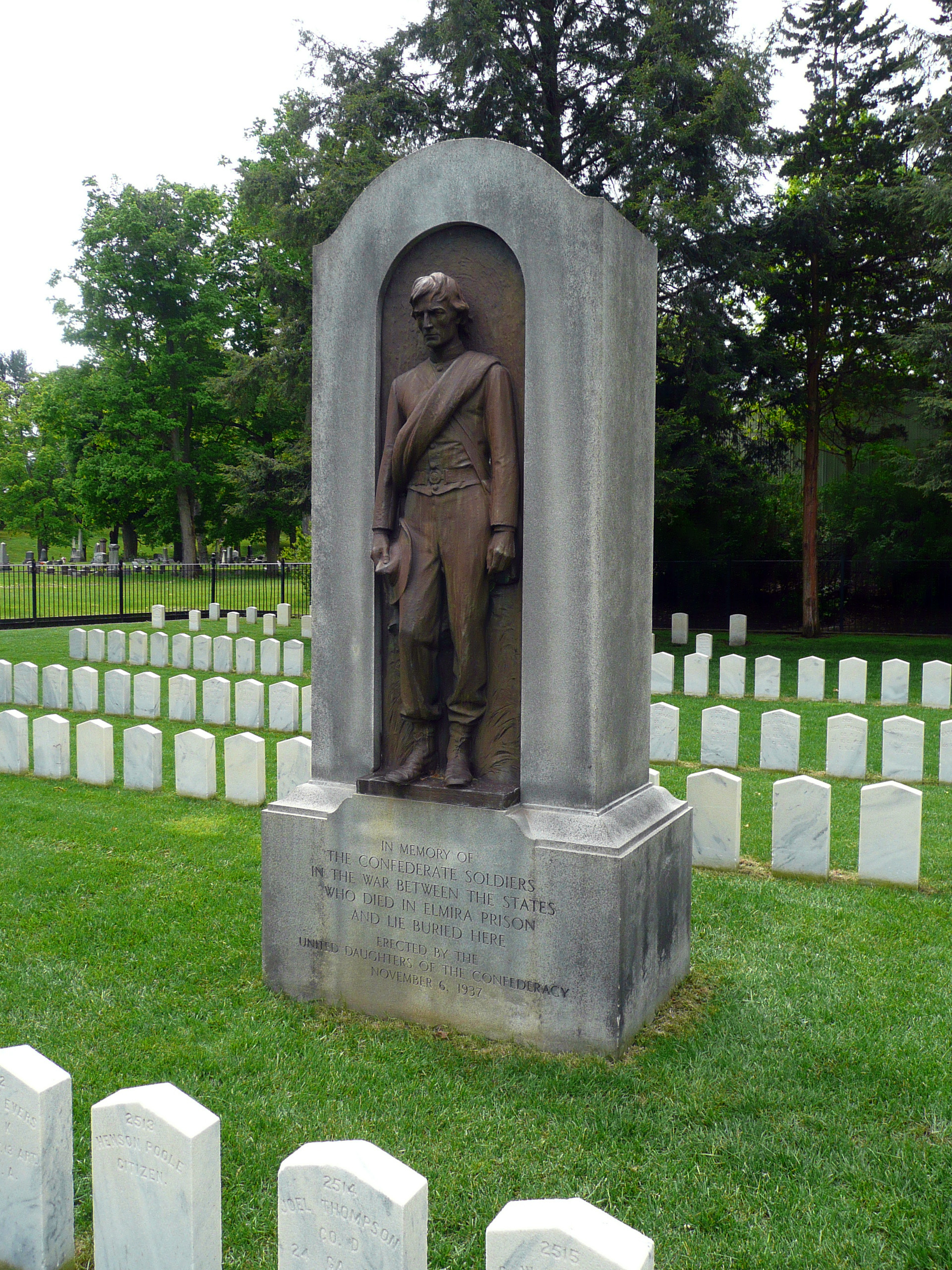
Confederate Monument.

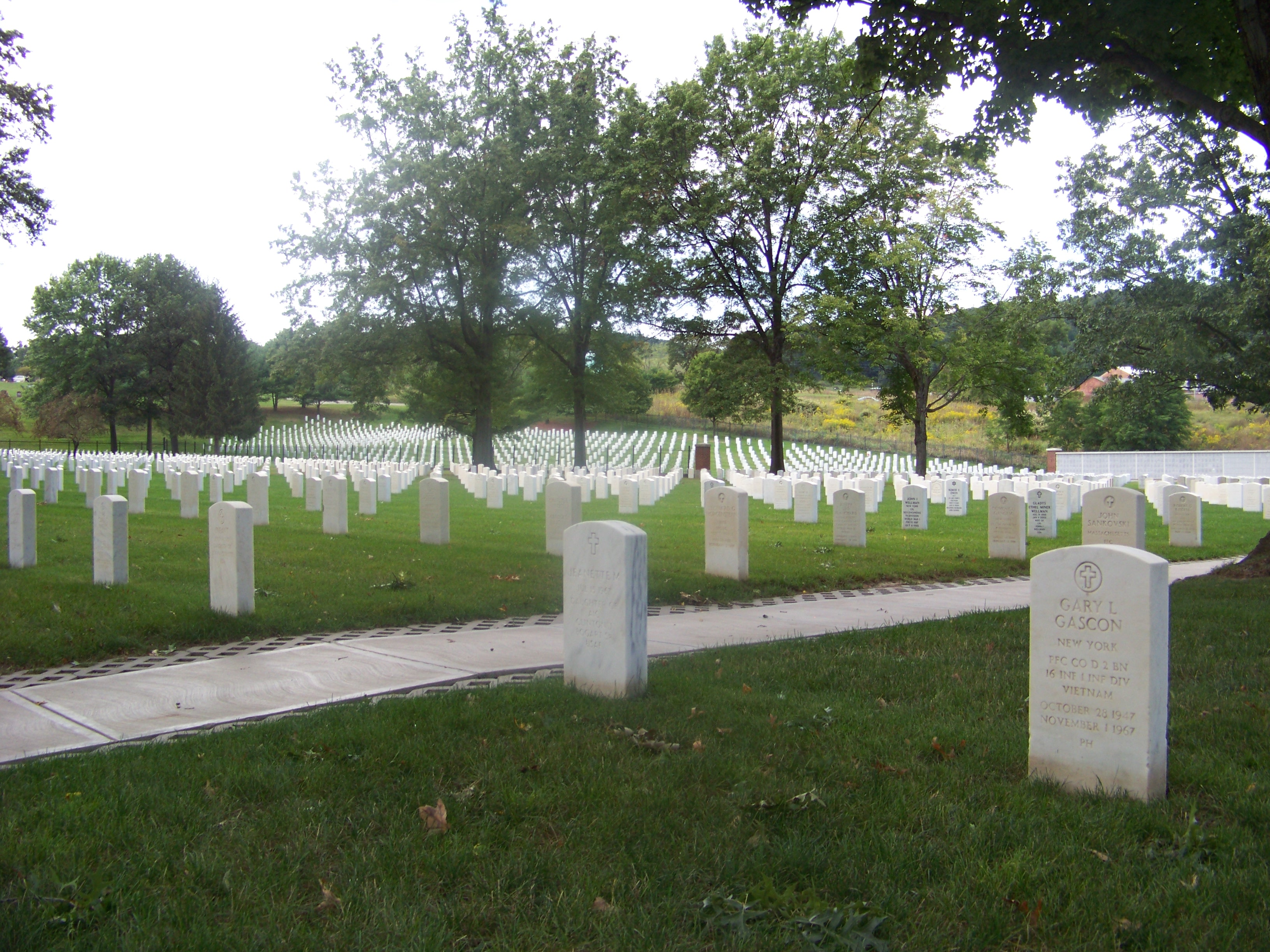
Woodlawn National Cemetery
