= Charles-François Viel =

French architect (1745–1819)

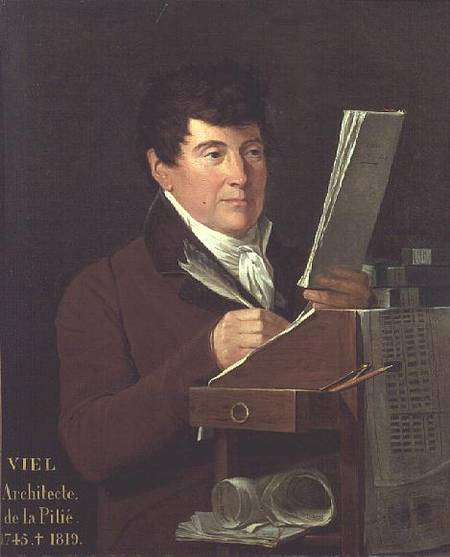
- Portrait by François Dumont, 1811
- Born: Charles François Viel; 21 January 1745; Paris, France
- Died: 1 December 1819 (aged 74); Former 12th arrondissement of Paris, Paris
- Occupation: Architect

Charles François Viel (also known as Charles François Viel de Saint-Maux; born 21 January 1745 in Paris and died 1 December 1819 in the same city) was a French architect and architectural theorist. He managed the construction and maintenance of the buildings for the General Hospital of Paris between 1780 and 1790.

== Biography ==
Viel studied at the Collège de Beauvais in Paris. He earned a Master of Arts degree from the university. He trained for two years as a painter under Gabriel Briard. In 1768, he became a student of the architect Jean-François Chalgrin. In 1773, he became inspector of works at the Collège de France.

His brother, Jean-Louis Viel de Saint-Maux, helped him in his career. Jean-Louis was also an architect, a painter, and a lawyer at the Parlement of Paris. Viel also received help from Abbé Jacques-Denis Cochin. He built the Cochin Hospital (the hospice Saint-Jacques-du-Haut-Pas) at the end of the Faubourg-Saint-Jacques.

In 1780, he became the architect of the General Hospital. He completed most of his work between 1780 and 1790. He had no official job during the French Revolution from 1790 until the Thermidorian Convention (1794 to 1795). The convention then started to invest money into hospitals again.

Viel never gained admission to the Institut de France, but he belonged to several learned societies, including the Académie des sciences, belles-lettres et arts de Rouen, the Athénée des arts, the Société philotechnique, and the Royal Academy of Turin (1813).

== Works ==
Viel supported tradition and classicism, but he was also an innovator. He used a new hospital design in his buildings. He focused on patient comfort, hygiene rules, and medical space. He wrote about his original technical ideas. The modern Assistance publique – Hôpitaux de Paris kept some of his buildings at the Salpêtrière and named a street after him.

- Renovation of the Hôtel-Dieu d'Étampes
- Grain hall (halle au blé) of Corbeil, on the Seine
- Mont-de-Piété building (55 Rue des Francs-Bourgeois)
- Cochin Hospital
- Pharmacie centrale des Hôpitaux at the Hôtel de Miramion
- Main building of the Hôpital de la Pitié (infirmerie de la Pitié)
- Amphitheater of the Hôtel-Dieu de Paris (renovation, 1791)
- Main sewer of Bicêtre Hospital (grand égout de Bicêtre)
- Laundry of the Pitié-Salpêtrière Hospital (buanderie, 1797–1802)
- Organ loft of Saint-Jacques (tribune de l'orgue, 1791)

== Publications ==
In his writings, Viel supported an idea of architecture based on experience and tradition.

- Des points d'appui indirects dans la construction des bâtiments (1801)
- Principes de l'ordonnance et de la construction des bâtimens (planned in 4 volumes, volumes I and IV were published)
  - Principes de l'ordonnance et de la construction des bâtimens; avec des recherches sur le nouveau pont de Paris, construit par Perronnet, et sur le temple élevé dans cette capitale selon les dessins de Soufflot (Vol. 1, 1812)
  - Principes de l'ordonnance et de la construction des bâtimens. Notices sur divers hôpitaux et autres édifices publics et particuliers, composés et construits (Vol. 4, 1812)
- De la chute imminente de la science de la construction des bâtimens en France, des causes directes et indirectes qui l'accélèrent (2 vols., 1818 to 1819)
- Des anciennes études de l'architecture. De la nécessité de les remettre en vigueur; et de leur utilité pour l'administration des bâtimens civils (1807)
- De l'impuissance des mathématiques pour assurer la solidité des bâtimens, et Recherches sur la construction des ponts (1805)
- De la construction des édifices publics sans l'emploi du fer, et quel en doit être l'usage dans les bâtimens particuliers (1803)
- Moyens pour la restauration des piliers du dôme du Panthéon (1797 to 1798)
- Dissertations sur les projets de coupoles de la Halle au blé de Paris, et des moyens de confortation des murs extérieurs contre la poussée de la voûte annulaire de cet édifice, précédées des Principes généraux et particuliers sur la construction des voûtes, des péristyles, des frontons et des supports des dômes (1809)
- Grand égout de Bicêtre, ordonné par le roi Louis XVI, plans, élévations, coupes et profils gravés du monument (1817)

== Sources ==
- Lenoir, Alexandre (1820). "Nécrologie" [Obituary]. Annales françaises des arts, des sciences et des lettres (in French).
- Gabet, Charles (1831). "VIEL (Charles-François)". Dictionnaire des artistes de l'école française au XIXe siècle [Dictionary of Artists of the French School in the 19th Century] (in French). Paris: Mme Vergne. p. 688.
- Lauro, Marc (2019). Charles-François Viel (1745-1819) : architecte et théoricien (PDF) (PhD thesis) (in French). Université Paris 1 Panthéon-Sorbonne.
- Lauro, Marc (2017). "Charles-François Viel, architecte des hôpitaux parisiens et théoricien à la fin du XVIIIe siècle" [Charles-François Viel, Architect of Parisian Hospitals and Theorist at the End of the 18th Century]. In Situ (in French) (31). doi:10.4000/insitu.13923.
