= National Register of Historic Places listings in Jenkins County, Georgia =

This is a list of properties and districts in Jenkins County, Georgia that are listed on the National Register of Historic Places (NRHP).

This National Park Service list is complete through NPS recent listings posted March 21, 2025.

`

== Current listings ==
	Name on the Register	Image	Date listed	Location	City or town	Description
1	Birdsville Plantation	Birdsville Plantation	April 7, 1971 (#71000280)	NW of Millen; 32°52′17″N 82°04′42″W	Millen	The NRHP form gives 32°52′43″N 82°05′00″W as a corner of the 50-acre property. The main house is at 32.87288°N 82.07837°W.
2	Camp Lawton	Camp Lawton	March 24, 1978 (#78000992)	Address Restricted (in Magnolia Springs State Park) at 32.8735°N 81.9585°W	Millen	Some remnants of the earthen fort and artifacts remain.
3	Carswell Grove Baptist Church and Cemetery	Carswell Grove Baptist Church and Cemetery	January 22, 1996 (#95001564)	Big Buckhead Rd. off US 25/GA 21; 32°54′08″N 82°01′25″W	Perkins	Church was destroyed by arson in 2014.
4	Downtown Millen Historic District	Downtown Millen Historic District	November 15, 1996 (#96001340)	Along Cotton Ave. roughly bounded by N. Hendrix St., E. Winthrope Ave., N. Masonic St., and the RR line 32°48′08″N 81°56′24″W	Millen	
5	Jenkins County Courthouse	Jenkins County Courthouse	September 18, 1980 (#80001100)	Courthouse Sq. 32°48′15″N 81°56′21″W	Millen	Originally built in 1908, burned in 1910. Rebuilt (essentially the same) by 1912. Also part of the Downtown Millen Historic District
6	Millen High School	Millen High School	November 21, 2002 (#02000842)	100 Cleveland Ave. 32°48′19″N 81°56′33″W	Millen	It has been demolished.
