= Courtney Smith =

Courtney Smith may refer to:

- Courtney Smith (rugby union) (born 1971), Canadian rugby player
- Courtney Smith (defensive back) (born 1984), American football cornerback
- Courtney Smith (linebacker) (born 1984), Canadian football linebacker
- Courtney Smith (wide receiver) (born 1987), American football wide receiver
- Courtney Smith (curler) (born 1999), New Zealand curler
- C. J. Smith (soccer) (born J1998), Canadian soccer player
- Courtney Thorne-Smith (born 1967), American actress
- Courtney Smith Pope, owner of Cheer Extreme Allstars
- Courtne Smith (born 1988), Canadian-American entrepreneur
