= Carswell Grove Baptist Church and Cemetery =

Historic site in Jenkins County, Georgia, US

- U.S. National Register of Historic Places
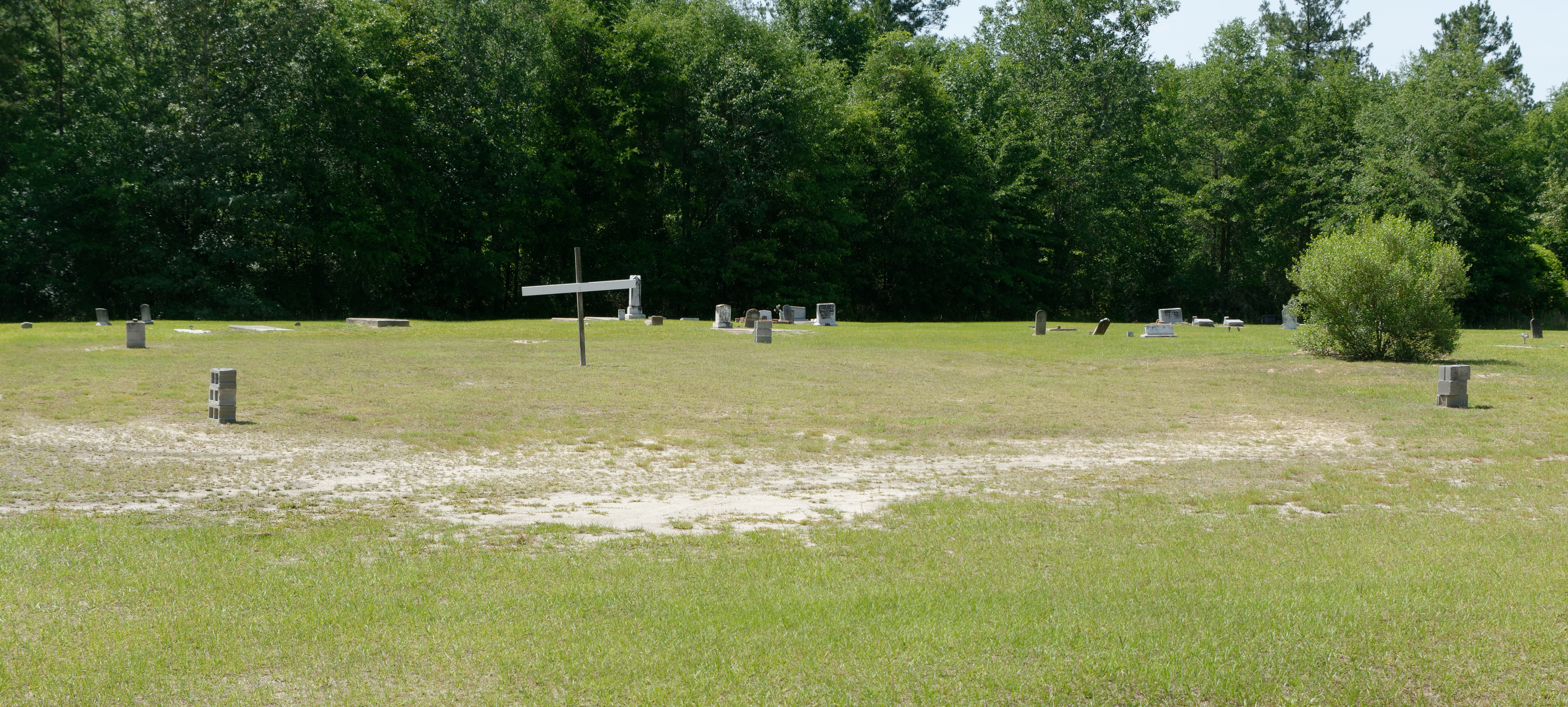
- Cemetery and the site of the original church

- Location within Georgia Location within the United States
- Location: (3.4 miles west from US 25/GA 21): 1842-1846 Big Buckhead Road, Perkins, Georgia; Zip Code 30442
- Coordinates: 32°54′08″N 82°1′25″W
- Area: 3 acres (1.2 ha)
- Built: c.1870 (cemetery); 1919 (church)
- Architectural style: Late Gothic Revival
- NRHP reference No.: 95001564
- Added to NRHP: January 22, 1996

Carswell Grove Baptist Church and Cemetery (1842–1846 Big Buckhead Church Road, near the hamlet of Perkins, about 7 miles north of the city of Millen, in Jenkins County, Georgia) is a historic Black church and cemetery which are listed on the National Register of Historic Places in 1996. The church, a replacement for an earlier church burned in 1919, was destroyed by arson in 2014.

A different historic church, the Big Buckhead Baptist Church, is located a few hundred yards southwest. Prior to the Civil War blacks had worshipped there in segregated pews; "the negroes, whether free or slave, were quiet spectators" because they were considered members of the church with the same status as converted heathens in foreign lands. Yet all received the same communion, and all were baptized in the same water without distinction. After the war and the emancipation of the slaves, there was an impetus by both white and colored congregants to develop separate congregations. White judge Porter W. Carswell gave blacks 2 acres (0.81 ha) nearby to build their own church; they named it in his honor. Over the next five decades, the church became the spiritual heart of the local black community.

The original church was the first of seven black churches burned in the Jenkins County, Georgia, riot of 1919. It was replaced in 1919 by a wood-frame clapboarded building with Gothic Revival windows and other details. Its front gable end was flanked by two square towers. Before its destruction in 2014, the building was boarded up and had deteriorated; the congregation meets in a more modest and modern adjacent building built in 2008.

The cemetery was founded around 1870, when the original church building was built. It is located along the rear and sides of the church, and includes "modest" headstones.
