= Bo Ginn =

American politician

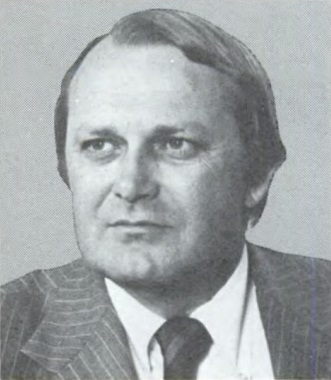

Member of the U.S. House of Representatives from Georgia's 1st district
- In office January 3, 1973 – January 3, 1983
- Preceded by: George E. Hagan
- Succeeded by: Lindsay Thomas

Personal details
- Born: Ronald Bryan Ginn; May 31, 1934 Morgan, Georgia, U.S.
- Died: January 6, 2005 (aged 70) Augusta, Georgia, U.S.
- Party: Democratic
- Spouse: Gloria Ginn
- Education: Georgia Southern College

Ronald Bryan "Bo" Ginn, (May 31, 1934 – January 6, 2005) was an American politician who represented Georgia's 1st congressional district in the United States House of Representatives from 1973 to 1983.

Ginn was born in Morgan, Georgia and attended Abraham Baldwin Agricultural College in Tifton, Georgia from 1951 through 1953 and Georgia Southern College in Statesboro where he earned a degree in 1956. He was considered a champion baseball player as a youth, but was stricken by crippling polio as a teenager and was told he would never walk again. Surgery, long months of therapy at the Warm Springs Foundation, and a strong determination allowed him to leave his wheelchair. This experience and the encouragement from others ultimately led him to a career in public service. Ginn served as administrative assistant to U.S. Senator Herman Talmadge and U.S. Congressman George Elliott Hagan. He successfully ran against Hagan as a Democrat to win the 1st District congressional seat in 1972 to the 93rd United States Congress. He served five consecutive terms in that seat before stepping down to run for Governor of Georgia in 1982.

== Political career ==
Ginn went to Washington in 1961 as chief aide to U.S. Rep. G. Elliott Hagan, and then served as the chief aide to U.S. Senator Herman E. Talmadge. In 1971, Ginn returned to Georgia to resume a career in business and to explore the prospect of running for Congress. He was elected in 1972, and served five consecutive terms representing the First District, encompassing 20 counties in the southeast section of the state, including all of the Georgia coast.

At the time of his retirement from Congress, Ginn had become a senior member of the House Committee on Appropriations, and was chairman of the powerful Military Construction Subcommittee with authority for U.S. military ba se construction world- wide. He had sought the Appropriations Committee assignment after fighting off the near-closure of Fort Stewart and Hunter Army Airfield in the early 1970s, and used his committee position to preside over a massive construction program for the Stewart- Hunter facilities that would later become the home base of the 3rd Infantry Division. Ginn is also credited with facilitating the construction of the Kings Bay Naval Submarine Base in Camden County, and led Congressional efforts to bring the Federal Law Enforcement Training Center (FLETC) to Glynn County, which is now the county's largest employer. In addition, he was a staunch advocate for MARTA in Atlanta, and an ardent supporter of national interests that brought jobs and economic development to Georgia such as Lockheed's C-5 A aircraft program. Ginn also was an early leader in environmental preservation issues in Georgia. He was the prime author of legislation that led to a protected wilderness designation for the Okefenokee National Wildlife Refuge, the Blackbeard Island and Wolf Island National Wildlife Refuges, and large portions of Cumberland Island National Seashore.

He decided to leave Congress in 1982 to run for governor to succeed George Busbee, who was stepping down after eight years in office. The Democratic runoff election was a classic confrontation between Joe Frank Harris, who ran as a conservative promising no tax increases under any circumstances, and Ginn, who wanted to pursue a more progressive agenda for the state's future.

In the 1982 Georgia gubernatorial election, Ginn lost in the primary to Harris, who went on to win the general and serve two terms in office. His political career over, he founded the Ginn & Eddington lobbying firm in Washington, D.C. and later moved to Augusta, Georgia to be closer to his children.

== Georgia Southern University ==
Ginn was a firm supporter of increased educational funding and Georgia Southern University. Ginn helped secure the title of "University" for the college and raised millions of dollars in donations to build the college's first football stadium while Erk Russell was head coach of the GSU Eagles national championship team. Ginn also taught as an adjunct professor for the University in political science.

== Magnolia Springs State Park ==
In 1988, the Millen National Fish Hatchery at Magnolia Springs State Park was named in honor of Ginn. The state park was a project of the Civilian Conservation Corps opened in 1939 in Jenkins County, midway between Augusta and Savannah and had been the location of Camp Lawton, a prisoner of war center during the Civil War. The Fish and Wildlife Service opened the hatchery in 1950 and operated it until 1996 when it was unable to continue funding the center and transferred control to the Georgia Department of Natural Resources. The state of Georgia operated the hatchery and adjacent aquarium until 2009 when the Jenkins County Development Authority assumed operation of the hatchery for one year, but was unable to fund the aquarium.

Ginn's wife Gloria died in 1998; Ginn was diagnosed with lung cancer in 2003 and succumbed to the disease on January 6, 2005. He was survived by three children, and seven grandchildren.

U.S. House of Representatives
Preceded by George Elliott Hagan	Member of the U.S. House of Representatives from Georgia's 1st congressional district January 3, 1973 – January 3, 1983	Succeeded by Robert Lindsay Thomas
