= Birdsville (disambiguation) =

Birdsville is a town in Australia.

Birdsville or Birdville may also refer to:

- Birdsville, Georgia
- Birdsville, Maryland
- Birdville, Texas
