= Jenkins County School District =

School district in Georgia (U.S. state)

Address
- 1152 East Winthrope Avenue Millen, Georgia, 30442-6752; United States
- Coordinates: 32.803582°N 81.935464°W

District information
- Grades: Pre-school - 12
- Superintendent: Tara Cooper
- Accreditation(s): Southern Association of Colleges and Schools; Georgia Accrediting Commission

Students and staff
- Enrollment: 1,754
- Faculty: 119

Other information
- Telephone: (478) 982-6000
- Fax: (478) 982-6002
- Website: www.jchs.com

The Jenkins County School District is a public school district in Jenkins County, Georgia, United States, based in Millen. It serves the communities of Millen and Perkins.

== Schools ==
The Jenkins County School District has one elementary school, one middle school, and one high school.

=== Elementary school ===
- Jenkins County Elementary School

=== Middle school ===
- Jenkins County Middle School

=== High school ===
- Jenkins County High School
