= Millen High School =

Historic school in the US

- U.S. National Register of Historic Places
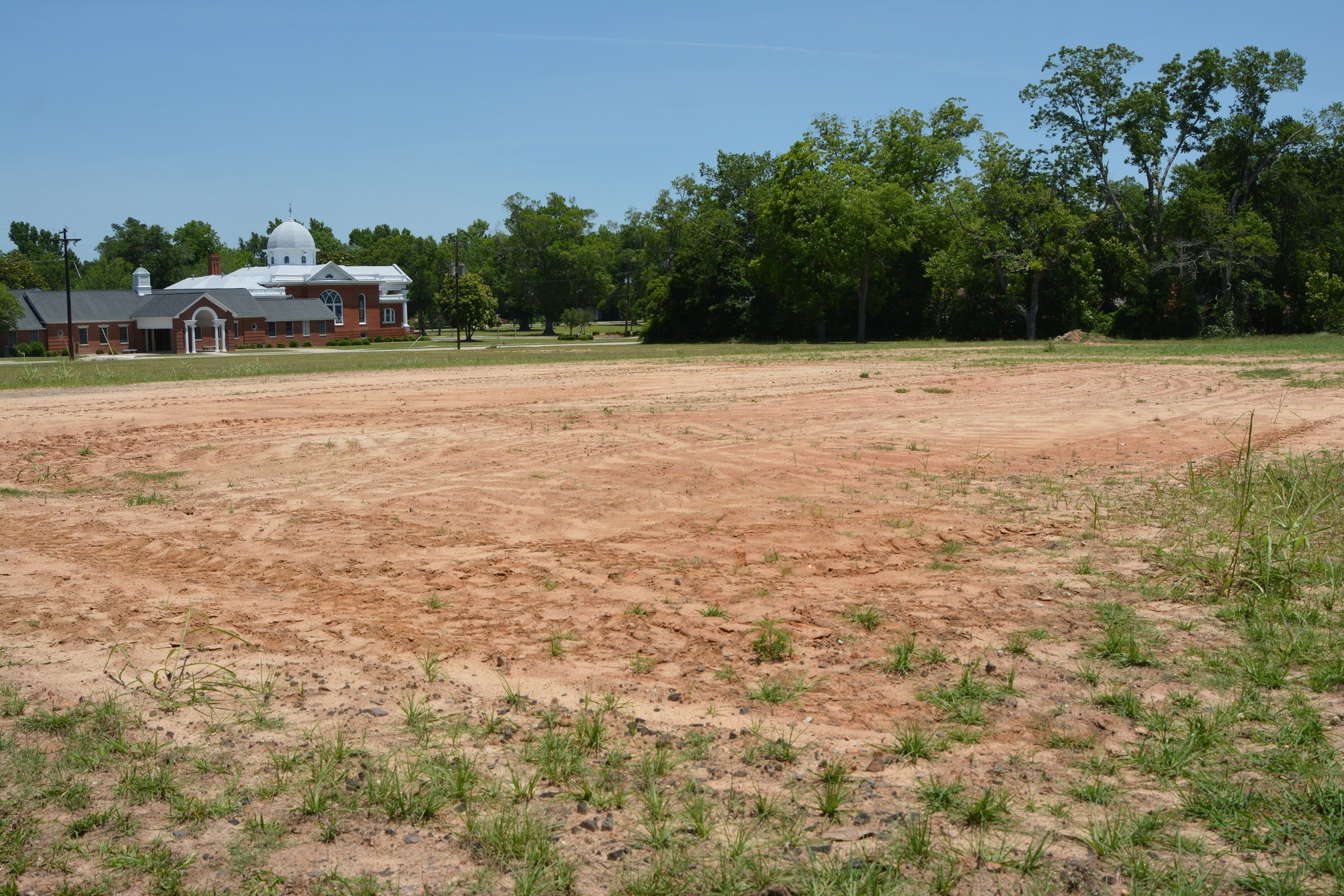
- Site of the old high school

- Location within Georgia Location within the United States
- Location: 100 Cleveland Ave., Millen, Georgia
- Coordinates: 32°48′19″N 81°56′33″W
- Area: 3.2 acres (1.3 ha)
- Built: 1922
- Built by: Arnold Construction Co.
- Architect: Scroggs and Ewing (1922 building)
- Architectural style: Classical Revival
- NRHP reference No.: 02000842
- Added to NRHP: November 21, 2002

Millen High School is a high school in Millen, Georgia. It was listed on the National Register of Historic Places in 2002. The listing included two contributing buildings and one non-contributing building.

The present high school serving the area is the Jenkins County High School, in Millen.

The main building was built in 1922, and was designed by Augusta architects Scroggs & Ewing. It is a two-story T-shaped wood-frame building with a brick veneer. It has Classical Revival elements.

A second, one-story L-shaped building was built during 1941–1943. It was started as a Works Progress Administration-funded project, and it served as an elementary school.

A lunchroom building was built in 1962 in between the other two buildings, and linked by covered walkways.

All three buildings in the historic school building complex have been demolished.

Debris from the demolition of the Old Primary School was burned in April 2011.
