= Birdsville Plantation =

Historic house in Georgia, United States

- U.S. National Register of Historic Places
- U.S. Historic district
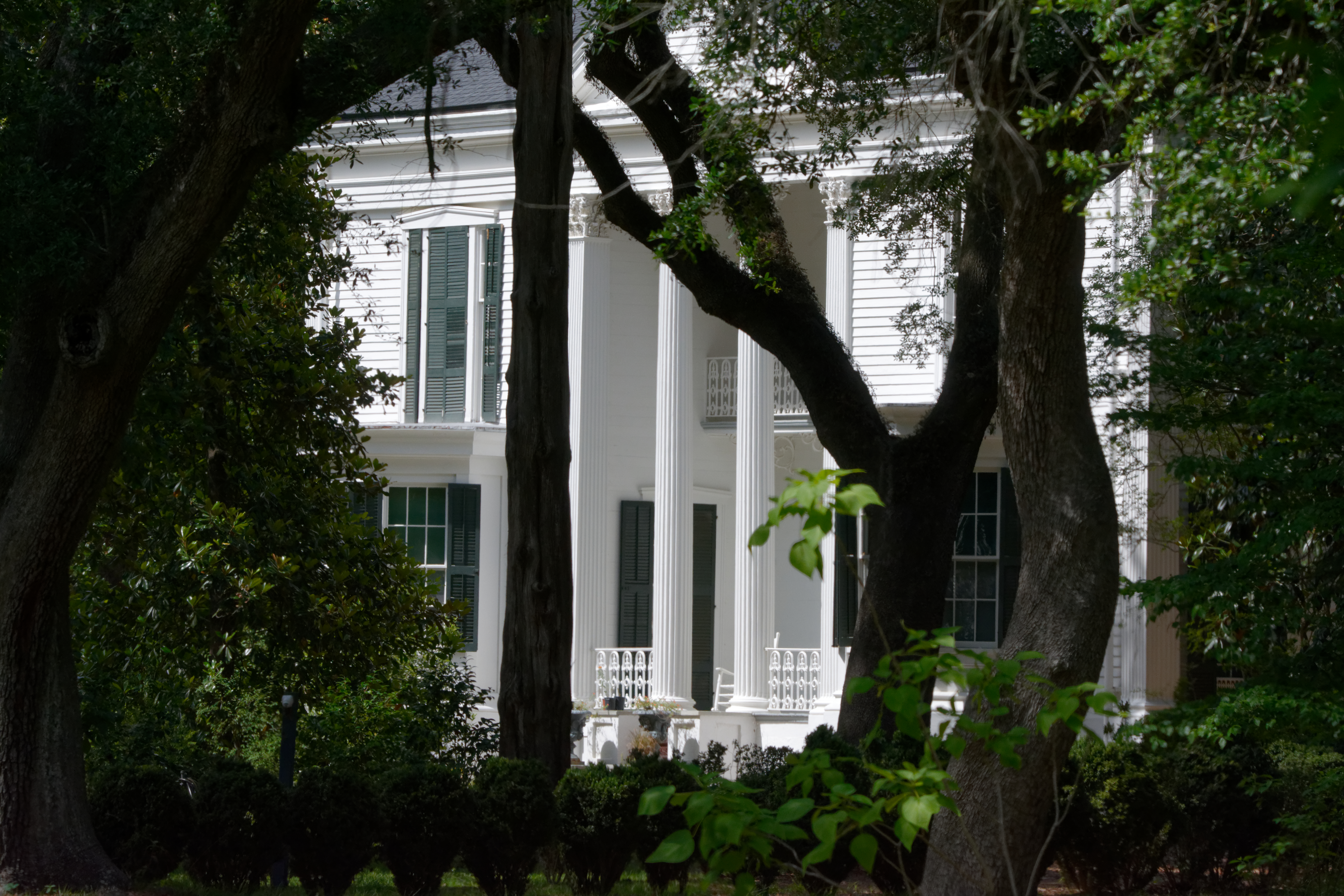
- The main house

- Location within Georgia Location within the United States
- Location: NW of Millen, Georgia
- Coordinates: 32.87288°N 82.0783782°W
- Area: 50 acres (20 ha)
- NRHP reference No.: 71000280
- Added to NRHP: April 7, 1971

Birdsville Plantation, in Birdsville, Jenkins County, Georgia, is a 50 acres (20 ha) property which was listed on the National Register of Historic Places in 1971. It then included 10 contributing buildings. It is a National Bicentennial Farm.

The plantation property includes a main house, a barn, a privy, a smoke house, an old kitchen, a well house, a log building, an apothecary, a store, and a house and office of Mr. Bird, as well as a pecan grove and historic oak trees. A cotton gin building is included in photographs of the property. (Note: The original Birdsville National Register form, dated February 16, 1971, which justified the historic nature of the property, appears not available online at the National Park Service, as of April 21, 2017; an amendment updating the nomination to clarify that the acreage covered is 50 acres, dated November 6, 1973, is available.)

The plantation house survived Sherman's March to the Sea, with reason attributed to Sherman sparing the house due to the death of twins. A version of the story shared online is that Union troops "found freshly dug graves, and began to unearth them looking for hidden silver, valuables, etc. They stopped when they discovered they were actual graves. The lady of the house had recently given birth to twins who had not survived, these were the plundered graves. The plantation was spared complete destruction out of respect."

It dates from circa 1789 and is one of few colonial-era ones in the interior of Georgia. Its front appearance was created in modifications c. 1847, under Henry Philip Jones, son of the original owner.

The modifications added Greek Revival and Italianate elements in an unusual design. It is a two-story house with an unusual inset front portico, with four columns having Corinthian capitals. Its front facade, which would be flat otherwise, is relieved by two projecting Italianate window bays. It has at least three brick chimneys. Pilasters with Corinthian capitals frame the north side of the house. (Note: These details are visible in photos.)

Birdsville's architecture is unusual among plantations in the area. Birdsville was located in Burke County until Jenkins County was carved out in 1905.
