= Magnolia Springs State Park =

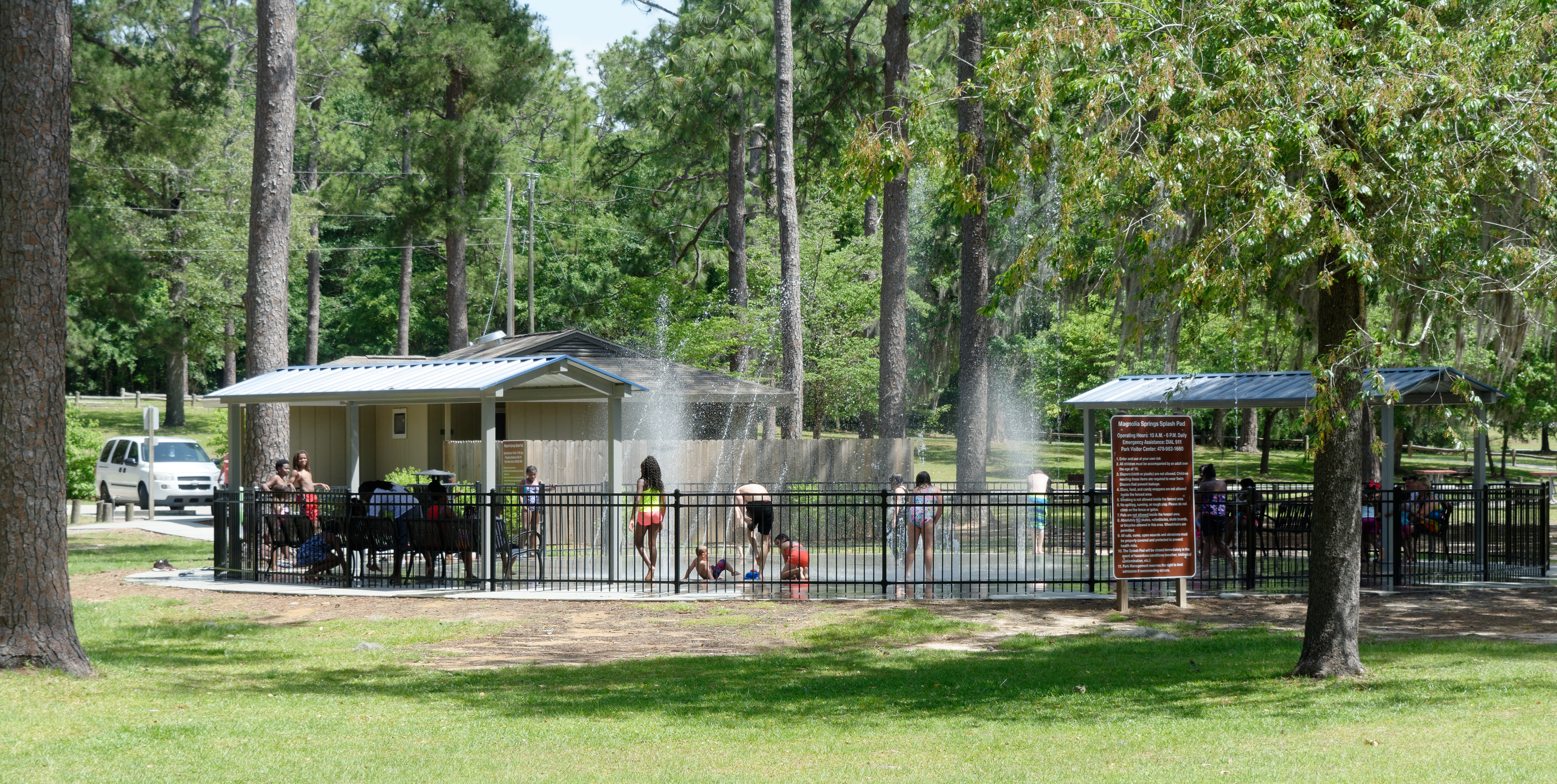
- The splash pad
- Interactive map of Magnolia Springs State Park
- Type: Public
- Location: Jenkins County, Georgia
- Area: 1,071 acres (4.33 km^{2})
- Created: 1939
- Operator: Georgia Department of Natural Resources
- Status: Open
- Website: Magnolia Springs

Magnolia Springs State Park
- Location in Georgia
- Coordinates: 32°53′12″N 81°57′20″W
- Elevation: 54 m (177 ft)

Magnolia Springs State Park is a 1,070-acre (430 ha) Georgia state park located between Perkins and Millen in Jenkins County. The park was built as a project of the Civilian Conservation Corps and opened in 1939. The park is well known for its crystal clear springs that are estimated to flow 7 million US gallons (26,000 m^{3}) per day. The park also offers unique wildlife near the springs, including alligators, turtles, and a variety of birds and fish.

During the American Civil War, the area that now comprises the day-use area of the park was used as a prison, Camp Lawton, which is on the National Register of Historic Places. The park still houses remnants of the earthen fort that guarded the 10,000-prisoner camp. Two huge timbers, possibly from the prison but more likely from work done by the Civilian Conservation Corps between 1938 and 1942, were recovered from the spring run.

The park has 26 tent/RV campsites, eight fully furnished cottages with central HVAC and satellite TV a, a 16-person Group Lodge with satellite TV and screened back porch, and a new History Center that currently displays some of the first artifacts excavated by the archaeology team from Georgia Southern University. Georgia Southern's Sociology/Anthropology Department has been conducting surveys and excavations for a number of years at the park, serving as a partner in revealing and interpreting the history of Camp Lawton. In the summer of 2015, the park is opening a splash pad to ultimately take the place of the aging and underused swimming pool.

The nearby Bo Ginn Aquarium and Fish Hatchery has been closed since 2010 after a short period of operation by the Jenkins County Development Authority, but it had also been closed twice before by the United States Fish and Wildlife Service (1997) and the Georgia Department of Natural Resources (2007).

== History ==
Camp Lawton was established during the Civil War in the fall of 1864 by the Confederate Army to confine Union prisoners of war. The Magnolia Springs site was selected to take advantage of the abundant water supply. Built by slave labor and a group of Union prisoners of pine timber harvested on site, the walls measured 12 to 15 feet (4.6 m) high. The stockade began receiving the first of at least 10,299 prisoners in early October. The post was abandoned by the end of November when threatened by Sherman's drive on Savannah.

Research using ground-penetrating radar conducted in December 2009 by the LAMAR Institute, Savannah, Georgia () revealed a possible location for the southwest corner of the prison stockade. In 2010 Georgia Southern University undertook archaeological investigations to "ground truth" the results of the radar survey. In August of that year several Georgia Southern archaeology students uncovered the stockade and around 200 Civil War artifacts. The students had used watercolors by an imprisoned private to locate the site.

== Facilities ==
- 23 tent/trailer/RV Campsites
- 8 cottages
- 3 walk-in tent campsites
- 3 playgrounds
- Splash pad
- 8 picnic shelters
- 1 Group Lodge
- 1 group shelter
- 1 pioneer campground
- Magnolia Springs History Center - interprets history of park including Camp Lawton and the work of the Civilian Conservation Corps.

== Annual events ==
- Heritage Day - event focusing on history of the park and Jenkins County (November)

== See also ==
- Camp Lawton (Georgia)
