= Lindsay Thomas (politician) =

American politician (born 1943)

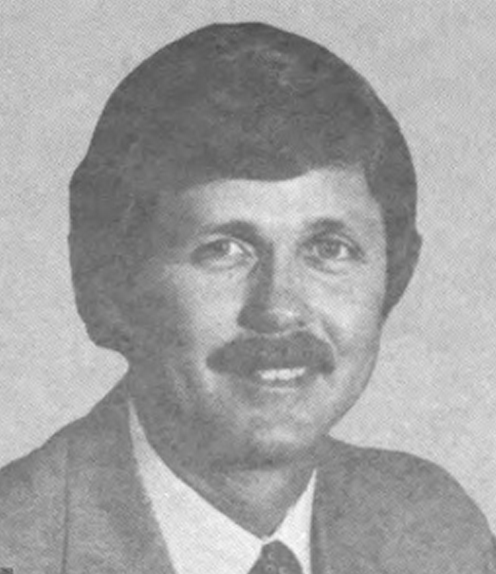

Member of the U.S. House of Representatives from Georgia's 1st district
- In office January 3, 1983 – January 3, 1993
- Preceded by: Ronald B. Ginn
- Succeeded by: Jack Kingston

Personal details
- Born: Robert Lindsay Thomas; November 20, 1943 (age 82) Patterson, Georgia, U.S.
- Party: Democratic
- Education: University of Georgia (BA)

Robert Lindsay Thomas (born November 20, 1943) is an American politician and businessman.

Thomas was born in Patterson, Georgia and graduated from Patterson High School in 1961. He attended Gordon Military Academy in Barnesville for one year and graduated from the University of Georgia in Athens with a Bachelor of Arts degree in 1966. After college, Thomas served in the Georgia Air National Guard from 1966 until 1972 and was in the 165th Tactical Airlift Group. He also worked as an stockbroker and a farmer at Grace Acres Farm, a family owned farm in Screven, Georgia. When his uncle died, Thomas inherited the farm.

The political career of Thomas consisted of five consecutive terms in the U.S. House of Representatives beginning with the 98th Congress and ending in 1992 when he chose not to seek reelection. He was a Democrat representing Georgia's 1st congressional district.

Following his congressional service, Thomas served as the director of state governmental affairs for the Atlanta Committee for the Olympic Games and president and chief executive officer of the Georgia Chamber of Commerce. In 2002, he was appointed Senior Vice President of Governmental Relations for AGL Resources in Atlanta. Thomas maintains residences in Atlanta and Screven, Georgia. As a hobby, he grows red oak and white oak trees from acorns found on the United States Capitol Complex and gives away the saplings as souvenirs.

U.S. House of Representatives
Preceded by Ronald B. Ginn	Member of the U.S. House of Representatives from Georgia's 1st congressional district 1983–1993	Succeeded by Jack Kingston
U.S. order of precedence (ceremonial)
Preceded by W.S. Stuckey Jr. as Former U.S. Representative	Order of precedence of the United States as Former U.S. Representative	Succeeded by John Barrow as Former U.S. Representative
