= Herndon, Georgia =

Unincorporated community in Georgia, U.S.

Coordinates: 32°49′14″N 82°07′45″W

Herndon is an unincorporated community in Jenkins County, in the U.S. state of Georgia.

== History ==
A post office called Herndon was established in 1858, and remained in operation until 1974. The community was named after William Lewis Herndon (1813–1857), United States Navy scientist, explorer, and hero.
