= Butts, Georgia =

Unincorporated community in Georgia, U.S.

Coordinates: 32°43′34″N 82°01′34″W

Butts is an unincorporated community in Jenkins County, Georgia, United States.

== History ==
A post office was established at Butts in 1891, and remained in operation until being discontinued in 1931. Butts was located on the Georgia & Florida Railroad.
