= I Love Us (TV series) =

2022 American reality television series

- Genre: Reality
- Written by: Kimberly Clark; Tyree Elaine; Tyler Fuker; Erin Jackson; Mia Jackson
- Directed by: Elizabeth Zanin
- Presented by: Kym Whitley; Kountry Wayne
- Country of origin: United States
- Original language: English
- No. of seasons: 1
- No. of episodes: 10

Production
- Executive producers: Wanda Sykes; Deb Cullen; Page Hurwitz; Ianthe Jones; Suli McCullough
- Producer: Ayesha Rokadia
- Editor: Joe Gressis
- Production company: Push It Productions

Original release
- Network: BET+
- Release: June 2, 2022

I Love Us is an American reality series that premiered on BET+ on June 2, 2022. The series is hosted by Kym Whitley and Kountry Wayne.

== Episodes ==
No.	Title	Original release date	BET air date	U.S. linear viewers (millions)
1	"That Was a Miracle on MLK Street"	June 2, 2022	March 22, 2023	0.45
2	"You Can't Tell People They Got Roaches"	June 2, 2022	March 29, 2023	0.37
3	"This Is What It Sounds Like When Doves Die"	June 2, 2022	April 5, 2023	0.34
4	"I'm So Tired of You"	June 2, 2022	April 12, 2023	0.32
5	"That's Not Gorilla Glue"	June 2, 2022	April 19, 2023	0.30
6	"Ice Skating, That Ain't For Us"	June 2, 2022	April 26, 2023	0.31
7	"We Gotta Call Her Nana LaBelle"	June 2, 2022	May 3, 2023	0.30
8	"Is This What Country White Folks are Like?"	June 2, 2022	May 10, 2023	0.29
9	"If You Gonna Bust It Wide Open, Do It Like That"	June 2, 2022	May 17, 2023	0.27
10	"That One Made My Wig Twist a Little Bit"	June 2, 2022	May 24, 2023	0.38
