= Prince Preston =

American politician

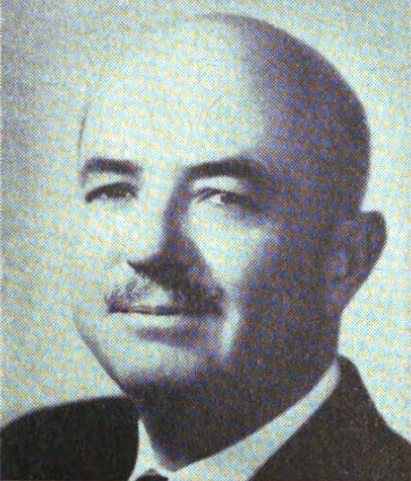

Member of the U.S. House of Representatives from Georgia's 1st district
- In office January 3, 1947 – January 3, 1961
- Preceded by: Hugh Peterson
- Succeeded by: G. Elliott Hagan

Personal details
- Born: July 5, 1908 Monroe, Georgia, US
- Died: February 8, 1961 (aged 52) Savannah, Georgia, US
- Party: Democratic
- Education: University of Georgia School of Law

Prince Hulon Preston Jr. (July 5, 1908 – February 8, 1961) was an American politician, educator and lawyer. A Democrat, he served in the United States House of Representatives for Georgia's 1st congressional district from 1947 to 1961.

== Life ==
Preston was born in Monroe, Georgia. He graduated from the University of Georgia School of Law in Athens and was admitted to the Georgia state bar in 1930. He became a practicing lawyer in Statesboro, Georgia.

After serving in the Georgia House of Representatives from 1935 through 1938, Preston enlisted as a private in the United States Army in 1942 and was promoted through the ranks to captain by the time of his discharge on October 13, 1945. He was then elected as a judge for the Statesboro city courts; however, he also won election to the United States House of Representatives as a Democrat to serve in the 80th United States Congress and never took the bench.

Preston won the primary for the House in 1946 against the six-term incumbent in which Labor was the major issue. Preston lost the popular vote, but Georgia's county unit system was the decider. Preston and Peterson tied with the outcome hinging on Bryan County where Peterson led with three votes. A recount flipped the results with Preston taking the county with six votes and the nomination. He was not challenged again for the nomination until 1956, the instigation then being the discovery of Preston's secret involvement in an FHA housing project in which the Representative had profited. Preston lost the popular vote again but won the county units. The issue arose again in 1958 but Preston won handily. Hagen returned for a third try at the nomination in 1960 with Labor support and reversed the outcomes. Preston won the popular vote and lost the county units. By this time Preston was in poor health. He had suffered a coronary thrombosis in 1957 and a cancer diagnosis in 1958.

Preston was appointed to the Appropriations Committee in only his second term, a major step. In his fifth congress he achieved chairship of the Subcommittee on Department of Commerce and Related Agencies, thus becoming the major organizational actor in funding for that department. Much of his successful public enactments and floor amendments were in this role, but his work also addressed the admissibility of images of records, income tax prosecutions, funding of the United Nations, roads on public lands, and airport funding. While remaining a segregationist and in 1956 signing the "The Southern Manifesto.", Preston in the House avoided grandstanding on the issue.

Preston was reelected for six additional terms before losing his reelection bid in 1960. He died the next year in Savannah, Georgia on February 8, 1961, and was buried in Stateboro's Eastside Cemetery.

U.S. House of Representatives
Preceded by Hugh Peterson	Member of the U.S. House of Representatives from Georgia's 1st congressional district January 3, 1947 – January 3, 1961	Succeeded by G. Elliott Hagan
