= Farmer Brady =

American baseball player (1893–1957)

Farmer Lee Brady
- Pitcher
- Born: August 29, 1893; Jenkins Country, Georgia, US
- Died: July 12, 1957 (aged 63); Cleveland, Ohio, US
- Batted: Unknown Threw: Left

Negro league baseball debut
- 1921, for the Cleveland Tate Stars

Last appearance
- 1924, for the Cleveland Browns
- Stats at Baseball Reference

Teams
- Cleveland Tate Stars (1921); Cleveland Browns (1924)

Farmer "Lefty" Brady (August 29, 1893 – July 12, 1957) was an American professional baseball pitcher in the Negro leagues. He played with the Cleveland Tate Stars in 1921 and the Cleveland Browns in 1924.
