= G. Elliott Hagan =

American politician

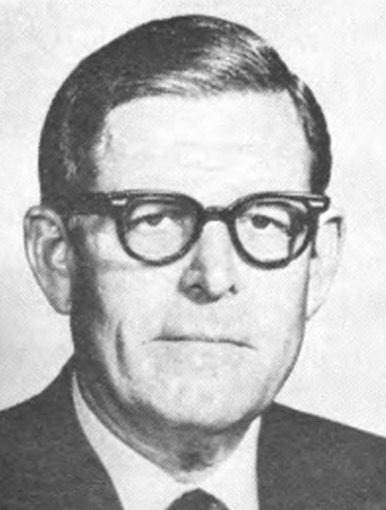

Member of the U.S. House of Representatives from Georgia's 1st district
- In office January 3, 1961 – January 3, 1973
- Preceded by: Prince Hulon Preston Jr.
- Succeeded by: Bo Ginn

Member of the Georgia State Senate from the 17th district
- In office January 8, 1951 – January 12, 1953
- Preceded by: Walter W. Harrison
- Succeeded by: Frank M. Cates

Member of the Georgia House of Representatives from Screven County
- In office 1947–1951
- Preceded by: Philip William Harrison
- Succeeded by: W. Colbert Hawkins
- In office 1939–1944
- Preceded by: George M. Hill Jr.
- Succeeded by: Philip William Harrison

Personal details
- Born: George Elliott Hagan; May 24, 1916 Sylvania, Georgia, U.S.
- Died: December 26, 1990 (aged 74) Sylvania, Georgia, U.S.
- Party: Democratic
- Education: University of Georgia
- Occupation: Politician; businessman; farmer

Military service
- Branch/service: United States Army
- Unit: Signal Corps
- Battles/wars: World War II

George Elliott Hagan (May 24, 1916 – December 26, 1990) was an American politician, businessman and farmer and a Democrat.

== Early years and education ==
Hagan was born in Sylvania, Georgia and attended the University of Georgia in Athens.

== Political career ==
=== Georgia General Assembly ===
He served in the Georgia House of Representatives from 1939 to 1944, resigned from office to join the United States Army as a member of the Signal Corps for two years. Following the war, he was returned to the House in 1946 and served until his election to the Georgia Senate in 1950. Hagan was sworn in as a state senator in January 1951 and served one term, leaving office in 1953.

Between 1953 and 1960, Hagan served in numerous other state government positions and also worked in the insurance and financial planning industry and several agricultural pursuits. He served on the board of trustees for Tift College.

=== United States Congress ===
In 1960, Hagan challenged incumbent Congressman Prince H. Preston, Jr., a noted segregationist in the Democratic primary for Georgia's 1st congressional district. Preston narrowly prevailed in the actual popular vote (34,318 to 33,629), but under Georgia's election laws, Hagan defeated Preston on "county unit" votes by a margin of 26 to 18 and went on to win unopposed in the general election (the Georgia Republican Party being very weak at the time and fielded very few candidates, having not won a race for any congressional race since 1872). Preston would die only a month after the conclusion of his term in early 1973.

Hagan would serve six terms from the 87th United States Congress to the 92nd United States Congress. He ran unopposed in 1962, and faced minor Independent opposition in 1964, winning with 72%. In 1966, he was challenged in the Democratic primary by several opponents and was forced by Savannah State Sen. Frank Downing into a runoff. Hagan held off Downing by a margin of 53-47%. In the general election, he faced his first Republican opponent, Porter Carswell (1904–?) of Burke County, who held Hagan to a 58–42% margin. In 1968, he would face desultory opposition in the primary and defeated Savannah Republican State Senator and former Georgia Republican Party chairman Joseph Tribble by a 68–32% margin. He would dispatch another challenger in the 1970 Democratic primary by 2-to-1 and faced no Republican in the general election.

In 1972, former Hagan staffer and assistant Ronald 'Bo' Ginn would aggressively challenge his former boss in a spirited three-man primary. Holding Hagan to a 43-39% margin in the first round, Ginn would defeat Hagan by a margin of 55–45% in the runoff. Ginn would go on to win the general unopposed.

== Later years ==
Hagan retired from active politics and returned to Sylvania and remained there until his death on December 26, 1990.

== See also ==
U.S. House of Representatives
Preceded by Prince Hulon Preston, Jr.	Member of the U.S. House of Representatives from Georgia's 1st congressional district January 3, 1961 – January 3, 1973	Succeeded by Ronald 'Bo' Ginn
