= Jenkins County, Georgia =

County in Georgia, United States

- County
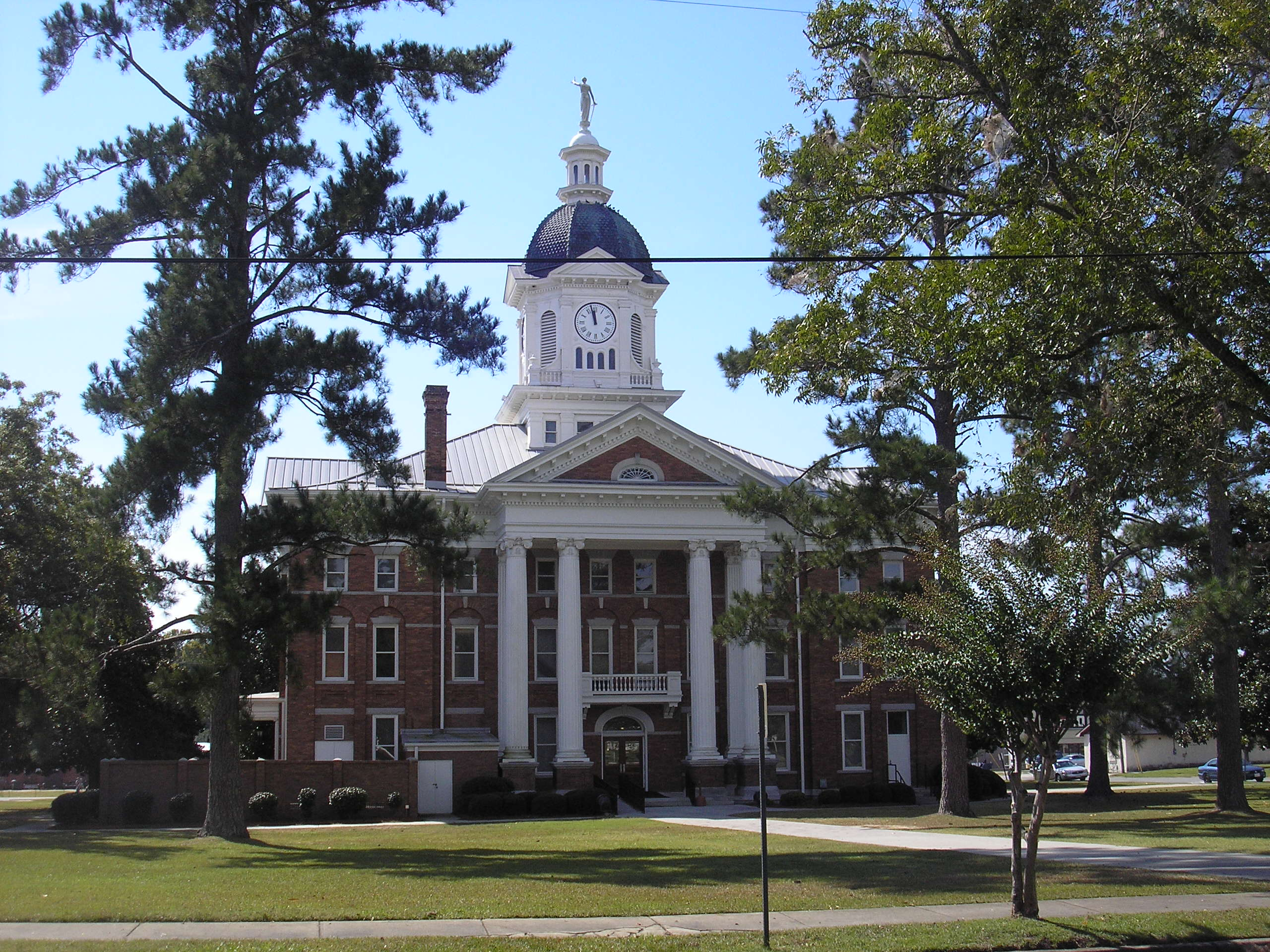
- Jenkins County Courthouse, in Millen

- Location within the U.S. state of Georgia
- Coordinates: 32°47′N 81°58′W
- Country: United States
- State: Georgia
- Founded: August 17, 1905; 121 years ago
- Named for: Charles Jones Jenkins
- Seat: Millen
- Largest city: Millen

Area
  - Total: 352 sq mi (910 km^{2})
  - Land: 347 sq mi (900 km^{2})
  - Water: 5.2 sq mi (13 km^{2}) 1.5%

Population (2020)
  - Total: 8,674
  - Estimate (2025): 8,843 ▲
  - Density: 25/sq mi (9.7/km^{2})
- Time zone: UTC−5 (Eastern)
  - Summer (DST): UTC−4 (EDT)
- Congressional district: 12th
- Website: jenkinscountyga.com

Jenkins County is a county located in the southeastern area of the U.S. state of Georgia. As of the 2020 census, the population was 8,674. The county seat is Millen. Historic Magnolia Springs State Park is located between Millen and Perkins.

== History ==
Jenkins County was created on August 17, 1905, from portions of Bulloch, Burke, Emanuel and Screven counties, and named after the 44th Governor of Georgia, Charles Jones Jenkins. The effort was spearheaded by Robert Gray Daniel (d. May 14, 1934), a director of the local Millen Bank, a 40-year member of the board of education and scion of the county's Daniel family who had large mercantile and farming enterprises.

During the Red Summer of 1919, there was a race riot on April 13, 1919 in Jenkins County, in which white mobs attacked the black community. Prosperous and respected local farmer Joe Ruffin, whose family had historically been slaves working the plantations of the Daniel family, was almost impoverished by the costs of his legal defense and vindication.

For a number of years, the largest employer in the county was Jockey International which employed manual and skilled laborers until reducing then closing operations in September 2007. MI Windows and Doors had a long presence in the county at its manufacturing plant, closing in December 2007.

Jenkins County owns the Millen Airport, which was established to increase local and regional transportation flexibility. Annual assessments show the airport has provided consistent benefit to the people and businesses in the county.

== Geography ==
According to the U.S. Census Bureau, the county has a total area of 352 square miles (910 km^{2}), of which 347 square miles (900 km^{2}) is land and 5.2 square miles (13 km^{2}) (1.5%) is water.

Most of the southern portion of Jenkins County, from southwest of Millen to west of Hiltonia, is located in the Lower Ogeechee River sub-basin of the Ogeechee River basin, with the exception of very small parts of the southwestern corner of the county, north and east of Garfield, which are located in the Canoochee River sub-basin of the same Ogeechee River basin. The northwestern portion of Jenkins County is located in the Upper Ogeechee River sub-basin of the Ogeechee River basin, with just the northeastern corner of the county located in the Brier Creek sub-basin of the Savannah River basin.

=== Major highways ===
- U.S. Route 25
- State Route 17
  - State Route 17 Bypass
- State Route 21
- State Route 23
- State Route 67
- State Route 121
- State Route 555 (Savannah River Parkway)
- State Route 565 (Savannah River Parkway)

=== Adjacent counties ===
- Burke County (north)
- Screven County (east)
- Bulloch County (south)
- Emanuel County (west)

== Communities ==
=== City ===
- Millen

=== Unincorporated Communities ===
- Birdsville
- Butts
- Herndon

=== Census-designated place ===
- Perkins

== Demographics ==
Historical population
Census	Pop.	Note	%±
1910	11,520		—
1920	14,328		24.4%
1930	12,908		−9.9%
1940	11,843		−8.3%
1950	10,264		−13.3%
1960	9,148		−10.9%
1970	8,332		−8.9%
1980	8,841		6.1%
1990	8,247		−6.7%
2000	8,575		4.0%
2010	8,340		−2.7%
2020	8,674		4.0%
2025 (est.)	8,843	▲	1.9%
U.S. Decennial Census; 1790-1880 1890-1910; 1920-1930 1930-1940; 1940-1950 1960-1980; 1980-2000 2010

=== Racial and ethnic composition ===
Jenkins County, Georgia – Racial and ethnic composition Note: the US Census treats Hispanic/Latino as an ethnic category. This table excludes Latinos from the racial categories and assigns them to a separate category. Hispanics/Latinos may be of any race.
Race / Ethnicity (NH = Non-Hispanic)	Pop 1980	Pop 1990	Pop 2000	Pop 2010	Pop 2020	% 1980	% 1990	% 2000	% 2010	% 2020
White alone (NH)	5,154	4,802	4,766	4,508	4,611	58.30%	58.23%	55.58%	54.05%	53.16%
Black or African American alone (NH)	3,543	3,411	3,437	3,353	3,536	40.07%	41.36%	40.08%	40.20%	40.77%
Native American or Alaska Native alone (NH)	1	5	10	22	29	0.01%	0.06%	0.12%	0.26%	0.33%
Asian alone (NH)	6	16	18	36	12	0.07%	0.19%	0.21%	0.43%	0.14%
Native Hawaiian or Pacific Islander alone (NH)	x	x	4	1	5	x	x	0.05%	0.01%	0.06%
Other race alone (NH)	1	0	4	7	30	0.01%	0.00%	0.05%	0.08%	0.35%
Mixed race or Multiracial (NH)	x	x	49	79	148	x	x	0.57%	0.95%	1.71%
Hispanic or Latino (any race)	136	13	287	334	303	1.54%	0.16%	3.35%	4.00%	3.49%
Total	8,841	8,247	8,575	8,340	8,674	100.00%	100.00%	100.00%	100.00%	100.00%

The county reached its peak population in 1920.

=== 2020 census ===
As of the 2020 census, the county had a population of 8,674. The median age was 42.5 years. 19.2% of residents were under the age of 18 and 19.4% of residents were 65 years of age or older. For every 100 females there were 121.4 males, and for every 100 females age 18 and over there were 123.1 males age 18 and over. 0.0% of residents lived in urban areas, while 100.0% lived in rural areas.

The racial makeup of the county was 53.9% White, 40.9% Black or African American, 0.4% American Indian and Alaska Native, 0.1% Asian, 0.1% Native Hawaiian and Pacific Islander, 2.1% from some other race, and 2.4% from two or more races. Hispanic or Latino residents of any race comprised 3.5% of the population.

There were 3,245 households, including 2,095 families, in the county, of which 28.5% had children under the age of 18 living with them and 33.7% had a female householder with no spouse or partner present. About 33.5% of all households were made up of individuals and 17.0% had someone living alone who was 65 years of age or older.

There were 4,066 housing units, of which 20.2% were vacant. Among occupied housing units, 66.4% were owner-occupied and 33.6% were renter-occupied. The homeowner vacancy rate was 2.4% and the rental vacancy rate was 12.2%.

== Politics ==
As of the 2020s, Jenkins County is a strongly Republican voting county, voting 65.03% for Donald Trump in 2024. For elections to the United States House of Representatives, Jenkins County is part of Georgia's 12th congressional district, currently represented by Rick Allen. For elections to the Georgia State Senate, Jenkins County is part of District 23. For elections to the Georgia House of Representatives, Jenkins County is part of District 126.

United States presidential election results for Jenkins County, Georgia
Year	Republican		Democratic		Third party(ies)	
Year	No.	%	No.	%	No.	%
1912	17	5.70%	272	91.28%	9	3.02%
1916	20	4.66%	402	93.71%	7	1.63%
1920	49	12.89%	331	87.11%	0	0.00%
1924	16	6.67%	200	83.33%	24	10.00%
1928	332	44.80%	409	55.20%	0	0.00%
1932	20	3.77%	510	96.23%	0	0.00%
1936	32	3.51%	880	96.49%	0	0.00%
1940	69	6.82%	940	92.98%	2	0.20%
1944	101	12.64%	698	87.36%	0	0.00%
1948	98	10.11%	595	61.40%	276	28.48%
1952	368	23.99%	1,166	76.01%	0	0.00%
1956	261	20.70%	1,000	79.30%	0	0.00%
1960	313	18.78%	1,354	81.22%	0	0.00%
1964	1,509	62.43%	908	37.57%	0	0.00%
1968	574	22.71%	704	27.86%	1,249	49.43%
1972	1,769	78.52%	484	21.48%	0	0.00%
1976	563	23.63%	1,820	76.37%	0	0.00%
1980	824	33.05%	1,632	65.46%	37	1.48%
1984	1,399	55.80%	1,108	44.20%	0	0.00%
1988	1,288	57.30%	953	42.39%	7	0.31%
1992	929	34.05%	1,401	51.36%	398	14.59%
1996	955	38.77%	1,336	54.24%	172	6.98%
2000	1,317	50.79%	1,250	48.21%	26	1.00%
2004	1,898	55.74%	1,494	43.88%	13	0.38%
2008	1,936	56.25%	1,482	43.06%	24	0.70%
2012	1,887	55.60%	1,488	43.84%	19	0.56%
2016	1,895	62.01%	1,123	36.75%	38	1.24%
2020	2,161	62.55%	1,266	36.64%	28	0.81%
2024	2,217	65.03%	1,179	34.58%	13	0.38%

United States Senate election results for Jenkins County, Georgia2
Year	Republican		Democratic		Third party(ies)	
Year	No.	%	No.	%	No.	%
2020	2,155	63.38%	1,194	35.12%	51	1.50%
2020	1,943	62.36%	1,173	37.64%	0	0.00%

United States Senate election results for Jenkins County, Georgia3
Year	Republican		Democratic		Third party(ies)	
Year	No.	%	No.	%	No.	%
2020	1,104	32.80%	806	23.95%	1,456	43.26%
2020	1,945	62.46%	1,169	37.54%	0	0.00%
2022	1,826	66.09%	912	33.01%	25	0.90%
2022	1,647	65.33%	874	34.67%	0	0.00%

Georgia Gubernatorial election results for Jenkins County
Year	Republican		Democratic		Third party(ies)	
Year	No.	%	No.	%	No.	%
2022	1,893	68.24%	871	31.40%	10	0.36%

== Education ==
The Jenkins County School District has three schools, including the Jenkins County High School.

== Notable people ==
- Farmer Brady, baseball player
- Max Burns, politician and academic
- Russell Davis III, football player
- Nathan Deal, politician
- Linda Schrenko, superintendent
- Courtney Smith, football player
- Melvin E. Thompson, educator and politician
- Bennie Ward, physicist
- Kountry Wayne, comedian

== See also ==
- Camp Lawton (Georgia)
- Central Savannah River Area
- National Register of Historic Places listings in Jenkins County, Georgia
- List of counties in Georgia
