= Courtney Smith (defensive back) =

American football player (born 1984)

Profile
- Position: Cornerback

Personal information
- Born: October 17, 1984 (age 42); Stockton, California, U.S.
- Listed height: 5 ft 11 in (1.80 m)
- Listed weight: 195 lb (88 kg)

Career information
- College: Central Washington
- NFL draft: 2010: undrafted

Career history
- Baltimore Ravens (2010)*; San Jose SaberCats (2011); Arizona Rattlers (2011–2012)
- * Offseason or practice squad member only

Career NFL statistics
- Tackles: 0
- Sacks: 0
- Interceptions: 0

Courtney Smith (born October 17, 1984) is an American former professional football player who was a cornerback for the Baltimore Ravens of the National Football League (NFL). He was signed by the Ravens as an undrafted free agent in 2010. He played college football for the Central Washington Wildcats. He was also a member of the San Jose SaberCats and Arizona Rattlers of the Arena Football League.

== College career ==
Smith played college football at Central Washington University in 2008 and 2009. He had played the previous years at Langston University in Oklahoma.

== Professional career ==
=== Baltimore Ravens ===
Smith was not selected in the 2010 NFL draft, but was signed as an undrafted free agent immediately after the draft by the Baltimore Ravens. He was waived on June 17, 2010. On September 23, 2010, the San Jose SaberCats announced the signing of Courtney Smith to their active roster.

=== San Jose SaberCats ===
Smith signed with the San Jose SaberCats of the Arena Football League on September 22, 2010. He was released by the SaberCats on April 6, 2011.

=== Arizona Rattlers ===
Smith was signed by the Arizona Rattlers on July 6, 2011. He was placed on injured reserve on August 5, 2011. He was released by the Rattlers on January 30, 2012.
