= Kountry Wayne =

American comedian, actor and content creator (born 1987)

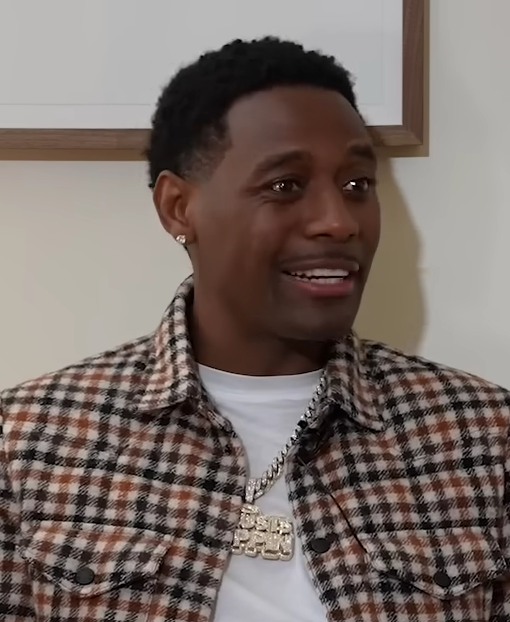
- Wayne in 2026
- Born: Dewayne Jamarr Colley; December 9, 1987 (age 38); Millen, Georgia, U.S.

Comedy career
- Years active: 2014–present
- Medium: Stand-up; film; television
- Website: kountrywayne.com

Kountry Wayne (born DeWayne Jamarr Colley; December 9, 1987) is an American comedian, actor and content creator. Wayne is known for his digital sketches featuring original characters, as well as cameos from actors, musicians, and athletes, including Ludacris, Mike Epps, Lamar Odom, and others.

Wayne released his first book, Help Is On the Way: Stay Up and Live Your Truth, in April 2023. The foreword was written by actor and comedian Cedric the Entertainer.

== Career ==
Wayne made his television debut in September 2018 on MTV's battle rap improv television series Wild 'N Out, created and hosted by Nick Cannon. He starred in the BET original Christmas movie Holiday Heartbreak, released on December 16, 2020. Wayne executive produced and starred in the comedy feature film Strange Love, which premiered on Amazon Prime on February 14, 2022. In April 2023, he portrayed Painted Duck DJ in the Peacock original film Praise This, produced by Will Packer, directed by Tina Gordon, and starring Chloe Bailey, Quavo, Mack Wilds, and Druski.

Wayne co-hosts the reality series I Love Us with Kym Whitley, which premiered on BET+ on June 2, 2022. He released a comedy album, Help Is on the Way, in 2018. In 2021, Wayne was named one of Variety's "10 Comics to Watch." Other comedians on the list that year included Hannah Einbinder, Ayo Edebiri, Quinta Brunson, and Mohammed Amer.

Wayne continues to perform stand-up comedy. In 2023, he headlined his second national theater tour, Help Is on the Way, produced by Live Nation. In 2022, Wayne performed at the Palace Theatre in Los Angeles, California, as part of the Netflix is a Joke Festival. In May 2023, Wayne taped his first one-hour comedy special, A Woman's Prayer, in Washington, D.C., which is set to premiere on Netflix later this year.

== Personal life ==
Wayne is the father of 10 children, 7 of whom he had before the age of 22. He is a vegan and does not smoke or drink alcohol. Wayne has been romantically linked to comedian Jess Hilarious. He owns a fuchsia Rolls-Royce Black Badge Cullinan and is a fan of the Dallas Cowboys. Wayne grew up in Millen, Georgia.

== Influences ==
Wayne cites Redd Foxx and Richard Pryor as his comedic influences.
