= Courtne Smith =

Canadian-American entrepreneur

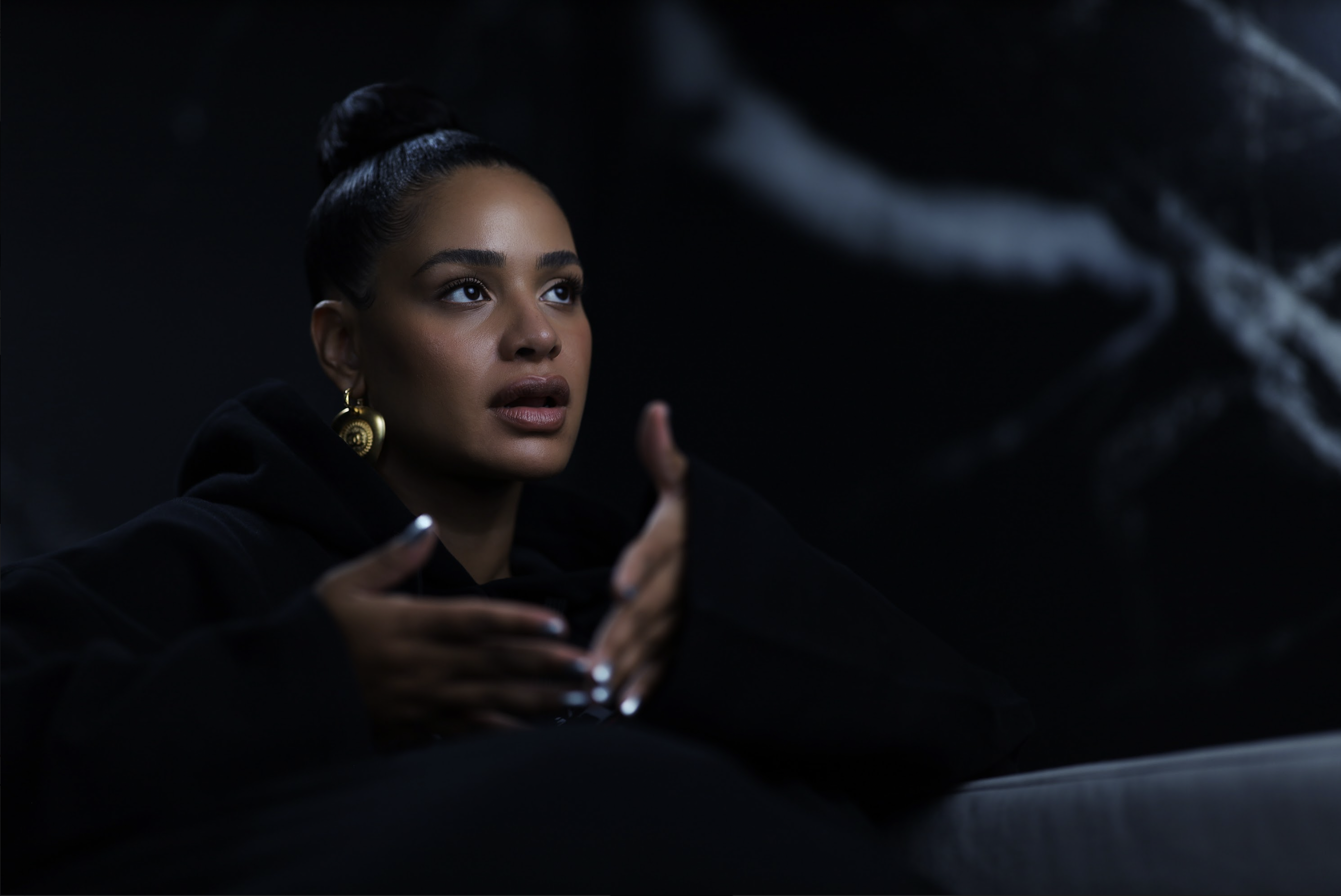

Courtne Smith (born April 29, 1988) is a Canadian-American entrepreneur.

== Early life and education ==
Courtne Smith was born in Toronto, Ontario and is a dual citizen of Canada and the United States. Smith attended the University of Western Ontario where she studied business.

Her father, Bruce Smith, was an African-American athlete and entrepreneur who grew up in Huntsville, Texas. He became a professional football player in 1972, winning the Canadian Grey Cup Championship. He played for the Toronto Argonauts from 1976 to 1979 as defensive captain DT. Smith led a successful career in real estate becoming one of Canada’s top-selling agents and later established his own firm. He became an ordained chaplain and pastor in 1999. He died of pancreatic cancer in 2013 at the age of 63.

== Career ==
Smith began her career as a personal assistant to Grammy Award-winning musician Drake (Aubrey Drake Graham). She worked in Drake’s management team for over a decade handling his business endeavors and special projects. Smith and Drake grew up together in Toronto, Ontario and were best friends since they were kids. She dropped out of college when Drake offered her a job and is the only female in Drake’s inner circle.

In 2015, Smith co-founded Tharen, a hair extension brand with Filip Diarra. Tharen was worn by Serena Williams and Taraji P. Henson. In 2015, Shopify chose Tharen as an honorable business for the 2015 Shopify Ecommerce Design Awards. Tharen was acquired in 2019.

In 2018, Smith co-founded Suprize, a contest giveaway app with Filip Diarra. Suprize combined pop culture, fashion, entertainment and gaming for users looking to win free prizes. Suprize was favored by celebrities like Post Malone and Shawn Mendes.

In 2020, Smith and Diarra launched NewNew, a polling and decision-making platform. She is the CEO of NewNew and one of fewer than 20 Black female founders in tech history to build an eight-figure, venture-backed company. NewNew is funded by investors including Andreessen Horowitz, Founders Fund, Canaan Partners and Shrug Capital. Snap Inc. selected NewNew as one of nine companies for Snapchat’s inaugural Yellow Collabs program.
