= Bennie Ward =

B. F. L. Ward
- Born: October 19, 1948 (age 77); Millen, Georgia, U.S.
- Education: Massachusetts Institute of Technology (BS); Princeton University (MA, PhD)
- Scientific career
- Fields: Physics
- Workplaces: SLAC; Purdue University; University of Tennessee; Baylor University
- Doctoral advisor: Sam Treiman

Bennie Franklin Leon Ward (born October 19, 1948) is a theoretical particle physicist at Baylor University in Texas. He is a Fellow of the American Physical Society and is currently co-editor-in-chief of The Open Nuclear and Particle Physics Journal.

== Background ==
He was born in Millen, Georgia. He finished high school at the Academy of Richmond County, Augusta, Georgia, in 1966.

He received B.S. degrees in mathematics and physics in June 1970, from MIT, an M.A. degree in physics from Princeton, in October 1971, and his Ph.D. degree in physics from Princeton in January 1973, under the direction of Professor S. B. Treiman. He held a postdoctoral appointment at SLAC from 1973 to 1975, was an assistant professor of physics at Purdue from 1975 to 1978. From 1979 to 1985, he had the special opportunity to perform several applications of theoretical particle physics methods to problems of urgent interest in the Silicon Valley high-tech industries. In 1986, he was appointed an associate professor of physics at University of Tennessee, Knoxville. In 1990, he was promoted to full professor. From 2001 to 2002, he was a visiting professor at MPI, Munich. In 2003, he was appointed chair and distinguished professor of physics at Baylor University, where he currently remains as distinguished professor of physics.

== Research ==
He is primarily focused on the theory of precision applications of quantum field theory methods to high energy physics, with recent emphasis on LHC physics scenarios and applications of his new resumed quantum gravity theory. Ward has written over 250 articles. Two of his papers have been cited more than 250 times and also 9 and 20 with more than 100 and 50 citations respectively.
