= Downtown Millen Historic District =

Historic district in Georgia, United States

- U.S. National Register of Historic Places
- U.S. Historic district
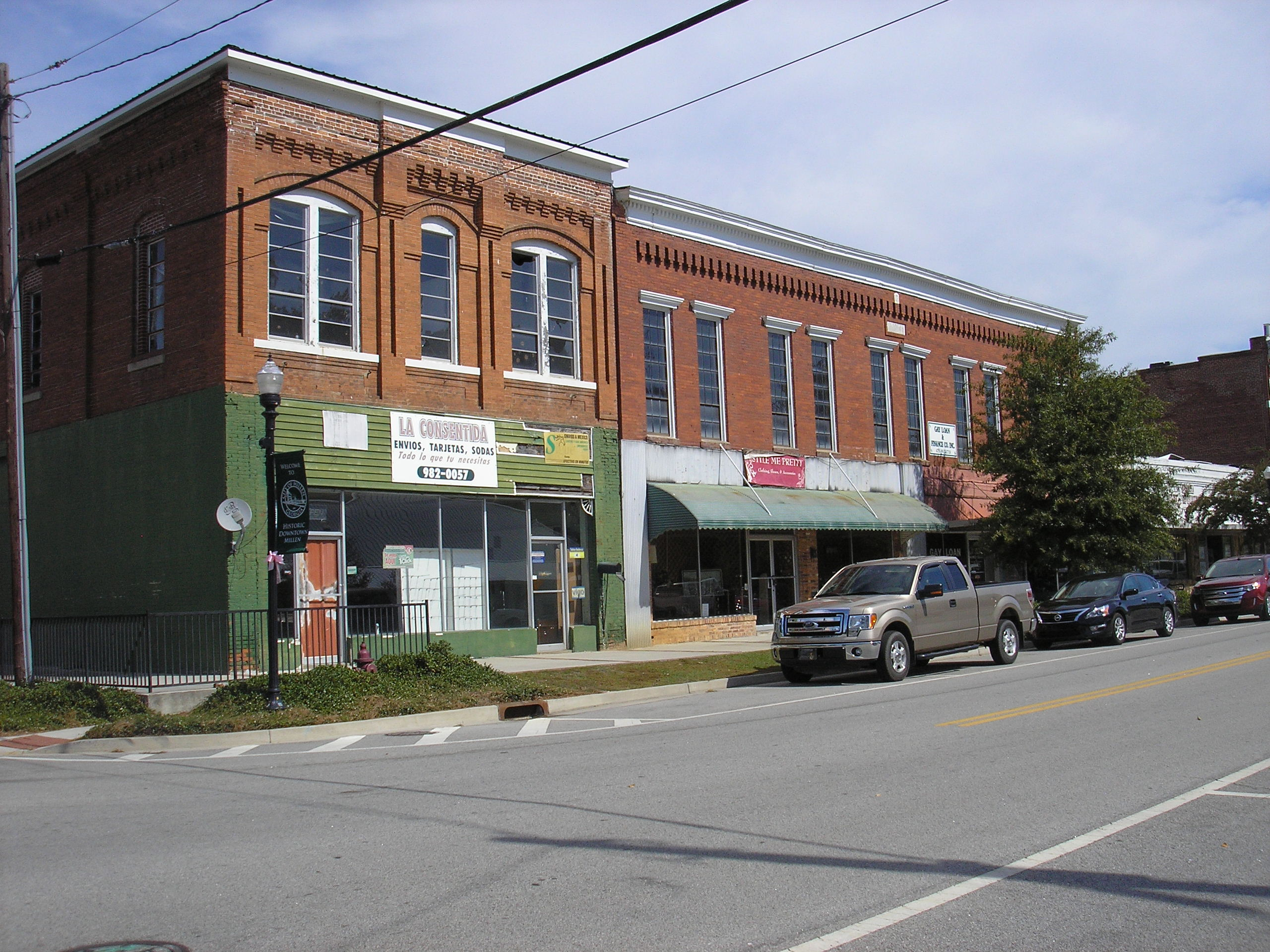
- Location: Along Cotton Ave. roughly bounded by N. Hendrix St., E. Winthrope Ave., N. Masonic St., and the RR line, Millen, Georgia
- Coordinates: 32.802222°N 81.94°W
- Area: 47 acres (19 ha)
- NRHP reference No.: 96001340
- Added to NRHP: November 15, 1996

The Downtown Millen Historic District is a 47 acres (19 ha) historic district in Millen, Georgia, United States, which was listed on the National Register of Historic Places in 1996. It then included 44 contributing buildings, four contributing structures, and two contributing objects.

It also included 15 non-contributing buildings.

Notable properties in the district include:

Landmark name	Image	Date Built	Style	Location	Description
Millen City Hall		1936			(see accompanying photo #3)
Former passenger depot		c.1910			Now freight depot (photo #6)
Former freight depot (1900)		1900			By 1996 this was Millen Chamber of Commerce/museum (photo #10)
Daniel Building		late 1800s		corner of Cotton Avenue and North Gray Street	Has "stencil-cut pressed tin cornice, granite window sills, and segmenta1 brick arches over second-floor windows" (photos #5,7)
Godbee building		1905			Two-story brick building built by John Edenfield (photo #5)
Kenwin Building		1893			(photo #8)
former Bank of Millen (1954)		1954			(photo #8)
former First National Bank (c. 1900)		c.1900			a two-story building (photo #15)
U.S. Post Office		1938	Colonial Revival	corner of East Winthrope Avenue and North Daniel Street	Has "front entrance with engaged pilasters and fanlight, marble trim, cornice, steps, and platform and a flat composition roof enclosed by parapet wall." Approved cost of $65,000 was allowed for the site, building, and administration, under the Emergency Construction Program Act.
