= Birdsville, Georgia =

Unincorporated community in Georgia, U.S.

Coordinates: 32°52′18″N 82°04′40″W

Birdsville is an unincorporated community in Jenkins County, in the U.S. state of Georgia. Birdsville Plantation, an estate listed on the National Register of Historic Places, is located in the community.

== History ==
A post office called Birdsville first opened in 1813, when the town site was within the borders of Burke County. Captain Samuel Bird, an early postmaster, gave the community his last name. A variant name is "Birdville".
