= Jenkins County High School =

High school in Millen, Georgia, United States

Location
- 433 Barney Avenue; Millen, Jenkins County, Georgia 30442; United States; 32°48′35″N 81°56′31″W

Information
- School type: Secondary
- School district: Jenkins County School District
- Principal: Rob Gray
- Staff: 30.70 (FTE)
- Enrollment: 328 (2023-2024)
- Student to teacher ratio: 10.68
- Colors: Navy and White
- Mascot: War Eagle
- Information: 478-982-4791
- Website: Jenkins County High School

Jenkins County High School is located in Jenkins County in the city of Millen, Georgia, United States. Their mascot is the War Eagle.

Jenkins County's track team won the state championship in 2003 and were state runners-up in 2004. The Jenkins County JROTC Raiders and Regulation Drill Team were 2008 and 2009 Overall State Champions. The Raider team was first runner-up at the national level competition, held in Molena, Georgia, in 2009. The Jenkins County boys' cross country team were the 2012 and 2013 GHSA Class A Public State Runners-Up and the 2014 GHSA Class A Public State Champions. The Jenkins County girls' cross country team were the 2014 GHSA Class A Public second runner-up (third place).

Two students earned a perfect score on the math portion of the GHSGT (Georgia High School Graduation Test).
