= Camp Lawton (Georgia) =

Confederate POW camp

- U.S. National Register of Historic Places
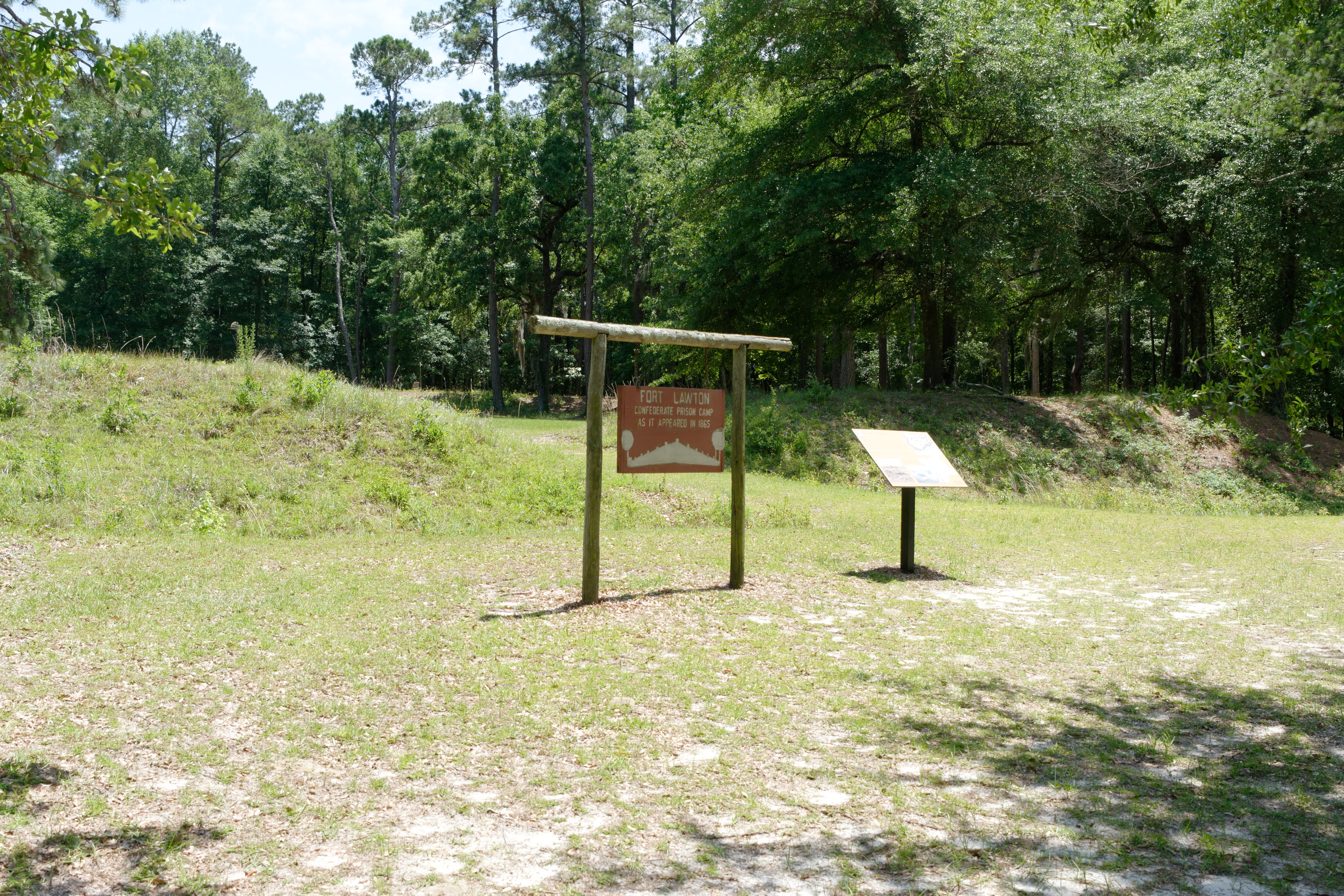
- Earthenworks

- Location within Georgia Location within the United States
- Nearest city: Millen, Georgia
- Coordinates: 32°53′12″N 81°57′20″W
- Area: 101 acres (41 ha)
- Built: 1864
- Architects: Brig. Gen. John H. Winder, C.S.A.
- NRHP reference No.: 78000992
- Added to NRHP: March 24, 1978

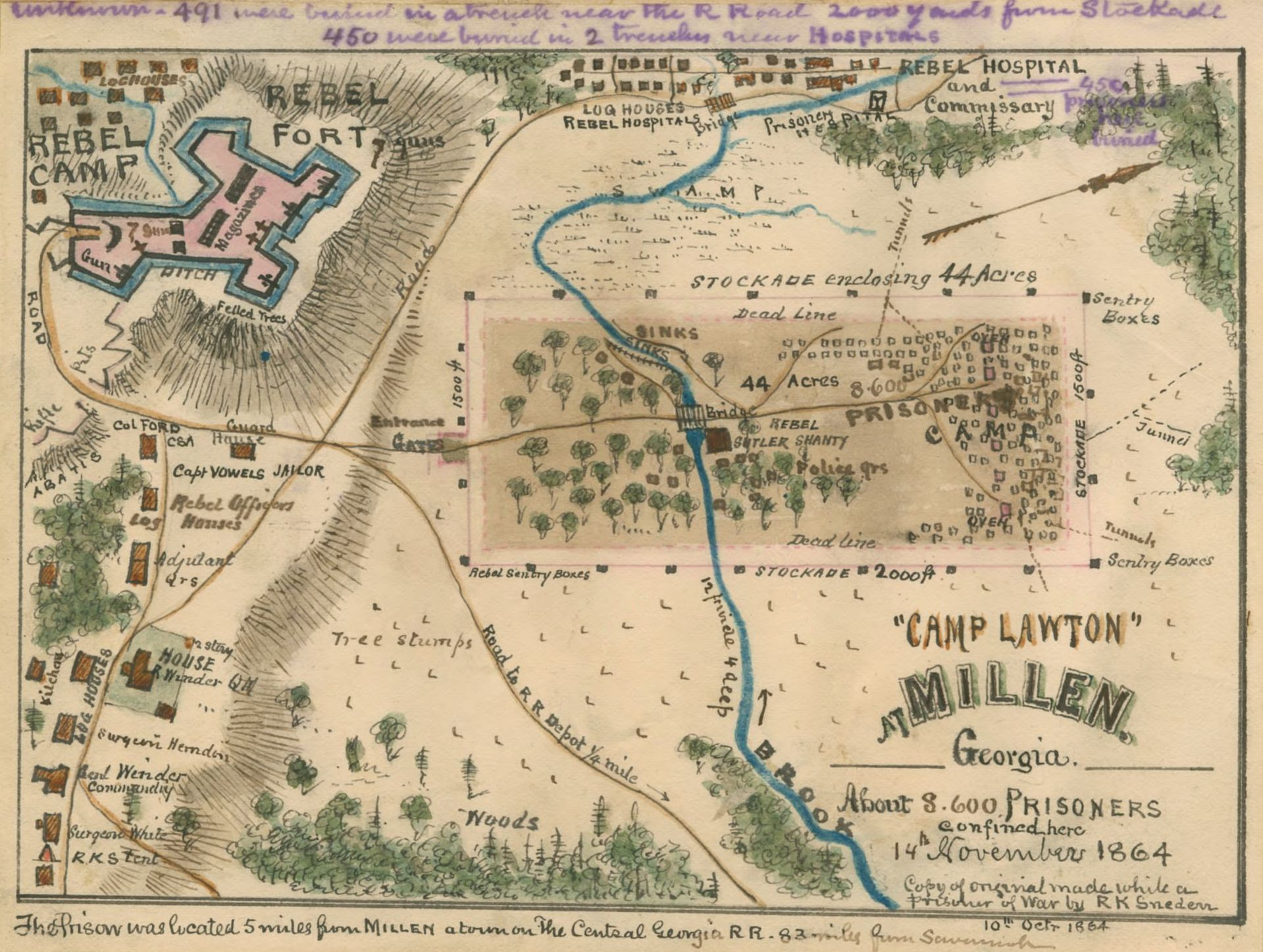
Map of Camp Lawton on November 14, 1864

Camp Lawton or the Millen Prison was a stockade which held Union soldiers who been taken as prisoners-of-war during the American Civil War. Located beside the Augusta and Savannah Railroad right-of-way five miles north of what was then Millen Junction (now Millen) in Burke County (since 1905 in Jenkins County), the new prison facility was modeled after Camp Sumter. It opened in October 1864 but had to be evacuated within six weeks, due to the advance of Sherman's army through Georgia. With an area of 42 acres (17 ha) and holding over 10,000 of a planned 40,000 men, it was said to be the largest prison in the world at that time.

The area of Magnolia Springs State Park that now comprises the day-use area was used as the prison. The park still houses remnants of the earthen fort that guarded the 10,000-prisoner camp. Two huge timbers, possibly from the prison but more likely from work done by the Civilian Conservation Corps between 1938 and 1942, were recovered. The park's new History Center currently displays some of the first artifacts excavated by the archaeology team from Georgia Southern University. Georgia Southern's Sociology/Anthropology Department has been conducting surveys and excavations for a number of years at the park, serving as a partner in revealing and interpreting the history of Camp Lawton.

== History ==
Camp Lawton was established during the Civil War in the fall of 1864 by the Confederate Army to house Union prisoners of war. The Magnolia Springs site was selected to take advantage of the abundant water supply. Built by slave labor and a group of Union prisoners of pine timber harvested on site, the walls measured 12 to 15 feet (3.7 to 4.6 m) high. The stockade began receiving the first of at least 10,299 prisoners in early October. The post was abandoned by the end of November when threatened by Sherman's drive on Savannah.

Colonel Adin B. Underwood wrote that they found, on December 5, 1864, a "village of graves, 900 of them." (Atlanta Post-Appeal, The Three Year's Service of the Thirty-third Mass. Infantry Regiment, November 23, 1881, p. 239.) Chaplain Thomas M. Stevenson wrote, "God will certainly visit the authors' of this crime with his terrible lightning." (History of the Seventy-eighth Regiment O.V.V.I., Zanesville, Hugh Dunne, 1865, pp. 316–317.)

Research using ground-penetrating radar (GPR) conducted in December 2009 by the Lamar Institute of Technology revealed a possible location for the southwest corner of the prison stockade. In 2010 Georgia Southern University undertook archaeological investigations to "ground truth" the results of the GPR survey. In August of that year several Georgia Southern archaeology students uncovered the stockade and around 200 Civil War artifacts. The students had used watercolors by an imprisoned private to locate the site. A fence has been erected to keep people away from the archeological dig near the park's aquarium.

== See also ==
- Magnolia Springs State Park
