= Courtney Smith (linebacker) =

American gridiron football player (born 1984)

No. 1
- Position: Linebacker

Personal information
- Born: October 26, 1984 (age 42); Millen, Georgia, U.S.
- Listed height: 5 ft 11 in (1.80 m)
- Listed weight: 221 lb (100 kg)

Career information
- College: Texas State–San Marcos
- NFL draft: 2009: undrafted

Career history
- 2009: BC Lions
- 2010: Winnipeg Blue Bombers
- Stats at CFL.ca

Courtney Smith (born October 26, 1984) is an American former professional football linebacker for the BC Lions and Winnipeg Blue Bombers of the Canadian Football League (CFL). He was originally signed by the BC Lions as a free agent in 2009. He played college football at Texas State–San Marcos.
