= Perkins, Georgia =

- Unincorporated community Census-designated place
- Location within Georgia Location within the United States
- Coordinates: 32°54′35″N 81°57′10″W
- Country: United States
- State: Georgia
- County: Jenkins

Area
  - Total: 2.12 sq mi (5.49 km^{2})
  - Land: 2.07 sq mi (5.36 km^{2})
  - Water: 0.050 sq mi (0.13 km^{2})
- Elevation: 262 ft (80 m)

Population (2020)
  - Total: 93
  - Density: 44.9/sq mi (17.35/km^{2})
- Time zone: UTC-5 (Eastern (EST))
  - Summer (DST): UTC-4 (EDT)
- ZIP code: 30822
- FIPS code: 13-60312
- GNIS feature ID: 2587044

Perkins (also Perkins Station) is a census-designated place and unincorporated community in Jenkins County, Georgia, United States. As of the 2020 census, Perkins had a population of 93.

It lies a short distance east of U.S. Route 25, 7 miles (11 km) north of the city of Millen, the county seat of Jenkins County. Its elevation is 239 feet (73 m).

== Demographics ==
Historical population
Census	Pop.	Note	%±
2010	91		—
2020	93		2.2%
1980-2000; 2010 2020

Perkins was first listed as a census designated place in the 2010 U.S. census.

Perkins, Georgia – Racial and ethnic composition Note: the US Census treats Hispanic/Latino as an ethnic category. This table excludes Latinos from the racial categories and assigns them to a separate category. Hispanics/Latinos may be of any race.
Race / Ethnicity (NH = Non-Hispanic)	Pop 2010	Pop 2020	% 2010	% 2020
White alone (NH)	87	84	95.60%	90.32%
Black or African American alone (NH)	3	4	3.30%	4.30%
Native American or Alaska Native alone (NH)	0	0	0.00%	0.00%
Asian alone (NH)	0	0	0.00%	0.00%
Pacific Islander alone (NH)	0	0	0.00%	0.00%
Other race alone (NH)	0	0	0.00%	0.00%
Mixed race or Multiracial (NH)	1	0	1.10%	0.00%
Hispanic or Latino (any race)	0	5	0.00%	5.38%
Total	91	93	100.00%	100.00%

== See also ==
- List of census-designated places in Georgia (U.S. state)
- Central Savannah River Area
