= Millen, Georgia =

- City
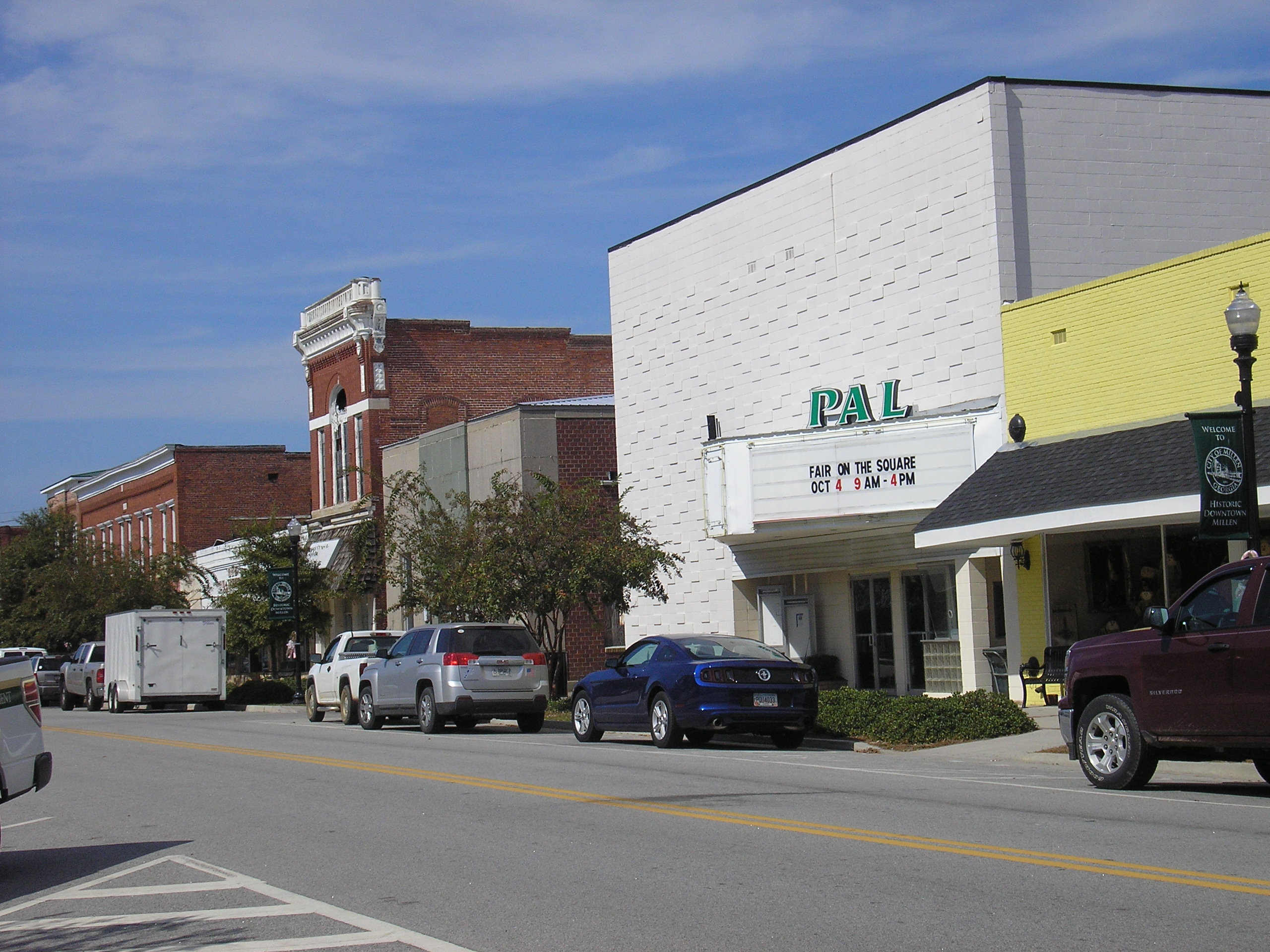
- Downtown Millen, 2014

- Location in Jenkins County and the state of Georgia
- Coordinates: 32°48′N 81°57′W
- Country: United States
- State: Georgia
- County: Jenkins (since 1905)
- Settled: 1835
- Incorporated: 1881
- Named for: McPherson B. Millen

Area
  - Total: 3.60 sq mi (9.33 km^{2})
  - Land: 3.58 sq mi (9.27 km^{2})
  - Water: 0.023 sq mi (0.06 km^{2})
- Elevation: 167 ft (51 m)

Population (2020)
  - Total: 2,966
  - Density: 828.7/sq mi (319.97/km^{2})
- Time zone: UTC-5 (Eastern (EST))
  - Summer (DST): UTC-4 (EDT)
- ZIP code: 30442
- Area code: 478
- FIPS code: 13-51520
- GNIS feature ID: 0356393

Millen is a city, and the county seat of Jenkins County, Georgia, United States. As of the 2020 census, Millen had a population of 2,966.

The city is intersected by U.S. Route 25 and State Route 17.

== History ==
Millen was first settled in 1835 along the border of what was then Burke and Screven counties. It was originally named "79" due to its approximate distance in miles from the coastal city of Savannah. Planters cultivated cotton as a commodity crop.

In 1854, the Central of Georgia Railway and the Georgia Railroad connected at 79. The town became known as "Millen's Junction" after McPherson B. Millen, the superintendent of the Central of Georgia Railway.

During the Civil War, a site for a prisoner-of-war camp to house Union soldiers was chosen about five miles from Millen's Junction. Camp Lawton included a hospital, fort and officer housing and had about 8,600 prisoners confined there on 14 November 1864, according to a detailed camp map made by a former prisoner. It was built in what is today Magnolia Springs State Park, because the location was favorable due to the springs providing potable water and its proximity to the Augusta and Savannah Railroad. On December 3, 1864, Sherman's March to the Sea passed through Millen. Prior to the arrival of Union forces, Confederate soldiers evacuated the Camp Lawton prisoners to Savannah. The Union soldiers destroyed Millen's Junction after finding the prison camp and to avoid use of the railway junction.

The town was rebuilt after the war. In 1881, the city of Millen was incorporated by an act of the Georgia State Legislature, becoming the county seat of the newly created Jenkins County in 1905. The summer of 1919 was called the Red Summer due to a number of race riots throughout America. Millen did not escape this and white mobs burned down and killed a number of people in Millen during the Jenkins County, Georgia, riot of 1919.

The Downtown Millen Historic District was listed on the National Register of Historic Places in 1996. The county is largely rural and agricultural.

== Geography ==
Millen is the only incorporated municipality in Jenkins County. It is located on the east side of the Ogeechee River. U.S. Route 25 passes through the west side of the city, leading north 20 miles (32 km) to Waynesboro and south 29 miles (47 km) to Statesboro. Georgia State Route 17 passes through the center of the city, entering from the west as Winthrope Avenue and leaving to the south as Masonic Street. SR-17 leads northwest 35 miles (56 km) to Louisville and southeast 77 miles (124 km) to Savannah. State Route 21 bypasses Millen to the northeast, ending at US 25 at the northern city limit. SR-21 leads east 20 miles (32 km) to Sylvania.

According to the United States Census Bureau, Millen has a total area of 3.6 square miles (9.3 km^{2}), of which 0.02 square miles (0.06 km^{2}), or 0.67%, are water.

== Demographics ==
Historical population
| Census | Pop. | Note | %± |
|---|---|---|---|
| 1900 | 411 | | — |
| 1910 | 2,030 | | 393.9% |
| 1920 | 2,405 | | 18.5% |
| 1930 | 2,527 | | 5.1% |
| 1940 | 2,820 | | 11.6% |
| 1950 | 3,449 | | 22.3% |
| 1960 | 3,633 | | 5.3% |
| 1970 | 3,713 | | 2.2% |
| 1980 | 3,988 | | 7.4% |
| 1990 | 3,808 | | −4.5% |
| 2000 | 3,492 | | −8.3% |
| 2010 | 3,120 | | −10.7% |
| 2020 | 2,966 | | −4.9% |
U.S. Decennial Census; 1850-1870 1870-1880; 1890-1910 1920-1930; 1940 1950 1960; 1970 1980 1990; 2000 2010

=== 2020 census ===
As of the 2020 census, there were 2,966 people, 1,113 households, and 563 families residing in the city. The median age was 41.9 years. 23.7% of residents were under the age of 18 and 22.4% of residents were 65 years of age or older. For every 100 females there were 87.5 males, and for every 100 females age 18 and over there were 81.7 males age 18 and over.

0.0% of residents lived in urban areas, while 100.0% lived in rural areas.

Of the city's households, 30.2% had children under the age of 18 living in them. Of all households, 25.9% were married-couple households, 24.2% were households with a male householder and no spouse or partner present, and 44.4% were households with a female householder and no spouse or partner present. About 38.3% of all households were made up of individuals and 19.1% had someone living alone who was 65 years of age or older.

There were 1,531 housing units, of which 17.4% were vacant. The homeowner vacancy rate was 2.3% and the rental vacancy rate was 10.4%.

Millen racial composition as of 2020
| Race | Num. | Perc. |
|---|---|---|
| White (non-Hispanic) | 999 | 33.68% |
| Black or African American (non-Hispanic) | 1,773 | 59.78% |
| Native American | 7 | 0.24% |
| Asian | 8 | 0.27% |
| Pacific Islander | 3 | 0.1% |
| Other/Mixed | 73 | 2.46% |
| Hispanic or Latino | 103 | 3.47% |

== Education ==
=== Jenkins County School District ===
The Jenkins County School District holds pre-school to grade twelve, and consists of one elementary school, one middle school, and one high school. The district has 119 full-time teachers and over 1,754 students.

- Jenkins County Elementary School
- Jenkins County Middle School
- Jenkins County High School

== Notable people ==
- Jim Busby, Major League Baseball player who retired to Millen after his coaching career was over.
- Max Burns, politician and academic
- Russell Davis III, football player
- Nathan Deal, 82nd governor of Georgia, born in Millen
- Linda Schrenko, superintendent
- Courtney Smith, football player
- Melvin E. Thompson, 70th governor of Georgia, born in Millen
- Bennie Ward, physicist
- Kountry Wayne, comedian, TV & film actor, social media influencer, and content creator born and raised in Millen.

== See also ==
- Camp Lawton (Georgia)
- National Register of Historic Places listings in Jenkins County, Georgia
